= Contraception, Sterilisation, and Abortion (Safe Areas) Amendment Act 2022 =

Act of Parliament in New Zealand

Contraception, Sterilisation, and Abortion (Safe Areas) Act 2022

New Zealand Parliament
- Royal assent: 18 March 2022
- Commenced: 18 March 2022

Legislative history
- Introduced by: Louisa Wall
- First reading: 10 March 2021
- Second reading: 15 February 2022
- Third reading: 16 March 2022
- Passed: 16 March 2022

Related legislation
- Abortion Legislation Act 2020; Contraception, Sterilisation, and Abortion Act 1977
- Status: Current legislation

The Contraception, Sterilisation, and Abortion (Safe Areas) Amendment Act 2022 is an Act of Parliament in New Zealand that provides a regulation-making power to set up safe areas around specific abortion facilities on a case-by-case basis. The Bill passed its third reading on 16 March 2022 and received royal assent on 18 March.

== Legislative features ==
The Contraception, Sterilisation, and Abortion (Safe Areas) Amendment Bill is a member's bill introduced by Labour Party MP Louisa Wall to establish safe zones around abortion clinics and hospitals to protect the safety and privacy of women seeking abortion services in New Zealand. The Bill seeks to provide a regulation-making power to set up safe areas around specific abortion facilities, on a case-by-case basis; and to define behaviours that are prohibited within these safe areas. It amends the Contraception, Sterilisation, and Abortion Act 1977 by inserting section 13A to 13C:

Section 13A prohibits certain behaviours in safe areas including:

- Obstructing a person in a safe area who is approaching, entering, or leaving any building providing abortion services;
- Making a visual recording of another person (Person A) in a safe area in a manner that is likely to cause emotional distress to a person accessing, providing, or assisting with providing abortion services;
- Interfering with another person who may be accessing, providing, or assisting with providing, abortion services in the following ways:
  - Advising or persuading another person from accessing or providing abortion services. However, the law provides immunity on the grounds that the advice or persuasion is from an individual who is, with the consent of Person A, accompanying Person A.
  - Informing Person A about matters related to the provision of abortion services, other than during the course of providing those services, or assisting with provision of those services. However, the law provides for immunity on the grounds that the information is provided by an individual who is, with the consent of Person A, accompanying Person A.
  - Engaging in protest about matters relating to the provision of abortion services.

Any person who engages in the prohibited behaviour is liable for a fine not exceeding $1,000.

Section 13B gives police constables the explicit power to arrest those engaging in prohibited behaviours without a warrant.

Section 13C defines "safe areas" as any specified premises at which abortion services are provided; and areas within the vicinity of 150 metres (490 ft) from any part of those premises.

== Legislative history ==
=== Background ===
During a parliamentary committee considering the Abortion Legislation Act 2020 on 10 March 2020, ACT Party leader David Seymour had successfully moved an amendment deleting the definition of "safe zones" from the legislation while voting for the proposal to remove the regulatory power to create safe areas. Seymour's amendment was controversial since it had been adopted during a "voting mix-up." The Abortion Legislation Act subsequently passed into law with Seymour's amendment on 18 March, and received royal assent that same month.

In response to the scrapping of the safe area provisions, Labour MP Louisa Wall entered the Contraception, Sterilisation, and Abortion (Safe Areas) Amendment Bill, proposing their restoration, into the member's bill ballot. The bill was drawn from the ballot on 28 July 2020. Wall's bill was drafted in line with the recommendations that were made by the Abortion Legislation Committee when it considered the safe area provisions in the Abortion Legislation Act.

In February 2021, the Attorney-General David Parker released his report on the Contraception, Sterilisation, and Abortion (Safe Areas) Amendment Bill under the New Zealand Bill of Rights Act 1990. While the Attorney-General agreed with the previous vetting advice provided by the Abortion Legislation Committee on safe areas, he expressed concerns that Clause Five providing for safe areas around abortion providers and designating "prohibited behaviour" was inconsistent with the Bill of Rights Act since it criminalised "communicating in a manner that is objectively emotionally distressing." He proposed replacing the offending text with an extended definition of "intimidation" to include communicative acts carried out by anti-abortion activists such as sign-waving, "sidewalk counselling" and video recording.

=== First Reading ===
The CSA (Safe Areas) Amendment Bill passed its first reading on 10 March 2021 by a margin of 100 to 15 votes. The Bill was supported by its initiator Louisa Wall, the opposition National Party's spokesperson for women Nicola Grigg, Attorney-General David Parker, Green MP Jan Logie, National MP Barbara Kuriger, and Labour MP Sarah Pallett, who delivered speeches defending women's access to abortion and criticising the conduct of some anti-abortion activists. ACT Party leader David Seymour voted in favour of the bill, stating his party's support for a ban on the intimidation and obstruction of abortion patients but criticised the communication ban as an erosion of free speech. National MP Michael Woodhouse expressed concerns about free speech but supported the passage on the bill on the grounds that the public's voice needed to be heard at the select committee stage.

By contrast, Labour MP Anahila Kanongata'a-Suisuiki and National MP Chris Penk voted against the bill, describing it as an erosion of free speech and expressing concerns about the broad interpretation of "communication." National MP Christopher Luxon also voted against the bill but did not speak during the first reading.

Voting at first reading (10 March 2021)
Party	Voted for	Voted against	Abstained	Absent
Labour (65)	61: Kiri Allan; Ginny Andersen; Jacinda Ardern; Camilla Belich; Glen Bennett; Rachel Boyack; Rachel Brooking; Naisi Chen; David Clark; Tāmati Coffey; Liz Craig; Kelvin Davis; Paul Eagle; Barbara Edmonds; Kris Faafoi; Shanan Halbert; Peeni Henare; Emily Henderson; Chris Hipkins; Willie Jackson; Ingrid Leary; Neru Leavasa; Steph Lewis; Andrew Little; Anna Lorck; Marja Lubeck; Jo Luxton; Nanaia Mahuta; Trevor Mallard; Kieran McAnulty; Tracey McLellan; Stuart Nash; Terisa Ngobi; Damien O'Connor; Greg O'Connor; Ibrahim Omer; Sarah Pallett; David Parker; Willow-Jean Prime; Priyanca Radhakrishnan; Angela Roberts; Grant Robertson; Adrian Rurawhe; Deborah Russell; Jenny Salesa; Carmel Sepuloni; Gaurav Sharma; William Sio; Jan Tinetti; Phil Twyford; Tangi Utikere; Ayesha Verrall; Louisa Wall; Vanushi Walters; Angie Warren-Clark; Duncan Webb; Meka Whaitiri; Helen White; Arena Williams; Poto Williams; Megan Woods	3: Anahila Kanongata'a-Suisuiki; Jamie Strange; Rino Tirikatene	–	1: Michael Wood
National (33)	19: Andrew Bayly; Chris Bishop; Simon Bridges; Gerry Brownlee; Judith Collins; Matt Doocey; Paul Goldsmith; Nicola Grigg; Barbara Kuriger; Todd McClay; Ian McKelvie; Mark Mitchell; Todd Muller; Shane Reti; Stuart Smith; Erica Stanford; Simon Watts; Nicola Willis; Michael Woodhouse	12: David Bennett; Simeon Brown; Jacqui Dean; Christopher Luxon; Joseph Mooney; Simon O'Connor; Chris Penk; Penny Simmonds; Scott Simpson; Nick Smith; Louise Upston; Tim van de Molen	2: Melissa Lee; Maureen Pugh	–
Green (10)	10: Marama Davidson; Julie Anne Genter; Golriz Ghahraman; Elizabeth Kerekere; Jan Logie; Ricardo Menéndez March; Eugenie Sage; James Shaw; Chlöe Swarbrick; Teanau Tuiono	–	–	–
ACT (10)	10: Chris Baillie; Mark Cameron; Karen Chhour; Simon Court; James McDowall; Nicole McKee; Toni Severin; David Seymour; Damien Smith; Brooke Van Velden	–	–	–
Māori Party (2)	–	–	–	2: Debbie Ngarewa-Packer; Rawiri Waititi
Totals	100	15	2	3

=== Select committee stage ===
Following the first reading, the Bill was referred to Parliament's health select committee. Public submissions were open until 28 April 2021. At the time, the health select committee's membership consisted of the chairperson Liz Craig, Chris Bishop, Elizabeth Kerekere, Neru Leavasa, Tracey McLellan, Debbie Ngarewa-Packer, Sarah Pallett, Gaurav Sharma, Penny Simmonds, Tangi Utikere, Brooke van Velden, Simon Watts, and Jan Logie. The Bill received 890 submissions from interested groups and individuals. 97 submitters submitted their petitions either in person at Wellington or via video conference.

The Attorney-General David Parker also advised the Health select committee on the provisions of the Bill. He expressed concerns about the broad scope of the "communicating" provision of the Bill, which in his assessment clashed with Section 14 of the New Zealand Bill of Rights Act 1990. As a result, Section 13A of the Bill was amended to narrow the criteria for behaviour prohibited in safe areas including:

- Visually recording people in a safe area; advising or persuading abortion users and providers from accessing or providing abortion services;
- Informing abortion services users and providers about matters relating to the provision of abortion services unless it was when the abortion services were being provided;
- Engaging in protests against abortion services;
- Removing the definitions of "prohibited behaviour" and "protected person."

The Attorney-General subsequently approved the Health select committee's changes to the Bill on 25 August 2021.

=== Second Reading ===
The Bill's second reading was first held on 10 November 2021. The bill's initiator Wall outlined the amendments that the Health select committee had made to the bill following advice from the Attorney-General. Labour MP Sarah Pallett also spoke in defence of the bill, asserting that it did not criminalise "peaceful prayer" in a safe area while proscribing intimidatory behaviour such as recording abortion services users and providers. National MP Simon Watts expressed support for the bill on the grounds that it protected women seeking abortion services.

The second reading of the Bill adjourned on 15 February 2022. Several speakers spoke in favour of the Bill while none of its opponents spoke during that debate. Labour MP Vanushi Walters spoke about the harassment, intimidation, and obstruction encountered by women seeking abortion services from anti-abortion activists. Similar sentiments were echoed by fellow Labour MP Rachel Brooking. Both National MP Mark Mitchell and Labour MP Priyanca Radhakrishnan argued that the bill did not infringe on the right to protest but protected the rights of women and families to access abortion services while under extreme stress.

Labour MP Kieran McAnulty argued that anti-abortion opponents were entitled to their views but did not have the right to obstruct others from accessing abortion services. Green MP Jan Logie justified the necessity of the Bill in response to the surge in aggressive anti-abortion activism at abortion providers. She also spoke about the assault on Greens co-leader James Shaw by an anti-abortion activist in 2019.

Labour MPs Willow-Jean Prime, David Clark, and Ginny Andersen argued that the Bill struck the right balance between protecting the rights of women to access abortion services and anti-abortion supporters' right to freedom of expression. Similar sentiments were expressed by ACT Party deputy leader Brooke van Velden and National MP Chris Bishop. The ACT Party and Bishop had both initially opposed the inclusion of safe areas in the Abortion Legislation Act 2020 but had since revised their positions on the grounds the Safe Areas Amendment Bill struck the right balance between protecting individual rights and free speech. National MP Joseph Mooney also spoke in favor of the revisions of the Bill made by the Attorney-General. Satisfied with these changes, Mooney voted in favour of the Bill during its second reading.

Following the debate, support for the Bill among Members of Parliament increased further by a margin of 108–12. The Greens, ACT and Maori Party all bloc-voted for the legislation. While 62 Labor MPs and 24 National MPs voted in favor of the Bill using their conscience votes, three Labour MPs and nine National MPs voting against it when debate ended. Of the Labour caucus, Anahila Kanongata'a-Suisuiki and Jamie Strange maintained their opposition to the bill, while Rino Tirikatene switched from voting against at the first reading to voting in favour, whereas Neru Leavasa changed his vote in the opposite direction. Michael Wood also supported the bill during its second reading, after not casting any vote at the first reading.

The membership of the National caucus had changed slightly since the first reading, with Nick Smith, who voted against the bill during its first reading, being replaced by Harete Hipango, who also voted against the bill. Simeon Brown, Simon O'Connor, Chris Penk, Penny Simmonds and Louise Upston continued their opposition to the bill. The party's new leader Christopher Luxon and MPs David Bennett, Jacqui Dean, Mooney, Scott Simpson and Tim van de Molen switched to supporting the bill. Michael Woodhouse switched from support to opposition, while Melissa Lee and Maureen Pugh also voted against, having recorded abstaining votes at the first reading.

Voting at second reading (15 February 2022)
Party	Voted for	Voted against
Labour (65)	62: Kiri Allan; Ginny Andersen; Jacinda Ardern; Camilla Belich; Glen Bennett; Rachel Boyack; Rachel Brooking; Naisi Chen; David Clark; Tāmati Coffey; Liz Craig; Kelvin Davis; Paul Eagle; Barbara Edmonds; Kris Faafoi; Shanan Halbert; Peeni Henare; Emily Henderson; Chris Hipkins; Willie Jackson; Ingrid Leary; Steph Lewis; Andrew Little; Anna Lorck; Marja Lubeck; Jo Luxton; Nanaia Mahuta; Trevor Mallard; Kieran McAnulty; Tracey McLellan; Stuart Nash; Terisa Ngobi; Damien O'Connor; Greg O'Connor; Ibrahim Omer; Sarah Pallett; David Parker; Willow-Jean Prime; Priyanca Radhakrishnan; Angela Roberts; Grant Robertson; Adrian Rurawhe; Deborah Russell; Jenny Salesa; Carmel Sepuloni; Gaurav Sharma; William Sio; Jan Tinetti; Rino Tirikatene; Phil Twyford; Tangi Utikere; Ayesha Verrall; Louisa Wall; Vanushi Walters; Angie Warren-Clark; Duncan Webb; Meka Whaitiri; Helen White; Arena Williams; Poto Williams; Michael Wood; Megan Woods	3: Anahila Kanongata'a-Suisuiki; Neru Leavasa; Jamie Strange
National (33)	24: Andrew Bayly; David Bennett; Chris Bishop; Simon Bridges; Gerry Brownlee; Judith Collins; Jacqui Dean; Matt Doocey; Paul Goldsmith; Nicola Grigg; Barbara Kuriger; Christopher Luxon; Todd McClay; Ian McKelvie; Mark Mitchell; Joseph Mooney; Todd Muller; Shane Reti; Scott Simpson; Stuart Smith; Erica Stanford; Tim van de Molen; Simon Watts; Nicola Willis	9: Simeon Brown; Harete Hipango; Melissa Lee; Simon O'Connor; Chris Penk; Maureen Pugh; Penny Simmonds; Louise Upston; Michael Woodhouse
Green (10)	10: Marama Davidson; Julie Anne Genter; Golriz Ghahraman; Elizabeth Kerekere; Jan Logie; Ricardo Menéndez March; Eugenie Sage; James Shaw; Chlöe Swarbrick; Teanau Tuiono	—
ACT (10)	10: Chris Baillie; Mark Cameron; Karen Chhour; Simon Court; James McDowall; Nicole McKee; Toni Severin; David Seymour; Damien Smith; Brooke Van Velden	—
Māori Party (2)	2: Debbie Ngarewa-Packer; Rawiri Waititi	–
Totals	108	12

=== Committee of the Whole House stage ===
The next stage of the legislative process was the Committee of the Whole House, which took place on 2 March 2022. No MPs proposed amendments or sought to debate any clause of the bill, so the Committee rapidly passed it without any changes, with a single vote being held on all clauses. The result of 98 in favour, 12 opposed saw MPs take the same positions that they had for the second reading vote, excepting that ten National MPs (Chris Bishop, Gerry Brownlee, Judith Collins, Matt Doocey, Ian McKelvie, Joseph Mooney, Todd Muller, Shane Reti, Scott Simpson and Erica Stanford) who had voted for the second reading cast no vote on this occasion. The bill proceeded to its third reading.

=== Third Reading ===
The CSA (Safe Areas) Amendment Bill was read for its third time on 16 March 2022. National MPs Simon O'Connor and Chris Penk were the only opponents of the bill who spoke in the final debate. The Bill's sponsor Louisa Wall spoke in favour of the Bill. Other MPs who spoke in favour of the Bill included National MP Simon Watts, Labour MPs Liz Craig, Emily Henderson, Camilla Belich, Sarah Pallett, Vanushi Walters, Guarav Sharma, Green MP Jan Logie, ACT leader David Seymour, and fellow ACT MP Karen Chhour. Following the debate, the bill passed by margin of 108 to 12 votes. Twelve MPs (nine from National and three from Labour) voted against the bill while 62 Labour MPs, 24 National MPs, and the entire Green, ACT and Maori Party parliamentary caucuses voted for the bill.

Voting at third reading (16 March 2022)
Party	Voted for	Voted against
Labour (65)	62: Kiri Allan; Ginny Andersen; Jacinda Ardern; Camilla Belich; Glen Bennett; Rachel Boyack; Rachel Brooking; Naisi Chen; David Clark; Tāmati Coffey; Liz Craig; Kelvin Davis; Paul Eagle; Barbara Edmonds; Kris Faafoi; Shanan Halbert; Peeni Henare; Emily Henderson; Chris Hipkins; Willie Jackson; Ingrid Leary; Steph Lewis; Andrew Little; Anna Lorck; Marja Lubeck; Jo Luxton; Nanaia Mahuta; Trevor Mallard; Kieran McAnulty; Tracey McLellan; Stuart Nash; Terisa Ngobi; Damien O'Connor; Greg O'Connor; Ibrahim Omer; Sarah Pallett; David Parker; Willow-Jean Prime; Priyanca Radhakrishnan; Angela Roberts; Grant Robertson; Adrian Rurawhe; Deborah Russell; Jenny Salesa; Carmel Sepuloni; Gaurav Sharma; William Sio; Jan Tinetti; Rino Tirikatene; Phil Twyford; Tangi Utikere; Ayesha Verrall; Louisa Wall; Vanushi Walters; Angie Warren-Clark; Duncan Webb; Meka Whaitiri; Helen White; Arena Williams; Poto Williams; Michael Wood; Megan Woods	3: Anahila Kanongata'a-Suisuiki; Neru Leavasa; Jamie Strange
National (33)	24: Andrew Bayly; David Bennett; Chris Bishop; Simon Bridges; Gerry Brownlee; Judith Collins; Jacqui Dean; Matt Doocey; Paul Goldsmith; Nicola Grigg; Barbara Kuriger; Christopher Luxon; Todd McClay; Ian McKelvie; Mark Mitchell; Joseph Mooney; Todd Muller; Shane Reti; Scott Simpson; Stuart Smith; Erica Stanford; Tim van de Molen; Simon Watts; Nicola Willis	9: Simeon Brown; Harete Hipango; Melissa Lee; Simon O'Connor; Chris Penk; Maureen Pugh; Penny Simmonds; Louise Upston; Michael Woodhouse
Green (10)	10: Marama Davidson; Julie Anne Genter; Golriz Ghahraman; Elizabeth Kerekere; Jan Logie; Ricardo Menéndez March; Eugenie Sage; James Shaw; Chlöe Swarbrick; Teanau Tuiono	—
ACT (10)	10: Chris Baillie; Mark Cameron; Karen Chhour; Simon Court; James McDowall; Nicole McKee; Toni Severin; David Seymour; Damien Smith; Brooke Van Velden	—
Māori Party (2)	2: Debbie Ngarewa-Packer; Rawiri Waititi	–
Totals	108	12

On 18 March 2022, the new legislation received Royal Assent from the Governor General of New Zealand.

== Responses ==
=== Support ===
Following the Bill's first reading in February 2021, the abortion rights advocacy group Abortion Law Reform Association of New Zealand (ALRANZ) welcomed the proposed creation of safe areas, stating that "Freedom of expression does not include the right to target a captive audience and force them to listen to your message."

Following the Bill's second reading in February 2022, ALRANZ welcomed the strong cross-party support for the legislation but expressed concerns about what the perceived "cumbersome" process for establishing safe areas. They also called on the 12 MPs who voted against the Bill to reconsider their positions. ALRANZ argued that the Bill did not ask MPs to endorse abortion but rather to address the question of whether abortion patients and providers should be protected from intimidation and violence. On 16 March 2022, ALRANZ and the New Zealand Family Planning Association welcomed the Bill's passage into law.

=== Opposition ===
In late February 2021, the anti-abortion advocacy group Right to Life New Zealand's spokesperson Ken Orr criticised the CSA (Safe Areas) Amendment Bill, claiming that it violated the rights to free speech, assembly and association.

Following the Bill's third reading on 16 March 2022, the anti-abortion groups Family Life International New Zealand, Voice for Life and Right to Life New Zealand issued statements denouncing its passage into law.

== See also ==
- Legal protection of access to abortion
