= 53rd New Zealand Parliament =

New Zealand parliamentary term from 2020 to 2023

53rd Parliament of New Zealand
←	52nd Parliament	54th Parliament	→
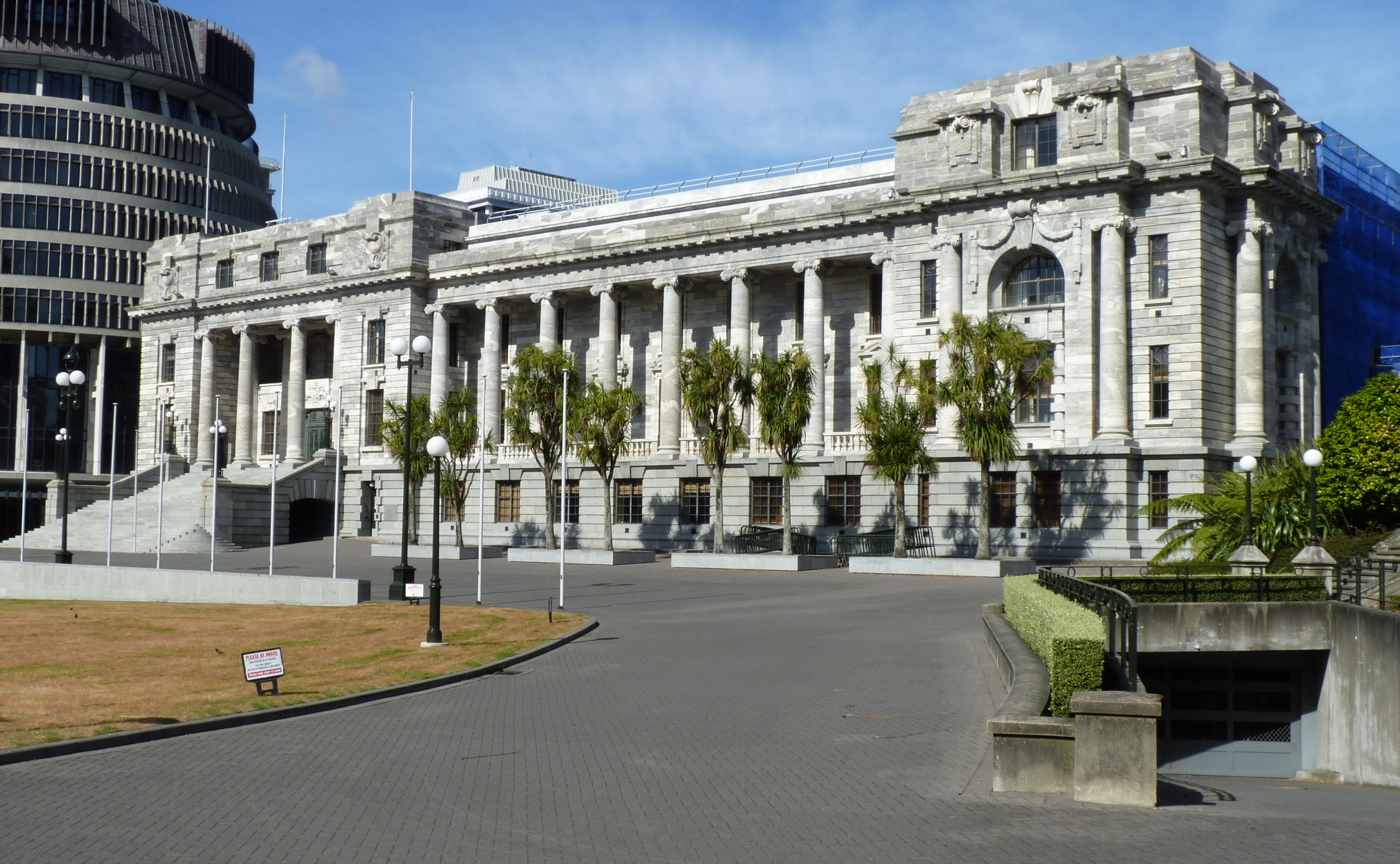
- Parliament House, Wellington

Overview
- Legislative body: New Zealand Parliament
- Term: 25 November 2020 – 8 September 2023
- Election: 2020 general election
- Government: Sixth Labour Government
- Website: www.parliament.nz

House of Representatives
- Members: 120
- Speaker of the House: Adrian Rurawhe — Trevor Mallard until 24 August 2022
- Leader of the House: Grant Robertson — Chris Hipkins until 25 January 2023
- Prime Minister: Chris Hipkins — Jacinda Ardern until 25 January 2023
- Leader of the Opposition: Christopher Luxon from 30 November 2021 — Judith Collins until 25 November 2021

Sovereign
- Monarch: Charles III — Elizabeth II until 8 September 2022
- Governor-General: Cindy Kiro from 21 October 2021 — Patsy Reddy until 28 September 2021

Terms of the
New Zealand Parliament

1st | 2nd | 3rd | 4th | 5th
6th | 7th | 8th | 9th | 10th
11th | 12th | 13th | 14th | 15th
16th | 17th | 18th | 19th | 20th
21st | 22nd | 23rd | 24th | 25th
26th | 27th | 28th | 29th | 30th
31st | 32nd | 33rd | 34th | 35th
36th | 37th | 38th | 39th | 40th
41st | 42nd | 43rd | 44th | 45th
46th | 47th | 48th | 49th | 50th
51st | 52nd | 53rd | 54th | 55th

The 53rd New Zealand Parliament was a meeting of the legislature in New Zealand. It opened on 25 November 2020 following the 17 October 2020 general election, and dissolved on 8 September 2023 to trigger the next election. It consisted of 120 members of Parliament (MPs) with five parties represented: the Labour and Green parties, in government, and the National, Māori and ACT parties, in opposition. The Sixth Labour Government held a majority in this Parliament. Jacinda Ardern continued as prime minister until her resignation on 25 January 2023; she was succeeded by Chris Hipkins.

The Parliament was elected using a mixed-member proportional representation (MMP) voting system. MPs represented 72 geographical electorates: 16 in the South Island, 49 in the North Island and 7 Māori electorates. This was an increase of one electorate seat from the previous election, as a result of population growth in the North Island. The remaining MPs were elected from party lists using the Webster/Sainte-Laguë method to realise proportionality.

== Background ==
=== Electorate changes ===
To achieve proportionality across electorates, there were a number of changes required to electorates based on population data determined through the 2018 census and projected population growth. As such, the number of geographical electorates increased by one compared to the 2017 election to account for the North Island's higher population growth, creating Takanini, and 30 general electorates and five Māori electorates had their boundaries adjusted so that each electorate contains roughly the same number of people.

=== 2020 general election ===
The 2020 general election was held on 17 October, after being delayed from 19 September due to a resurgence of COVID-19 cases during the COVID-19 pandemic in New Zealand. The dissolution of the 52nd Parliament was originally set for 12 August, and was delayed first to 17 August and finally to 6 September 2020.

The 2020 election resulted in a majority for the Labour Party, winning 65 seats, allowing them to continue the Sixth Labour Government unrestricted. Their coalition partner from the 52nd Parliament, New Zealand First, did not receive enough votes to pass the five percent threshold or win in an electorate, kicking them out of Parliament. Confidence and supply partner the Green Party received 10 seats, up two, becoming the first minor party ever to increase their share of the vote following their being in government. In the opposition, the National Party lost 23 seats, giving them a total of 33, and ACT New Zealand went from one seat to ten. The Māori Party won the Waiariki electorate and gained an additional list seat after losing representation in the 2017 general election.

=== Government formation ===
Labour achieved a majority in the 2020 election, allowing them to form a government without any coalition agreements having to be made. However, Prime Minister Jacinda Ardern entered talks with the Green Party about "potential areas of co-operation" in the formation of the new government. After two weeks of discussions, the Green Party reached an agreement with Labour on 31 October to become part of the next Government, with co-leaders James Shaw and Marama Davidson receiving ministerial positions outside of cabinet. Shaw remained Minister for Climate Change and become Associate Minister for the Environment, while Davidson became Minister for the Prevention of Family and Sexual Violence and Associate Minister of Housing. The new government was sworn in on 6 November 2020. Some ministerial positions changed in July 2021. Ardern was succeeded as prime minister by Chris Hipkins on 25 January 2023, following her resignation.

== Parliamentary term ==
The writ for the 2020 election was returned on 20 November 2020 after being delayed from its original set date of 12 November due to election recounts. Under section 19 of Constitution Act 1986, Parliament must meet no later than six weeks after this date; on 6 November 2020, following the new government's first Cabinet meeting, Prime Minister Jacinda Ardern confirmed that the Commission Opening and State Opening of Parliament would take place on 25 and 26 November 2020, respectively.

The 53rd Parliament is the first parliament since the 44th New Zealand Parliament (and the introduction of an MMP electoral system) to have a single party hold an outright majority of seats. The Labour Party currently holds 64 seats, 3 more than the required 61 seats needed for a majority.

=== Timeline ===
- 1 November 2020 – The Green Party enter into a "cooperation agreement" with Labour
- 6 November 2020 –
  - Jacinda Ardern is sworn in for a second term as prime minister. Other ministers are also sworn in.
  - Final results of the 2020 election are released. Three electorates flip to Labour, and National lose two seats on the party vote, with Labour and the Māori Party picking up one each.
  - Gerry Brownlee resigns as Deputy Leader of the National Party.
- 10 November 2020 – Shane Reti is elected Deputy Leader of the National Party.
- 20 November 2020 – The writ of the election is returned (having been delayed from 12 November due to a judicial recount).
- 25 November 2020 – Commission Opening of Parliament
- 26 November 2020 – State Opening of Parliament
- 20 May 2021 – Budget 2021 is delivered to Parliament.
- 25 November 2021 – Judith Collins is removed as Leader of the National Party by a caucus vote of no confidence.
- 30 November 2021 – Christopher Luxon and Nicola Willis are elected Leader and Deputy Leader of the National Party.
- 20 May 2022 – Budget 2022 is delivered to Parliament.
- 18 June 2022 – Tauranga by-election.
- 10 December 2022 – Hamilton West by-election.
- 19 January 2023 – Jacinda Ardern announces resignation.
- 23 January 2023 – Chris Hipkins is elected Leader of the Labour Party.
- 25 January 2023 – Chris Hipkins and Carmel Sepuloni are sworn in as prime minister and deputy prime minister.
- 18 May 2023 – Budget 2023 is devliered to Parliament.

=== Major legislation ===
On 1 March 2021, the Local Electoral (Māori Wards and Māori Constituencies) Amendment Act 2021 received royal assent after being introduced by Nanaia Mahuta on 9 February. This Act eliminates mechanisms for holding public referendums on the establishment of Māori wards and constituencies on local bodies, which allowed the public to veto a council's decision to introduce a Māori ward.

On 30 September 2021, the Counter-Terrorism Legislation Act 2021 passed its third reading. This Act criminalised the planning of terror attacks and expanded Police powers to conduct warrantless searches. It was supported by the Labour and National parties but was opposed by the Green, ACT and Māori parties.

On 24 November 2021, the COVID-19 Response (Vaccinations) Legislation Act 2021 passed its third reading. This Act allows businesses to dismiss employees who refuse to take COVID-19 vaccines.

On 15 December 2021, the Resource Management (Enabling Housing Supply and Other Matters) Amendment Act 2021 passed its third and final reading with the support of all parties except ACT. The Act seeks to address the national housing shortage by easing the process for building houses in major cities.

On 15 February 2022, the Conversion Practices Prohibition Legislation Act 2022 passed its third reading, becoming law with broad cross-party support. The Act banned conversion therapy in New Zealand.

On 9 March 2022, Parliament unanimously passed the Russia Sanctions Act 2022, which established a sanctions-implementation regime targeting Russia in response to the Russian invasion of Ukraine.

On 18 March 2022, the Contraception, Sterilisation, and Abortion (Safe Areas) Amendment Act 2022 received royal assent. The Bill creates safe spaces of about 150 metres around abortion providers and also bans obstructing, filming, dissuading or protesting against individuals seeking abortion services in those zones.

On 7 June 2022, the Government's Pae Ora (Healthy Futures) Act 2022 passed its third reading. The Bill replaced the country's existing district health boards with a new Crown agency called Health New Zealand and established as separate Māori Health Authority. The Health Futures Act also established a new Public Health Agency within the Ministry of Health while strengthening the Ministry's stewardship role.

On 9 August 2022, the Government's Three Strikes Legislation Repeal Act 2022 passed its third reading, repealing the Sentencing and Parole Reform Act 2010. The Three Strikes Legislation Repeal Act removed the three strikes law from New Zealand legislation. While the bill was supported by the Labour, Green, and Māori parties, it was opposed by the National and ACT parties.

On 13 December, the Smokefree Environments and Regulated Products (Smoked Tobacco) Amendment Act 2022 passed its third reading and became law. The bill banned tobacco from being sold to anyone born after 1 January 2009, limited the number of retailers allowed to sell tobacco, and lowered the nicotine content in tobacco products.

On 16 August 2023, the Water Services Entities Amendment Act 2023 passed its third reading. The bill increased the number of water services entities from four to ten, and delayed the start of the entities from 2024 to 2026. That same day, the Government passed the Natural and Built Environment Act 2023 and the Spatial Planning Act 2023, the first two laws in its planned revamp of the Resource Management Act 1991.

On 23 August, the Government passed two final bills entrenching the Water Services Reform Programme ("Three Waters"): the Water Services Economic Efficiency and Consumer Protection Act 2023 and Water Services Legislation Act 2023. The first bill sets up an economic regulation regime overseen by the Commerce Commission as a watchdog over the water services entities' quality and efficiency. The second bill outlines the duties, functions, and powers of the new water services entities that would come into effect in 2026.

=== Workplace culture ===
In 2019, following allegations of workplace misconduct by Meka Whaitiri, Jami-Lee Ross, and Maggie Barry in the 52nd Parliament the Speaker of the House Trevor Mallard commissioned a review into bullying and harassment in Parliament.

In the 53rd Parliament, Parliamentary Services started to implement the 85 recommendations from the review into workplace culture. Despite this, allegations of workplace misconduct continued. These allegations include:

- Nick Smith bullying his staff, with allegations from 2020 leading to his resignation in 2021.
- Gaurav Sharma being bullied by the Labour Whips office, the Prime Minister's office, and by Parliamentary Services.
- Anna Lorck bullying her staff.

The 53rd Parliament also saw four MPs referred to Parliament's Privileges Committee for various infractions:

- Education Minister and Labour MP Jan Tinetti was referred to the Committee on 8 June 2023 for misleading Parliament about truancy statistics. In late June 2023, the Committee ruled Tinetti had not intentionally misled Parliament but had shown a "high degree of negligence." Tinetti apologised to Parliament.
- ACT MP Simon Court was referred to the Committee on 20 June 2023 for disclosing the Environment select committee's vote relating to the Natural and Built Environment Act 2023. On 26 July, the Privileges Committee found that Court had committed a "clear breach" of select committee confidentiality. Court apologised for his action.
- Transport, Workplace Relations and Auckland Minister and Labour MP Michael Wood was referred to the Committee on 18 July for failing to declare his shares in Auckland Airport, Chorus, Spark, and National Australia Bank. The Committee found that he had neglected his duties but that his actions did not amount to contempt. Wood was ordered to apologise to Parliament for not managing his conflicts of interest.
- National Party MP Tim van de Molen was referred to the committee on 1 August 2023 for allegedly threatening Labour MP Shanan Halbert during a select committee hearing. On 24 August, the committee ruled that Van De Molen had threatened Halbert, and was in contempt of Parliament. He accepted the committee's findings and issued a public apology.

=== Dissolution ===
Under section 17 of the Constitution Act 1986, Parliament expires a maximum of three years "from the day fixed for the return of the writs issued for the last preceding general election of members of the House of Representatives, and no longer". The writs were issued on 13 September 2020 and were returned on 20 November 2020, meaning that the 53rd Parliament must dissolve on or before 20 November 2023. The 2023 general election is scheduled to be held on 14 October and the 53rd Parliament is scheduled to be dissolved on 8 September.

== Officeholders ==
=== Presiding officers ===
- Speaker of the House:
  - Rt. Hon. Adrian Rurawhe (Labour) from 24 August 2022
  - Rt. Hon. Trevor Mallard (Labour) until 24 August 2022
- Deputy Speaker of the House:
  - Greg O'Connor (Labour) from 25 August 2022
  - Adrian Rurawhe (Labour) until 24 August 2022
- Assistant Speaker of the House: Hon. Jenny Salesa (Labour)
- Assistant Speaker of the House: Hon. Jacqui Dean (National)
- Assistant Speaker of the House: Ian McKelvie (National) from 1 March 2022 (Note: McKelvie was appointed to serve as an additional Assistant Speaker while the House sits with members participating remotely, as a consequence of the COVID-19 pandemic.)

==== Other parliamentary officers ====
- Clerk: David Wilson
- Deputy Clerk: Suze Jones
- Serjeant-at-Arms: Steve Streefkerk

=== Party leaders ===
- Prime Minister of New Zealand (Labour):
  - Rt. Hon. Chris Hipkins from 25 January 2023 (Note: Hipkins succeeded Ardern as Labour Party leader on 22 January 2023 but was not warranted as Prime Minister until 25 January 2023.)
  - Rt. Hon. Jacinda Ardern until 25 January 2023
    - Deputy Leader of the Labour Party: Hon. Kelvin Davis
    - Deputy Prime Minister of New Zealand:
      - Hon. Carmel Sepuloni from 25 January 2023
      - Hon. Grant Robertson until 25 January 2023
- Leader of the Opposition (National):
  - Christopher Luxon from 30 November 2021
  - Hon. Judith Collins until 25 November 2021
    - Deputy Leader of the Opposition (National):
      - Nicola Willis from 30 November 2021
      - Shane Reti until 30 November 2021
- Co-leaders of the Green Party of Aotearoa New Zealand:
  - Female Co-leader: Hon. Marama Davidson
  - Any-gender Co-leader: Hon. James Shaw (except between 25 July and 10 September 2022)
- Leader of ACT New Zealand: David Seymour
  - Deputy Leader of ACT New Zealand: Brooke van Velden
- Co-leaders of the Māori Party:
  - Female Co-leader: Debbie Ngarewa-Packer
  - Male Co-leader: Rawiri Waititi

=== Floor leaders ===
- Leader of the House:
  - Hon. Grant Robertson from 25 January 2023
  - Hon. Chris Hipkins until 25 January 2023
    - Deputy Leader of the House:
      - Hon. Kieran McAnulty from 14 June 2022
      - Hon. Michael Wood until 14 June 2022
- Shadow Leader of the House:
  - Chris Bishop from 16 July 2020 to 27 August 2021 and from 6 December 2021 to 19 January 2023
  - Hon. Michael Woodhouse from 28 August 2021 to 6 December 2021 and from 19 January 2023
    - Deputy Shadow Leader of the House:
      - Hon. Michael Woodhouse until 28 August 2021 and from 6 December 2021 to 19 January 2023
      - Simeon Brown from 28 August 2021 to 6 December 2021 and from 19 January 2023

=== Whips ===
- Senior Government (Labour) Whip:
  - Tangi Utikere from 31 January 2023
  - Duncan Webb from 14 June 2022 until 31 January 2023
  - Kieran McAnulty until 14 June 2022
    - Junior Government (Labour) Whips:
      - Camilla Belich from 31 January 2023
      - Shanan Halbert from 31 January 2023
      - Tracey McLellan from 31 January 2023
      - Barbara Edmonds until 31 January 2023
      - Willow-Jean Prime until 31 January 2023
      - Tangi Utikere from 14 June 2022 until 31 January 2023
      - Duncan Webb until 14 June 2022
- Senior Opposition (National) Whip:
  - Chris Penk from 7 December 2021
  - Matt Doocey until 7 December 2021
    - Junior Opposition Whip: Maureen Pugh
- Green Party Whip (Musterer): Jan Logie
  - Green Party Deputy Musterer: Elizabeth Kerekere
- ACT New Zealand Whip: Brooke van Velden
- Māori Party Whip (Matarau): Debbie Ngarewa-Packer

=== Shadow cabinets ===
- Opposition Cabinet of Christopher Luxon during the 53rd Parliament from 30 November 2021
  - Opposition Cabinet of Judith Collins during the 53rd Parliament from 11 November 2020 to 25 November 2021

== Members ==
The table below shows the members of the 53rd Parliament based on the results of the 2020 general election. Ministerial roles were officially announced on 2 November 2020. Based on preliminary results, there were 40 new MPs. When final results were announced on 6 November, this rose to 42 new members. Labour lost a member on 23 August 2022 due to the expulsion of Gaurav Sharma from the parliamentary party. After Sharma's resignation from parliament, the December 2022 by-election for his Hamilton West electorate was won by National.

=== Overview ===

This table shows the number of MPs in each party:

Affiliation	Members	
Affiliation	At 2020 election	At dissolution
Labour	65	62
Government total	65	62
Green ^{C}	10	9
Government with Cooperation total	75	71
National	33	34
ACT	10	10
Maori Party	2	2
Independent	0	2
Opposition total	45	48
Total MPs in Parliament	120	119
Working Government majority	10	6
Working Government with Cooperation majority	30	26

Notes

- ^C The Green Party entered into a cooperation agreement with the Labour Party on 1 November 2020 in which they agreed not to oppose confidence and supply. This differs from a confidence and supply agreement that has been a feature of New Zealand governments, in which minor political parties agree to explicitly support confidence and supply.
- The Working Government majority is calculated as all Government MPs less all opposition parties. It excludes the Green Party which can either support or abstain from confidence and supply. The Working Government with Cooperation majority includes the Green Party.

=== Members ===
Labour (62)
Rank	Name	Electorate (list if blank)	Term in office	Portfolios & Responsibilities
Ministers in Cabinet
1	Chris Hipkins	Remutaka	2008–	Prime Minister; Leader of the Labour Party; Minister for National Security and Intelligence; Minister Responsible for Ministerial Services; Chair of the Intelligence and Security Committee
2	Carmel Sepuloni	Kelston	2008–11; 2014–	Deputy Prime Minister; Minister for Social Development and Employment; Minister for Arts, Culture and Heritage; Associate Minister of Foreign Affairs (Pacific Region)
3	Kelvin Davis	Te Tai Tokerau	2008–11; 2014–	Deputy Leader of the Labour Party; Minister for Māori Crown Relations: Te Arawhiti; Minister for Children; Minister of Corrections; Associate Minister of Education (Māori Education)
4	Grant Robertson	Wellington Central	2008–	Minister of Finance; Minister for Sport and Recreation; Minister for Cyclone Recovery; Leader of the House
5	Megan Woods	Wigram	2011–	Minister of Housing; Minister for Infrastructure; Minister of Energy and Resources; Minister for Building and Construction; Associate Minister of Finance
6	Jan Tinetti		2017–	Minister of Education; Minister for Women; Minister for Child Poverty Reduction
7	Michael Wood	Mount Roskill	2016–	Minister of Immigration; Minister of Transport; Minister for Workplace Relations and Safety; Minister for Auckland; Associate Minister of Finance
8	Ayesha Verrall		2020–	Minister of Health; Minister for Research, Science and Innovation
9	Willie Jackson		1999–2002; 2017–	Minister for Broadcasting and Media; Minister for Māori Development; Associate Minister for ACC; Associate Minister of Housing (Māori Housing); Associate Minister for Social Development and Employment (Māori Employment)
10	Kiri Allan	East Coast	2017–2023	Minister of Justice; Minister for Regional Development; Associate Minister of Transport
11	Damien O'Connor	West Coast-Tasman	1993–2008; 2009–	Minister of Agriculture; Minister for Biosecurity; Minister for Land Information; Minister for Trade and Export Growth
12	Andrew Little		2011–	Minister of Defence; Minister Responsible for the GCSB; Minister Responsible for the NZSIS; Minister for the Public Services; Minister for Treaty of Waitangi Negotiations; Lead Coordination Minister for the Government’s Response to the Royal Commission’s Report into the Terrorist Attack on the Christchurch Mosques
13	David Parker		2002–	Attorney-General; Minister for the Environment; Minister of Revenue; Associate Minister of Finance; Chair of the Privileges Committee
14	Peeni Henare	Tāmaki Makaurau	2014–	Minister for ACC; Minister of Forestry; Minister of Tourism; Minister for Whānau Ora; Minister for Veterans; Associate Minister for the Environment; Associate Minister of Health (Māori Health)
15	Nanaia Mahuta	Hauraki-Waikato	1996–	Minister of Foreign Affairs; Minister of Disarmament and Arms Control; Associate Minister for Māori Development
16	Priyanca Radhakrishnan	Maungakiekie	2017–	Minister for the Community and Voluntary Sector; Minister for Disability Issues; Minister for Diversity, Inclusion and Ethnic Communities; Associate Minister for Social Development and Employment; Associate Minister for Workplace Relations and Safety
17	Kieran McAnulty	Wairarapa	2017–	Minister for Emergency Management; Minister of Local Government; Minister for Racing; Minister for Rural Communities; Deputy Leader of the House
18	Ginny Andersen	Hutt South	2017–	Minister for the Digital Economy and Communications; Minister for Seniors; Minister of Police; Minister for Small Business; Associate Minister of Immigration; Associate Minister for Treaty of Waitangi Negotiations; Chair of the Justice Committee
19	Barbara Edmonds	Mana	2020–	Minister of Internal Affairs; Minister for Pacific Peoples; Minister for Economic Development; Associate Minister of Health (Pacific Peoples); Associate Minister of Housing; Associate Minister for Cyclone Recovery; Chair of the Finance and Expenditure Committee
20	Willow-Jean Prime	Northland	2017–	Minister of Conservation; Minister for Youth; Associate Minister for Arts, Culture and Heritage; Associate Minister of Health
Ministers outside Cabinet
21	Duncan Webb	Christchurch Central	2017–	Minister of Commerce and Consumer Affairs; Minister for State Owned Enterprises
22	Rino Tirikatene	Te Tai Tonga	2011–	Minister for Courts; Minister of State for Trade and Export Growth
23	Deborah Russell	New Lynn	2017–	Minister of Statistics; Minister Responsible for the Earthquake Commission; Associate Minister of Justice; Associate Minister of Revenue; Chair of the Pae Ora Legislation Committee
24	Rachel Brooking		2020–	Minister for Oceans and Fisheries; Minister for Food Safety; Deputy Chair of the Regulations Review Committee; Deputy Chair of the Environment Committee
25	Jo Luxton	Rangitata	2017–	Minister of Customs; Associate Minister of Agriculture (Animal Welfare); Associate Minister of Education
Officers of Parliament
	Adrian Rurawhe	Te Tai Hauauru	2014–	Speaker of the House; Chair of the Business, Officers of Parliament and Standing Orders Committees
	Greg O'Connor	Ohariu	2017–	Deputy Speaker of the House
	Jenny Salesa	Panmure-Ōtāhuhu	2014–	Assistant Speaker of the House; Chair of the Foreign Affairs, Defence and Trade Committee
Members of Parliament
	Tangi Utikere	Palmerston North	2020–	Chief Government Whip; Chair of the Health Committee
26	Camilla Belich		2020–	Associate Whip; Deputy Chair of the Education and Workforce Committee
27	Tracey McLellan	Banks Peninsula	2020–	Assistant Whip; Deputy Chair of the Health Committee
28	Shanan Halbert	Northcote	2020–	Junior Whip; Chair of the Transport and Infrastructure Committee; Deputy Chair of the Petitions Committee
29	Phil Twyford	Te Atatū	2008–	
30	David Clark	Dunedin	2011–	
31	William Sio	Māngere	2008–	
32	Poto Williams	Christchurch East	2013–	
33	Vanushi Walters	Upper Harbour	2020–	Deputy Chair of the Justice Committee
34	Marja Lubeck		2017–	Chair of the Education and Workforce Committee
35	Angie Warren-Clark		2017–	Chair of the Social Services and Community Committee
36	Tāmati Coffey		2017–	Chair of the Māori Affairs Committee; Deputy Chair of the Pae Ora Legislation Committee
37	Naisi Chen		2020–	Deputy Chair of the Economic Development, Science and Innovation Committee
38	Jamie Strange	Hamilton East	2017–	Chair of the Economic Development, Science and Innovation Committee
39	Liz Craig		2017–	
40	Ibrahim Omer		2020–	
41	Anahila Kanongata'a-Suisuiki		2017–	
42	Paul Eagle	Rongotai	2017–	
43	Helen White		2020–	
44	Angela Roberts		2020–	
45	Neru Leavasa	Takanini	2020–	
46	Lemauga Lydia Sosene		2022–	
47	Steph Lewis	Whanganui	2020–	Deputy Chair of the Primary Production Committee
48	Dan Rosewarne		2022–	
49	Rachel Boyack	Nelson	2020–	Deputy Chair of the Governance and Administration Committee
50	Arena Williams	Manurewa	2020–	Deputy Chair of the Māori Affairs Committee
51	Ingrid Leary	Taieri	2020–	Deputy Chair of the Finance and Expenditure Committee
52	Soraya Peke-Mason		2022–	
53	Sarah Pallett	Ilam	2020–	
54	Emily Henderson	Whangārei	2020–	Deputy Chair of the Social Services and Community Committee
55	Terisa Ngobi	Ōtaki	2020–	
56	Glen Bennett	New Plymouth	2020–	
	Anna Lorck	Tukituki	2020–	
57	Stuart Nash	Napier	2008–2011; 2014–	
Members of the Labour caucus who resigned during the term of the 53rd Parliament
	Louisa Wall		2008; 2011–2022	Resigned May 2022
	Kris Faafoi		2010–2022	Resigned July 2022
	Trevor Mallard		1984–1990 1993–2022	Resigned October 2022
	Jacinda Ardern	Mount Albert	2008–2023	Resigned April 2023

Green Party of Aotearoa New Zealand (9)
Rank	Name	Electorate (list if blank)	Term in office	Portfolios & Responsibilities
Ministers outside Cabinet
1	Marama Davidson		2015–	Female Co-leader of the Green Party; Minister for the Prevention of Family and Sexual Violence; Associate Minister of Housing (Homelessness); Green Spokesperson for; Prevention of Family & Sexual Violence; Housing
2	James Shaw		2014–	Male Co-leader of the Green Party; Minister for Climate Change; Associate Minister for the Environment (Biodiversity); Green Spokesperson for; Climate Change; Environment (Biodiversity)
Members of Parliament
3	Chlöe Swarbrick	Auckland Central	2017–	Spokesperson for Animal Welfare; Spokesperson for Broadcasting; Spokesperson for the Digital Economy and Communications; Spokesperson for Drug Law Reform; Spokesperson for Economic Development; Spokesperson for Mental Health; Spokesperson for Revenue; Spokesperson for Small Business; Spokesperson for Tertiary Education; Spokesperson for Youth
4	Julie Anne Genter		2011–	Deputy Chair of the Transport and Infrastructure Committee; Spokesperson for Building and Construction; Spokesperson for COVID-19 Response; Spokesperson for Customs; Spokesperson for Energy and Resources; Spokesperson for Finance; Spokesperson for Infrastructure; Spokesperson for Local Government; Spokesperson for State Owned Enterprises; Spokesperson for Transport; Spokesperson for Urban Development
5	Jan Logie		2011–	Green Party Musterer; Spokesperson for ACC; Spokesperson for Child Poverty Reduction; Spokesperson for Children; Spokesperson for Disability; Spokesperson for State Services; Spokesperson for Te Tiriti O Waitangi; Spokesperson for Women; Spokesperson for Workplace Relations and Safety
6	Eugenie Sage		2011–	Chair of the Environment Committee; Spokesperson for Emergency Management; Spokesperson for Conservation; Spokesperson for the Earthquake Commission; Spokesperson for the Environment; Spokesperson for Oceans and Fisheries; Spokesperson for Forestry; Spokesperson for Land Information; Associate Spokesperson for Local Government (Three Waters)
7	Golriz Ghahraman		2017–	Spokesperson for Corrections; Spokesperson for Courts; Spokesperson for Defence; Spokesperson for Electoral Reform; Spokesperson for Ethnic Communities; Spokesperson for Foreign Affairs; Spokesperson for Human Rights; Spokesperson for Justice; Spokesperson for Police; Spokesperson for Refugees; Spokesperson for Trade
8	Teanau Tuiono		2020–	Spokesperson for Agriculture; Spokesperson for Biosecurity; Spokesperson for Education; Spokesperson for Internal Affairs; Associate Spokesperson for Oceans & Fisheries (Pacific Peoples); Spokesperson for Pacific Peoples; Spokesperson for Regional Economic Development; Spokesperson for Research, Science and Innovation; Spokesperson for Rural Communities; Spokesperson for Security and Intelligence
9	Ricardo Menéndez March		2020–	Spokesperson for Commerce and Consumer Affairs; Spokesperson for Food Safety; Spokesperson for Immigration; Spokesperson for Senior Citizens; Spokesperson for Social Development and Employment; Spokesperson for Sports and Recreation; Spokesperson for Tourism

National (34)
Rank	Name	Electorate (list if blank)	Term in office	Portfolios & Responsibilities
1	Christopher Luxon	Botany	2020–	Leader of the Opposition; Spokesperson for National Security and Intelligence
2	Nicola Willis		2018–	Deputy Leader of the Opposition; Spokesperson for Finance; Spokesperson for Social Investment
3	Chris Bishop		2014–	Spokesperson for Housing; Spokesperson for Infrastructure; Spokesperson for RMA Reform – Urban Development
4	Shane Reti		2014–	Spokesperson for Health; Spokesperson for COVID-19 Response; Spokesperson for Māori-Crown Relations; Spokesperson for Pacific Peoples
5	Paul Goldsmith		2011–	Spokesperson for Justice; Spokesperson for Workplace Relations and Safety; Spokesperson for Regulatory Reform
6	Louise Upston	Taupō	2008–	Spokesperson for Social Development and Employment; Spokesperson for Child Poverty Reduction; Spokesperson for Family Violence Prevention
7	Erica Stanford	East Coast Bays	2017–	Spokesperson for Education; Spokesperson for Immigration; Associate Spokesperson for Ethnic Communities
8	Matt Doocey	Waimakariri	2014–	Spokesperson for Mental Health and Suicide Prevention; Spokesperson for Youth; Associate Spokesperson for Health; Associate Spokesperson for Transport
9	Simeon Brown	Pakuranga	2017–	Spokesperson for Transport; Spokesperson for Auckland; Spokesperson for the Public Service; Deputy Shadow Leader of the House
10	Judith Collins	Papakura	2002–	Chair of the Regulations Review Committee; Spokesperson for Science, Innovation and Technology; Spokesperson for Foreign Direct Investment; Spokesperson for Land Information; Spokesperson for Digitising Government
11	Mark Mitchell	Whangaparāoa	2011–	Spokesperson for Police; Spokesperson for the Serious Fraud Office; Spokesperson for Counter-Terrorism; Spokesperson for Corrections
12	Todd Muller	Bay of Plenty	2011–	Spokesperson for Agriculture; Spokesperson for Climate Change
13	Melissa Lee		2008–	Spokesperson for Broadcasting and Media; Spokesperson for the Digital Economy and Communications; Spokesperson for Ethnic Communities
14	Andrew Bayly	Port Waikato	2014–	Spokesperson for Small Business; Spokesperson for Commerce and Consumer Affairs; Spokesperson for Manufacturing; Spokesperson for Revenue
15	Gerry Brownlee		1996–	Deputy Chair of the Foreign Affairs, Defence and Trade Committee; Spokesperson for Foreign Affairs; Spokesperson for the GCSB & NZSIS; Spokesperson for Emergency Management
16	Todd McClay	Rotorua	2008–	Spokesperson for Trade; Spokesperson for Tourism; Spokesperson for Hunting and Fishing
17	Michael Woodhouse		2008–	Spokesperson for State Owned Enterprises; Spokesperson for Economic Development; Spokesperson for Sport & Recreation; Shadow Leader of the House
18	Stuart Smith	Kaikōura	2014–	Spokesperson for Energy & Resources; Spokesperson for the Earthquake Commission; Spokesperson for Viticulture
19	Scott Simpson	Coromandel	2011–	Spokesperson for the Environment; Spokesperson for Water; Spokesperson for Oceans and Fisheries
20	Penny Simmonds	Invercargill	2020–	Spokesperson for Tertiary Education and Skills; Spokesperson for Workforce Planning; Spokesperson for Early Childhood Education; Associate Spokesperson for Education; Associate Spokesperson for Social Development and Employment
	Simon O'Connor	Tāmaki	2011–	Spokesperson for Customs; Spokesperson for Internal Affairs; Spokesperson for Arts, Culture and Heritage; Associate Spokesperson for Foreign Affairs
	Barbara Kuriger	Taranaki-King Country	2014–	Spokesperson for Conservation
	Maureen Pugh		2016–2017 2018–	Junior Whip; Spokesperson for Disability and Carers; Spokesperson for the Community and Voluntary Sector
	Harete Hipango		2017–2020; 2021–	Spokesperson for Whānau Ora; Spokesperson for Children/Oranga Tamariki
	Chris Penk	Kaipara ki Mahurangi	2017–	Senior Whip; Shadow Attorney-General; Spokesperson for Courts; Associate Spokesperson for Justice
	Tim van de Molen	Waikato	2017–	Spokesperson for Defence; Spokesperson for Veterans; Spokesperson for Building and Construction; Spokesperson for ACC
	Nicola Grigg	Selwyn	2020–	Spokesperson for Rural Communities; Spokesperson for Animal Welfare; Spokesperson for Biosecurity; Spokesperson for Food Safety; Spokesperson for Women; Associate Spokesperson for Agriculture
	Joseph Mooney	Southland	2020–	Spokesperson for Treaty of Waitangi Negotiations; Spokesperson for Forestry; Spokesperson for Space; Associate Spokesperson for Tourism; Associate Spokesperson for Agriculture
	Simon Watts	North Shore	2020–	Spokesperson for Local Government; Spokesperson for Regional Development; Spokesperson for Statistics; Associate Spokesperson for Finance; Associate Spokesperson for Infrastructure
	Sam Uffindell	Tauranga	2022–	Spokesperson for Horticulture; Associate Spokesperson for Science, Innovation and Technology
	Tama Potaka	Hamilton West	2022–	Spokesperson for Māori Development; Associate Spokesperson for Housing – Social Housing
	David Bennett		2005–	Spokesperson for Racing
	Jacqui Dean	Waitaki	2005–	Chair of the Petitions Committee; Assistant Speaker
	Ian McKelvie	Rangitīkei	2011–	Chair of the Governance and Administration Committee; Spokesperson for Seniors
Members of the National caucus who resigned during the term of the 53rd Parliament
	Nick Smith		1990–2021	Resigned June 2021
	Simon Bridges	Tauranga	2008–2022	Resigned May 2022

ACT New Zealand (10)
Rank	Name	Electorate (list if blank)	Term in office	Portfolios & Responsibilities
1	David Seymour	Epsom	2014–	Leader of ACT New Zealand; Spokesperson for Finance; Spokesperson for COVID-19 Response; Spokesperson for the Treaty of Waitangi
2	Brooke van Velden		2020–	Deputy Leader of ACT New Zealand; Party Whip; Spokesperson for Health; Spokesperson for Housing, Building and Construction; Spokesperson for Foreign Affairs; Spokesperson for Trade
3	Nicole McKee		2020–	Spokesperson for Firearms Law Reform; Spokesperson for Conservation; Spokesperson for Justice; Spokesperson for Veterans
4	Chris Baillie		2020–	Spokesperson for Small Business; Spokesperson for Workplace Relations and Safety; Spokesperson for Education; Spokesperson for Police
5	Simon Court		2020–	Spokesperson for the Environment; Spokesperson for Climate Change; Spokesperson for Infrastructure; Spokesperson for Transport; Spokesperson for Local Government; Spokesperson for Energy and Resources
6	James McDowall		2020–	Spokesperson for Economic Development; Spokesperson for Research, Science and Innovation; Spokesperson for Immigration; Spokesperson for Internal Affairs; Spokesperson for Defence; Spokesperson for Tourism; Spokesperson for Civil Defence
7	Karen Chhour		2020–	Spokesperson for Social Development; Spokesperson for Children; Spokesperson for Child Poverty Reduction
8	Mark Cameron		2020–	Spokesperson for Primary Industries; Spokesperson for Regional Economic Development; Spokesperson for Biosecurity; Spokesperson for Forestry; Spokesperson for Fisheries
9	Toni Severin		2020–	Spokesperson for ACC; Spokesperson for Corrections; Spokesperson for Disability Issues; Associate Spokesperson for Small Business
10	Damien Smith		2020–	Spokesperson for Broadcasting; Spokesperson for Land Information; Spokesperson for Commerce and Consumer Affairs; Spokesperson for State Owned Enterprises; Spokesperson for Statistics; Spokesperson for Revenue; Spokesperson for Racing; Spokesperson for Arts, Culture and Heritage; Spokesperson for Sport and Recreation; Associate Spokesperson for Finance

Māori Party (2)
Rank	Name	Electorate (list if blank)	Term in office	Portfolios & Responsibilities
1	Debbie Ngarewa-Packer		2020–	Female Co-leader of the Māori Party; Māori Party Whip (Matarau)
2	Rawiri Waititi	Waiariki	2020–	Male Co-leader of the Māori Party

Independent (2)
Name	Electorate (list if blank)	Term in office	Notes
Meka Whaitiri	Ikaroa-Rawhiti	2013–	Labour Party member until May 2023
Elizabeth Kerekere		2020–	Green Party member until May 2023
Members who resigned during the term of the 53rd Parliament
Gaurav Sharma	Hamilton West	2020–2022	Labour Party member until August 2022; Resigned October 2022

=== Demographics of elected MPs ===
The 2020 general election saw the election of New Zealand's first African MP (Ibrahim Omer), first Sri Lankan-born MP (Vanushi Walters) and first Latin American MP (Ricardo Menéndez March). Six new LGBT+ MPs were elected (Menéndez March, Glen Bennett, Ayesha Verrall, Shanan Halbert, Elizabeth Kerekere, Tangi Utikere), making the New Zealand House of Representatives the national parliament with the highest percentage of LGBT+ members in the world.

During the 53rd parliament, 60 MPs (50%) were women—the highest number since women were first allowed to stand for Parliament in 1919. The period between the swearing in of Soraya Peke-Mason and Tama Potaka was the first time there had been more women than men as MPs.

=== Changes ===
The following changes in Members of Parliament occurred during the term of the 53rd Parliament:

#	Seat	Incumbent				Replacement			
#	Seat	Party	Name	Date vacated	Reason	Party	Name	Date elected	Change
1.	List	Labour	Louisa Wall	1 May 2022	Resigned	Labour	Lemauga Lydia Sosene	2 May 2022	List
2.	List	National	Nick Smith	10 June 2021	Resigned	National	Harete Hipango	11 June 2021	List
3.	Tauranga	National	Simon Bridges	6 May 2022	Resigned	National	Sam Uffindell	18 June 2022	National hold (By-election)
4.	List	Labour	Kris Faafoi	23 July 2022	Resigned	Labour	Dan Rosewarne	25 July 2022	List
5.	Hamilton West	Labour	Gaurav Sharma	23 August 2022	Expelled from the Labour Party	Independent	Gaurav Sharma	23 August 2022	Independent gain
6.	Hamilton West	Independent	Gaurav Sharma	18 October 2022	Resigned	National	Tama Potaka	10 December 2022	National gain (By-election)
7.	List	Labour	Trevor Mallard	20 October 2022	Resigned	Labour	Soraya Peke-Mason	25 October 2022	List
8.	Mount Albert	Labour	Jacinda Ardern	15 April 2023	Resigned	None^{1}			
9.	Ikaroa-Rāwhiti	Labour	Meka Whaitiri	3 May 2023	Resigned from the Labour Party	Independent^{2}	Meka Whaitiri	3 May 2023	Independent gain
10.	List	Green	Elizabeth Kerekere	5 May 2023	Resigned from the Green Party	Independent	Elizabeth Kerekere	5 May 2023	Independent gain

^1 The resignation of Jacinda Ardern took place less than six months before the next general election and therefore a by-election to fill the vacancy was not required.

^2 Following the resignation of Meka Whaitiri from the Labour Party, she waka-jumped to Te Pāti Māori, but is regarded as an independent MP in Parliament.

== Seating plan ==
=== Start of term ===
The chamber is in a horseshoe-shape.

													Watts	Severin	D. Smith	G. Bennett
Dean	S. Smith	Muller	Brown	N. Smith	Penk	S. O'Connor	Stanford	McKelvie	van de Molen	Grigg	Luxon	Mooney	Simmonds	Chhour		March	Ngobi
Brownlee	Willis	Pugh	Doocey	Simpson	D. Bennett	Goldsmith	Mitchell	Kuriger	Ngarewa-Packer	McKee	Baillie	Court	McDowall		Cameron	Kerekere
Lee	Bishop	Reti	Collins	Bayly	Woodhouse	Upston	McClay	Bridges	Waititi	Seymour	van Velden	Shaw		Genter	Ghahraman	Tuiono	Henderson
													Davidson	Swarbrick	Sage
Mallard															Logie
Mallard															White
													Radhakrishnan	Strange	Brooking
Mahuta	Parker	Robertson	ARDERN	Davis	Woods	Hipkins	Sepuloni	Little	P. Williams	Sio	Whaitiri	Twyford		Luxton	Omer	Boyack	Sharma
D. O'Connor	Nash	Webb	McAnulty	Faafoi	Henare	Jackson	Tinetti	Wood	Wall	Lubeck	Warren-Clark	G. O'Connor	Coffey		Chen	Lewis	Pallett
Rurawhe	Salesa	Edmonds	Prime	Allan	Clark	Verrall	Tirikatene	Russell	Kanongata'a-Suisuiki	Craig	Andersen	Eagle	Walters	Belich	Leavasa	McLellan	Leary
													Roberts	Halbert	Lorck	Utikere	A. Williams

=== End of term ===
The chamber is in a horseshoe-shape.

													Uffindell	Potaka	Severin	Kerekere
Dean	S. Smith	Simpson	Simmonds	Watts	S. O'Connor	Kuriger	D. Bennett	McKelvie	Muller	van de Molen	Hipango	Mooney	Grigg	Chhour		D. Smith	Whaitiri
Collins	Mitchell	Pugh	Penk	Woodhouse	McClay	Lee	Bayly	Brownlee	Ngarewa-Packer	McKee	Baillie	Court	McDowall		Cameron	March
Brown	Doocey	Willis	Luxon	Bishop	Reti	Goldsmith	Upston	Stanford	Waititi	Seymour	van Velden	Shaw		Genter	Ghahraman	Tuiono	Vacant
													Davidson	Swarbrick	Sage
Rurawhe															Logie
Rurawhe															Lewis
													Luxton	Walters	Eagle
D. O'Connor	Verrall	Sepuloni	HIPKINS	Davis	Robertson	Woods	Tinetti	Jackson	Webb	Tirikatene	Russell	Brooking		Leary	G. Bennett	Boyack	Ngobi
Andersen	Little	Belich	Utikere	Parker	Henare	Mahuta	Radhakrishnan	McAnulty	Kanongata'a-Suisuiki	Twyford	Clark	Sio	Nash		Omer	A. Williams	Lorck
G. O'Connor	Salesa	Halbert	McLellan	Edmonds	Prime	P. Williams	Craig	Warren-Clark	Lubeck	Wood	Coffey	Allan	Chen	Strange	Leavasa	Sosene	Peke-Mason
													White	Roberts	Rosewarne	Pallett	Henderson

== Committees ==
The 53rd Parliament had 12 select committees and 8 specialist committees. They are listed below, with their chairpersons and deputy chairpersons:

Committee	Chairperson	Deputy chairperson	Government–Opposition divide
Select committees
Economic Development, Science and Innovation Committee	Jamie Strange (Labour)	Naisi Chen (Labour)	3–2
Education and Workforce Committee	Marja Lubeck (Labour)	Camilla Belich (Labour)	6–3
Environment Committee	Hon Eugenie Sage (Green Party)	Rachel Brooking (Labour)	6–3
Finance and Expenditure Committee	Barbara Edmonds (Labour)	Ingrid Leary (Labour)	7–4
Foreign Affairs, Defence and Trade Committee	Hon Jenny Salesa (Labour)	Hon Gerry Brownlee (National)	4–2
Governance and Administration Committee	Ian McKelvie (National)	Rachel Boyack (Labour)	3–2
Health Committee	Tangi Utikere (Labour)	Tracey McLellan (Labour)	6–4
Justice Committee	Ginny Andersen (Labour)	Vanushi Walters (Labour)	5–4
Māori Affairs Committee	Tāmati Coffey (Labour)	Arena Williams (Labour)	5–3
Primary Production Committee	Jo Luxton (Labour)	Steph Lewis (Labour)	4–4
Social Services and Community Committee	Angie Warren-Clark (Labour)	Emily Henderson (Labour)	6–3
Transport and Infrastructure Committee	Shanan Halbert (Labour)	Hon Julie Anne Genter (Green Party)	6–3
Specialist committees
Business Committee	Rt Hon Adrian Rurawhe (Labour)	none	6–5
Intelligence and Security Committee	Rt Hon Chris Hipkins (Labour)	none	4–3
Officers of Parliament Committee	Rt Hon Adrian Rurawhe (Labour)	none	4–4
Pae Ora Legislation Committee	Deborah Russell (Labour)	Tāmati Coffey (Labour)	7–4
Petitions Committee	Hon Jacqui Dean (National)	Shanan Halbert (Labour)	4–3
Privileges Committee	Hon David Parker (Labour)	Hon Michael Woodhouse (National)	5–3
Regulations Review Committee	Judith Collins (National)	Rachel Brooking (Labour)	4–3
Standing Orders Committee	Rt Hon Adrian Rurawhe (Labour)	Hon Michael Woodhouse (National)	5–5

== Electorates ==
General electorates since 2020, showing the 2020 election results

This section shows the New Zealand electorates as they are currently represented in the 53rd Parliament. Electorates were redrawn after the 2018 census and will remain the same for the 2023 election.

=== General electorates ===
Electorate	Region	MP	Party
Auckland Central	Auckland	Chlöe Swarbrick	Green
Banks Peninsula	Canterbury	Tracey McLellan	Labour
Bay of Plenty	Bay of Plenty	Todd Muller	National
Botany	Auckland	Christopher Luxon	National
Christchurch Central	Canterbury	Duncan Webb	Labour
Christchurch East	Canterbury	Poto Williams	Labour
Coromandel	Waikato	Scott Simpson	National
Dunedin	Otago	David Clark	Labour
East Coast	Gisborne and Bay of Plenty	Kiri Allan	Labour
East Coast Bays	Auckland	Erica Stanford	National
Epsom	Auckland	David Seymour	ACT
Hamilton East	Waikato	Jamie Strange	Labour
Hamilton West	Waikato	Tama Potaka	National
Hutt South	Wellington	Ginny Andersen	Labour
Ilam	Canterbury	Sarah Pallett	Labour
Invercargill	Southland	Penny Simmonds	National
Kaikōura	Marlborough and Canterbury	Stuart Smith	National
Kaipara ki Mahurangi	Auckland	Chris Penk	National
Kelston	Auckland	Carmel Sepuloni	Labour
Mana	Wellington	Barbara Edmonds	Labour
Māngere	Auckland	William Sio	Labour
Manurewa	Auckland	Arena Williams	Labour
Maungakiekie	Auckland	Priyanca Radhakrishnan	Labour
Mt Albert	Auckland	Jacinda Ardern	Labour
Mt Roskill	Auckland	Michael Wood	Labour
Napier	Hawke's Bay	Stuart Nash	Labour
Nelson	Nelson and Tasman	Rachel Boyack	Labour
New Lynn	Auckland	Deborah Russell	Labour
New Plymouth	Taranaki	Glen Bennett	Labour
North Shore	Auckland	Simon Watts	National
Northcote	Auckland	Shanan Halbert	Labour
Northland	Northland	Willow-Jean Prime	Labour
Ōhāriu	Wellington	Greg O'Connor	Labour
Ōtaki	Wellington and Manawatū-Whanganui	Terisa Ngobi	Labour
Pakuranga	Auckland	Simeon Brown	National
Palmerston North	Manawatū-Whanganui	Tangi Utikere	Labour
Panmure-Ōtāhuhu	Auckland	Jenny Salesa	Labour
Papakura	Auckland	Judith Collins	National
Port Waikato	Auckland and Waikato	Andrew Bayly	National
Rangitata	Canterbury	Jo Luxton	Labour
Rangitīkei	Manawatū-Whanganui	Ian McKelvie	National
Remutaka	Wellington	Chris Hipkins	Labour
Rongotai	Wellington and the Chatham Islands	Paul Eagle	Labour
Rotorua	Bay of Plenty	Todd McClay	National
Selwyn	Canterbury	Nicola Grigg	National
Southland	Southland and Otago	Joseph Mooney	National
Taieri	Otago	Ingrid Leary	Labour
Takanini	Auckland	Neru Leavasa	Labour
Tāmaki	Auckland	Simon O'Connor	National
Taranaki-King Country	Taranaki and Waikato	Barbara Kuriger	National
Taupō	Waikato	Louise Upston	National
Tauranga	Bay of Plenty	Sam Uffindell	National
Te Atatū	Auckland	Phil Twyford	Labour
Tukituki	Hawke's Bay	Anna Lorck	Labour
Upper Harbour	Auckland	Vanushi Walters	Labour
Waikato	Waikato	Tim van de Molen	National
Waimakariri	Canterbury	Matt Doocey	National
Wairarapa	Wellington, Manawatū-Whanganui and Hawke's Bay	Kieran McAnulty	Labour
Waitaki	Otago and Canterbury	Jacqui Dean	National
Wellington Central	Wellington	Grant Robertson	Labour
West Coast-Tasman	West Coast and Tasman	Damien O'Connor	Labour
Whanganui	Manawatū-Whanganui and Taranaki	Steph Lewis	Labour
Whangaparāoa	Auckland	Mark Mitchell	National
Whangārei	Northland	Emily Henderson	Labour
Wigram	Canterbury	Megan Woods	Labour

=== Māori electorates ===
Māori Electorates since the 2020 election. Red represent Labour seats, brown represents Māori Party seats.

Electorate	Region	MP	Party
Te Tai Tokerau	Northland and Auckland	Kelvin Davis	Labour
Tāmaki Makaurau	Auckland	Peeni Henare	Labour
Hauraki-Waikato	Auckland and Waikato	Nanaia Mahuta	Labour
Waiariki	Bay of Plenty and Waikato	Rawiri Waititi	Māori
Ikaroa-Rāwhiti	Hawke's Bay, Gisborne, Manawatū-Whanganui and Wellington	Meka Whaitiri	Labour
Te Tai Hauāuru	Taranaki, Waikato, Manawatū-Whanganui and Wellington	Adrian Rurawhe	Labour
Te Tai Tonga	The South Island, Wellington and the Chatham Islands	Rino Tirikatene	Labour

== See also ==
- Opinion polling for the 2020 New Zealand general election
- Politics of New Zealand
