= Chris Baillie (politician) =

New Zealand ACT Party politician

Member of the New Zealand Parliament for ACT party list
- In office 17 October 2020 – 14 October 2023

Personal details
- Born: Christopher John Baillie; 1961 or 1962 (age 64–65)
- Party: ACT

Christopher John Baillie (born 1961 or 1962) is a New Zealand politician. He was a Member of Parliament for ACT New Zealand from 2020 to 2023. He also contested the 2023 and 2026 New Zealand general elections but was unsuccessful.

== Early life and career ==
In a speech to Parliament, Baillie said that he was born to a unionist, Labour-supporting household and he believes his contrasting political views originated from his father's support for marine engineer workers on strike. Baillie said that, at 12 years old, he considered the strike unreasonable.

Baillie worked in the police for 14 years, has owned a pub, and has worked as a special education teacher. While working as a teacher he initiated a discussion group at his school, Nayland College, prompted by what he perceived as "hysteria" about climate change, and the effect of this on student mental health. Some of Baillie's former students have criticised his meetings, where he reportedly spoke out against well-known climate change activists including Alexandria Ocasio-Cortez and Greta Thunberg. In response, Baillie denied he was spreading misinformation and rejected descriptions of himself as a climate change denier.

== Political career ==
New Zealand Parliament
Years	Term	Electorate	List	Party
2020–2023	53rd	List	4	ACT

Baillie joined ACT at the end of 2019. He met the party's leader, David Seymour, in early 2020 and after that meeting decided to run for Parliament at that year's general election.

Baillie ran for the electorate of Nelson. He did not win the electorate, placing fourth with 1320 votes, but ACT won 7.6% of the party vote, which entitled it to ten MPs, including Baillie. After the election, Baillie said he had not expected to become an MP when he submitted his candidacy.

He was ACT's spokesperson for small business, workplace relations and safety, education, and police, as well as a member of parliament's education and workforce select committee. Baillie launched the ACT truancy policy in November 2022, which stated that schools would be required to report attendance data to the Ministry of Education each day or risk losing funding and also proposed an infringement regime for parents of nonattendant children.

Baillie unsuccessfully contested the Nelson electorate for a second time in the 2023 general election, coming fourth place with 2,692 votes. Due to his lower party list ranking of 17, Baillie was not reelected to Parliament.

In the 2025 local elections, Baillie ran to be a Nelson city councillor for the district-wide ward as an independent. He was unsuccessful.

During the 2026 New Zealand general election, Baillie was ranked 46th place on the ACT party list and contested the Nelson electorate. On 7 November, he came fourth placed with 1,360 votes, based on preliminary results. Due to his low ranking, Baillie was not elected to Parliament on the ACT party list.

== Political views ==
In his 2020 candidacy, Baillie spoke out against the Climate Change Response (Zero Carbon) Amendment Act, which had passed without opposition in parliament the previous year. He said he supported "sensible" climate change policy that "incorporates evidence". He said he would vote in support of the End of Life Choice Act 2019 but not the Cannabis Legalisation and Control Bill at the euthanasia referendum and the cannabis referendum held alongside the 2020 election.

As an ACT MP, Baillie supported reducing the effects of red tape on businesses. He expressed concern about the effects on businesses of increases in the minimum wage or number of sick days, and the complexity of the personal grievance process. Baillie supported 90-day employment trials, stating "The 90-day (employment) trials in my particular business worked really well. I work with disadvantaged kids and through my policing, I've worked with people who struggle to get a job, and taking away (90-day trials) was a real disservice and made it even more of a challenge for the most vulnerable people in our society to try and get a job." He is also in favour of charter schools. In 2023 he stated his support for law changes enabling the sale of alcohol on religious holidays such as Easter but does not support the removal of public holidays rooted in Christianity.

== Personal life ==
Baillie plays the trumpet and has been a member of multiple jazz bands. He has also played rugby for over 30 years. Baillie owns The Honest Lawyer restaurant in Nelson.
