= End of Life Choice Act 2019 =

Act of Parliament in New Zealand

New Zealand Parliament
- Citation: 2019 No 67
- Territorial extent: New Zealand
- Passed by: House of Representatives
- Passed: 13 November 2019
- Royal assent: 16 November 2019
- Commenced: 7 November 2021

Legislative history
- Bill title: End of Life Choice Bill
- Bill citation: 269-3
- Introduced by: David Seymour
- Introduced: 8 June 2017
- Committee responsible: Justice Committee
- First reading: 13 December 2017
- Voting summary: 76 voted for; 44 voted against
- Second reading: 26 June 2019
- Voting summary: 70 voted for; 50 voted against
- Third reading: 13 November 2019
- Voting summary: 69 voted for; 51 voted against
- Status: Current legislation

The End of Life Choice Act 2019 is an Act of Parliament in New Zealand that gives people with a terminal illness the option of receiving assisted suicide or euthanasia. (Note: The Ministry of Justice and Ministry of Health confirmed that: "The Bill uses 'assisted dying' to refer to both euthanasia and assisted suicide. Euthanasia refers to a patient being administered a lethal drug by a medical practitioner. Assisted suicide refers to a patient receiving lethal drugs at their request, which they take by themselves.") The act came into force on 7 November 2021, twelve months after the 2020 euthanasia referendum was declared in favour of the legislation.

Political progress towards the act began in 2015, when ACT Party MP David Seymour entered it into the member's bill ballot. The bill passed its first reading in December 2017, its second reading in June 2019, and its third reading in November 2019, with 69 votes in favour and 51 opposed. Changes introduced by New Zealand First before the third reading required that the bill would go to referendum to be introduced into law. A binding referendum was held in conjunction with the 2020 general election on whether the act should come into force, with a majority of voters (65%) in favour.

== Contents of the bill ==
=== Eligibility for assisted dying ===
Anyone may request assisted dying, but a person may receive it only if an attending medical practitioner and an independent medical practitioner confirmed that the person meets all of the following eligibility criteria:

- They must be a citizen or permanent resident of New Zealand.
- They must be aged 18 years or over.
- They must suffer from a terminal illness that is likely to end their life within 6 months.
- They must be in an advanced state of irreversible decline in physical capability.
- They must experience unbearable suffering that cannot be relieved in a manner that they consider tolerable.
- They must be able to make an informed decision about assisted dying. An "informed decision" is defined using the following criteria:
  - They must understand information about assisted dying.
  - They must retain information about assisted dying in order to make the decision.
  - They must use or weigh up information about assisted dying when making their decision.
  - They must communicate their decision in some way.

=== Process of assisted dying ===
A person who wishes to have an assisted death must inform an attending medical practitioner. The medical practitioner must complete a prescribed form after talking to the patient about the prognosis of their illness; the irreversible nature of assisted dying and its impacts; and alternative options for end-of-life care. The doctor needs to encourage the person to discuss their wish with others, but the doctor also needs to tell the person that they don't have to discuss it with anyone.

The attending medical practitioner needs to "do their best to ensure that the person expresses their wish free from pressure from any other person". The doctor must do this by talking with other health practitioners who are in regular contact with the person and with family members approved by the person. If this doctor (or a nurse practitioner) suspects that a person "is not expressing their wish free from pressure from any other person", the process must be stopped.

The person must confirm their request by signing and dating a prescribed form in the presence of this practitioner. The second part of the form may be signed by someone else if the person cannot write for any reason.

Once the form has been completed the attending medical practitioner, and following that an independent medical practitioner, must confirm whether the person meets the eligibility criteria. If one or both medical practitioners are unsure about the person's mental competency, a psychiatrist must confirm whether the person is competent. specialist appointed by the SCENZ Group (Support and Consultation for End of Life in New Zealand Group). If eligible, the person can choose the date and method of administration of the lethal dose of medication. Once the medication has been administered the attending medical practitioner must complete a prescribed form notifying the registrar at the Ministry of Health that an assisted death has occurred. The registrar must then forward the form to a review committee.

=== Comparison with other jurisdictions ===
- The End of Life Choice Act allows assisted suicide and euthanasia, like Canada and Western Australia; US laws allow only self-administration of the lethal dose (assisted suicide). Victoria allows euthanasia only if the person is unable to administer it themselves.
- The person needs to initiate one request, which is confirmed in writing. The nine US assisted suicide laws, based on Oregon's Death With Dignity Act, require three requests: an oral request, a written request and a second oral request.
- No independent witnesses are required when the request is confirmed in writing. In contrast, two witnesses are required in addition to the medical practitioner in Victoria (Australia), Western Australia, Canada, and the nine US assisted suicide laws. California’s law also states that the witnesses cannot be the attending medical practitioner, the consulting medical practitioner or the mental health specialist.
- No witness is required when the attending medical practitioner or nurse practitioner asks the person whether they still wish to receive the dose at that time. In Victoria a witness is required at this point.
- No witness is required when the attending medical practitioner or nurse practitioner provides or administers the lethal dose immediately afterwards. In Victoria a witness is required at this point.
- No cooling-off period is required before the lethal dose is prescribed. Hawaii requires a waiting period of at least 20 days between the first and third request. The other eight US laws require at least 15 days between the first and third request. Victoria and Western Australia require at least nine days. Oregon's law was changed in 2019 to allow the waiting period to be waived if the person is expected to die within this period. In Victoria the waiting period is also waived if the person is expected to die or lose mental competency within this period. In contrast, according to the Ministry of Health and Ministry of Justice the process could take just 4 working days from request to death in a hospital setting in New Zealand. This is in keeping with Canadian legislation, which no longer specifies a waiting period for patients with a reasonably foreseeable death, although patients who qualify but do not have a reasonably foreseeable death have a minimum 90 day period unless they are at imminent risk to lose their ability to consent.
- Only one person, the attending medical practitioner, needs to confirm that the person is making a voluntary request. In Oregon, both doctors need to verify "that the patient is capable, acting voluntarily and has made an informed decision". The other eight US laws have similar requirements.
- While New Zealand citizenship or permanent residence is required, physical residence in New Zealand is not required. The US and Australian assisted dying laws require ordinary (physical) residence in addition to citizenship or permanent residence.
- Coercion by someone other than a medical practitioner is not an offence. Coercion is a punishable offence in Oregon and similar US laws.

== Legislative history ==
=== First Reading ===
Voting at first reading (13 December 2017)
| Party | Voted for | Voted against |
|---|---|---|
| National (56) | 21: Amy Adams; Paula Bennett; Chris Bishop; Jonathan Coleman; Matt Doocey; Andrew Falloon; Nathan Guy; Harete Hipango; Brett Hudson; Nikki Kaye; Matt King; Barbara Kuriger; Mark Mitchell; Jami-Lee Ross; Scott Simpson; Stuart Smith; Erica Stanford; Anne Tolley; Tim van de Molen; Hamish Walker; Jian Yang | 35: Kanwaljit Singh Bakshi; Maggie Barry (Teller); Andrew Bayly; David Bennett; Simon Bridges; Simeon Brown; Gerry Brownlee; David Carter; Judith Collins; Jacqui Dean; Sarah Dowie; Bill English; Christopher Finlayson; Paul Goldsmith; Jo Hayes; Steven Joyce; Tutehounuku (Nuk) Korako; Denise Lee; Melissa Lee; Tim Macindoe; Todd McClay; Ian McKelvie; Todd Muller; Alfred Ngaro; Simon O'Connor; Parmjeet Parmar; Chris Penk; Shane Reti; Alastair Scott; Nick Smith; Louise Upston; Nicky Wagner; Michael Woodhouse; Jonathan Young; Lawrence Yule |
| Labour (46) | 37: Kiri Allan; Ginny Andersen; Jacinda Ardern; Tāmati Coffey; Liz Craig; Clare Curran; Kelvin Davis; Ruth Dyson; Paul Eagle; Kris Faafoi; Peeni Henare; Chris Hipkins; Raymond Huo; Willie Jackson; Iain Lees-Galloway; Andrew Little; Marja Lubeck; Jo Luxton; Nanaia Mahuta; Trevor Mallard; Kieran McAnulty; Stuart Nash; Greg O'Connor; David Parker; Willow-Jean Prime; Priyanca Radhakrishnan; Grant Robertson; Adrian Rurawhe; Deborah Russell; Carmel Sepuloni; Jan Tinetti; Louisa Wall; Angie Warren-Clark; Duncan Webb; Meka Whaitiri; Michael Wood; Megan Woods | 9: David Clark; Anahila Kanongata'a-Suisuiki; Damien O'Connor; Jenny Salesa; William Sio; Jamie Strange; Rino Tirikatene; Phil Twyford; Poto Williams |
| NZ First (9) | 9: Darroch Ball; Shane Jones; Jenny Marcroft; Ron Mark; Tracey Martin; Clayton Mitchell (Teller); Mark Patterson; Winston Peters; Fletcher Tabuteau | — |
| Green (8) | 8: Marama Davidson; Julie Anne Genter; Golriz Ghahraman; Gareth Hughes; Jan Logie; Eugenie Sage; James Shaw; Chlöe Swarbrick | — |
| ACT (1) | 1: David Seymour | — |
| Totals | 76 | 44 |

=== Justice Select Committee ===
Written submissions to the Justice Select Committee on the End of Life Choice Bill were received until midnight on 6 March 2018. The committee reported on the bill on 9 April 2019.

=== Second Reading ===
Voting at second reading (26 June 2019)
| Party | Voted for | Voted against |
|---|---|---|
| National (55) | 18: Amy Adams; Paula Bennett; Chris Bishop; Judith Collins; Matt Doocey; Andrew Falloon; Brett Hudson; Nikki Kaye; Matt King; Barbara Kuriger; Mark Mitchell; Scott Simpson; Stuart Smith; Erica Stanford; Tim van de Molen; Nicola Willis; Jian Yang; Lawrence Yule | 37: Kanwaljit Singh Bakshi; Maggie Barry; Andrew Bayly; David Bennett; Dan Bidois; Simon Bridges; Simeon Brown; Gerry Brownlee; David Carter; Jacqui Dean; Sarah Dowie; Paulo Garcia; Paul Goldsmith; Nathan Guy; Jo Hayes; Harete Hipango; Denise Lee; Melissa Lee; Agnes Loheni; Tim Macindoe; Todd McClay; Ian McKelvie; Todd Muller; Alfred Ngaro; Simon O'Connor; Parmjeet Parmar; Chris Penk; Maureen Pugh; Shane Reti; Alastair Scott; Nick Smith; Anne Tolley; Louise Upston; Nicky Wagner; Hamish Walker; Michael Woodhouse; Jonathan Young |
| Labour (46) | 33: Ginny Andersen; Jacinda Ardern; Tāmati Coffey; Liz Craig; Clare Curran; Kelvin Davis; Ruth Dyson; Paul Eagle; Kris Faafoi; Peeni Henare; Chris Hipkins; Raymond Huo; Willie Jackson; Iain Lees-Galloway; Andrew Little; Marja Lubeck; Jo Luxton; Nanaia Mahuta; Trevor Mallard; Kieran McAnulty; Stuart Nash; Greg O'Connor; David Parker; Willow-Jean Prime; Priyanca Radhakrishnan; Grant Robertson; Carmel Sepuloni; Jan Tinetti; Louisa Wall; Angie Warren-Clark; Duncan Webb; Poto Williams; Megan Woods | 13: Kiri Allan; David Clark; Anahila Kanongata'a-Suisuiki; Damien O'Connor; Adrian Rurawhe; Deborah Russell; Jenny Salesa; William Sio; Jamie Strange; Rino Tirikatene; Phil Twyford; Meka Whaitiri; Michael Wood |
| NZ First (9) | 9: Darroch Ball; Shane Jones; Jenny Marcroft; Ron Mark; Tracey Martin; Clayton Mitchell; Mark Patterson; Winston Peters; Fletcher Tabuteau | — |
| Green (8) | 8: Marama Davidson; Julie Anne Genter; Golriz Ghahraman; Gareth Hughes; Jan Logie; Eugenie Sage; James Shaw; Chlöe Swarbrick | — |
| ACT (1) | 1: David Seymour | — |
| Independent (1) | 1: Jami-Lee Ross | — |
| Totals | 70 | 50 |

12 MPs changed positions between the first and second readings. From Labour, Allan, Russell, Rurawhe, Whaitiri and Wood changed from voting for to voting against, while Williams voted for having previously opposed the bill. From National, Guy, Hipango, Tolley and Walker changed from for to against, while Collins and Yule decided to reverse their opposition. Five National MPs had entered Parliament since the first reading but had no net effect on the result- Willis (for) replaced Joyce (against) which was cancelled out by Bidois (against) replacing Coleman (for).

=== Committee of the Whole House ===
The Committee of the Whole House started on 31 July 2019. An amendment by David Seymour that limited eligibility to only those with a terminal illness was agreed to. Other amendments put forward by opponents of the bill were rejected.

The End of Life Choice Bill was debated again on 21 August 2019. Parliament voted to accept Seymour's second round of amendments by a vote of 69 to 51. Key amendments include prohibiting a health practitioner from initiating any discussion about assisted dying, giving employment protections for any doctor, nurse, or psychiatrist who objects to taking part in the process on any ground, and a provision for doctors and nurses to stop the process if they suspect any pressure is being applied on the person seeking assisted dying. The amendments by MPs opposed to the bill including National MPs Maggie Barry, Paulo Garcia, Simeon Brown, and Chris Penk were defeated during the debate. Penk's proposal to have tighter provisions against coercion including getting a "sign-off" from a specialist panel was defeated by 71 to 49 votes. MPs also voted 70 to 50 in favour of the End of Life Choice Bill being given a third and final reading later.

==== Proposed referendum ====
On 23 October 2019, Parliament voted by a margin of 63 to 57 to amend the End of Life Choice Bill to include a binding referendum on whether the End of Life Choice Act 2019 should come into force. New Zealand First MP Jenny Marcroft proposed an amendment to include a referendum on the grounds that euthanasia "directly affected the fabric of society" and that "temporarily empowered politicians... alone should not decide on the bill." In response, Labour MP Louisa Wall criticised NZ First for placing MPs who supported the bill but opposed the referendum in an "untenable position". She also accused NZ First of using the proposed referendum as a bargaining chip for securing the party's support for the third reading of the End of Life Choice Bill scheduled for November 2019.

Parliamentary vote on Jenny Marcroft's amendment for a referendum on the End of Life Choice Bill
| Party | Voted for | Voted against |
|---|---|---|
| National (55) | 16: Amy Adams (teller); David Bennett; Paula Bennett; Chris Bishop; Judith Collins; Matt Doocey; Andrew Falloon; Nikki Kaye; Matt King; Barbara Kuriger; Mark Mitchell; Scott Simpson; Erica Stanford; Jian Yang; Lawrence Yule | 39: Kanwaljit Singh Bakshi; Maggie Barry; Andrew Bayly; Dan Bidois; Simon Bridges; Simeon Brown; Gerry Brownlee; David Carter; Jacqui Dean; Sarah Dowie; Paulo Garcia; Paul Goldsmith; Nathan Guy; Brett Hudson; Jo Hayes; Harete Hipango; Denise Lee; Melissa Lee; Agnes Loheni; Tim Macindoe; Todd McClay; Ian McKelvie; Todd Muller; Alfred Ngaro; Simon O'Connor; Parmjeet Parmar; Chris Penk; Maureen Pugh; Shane Reti; Alastair Scott; Nick Smith; Stuart Smith; Anne Tolley; Louise Upston; Tim van de Molen; Nicky Wagner; Hamish Walker; Nicola Willis; Michael Woodhouse; Jonathan Young |
| Labour (46) | 29: Kiri Allan; Ginny Andersen; Jacinda Ardern; Liz Craig; Clare Curran; Kelvin Davis; Ruth Dyson; Paul Eagle; Kris Faafoi; Peeni Henare; Chris Hipkins; Raymond Huo; Iain Lees-Galloway; Andrew Little; Marja Lubeck; Jo Luxton; Kieran McAnulty; Stuart Nash; Greg O'Connor; David Parker; Willow-Jean Prime; Priyanca Radhakrishnan; Grant Robertson; Deborah Russell; Carmel Sepuloni; Jan Tinetti; Angie Warren-Clark; Duncan Webb; Megan Woods | 17: David Clark; Tāmati Coffey; Willie Jackson; Anahila Kanongata'a-Suisuiki; Nanaia Mahuta; Trevor Mallard; Damien O'Connor; Adrian Rurawhe; Jenny Salesa; William Sio; Jamie Strange; Rino Tirikatene; Phil Twyford; Louisa Wall; Meka Whaitiri; Poto Williams; Michael Wood |
| NZ First (9) | 9: Darroch Ball; Shane Jones; Jenny Marcroft; Ron Mark; Tracey Martin; Clayton Mitchell; Mark Patterson; Winston Peters; Fletcher Tabuteau | — |
| Green (8) | 8: Marama Davidson; Julie Anne Genter; Golriz Ghahraman; Gareth Hughes; Jan Logie; Eugenie Sage; James Shaw; Chlöe Swarbrick | — |
| ACT (1) | 1: David Seymour | — |
| Independent (1) | 1: Jami-Lee Ross | — |
| Totals | 63 | 57 |

=== Third Reading ===
On 13 November 2019, the End of Life Choice Bill passed its third reading 69 votes in favour and 51 votes opposed. The bill was prepared for royal assent. The End of Life Choice Bill was also amended to only allow a person with "a terminal illness that is likely to end the person's life within six months" to request euthanasia. While Seymour disagreed with the change, he supported the amendment in order to maintain the support of the Green Party and several other MPs for a third reading.

In return for New Zealand First's support of the bill through its third reading, the bill would be decided by the public in a binding referendum at the 2020 New Zealand general election.

Voting at third reading (13 November 2019)
| Party | Voted for | Voted against |
|---|---|---|
| National (55) | 17: Amy Adams; Paula Bennett; Chris Bishop; Judith Collins; Matt Doocey; Andrew Falloon; Brett Hudson; Nikki Kaye; Matt King; Barbara Kuriger; Mark Mitchell; Scott Simpson; Stuart Smith; Erica Stanford; Tim van de Molen; Nicola Willis; Jian Yang | 38: Kanwaljit Singh Bakshi; Maggie Barry (teller); Andrew Bayly; David Bennett; Dan Bidois; Simon Bridges; Simeon Brown; Gerry Brownlee; David Carter; Jacqui Dean; Sarah Dowie; Paulo Garcia; Paul Goldsmith; Nathan Guy; Jo Hayes; Harete Hipango; Denise Lee; Melissa Lee; Agnes Loheni; Tim Macindoe; Todd McClay; Ian McKelvie; Todd Muller; Alfred Ngaro; Simon O'Connor; Parmjeet Parmar; Chris Penk; Maureen Pugh; Shane Reti; Alastair Scott; Nick Smith; Anne Tolley; Louise Upston; Nicky Wagner; Hamish Walker; Michael Woodhouse; Jonathan Young; Lawrence Yule |
| Labour (46) | 33: Kiri Allan; Ginny Andersen; Jacinda Ardern; Tāmati Coffey; Liz Craig; Clare Curran; Kelvin Davis; Ruth Dyson; Paul Eagle; Kris Faafoi; Peeni Henare; Chris Hipkins; Raymond Huo; Willie Jackson; Iain Lees-Galloway; Andrew Little; Marja Lubeck; Jo Luxton; Nanaia Mahuta; Trevor Mallard; Kieran McAnulty; Stuart Nash; Greg O'Connor; David Parker; Willow-Jean Prime; Priyanca Radhakrishnan; Grant Robertson; Carmel Sepuloni; Jan Tinetti (teller); Louisa Wall; Angie Warren-Clark; Duncan Webb; Megan Woods | 13: David Clark; Anahila Kanongata'a-Suisuiki; Damien O'Connor; Adrian Rurawhe; Deborah Russell; Jenny Salesa; William Sio; Jamie Strange; Rino Tirikatene; Phil Twyford; Meka Whaitiri; Poto Williams; Michael Wood |
| NZ First (9) | 9: Darroch Ball; Shane Jones; Jenny Marcroft; Ron Mark; Tracey Martin; Clayton Mitchell; Mark Patterson; Winston Peters; Fletcher Tabuteau | — |
| Green (8) | 8: Marama Davidson; Julie Anne Genter; Golriz Ghahraman; Gareth Hughes; Jan Logie; Eugenie Sage; James Shaw; Chlöe Swarbrick | — |
| ACT (1) | 1: David Seymour | — |
| Independent (1) | 1: Jami-Lee Ross | — |
| Totals | 69 | 51 |

=== 2020 Euthanasia referendum ===
A binding referendum on euthanasia was held alongside the 2020 New Zealand general election and the 2020 New Zealand cannabis referendum on 17 October 2020. Preliminary results for the two referendums were released by the Electoral Commission on 30 October. These preliminary results found 65.2% of people in support of the End of Life Choice Act with 33.8% opposed.

Following the counting of the 480,000 special votes, official results for the general election and referendums were released on 6 November. Based on the final results, 65.1% of people supported the legislation while 33.7% opposed it.

== See also ==
- Euthanasia in New Zealand
- Legality of euthanasia
