= Mark Cameron (politician) =

New Zealand politician

Mark Cameron MP

Member of the New Zealand Parliament for ACT party list
- In office 17 October 2020 – 7 November 2026

Personal details
- Born: 1972 or 1973 (age 53–54)
- Party: ACT
- Children: 3
- Profession: Farmer

Mark Stuart Cameron is a New Zealand politician and dairy farmer. He has been a member of Parliament for ACT New Zealand since the 2020 general election.

== Personal life ==
Mark Cameron is a dairy farmer from Ruawai in Northland. Cameron has lived and farmed in the Northland region for 30 years.

Cameron is married and has had three children. In May 2024, Cameron's 22-year-old son died suddenly, prompting condolences from politicians including prime minister Christopher Luxon. Cameron has spoken about suffering from depression and kidney disease.

== Political career ==
New Zealand Parliament
Years	Term	Electorate	List	Party
2020–2023	53rd	List	8	ACT
2023–2026	54th	List	7	ACT

=== First term, 2020–2023 ===
In the 2020 New Zealand General Election, Cameron ran for the electorate of Northland, coming in at fourth place via the ACT Party list. In his first term, he was ACT Party spokesman for primary industries, regional economic development and biosecurity.

Cameron is a prominent spokesman for issues in rural communities such as farming regulations and mental health. Cameron has been critical of several climate change measures taken by the New Zealand government, stating that some scientists and politicians are "perpetuating an environment of fear" against rural farmers. Cameron advocates for more regional solutions to tackle environmental issues, rather than top-down government policy. Cameron was an advocate of the End of Life Choice Act 2019.

During parliamentary question time on 18 November 2021, Cameron asked Minister for Rural Communities Damien O'Connor, who was absent and was represented by his colleague Stuart Nash, if he had met the leaders of farming advocacy group Groundswell NZ. In response, Nash alleged that the group promoted racism and vaccine hesitancy. When Cameron reiterated his question, Nash told Cameron to avoid posing with someone holding an anti-vaccination sign at a Groundswell protest. Nash's remarks were criticised as slanderous by Groundswell NZ leader Bryce McKenzie, who emphasized the group's efforts to combat racism and anti-vaccination sentiment among its members and social media platforms. A few days after the exchange with Nash, Newshub reported that in 2019 Cameron had made online comments referring to Jacinda Ardern as a "feckless wench" and "vacuous teenager", and endorsing the repurposing of the MAGA acronym to stand for "Make Ardern go away." He had also described Donald Trump as "making his country awesome". When asked about the comments, Cameron expressed regret for what he described as "flippant remarks", made while he was "a civilian, not a parliamentarian".

=== Second term, 2023–2026 ===
Cameron contested Northland at the 2023 general election. He placed sixth in the electorate but was returned for a second term as a list MP.

In mid July 2024, Cameron introduced a member's bill aimed at preventing local councils from including the impact of climate change in resource consenting decisions, arguing that such measures hurt economic productivity. Cameron was critical of the Gisborne District Council's climate change roadmap to 2050, arguing it would have little impact on reducing climate change globally. This bill was supported by farming advocacy group Federated Farmers.

In early June 2026, Cameron confirmed that he would not be contesting the 2026 New Zealand general election due to health issues stemming from kidney failure and the emotional toll from the death of his son in 2024. While Cameron had intended to return to Parliament in March or April 2026, he had suffered a heart attack in December 2025, making him ineligible for the kidney donor list.

While Cameron did not stand as an ACT list candidate during the 1026 general election, he contested the Northland electorate and came fifth place with 2,058 votes based on preliminary results. He was not re-elected to Parliament.
