= Brooke van Velden =

New Zealand politician (born 1992)

The Honourable Brooke van Velden MP
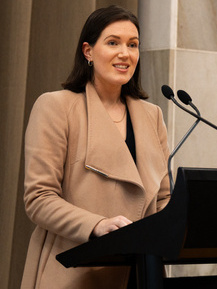
- Van Velden in 2024

38th Minister of Internal Affairs
- Incumbent
- Assumed office 27 November 2023
- Prime Minister: Christopher Luxon
- Preceded by: Barbara Edmonds

6th Minister for Workplace Relations and Safety
- Incumbent
- Assumed office 27 November 2023
- Prime Minister: Christopher Luxon
- Preceded by: Carmel Sepuloni

Deputy Leader of ACT New Zealand
- In office 28 June 2020 – 28 June 2026
- Leader: David Seymour
- Preceded by: Beth Houlbrooke
- Succeeded by: Nicole McKee

Member of the New Zealand Parliament for Tāmaki
- Incumbent
- Assumed office 14 October 2023
- Preceded by: Simon O'Connor
- Majority: 4,575

Member of the New Zealand Parliament for ACT Party List
- In office 17 October 2020 – 14 October 2023

Personal details
- Born: 15 October 1992 (age 34) Auckland, New Zealand
- Party: ACT
- Education: University of Auckland

Brooke Olivia van Velden (born 15 October 1992) is a New Zealand politician who served as the deputy leader of ACT New Zealand from June 2020 to June 2026. She has been a member of Parliament (MP) since the 2020 general election, first as a list MP and, since 2023, the MP for Tāmaki. Van Velden currently serves in the National-led government as the 38th minister of internal affairs and 6th minister for workplace relations and safety. She is the second youngest cabinet minister in New Zealand history, being just eight days older than Phil Goff was when he became Minister of Housing after the 1984 election.

Van Velden has announced she will retire from politics at the 2026 general election.

== Early life and career ==
Van Velden was born in Auckland in 1992. She attended St Cuthbert's College in Auckland, where she joined the school choir in Year 12. She says this sparked her interest in public speaking. She later joined the Welsh Choir.

Van Velden studied economics and international trade at the University of Auckland, graduating with a Bachelor of Arts and Bachelor of Commerce in 2016. She worked for lobbying firm Exceltium.

== Early political career ==
=== Political staffer and lobbyist ===
Before becoming a Member of Parliament, van Velden worked as a staffer for ACT leader David Seymour. Her sole task in this role was to get Seymour's End of Life Choice Bill passed. She spent two years lobbying Members of Parliament to support it and helped draft the legislation. Van Velden said that she "made herself useful" to MPs who wanted to know more about the bill, and also approached politicians in the tunnel between the Beehive and the Bowen Street building to discuss the bill. She said that she has been called a "snake" and a "spy", and that once several MPs had shouted abuse at her.

The Bill passed and became an Act of Parliament in 2019, but with concessions. The bill faced opposition from members of the Justice Select Committee in 2018. Seymour and van Velden developed a "sponsor's report" for the bill, giving their own recommendations before the committee, including limiting assisted death only to those who were terminally ill. This compromise restricted choice but improved support. The Act also states that it only comes into effect if supported by a referendum. This referendum was held on 17 October and it passed with 65.1% support.

=== 2017 election candidacy ===
Van Velden first ran for Parliament at the 2017 general election. She contested the Auckland Central electorate and was placed third on ACT's party list, but was not elected.

== First term, 2020–2023 ==
New Zealand Parliament
Years	Term	Electorate	List	Party
2020–2023	53rd	List	2	ACT
2023–2026	54th	Tāmaki	2	ACT

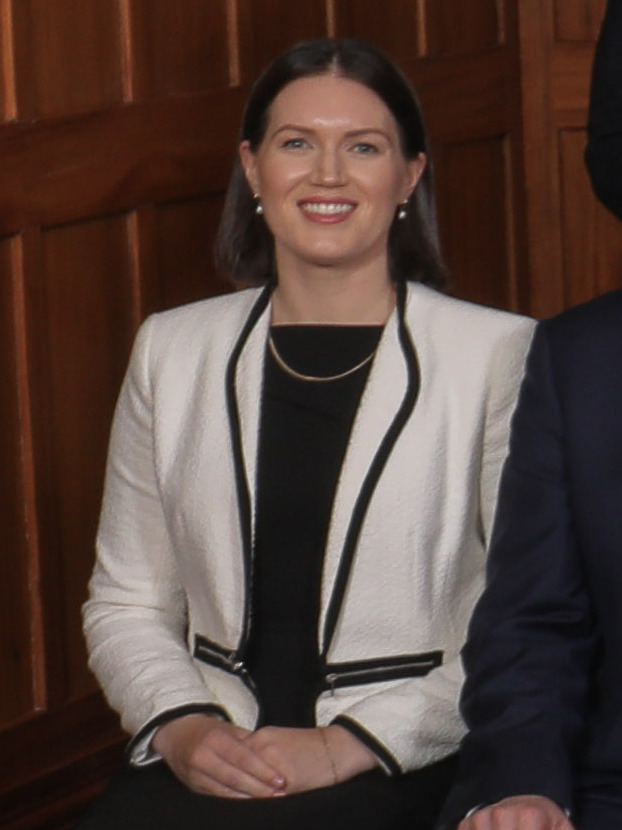
Brooke van Velden during the formation of the Sixth National Government in November 2023.

Van Velden was selected as ACT's deputy leader in June 2020, at the age of 27, and was placed second on its party list for the 2020 general election. At the announcement of her role, leader David Seymour described her as the "future of the party". She ran for the electorate of Wellington Central. She did not win the electorate, placing fifth with 865 votes, but ACT, with 7.6% of the preliminary party vote, was entitled to ten MPs including van Velden. As Seymour was previously the party's only representative in Parliament, van Velden became one of nine new ACT Party MPs in the 53rd Parliament. In addition to being deputy leader, she is the ACT party whip and spokesperson for Health, Housing, Foreign Affairs, and Trade.

=== Foreign affairs ===
In late April 2021, van Velden submitted a motion asking the New Zealand Parliament to debate and vote on the issue of human rights abuses against the Uyghur ethnic minority community in China's Xinjiang province. In early May, the incumbent Labour Party revised the motion to raise concerns about human rights abuses in Xinjiang while deleting the term genocide, which was subsequently adopted by the New Zealand Parliament on 5 May. In response, the Chinese Embassy claimed that the motion was based on "groundless accusations" of human rights abuses against China and interfered in China's internal affairs.

On 19 May 2021, van Velden on behalf of her party opposed Green Party MP Golriz Ghahraman's motion calling for Members of Parliament to recognise the rights of Palestinians to self-determination and statehood while reaffirming the Act Party's support for a two-state solution to the Israel-Palestine conflict. Van Velden justified ACT's opposition on the basis of another Green MP Ricardo Menéndez March's tweet that said "From the river to the sea, Palestine will be free!" In response, Ghahraman contended that March was defending the rights of both Arabs and Jews to having equal rights in their homeland.

=== Member's bill ===
Van Velden's member's bill, the Housing Infrastructure (GST-sharing) Bill, was selected for first reading in October 2022. If passed, it would require the Government to share half of the GST revenue of a new house with the territorial authority responsible for the district the house is built in.

=== 2023 general election ===
Ahead of the 2023 New Zealand general election, van Velden was selected as the ACT party candidate for the eastern Auckland electorate of Tāmaki, which had been held by the National Party since 1960. Van Velden announced she would campaign to win the electorate, instead of campaigning for the party vote only, something the party rarely does outside of their stronghold of Epsom. An opinion poll released on 2 October showed van Velden tied with the incumbent, Simon O'Connor. The election night results showed a victory for van Velden, with a majority of 4,158 votes.

== Second term, 2023–present ==
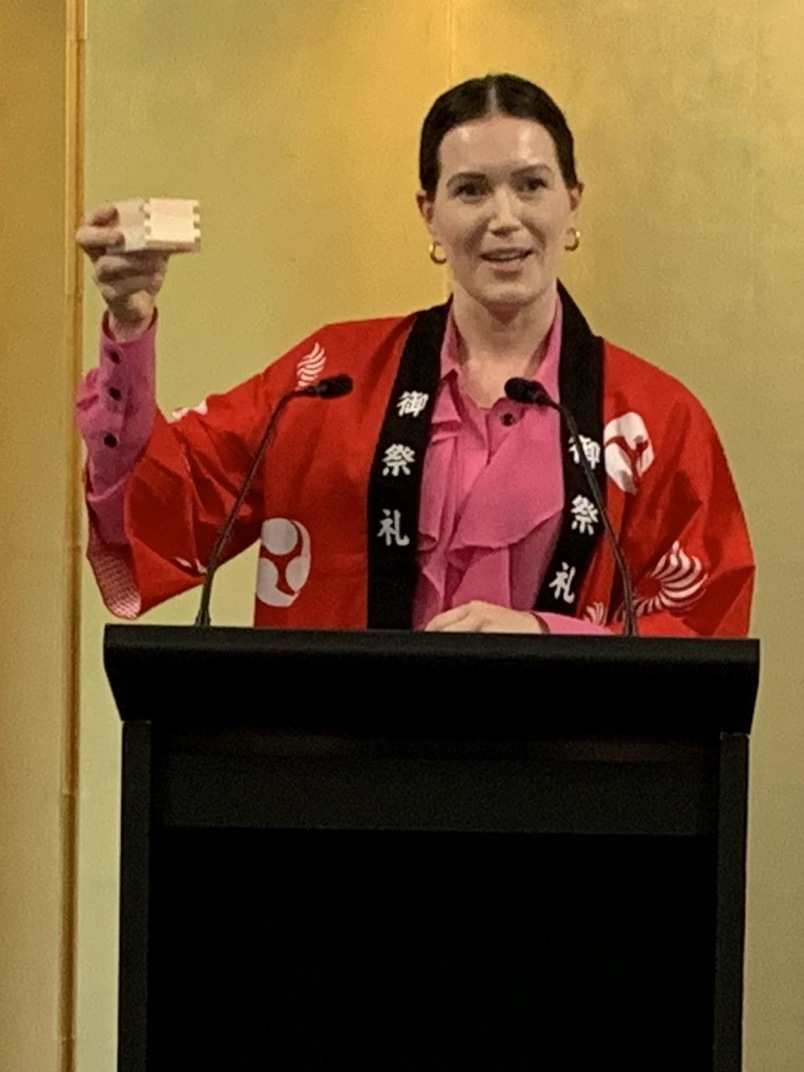
Van Velden at a celebration of the Japanese Emperor's birthday in 2025

Following the formation of the National-led coalition government, van Velden became Minister of Internal Affairs and Minister of Workplace Relations and Safety.

=== Remuneration policies ===
As Workplace Relations Minister, she introduced legislation repealing the previous Labour Government's Fair Pay Agreements Act 2022 on 19 December 2023. Van Velden claimed that fair pay agreements "were never about fairness" but forced "a minority of union worker's views on all affected workers and businesses."

On 1 February 2024, van Velden, as Workplace Relations and Safety Minister, confirmed that the Government would raise the minimum wage by two percent to NZ$23.15 an hour from 1 April 2024. On 2 February Van Velden, as Minister of Internal Affairs, confirmed that the Government would expand the scope of the Royal Commission of Inquiry into COVID-19 Lessons Learned to include the use of multiple lockdowns, vaccine procurement, the socio-economic impacts of the COVID-19 pandemic on regional and national levels, the cost-effectiveness of the Government's policies, disruptions to public health, education and businesses caused by the Government's policies, and whether the Government response was consistent with the rule of law.

=== Holiday Act changes ===
In March 2024, van Velden confirmed that the Government was planning to overhaul health and safety regulations and amend the Holiday Act 2003. She criticised the previous Labour Government's minimum wage increase, designation of Matariki as a public holiday and doubling of sick leave entitlements for creating business uncertainty and raising the costs of doing business. While Business NZ welcomed the proposed changes, First Union New Zealand described the proposed changes as an attack on workers. In early June 2024, van Velden confirmed that an exposure draft of the Government's proposed changes to the Holidays Act would be released in September 2024 including shifting annual leave from an entitlement system to an accrual system. She later confirmed that she and officials were working to develop a system of pro-rated sick leave but ruled out reducing sick leave from ten to five days.

In September 2025, van Velden confirmed that the Government would introduce a new hours-based sick and holiday leave accrual system for part-time employees and contractors as part of its reform of the Holiday Act.

=== Equal Pay Amendment Act 2025 ===
On 6 May 2025, van Velden announced that the Government would raise the threshold for making pay equity claims, stating that a 2020 law change had "created problems." As a result, van Velden confirmed that 33 pay equity claims had been stopped. The Public Service Association's national secretary Fleur Fitzsimons opposed the changes, claiming that they would make it "impossible for people in female-dominated professions to be paid fairly." That same day, the Government introduced urgent legislation to raise the pay equity threshold. The Equal Pay Amendment Act 2025 passed under urgency on 7 May, with the support of the governing coalition parties. Opposition parties opposed the bill.

In early May 2025, the Labour Party's leadership apologised after the Whangaparāoa branch published and deleted a Facebook post depicting van Velden in a Nazi military uniform. The post was made in response to the National-led government's legislation raising pay equity thresholds; which van Velden had sponsored. Van Velden described the post as offensive since her grandfather had experienced the Nazi occupation of the Netherlands. On 14 May, van Velden expressed disagreement during a Parliament debate with Stuff journalist Andrea Vance's op-ed newspaper column criticising her and National MPs Judith Collins, Erica Stanford, Louise Upston and Nicola Grigg for supporting the Government's pay equity legislation, which Vance argued disproportionately affected predominantly female professions. During the debate, van Velden quoted a passage from Vance's column mentioning the word "cunt." New Zealand First leader Winston Peters criticised van Velden for using what he regarded as inappropriate language while ACT leader Seymour defended van Velden's parliamentary conduct. Speaker Gerry Brownlee advised MPs on their use of language in Parliament.

=== Employment Relations Amendment Bill ===
On 17 June 2025, van Velden confirmed the Government would be introducing the Employment Relations Amendment Bill into Parliament. Key provisions include changing the distinction between employment and contracting, overhauling the personal grievance process, and allowing employers and employees to negotiate "beneficial terms and conditions." While BusinessNZ director of advocacy Catherine Beard said the proposed legislation would provide more clarity around contract work, the Public Service Association national secretary Fleur Fitzsimons and the New Zealand Council of Trade Unions president Richard Wagstaff expressed concern that the proposed law changes would undermine workers' rights, pay and safety.

On 17 February 2026, the Employment Relations Amendment Act 2026 passed its third reading. It tightened the criteria for personal grievances claims, created a "gateway test" for differentiating between employees and contractors, ended payouts for employees dismissed for "serious misconduct," and eliminated a 30-day rule extending automatic collective agreement terms to new employees. She argued that the new legislation would "maximise business confidence" and accelerate business growth. By contrast, E tū union national secretary Rachel Mackintosh and Green workplace relations spokesperson Teanau Tuiono criticised the bill for favouring corporations and employers over workers.

=== Road cone tipline ===
In early June 2025, the workplace safety agency WorkSafe New Zealand launched a new road cone online tipline. As Minister for Workplace Relations and Safety, van Velden said that the new tipline reflected a new shift from "strict enforcement" towards collaboration with businesses and individuals. By early June 2025, the hotline had received over 650 reports, with Auckland Transport receiving nearly 200 reports. By late July 2025, WorkSafe had received 217 reports, with the majority occurring in the Auckland, Wellington and Canterbury Regions.

On 19 December 2025, the Government shut down the road cone hotline scheme due to deceasing usage and a low volume of valid complaints. The hotline had received about 1,300 notifications over a six-month period and had cost about NZ$150,000. While Labour transport spokesperson Tangi Utikere described the road cone hotline as a waste of taxpayer money, van Velden argued "that it gave the public a voice, identified the root causes of concern and clarified WorkSafe's role in temporary traffic management."

=== Miscellaneous ===
In July 2025, van Velden introduced the Government's proposed online casino legislation, which would introduce 15 licenses for online casinos operating in New Zealand. The bill passed its first reading on 15 July with the support of the ruling coalition and the opposition Green parties.

On 6 May van Velden, as Minister of Internal Affairs, announced that the Government would introduce a citizenship test focusing on the Bill of Rights, voting rights and government structure for prospective New Zealand citizens from mid-2027.

=== Retirement ===
On 24 March 2026, she announced her retirement from politics and that she wouldn't be running for parliament in the 2026 New Zealand general election. She was replaced as Deputy Leader of ACT by Nicole McKee on 28 June 2026.

== Views and positions ==
Van Velden has stated her reasons for entering politics are to reduce generational debt, improve housing affordability, and provide better mental health for all. She supported the End of Life Choice Bill based on her belief in freedom of choice. In a debate about legalising cannabis, van Velden said that she had smoked it before. She was formerly a Green Party voter but switched to supporting ACT while studying economics and international trade at the University of Auckland.

In 2023, she said "When it came to COVID, we completely blew out what the value of a life was, completely, I’ve never seen such a high value on life."

== Personal life ==
Van Velden's parents, Adele and Robin, were a nurse and mechanic, and later owned car sale firms. She has three older brothers, Joel, Blake and Kent.

On 8 November, 2026, the day after 2026 General election, Van Velden announced the birth of her first child.
