= Angela Roberts (politician) =

New Zealand Labour Party politician

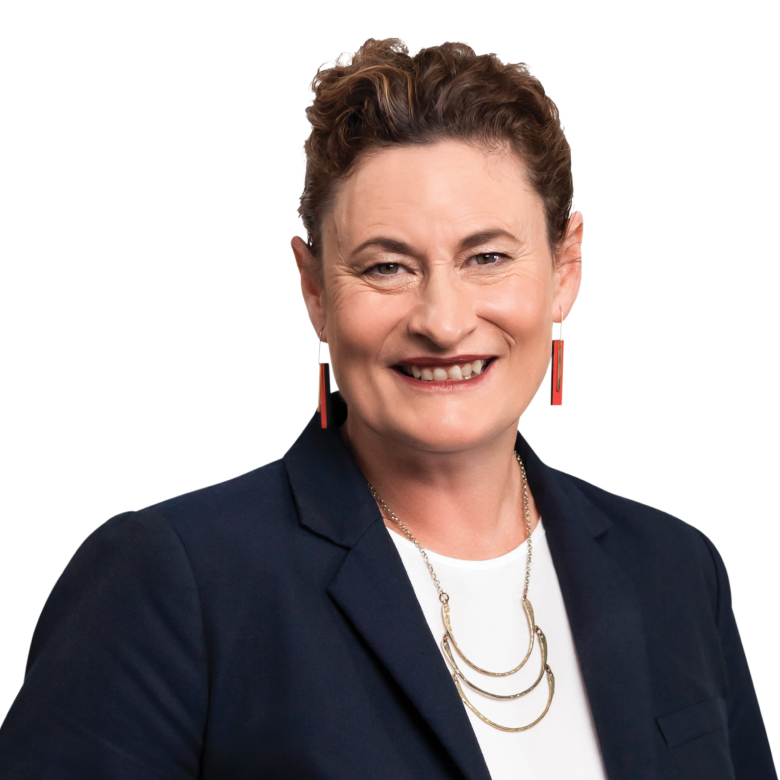
- Roberts in 2023

Member of the New Zealand Parliament for Labour party list
- In office 17 October 2020 – 14 October 2023

Personal details
- Born: 1968 or 1969 (age 56–57)
- Party: Labour
- Children: 2
- Profession: Teacher

Angela Susan Roberts is a New Zealand teacher, unionist and politician.

== Early life and career ==
Roberts spent 20 years in the education sector teaching economics and drama, including at Stratford High School. She was president of the Post Primary Teachers' Association (PPTA) union from 2013 to 2017. In that role, she was critical of then-Minister of Education Hekia Parata on teaching issues including Novopay and charter schools. When she returned to teaching in 2017, she became senior vice president of the PPTA.

Roberts was involved in the Just Transition Summit conversations in Taranaki, following the Sixth Labour Government's 2018 decision to ban new offshore oil and gas exploration permits. She took a particular interest in the role of education and training in sustaining future businesses and workforce.

== Member of Parliament ==
New Zealand Parliament
Years	Term	Electorate	List	Party
2020–2023	53rd	List	50	Labour

There was speculation Roberts would run as a Labour Party candidate in the 2017 election, a notion she did not rule out. However, at the last minute, she decided against running.

=== First term, 2020–2023 ===
Roberts entered Parliament in the 2020 election. She ran for the electorate of Taranaki-King Country, coming second behind the incumbent National MP Barbara Kuriger by a margin of 3,134 votes. The Labour Party performed strongly and Roberts was elected to Parliament as a list MP, ranked 50th on the party list.

Roberts gave her maiden statement on 2 December 2020. She was a member of the education committee from 2 December 2020 until 8 September 2023, a member of the primary production committee from 4 May 2022 to 16 February 2023, and deputy chair of the primary production committee from 16 February to 8 September 2023.

On 29 September 2023, Roberts was physically assaulted at a surgery at the Rotary club in Inglewood, Taranaki, while canvassing for Taranaki-King Country. The man reportedly confronted Roberts before he “grabbed [her] shoulders" and shook her violently "in order to emphasise the point he was making" before slapping her across the face. Roberts later said to Radio New Zealand "It feels like, incrementally, there is a growing acceptance of aggression in politics and our democratic processes. This must change." She thanked National MP Barbara Kuriger for reaching out to her after the incident.

During the 2023 New Zealand general election held on 14 October, Roberts contested Taranaki-King Country a second time. She lost to incumbent Kuriger by a margin of 14,355 votes.

=== 2026 general election ===
During the 2026 New Zealand general election, Roberts contested the Whanganui for Labour. She was ranked 45th on the Labour Party list.

Based on preliminary results, Roberts came second place to the incumbent National candidate Carl Bates, who won by a margin of 6,748 votes. Due to her lower ranking, she did not return to Parliament on the Labour Party list.
