= Damien Smith (politician) =

New Zealand politician

Member of the New Zealand Parliament for ACT party list
- In office 17 October 2020 – 14 October 2023

Personal details
- Born: Damien Francis Smith Northern Ireland
- Citizenship: New Zealander
- Party: ACT

Damien Francis Smith is a former New Zealand politician. He was a Member of Parliament for ACT New Zealand from 2020 until 2023.

== Early life and career ==
Smith was born in Northern Ireland and grew up in Enniskillen during The Troubles. His parents were Frank and Agnes; he is one of four siblings.

His early career was in corporate sales in the fast-moving consumer goods industry, in banking, and in governance and advisory. He came to New Zealand in 2002. He previously worked for Virgin Group and ASB Bank, and runs his own consulting business.

He lives in Auckland and has one daughter.

== Political career ==
New Zealand Parliament
Years	Term	Electorate	List	Party
2020–2023	53rd	List	10	ACT

During the 2020 New Zealand general election, first-time candidate Smith contested the Botany electorate for the ACT Party, where he came third. He had been placed at 11 on the initial ACT Party list but was moved up to 10 after ninth-ranked Stephen Berry withdrew three months before the election. ACT received sufficient support for 10 of its members to be elected to Parliament, including Smith.

Smith was ACT's spokesperson for land information, commerce and consumer affairs, state owned enterprises, revenue, racing, arts, culture and heritage, and sport and recreation, and associate spokesperson for finance. He was also a member of the Finance and Expenditure Committee.

In his maiden speech, Smith described his political views as liberal and centre-right. He called for increased productivity, quoting quoted American economists Paul Krugman (from The Age of Diminished Expectations) and Murray Rothbard. He also called on the government to reduce its spending and debt, and for more houses to be built. In later speeches, he became outspoken on foreign direct investment; he considered increased foreign direct investment would support a more productive and competitive New Zealand economy and, in July 2022, described New Zealand as "like North Korea but without the nukes" in respect of its foreign investment laws.

Smith proposed legislation to exempt investors from OECD countries from the need to receive Overseas Investment Office approval to invest in New Zealand, except in respect of investments in residential land. The Overseas Investment (Exempt Investment from OECD Countries) Amendment Bill, a private member's bill in Smith's name, was introduced into Parliament in August 2021. Its first reading failed 43–77 on 21 September 2023.

Smith did not stand for re-election in the 2023 election. He did not give a reason for not seeking to stand again. His expected valedictory statement was cancelled due to illness and his final parliamentary speech was in opposition to the government's Fair News Digital Bargaining Bill. In that final speech, he defined his political views as "anarcho-capitalist" and promoted self-regulation of the media industry in a free market.
