= Ibrahim Omer =

New Zealand Labour Party politician

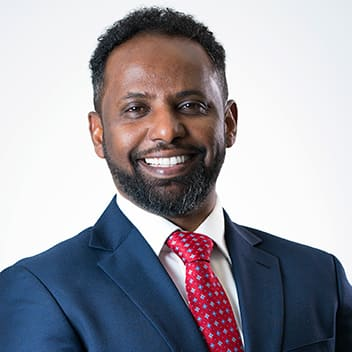

Member of the New Zealand Parliament for Labour party list
- In office 17 October 2020 – 14 October 2023

Personal details
- Born: 1979 or 1980 (age 45–46) Ethiopia
- Party: Labour
- Education: Victoria University of Wellington (BA)
- Profession: Politician

Ibrahim Omer (born 1979/1980) is a New Zealand politician. He was a Member of Parliament for the Labour Party from 2020 to 2023. He contested the 2023 and 2026 New Zealand general elections but was unsuccessful.

== Early life ==
Omer is a refugee from Eritrea. His mother language is Saho and he is a Muslim. He fled his home as a teenager to Sudan, where the United Nations High Commissioner for Refugees became involved and referred his case on to third countries for resettlement.

While in United Nations-run refugee camps in Sudan, Omer worked as an interpreter. This work led to suspicions of spying, and he was retained by authorities until the United Nations intervened.

== Education and organising career ==
He arrived in New Zealand in 2008, through New Zealand's refugee quota. Omer says that his time in New Zealand began with cleaning and scrubbing floors; this period included working as a cleaner at Victoria University of Wellington where he would study and earn a Bachelor of Arts in political science in 2016. Omer described working until 4am cleaning the university, then attending a lecture at 10am in a room that he had cleaned the night before.

Omer has worked as a union organiser for E tū, and as a community advocate, including as chairperson of ChangeMakers Resettlement Forum. For this work he was awarded an Absolutely Positively Wellingtonian Award by the Wellington City Council in 2019. Omer was also involved in advocating for a living wage, especially for cleaners at Victoria University of Wellington.

== Member of Parliament ==
New Zealand Parliament
Years	Term	Electorate	List	Party
2020–2023	53rd	List	42	Labour

Omer entered Parliament in the 2020 election. He was placed 42nd on the Labour Party's party list, and Labour won enough seats to allow him to enter Parliament with that ranking.

Omer is New Zealand's first MP from Africa, and the second MP to have entered New Zealand as a refugee, after Golriz Ghahraman.Following Jacinda Ardern's resignation as prime minister in 2023, Omer said that "Throughout the past five and a half years, she has led with decisiveness, empathy and kindness".

Omer's private member's bill, the Crimes (Theft By Employer) Amendment Bill, was selected for introduction in April 2023 and read a first time. The bill intended to clarify that an employer withholding an employees' wages is theft. In March 2025, under the stewardship of Camilla Belich and with the support of Labour, the Green Party, Te Pāti Māori (all in Opposition) and New Zealand First (part of the Government), the bill completed its third reading.

In February 2023, Omer was one of four candidates vying for the Labour nomination in Wellington Central for the 2023 election after Grant Robertson decided to stand only on the party list. He was successful in his bid and contested the electorate for Labour at the general election. During the election campaign, Omer claimed that Labour had not abandoned its policy of introducing a capital gains tax. This was rebuffed by Labour leader Chris Hipkins, who confirmed that Labour would not be introducing a capital gains tax if re-elected into government. In the October 2023 election, Omer was defeated in his electorate by Tamatha Paul by a margin of 6,066 votes and did not return to Parliament.

During the 2026 New Zealand general election, Omer was ranked 30th on the Labour Party list. Based on preliminary results, he did not enter Parliament through the party list.

== Political views ==
Omer expressed a desire to focus on racism, unequal opportunities, and issues facing low-paid workers during his time in Parliament.

In December 2020, Omer joined Green Party MPs Golriz Ghahraman and Teanau Tuiono in pledging to form a new parliamentary Palestine friendship group to "raise the voices of Palestinian peoples in the New Zealand Parliament" during an event organised by the Wellington Palestine advocacy group to mark the International Day of Solidarity with the Palestinian people.
