= Marja Lubeck =

New Zealand politician

Marja Lubeck MP
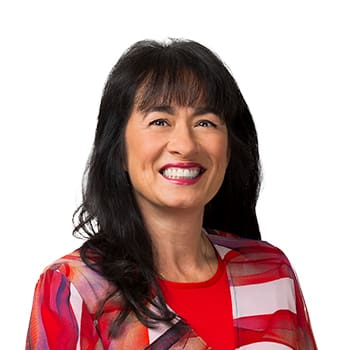

Member of the New Zealand Parliament for Labour party list
- In office 23 September 2017 – 14 October 2023

Personal details
- Born: 1965 (age 60–61)
- Party: Labour
- Profession: Former Member of Parliament. Former Flight attendant and unionist

Maria Josina Elisabeth "Marja" Lubeck (born 1965) is a New Zealand politician. She was a member of parliament in the House of Representatives for the Labour Party.

== Early life and family ==
Lubeck was born in the Netherlands, the eldest child of Valentin "Tijn" and Nel Lubeck. Her father's family were Chinese–Indonesian; they moved to the Netherlands after being imprisoned in Japanese internment camps during World War II. She immigrated from the Netherlands to New Zealand in 1989, and became an international flight attendant for Air New Zealand in 1996. She joined the Flight Attendant and Related Services Association (FARSA) as a delegate and was elected as president of FARSA in 2009, serving four terms. She graduated with a law degree in 2014 after studying part-time as a foundation student of the Auckland University of Technology Law School. In February 2017, Lubeck was admitted to the bar as barrister and solicitor of the High Court.

During her time as president of FARSA she was involved in an operational merger arrangement with New Zealand's largest private sector union, E tū, resulting in the FARSA membership endorsing an amalgamation in November 2016. Lubeck served as the lead advocate in negotiations for the major airlines servicing the New Zealand market and was part of the High Performance Engagement (HPE) Leadership Team at Air New Zealand where organised labour and management engage in a consensus-based workplace democracy programme.

== Political career ==
New Zealand Parliament
Years	Term	Electorate	List	Party
2017–2020	52nd	List	32	Labour
2020–2023	53rd	List	34	Labour

Lubeck stood for Labour in the Rodney electorate in the 2017 election and was placed 32 on Labour's party list. Lubeck placed second in the electorate behind incumbent Mark Mitchell, but was elected as a list MP. In her first term, Lubeck was appointed to the education and workforce committee and the transport and industrial relations committee.

In 2018, Lubeck sponsored a draft member's bill to ban conversion therapy. Lubeck accepted a petition from Young Greens and Young Labour and worked closely with grassroots activist, Shaneel Lal in the movement to end conversion therapy in Aotearoa New Zealand. Lubeck's bill was not selected to be debated in Parliament but a policy to ban conversion therapy was included in Labour's manifesto for the 2020 election. When the party won the election it eventually passed the Conversion Practices Prohibition Legislation Act 2022 which was based on Lubeck's bill.

During the 2020 New Zealand general election, Lubeck contested the new Kaipara ki Mahurangi electorate but was defeated by Chris Penk by a final margin of 4,435 votes. However, Lubeck was re-elected as a list MP. In her second term, she chaired the education and workforce committee.

On 13 December 2022, Lubeck announced that she would not be contesting the 2023 New Zealand general election. In announcing her resignation, Lubeck stated that "it's a tough job... it's a lot of juggling to do." She also attribute her resignation to the health and travel strains associated with her job and a desire to spend more time with her family.
