= Angie Warren-Clark =

New Zealand politician

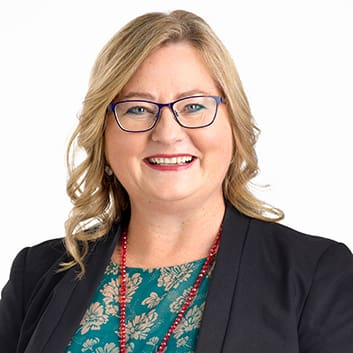

Member of the New Zealand Parliament for Labour party list
- In office 23 September 2017 – 14 October 2023

Personal details
- Born: 1971 (age 54–55)
- Party: Labour
- Spouse: Blair
- Children: 2
- Education: University of Waikato
- Profession: Lawyer

Angela Maree Warren-Clark (born 1971) is a New Zealand politician and former Member of Parliament in the House of Representatives for the Labour Party.

== Professional career ==
Warren-Clark is a non-practicing barrister and solicitor. She has been active in the field of domestic violence since the early 2000s, and was the manager of Women's Refuge in Tauranga prior to her election. The refuge had to operate on a mere $21 a week fund from Government which she described as "appalling" and had to raise $500,000 every year in fundraising to sustain the refuge.

== Political career ==
Warren-Clark stood for the Labour candidacy in the Tauranga electorate in 2017 but was beaten by Jan Tinetti. Her successful candidacy to represent Labour in the Bay of Plenty electorate was announced in February 2017.

=== Member of Parliament ===
New Zealand Parliament
Years	Term	Electorate	List	Party
2017–2020	52nd	List	39	Labour
2020–2023	53rd	List	35	Labour

During the 2017 election, Warren-Clark stood on the Labour's party list, where she was placed 39th. She also contested the Bay of Plenty electorate but was defeated by National MP Todd Muller by a margin of 13,996 votes. Initially she had not been elected on the provisional results, however Labour gained enough party votes when special votes were counted for Warren-Clark to be allocated a seat.

During the 2020 New Zealand general election, Warren-Clark contested the Bay of Plenty electorate again, standing against incumbent Todd Muller. She lost by a final margin of 3,415 votes. However, she was elected on the party list.

During the 2023 New Zealand general election, Warren-Clark contested the Whangārei electorate but lost to National MP Shane Reti by a margin of 11,424 votes. She was also too low on the Labour Party list and left Parliament.

== Private life ==
Warren-Clark has two adult children who live overseas. She is married to Blair, and they live in Papamoa. Warren-Clark has a law degree from the University of Waikato and was admitted to the bar in 1998.
