= Golriz Ghahraman =

New Zealand politician

- گلریز قهرمان
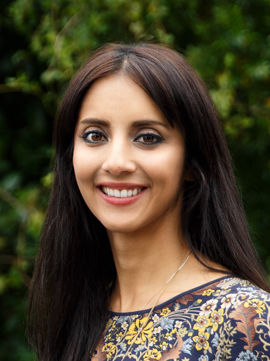
- Ghahraman in 2017

Member of the New Zealand Parliament for Green party list
- In office 7 October 2017 – 18 January 2024
- Succeeded by: Celia Wade-Brown (Note: Normally, list MPs do not have individual predecessors or successors, but Ghahraman resigned during a sitting parliament and therefore was succeeded by Wade-Brown.)

Personal details
- Born: 1981 (age 44–45) Mashhad, Iran
- Party: Green
- Domestic partner: Guy Williams (2016–2020)
- Education: University of Oxford; University of Auckland
- Profession: Barrister, politician
- Website: New Zealand Parliament profile

Golriz Ghahraman (Persian: گلریز قهرمان; born 1981) is a New Zealand former politician and lawyer. The former United Nations lawyer was a child asylum seeker, and became the first refugee elected to New Zealand's Parliament. Ghahraman was a member of the New Zealand House of Representatives for the Green Party from 2017 to 2024, when she resigned amid multiple shoplifting allegations, which she was later convicted of.

== Early life and education ==
Ghahraman was born in Iran in 1981. Her family lived in Mashhad, Iran's second largest city, where her father, an agricultural engineer, worked for the Ministry of Agriculture on the research and development of plant-based alternative fuels. Her mother studied as a child psychologist but was ethically opposed to "psychologists having to pledge allegiance to a religion" so refused to sit the Islamic examinations required for her to practise and never worked as such. Her father was Shia and her mother a Kurdish Sunni, though neither parent was religious.

In 1990, following the end of the Iran–Iraq War, nine-year-old Ghahraman and her family left Iran for Malaysia, ostensibly for a holiday. From Malaysia they booked flights to Fiji, with a stopover in Auckland, where they sought political asylum and were accepted as refugees. Her parents later set up a restaurant and a gift shop in Auckland and did not work in their earlier areas of expertise.

Ghahraman attended Auckland Girls' Grammar School. She has a Bachelor of Laws and Bachelor of Arts in history from the University of Auckland, and a Master of Studies (MSt) degree in International Human Rights Law with Distinction from the University of Oxford.

== Professional life ==
Ghahraman entered legal practice in New Zealand working as a junior barrister specialising in criminal defence, describing it as "the most frontline human rights area of law you can work in practice in in New Zealand; every day you are applying the Bill of Rights Act and you're dealing with unlawful detention, searches and discrimination."

Ghahraman worked as a lawyer for the United Nations as part of both the defence and prosecution teams with the tribunals in Rwanda, Cambodia and The Hague. She had worked on tribunals such as the International Criminal Tribunal for Rwanda, volunteering as an intern; and was assigned to the defence team. Her work on the defence teams of accused and convicted war criminals such as Radovan Karadžić and Simon Bikindi, has caused her controversy, although she has claimed transparency throughout.

Ghahraman returned to New Zealand in 2012 and worked as a barrister, specialising in human rights law and criminal defence. She appeared before the Supreme Court of New Zealand in a case which ultimately led to the police overhauling their rules about undercover operations.

== Political career ==
New Zealand Parliament
Years	Term	Electorate	List	Party
2017–2020	52nd	List	8	Green
2020–2023	53rd	List	7	Green
2023–2024	54th	List	7	Green

Ghahraman was selected as a Green party list candidate in January 2017 for the 2017 general election. She was ranked at eight on the Green party list and contested the Te Atatū electorate, where she won 1,413 votes and placed fourth. On the provisional results on election night the Greens did not attain a high enough party vote for Ghahraman to enter Parliament, though a slight increase for the Greens in the special vote saw her allocated a seat. After the Greens gained 0.5% of the vote in special votes she was duly elected to Parliament, in so doing becoming New Zealand's first refugee MP. Her maiden speech, delivered on 15 November 2017, detailed Ghahraman's refugee story and subsequent career as a human rights lawyer.

In November 2017, it was revealed that, along with prosecuting war criminals, Ghahraman had also volunteered as an intern for the legal defence team of accused war criminals such as Radovan Karadžić, as part of her work with the United Nations. She defended her role in this work, claiming that her role was necessary to "maintaining a fair and robust trial process," that she was "proud to have been involved in that tradition of fair and transparent international justice," and that, given the choice, she would "do it again".

Ghahraman was re-elected a Green Party list MP at the 2020 New Zealand election and 2023 New Zealand general election, ranked seventh on the list each time. She contested, unsuccessfully, the Mount Roskill electorate in 2020 and the Kelston electorate in 2023, placing third in each behind their Labour Party incumbents.

Ghahraman's portfolio responsibilities within the Green Party included foreign affairs, defence, and justice; she held those roles from 2017 to 2024. She also held responsibility for immigration (2017–2020), customs (2018–2020), ethnic communities (2020–2024) and refugees (2020–2024). She sat on the foreign affairs, defence, and trade committee during her entire parliamentary career.

=== Electoral reform ===
Ghahraman was outspoken on electoral reform issues. In early March 2019, she submitted a member's bill, the Electoral (Strengthening Democracy) Amendment Bill, that proposed reforms to seven areas of the Electoral Act 1993 including lowering the country's mixed member proportional (MMP) threshold from 5% to 4%, giving prisoners the right to vote, limiting the total amount of donations to political parties, banning foreign donations to political parties, allowing Māori voters to switch electoral rolls at any time, and lowering the voting age to 16 years. Deputy prime minister Winston Peters and Opposition leader Simon Bridges criticised Ghahraman's bill as opportunistic.

The Strengthening Democracy bill was drawn from the ballot in mid-May 2022. That August, Attorney-General David Parker expressed concern that the bill's proposed donation cap could potentially breach the right to free speech. The bill was defeated at its first reading in September 2022. Nonetheless, much of the proposals in the bill were progressed. The Labour–New Zealand First coalition government banned foreign donations in 2019 and re-enfranchised of short-term prisoners in 2020; the Labour majority government reformed the Māori electoral option in 2022 and introduced, but did not complete, legislation to lower the voting age for local government elections.

=== Shoplifting and resignation ===
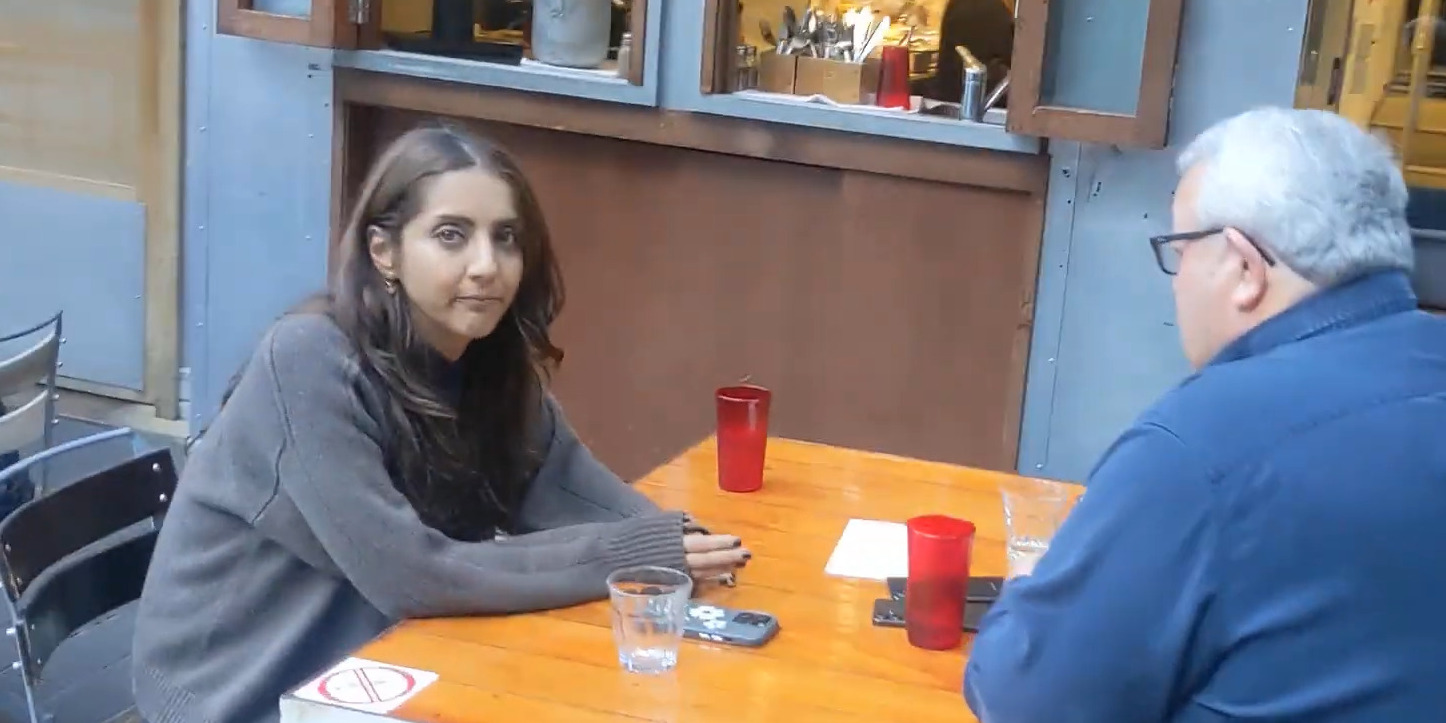
Ghahraman with Gerry Brownlee, then Speaker of the House, in April 2024

On 10 January 2024, Ghahraman stood aside from her portfolios after being accused of shoplifting at Scottie's Boutique in Ponsonby. On 12 January, a second shoplifting allegation at Scottie's Boutique against Ghahraman was reported. Police later confirmed that they were investigating the first shoplifting incident, which occurred in late December 2023. Green co-leaders James Shaw and Marama Davidson said the party was aware of the shoplifting allegations. On 15 January, a Green party spokesperson said that Ghahraman had returned to New Zealand from an overseas trip that day. That same day, police said they were investigating a third shoplifting allegation involving Ghahraman at the Wellington-based boutique store Cre8iveworx in October 2023.

On 16 January 2024, Ghahraman announced her resignation as a member of parliament for the Green Party, effective 18 January. In her statement, Ghahraman said a mental health evaluation found that her behaviour was "not rational in any way" and was due to "an extreme stress response ... relating to previously unrecognised trauma." She said, "I am not trying to excuse my actions, but I do want to explain them. People should, rightly, expect the highest standards of behaviour from their elected representatives. I fell short. I’m sorry". Her place in Parliament was filled by Celia Wade-Brown, a former Mayor of Wellington, who was the next candidate on the Green Party's list at the 2023 election.

On 17 January, Police said Ghahraman had been charged with two counts of shoplifting and that investigations into the allegations were continuing. On 23 January, Police announced a third shoplifting charge, relating to alleged offending at a Wellington retailer on 22 October 2023. In total, Ghahraman was accused of stealing $9978 worth of items under the three charges.

On 27 February, Newshub reported that Ghahraman was facing a fourth shoplifting charge in relation to the theft of a cardigan valued at NZ$389 from Newmarket retailer Standard Issue. On 13 March she pleaded guilty to all four charges.

On 27 June 2024, she was convicted of four charges of shoplifting and fined $1600 and court costs of $260. She was denied a discharge without conviction. During an exclusive interview with TVNZ journalist John Campbell, Ghahraman described her shoplifting as acts of "self-sabotage" motivated by work-related stress and online bullying. In October 2024, Ghahraman appealed the four shoplifting convictions; her lawyer argued the convictions may impact Ghahraman's application for a job at the International Criminal Court. The request for a discharge without conviction was denied.

== Views and positions ==
=== David Seymour controversy ===
In mid-May 2019, ACT Party leader David Seymour sparked controversy with comments made during a radio interview, where he referred to Ghahraman as a "menace to freedom in [New Zealand]" and likened her views on hate speech to tactics used by Mao Zedong, Joseph Stalin, and Adolf Hitler to "gain power through the suppression of free expression". The statement drew immediate responses from all political sides of the New Zealand Parliament.

=== Human rights ===
Ghahraman spoke out against United States President Donald Trump's travel ban, saying in 2017: "I wouldn't travel to America right now. I wouldn't want to face what people are facing – held in handcuffs and being interrogated by security forces, [...] I wouldn't want that [border detention] for anyone."

She believes representation for women and minorities in politics is important: "Ultimately the sinister face of populism is what really pushed me over the edge to run as a candidate. The hate speech became scary. I knew that representation is important. I knew that to stop the very real attacks against minorities and women, we had to get really active, to support each other, and forge paths. We have to become leaders ourselves."

In early March 2019, Ghahraman suggested that the New Zealand Government cooperate with any potential Kurdish and United Nations process to bring home captured New Zealand Jihadist Mark John Taylor, who had joined the Islamic State in 2014.

She was one of four women MPs from different political parties who co-sponsored legislation banning female genital mutilation in New Zealand in 2020.

=== Israel–Palestine ===
In mid-July 2019, Ghahraman was accused of anti-Semitism by New Zealand Jewish Council spokesperson Juliet Moses after she published a tweet on 11 July describing Mary and Joseph as Palestinian refugees. Moses alleged that Ghahraman was denying the Jewish connection to the land by not recognising Jesus was Jewish. Ghahraman apologised that her comments had offended the Jewish community, thanking the Jewish community for their support for refugees. A Green Party spokesperson responded that Golriz had apologised for her "poorly worded remarks" and said that Ghahraman was going to work with Jewish communities to improve dialogue. In response, left-wing blogger Martyn Bradbury defended Ghahraman and the Green Party from accusations of anti-Semitism, arguing that this was an attempt to deflect from Israel's occupation of Palestinian land.

In December 2020, Ghahraman joined fellow Green MP Teanau Tuiono and Labour MP Ibrahim Omer in pledging to form a new parliamentary Palestine friendship group to "raise the voices of Palestinian peoples in the New Zealand Parliament" during an event organised by the Wellington Palestine advocacy group to mark "International Day of Solidarity with the Palestinians".

In response to the 2021 Israel–Palestine crisis, Ghahraman criticised what she regarded as the New Zealand Government's slow response in issuing a statement on the conflict. She also criticised Israel for encouraging "very violent systemic attacks" on the Palestinian population in East Jerusalem and bombarding Gaza. In response, the New Zealand Jewish Council accused Ghahraman of misrepresenting the Sheikh Jarrah dispute and ignoring Hamas' rocket attacks on Israelis, which in their view made her unfit to serve as the Greens' foreign affairs spokesperson.

On 19 May, Ghahraman sponsored a motion calling for members of parliament to recognise the right of Palestinians to self-determination and statehood. The motion was supported by the Greens and the Māori Party but was opposed by the centre-right National and ACT parties. The governing Labour Party also declined to support the Greens' motion with the Speaker of the House Trevor Mallard criticising Ghahraman for sponsoring the motion despite knowing that it was going to be voted down.

In response to criticism by ACT Party deputy leader Brooke Van Velden, Ghahraman also defended fellow Green MP Ricardo Menéndez March's tweet that said: "From the river to the sea, Palestine will be free!" Ghahraman claimed that March was defending the rights of both Arabs and Jews to having equal rights in their homeland.

In response to the Gaza war, Ghahraman described the "scenes in Israel" as "heartbreaking". She stated that "Nothing justifies targeting or harming civilians. Palestinian armed groups and Israeli forces must make every effort to protect civilians now."

=== Religious beliefs ===
Ghahraman describes herself as "agnostic—some days I would say atheist", noting that "It was important for me to get up and say I'm actually not religious at all, because the Middle East also has diversity within it".

== Personal life ==
Ghahraman has multiple sclerosis.

She was in a relationship with comedian Guy Williams, which ended in late 2020.

In June 2021, Ghahraman wrote that she was getting her first Kurdish deq tattoos, stating, "I could not be more excited to help revive this beautiful indigenous tradition and connect with the incredible proud elders I remember wearing theirs back home. They represent a pre-Islamic culture of strength, nature and the night sky."

== Bibliography ==
=== Non-fiction ===
- Know Your Place (2020) ISBN 9781775541424
