= Agnes Loheni =

New Zealand politician

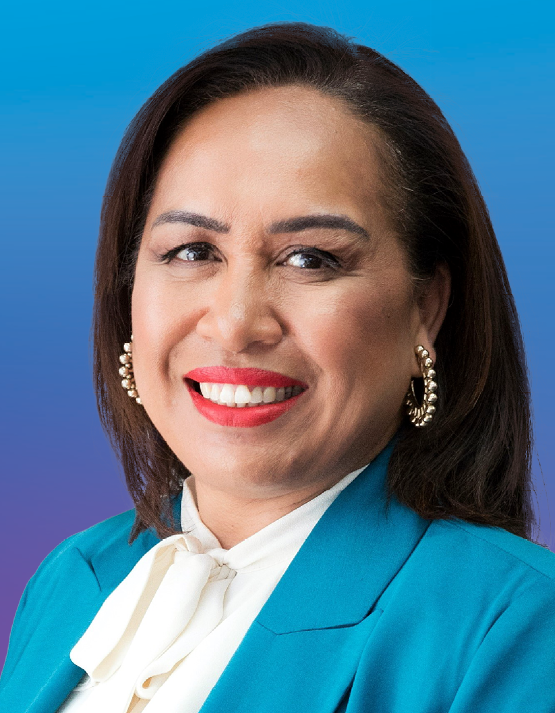
- Loheni in 2023

Member of the New Zealand Parliament for National Party party list
- In office 31 January 2019 – 17 October 2020
- Preceded by: Chris Finlayson

Personal details
- Born: 1971 (age 54–55) Auckland, New Zealand
- Party: National
- Spouse: Ward Kamo
- Children: 5

Agnes Loreta Loheni (born 1971) is a New Zealand politician and a former Member of Parliament in the House of Representatives for the New Zealand National Party. She was declared elected on 31 January 2019, following the resignation of Chris Finlayson. She lost her seat in Parliament during the 2020 New Zealand general election. Loheni subsequently ran as a National candidate during the 2023 and 2026 New Zealand general elections but failed to re-enter Parliament.

== Early life and career ==
Loheni was born in 1972 in Auckland, spending her formative years in Mount Albert. She lived in a state house with as many as 15 family members in just three bedrooms, and was educated at Marist College, Auckland. Loheni is a Samoan New Zealander. She is the eldest daughter of Fepulea'i Pelasio Loheni and Filomena Mata'utia Loheni (Mena Loheni). She also has three sisters named Jackie, Gina and Charlene. Agnes, her mother Mena, and her sisters ran a local Samoan fashion brand called MENA.

She is married and has five children. Loheni has a degree in chemical engineering from the University of Auckland. After graduating she had a two-year OE based in London and then returned to New Zealand where she focused on running the family business selling contemporary Pasifika fashion.

== Political career ==
New Zealand Parliament
Years	Term	Electorate	List	Party
2019–2020	52nd	List	49	National

In 2017 election Loheni stood for the National Party in the Māngere electorate and was placed 49 on National's party list. She was defeated by the incumbent Labour Member of Parliament William Sio, who won by a margin of 14,597 votes. Loheni was not ranked high enough on National's party list to be allocated a seat in parliament. In February 2018 Loheni and several other "next in line" list candidates attended National's parliamentary caucus meeting to help ease their transition into parliament should they enter during the course of the parliamentary term.

Loheni became a Member of Parliament on 31 January 2019, following the retirement of National MP Chris Finlayson, and was sworn in on 12 February. She was appointed as National's associate spokesperson for small business and associate spokesperson for Pacific people by leader Simon Bridges.

In November 2019 she stood for the National nomination in the safer seat of Botany, but lost to former Air New Zealand CEO Christopher Luxon. In May 2020 she indicated that she was seeking the National nomination for the new seat of Takanini, but a month later the party announced Rima Nakhle as its candidate. Loheni was instead re-selected for Māngere.

During the 2020 New Zealand general election, Loheni contested Māngere a second time but was defeated by the Labour incumbent William Sio by a final margin of 19,396 votes. Loheni had been ranked 28 on the National party list, but lost her seat in Parliament due to National's landslide defeat.

During the 2023 New Zealand general election, Loheni stood as a list-only candidate for the National Party, ranked 25. While campaigning, she identified the cost of living crisis, crime and poor education and health outcomes as issues of concern to Auckland families. Despite National's election victory, Loheni was not ranked highly enough to enter Parliament.

Loheni was selected as the National Party candidate in Waitakere for the 2026 New Zealand general election. She was ranked 57th on the National Party list. Based on preliminary results, she came second place, winning 10,805 votes. The electorate was won by Labour candidate Vanushi Walters by a margin of 2,675 votes. No National MPs entered Parliament in 2026 via the party list.

== Views ==
Loheni has taken an anti-abortion stance. She served on the Abortion Legislation Select Committee to consider the Abortion Legislation Act 2020. Loheni wrote a minority report for the committee criticising the bill for what she considered its lack of safeguards on late-term abortions and foetal abnormalities.
