= Rima Nakhle =

National Party politician in New Zealand

Rima Nakhle MP
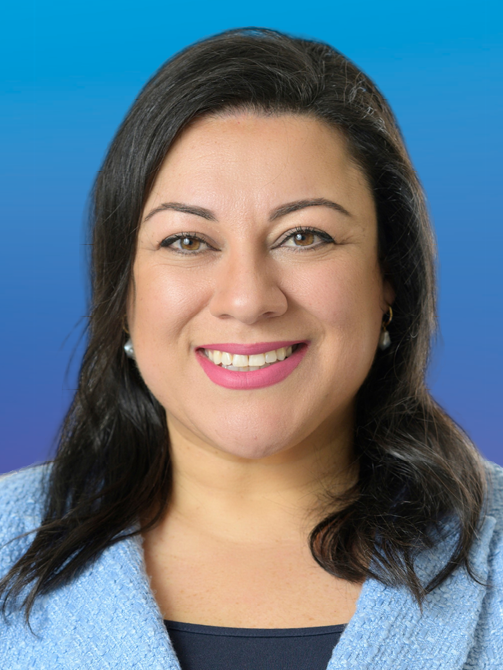
- Nakhle in 2023

Member of the New Zealand Parliament for Takanini
- Incumbent
- Assumed office 14 October 2023
- Preceded by: Neru Leavasa

Personal details
- Born: Sydney, New South Wales, Australia
- Party: National
- Spouse: Roger Nakhle

Rima Jillian Nakhle is an Australian-born New Zealand National Party politician and a member of parliament for the Takanini electorate in the House of Representatives.

== Early life and career ==
Nakhle was born in Sydney, New South Wales, Australia, to parents of Lebanese origin. She attended Western Sydney University and completed a law degree. She is an enrolled barrister and solicitor. She moved to New Zealand in 2012, after marrying her husband Roger Nakhle. His parents are also of Lebanese descent, and lived in the suburb of The Gardens, which is now part of the Takanini electorate. Roger Nakhle's mother Henriette is the Honorary Consul of Lebanon to New Zealand and a QSM holder while their family was once listed on the NBR richlist with an estimated fortune of $200m. In 2014, Nakhle was admitted to the bar in New Zealand.

Nakhle was the executive manager of Te Mahia Community Village, a transitional and emergency housing service converted from a former camping ground owned by her husband's family. The camping ground was reportedly a centre of homeless activity prior to its formal conversion; when Nakhle moved to New Zealand, she applied for permission to officially convert it to a "community village". Her proposal originally faced pushback, with government officials concerned the area would turn into a locus of antisocial behaviour. Nakhle stated in 2020 that Ministry of Social Development considered Te Mahia "the poster boy for community villages". She also established Te Mahia Community Village Trust, which provided sport, education and social activities for up to 300 village members.

== Member of Parliament ==
New Zealand Parliament
Years	Term	Electorate	List	Party
2023–2026	54th	Takanini	41	National
2026–present	55th	Takanini	44	National

=== 2020 general election ===
In June 2020, Nakhle was selected over sitting list MP Agnes Loheni as the National Party candidate for the newly established Takanini electorate. Newsroom described her campaign that year as "an old school, grass roots campaign", focused on in-person canvassing rather than app-based advocacy. She estimated in October 2020 that she had door-knocked 3,000 houses since that June. Despite having been predicted to win the seat, she was unsuccessful in the 2020 New Zealand general election, losing to Neru Leavasa by over 4,500 votes.

=== First term, 2023–2026 ===
Nakhle was re-selected as National's Takanini candidate for the 2023 New Zealand general election, held on 14 October 2023. She defeated the incumbent Leavasa by a margin of 8,775 votes. She is deputy chair of the Māori affairs committee and a member of the justice committee.

A member's bill in Nakhle's name, the Corrections (Victim Protection) Amendment Bill, was selected for introduction in February 2024. The bill proposes to prevent victims of crime and those subject to a protection order from being contacted by prisoners. It unanimously passed its first reading in March 2024 and was sent to the justice committee.

In April 2026, Nakhle's member's bill seeking to stop public funding from reaching organisations with gang ties was selected from the private member's ballot system. During an interview with Radio New Zealand, she said that the National Party was "sending a very strong message that the people administering the poison are not going to be administering the antidote as well." The bill was a response to the previous Labour government's decision in 2021 to grant NZ$2.75 million in funding from Kāinga Ora to a marae-based drug rehabilitation programme run by Mongrel Mob life member Harry Tam's Hard2Reach consultancy.

=== Second term, 2026–present ===
During the 2026 New Zealand general election, Nakhle contested the Takanini electorate for National. She was ranked 44th on the National Party list. On 7 November, Nakhle retained Takanini by 1,487 votes, based on preliminary results.

== Views and positions ==
In both 2020 and 2023, Nakhle campaigned on a 'tough on crime' approach, saying National would set up military academies for youth offenders. She is also opposed to recreational use of cannabis. She said she voted against legalising euthanasia and cannabis in the 2020 referendums.

Nakhle has also advocated tougher penalties for drink driving including ten-year prison sentences and NZ$20,000 fines. She has also opposed gang involvement in drug rehabilitation programmes, stating

And I think to myself, gangs are the reason why most of our drugs in our New Zealand communities are on our shores. They are the ones that are bringing them in, to a great extent, and they are the ones selling them. And to say that the sellers are going to become the saviours is just like a smack in the face, particularly of parents, grandparents and family members who are going through the living hell of their whānau members, their family members, being addicted to the drugs that are being sold by gangs to begin with.

New Zealand Parliament
Preceded by Neru Leavasa	Member of Parliament for Takanini; 2023–present	Incumbent
