= Neru Leavasa =

New Zealand Labour Party politician

Anae Neru Leavasa
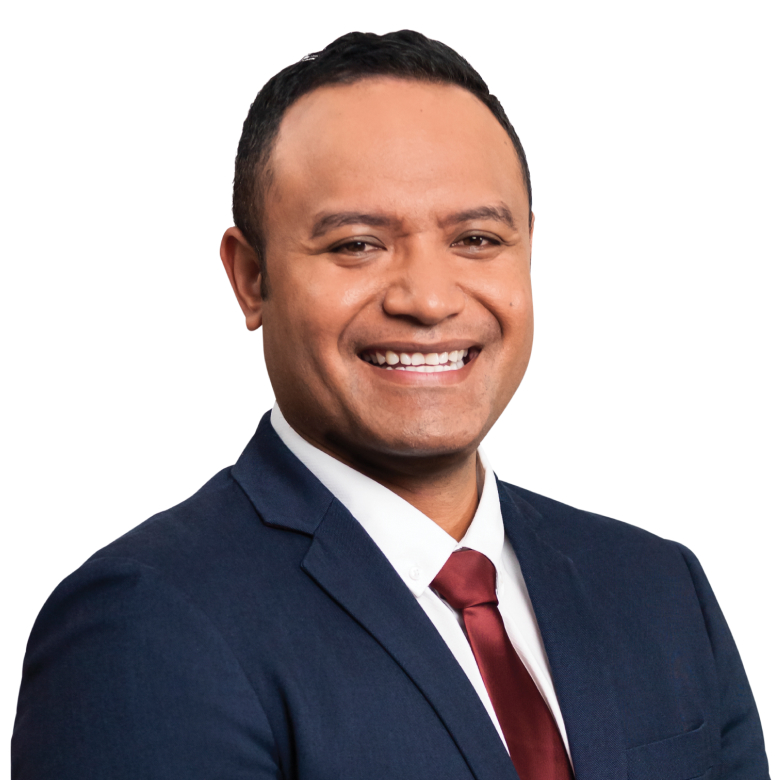
- Leavasa in 2023

Member of the New Zealand Parliament for Takanini
- In office 17 October 2020 – 14 October 2023
- Preceded by: Electorate established
- Succeeded by: Rima Nakhle

Personal details
- Born: 1983 or 1984 (age 41–42) Auckland, New Zealand
- Party: Labour
- Children: 1
- Education: University of Auckland
- Profession: General practitioner

Anae Neru Asi Tuiataga Leavasa is a New Zealand politician of the Labour Party. He served as the Member of Parliament for Takanini from 2020 to 2023.

== Early life and family ==
Leavasa's parents immigrated from Samoa in the 1980s. His mother is from Le'auva'a and Solosolo and his father is from Vaiala and Vaimoso. He was born in Auckland and has four brothers and an older sister. His mother's uncle was Minister of Education in Samoa and his paternal grandfather was Minister of Agriculture in Samoa. Tuimalealiʻifano Vaʻaletoʻa Sualauvi II, the O le Ao o le Malo (head of state of Samoa), is also an uncle.

Leavasa received secondary education at Marcellin College and Auckland Grammar School. As a teenager, Leavasa survived metastatic bone cancer. He has only one lung and has a metal joint in one knee, and walks with a slight limp.

He earned his medical degree from the University of Auckland Medical School and was awarded fellowship of the Royal New Zealand College of General Practitioners in 2014. Prior to entering Parliament, Leavasa worked for 12 years as a general practitioner and sports doctor in Māngere.

He is married and has one child.

== Political career ==
New Zealand Parliament
Years	Term	Electorate	List	Party
2020–2023	53rd	Takanini	52	Labour

Leavasa was elected to the Māngere-Ōtāhuhu Local Board in the 2019 Auckland local elections. He resigned from the board in November 2020.

At the October 2020 general election, Leavasa stood as the Labour Party candidate in the Takanini electorate which he won by a margin of 7,724 votes, defeating National Party candidate Rima Nakhle. He was also ranked 52nd on the party list. Takanini was a newly created electorate that year and had been predicted, including by University of Auckland political scientist Lara Greaves, to be won by National. During his time in Parliament, Leavasa was deputy chair of the health committee and also sat as a member of the Pae Ora legislation committee.

Leavasa and Nakhle contested Takanini a second time at the 2023 general election; Leavasa lost by a margin of 8,775 votes. His position of 38 on the Labour Party list was not high enough to see him return as a list MP.

Leava has been selected as Labour's candidate in the Botany electorate for the 2026 general election. During the 2026 New Zealand general election, he was ranked 31st on the Labour Party list. On 7 November, Leava came second place in the Botany electorate, with 7,782 votes. Due to his lower ranking, he was not elected to Parliament via the Labour Party list.

== Views and positions ==
Leavasa depicts himself as a social conservative with a Christian faith background. He opposed the 2020 decriminalisation of abortion, saying: "I come from a faith background, and so I won't move on my moral convictions. In regards to the abortion legislation, I would have, from a faith background and a conservative view, have voted against it."

Leavasa wants the government to build more housing to accommodate Takanini's growing population and to also reduce the health risks from overcrowding.

New Zealand Parliament
New constituency	Member of Parliament for Takanini; 2020–2023	Succeeded by Rima Nakhle
