= 2023 New Zealand general election =

General election for the 54th Parliament of New Zealand

- 14 October 2023

All 123 seats in the House of Representatives, including three overhang seats (Note: Two overhang seats are added due to Te Pāti Māori winning more Māori electorate seats than total seats distributed among MMP, and one due to the death of a candidate in Port Waikato, triggering the 2023 Port Waikato by-election.) 62 seats needed for a majority
- Opinion polls
- Registered: 3,688,292
- Turnout: 2,884,111 (78.20% ▼4.04 pp)
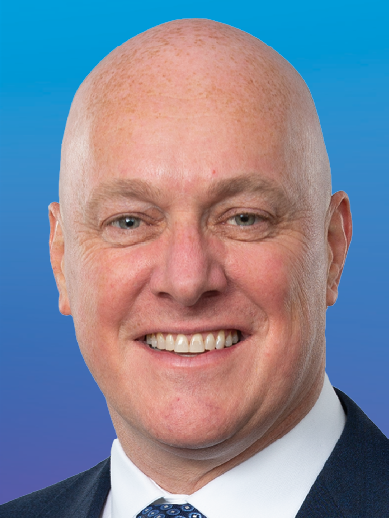

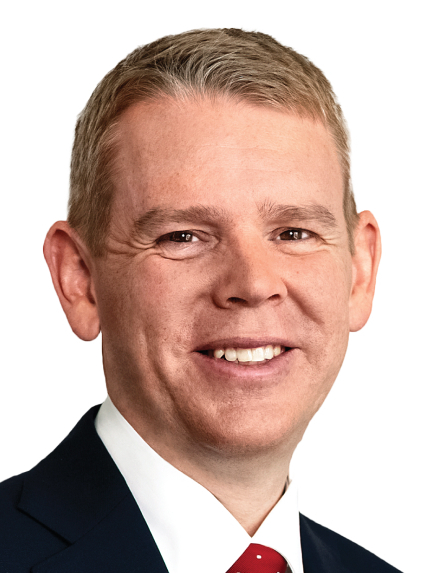

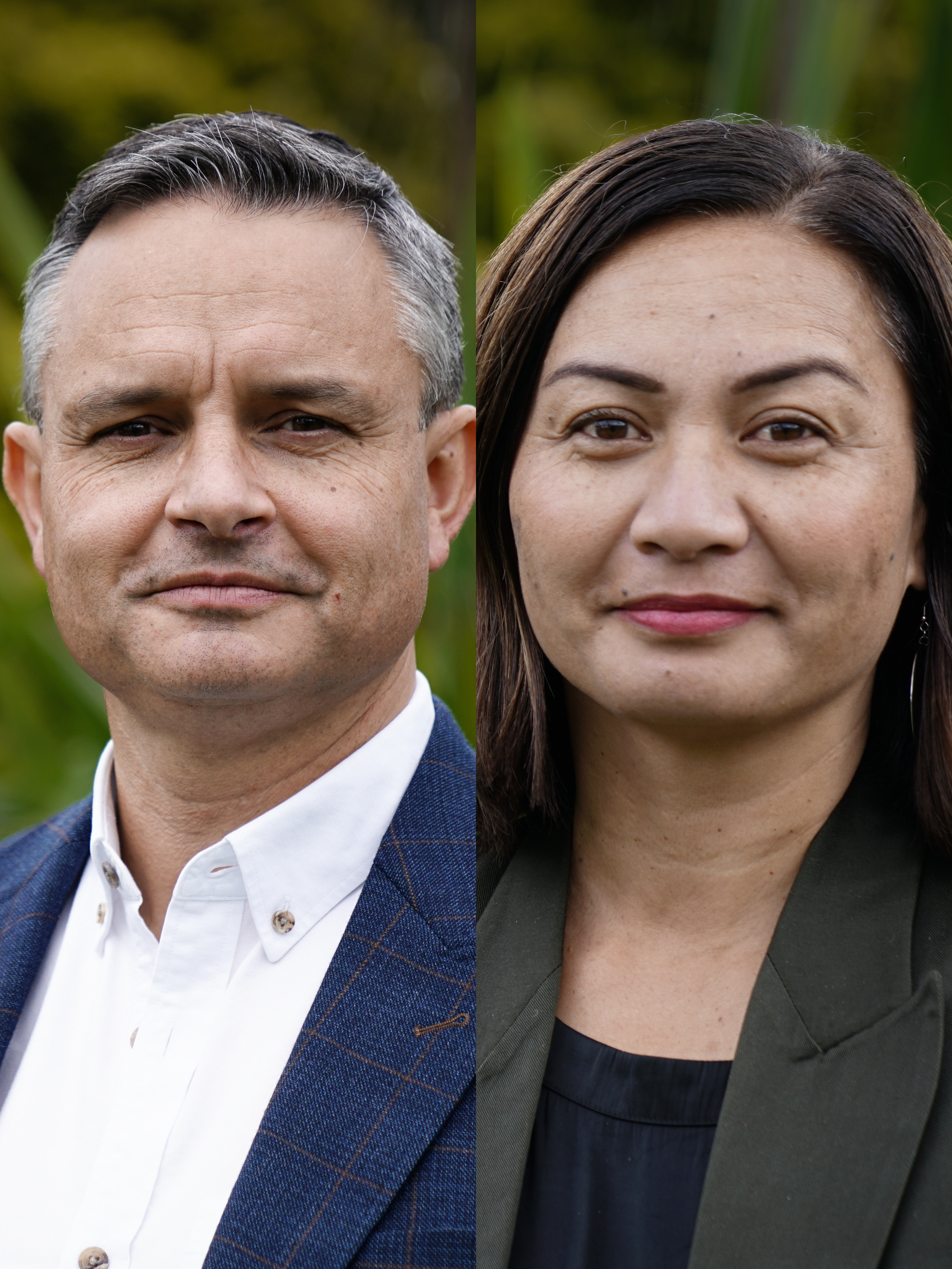

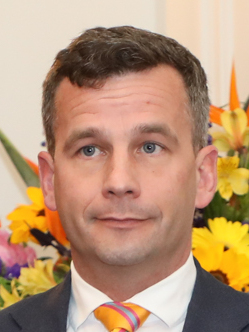

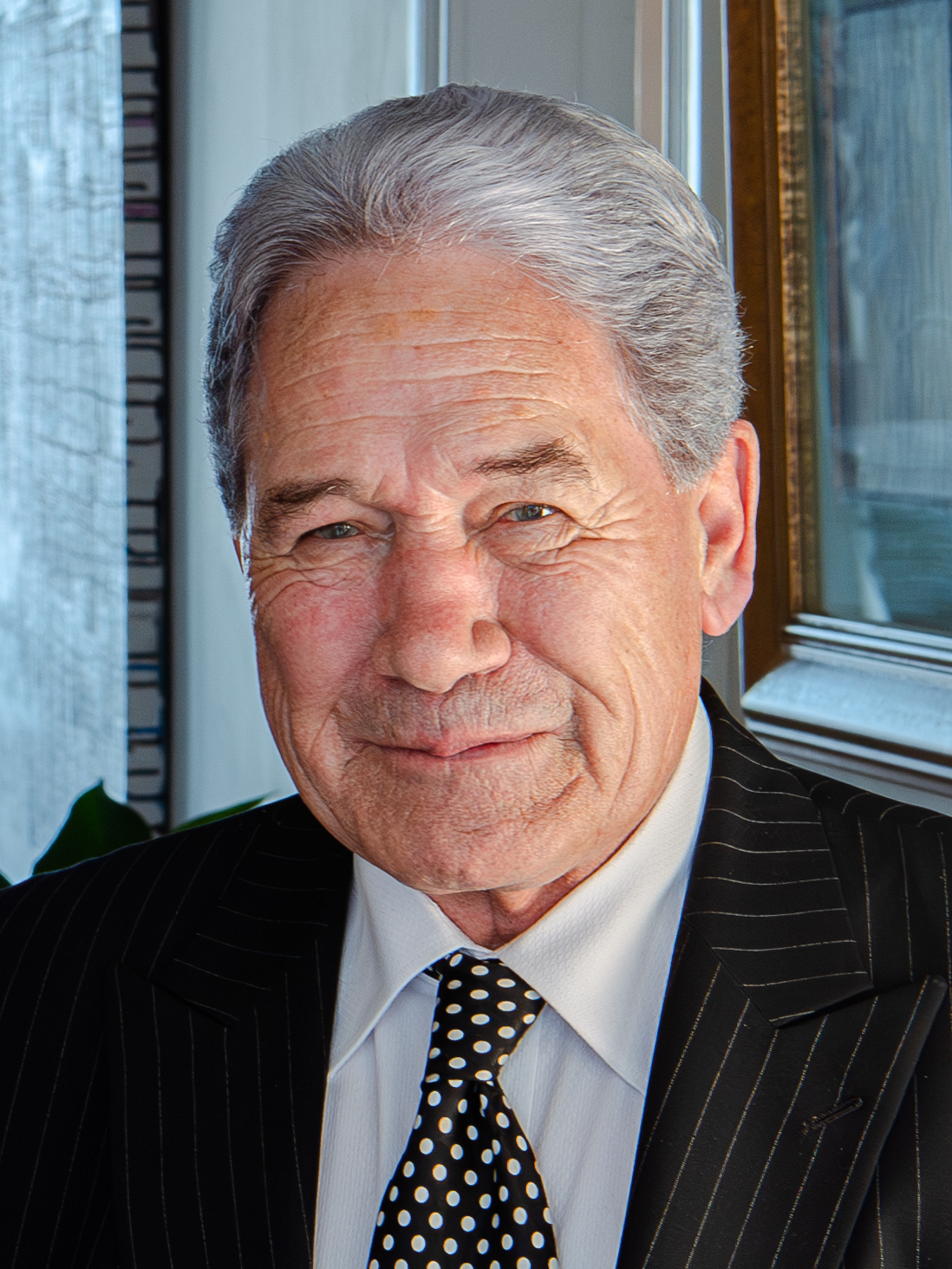

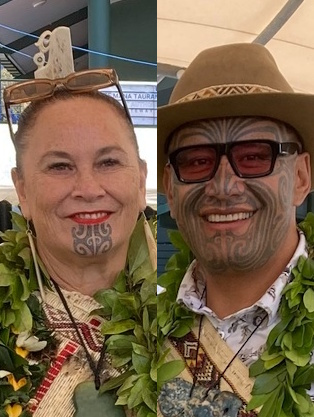
	First party	Second party	Third party
Leader	Christopher Luxon	Chris Hipkins	James Shaw; Marama Davidson
Party	National	Labour	Green
Leader since	30 November 2021	22 January 2023	30 May 2015; 8 April 2018
Leader's seat	Botany	Remutaka	List
Last election	33 seats, 25.58%	65 seats, 50.01%	10 seats, 7.86%
Seats before	34	62	9
Seats won	48	34	15
Seat change	▲15	▼31	▲5
Party vote	1,085,016	767,236	330,883
Percentage	38.06%	26.91%	11.60%
Swing	▲12.48 pp	▼23.10 pp	▲3.76 pp
	Fourth party	Fifth party	Sixth party
Leader	David Seymour	Winston Peters	Debbie Ngarewa-Packer; Rawiri Waititi
Party	ACT	NZ First	Te Pāti Māori
Leader since	4 October 2014	18 July 1993	15 April 2020; 28 October 2020
Leader's seat	Epsom	List	Te Tai Hauāuru (won seat); Waiariki
Last election	10 seats, 7.59%	0 seats, 2.60%	2 seats, 1.17%
Seats before	10	0	2
Seats won	11	8	6
Seat change	▲1	▲8	▲4
Party vote	246,409	173,425	87,937
Percentage	8.64%	6.08%	3.08%
Swing	▲1.05 pp	▲3.48 pp	▲1.91 pp
- Results by electorate, shaded by winning margin
Prime Minister and coalition before election
Chris Hipkins (Labour)
Labour (C&S: Green)
Subsequent Prime Minister and coalition
Christopher Luxon (National)
National—ACT—NZ First

Parliamentary makeup prior to the 2023 election. Government: Labour (62) Green (9) Opposition: National (34) ACT (10) Independents (2) Māori (2)

The 2023 New Zealand general election was held on 14 October 2023 to determine the composition of the 54th Parliament of New Zealand. Voters elected 122 members to the unicameral New Zealand House of Representatives under the mixed-member proportional (MMP) voting system, with 71 members elected from single-member electorates and the remaining 51 members elected from closed party lists. Of the 72 electorates, only 71 seats were filled, with the remaining electorate MP determined in the 2023 Port Waikato by-election, due to the death of one of the general election candidates. (Note: The by-election was won by National's Andrew Bayly.) Two overhang seats were added due to Te Pāti Māori winning six electorate seats when the party vote only entitled them to four seats, with an additional overhang seat added after the National party won the Port Waikato by-election, making for 123 members of parliament.

The incumbent centre-left Labour Party, led by Prime Minister Chris Hipkins, were defeated at the polls, with the centre-right National Party, led by Christopher Luxon, becoming the largest party in the new parliament. The election saw the worst defeat of a sitting government in New Zealand since the introduction of the MMP voting system in 1996, with Labour going from having 65 seats in the first-ever outright majority any party had won under MMP to winning just 34 seats. Labour faced a 23-percentage-point swing against it, failing to mobilise its previous voters in Auckland, especially among young renters or those living in the poorest electorates. National conversely improved its party vote share by 12 points, but returned the second lowest vote share of any party that won the most seats under MMP, the lowest being in 1996. Additionally, Labour and National's combined vote share was the third lowest it had ever been under MMP, and the lowest since 2002. The Green and ACT parties and Te Pāti Maori all increased their vote share, while New Zealand First gained enough votes to return to parliament after being ousted in the 2020 election.

The election had a noticeably turbulent campaign, marked by increased political polarisation and heated disputes over indigenous rights and the theory of co-governance. National made gains in many Auckland electorates that were once considered to be safe Labour seats, such as Mount Roskill and New Lynn, whilst also coming close to winning Jacinda Ardern's former seat of Mount Albert after the left vote was split between Labour and the Greens. The Greens won three electorates, gaining Rongotai and Wellington Central from Labour, while ACT won two electorates, gaining Tāmaki from National. Te Pāti Māori claimed five Māori seats from Labour, which saw 21-year-old Hana-Rawhiti Maipi-Clarke become the youngest MP elected in 170 years and in the process unseated incumbent foreign affairs minister Nanaia Mahuta.

Prime Minister Hipkins conceded on election night, paving the way for a National-led government under Christopher Luxon. To form a government, the National Party required support from the ACT Party and New Zealand First. On 24 November 2023, Luxon announced the formation of a coalition government with ACT and New Zealand First. On 27 November 2023, Luxon was sworn in as prime minister by Governor-General Dame Cindy Kiro, thereby marking the end of six years under the Sixth Labour Government and the beginning of the Sixth National Government.

== Background ==
The previous general election held on 17 October 2020 resulted in a majority for the Labour Party, winning 65 seats, allowing them to continue the Sixth Labour Government unrestricted in the 53rd Parliament. Their coalition partner from the 52nd Parliament, New Zealand First, did not receive enough votes to pass the five percent threshold or win in an electorate, removing them from Parliament. Confidence and supply partner the Green Party received 10 seats, up two, becoming the first minor party ever to increase their share of the vote following a term in government. In the opposition, the National Party lost 23 seats, giving them a total of 33, and ACT New Zealand went from one seat to ten. Te Pāti Māori won a Māori electorate and gained an additional list seat, returning to Parliament after a one-term absence, having lost all seats in the 2017 election.

In the 2022 Tauranga by-election, National retained the marginal seat with a large swing away from Labour. In the 2022 Hamilton West by-election, National gained the seat from Labour.

Since the previous election, the leadership of both the Labour and National parties changed. Christopher Luxon replaced Judith Collins as National leader on 30 November 2021. Prime Minister Jacinda Ardern announced her resignation on 19 January 2023 and was succeeded later that month by education minister Chris Hipkins.

== Electoral system ==
New Zealand uses a mixed-member proportional (MMP) voting system to elect the 120 members of the House of Representatives. Each voter gets two votes: one for a political party (the party vote) and one for a local candidate (the electorate vote). Political parties that meet the threshold (5% of the party vote or one electorate seat) receive seats in the House in proportion to the share of the party vote they receive.

72 of the 120 seats are filled by the MPs elected from the electorates, with the winner in each electorate determined by the first-past-the-post method (i.e. the candidate with the most votes wins). Electorate boundaries for the election were the same as for the 2020 election, with 65 general electorates (49 in the North Island and 16 in the South Island) and 7 Māori electorates. Boundaries are due to be redrawn in 2024, after the 2023 census.

The remaining 48 seats are filled by candidates from each party's closed party list. If a party wins more electorates than seats it is entitled to under the party vote, an overhang seat occurs; in that case, the party winning overhang seats keeps that many extra seats in addition to the 120 seats distributed proportionally.

New Zealand electoral law also allows for an overhang seat to be created if a candidate dies between the opening and closing of the vote. In 2023, this occurred for the first time since the adoption of MMP (indeed, since 1957). The ACT candidate for Port Waikato, Neil Christensen, died on 9 October. As a result, the electorate vote was required to be cancelled in the electorate, and a by-election was scheduled for November, after the general election, to determine the MP for Port Waikato. Voters in Port Waikato continued to cast party votes in the general election. Electoral law requires that 120 seats, excluding overhang, are filled proportionally through the general election. Therefore the electoral system provided for a 49th list MP to be elected through the general election and a 121st MP (excluding other overhang seats) through the Port Waikato by-election.

The political party or party bloc with the majority of the seats in the House forms the government. Since the introduction of MMP in 1996, no party had won enough votes to win an outright majority of seats until the landslide 2020 Labour victory, which gave them 65 seats. When no party has commanded a majority, parties have had to negotiate with other parties to form a coalition government or a minority government.

With 123 seats (because of the Port Waikato overhang and the overhang seats awarded to Te Pāti Māori), a party, coalition, or minority government with confidence and supply support requires 62 seats for a majority. The last time an overhang this large, three additional seats in Parliament, occurred was in 2008.

== Election date and schedule ==
Unless an early election is called or the election date is set to circumvent holding a by-election, a general election is held every three years. The previous election was held on 17 October 2020.

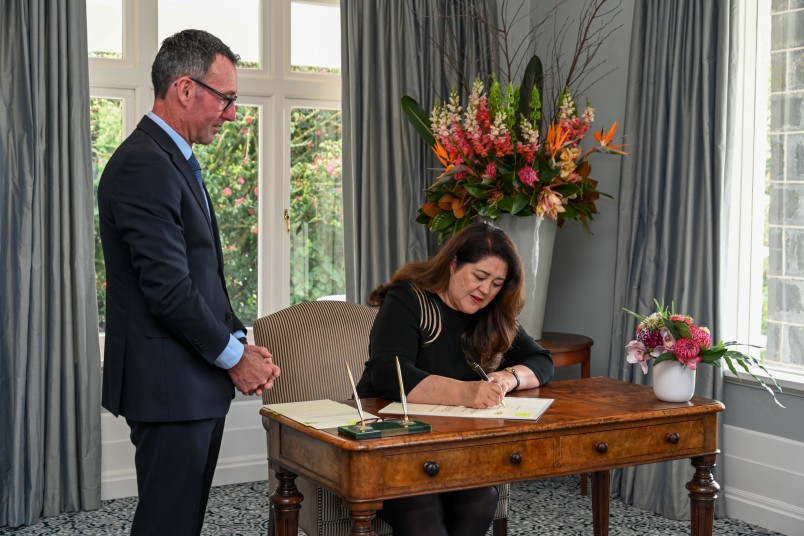
The governor-general, Dame Cindy Kiro, signs the writ for the general election at Government House, Auckland, on 10 September 2023, watched by the chief electoral officer, Karl Le Quesne.

The governor-general must issue writs for an election within seven days of the expiration or dissolution of the current parliament. Under section 17 of the Constitution Act 1986, parliament expires three years "from the day fixed for the return of the writs issued for the last preceding general election of members of the House of Representatives, and no longer." The writs for the 2020 election were returned on 20 November 2020; as a result, the 53rd Parliament had to dissolve no later than 20 November 2023. Writs must be issued within seven days, so the last day for issuance of the writs was 27 November 2023. Writs must be returned within 60 days of their issuance (save for any judicial recount, death of a candidate, or emergency adjournment), which would be 26 January 2024. Because polling day must be a Saturday, and ten days is required for the counting of special votes, the latest possible date that this election could have been held is 13 January 2024. However, it was widely accepted by political commentators, news media and the Electoral Commission that the next election would be held in late 2023. News website Stuff, as part of its annual political predictions, predicted that the election would be in November so as not to coincide with the New Zealand co-hosted 2023 FIFA Women's World Cup, which finishes in August, and the 2023 Men's Rugby World Cup, which finishes in October.

On 19 January 2023, Prime Minister Jacinda Ardern announced Saturday 14 October 2023 as the election date. The indicative schedule for the election is as follows:

19 January 2023 (Thursday)	Prime Minister Jacinda Ardern announces the general election will be held on 14 October.
13 July 2023 (Thursday)	Last day to change roll type (general or Māori) for Māori voters
14 July 2023 (Friday)	The regulated election advertising period begins.
12 August 2023 (Saturday)	Election hoardings may be erected (subject to local council rules).
8 September 2023 (Friday)	The 53rd Parliament is dissolved.
10 September 2023 (Sunday)	Writ day – Governor-General issues formal direction to the Electoral Commission to hold the election. Last day to ordinarily enrol to vote (late enrolments must cast special votes). Official campaigning begins; radio and television advertising begins.
12 September 2023 (Tuesday)	The Treasury released its pre-election fiscal update (PREFU).
15 September 2023 (Friday)	Nominations for candidates close at 12:00 noon.
27 September 2023 (Wednesday)	Overseas voting begins.
2 October 2023 (Monday)	Advance voting begins.
13 October 2023 (Friday)	Advance and overseas voting ends. Last day to enrol to vote (except in-person at polling places). The regulated election advertising period ends; all election advertising must be taken down by midnight.
14 October 2023 (Saturday)	Election day – polling places open 9:00 am to 7:00 pm. People may enrol in-person at polling places. Preliminary election results released progressively after 7:00 pm.
3 November 2023 (Friday)	Official election results declared.
9 November 2023 (Thursday)	Writ for election returned; official declaration of elected members (subject to judicial recounts).

On 30 August 2023, Australian Prime Minister Anthony Albanese announced in Adelaide that the 2023 Australian Indigenous Voice referendum would be held on 14 October 2023. This means that tens of thousands of New Zealand Australians would be voting in two polls on the same day. Some have suggested that the referendum may have an impact on Māori issues in the New Zealand election. Australia has the largest number of New Zealand expats in the world, with 530,491 New Zealand-born people living in Australia as of the 2021 Australian census, making up 2.1% of Australia's total population.

== Parties ==
Political parties registered with the Electoral Commission can contest the general election as a party. To register, parties must have at least 500 financial members, an auditor, and an appropriate party name. A registered party may submit a party list to contest the party vote, and can have a party campaign expenses limit in addition to limits on individual candidates' campaigns. Unregistered parties and independents can contest the electorate vote only.

Since the 2020 election, six parties have been deregistered: Mana on 5 May 2021, Advance New Zealand on 19 August 2021, Sustainable NZ on 15 December 2021, New Zealand TEA Party on 21 September 2022, New Zealand Social Credit Party on 28 February 2023, and Heartland New Zealand on 22 June 2023.

Party	Leader(s)	Founded	Ideology	2020 election result		Seats before election	Status
Party	Leader(s)	Founded	Ideology	% party vote	seats	Seats before election	Status
Labour	Chris Hipkins	1916	Social democracy	50.01%	65 / 120	62 / 120	Government
National	Christopher Luxon	1936	Conservatism	25.58%	33 / 120	34 / 120	Opposition
Green	Marama Davidson / James Shaw	1990	Green politics, social democracy	7.86%	10 / 120	9 / 120	Government
ACT	David Seymour	1994	Classical liberalism, conservatism	7.58%	10 / 120	10 / 120	Opposition
Te Pāti Māori	Debbie Ngarewa-Packer / Rawiri Waititi	2004	Māori rights, tino rangatiratanga	1.17%	2 / 120	2 / 120	Opposition
NZ First	Winston Peters	1993	Nationalism, right-wing populism, social conservatism	2.60%	0	0	Not in parliament
Opportunities	Raf Manji	2016	Radical centrism, environmentalism	1.51%	0	0	Not in parliament
New Conservatives	Helen Houghton	2011	Conservatism, right-wing populism	1.48%	0	0	Not in parliament
Legalise Cannabis	Maki Herbert / Michael Appleby	1996	Cannabis legalisation	0.46%	0	0	Not in parliament
NewZeal	Alfred Ngaro	2020	Christian fundamentalism	0.28% (Note: As ONE Party)	0	0	Not in parliament
Freedoms NZ	Brian Tamaki / Sue Grey	2022	Anti-establishment, big tent, conspiracism	0.15% (Vision NZ), 0.11% (Outdoors)	0	0	Not in parliament
DemocracyNZ	Matt King	2022	Anti-vaccine mandate	—N/a	—N/a	—N/a	Not in parliament
New Nation	Michael Jacomb	2022	Social conservatism	—N/a	—N/a	—N/a	Not in parliament
Animal Justice	Anna Rippon / Robert McNeil	2023	Animal rights	—N/a	—N/a	—N/a	Not in parliament
Leighton Baker Party	Leighton Baker	2023		—N/a	—N/a	—N/a	Not in parliament
NZ Loyal	Liz Gunn	2023	Conspiracism	—N/a	—N/a	—N/a	Not in parliament
Women's Rights	Jill Ovens / Chimene Del La Veras	2023	Gender-critical feminism	—N/a	—N/a	—N/a	Not in parliament

== Candidates ==
=== MPs not standing for re-election ===
Name	Party	Electorate/List	Term in office	Date announced
Jacqui Dean	National	Waitaki	2005–2023	20 May 2022
David Bennett	National	List	2005–2023	26 July 2022
Ian McKelvie	National	Rangitīkei	2011–2023	26 July 2022
Jan Logie	Green	List	2011–2023	5 December 2022
David Clark	Labour	Dunedin	2011–2023	13 December 2022
Paul Eagle	Labour	Rongotai	2017–2023	13 December 2022
Marja Lubeck	Labour	List	2017–2023	13 December 2022
William Sio	Labour	Māngere	2008–2023	13 December 2022
Jamie Strange	Labour	Hamilton East	2017–2023	13 December 2022
Poto Williams	Labour	Christchurch East	2013–2023	13 December 2022
Eugenie Sage	Green	List	2011–2023	21 December 2022
Jacinda Ardern	Labour	Mount Albert	2008–2023	19 January 2023
Todd Muller	National	Bay of Plenty	2014–2023	17 March 2023
Emily Henderson	Labour	Whangārei	2020–2023	17 March 2023
Stuart Nash	Labour	Napier	2008–2011, 2014–2023	3 April 2023
Elizabeth Kerekere	Independent	List	2020–2023	5 May 2023
Damien Smith	ACT	List	2020–2023	11 July 2023
James McDowall	ACT	List	2020–2023	16 July 2023
Kiri Allan	Labour	East Coast	2017–2023	25 July 2023

Tāmati Coffey announced his intention to retire in March 2023 but reversed his decision in July.

=== MPs standing for re-election as list-only MPs ===
Name	Party	Electorate/List	Term in office	Date announced	Notes
Gerry Brownlee	National	List	1996–present	2 August 2022	Represented Ilam from 1996 until losing at the 2020 election.
Adrian Rurawhe	Labour	Te Tai Hauāuru	2014–present	26 January 2023	Speaker of the House of Representatives
Grant Robertson	Labour	Wellington Central	2008–present	27 January 2023	Minister of Finance
James Shaw	Green	List	2014–present	2 February 2023	Contested Wellington Central at every general election from 2011 to 2020.
Marama Davidson	Green	List	2015–present	14 April 2023	Contested Tāmaki Makaurau at every general election from 2014 to 2020.

== Fundraising ==
On 18 January 2023, The New Zealand Herald reported that the National Party had raised NZ$2.3 million from 24 big donors while the ACT Party had raised NZ$1.1 million in large donations in 2022 to fund their 2023 election campaigns. By comparison, the incumbent Labour Party had raised $150,000, the Greens ($122,000) and New Zealand First ($35,000) during that same period. By 23 June, ACT had raised a further $1.15 million in big donations, followed by National (about $700,000), New Zealand First ($517,000), the Greens (about $500,000), and Labour ($458,000).

By 14 September, Radio New Zealand reported that National had received $1.1 million, ACT ($375,000), the Greens ($100,000), and NZ First ($50,000) in business donations between early 2021 and September 2023. During the same period, Labour had received about $600,000 in large donations from unions and individuals but no significant business donations. An interim report published by the Independent Electoral Review has recommended limiting political donations to individuals, and banning businesses and unions from donating to parties. Review member Professor Andrew Geddis expressed concern about banning businesses from donating to parties but allowing unions to donate.

On 29 July 2024, Radio New Zealand reported that the National, Labour, ACT, Green, New Zealand First parties and Te Pāti Māori had received a total of almost NZ$25 million in donations during the 2023 general election, the biggest total declared in New Zealand history and three times the amount declared during the 2017 New Zealand general election. Economist Max Rashbrooke has argued that businesses and unions should not be allowed to donate to political parties and urged New Zealand to follow Canada and several European countries in limiting donations to registered voters.

Party	Donation amount (NZD)	Notes
National	$10,349,174.83	Received donations from Christopher and Banks Ltd, Alpha Laboratories, Graeme Hart and the Rank Group ($400,000), property developer Trevor Farmer ($50,000), Brendan and Jo Lindsay ($100,000), and Jeffrey Douglas ($51,000).
Labour	$4,769,449.21	Received $335,000 from several unions including E tū, the New Zealand Dairy Workers Union, Maritime Union of New Zealand, Rail & Maritime Transport Union, NZ Meatworkers Union and the Amalgamated Workers Union. Also received donations from Les Mills gym owner Phillip Mills ($50,000) and retired judge Robert Smellie.
ACT	$4,262,712.50	Received donations from Christopher and Banks Ltd, Alpha Laboratories, MP Karen Chhour ($5,200), Trevor Farmer ($200,000), and Graeme Hart and the Rank Group ($200,000).
Green	$3,314,650.60	Received donations from co-leaders James Shaw and Marama Davidson ($122,000), the Weft Knitting Company ($100,000), film director James Cameron and his wife Suzy Amis Cameron ($50,000), actress Lucy Lawless ($50,000), and Clarity Cloudworks.
NZ First	$1,877,216.69	Received donations from Tom Bowker ($35,000), Christopher and Banks Ltd, Alpha Laboratories, Trevor Farmer ($50,000), and Graeme Hart and the Rank Group ($100,000).
Te Pāti Māori	$160,749.58	Received $14,900 from Latham Construction and $50,000 from party president John Tamihere.

== Campaigning ==
=== Expense limits and broadcasting allocations ===
==== Parties and candidates ====
During the regulated period prior to election day, parties and candidates have limits on how much they may spend on election campaigning. The limits are updated every year to reflect inflation. It is illegal in New Zealand to campaign on election day itself, or within 10 metres of an advance polling booth.

For the 2023 general election, every registered party contending the party vote is permitted to spend $1,388,000 plus $32,600 per electorate candidate on campaigning during the regulated period, excluding radio and television campaigning (broadcasting funding is allocated separately). For example, a registered party with candidates in all 72 electorates is permitted to spend $3,735,200 on campaigning for the party vote. Electorate candidates are permitted to spend $32,600 each on campaigning for the electorate vote.

==== Broadcasting allocation ====
Registered parties are allocated a separate broadcasting budget for radio and television campaigning. Only money from the broadcasting allocation can be used to purchase airtime; production costs can come from the general election expenses budget. The Electoral Commission determines how much broadcasting funding each party gets, set out by part 6 of the Broadcasting Act 1989. The allocation is based a number of factors including the number of seats in the current Parliament, results of the previous general election and any by-elections since, and support in opinion polls.

An initial broadcasting allocation was released from the Electoral Commission on 12 May 2023. On 31 May Freedoms New Zealand and two of its component parties, the NZ Outdoors & Freedom Party and Vision New Zealand, challenged the Electoral Commission's decision to allocate broadcasting funds to them collectively rather than as individual political parties. The Electoral Commission had decided to allocate broadcasting funds to them collectively on the basis that they were a "group of parties" that had joined forces. The plaintiffs argued that the Broadcasting Act 1989 did not clearly define what was a "group of parties" and that the Electoral Commission had not published clear criteria for how their parties had joined forces. On 17 July 2023, the High Court dismissed the case.

The final broadcasting allocation was released on 8 September 2023. For comparison, the cost of a 30-second television slot in October 2023 ranged from $250 during the daytime to over $29,000 on TVNZ 1 during 1 News at 6pm and Country Calendar.

Party	Broadcasting allocation (NZD)
Labour	$1,291,992
National	$1,084,061
ACT	$368,548
Green	$368,548
Te Pāti Māori	$207,930
NZ First	$173,483
New Conservatives	$139,450
Opportunities	$139,450
Freedoms NZ	$95,042
Animal Justice	$69,310
DemocracyNZ	$69,310
Legalise Cannabis	$69,310
NewZeal	$69,310

==== Third-party promoters ====
Third-party promoters, such as trade unions and lobby groups, can campaign during the regulated period. The maximum expense limit for the election is $391,000 for those promoters registered with the Electoral Commission, and $15,700 for unregistered promoters.

As of 3 October 2023, the following third-party promoters were registered for the general election:

- ActionStation
- Julian Batchelor
- The Better NZ Trust
- New Zealand Council of Trade Unions
- New Zealand Dairy Workers Union
- Democracy Action Inc
- E Tū
- Every Kiwi Vote Counts
- Family First New Zealand
- Forest & Bird
- Generation Zero
- Greenpeace Aotearoa
- Jim Grenon
- Groundswell NZ
- Richard Harward
- Hobson's Pledge
- Living Juicy Ltd
- Maritime Union of New Zealand
- Motor Trade Association (MTA)
- Natural Health Alliance
- New IT Systems Ltd
- New Zealand Nurses Organisation
- NZEI Te Riu Roa
- Oxfam Aotearoa
- Public Service Association (PSA)
- Save Animals From Exploitation (SAFE)
- The S.B. Group
- Tax Justice Aotearoa NZ
- New Zealand Taxpayers' Union
- Voice for Life
- Vote for Better Ltd

In early September 2023, the New Zealand Council of Trade Unions (NZCTU) launched an advertisement campaign attacking National Party leader Christopher Luxon. In response, National's campaign chair Chris Bishop accused the NZCTU and Labour Party of promoting negative campaigning. The NZCTU's president Richard Wagstaff defended the union's advertisement campaign, claiming that it was targeting National's policies including the elimination of fair pay agreements, the restoration of 90-day work trials, and public sector cuts. Labour leader and Prime Minister Chris Hipkins defended the NZCTU's advertisements, stating that the union had published advertisements in previous elections. He also accused the National Party and its alleged surrogates including the New Zealand Taxpayers' Union, Groundswell NZ, and Hobson's Pledge of publishing attack advertisements against him and the Labour Government.

In late September 2023, Hobson's Pledge launched a series of attack advertisements targeting Labour leader Chris Hipkins, with the caption "Delivers division, not outcomes."

In late February 2024, RNZ reported that third party groups had spent a total of NZ$2 million during the 2023 election, 13 times the amount spend during the 2020 general election. According to the Electoral Commission, seven of the 31 registered third-party promoters spent more than NZ$100,000 in the lead-up to voting. These seven third parties were Tim Barry's "Vote for Better" campaign ($386,514.99), Jordan Williams' New Zealand Taxpayers' Union ($371,565.05), the left-wing New Zealand Council of Trade Unions ($299,344.11), Don Brash's Hobson's Pledge ($283,898.73), the clean car advocacy group Better NZ Trust ($266,069.39), Bob McCoskrie's conservative Family First New Zealand advocacy group ($204,771.40) and farming advocacy group Groundswell NZ ($141,061). Other notable third parties with significant campaign spending included the Motor Trade Association (which campaigned against the Government's Clean Car Discount), the Natural Health Alliance and SB Group (which advocated for a repeal of the Therapeutic Products Act and supported NZ First).

=== Party campaigns ===
==== Labour ====
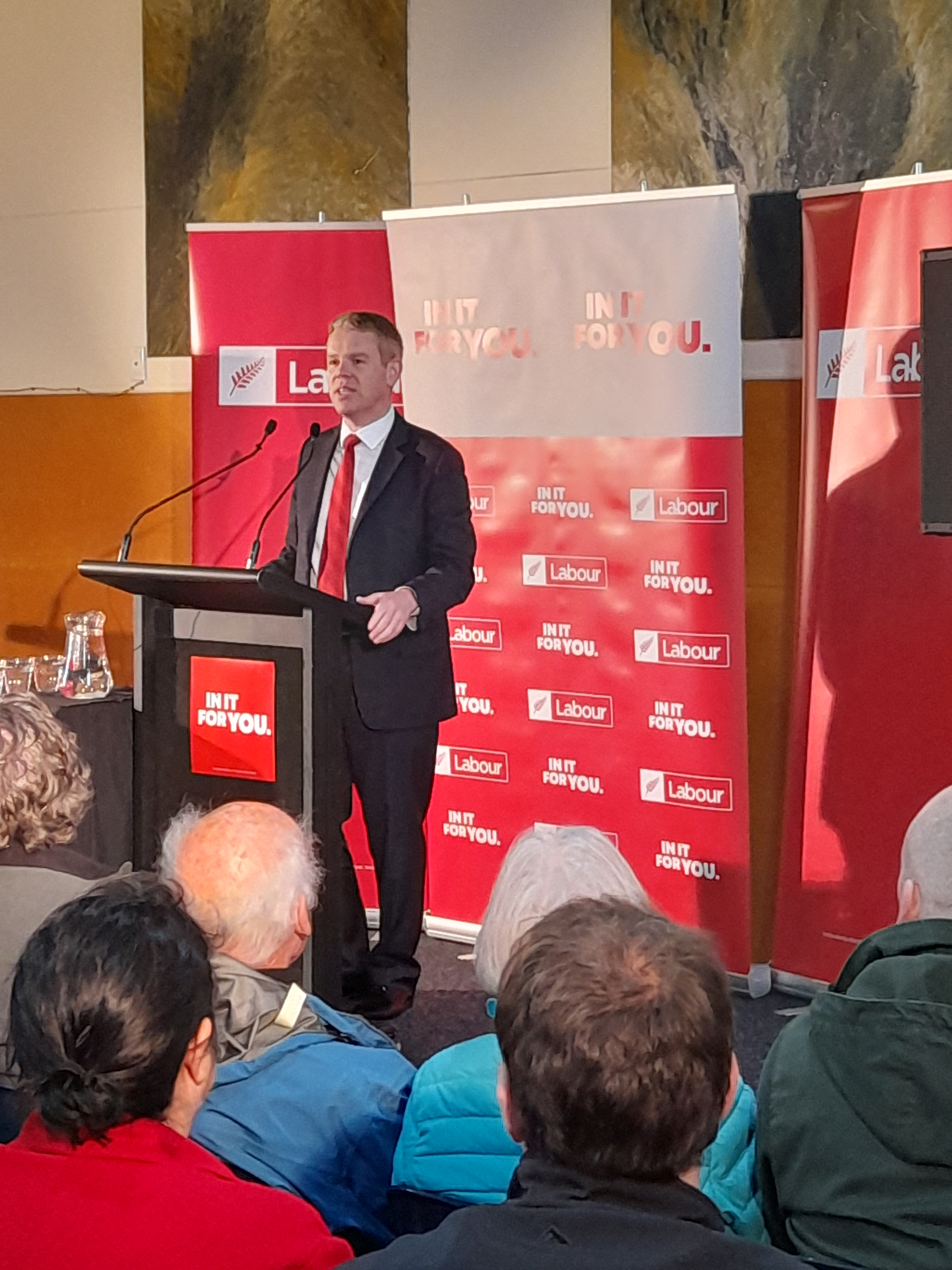
Hipkins in Lower Hutt announcing Labour's policy of removing GST for fresh and frozen fruits and vegetables and increases to Working for Families

The Labour Party's campaign chairperson was Minister Megan Woods and campaign manager was Hayden Munro. The party also enlisted the services of advertising company "Together" as a media buyer.

On 17 May 2023, the Labour Party government attacked National's record on healthcare. On 27 May, Social Development Minister Carmel Sepuloni launched Labour's first election policy: to keep the superannuation age at 65 years and above. On 28 May, Hipkins announced Labour's second election promise: that it would retain the Apprenticeship Boost scheme.

On 12 July, Hipkins ruled out introducing a capital gains tax if Labour was re-elected to Government. On 16 July, Labour launched its election campaign and unveiled its election slogan "In It For You." Hipkins also campaigned on cutting inflation, reducing living costs, public safety, and investing in education, health and housing.

On 17 July, Labour introduced its youth crime package which included building two "high-needs units" within existing youth justice residences in Auckland and Christchurch, improving safety and security at youth justice residences, focusing on crime prevention measures including family group conferences, and empowering Family Courts to require youth offenders to perform community service including cleaning graffiti and rubbish disposal. That same week, the Labour Government announced several justice policies including introducing legislation to punish adults convicted of influencing young people to commit crimes, making the publishing of recordings of criminal behaviour on social media an aggravating factor in sentencing, making ram-raiding a criminal offence with a ten-year sentence and allowing 12 and 13-year old ram raiders to be tried in Youth Courts.

On 31 July, the party released its official list of 76 party list candidates. Several Labour MPs including Foreign Minister Nanaia Mahuta, Soraya Peke-Mason, and Greg O'Connor also confirmed they would be standing solely as electorate candidates.

On 13 August, Labour announced that it would remove the goods and service tax (GST) for fresh and frozen fruits and vegetables, and would increase the "Working for Families" programme for families. Labour's proposed GST policy attracted criticism including economist Brad Olsen, Child Poverty Action Group economist Susan St John, Health Coalition Aotearoa food expert Sally Mackay, Stuff political editor Luke Malpass, Newshub political editor Jenna Lynch, Newsroom journalist Marc Daalder, and The New Zealand Herald business journalist Jenée Tibshraeny. On 15 August, Labour campaigned on extending paid parental leave from two weeks to four weeks if re-elected, almost three weeks after Labour voted down National's proposed bill allowing parents to share their leave entitlement. On 19 August, Labour launched its Māori campaign and released its Māori language manifesto.

On 2 September, the Labour campaign launch in Auckland was interrupted by protesters from Freedoms New Zealand. The Labour party announced a policy of free dental care for under 30s, starting in July 2025. On 6 September, Hipkins announced Labour's five part economic plan and also promised to lead a trade delegation to India within the first 100 days of government if re-elected. On 7 September, Labour announced several law and order policies including adding 300 frontline Police officers, expanding the use of mental health officers, and introducing legislation to make stalking a criminal offence.

On 12 September, Labour campaigned on rolling out free cervical screening for women aged between 25 and 69 years. In response to National's campaign pledge to build a third medical school at the University of Waikato, Hipkins announced on 13 September that the Government would invest in training 335 extra doctors by 2027. On 17 September, Labour released its women's election manifesto and pledged to raise the age for free breast cancer screening, and to develop an endometriosis action plan.

On 18 September, Labour campaigned on introduced rebates for rooftop solar panels and batteries, and a NZ$20 million community energy fund. That same day, campaign manager Woods confirmed that Labour would rule out an electoral deal with the Green Party in tight electorate seats. On 22 September, Hipkins announced that Labour would retain its free lunch school programme if re-elected. On 23 September, Labour promised to introduce a 10-year multiple-entry "Super Visa" that would allow migrants' relatives to make successive visits of between 6 months and 5 years, and also campaigned on introducing a one-off amnesty programme for overstayers who had been in New Zealand for ten years. On 24 September, Woods announced that Labour would build 6,000 more state houses if re-elected.

On 25 September, Labour released its climate manifesto with key policies including a second emissions reduction plan and boosting renewable energy. On 26 September, Hipkins promised that Labour would invest NZ$1 billion in state pharmaceutical purchaser Pharmac over the next four years. On 27 September, Labour introduced its fiscal plan, with a focus on reducing government spending and maintaining current income tax settings. On 30 September, Labour released its Rainbow Manifesto, with key policies including reformed surrogacy laws, a new LGBTQ+ refugee quota, and restrictions on gay men donating blood.

On 1 October, Deputy Prime Minister Carmel Sepuloni released the party's full election manifesto, focusing on improving children's education and funding youth training and work programmes. In early October, Labour confirmed that if re-elected it would extend diplomatic recognition to the State of Palestine by inviting Izzat Salah Abdulhadi, the head of the General Delegation of Palestine to Australia, to present credentials as the Palestinian Ambassador to New Zealand. Following Hamas attack on Israel, Hipkins paused plans to extend diplomatic recognition to Palestine on 10 October.

==== National ====
National's campaign chairperson was MP Chris Bishop while Jo de Doux served as its campaign director. The party also enlisted the services of media buyer Rainmakers, independent creative advertising contractors Sue Worthington and Glenn Jamieson, and advertising company Topham Guerin.

The National Party has not run candidates in Māori electorates since the 2002 election. In 2019, list MP Jo Hayes expressed a desire to contest Te Tai Hauāuru; Leader Judith Collins stated her support in July 2020, but said it would not be possible for the 2020 election due to time constraints. After the election, Collins affirmed the party's intent to contest Māori electorates in 2023. After Christopher Luxon replaced Collins as leader, he confirmed that these plans would continue, but stated that it was a "pragmatic" move and that he felt Māori electorates were incompatible with the principle of "one person, one vote". List MP Harete Hipango was the first confirmed candidate, announced in April 2023 to be contesting Te Tai Hauāuru.

In May 2023, Luxon confirmed that National would not work with Te Pāti Māori if it formed the next government after the 2023 election, citing National's disagreement with the party's support for co-governance in public services and alleged separatism.

On 23 May, a National spokesperson admitted the party had been using images created by artificial intelligence in some of their attack ads on social media, while Luxon was unaware of this. In June, the party removed numerous videos featuring movie and television content from their TikTok account after Newshub contacted studios about whether National was breaching their copyright.

On 11 June, National announced that it would end New Zealand's ban on genetic modification and establish a national biotechnology regulator if elected into government. On 18 June, National announced that it would make gang membership an aggravating factor in criminal sentencing. On 25 June, National unveiled several law and order policies including limiting sentencing discounts, scrapping "cultural reports" and the Government's "prisoner reduction" target, and boosting investment in victim support funding and rehabilitation programmes for remand prisoners.

In early July, the National Party campaigned on building a new medical school at the University of Waikato to address the national shortage of doctors and reversing the Labour Government's cuts to the replacement Dunedin Hospital. On 16 July, Luxon confirmed that National's election slogan would be "Get our country back on track". He also announced that National would create a NZ$500 million fund for repairing both state highways and local roads. On 30 July, National announced that it would take a tough stance against gangs. On 31 July, National announced a NZ$24 billion transportation package that included building 13 new roads of "national significance," investing in three new bus "transport corridors" in Auckland, upgrading the lower North Island's railway infrastructure, and investing in road infrastructure in both the North and South Islands. Luxon also proposed creating a National Infrastructure Agency to coordinate government funding, promote investment, and improve funding, procurement and delivery.

On 9 August, National proposed banning cellphones in schools in order to help students focus and improve their academic outcomes. On 19 August, National released its official party list; with senior MP Michael Woodhouse opting to stand solely as an electorate MP due to his disagreement with his list ranking. On 21 August, National campaigned on spending NZ$280 million to fund 13 cancer treatments. On 22 August, Luxon confirmed that National would not support ACT's proposal to repeal the Climate Change Response (Zero Carbon) Amendment Act and proposed Treaty of Waitangi principles legislation. On 23 September, National announced a new "Parent Visa Boost" which would allow relatives to visit family members in New Zealand for five years, with the possibility of renewal for another five years. Visa-holders would have to have health insurance since they would not be eligible for superannuation and other entitlements.

On 28 August, Luxon confirmed that National would be abandoning its historical "teacup" deal with the ACT Party and would be contesting ACT leader David Seymour's Epsom seat. On 30 August, National announced a proposed $14.6 billion in income tax cuts aiming to relieve "the squeezed middle". These will be funded by a reduction in the public service and by new taxes on foreign home buyers, foreign gambling operators and commercial buildings.

On 3 September, Luxon released National's election year pledge card at the party's campaign launch in South Auckland, which listed eight priority promises. Members of Freedoms NZ protested outside the venue hosting the campaign launch. On 5 September, National announce that it would demote the Māori partnership boards, which the Government had established as part of its 2022 health sector reforms. On 6 September, National campaigned on investing NZ$257 million over the next four years to increase the number of electric vehicle chargers to 10,000 and stated it would end the Government's "clean car" discount programme and "ute tax." On 7 September, National released its tourism policy, which would be funded by a proposed International Visitor Levy.

On 21 September, National announced that it would fast track visa processing for international students and expand their working rights. On 22 September, National unveiled its 100-point economic plan; with a focus on cutting "wasteful" spending and red tape, delivering tax relief, and promoting economic growth, trade and investment. On 24 September, National campaigned on reversing the Government's "blanket speed limit reductions" and restoring highway and local roads' speed limits to 100 km and 50 km respectively.

On 25 September, National leader Christopher Luxon said he could pursue a coalition with Winston Peters New Zealand First after the elections. On 26 September, National proposed a "traffic light system" to transition Jobseeker beneficiaries into the work force, including benefit reductions or mandatory community work. On 29 September, National releases its fiscal plan, promising lower taxes and to reduce government spending and net debt. On 1 October, National released its 100-day action plan. Key promises included removing Auckland's Regional Fuel Tax, banning gang patches and insignia, restoring the 90-day employment period for businesses, banning cellphones in schools, and repealing the Government's Three Waters and "RMA 2.0" legislation.

On 5 October, Luxon announced that a National government would create a Minister for Space. In addition, Willis conceded that under National's proposed tax policy only 3,000 households would get full tax relief but denied that National had misled voters about its tax plan. Former Prime Minister Sir John Key also released a video urging voters to give their "party vote" to National in order to prevent a hung government.

==== Greens ====
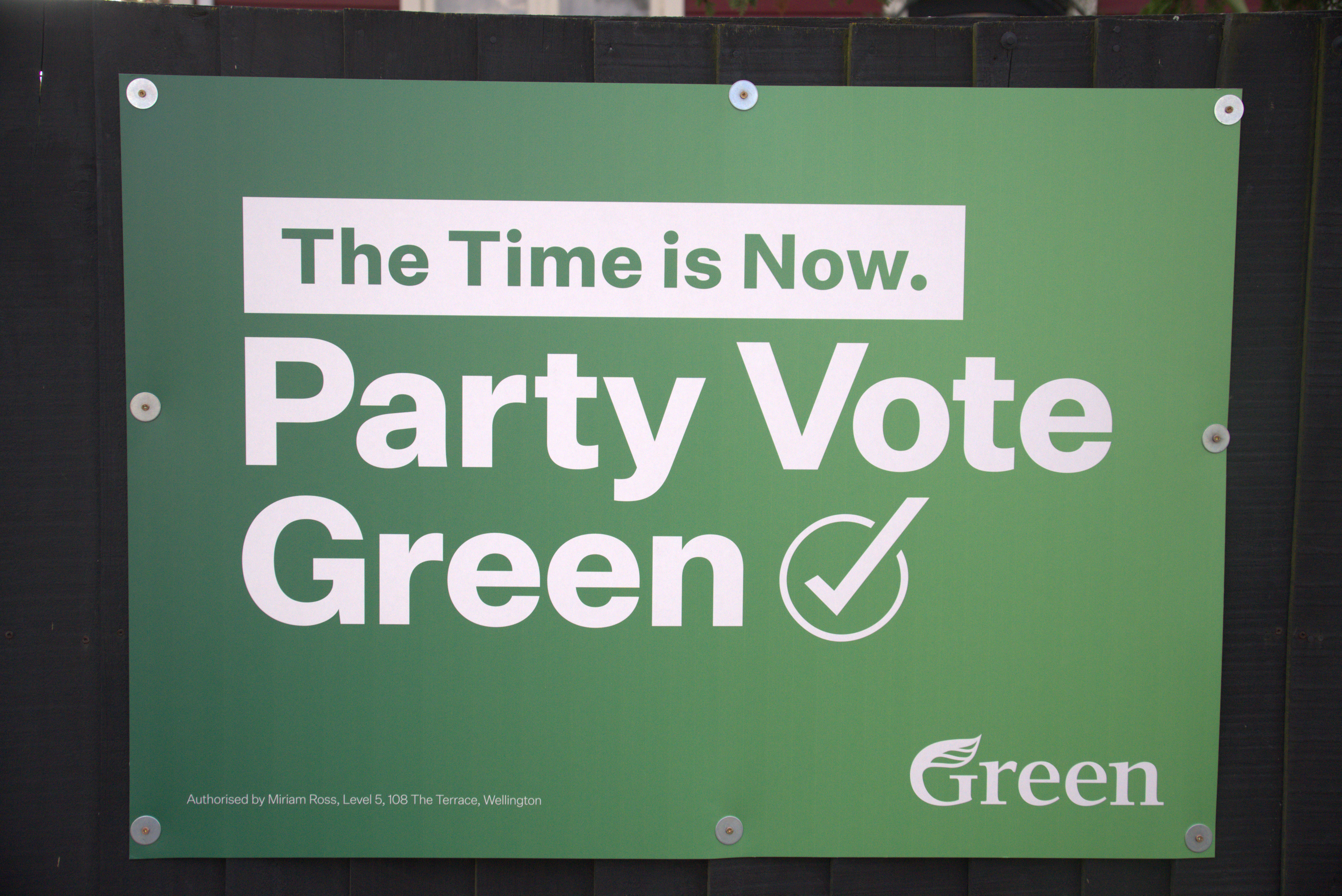
Green Party campaign sign for the 2023 general election

The Green Party's campaign was led by the Campaign 23 Committee, which was convened by deputy mayor of Nelson Rohan O'Neill-Stevens and party activist Gina Dao-McClay. Chennoah Walford served as campaign director while the party enlisted the services of media buyer and advertisement company "Reason." On 18 May, the party announced it would campaign on climate change, housing, inequality, tax reform, and the cost of living. On 20 May, the Greens released their finalised list of 31 candidates, which excluded Elizabeth Kerekere, who left the party to sit as an independent MP until the election whereupon she retired. Following the success of Chlöe Swarbrick's 2020 Auckland Central campaign, the Green Party ran three additional "two tick" campaigns in this election; Ricardo Menéndez March in Mount Albert, Julie Anne Genter in Rongotai, and Tamatha Paul in Wellington Central. The Green Party also campaigned for electorate votes in Panmure-Ōtāhuhu, Tāmaki Makaurau, and Te Tai Tokerau.

In June 2023, the Greens announced they would be introducing various wealth and taxation proposals including tax cuts for anyone earning below NZ$125,000, a minimum income guarantee of NZ$385 per week, a wealth tax on assets worth above NZ$2 million, a 1.5% trust tax, a 45% top income tax rate, and a corporate tax rate of 33%.

In early July 2023, the Greens announced their "Pledge to Renters." Key provisions included imposing rent controls on landlords, introducing a rental "warrant of fitness," providing a government underwrite for housing providers, accelerating the public housing building programme, and creating a national register for all landlords and property managers. On 9 July, the party announced its election manifesto. Key provisions include establishing a new climate change ministry, expanding the criteria for carbon emissions, decriminalising drugs, boosting the refugee intake to 5,000, introducing rent controls, and building 35,000 new public homes.

On 17 July, the Greens launched their Hoki Whenua Mai policy. Key provisions include introducing legislation to return all confiscated land to the indigenous Māori people, removing a 2008 deadline for Treaty of Waitangi breaches, and establishing a process for privately owned land. On 23 July, the Greens formally launched their election campaign along with the slogan "The Time Is Now" and a new campaign video.

On 6 August, the Greens proposed setting up a national dental service to provide free dental health care, which would be funded by a wealth tax. On 13 August, the Greens announced a Clean Power Payment and Zero Carbon Homes upgrade with the goal of equipping homes with solar panels and replacing fossil fuel appliances like gas heaters.

On 10 September, the Greens launched its oceans policies, which included creating an independent Ocean Commission and passing a Health Ocean Act. On 16 September, the Greens co-leader Marama Davidson campaigned on raising workers' minimum annual leave from four to five weeks. On 19 September, Davidson announced that the Greens would support expanding the free school lunch programme to 365,000 children.

On 23 September, the Greens campaigned on introducing a full amnesty for all overstayers accompanied with residency pathways. On 26 September, the Greens pledged to double Best Start payments and extend it to children under three years in order to combat child poverty. On 1 October, the Greens released a document, entitled "The Future is Up to Us", unveiling its three priorities: income guarantee, affordable and healthy homes, and climate action. The party also released an independent fiscal review to support their plan.

==== ACT ====
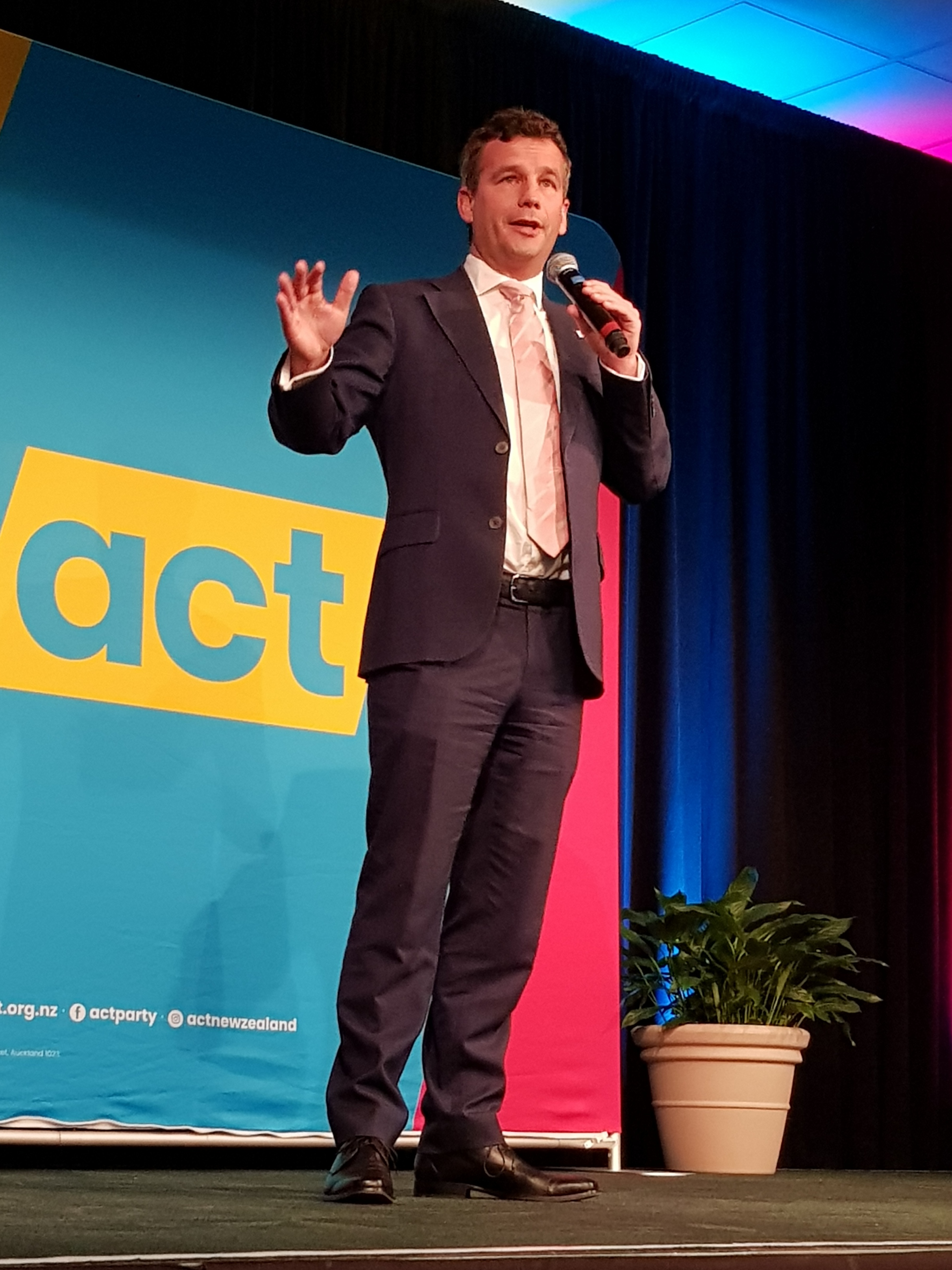
Seymour in Palmerston North for an ACT public meeting on 30 July 2023

The ACT Party's campaign committee chairperson was Nick Wright and campaign chairperson was Stu Wilson. The party also enlisted the services of American pollster Joe Trippi & Associates as its media buyer. ACT has campaigned against gun control. Contrary to the Greens, ACT leader David Seymour has said that he believes it's inequitable for a small portion of New Zealand's population to bear a substantial share of the country's tax revenue. In late April, ACT confirmed that it would be running "two-ticks" campaigns for both Seymour and Deputy Leader Brooke Van Velden in Auckland's Epsom and Tāmaki electorates.

The party launched its campaign on 4 June 2023, with Seymour announcing a policy to create a new "Ministry of Regulation" to police red tape and introduce a new law to ensure that regulation is underpinned by law-making principles. On 9 July, ACT vowed to lower the youth justice age back to 17 years. In 2016, the previous National Government had raised the youth justice age to 18 years, with 17 year olds being tried in youth courts for most offences except serious offences such as murder, sexual assault, aggravated robbery, arson, and serious assaults. On 13 July, ACT released its Oranga Tamariki (Ministry for Children) policy which advocated making the Independent Children's Monitor (ICM) an independent Crown entity, separating social workers' jobs into mentors and Child Protection Officers, and transferring youth justice functions from Oranga Tamariki to the Department of Corrections.

On 16 July, ACT released their finalised list of 55 candidates, with notable newcomers including former Federated Farmers president Andrew Hoggard and former National MP Parmjeet Parmar. On 30 July, ACT announced that it would seek to speed up the Employment Relations Authority's (ERA) personal grievance process in order to help small businesses. On 17 August 2023, Seymour joked about bombing the Ministry for Pacific Peoples during an interview with Newstalk ZB following revelations about wasteful spending by the Ministry earlier in August. During the interview, Seymour claimed "in his fantasy' he would "send a guy like Guy Fawkes" into the Ministry's headquarters and "it'd all be over", apparently implying he would have it blown up. This was a reference to the Gunpowder Plot, planned in 1605 by English Catholic plotters but foiled at the last minute. ACT has campaigned for the abolition of the Ministry, alongside the Human Rights Commission and Ministry for Women. Seymour's remarks were criticised by Deputy Prime Minister Carmel Sepuloni and former National Party minister Alfred Ngaro as inflammatory and insensitive towards Pasifika New Zealanders.

On 20 August, Seymour announced that ACT would set performance benchmarks for public sector organisations, "key performance indicators" for public sector chief executives, and would restore "performance pay" for public sector chief executives.

On 27 August, ACT pledged to remove Māori wards in local governments. On 3 September, Seymour announced that ACT would reverse the Government's ban on oil and gas exploration, ease the consent process for offshore wind projects, and remove the Te Mana o te Wai framework from the resource consenting process. On 6 September, Seymour confirmed that ACT's "red tape review" would focus on the early childhood education sector, health services, primary industries, and financial services.

On 13 September, Seymour unveiled ACT's law and order policies which included reforming the reparations process in favour of victims, imposing tougher sentences for crimes against vulnerable workers, reinstating "three strikes" legislation, and building 500 additional prison beds and 200 youth justice beds. On 15 September, ACT campaigned on stripping welfare beneficiaries off their benefits if they did not seek treatment for drugs and stress or seek work. On 17 September, ACT launched its election campaign on a platform of opposing co-governance and introducing legislation setting out the principles of the Treaty of Waitangi. The campaign launch was interrupted by Freedoms NZ candidate Karl Mokoraka. A Newshub cameraman and visual journalist were also allegedly assaulted by an ACT supporter. Seymour condemned the alleged assaults and vowed to support the investigation.

On 20 September, ACT launched its education and early childhood education policies, with a focus on combating bureaucratic "micro-management" and truancy. Following the pre-election fiscal and economic update, ACT announced on 21 September that it would revise its budget to delay tax cuts and proposed defence spending boosts. On 22 September, ACT unveiled its senior citizens policy, which included reforming the Retirement Commission, ending the ban on pseudoephedrine, and boosting the health workforce. On 23 September, ACT promised to introduce a new "Unite Visa" that would allow to visit family in New Zealand for up to five years, with a renewal requirement each year and an annual fee of NZ$3,500 to cover potential health costs.

On 26 September, ACT announced it would scrap several climate change policies including the Climate Change Response (Zero Carbon) Amendment Act and focus on building infrastructure to cope with climate change. On 28 September, ACT announced several policies that would make it easier for landlords to evict tenants and terminate tenancies. On 29 September, ACT announced that it would amend the COVID-19 inquiry's terms of reference to give the public a greater say. That same day, Seymour suggested that an ACT government would reduce New Zealand's carbon emissions cap to match its trading partners' emissions. On 30 September, ACT unveiled its small business policy plan which involved abolishing Fair Pay Agreements, not raising the minimum wage for three years, and removing the 2 January public holiday.

==== Te Pāti Māori ====
Te Pāti Māori's campaign was led by campaign chairperson and party president John Tamihere and the party enlisted the services of creative agency "Motion Sickness." Labour minister Meka Whaitiri defected to Te Pāti Māori on 3 May 2023. On 15 June, Te Pāti Māori co-leader Rāwiri Waititi released a Facebook video targeted towards Chris Hipkins and Christopher Luxon, calling for the pair to "shut their mouths and stop using our iwi as a political football to score points", in regards to the tangihanga of Steven Taiatini, who was the Ōpōtiki president of the Mongrel Mob Barbarians. Waititi is of the Whakatōhea iwi. Both Hipkins and Luxon objected to Waititi's comments, citing concerns of safety.

Te Pāti Māori launched its election campaign at Te Whānau O Waipareira's Matariki event in Henderson, Auckland. Waititi and fellow co-leader Debbie Ngarewa-Packer led the event, which featured a music concert. The party campaigned on advancing the interests of the Māori people, combating racism, and the "second-rate" status of Māori, as Ngarewa-Packer labelled it. During the campaign launch, a man attempted to assault Waititi but was removed by security. The man was later given a warning for disorderly conduct and resisting police.

On 27 July, Te Pāti Māori announced a raft of tax policies including a zero tax policy on those earning below NZ$30,000, a new 48% tax on those earning above NZ$300,000, raising the companies tax rate back to 33% and a wealth tax on millionaires. On 2 August, the party campaigned on ending state care for Māori children and replacing the present Oranga Tamariki (Ministry for Children) with an independent Mokopuna Māori Authority that would network with Māori organisations, iwi (tribes), and hapū (sub-groups) to ensure that Māori children remained connected with their whakapapa (genealogies). On 20 August, Te Pāti Māori released its official candidate list of 30 candidates.

==== New Zealand First ====
New Zealand First leader Winston Peters says if NZ First is elected to government, New Zealand First would remove Māori names from government departments and bring back English names. The party has also resisted changes to the age of eligibility for Superannuation. Additionally, New Zealand First is against vaccine mandates and proposes that gang affiliation should automatically serve as an aggravating factor in crime sentencing.

On 23 July, NZ First launched its election campaign with the slogan "Let's take back our country." Peters announced that the party would campaign on five key issues: combating so-called "racist separatism," fighting Australian-owned banks and the "supermarket duopoly," investing in health, social services, and elderly care, and adopting "tough on crime" policies including building a "gang prison" and designating all gangs as terrorist organisations. On 30 July, NZ First campaigned on moving the Ports of Auckland and the Royal New Zealand Navy's Devonport base to Northport, extending the North Island Main Trunk Line to Marsden Point, a new four-lane alternative highway through the Brynderwyn Range, and establishing a full inquiry into the Government's handling of the COVID-19 pandemic in New Zealand.

On 16 August, NZ First released a policy on transgender people on bathrooms and sports; which included introducing legislation requiring public bodies to have "clearly demarcated" unisex and single-sex toilets, restricting toilet access to individuals from the opposite sex, and requiring sporting bodies to have an "exclusive biological female category." The National Party criticised the policy. On 20 August, NZ First released a policy of making English an official language of New Zealand and withdrawing from the United Nations Declaration on the Rights of Indigenous People.

On 3 September, NZ First released a cowboy-themed campaign video featuring Peters riding a horse. On 10 September, Peters claimed that Māori people were not indigenous to New Zealand on the grounds that they originated in the Cook Islands and China during a public meeting in Nelson. National Party Luxon criticised Peter's remarks but avoided confirming or denying whether his party would enter into coalition with NZ First in a future government. On 16 September, NZ First released its 31 member party list which included several former NZ First Members of Parliament including Peters, Shane Jones, Mark Patterson, Jenny Marcroft, and former Mayor of Wellington Andy Foster.

On 26 September, Peters announced that an NZ First government would place a two-year cap on the Jobseeker benefit to combat welfare dependency. On 6 October, NZ First released its election manifesto, which proposed abolishing Goods and Services Tax (GST) for basic foods. Following a live-televised TVNZ debate that same day, the party stated it would support a select committee of inquiry to explore the viability of removing GST for from basic foods.

==== New Conservatives Party ====
In August 2023, the New Conservatives leader Helen Houghton released the party's Family Builder policy, which was costed at NZ$9.1 billion for its first year. Key provisions included allowing workers to keep the first $20,000 they earned, child tax credits, allowing couples to split their income, and shifting funding from early childhood centres to parents with the goal of encouraging at least one parent to raise children at home. Houghton said that the Family Builder policy was intended to encourage parents not to split up and to protect the family unit.

==== The Opportunities Party ====
The Opportunities Party aligns with the Greens on various policy fronts, including the endorsement of Universal Basic Income (UBI) and for a more progressive tax system. The proposed tax reforms include implementing an income tax rate of 45% for individuals earning over $250,000 per year, while those earning less than $15,000 per year would be exempt from income tax completely. On 16 June, during a Q&A Wellington Central candidate Natalia Albert, although acknowledging the similarities, said one key divergence from the Greens was that they were open to forming a coalition with either National or ACT.

To secure a place in Parliament, The Opportunities Party primarily banked on their leader Raf Manji's potential victory in the Ilam electorate. In March 2023, TOP announced its NZ$1.5 billion "Teal Deal" policy aimed at youths that would allow people under the age of 30 years to use a "Teal Card" to purchase bikes, scooters, free health care, and skills-based training. The party also proposed a national civic service programme for young people, with participants being given a NZ$5,000 tax-free savings boost. On 17 June, Manji confirmed that TOP was developing an artificial intelligence candidate.

On 16 August, TOP released its health plan, which included fully-funded contraception, increasing placements at medical, nursing, and dentistry schools, boosting the voluntary bond scheme for health professionals and workers, establishing a fully-funded ambulance service, and fully-funded contraception, antenatal ultrasounds, and doctor visits. On 20 August, Manji announced that TOP would introduce a new NZ$3 million investor visa policy that would be used to support a fund to resettle climate refugees in New Zealand.

On 6 September, TOP's deputy leader Natalia Albert announced the party's democracy policy, with key provisions including a four-year parliamentary term, lowering the mixed-member proportional threshold, and lowering the voting age to 16 years.

=== Debates ===
TVNZ announced their debate schedule on 29 August. Newshub announced their debate schedule on 7 September. A debate hosted by The Press between Chris Hipkins and Christopher Luxon was scheduled for 3 October, but after Hipkins caught COVID-19, Luxon pulled out due to being unable to provide any alternative dates.

Table of major debates
Date	Time (NZT)	Organiser(s)	Subject	Participants						
Date	Time (NZT)	Organiser(s)	Subject	Labour	National	Green	ACT	Māori	NZ First	TOP
25 July		VUWSA/UniQ	Rainbow issues	Present; Halbert	Present; Christmas	Present; Menéndez March	Absent	Absent	Absent	Absent
3 August	17:30–19:30	CID	Foreign affairs	Present; Rosewarne	Present; Brownlee	Present; Ghahraman	Present van Velden	Absent	Not invited	Not invited
14 August		Newsroom/University of Auckland	Auckland Matters	Present; Halbert	Present; Brown	Present; Swarbrick	Present van Velden	Absent	Absent	Not invited
16 August	12:00	VUWSA	Climate	Present; Coffey	Present; Watts	Present; Shaw	Present; Court	Not invited	Not invited	Present; Albert
28 August	18:00–20:00	Atamira Platform	Mental health	Present; Verrall	Present; Doocey	Present; Swarbrick	Present van Velden	Not invited	Not invited	Not invited
4 September	18:00	VUWSA/PSAY	Youth	Present; Little	Present; Sheeran	Present; Paul	Not invited	Absent	Present; Arneil	Present; Albert
5 September	19:00	New Zealand Taxpayers' Union	Policies	Present; Jackson	Present; Goldsmith	Present; Menéndez March	Present; Seymour	Present; Tamihere	Present; Marcroft	Absent
7 September	12:00	VUWSA	Drug prohibition	Present; Verrall	Absent	Present; Genter	Absent	Absent	Not invited	Not invited
10 September		Auckland Chinese Community Centre		Present; Sepuloni	Present; Luxon	Present; Shaw	Present; Seymour	Not invited	Not invited	Not invited
13 September	16:45	Environmental Defence Society	Environment	Present; Parker	Present; Simpson	Present; Shaw	Present; Court	Present; Tamihere	Not invited	Not invited
14 September	19:00	ASB	Finance	Present; Robertson	Present; Willis	Present; Shaw	Present; Seymour	Not invited	Not invited	Not invited
19 September	13:00	Stuff	Infrastructure	Present; Parker	Present; Bishop	Present; Shaw	Present; Court	Not invited	Present; Jones	Not invited
19 September	19:00	TVNZ	Leaders' debate	Present; Hipkins	Present; Luxon	Not invited	Not invited	Not invited	Not invited	Not invited
21 September	19:30	Newshub	Multi-party debate	Not invited	Not invited	Present; Davidson	Present; Seymour	Present; Ngarewa-Packer	Present; Peters	Not invited
25 September	19:30	TVNZ/Re: News	Young voters	Present; Williams	Present; Stanford	Present; Swarbrick	Present van Velden	Present; Maipi-Clarke	Present; Donoghue	Not invited
26 September	19:30	TVNZ	Kaupapa Māori	Present; Jackson	Present; Potaka	Present; Davidson	Present; Chhour	Present; Tamihere	Present; Jones	Not invited
27 September	19:00	Newshub	Leaders' debate	Present; Hipkins	Present; Luxon	Not invited	Not invited	Not invited	Not invited	Not invited
28 September	17:30	VUWSA		Present; Roberts	Present; Simmonds	Present; Tuiono	Present; Baillie	Not invited	Present; Foster	Absent
~~3 October~~	~~18:00~~	~~The Press~~	~~Leaders' debate~~	Cancelled (Note: Initially scheduled to include Labour and National leaders Chris Hipkins and Christopher Luxon. After Hipkins tested positive for COVID-19 on 1 October, Luxon pulled out of the debate and no alternative date could be agreed upon.)						
5 October	19:00	TVNZ	Multi-party debate	Not invited	Not invited	Present; Shaw	Present; Seymour	Present; Waititi	Present; Peters	Not invited
9 October	19:15	The Post	Finance	Present; Robertson	Present; Willis	Not invited	Not invited	Not invited	Not invited	Not invited
10 October	19:00	The Press	Multi-party debate	Absent	Absent	Present; Davidson	Present; Seymour	Present; Ferris	Present; Peters	Not invited
12 October	19:00	TVNZ	Leaders' debate	Present; Hipkins	Present; Luxon	Not invited	Not invited	Not invited	Not invited	Not invited

== Issues ==
According to TVNZ's and Vox Pop Lab's Vote Compass online tool, the top five issues in the general electorates were cost of living (28%), the economy (17%), healthcare (14%), crime (9%), and the environment (8%). Within the Māori electorates, the top five issues were the cost of living (35%), Māori issues (15%), the economy (14%), healthcare (9%) and social justice (9%).

=== Law and order ===
According to a Vote Compass survey, 73% of respondents "strongly" or "somewhat" agreed that too many offenders avoided prison sentences in New Zealand. According to data released by the Ministry of Justice, there were a total of 8,500 prisoners incarcerated in New Zealand prisons in June 2023; it was the lowest imprisonment rate per 100,000 people in over 20 years. This was part of the Labour Government's policy of reducing the prison population by 30%, which Labour has vowed to scrap if re-elected. While the National and ACT parties have campaigned on reversing the 30% prison reduction target, Te Pāti Māori has advocated abolishing prisons and replacing it with a tikanga-based (Māori customary) system. The Greens have emphasised rehabilitation and restorative justice.

Vote Compass also found that 76% of respondents agreed with harsher punishments for youth committing "serious offenses," rising to 92% of National and ACT voters.

=== Co-governance and the Treaty of Waitangi ===
Co-governance and the Treaty of Waitangi were polarising issues during the 2023 general election, with The Spinoff comparing campaign discussions around these issues to the "iwi vs Kiwi" debate during the 2005 New Zealand general election. While the incumbent Labour and Green parties were sympathetic to co-governance, they avoided campaigning strongly on the issues due to the controversy that co-governance generated in 2022. Labour has supported the expansion of Māori wards and constituencies in local and regional councils. The opposition National, ACT, and New Zealand First parties have opposed co-governance to varying degrees, despite the former two instituting co-governance arrangements during the Fifth National Government. While National and ACT have opposed the expansion of Māori wards in local government, ACT has accepted other co-governance arrangements such as Auckland's Tūpuna Maunga Authority and the Waikato River Authority. Meanwhile, NZ First has rejected all power-sharing arrangements with Māori including co-governaning indigenous biodiversity. While the Labour and Green parties have supported the Government's Water Services Reform Programme, National and ACT have campaigned on repealing the programme in its entirety.

In terms of the Treaty of Waitangi and treaty settlements, Labour has supported expanding Te Haetea, the online database for monitoring Treaty settlement commitments. The Green and Māori parties have advocated reforming the Treaty of Waitangi Tribunal and Treaty settlements by reopening historical claims, allowing hapū (sub-tribes) to negotiate claims, boosting Tribunal funding and broadening the Tribunal's scope to include private property. The Māori Party has also sought to include council-owned land in Treaty settlements, make Tribunal recommendations binding, remove fiscal and deadline limits, and to end "full and final settlements" in the Treaty process.

In terms of constitutional arrangements, Te Paati Māori has proposed several major constitutional changes including the creation of a separate Māori parliament, entrench the Māori electorates, allowing Māori to switch between the general and Māori electoral rolls anytime, and expanding the scope of the Waitangi Tribunal process. The Greens also support entrenching the Māori electorates, implementing the United Nations Declaration on the Rights of Indigenous Peoples and its local He Puapua strategy, and creating a citizen's assembly based on Treaty principles. By contrast, ACT and NZ First oppose the entrenchment of both the Declaration on Indigenous Rights and the He Puapua documents.

In late September 2023, Horizon Research published the results of a survey on how New Zealanders' voting choices were influenced by their views on co-governance, the Treaty of Waitangi, and racial harmony. The Horizon Research study also identified a gulf between Māori and European/Pākehā voters on the issues of co-governance and honouring the Treaty. On co-governance, 28% of European voters surveyed said that stopping co-governance policies was an important influence on their party vote choice, compared with 17% of Māori respondents. 62% of prospective ACT voters opposed co-governance, compared with 45% of New Zealand First prospective voters and 40% of prospective National voters. Regarding the Treaty, 46% of Māori respondents regarded honouring the Treaty as an important influence on their party vote, compared with 20% of European respondents. The survey found that 31% of voters regarded racial harmony as important; with 34% of Māori and 30% of Europeans regarding racial harmony as important.

=== Disinformation and misinformation ===
Several researchers including Victoria University of Wellington political scientist Lara Greaves, psychologist and artificial intelligence commentator Paul Duignan, and University of Auckland research associate Sarah Bickerton expressed concern that artificial intelligence could be used to spread misinformation and disinformation during the lead-up to the 2023 general election. Similarly, Sanjana Hattotuwa of The Disinformation Project, Joshua Ferrer, and InternetNZ expressed concerns about microtargeting being used as a tool for spreading disinformation and facilitating foreign election interference online. By contrast, Victoria University political scientist Jack Vowles opposed calls to ban microtargeting and argued that microtargeting could be used for positive purposes such as promoting educational policies among teachers.

In early August 2023, the Electoral Commission confirmed it was considering an investigation of controversial Stop Co-Governance organiser Julian Batchelor's pamphlets for allegedly breaching electoral advertising laws. Batchelor's pamphlets included a section telling people not to vote for parties which supported co-governance. Electoral law expert Graeme Edgeler opined that this section constituted an electoral advertisement. According to 1News, the Electoral Commission had warned Batchelor that electoral adverts must have an official promoter statement, including a name and address. In response, Batchelor claimed that the infringement was "extremely minor" and would be hard to prove in court.

In mid August, Stuff reported that several NZ First candidates including property and commercial lawyer Kirsten Murfitt, Auckland consultant Janina Massee, Matamata-Piako district councillor Caleb Ansell, and Kevin Stone had espoused COVID-19 vaccine hesitancy and "plandemic" conspiracy theories, New World Order conspiracy theories, climate skepticism, QAnon, and homophobia. In response, party leader Winston Peters claimed that NZ First's candidate list was provisional and defended the party's candidate selection process.

On 21 August, ACT candidate Elaine Naidu Franz resigned after 1News uncovered a LinkedIn post likening COVID-19 vaccine mandates to concentration camps. ACT leader David Seymour described her comments as "unacceptable" and welcomed her decision to resign as an ACT candidate. A second ACT candidate Darren Gilchrist of Waikato apologised for a Telegram post claiming that COVID-19 vaccines contributed to a surge in drowning in 2021. A third ACT candidate Anto Coates also resigned after describing COVID-19 as a mass hysteria and writing a parody song suggesting that former Prime Minister Jacinda Ardern had thought about sending people to gulags. Seymour defended ACT's candidate vetting process while Prime Minister Chris Hipkins and Te Pāti Māori co-leader Debbie Ngarewa-Packer accused the party of courting conspiracy theorists and being secretive respectively.

On 7 September, the Labour Party removed a social media attack advertisement which falsely claimed that the National Party would end free public transport for disabled people. In truth, disabled "Total Mobility" users have never been eligible for free public transport or the half-price public transport fees announced in the 2023 New Zealand budget in mid-May 2023.

On 18 September, Radio New Zealand reported that National's Hamilton East candidate Ryan Hamilton, a serving Hamilton City Councillor, had for two decades espoused anti-fluoridation and vaccine hesitancy views at odds with the National Party's positions on fluoridation and vaccination. Hamilton had also posted social media posts opposing COVID-19 vaccine mandates and alleging that the number of COVID-19 deaths had been inflated. In response to media coverage, National claimed that Hamilton had since changed his views on fluoridation.

On 16 November, Victoria University of Wellington political scientist Mona Krewel's "New Zealand Social Media Study" found that misinformation and disinformation were not problematic in election campaigning during the 2023 general election. The study was based on an analysis of over 4,000 Facebook posts from political parties and their leaders during the five week period leading to 14 October. The Social Media Study found that fake news posts remained below 3% throughout the election campaign, with a weekly average of 2.6% over that five week period. Krewel's study also observed that various parties and politicians promoted "half truths" or "small lies" throughout the campaign. One notable example was the National Party claiming that the Ministry for Pacific Peoples had hosted breakfasts to promote Labour MPs. In truth the Ministry had held these breakfasts to explain the 2023 New Zealand budget to constituents.

=== Polarisation and vandalism ===
The 2023 electoral campaign has been noted for its increased divisiveness, with a far more tense and discordant campaign than 2020. Some political commentators, such as Henry Cooke, have written about heightened political polarisation.

During the second of the three leaders' debates, as moderated by Paddy Gower on Three, Chris Hipkins read out a quote by Rob Ballantyne, the New Zealand First candidate for Rangitata, that he described as explicitly racist. The quote said to Māori: "Cry if you want to, we don't care. You pushed it too far. We are the party with the cultural mandate and courage to cut out your disease and bury it permanently." Hipkins then asked Christopher Luxon why he was willing to work with New Zealand First. Luxon responded by agreeing that the quote was racist, but said that he was "going to make the call [to Winston Peters on election night] if it means stopping you, Te Pati Māori and the Greens from coming to power." Hipkins later committed to calling out racism and defending Te Tiriti, while accusing ACT and NZ First of race-baiting. David Seymour condemned the statement while Ballantyne later claimed to journalist Tova O'Brien that he was talking about "elite" Māori.

The widespread defacement of electoral billboards has caused concern. A billboard featuring Priyanca Radhakrishnan, who is defending Maungakiekie for Labour, was vandalised with misogynistic language. Several billboards featuring Māori politicians have been defaced with racial slurs, including coon and on one occasion nigger, and the word "Māori" repeatedly cut out. National Party billboards were also vandalised but not in overtly racist or misogynistic ways.

On 29 September 17 Māori leaders including David Letele signed an open letter to National Party leader Christopher Luxon calling on him to "condemn the racist comments made by NZ First, condemn the race-baiting policies of the ACT Party, and commit himself to representing all of us, including Māori." In response, Luxon accused Labour leader Hipkins of creating a campaign built on fear and negativity. NZ First leader Winston Peters accused the letter writers of racism and reiterated his claims that co-governance was Apartheid. ACT leader David Seymour accused the signatories of making false accusations of racism while ignoring the alleged racism of the Māori Party. In response to Seymour's remarks, Te Pāti Māori co-leader Debbie Ngarewa-Packer accused Seymour of suffering from White Saviourism and of taking no responsibility for his alleged ignorance. In turn, Hipkins accused Luxon of exploiting race since he became National Party leader.

On 5 October, while interviewing Greens co-leader James Shaw, journalist Tova O'Brien revealed that the Green candidate for Maungakiekie, Sapna Samant, had a history of racist tweets. These included "White people are stupid" and "can be fooled easily" and also called Labour Minister Priyanca Radhakrishnan "****ing useless [sic]" and an "incompetent" minister. Shaw was unaware of this and when asked if Samant was a good fit for the Green Party, Shaw said, from "what you're saying, it doesn't sound like it". She had also tweeted "Defund the police" which Shaw stated was not Green Party policy.

=== Political violence and intimidation ===
There have also been several acts of political violence and intimidation. On 26 September, Angela Roberts, a list MP and the Labour Party candidate for Taranaki-King Country, was physically assaulted at a town hall meeting. At the Rotary Club in Inglewood, Taranaki, a man who was confronting Roberts "grabbed [her] shoulders" and shook her violently "in order to emphasise the point he was making" before slapping her across the face. Chris Hipkins spoke to the media and condemned the incident. He also addressed Labour MPs and candidates directly, saying that if they were "criticised for not going to that meeting because you don't feel safe going there, I will absolutely defend you doing that." Roberts later said to RNZ "It feels like, incrementally, there is a growing acceptance of aggression in politics and our democratic processes. This must change." She thanked National MP Barbara Kuriger for reaching out to her after the incident.

On 29 September, Hana-Rawhiti Maipi-Clarke, Te Pāti Māori's candidate for Hauraki-Waikato allegedly suffered a home invasion, in which her house was vandalised and a threatening letter was left behind. Te Pāti Māori put out a statement saying that the "premeditated and targeted attack" was "the latest of three incidents to take place at Hana's home just this week... to our knowledge, this is the first time in our history that a politician's home and personal property has been invaded to this extent." The party blamed "right-wing politicians [race-baiting] and [fearmongering] for votes" for emboldening the perpetrators.

On 5 October, an elderly Pākehā/European New Zealander man alleged to be a well-known National Party campaigner was issued a trespass notice by police for allegedly intimidating Maipi-Clarke. Police subsequently confirmed that they were investigating five reports about behaviour against Maipi-Clarke but did not believe that the incidents were racially motivated or coordinated. Detective Inspector Darrell Harpur confirmed that a person had been trespassed from Maipi-Clarke's Huntly home. While Police confirmed the theft of an election hoarding from Maipi-Clark's home, they clarified that the incident had been incorrectly reported as a ram raid rather than a theft. Police also confirmed they were investigating a related burglary and the threatening letter but were unable to establish any criminality. Te Pāti Māori president John Tamihere contested the Police statement and confirmed it would be filing a civil lawsuit against the elderly National Party campaigner following the 2023 election. In response to media coverage, the National Party defended the elderly campaigner and rejected assertions he had trespassed on Maipi-Clarke's property. National stated that the elderly Pakeha man had only wished to congratulate Maipi-Clarke for participating at a "meet the candidate event" but had left since Maipi-Clark was not at home.

On 2 October, National's campaign chair Chris Bishop reported that several National Party candidates and volunteers had encountered several alleged incidents of intimidation, death threats, assaults including a candidate being forced to move houses, a dog attack, and at least one burglary. Bishop alleged that "malevolent actors" were attempting to disrupt the 2023 election and also claimed that the Mongrel Mob's endorsement of the Labour Party had placed National Party candidates and supporters at risk. In one incident, National's Auckland Central candidate Mahesh Muralidhar, his partner, and several volunteers were illegally filmed by a member of the Head Hunters Motorcycle Club who uploaded the video on social media, where it attracted vitriol and abusive language from gang members including a senior Headhunter. The National and ACT parties condemned threats and violence against political candidates as "unacceptable" and "disgraceful." National blamed the intimidation and violence on gang members while ACT urged people to report these incidents to the Police.

=== Protests and disruptions ===
Members of the Freedoms New Zealand disrupted Labour leader Chris Hipkins' campaign visit to the Ōtara Markets on 20 August, a National Party press conference featuring leader Christopher Luxon and transport spokesperson Simeon Brown on 28 August, and the Labour Party's campaign launch on 2 September. In early September 2023, The Disinformation Project's director Kate Hannah claimed that the disruptive activities of "fringe" parties were instigated by lobby groups. She also expressed concern that these disruptive activities would discourage public participation in the democratic process.

=== Social media ===
On 8 September, The New Zealand Herald reported that several political parties including the National, Green, ACT, NZ First, and Labour parties were using the video-sharing platform TikTok to reach younger voters in the 18–24 age group, which accounted for 418,831 eligible voters. National launched its TikTok account in November 2022 with Labour following suit in September 2023. By September 2023, National had gained 54,000 TikTok followers, the Greens 13,400 followers, ACT 12,200 followers, and Labour 1,400 followers. Popular election-related TikTok content included interviews featuring ACT leader David Seymour and NZ First candidate Shane Jones' rendition of the song "Don't Stop Believing." During the lead-up to the election, TikTok added a pop-up directing New Zealand viewers searching for election-related content to the Electoral Commission's website.

On 20 October, The Spinoff reported that several political parties had spent large sums on online advertisements on Meta Platforms' Ad Library (which appears on Facebook and Instagram) and Google. The highest spender was the ACT Party, which spent NZ$334,900 on Meta advertising and NZ$444,000 on Google advertising. The second highest spender was Labour, which spent NZ$250,400 on Meta advertising and NZ$66,000 on Google advertising. The third highest spender was National, which spent NZ$215,500 on Meta advertising and NZ$63,000 on Google advertising. Other parties advertising on Meta's platforms included Green Party (NZ$143,300), Te Pāti Māori (NZ$44,700), TOP (NZ$31,600), and NZ First (NZ$17,900). NZ First also spent NZ$44,400 on Google advertisements.

On 21 October, Radio New Zealand estimated that National, Labour, ACT, the Greens, NZ First and Te Pāti Māori spent between NZ$1.5 and NZ$2.3 million on Meta and Google platforms including Facebook, Instagram, Google and YouTube in the three month period leading up to the 2023 election. The two major parties Labour and National focused on the economy. Labour also spent heavily on health advertising including on promoting its policy of free dental care for people under the age of 30 years. While National and ACT also spent heavily on crime-related advertising, the Greens were the only party to spend on climate change-related advertisements. During the final stages of the campaign, Labour published several attack advertisements targeting National leader Christopher Luxon. While most parties did not target gender segments, 81% of Green ads were viewed by women while 63% of ACT ads were viewed by men. NZ First targeted the over 65 age demographic.

=== Ethnic engagement and representation ===
In mid September 2023, Ngaire Reid, the managing director of Reid Research, stated that Chinese New Zealanders along with Māori and Pasifika New Zealanders were often reluctant to participate in opinion polls, causing these ethnic communities to be underrepresented in opinion polling. Market research firm Trace Research director Andrew Zhu stated that opinion polls could help the Chinese community to feel more engaged in the political process. On 21 September, Trace Research published the results of a survey which found that 70.9% of ethnic Chinese voters supported the National Party, 13.4% supported ACT, 12.5% supported Labour, and 1.4% supported the Greens. Support for right-wing parties within the Chinese community rose in 2023 while support for Labour declined compared with the 2020 general election. Trace Research found that ethnic Chinese voters were most concerned with rising living costs, law and order, economic growth, racial equality and healthcare.

In early October, Radio New Zealand reported that several young Asian voters were concerned that Asian communities were not being heard in the 2023 election and that there was a lack of "meaningful" engagement with political parties. Key issues among Asian voters included health, employment, the economy, and income equality.

On 4 October, Radio New Zealand reported that a record number of Indian New Zealanders were standing as candidates in the 2023 general election across the political spectrum. National had five ethnic Indian candidates, ACT four, Labour two, and the Greens two. Notable ethnic Indian candidates included ACT's Pakuranga candidate Parmjeet Parmar, National's Auckland Central candidate Mahesh Muralidhar, and Labour Maungakiekie MP Priyanca Radhakrishnan.

== Opinion polls ==
Graph of opinion polls conducted; smoothing is set to span = 0.65

Several polling firms conducted opinion polls during the term of the 53rd New Zealand Parliament (2020–2023) for the 2023 general election. The regular polls are the quarterly polls produced by TVNZ (1News) conducted by Verian (formerly known as Colmar Brunton and Kantar Public) and Discovery New Zealand (Newshub) conducted by Reid Research, along with monthly polls by Roy Morgan Research, and by Curia (Taxpayers' Union). The sample size, margin of error and confidence interval of each poll varies by organisation and date.

=== Seat projections ===
The use of mixed-member proportional representation allows ready conversion of a party's support into a party vote percentage and therefore a number of seats in Parliament. Projections generally assume no material change to the electorate seats held by each party (ACT retains Epsom, Greens retain Auckland Central, Māori retains Waiariki, etc.). However, projections that show the Labour Party winning fewer than 46 or 45 total seats (46 being the number of electorate seats held by Labour during the 53rd Parliament, then 45 after the 2022 Hamilton West by-election) assume that Labour will lose at least enough electorates to avoid an overhang. Parties that do not hold an electorate seat and poll below 5% are assumed to win zero seats.

When determining the scenarios for the overall result, the minimum parties necessary to form majority governments are listed (provided parties have indicated openness to working together). Actual governments formed may include other parties beyond the minimum required for a majority; this happened after the 2014 election, when National only needed one seat from another party to reach a 61-seat majority, but instead chose to form a 64-seat government with Māori, ACT and United Future.

On 19 November 2022, New Zealand First leader Winston Peters ruled out a coalition with Labour, claiming "No one gets to lie to me twice". In April 2023, National leader Christopher Luxon commented that it would be "highly unlikely" that National would form a government with Te Pāti Māori or the Greens; however, a spokesperson later clarified Luxon had not "intended to fully rule out working" with either party. At the time, Te Pāti Māori was largely seen as the kingmaker in the upcoming election. Furthermore, Te Pāti Māori may not be prepared to support a National-led government that includes the ACT Party, as Te Pāti Māori has repeatedly accused the ACT Party of race baiting over co-governance and its calls for a referendum on the Treaty of Waitangi. On 10 May, Luxon officially ruled out forming a coalition with Te Pāti Māori. On 27 August, Labour leader Chris Hipkins ruled out New Zealand First as a possible coalition partner.

Source	Seats in parliament (Note: Forecasted seats are calculated using the Electoral Commission's MMP seat allocation calculator, based on polling results.)							Likely government formation(s)
Source	LAB	NAT	GRN	ACT	TPM	NZF	Total	Likely government formation(s)
2023 election result 14 Oct 2023	34	48	15	11	6	8	122	National–ACT–NZ First (67)
1 News–Verian 7–10 Oct 2023 poll	35	47	17	11	2	8	120	National–ACT–NZ First (66)
Newshub–Reid Research 5–10 Oct 2023 poll	35	43	19	11	3	9	120	National–ACT–NZ First (63)
Guardian Essential 4–8 Oct 2023 poll	39	44	14	10	2	11	120	National–ACT–NZ First (65)
Roy Morgan 4 Sep – 8 Oct 2023 poll	33	39	19	15	4	10	120	National–ACT–NZ First (64)
Taxpayers' Union–Curia 1–4 Oct 2023 poll	35	46	13	12	5	9	120	National–ACT–NZ First (67)
Talbot Mills 22–28 Sep 2023 poll	34	47	16	11	4	8	120	National–ACT–NZ First (66)
The Post/Freshwater Strategy 28–30 Aug 2023 poll	34	46	15	14	4	7	120	National–ACT–NZ First (67)

== Voting ==
Overseas voting opened on 27 September with overseas voters having until 7:00 pm on 14 October (New Zealand time; UTC+13) to cast their vote. 74 voting locations were established overseas including 10 in Australia, four in China, four in the United States, and one in the United Kingdom. Overseas voters were also given the option of downloading their voting papers from "vote.nz," and uploading it onto the website. By 27 September, the Electoral Commission confirmed that 78,000 voters had overseas addresses.

EasyVote packs were sent to voters starting in late September 2023. These packs contain the voter's personalised EasyVote card, which is used by polling booth staff to help identify and locate the voter on the electoral roll. The packs also contain a list of candidates and a list of voting places and opening times.

On 4 October, Stuff reported that an estimated 1.4 million eligible voters had not yet received their EasyVote pack. While the Commission emphasised that voters did not need an EasyVote card to vote, delays in posting the cards to households had caused concern. In response, Hipkins confirmed that the Labour Party's general secretary had raised the issue with the Electoral Commission. In addition, all EasyVote packs for Epsom, Mount Albert and Pakuranga had to be reprinted after a quality assurance check found several packs containing misprinted voting place lists, delaying delivery in these electorates.

Advance voting began on 2 October 2023, with 1,376,366 advance votes cast. This was significantly down on the 2020 general election, in which 1,976,996 votes were cast in advance, but still ahead of the 1,240,740 advance votes cast for the 2017 election.

On 6 October, Radio New Zealand reported that 2,600 polling booths would be set up across New Zealand for the 2023 general election. While 800 of these booths would open early, 265 would not be open on polling day. Of those booths only open during advance voting, 61 were located in rural electorates while 204 were situated in regional and urban electorates. In response, the Electoral Commission issued a statement that the opening days and times of individual polling booths were determined by several factors including agreements with the individual location, staffing levels, and local demand.

Following election day, Te Pāti Māori president John Tamihere and Dave Letele criticised the Electoral Commission for alleged "unacceptable" treatment of Māori voters at polling booths including reports of long queues, enrolled voters being told to cast special votes, insufficient ballot forms, and voters being incorrectly told that they could not vote if they did not have an EasyVote card.

== Results ==
Map of the plurality party vote in each electorate

Map of party vote by left/right bloc split

Preliminary results were released gradually after polling booths closed at 7 pm on 14 October. The Electoral Commission aimed to have 50% of votes counted by 10 pm and 95% counted by 11:30 pm. The preliminary results counted only ordinary votes (approximately 2.2 million); it did not count the 603,257 special votes, which can take up to 10 days to be returned to their correct electorate and need to be approved before they are counted. The polling booth rolls were compiled into a master roll to ensure nobody had voted more than once. Official results, including special votes and a recount of the ordinary votes, were released by the Electoral Commission on 3 November 2023, 20 days after the election.

Compared to the preliminary results, the official results showed the National Party had dropped two seats, meaning that it no longer had a majority with ACT, and had to obtain the support of NZ First in order to form a government. The Māori Party took two more electorate seats.

=== Detailed results ===
Summary of the 14 October 2023 election for the House of Representatives
Party	Party vote				Electorate vote sum				Total seats	+/-
Party	Votes	Of total (%)	Change (pp)	Seats	Votes	Of total (%)	Change (pp)	Seats	Total seats	+/-
National	1,085,851	38.08	▲12.51	5	1,192,251	43.47	▲9.34	43	48	▲16
Labour	767,540	26.92	▼23.09	17	855,963	31.21	▼16.86	17	34	▼31
Green	330,907	11.61	▲3.75	12	226,575	8.26	▲2.52	3	15	▲5
ACT	246,473	8.64	▲1.06	9	149,507	5.45	▲1.99	2	11	▲1
NZ First	173,553	6.09	▲3.49	8	76,676	2.80	▲1.73	0	8	▲8
Te Pāti Māori	87,844	3.08	▲1.92	0	106,584	3.89	▲1.73	6	6	▲4
Opportunities (TOP)	63,344	2.22	▲0.72	0	27,975	1.02	▲0.13	0	0	Steady
NZ Loyal	34,478	1.21	new	0	32,240	1.18	new	0	0	new
NewZeal (Note: Formerly known as ONE Party.)	16,126	0.57	▲0.29	0	3,585	0.13	▼0.11	0	0	Steady
Legalise Cannabis	13,025	0.46	▲0.01	0	12,566	0.46	▲0.17	0	0	Steady
Freedoms NZ	9,586	0.34	▲0.09	0				0	0	Steady
DemocracyNZ	6,786	0.24	new	0	12,060	0.44	new	0	0	new
Animal Justice	5,018	0.18	new	0	5,829	0.21	new	0	0	new
New Conservative	4,532	0.16	▼1.31	0	3,167	0.12	▼1.64	0	0	Steady
Women's Rights	2,513	0.09	new	0	0	0.00	new	0	0	new
Leighton Baker Party	2,105	0.07	new	0	2,623	0.10	new	0	0	new
New Nation	1,530	0.05	new	0	433	0.02	new	0	0	new
Unregistered parties										
Independent					34,277	1.25	▲0.87			
Valid votes	2,851,211				2,742,677					
Informal votes	16,267				40,353					
Disallowed votes	16,633				59,043					
Below electoral threshold										
Total	2,884,111	100.00		51	2,842,073	100.00		71	122	
Eligible voters and turnout	3,688,292	78.20	▼4.04		3,688,292	77.06	▼5.18			

=== Electorate results ===
Party affiliation of winning electorate candidates.

The table below shows the results of the electorate vote in the 2023 general election:

Key

Labour
National
Green
ACT
Te Pāti Māori
NZ First
Opportunities
Vision NZ
Legalise Cannabis
Outdoors
Independent

Electorate results of the 2023 New Zealand general election
Electorate	Incumbent	Winner	Majority	Runner up	Third place
Auckland Central	Chlöe Swarbrick		3,896	Mahesh Muralidhar	Oscar Sims
Banks Peninsula	Tracey McLellan	Vanessa Weenink	396	Tracey McLellan	Lan Pham
Bay of Plenty	Todd Muller	Tom Rutherford	15,405	Pare Taikato	Cameron Luxton
Botany	Christopher Luxon		16,337	Kharag Singh	Bo Burns
Christchurch Central	Duncan Webb		1,981	Dale Stephens	Kahurangi Carter
Christchurch East	Poto Williams	Reuben Davidson	2,397	Matt Stock	Sahra Ahmed
Coromandel	Scott Simpson		17,014	Beryl Riley	Pamela Grealey
Dunedin	David Clark	Rachel Brooking	7,980	Michael Woodhouse	Francisco Hernandez
East Coast	Kiri Allan	Dana Kirkpatrick	3,199	Tāmati Coffey	Craig Sinclair
East Coast Bays	Erica Stanford		20,353	Naisi Chen	Michael McCook
Epsom	David Seymour		8,142	Paul Goldsmith	Camilla Belich
Hamilton East	Jamie Strange	Ryan Hamilton	5,060	Georgie Dansey	Himanshu Parmar
Hamilton West	Tama Potaka		6,488	Myra Williamson	Benjamin Doyle
Hutt South	Ginny Andersen	Chris Bishop	1,332	Ginny Andersen	Neelu Jennings
Ilam	Sarah Pallett	Hamish Campbell	7,830	Raf Manji	Sarah Pallett
Invercargill	Penny Simmonds		9,874	Liz Craig	Scott Ian Donaldson
Kaikōura	Stuart Smith		11,412	Emma Dewhirst	Jamie Arbuckle
Kaipara ki Mahurangi	Chris Penk		19,459	Guy Wishart	Zephyr Brown
Kelston	Carmel Sepuloni		4,396	Ruby Schaumkel	Golriz Ghahraman
Mana	Barbara Edmonds		7,372	Frances Hughes	Gina Dao-Mclay
Māngere	William Sio	Lemauga Lydia Sosene	11,700	Rosemary Burke	Peter Sykes
Manurewa	Arena Williams		7,113	Siva Kilari	Rangi McLean
Maungakiekie	Priyanca Radhakrishnan	Greg Fleming	4,617	Priyanca Radhakrishnan	Sapna Samant
Mount Albert	Jacinda Ardern	Helen White	18	Melissa Lee	Ricardo Menéndez March
Mount Roskill	Michael Wood	Carlos Cheung	1,565	Michael Wood	Suveen Sanis Walgampola
Napier	Stuart Nash	Katie Nimon	8,870	Mark Hutchinson	Julienne Dickey
Nelson	Rachel Boyack		26	Blair Cameron	Jace Hobbs
New Lynn	Deborah Russell	Paulo Garcia	1,013	Deborah Russell	Steve Abel
New Plymouth	Glen Bennett	David MacLeod	6,991	Glen Bennett	Bruce McGechan
North Shore	Simon Watts		16,330	George Hampton	Pat Baskett
Northcote	Shanan Halbert	Dan Bidois	9,270	Shanan Halbert	Andrew Shaw
Northland	Willow-Jean Prime	Grant McCallum	6,087	Willow-Jean Prime	Shane Jones
Ōhāriu	Greg O'Connor		1,260	Nicola Willis	Stephanie Rodgers
Ōtaki	Terisa Ngobi	Tim Costley	6,271	Terisa Ngobi	Ali Muhammad
Pakuranga	Simeon Brown		18,710	Nerissa Henry	Parmjeet Parmar
Palmerston North	Tangi Utikere		3,087	Ankit Bansal	Mike Harnett
Panmure-Ōtāhuhu	Jenny Salesa		7,970	Navtej Randhawa	Efeso Collins
Papakura	Judith Collins		13,459	Anahila Kanongata'a-Suisuiki	Mike McCormack
Port Waikato	Electorate vote cancelled as a result of candidate death				
Rangitata	Jo Luxton	James Meager	10,846	Jo Luxton	Robert Ballantyne
Rangitīkei	Ian McKelvie	Suze Redmayne	9,785	Zulfiqar Butt	Andrew Hoggard
Remutaka	Chris Hipkins		8,859	Emma Chatterton	Chris Norton
Rongotai	Paul Eagle	Julie Anne Genter	2,717	Fleur Fitzsimons	Karunā Muthu
Rotorua	Todd McClay		8,923	Ben Sandford	Merepeka Raukawa-Tait
Selwyn	Nicola Grigg		19,782	Luke Jones	Ben Harvey
Southland	Joseph Mooney		17,211	Simon McCallum	Dave Kennedy
Taieri	Ingrid Leary		1,443	Matthew French	Scott Willis
Takanini	Neru Leavasa	Rima Nakhle	8,775	Neru Leavasa	Rae Ah Chee
Tāmaki	Simon O'Connor	Brooke van Velden	4,158	Simon O'Connor	Fesaitu Solomone
Taranaki-King Country	Barbara Kuriger		14,355	Angela Roberts	Bill Burr
Taupō	Louise Upston		16,505	Aladdin Al-Bustanji	George O'Connor-Patena
Tauranga	Sam Uffindell		9,370	Jan Tinetti	Christine Young
Te Atatū	Phil Twyford		131	Angee Nicholas	Zooey Neumann
Tukituki	Anna Lorck	Catherine Wedd	10,118	Anna Lorck	Nick Ratcliffe
Upper Harbour	Vanushi Walters	Cameron Brewer	11,192	Vanushi Walters	Thea Doyle
Waikato	Tim van de Molen		18,046	Jamie Toko	Stuart Husband
Waimakariri	Matt Doocey		13,010	Dan Rosewarne	Ross Eric Campbell
Wairarapa	Kieran McAnulty	Mike Butterick	2,816	Kieran McAnulty	Simon Francis Casey
Waitaki	Jacqui Dean	Miles Anderson	12,151	Ethan Reille	Pleasance Hansen
Wellington Central	Grant Robertson	Tamatha Paul	6,066	Ibrahim Omer	Scott Sheeran
West Coast-Tasman	Damien O'Connor	Maureen Pugh	1,017	Damien O'Connor	Patrick Sean Phelps
Whanganui	Steph Lewis	Carl Bates	5,417	Steph Lewis	William Arnold
Whangaparāoa	Mark Mitchell		23,376	Estefania Muller Pallarès	Lorraine Newman
Whangārei	Emily Henderson	Shane Reti	11,424	Angie Warren-Clark	Gavin Benney
Wigram	Megan Woods		1,187	Tracy Summerfield	Richard Wesley
Māori electorates
Hauraki-Waikato	Nanaia Mahuta	Hana-Rawhiti Maipi-Clarke	2,911	Nanaia Mahuta	Donna Pokere-Phillips
Ikaroa-Rāwhiti	Meka Whaitiri	Cushla Tangaere-Manuel	2,843	Meka Whaitiri	Ata Tuhakaraina
Tāmaki Makaurau	Peeni Henare	Takutai Tarsh Kemp	42	Peeni Henare	Darleen Tana
Te Tai Hauāuru	Adrian Rurawhe	Debbie Ngarewa-Packer	9,222	Soraya Peke-Mason	Harete Hipango
Te Tai Tokerau	Kelvin Davis	Mariameno Kapa-Kingi	517	Kelvin Davis	Hūhana Lyndon
Te Tai Tonga	Rino Tirikatene	Tākuta Ferris	2,824	Rino Tirikatene	Rebecca Robin
Waiariki	Rawiri Waititi		15,891	Toni Boynton	Charles Tiki Hunia

=== List results ===
The following list candidates were elected:

National	Labour	Green	ACT	NZ First
Nicola Willis (2); Paul Goldsmith (5); Melissa Lee (13); Gerry Brownlee (14); Andrew Bayly (15)	Kelvin Davis (2); Grant Robertson (4); Jan Tinetti (6); Ayesha Verrall (7); Willie Jackson (8); Willow-Jean Prime (9); Damien O'Connor (10); Adrian Rurawhe (11); Andrew Little (12); David Parker (13); Peeni Henare (14); Priyanca Radhakrishnan (15); Kieran McAnulty (16); Ginny Andersen (17); Jo Luxton (19); Rino Tirikatene (21); Deborah Russell (22)	Marama Davidson (1); James Shaw (2); Teanau Tuiono (5); Lan Pham (6); Golriz Ghahraman (7); Ricardo Menéndez March (8); Steve Abel (9); Hūhana Lyndon (10); Efeso Collins (11); Scott Willis (12); Darleen Tana (13); Kahurangi Carter (14)	Nicole McKee (3); Todd Stephenson (4); Andrew Hoggard (5); Karen Chhour (6); Mark Cameron (7); Simon Court (8); Parmjeet Parmar (9); Laura Trask (10); Cameron Luxton (11)	Winston Peters (1); Shane Jones (2); Casey Costello (3); Mark Patterson (4); Jenny Marcroft (5); Jamie Arbuckle (6); Andy Foster (7); Tanya Unkovich (8)

=== MPs who lost their seats ===
Name	Party	Electorate/List	Term in office
Camilla Belich	Labour	List	2020–2023
Glen Bennett	Labour	New Plymouth	2020–2023
Naisi Chen	Labour	List	2020–2023
Tāmati Coffey	Labour	List	2017–2023
Liz Craig	Labour	List	2017–2023
Shanan Halbert	Labour	Northcote	2020–2023
Anahila Kanongata'a-Suisuiki	Labour	List	2017–2023
Neru Leavasa	Labour	Takanini	2020–2023
Steph Lewis	Labour	Whanganui	2020–2023
Anna Lorck	Labour	Tukituki	2020–2023
Nanaia Mahuta	Labour	Hauraki-Waikato	1996–2023
Tracey McLellan	Labour	Banks Peninsula	2020–2023
Terisa Ngobi	Labour	Ōtaki	2020–2023
Ibrahim Omer	Labour	List	2020–2023
Sarah Pallett	Labour	Ilam	2020–2023
Soraya Peke-Mason	Labour	List	2022–2023
Angela Roberts	Labour	List	2020–2023
Dan Rosewarne	Labour	List	2022–2023
Vanushi Walters	Labour	Upper Harbour	2020–2023
Angie Warren-Clark	Labour	List	2017–2023
Michael Wood	Labour	Mount Roskill	2016–2023
Harete Hipango	National	List	2017–2020, 2021–2023
Simon O'Connor	National	Tāmaki	2011–2023
Michael Woodhouse	National	List	2008–2023
Chris Baillie	ACT	List	2020–2023
Toni Severin	ACT	List	2020–2023
Meka Whaitiri	Te Pāti Māori	Ikaroa-Rāwhiti	2013–2023

Andrew Little was elected as a Labour Party list MP but resigned, effective from 5 December, after Labour lost the election. Unsuccessful Ikaroa-Rāwhiti candidate Meka Whaitiri had held office as an independent (previously Labour Party) but contested the election for Te Pāti Māori.

=== New MPs ===
Based on preliminary results, 40 candidates who had never been in parliament before were returned. Of those, 21 were from National, 2 from Labour, 7 from the Greens, 4 from ACT, 2 from Te Pāti Māori, and 4 from NZ First. Based on preliminary results, parliament had 122 representatives, i.e. nearly one-third of the members were to be newcomers.

When the final results were released on 3 November, there were some changes. Te Pāti Māori had taken two additional electorates from Labour, and both Te Pāti Māori politicians (Takutai Tarsh Kemp and Mariameno Kapa-Kingi) were new to parliament; the beaten Labour candidates (Peeni Henare and Kelvin Davis remained in parliament via the Labour list. The Green Party gained a higher share of the vote, giving it an additional list seat that was going to a newcomer (Kahurangi Carter). Two electorates where the preliminary results indicated success for National Party newcomers (Blair Cameron and Angee Nicholas) reverted to the Labour Party incumbents (Rachel Boyack and Phil Twyford). This meant that two other Labour candidates (Tracey McLellan and Shanan Halbert) who, based on preliminary results had gained list seats, were ultimately unsuccessful. Recounts were requested for three electorates and they were completed by 15 November, with the outcomes not changing. With National having lost two new MPs, and Te Pāti Māori and the Greens having gained two and one new MPs, respectively, the number of new MPs increased to 41.

The 2023 general election finished with the 2023 Port Waikato by-election, which was won by Andrew Bayly. As Bayly had previously been confirmed as a list MP, this gained the National Party another list MP (Nancy Lu – a first-time MP). The situation also created an additional overhang seat, with parliament now having 123 seats and 42 new MPs, meaning that one-third of the members are newcomers. As Lu's return to parliament was practically confirmed due to Bayly's strong position, she was part of the induction process for new MPs in early November.

National	Labour	Green	ACT	Te Pāti Māori	NZ First
Carlos Cheung (Mt Roskill)	Cushla Tangaere-Manuel (Ikaroa-Rawhiti)	Lan Pham (list)	Andrew Hoggard (list)	Hana-Rawhiti Maipi-Clarke (Hauraki-Waikato)	Casey Costello (list)
Tim Costley (Ōtaki)	Reuben Davidson (Christchurch East)	Hūhana Lyndon (list)	Todd Stephenson (list)	Tākuta Ferris (Te Tai Tonga)	Jamie Arbuckle (list)
Grant McCallum (Northland)		Steve Abel (list)	Laura Trask (list)	Takutai Tarsh Kemp (Tamaki Makāurau)	Andy Foster (list)
Suze Redmayne (Rangitikei)		Efeso Collins (list)	Cameron Luxton (list)	Mariameno Kapa-Kingi (Te Tai Tokerau)	Tanya Unkovich (list)
Dana Kirkpatrick (East Coast)		Scott Willis (list)			
Catherine Wedd (Tukituki)		Darleen Tana (list)			
Hamish Campbell (Ilam)		Kahurangi Carter (list)			
Ryan Hamilton (Hamilton East)		Tamatha Paul (Wellington Central)			
James Meager (Rangitata)					
Greg Fleming (Maungakiekie)					
Cameron Brewer (Upper Harbour)					
Vanessa Weenink (Banks Peninsula)					
Mike Butterick (Wairarapa)					
Katie Nimon (Napier)					
Tom Rutherford (Bay of Plenty)					
David MacLeod (New Plymouth)					
Miles Anderson (Waitaki)					
Carl Bates (Whanganui)					
Rima Nakhle (Takanini)					
Nancy Lu (list)					

=== Voter turnout ===
Overall turnout for the general election was 78.2%. This is down from the turnout of 82.2% in the 2020 general election. Turnout among Māori was 70.3%, down from 72.9% in the 2020 general election.

On 21 October, Stuff reported that voter turnout in New Zealand prisons were low, citing data released by the Electoral Commission. Under the New Zealand law, prisoners on remand or serving prison sentences less than three years (totalling 5,593 individuals) are eligible to vote. At Invercargill Prison, 16 prisoners on the general roll voted for Labour, three for National, three for ACT, one for NZ First, and one for NZ Loyal. At the Otago Corrections Facility, 9 voted for Labour, one for National, and one for the Aotearoa Legalise Cannabis Party (ALCP). In Waikeria Prison, four voted for Labour, two for National, one for NZ First, and one for the Leighton Baker Party.

Stuff also surveyed the voting behaviour of prisoners on the Māori roll from the Auckland Region Women's Corrections Facility, the Serco-run Auckland South Corrections Facility, Arohata Prison, and Invercargill Prison. Eight prisoners at Auckland Regional prison voted for Labour, one for the ALCP, and one for Te Pāti Māori (TPM). At the Auckland South Corrections Facility, Labour received six votes, TPM two votes, and ALCP one vote. At Arohata Prison, five voted for Labour and three for TPM. At Invercargil Prison, seven prisoners on the Māori roll voted for Labour, two for ALCP, two for NZ First, two for TPM, and one for National.

== Post-election events ==
On 16 November, following the completion of the judicial recounts, the writ was returned to the Clerk of the House of Representatives, along with the declaration of MPs elected from party lists.

Per Section 19 of the Constitution Act 1986, the latest possible date for the first meeting of the 54th Parliament is 28 December (six weeks following the return of the writ).

=== Resignations of members ===
On 17 October 2023, Labour's Andrew Little announced his retirement from politics, and his resignation took effect on 5 December. Since Little did not hold an electorate seat, his list position of 12th was enough to get him into parliament. Following Little's resignation, Camilla Belich was declared elected as an MP on 6 December.

=== 2023 Port Waikato by-election ===
The electorate contest in Port Waikato was cancelled because the ACT New Zealand candidate died during the general election voting period. A by-election to fill this vacancy was held on 25 November 2023. Andrew Bayly was elected as the MP switching from a list MP to an electorate MP. This allowed National to gain one extra List MP with Nancy Lu becoming the 123rd MP in addition to the 122 already elected.

=== Local body by-elections ===
Three local government by-elections have been called as a result of incumbent local body politicians resigning from their previous roles due to their election to Parliament.

- East ward by-election, Hamilton City Council: Hamilton City councillor and incoming Hamilton East MP Ryan Hamilton resigned immediately after the general election. Voting in the by-election for the council's East ward closed on 17 February 2024.
- Banks Peninsula community board by-election, Christchurch City Council: Christchurch City Council community board member and incoming Christchurch East MP Reuben Davidson resigned in late October. Voting in the council's Banks Peninsula community board by-election closed on 17 February 2024.
- Pukehīnau Lambton ward by-election, Wellington City Council: Wellington City councillor and incoming Wellington Central MP Tamatha Paul served her last day as a councillor on 10 November. Voting in the council's Pukehīnau Lambton ward by-election closed on 17 February 2024.

Marlborough District councillor and incoming New Zealand First list MP Jamie Arbuckle told media after the election he would not resign from his council position until October 2024, by which point a by-election would not be required due to the proximity of the 2025 local elections.

=== Ethnic representation ===
In late October 2023, Radio New Zealand reported that Pasifika New Zealanders were under-represented in the incoming Sixth National Government. While the outgoing Labour Government had 12 Pasifika MPs over the previous two terms, National's two Pasifika candidates Angee Nicholas and Agnes Loheni, were based in marginal seats or ranked too low on the party list to be elected into Parliament. Following the release of final results on 3 November, Nicholas lost her Te Atatū electorate to Labour's Phil Twyford by a margin of 131 votes whilst Loheni was ranked too low on the list, (25), to get into parliament. As a result, the incoming National-led government lacked a single Pasifika MP.

=== Vote counting errors ===
On 7 November 2023, The New Zealand Herald reported that three booths in the Port Waikato and Ilam electorates had mistakenly assigned hundreds of votes to the Leighton Baker Party and the New Conservatives Party. This affected votes which had been cast for the National, Labour, Greens, NZ First parties and Te Pāti Māori. The Electoral Commission subsequently admitted that a data entry error had resulted in this mistake. The Commission also launched a full check of all voting place results to investigate if there were more transcription errors.

On 9 November, the Electoral Commission admitted that 15 voting places had data entry errors, and that more than 700 votes were left off the final vote announced on 3 November. The Commission also said that the final checks of party, electorate and special votes had not affected overall results or allocation of seats in Parliament. Due to these corrections, 693 extra party votes and 708 candidate votes were included in the overall result. The overall turnout for the 2023 election remained at 78.2%.

In response to several reported incidents of vote counting errors at polling booths, the Auditor General John Ryan commenced a review into various aspects of the quality assurance processes for the vote count during the 2023 general election. On 7 May 2024, the Auditor-General Ryan's investigation found that the final check of the official election hours had been done in a few hours under extreme pressure on the day of its official announcement on 3 November 2023; which would normally take two days. This rushed assessment failed to identify multiple errors in the official results. Ryan also found that several apparent dual votes had been included in the official count. He made several recommendations to the Electoral Commission including reviewing vote counting procedures, the staff recruitment process, hardware requirements and information technology systems.

=== Judicial recounts ===
On 8 November 2023, the District Court of New Zealand received three applications for judicial recounts of 2023 election results in three marginal electorates. Labour sought a judicial recount for Tāmaki Makaurau where their candidate Peeni Henare had been unseated by Māori Party candidate Takutai Tarsh Kemp by a margin of four votes. In addition, National sought judicial recounts for Nelson and Mount Albert, where their candidates Blair Cameron and Melissa Lee trailed close behind their respective Labour candidates after the final count, by 29 and 20 votes respectively.

On 10 November, the Electoral Commission confirmed that Labour MP Rachel Boyack had retained Nelson by a margin of 26 votes, three votes smaller than the final vote results on 3 November. On 15 November, the Electoral Commission confirmed that Helen White had retained Mount Albert for Labour by 18 votes (two fewer than the final vote results) and that Takutai Tarsh Kemp had unseated Peeni Henare in Tāmaki Makaurau by 42 votes (38 more than the final vote results).

=== Alleged treating ===
On 9 November, the Electoral Commission confirmed that it was investigating allegations that food was served to voters at Manurewa Marae in the Tāmaki Makaurau electorate. Under New Zealand electoral law, serving food to voters in order to influence their vote is illegal and considered a form of treating. Te Pāti Māori candidate Takutai Tarsh Kemp, who eventually won the election, was the CEO of Manurewa Marae at the time. Te Pāti Māori president John Tamihere rejected allegations that food was served to voters to influence their votes, describing them as "innuendo" and "without evidence."

=== Data breach allegations ===
On 2 June 2024, Stuff journalist Andrea Vance reported that Statistics New Zealand was investigating several allegations by former staff at Manurewa Marae that Te Pāti Māori had illegally used 2023 New Zealand census data to target Māori electorate voters in the Tāmaki Makaurau electorate during the 2023 election, and that participants were given supermarket vouchers, wellness packs and food parcels to encourage them to fill out census forms and switch to the Māori electoral roll. The party's candidate Takutai Tarsh Kemp had won Tāmaki Makaurau during the 2023 election. A whistleblower from the Ministry of Social Development had alerted Statistics NZ and the Police. In response, Te Pāti Māori leader John Tamihere denied the allegations and claimed that they were made by disgruntled complainants. Tamihere said that the marae had been working with the Whānau Ora Commissioning Agency to promote Māori participation in the 2023 census. Tamihere also acknowledged that marae workers had given gifts to encourage people to participate in the 2023 census and switch to the Māori roll.

On 5 June, Vance reported that the Labour Party had filed a complaint against Te Pāti Māori in November 2023 for allegedly using personal information collected during the COVID-19 immunisation programme for political campaigning purposes during the 2023 election, which is illegal under New Zealand electoral law. Labour's complaint alleged that Māori voters in Auckland had received two text messages from the text code 2661 urging them to vote for Te Pāti Māori. 2661 was registered with the Waipareira Trust, which is led by Tamihere. In response, Labour leader Chris Hipkins, ACT leader David Seymour, and prime minister Christopher Luxon called for an investigation into the data breach allegations. The Privacy Commissioner also confirmed that Statistics NZ had alerted it to a potential privacy breach during its investigation. Chief statistician Mark Sowden called for anyone with information to contact Statistics NZ. In response to the second allegations, Tamihere denounced the allegations as baseless and alleged that the party was being smeared by opponents for speaking up for Māori. Tamihere also accused Destiny Church leader Brian Tamaki and his followers of attempting to take over Manurewa Marae.

On 7 June, Te Pāti Māori co-leaders Rawiri Waititi and Debbie Ngarewa-Packer called for an urgent Police investigation into the data breach allegations made against Te Pāti Māori. Police confirmed they were already investigating complaints they had received. That same day, acting Public Service Commissioner Heather Baggott convened a meeting with the heads of Statistics New Zealand, the Ministry of Health, Te Whatu Ora, the Ministry of Social Development, the Ministry of Justice, the Department of Internal Affairs, Te Puni Kōkiri, Oranga Tamariki, the Department of the Prime Minister and Cabinet, the Police and Electoral Commission to ensure that all relevant agencies were investigating the data breach allegations

On 27 August 2024, former academic Rawiri Taonui asserted that the whistleblowers connected to Destiny Church had made the allegations against Manurewa Marae and Te Pāti Māori following a failed attempt by the church to take over the marae. On 22 January 2025, a Statistics New Zealand report cleared the Whanau Ora Commissioning Agency of data breaches during the 2023 New Zealand census, finding that the agency increased Māori participation. The report made nine recommendations to improve Statistics NZ's procedures and referred allegations against Manurewa Marae to the Privacy Commissioner. The report also found no evidence that one of the alleged whistleblowers had attempted to contact Statistics NZ regarding allegations against the marae.

On 11 February 2025, The New Zealand Herald reported that Detective Superintendent Ross McKay was leading an inquiry into allegations regarding Te Pāti Māori's misuse of census data and Covid-19 vaccination information at Manurewa Marae for electoral campaigning purposes. On 2 October, the Police and Serious Fraud Office (SFO) halted their investigation into the Manurewa Marae electoral misconduct allegations after they found insufficient evidence of corruption. The SFO and Privacy Commissioner are still investigating potential privacy breaches.

=== Alleged election advertising breach ===
In late June 2024, the Electoral Commission referred Green MP Darleen Tana and the publishers of Verve Magazine to Police for allegedly failing to include a promoter statement in an election advertisement published in May 2023. Tana had earlier been suspended by her party over her knowledge and involvement in alleged migrant exploitation by her husband's bike company.

== Reactions ==
=== Domestic ===
Hipkins conceded to Luxon on election night and congratulated Luxon for his victory.

Veteran TVNZ broadcaster John Campbell described Labour's failure as being rooted in the party's refusal to back a capital gains tax, which he blamed on "what appears to have been truly useless focus group information", their decision not to fully implement any recommendations advised by the official Welfare Expert Advisory Group ahead of the election, and a sense of self-assurance that the election was "unloseable", leading to an "inexplicably lifeless" campaign. He noted that out of the 1.06 million eligible voters who did not vote, most statistically were renters from the youngest demographics, and claimed that National had efficiently mobilised support for landlords in a way Labour had failed to do for tenants. Campbell also pointed that the enrolment rate in the country's wealthiest electorate, the safe ACT seat of Epsom for 18-to-24 year olds was 85%, compared to a mere 46% in the safe Labour seat of Māngere. Campbell concluded: "Labour couldn't mobilise young people in the country's poorest electorates to do the same thing [that National did with landlords]. That's on Labour. And it's a terrible failure".

=== International ===
Australia's prime minister Anthony Albanese congratulated Luxon on his victory and thanked Hipkins for his service, describing Hipkins as his friend. Opposition Leader and Liberal Party of Australia (the main centre-right, liberal conservative party) leader Peter Dutton also congratulated Luxon for his victory. Cook Islands' prime minister Mark Brown called Luxon to congratulate him for his victory. India's prime minister Narendra Modi congratulated Luxon for his party's win. Singapore's prime minister Lee Hsien-Loong congratulated Luxon for his victory. Ukraine's president Volodymyr Zelenskyy thanked Hipkins for his support for Ukraine and congratulated Luxon on his victory. Elon Musk congratulated Luxon. Following his election in November 2023, United Kingdom's prime minister Rishi Sunak congratulated Luxon.

== Government formation ==
Following the release of preliminary results on 14 October, National began coalition negotiations with both ACT and New Zealand First. Christopher Luxon stated that he would be conducting these negotiations privately and would not confirm his stance on policies such as ACT's proposed referendum on Māori co-governance. Following the release of final results on 3 November, National's seat count dropped from 50 to 48, depriving a two-party arrangement between National and ACT of the 62 seats needed for a majority government, thus making the support of New Zealand First necessary to command a parliamentary majority.

On 8 November, ACT and NZ First made first contact in their coalition talks during a meeting between ACT's chief of staff Andrew Ketels and NZ First's chief of staff Darroch Ball. This introductory meeting was meant "to establish a line of communication" between the two parties. In addition, the National and NZ First parties conducted high-level negotiation talks in Wellington that same week. Following the release of final results, ACT leader David Seymour attempted to contact NZ First leader Peters via text message but he had mistaken it for a scam. On 9 November, Seymour expressed hope that coalition negotiations and government formation would be completed before an upcoming APEC meeting in mid-November 2023.

Amidst coalition talks, the outgoing Labour Government remained in a caretaker capacity. On 10 November, Hipkins and Luxon agreed to advise Governor-General Cindy Kiro to prolong the caretaker government arrangement until the conclusion of coalition talks.

On 13 November, Luxon said it was unlikely he would go to APEC due to prioritising a government coalition.

On 15 November, Luxon, Seymour and Peters met at Pullman Hotel's boardroom in Auckland. It was the first time the three leaders had met since the election.

On 20 November, Luxon confirmed that National had reached an agreement on policy positions with ACT and New Zealand First. In response to Luxon's announcement, Peters stated that it was an "assumption" to state that a policy agreement had been reached. In addition, Seymour said "that Luxon had maybe had too many Weet-Bix that day." Seymour also opined that ACT as the second largest party in the coalition should hold the position of Deputy Prime Minister and have more ministerial portfolios than NZ First. That same day, the three parties entered into talks about allocating cabinet ministerial positions. On 21 November, Luxon met with Seymour to discuss ministerial portfolios.

Coalition negotiations between the three parties concluded on the afternoon of 23 November. That same day Luxon, Seymour and Peters met in Wellington to finalise the agreement between National, ACT, and NZ First. The terms of the coalition agreement were unveiled on 24 November 2023.

== See also ==
- Elections in New Zealand
