= Takanini (electorate) =

- Single-member general constituency for the New Zealand House of Representatives
- Interactive map of boundaries from the 2026 election
- Formation: 2020
- Region: Auckland
- Character: Suburban
- Term: 3 years

Member for Takanini
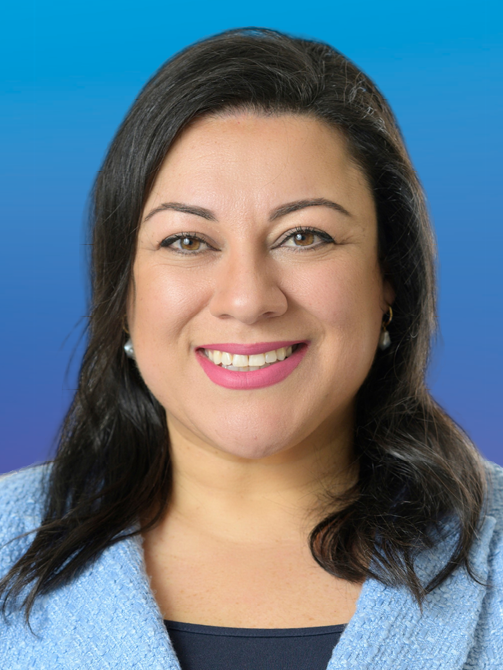
- Rima Nakhle since 14 October 2023
- Party: National
- Previous MP: Neru Leavasa (Labour)
Party vote distribution

Takanini is an electorate to the New Zealand House of Representatives. It is located in South Auckland and was first created for the 2020 New Zealand general election. Rima Nakhle is the sitting Member of Parliament.

== Population centres ==
Map of boundaries at the 2020 and 2023 general elections

The electorate is located in the far south of Auckland, on the edge of the city's built-up area. It stretches from Wattle Downs in its southwest to Mission Heights in the north. It was created out of eastern parts of the Manurewa electorate around Goodwood Heights and Greenmeadows, a small part of northeastern Hunua around Mission Heights, and a northern section of the Papakura electorate around Takanini and Wattle Downs. This was due to rapid population growth in the area caused mainly by the outward expansion of Auckland. Continued population growth in South Auckland saw the electorate 17.7% over quota – the highest in the country – and saw the electorate lose Mission Heights to Botany, part of Takanini to Papakura, part of Wattle Downs to Manurewa and Clover Park to Otahuhu.

== Electorate profile ==
South Auckland has traditionally been a stronghold for the Labour Party. Takanini, however, was considered to be a marginal seat between Labour and National, as it takes in both Labour-leaning areas and National-leaning areas. Initially, the electorate's name was proposed as Flat Bush after the Auckland suburb in the north of the electorate. After a public consultation period, the name was changed to Takanini after a suburb in the south of the electorate.

== Members of Parliament ==
Labour National

Election	Winner
2020 election	Neru Leavasa
2023 election	Rima Nakhle

== Election results ==
=== 2026 election ===
The next election will be held on 7 November 2026. Candidates for Takanini are listed at Candidates in the 2026 New Zealand general election by electorate § Takanini. Official results will be available after 27 November 2026.

=== 2023 election ===
2023 general election: Takanini
Notes:	Blue background denotes the winner of the electorate vote. Pink background denotes a candidate elected from their party list. Yellow background denotes an electorate win by a list member, or other incumbent. A ✓ or ✗ denotes status of any incumbent, win or lose respectively.						
Party	Candidate	Votes	%	±%	Party votes	%	±%
National	Rima Nakhle	21,936	55.95	+23.60	21,056	52.56	+22.74
Labour	✗ Neru Leavasa	13,161	33.57	−20.13	11,181	27.91	−26.61
ACT	Rae Ah Chee	2,037	5.20	+1.59	2,202	5.50	−0.38
Animal Justice	Lynley Tulloch	736	1.88	–	82	0.20	–
Green					2,277	5.68	+2.40
NZ First					1,267	3.16	+1.20
Te Pāti Māori					440	1.10	+0.66
Opportunities					333	0.83	+0.24
NewZeal					299	0.75	—
Freedoms NZ					208	0.52	–
NZ Loyal					135	0.34	–
Legalise Cannabis					108	0.27	+0.01
New Conservative					68	0.17	−1.51
DemocracyNZ					32	0.08	
Women's Rights					25	0.06	
Leighton Baker Party					16	0.04	
New Nation					14	0.03	
Informal votes		1,332			320		
Total valid votes		39,202			40,063		
Turnout							
National gain from Labour	Majority	8,775	22.38	—			

=== 2020 election ===
2020 general election: Takanini
Notes:	Blue background denotes the winner of the electorate vote. Pink background denotes a candidate elected from their party list. Yellow background denotes an electorate win by a list member, or other incumbent. A ✓ or ✗ denotes status of any incumbent, win or lose respectively.						
Party	Candidate	Votes	%	±%	Party votes	%	±%
Labour	Neru Leavasa	19,431	53.70	—	20,022	54.52	—
National	Rima Nakhle	11,707	32.35	—	10,952	29.82	—
ACT	Mike McCormick	1,307	3.61	—	1,688	4.59	—
New Conservative	Elliot Ikilei	939	2.59	—	618	1.68	—
TEA	John Hong	902	2.49	—	211	0.57	—
Vision NZ	George Ngatai	361	0.99	—	183	0.49	—
Advance NZ	Mit Kagathra	215	0.59	—	223	0.60	—
Green					1,206	3.28	—
NZ First					722	1.96	—
Opportunities					219	0.59	—
Māori Party					162	0.44	—
Legalise Cannabis					97	0.26	—
ONE					69	0.18	—
Outdoors					15	0.04	—
Sustainable NZ					13	0.03	—
Heartland					3	0.01	—
Social Credit					2	0.01	—
Informal votes		1,321			318		
Total valid votes		36,183			36,723		
Turnout		36,723					
Labour win new seat	Majority	7,724	21.35				
