= Results of the 2023 New Zealand general election =

Map of the 2023 New Zealand general election, shaded by electorate. Māori electorates are in the bottom right.

This article summarises results of the 14 October 2023 New Zealand general election, including both party vote and electorate vote outcomes.

== Release of results ==
Preliminary results were released gradually after polling booths closed at 19:00 (NZDT) on 14 October. The preliminary count only includes advance ordinary and election day ordinary votes; it does not include any special votes, which have a deadline ten days later (24 October). Special votes include votes from those who enrolled after the deadline of 10 September, those who voted outside their electorate (including all overseas votes), voters in hospital or prison, and those voters enrolled on the unpublished roll.

== Party vote ==
=== Overall results ===
Party vote percentage
1. National (38.1%)
2. Labour (26.9%)
3. Green (11.6%)
4. ACT (8.64%)
5. NZ First (6.08%)
6. Māori (3.08%)
7. Opportunities (2.22%)
8. Loyal (1.20%)
9. Other (2.21%)

Map of the plurality party vote in each electorate

Map of party vote by left/right bloc split

Summary of the 14 October 2023 election for the House of Representatives
Party	Party vote				Electorate vote sum				Total seats	+/-
Party	Votes	Of total (%)	Change (pp)	Seats	Votes	Of total (%)	Change (pp)	Seats	Total seats	+/-
National	1,085,851	38.08	▲12.51	5	1,192,251	43.47	▲9.34	43	48	▲16
Labour	767,540	26.92	▼23.09	17	855,963	31.21	▼16.86	17	34	▼31
Green	330,907	11.61	▲3.75	12	226,575	8.26	▲2.52	3	15	▲5
ACT	246,473	8.64	▲1.06	9	149,507	5.45	▲1.99	2	11	▲1
NZ First	173,553	6.09	▲3.49	8	76,676	2.80	▲1.73	0	8	▲8
Te Pāti Māori	87,844	3.08	▲1.92	0	106,584	3.89	▲1.73	6	6	▲4
Opportunities (TOP)	63,344	2.22	▲0.72	0	27,975	1.02	▲0.13	0	0	Steady
NZ Loyal	34,478	1.20	new	0	32,240	1.18	new	0	0	new
NewZeal (Note: Formerly known as ONE Party.)	16,126	0.56	▲0.28	0	3,585	0.13	▼0.11	0	0	Steady
Legalise Cannabis	13,025	0.45	0.00	0	12,566	0.46	▲0.17	0	0	Steady
Freedoms NZ (Note: A coalition consisting of the Freedom and Rights Coalition, Vision NZ, the NZ Outdoors & Freedom Party, and a few other unregistered parties.)	9,586	0.33	▲0.08	0				0	0	Steady
DemocracyNZ	6,786	0.23	new	0	12,060	0.44	new	0	0	new
Animal Justice	5,018	0.17	new	0	5,829	0.21	new	0	0	new
New Conservative	4,532	0.15	▼1.32	0	3,167	0.12	▼1.64	0	0	Steady
Women's Rights	2,513	0.08	new	0	0	0.00	new	0	0	new
Leighton Baker Party	2,105	0.07	new	0	2,623	0.10	new	0	0	new
New Nation	1,530	0.05	new	0	433	0.02	new	0	0	new
Unregistered parties										
Independent					34,277	1.25	▲0.87			
Valid votes	2,851,211				2,742,677					
Informal votes	16,267				40,353					
Disallowed votes	16,633				59,043					
Below electoral threshold										
Total	2,884,111	100.00		51	2,842,073	100.00		71	122	
Eligible voters and turnout	3,688,292	78.20	▼4.04		3,688,292	77.06	▼5.18			

=== By electorate ===
The following is a breakdown of the party vote received in each electorate, for parties receiving at least 1% of the nationwide party vote.

Electorate	National	Labour	Green	ACT	NZ First	Māori	TOP	Loyal
Auckland Central	33.22	22.69	24.03	9.33	3.82	1.59	3.53	0.61
Banks Peninsula	31.96	26.63	19.70	7.91	5.36	0.78	4.84	0.78
Bay of Plenty	47.20	17.39	8.00	11.47	8.71	1.27	1.97	1.57
Botany	59.04	20.46	5.87	7.40	3.02	0.50	1.17	0.74
Christchurch Central	31.25	28.61	19.52	6.67	5.22	1.02	5.14	0.64
Christchurch East	28.71	34.37	14.53	7.14	6.85	1.06	3.43	1.03
Coromandel	43.09	19.67	7.83	11.92	10.44	0.77	1.09	3.37
Dunedin	22.71	30.96	26.93	5.79	5.64	1.44	4.26	0.95
East Coast	36.86	29.96	7.45	8.91	9.67	2.29	1.14	1.35
East Coast Bays	57.80	14.68	8.89	9.69	3.93	0.35	1.66	0.99
Epsom	51.69	14.67	13.59	12.44	2.61	0.74	3.22	0.30
Hamilton East	42.85	24.85	12.35	8.07	5.01	1.48	2.72	0.89
Hamilton West	41.37	26.44	9.97	8.77	6.22	1.84	2.50	0.83
Hutt South	34.05	32.47	15.51	5.75	5.20	1.34	3.34	0.75
Ilam	43.15	21.97	14.97	8.32	4.04	0.62	5.00	0.35
Invercargill	42.85	25.64	6.23	10.61	7.43	0.74	1.29	2.94
Kaikōura	41.21	20.78	7.83	14.09	9.11	0.51	1.68	2.03
Kaipara ki Mahurangi	47.78	17.02	9.60	12.11	6.67	0.68	1.84	1.76
Kelston	31.24	37.28	14.09	5.95	4.73	1.77	1.94	0.71
Mana	28.83	38.21	15.02	5.37	5.28	1.89	2.76	0.72
Māngere	19.25	61.40	7.85	2.12	3.31	2.14	0.93	0.32
Manurewa	29.41	52.17	5.93	2.69	3.46	2.11	0.60	0.46
Maungakiekie	41.61	27.31	13.83	7.98	3.84	0.94	2.65	0.44
Mount Albert	32.05	26.07	25.30	6.76	3.08	1.61	3.72	0.37
Mount Roskill	43.40	30.04	12.12	6.11	3.55	0.79	2.10	0.36
Napier	41.00	26.59	8.55	11.08	6.87	0.93	1.53	1.26
Nelson	32.45	29.32	14.41	10.37	6.12	0.80	2.48	1.50
New Lynn	37.31	26.90	16.74	7.77	4.93	1.23	2.20	1.11
New Plymouth	42.18	24.19	8.51	10.16	7.26	1.43	1.96	2.18
North Shore	50.92	17.70	11.73	10.98	3.88	0.50	2.55	0.51
Northcote	43.67	23.19	14.27	8.70	4.22	0.76	3.11	0.56
Northland	35.44	22.04	8.00	10.21	14.08	1.55	1.25	3.30
Ōhariu	34.60	29.04	20.10	5.88	3.36	1.21	4.39	0.26
Ōtaki	37.31	30.96	10.62	7.47	7.76	1.15	1.56	1.44
Pakuranga	58.74	16.65	7.20	9.89	3.80	0.50	1.44	0.64
Palmerston North	33.99	31.48	12.41	8.28	6.25	1.74	2.29	1.22
Panmure-Ōtāhuhu	26.55	52.70	8.55	3.62	3.29	1.35	1.21	0.41
Papakura	51.95	20.96	6.39	10.05	5.27	1.06	1.28	0.99
Port Waikato	48.96	18.67	5.86	12.05	7.25	0.92	1.16	1.29
Rangitata	44.90	26.35	5.81	10.09	7.44	0.39	1.29	1.45
Rangitīkei	41.23	21.79	7.42	13.70	9.13	1.40	1.53	1.51
Remutaka	30.49	38.34	12.14	5.93	5.85	1.22	2.75	0.63
Rongotai	21.33	31.35	32.06	3.94	3.31	2.36	4.21	0.30
Rotorua	41.60	24.23	7.84	9.62	7.70	2.31	1.73	1.68
Selwyn	49.39	18.15	8.95	12.15	5.43	0.48	2.70	0.89
Southland	48.43	16.49	8.77	13.64	5.69	0.48	2.04	2.45
Taieri	33.62	34.33	10.84	7.92	7.71	0.58	2.20	1.13
Takanini	52.98	28.13	5.73	5.54	3.19	1.11	0.84	0.34
Tāmaki	52.58	16.82	10.99	12.41	2.87	0.69	2.35	0.40
Taranaki-King Country	47.22	17.20	6.93	13.43	8.32	1.21	1.58	1.96
Taupō	45.52	22.08	6.32	11.31	8.00	1.29	1.47	2.19
Tauranga	46.11	18.27	8.98	10.66	8.95	1.05	2.23	1.12
Te Atatū	37.82	33.56	11.31	6.50	4.53	1.58	1.62	0.76
Tukituki	41.54	25.45	7.95	12.38	6.17	0.99	1.42	1.50
Upper Harbour	50.24	22.62	9.40	8.46	4.06	0.80	2.15	0.67
Waikato	50.41	17.64	5.51	12.27	7.69	0.96	1.72	1.67
Waimakariri	42.74	24.22	8.55	10.58	7.03	0.51	2.21	0.94
Wairarapa	38.94	27.36	8.23	10.64	8.18	1.02	1.58	2.30
Waitaki	43.43	21.57	9.04	12.33	6.99	0.41	1.97	2.03
Wellington Central	21.49	24.94	37.79	4.52	2.24	2.41	5.53	0.17
West Coast-Tasman	33.45	23.75	10.77	13.08	9.90	0.69	1.89	3.55
Whanganui	37.00	27.95	7.57	9.52	11.42	1.53	1.18	1.38
Whangaparāoa	53.21	15.27	7.60	11.93	6.26	0.47	1.63	1.34
Whangārei	37.93	22.37	9.40	9.12	13.09	1.36	1.68	2.09
Wigram	35.39	29.71	14.88	6.51	5.08	0.83	4.71	0.67
Hauraki-Waikato	5.02	44.68	7.35	1.14	3.78	33.01	0.72	1.20
Ikaroa-Rāwhiti	3.63	55.66	6.78	0.78	3.51	25.37	0.53	0.98
Tāmaki Makaurau	4.76	43.39	12.11	0.95	3.48	30.17	0.93	0.65
Te Tai Hauāuru	4.54	41.29	7.93	1.05	4.24	36.15	0.69	1.28
Te Tai Tokerau	5.43	44.44	9.59	1.08	6.73	27.01	0.74	1.41
Te Tai Tonga	8.73	36.99	16.38	2.34	5.54	22.94	1.95	1.68
Waiariki	3.40	43.72	5.55	0.75	3.76	38.32	0.54	0.82

== Electorate results ==
Party affiliation of winning electorate candidates.

The table below shows the official results of the electorate vote in the 2023 general election:

Key

Labour
National
Green
ACT
Te Pāti Māori
NZ First
Opportunities
Vision NZ
Legalise Cannabis
Outdoors
Independent

Electorate results of the 2023 New Zealand general election
Electorate	Incumbent	Winner	Majority	Runner up	Third place
Auckland Central	Chlöe Swarbrick		3,896	Mahesh Muralidhar	Oscar Sims
Banks Peninsula	Tracey McLellan	Vanessa Weenink	396	Tracey McLellan	Lan Pham
Bay of Plenty	Todd Muller	Tom Rutherford	15,405	Pare Taikato	Cameron Luxton
Botany	Christopher Luxon		16,337	Kharag Singh	Bo Burns
Christchurch Central	Duncan Webb		1,981	Dale Stephens	Kahurangi Carter
Christchurch East	Poto Williams	Reuben Davidson	2,397	Matt Stock	Sahra Ahmed
Coromandel	Scott Simpson		17,014	Beryl Riley	Pamela Grealey
Dunedin	David Clark	Rachel Brooking	7,980	Michael Woodhouse	Francisco Hernandez
East Coast	Kiri Allan	Dana Kirkpatrick	3,117	Tāmati Coffey	Craig Sinclair
East Coast Bays	Erica Stanford		20,353	Naisi Chen	Michael McCook
Epsom	David Seymour		8,142	Paul Goldsmith	Camilla Belich
Hamilton East	Jamie Strange	Ryan Hamilton	5,060	Georgie Dansey	Himanshu Parmar
Hamilton West	Tama Potaka		6,488	Myra Williamson	Benjamin Doyle
Hutt South	Ginny Andersen	Chris Bishop	1,332	Ginny Andersen	Neelu Jennings
Ilam	Sarah Pallett	Hamish Campbell	7,830	Raf Manji	Sarah Pallett
Invercargill	Penny Simmonds		9,874	Liz Craig	Scott Ian Donaldson
Kaikōura	Stuart Smith		11,412	Emma Dewhirst	Jamie Arbuckle
Kaipara ki Mahurangi	Chris Penk		19,459	Guy Wishart	Zephyr Brown
Kelston	Carmel Sepuloni		4,396	Ruby Schaumkel	Golriz Ghahraman
Mana	Barbara Edmonds		7,372	Frances Hughes	Gina Dao-Mclay
Māngere	William Sio	Lemauga Lydia Sosene	11,700	Rosemary Burke	Peter Sykes
Manurewa	Arena Williams		7,113	Siva Kilari	Rangi McLean
Maungakiekie	Priyanca Radhakrishnan	Greg Fleming	4,617	Priyanca Radhakrishnan	Sapna Samant
Mount Albert	Jacinda Ardern	Helen White	18	Melissa Lee	Ricardo Menéndez March
Mount Roskill	Michael Wood	Carlos Cheung	1,565	Michael Wood	Suveen Sanis Walgampola
Napier	Stuart Nash	Katie Nimon	8,870	Mark Hutchinson	Julienne Dickey
Nelson	Rachel Boyack		26	Blair Cameron	Jace Hobbs
New Lynn	Deborah Russell	Paulo Garcia	1,013	Deborah Russell	Steve Abel
New Plymouth	Glen Bennett	David MacLeod	6,991	Glen Bennett	Bruce McGechan
North Shore	Simon Watts		16,330	George Hampton	Pat Baskett
Northcote	Shanan Halbert	Dan Bidois	9,270	Shanan Halbert	Andrew Shaw
Northland	Willow-Jean Prime	Grant McCallum	6,087	Willow-Jean Prime	Shane Jones
Ōhāriu	Greg O'Connor		1,260	Nicola Willis	Stephanie Rodgers
Ōtaki	Terisa Ngobi	Tim Costley	6,271	Terisa Ngobi	Ali Muhammad
Pakuranga	Simeon Brown		18,710	Nerissa Henry	Parmjeet Parmar
Palmerston North	Tangi Utikere		3,087	Ankit Bansal	Teanau Tuiono
Panmure-Ōtāhuhu	Jenny Salesa		7,970	Navtej Randhawa	Efeso Collins
Papakura	Judith Collins		13,459	Anahila Kanongata'a-Suisuiki	Mike McCormack
Port Waikato	Electorate vote cancelled as a result of candidate death				
Rangitata	Jo Luxton	James Meager	10,846	Jo Luxton	Robert Ballantyne
Rangitīkei	Ian McKelvie	Suze Redmayne	9,785	Zulfiqar Butt	Andrew Hoggard
Remutaka	Chris Hipkins		8,859	Emma Chatterton	Chris Norton
Rongotai	Paul Eagle	Julie Anne Genter	2,717	Fleur Fitzsimons	Karunā Muthu
Rotorua	Todd McClay		8,923	Ben Sandford	Merepeka Raukawa-Tait
Selwyn	Nicola Grigg		19,782	Luke Jones	Ben Harvey
Southland	Joseph Mooney		17,211	Simon McCallum	Dave Kennedy
Taieri	Ingrid Leary		1,443	Matthew French	Scott Willis
Takanini	Neru Leavasa	Rima Nakhle	8,775	Neru Leavasa	Rae Ah Chee
Tāmaki	Simon O'Connor	Brooke van Velden	4,158	Simon O'Connor	Fesaitu Solomone
Taranaki-King Country	Barbara Kuriger		14,355	Angela Roberts	Bill Burr
Taupō	Louise Upston		16,505	Aladdin Al-Bustanji	George O'Connor-Patena
Tauranga	Sam Uffindell		9,370	Jan Tinetti	Christine Young
Te Atatū	Phil Twyford		131	Angee Nicholas	Zooey Neumann
Tukituki	Anna Lorck	Catherine Wedd	10,118	Anna Lorck	Nick Ratcliffe
Upper Harbour	Vanushi Walters	Cameron Brewer	11,192	Vanushi Walters	Thea Doyle
Waikato	Tim van de Molen		18,046	Jamie Toko	Stuart Husband
Waimakariri	Matt Doocey		13,010	Dan Rosewarne	Ross Eric Campbell
Wairarapa	Kieran McAnulty	Mike Butterick	2,816	Kieran McAnulty	Simon Francis Casey
Waitaki	Jacqui Dean	Miles Anderson	12,151	Ethan Reille	Pleasance Hansen
Wellington Central	Grant Robertson	Tamatha Paul	6,066	Ibrahim Omer	Scott Sheeran
West Coast-Tasman	Damien O'Connor	Maureen Pugh	1,017	Damien O'Connor	Patrick Sean Phelps
Whanganui	Steph Lewis	Carl Bates	5,417	Steph Lewis	William Arnold
Whangaparāoa	Mark Mitchell		23,376	Estefania Muller Pallarès	Lorraine Newman
Whangārei	Emily Henderson	Shane Reti	11,424	Angie Warren-Clark	Gavin Benney
Wigram	Megan Woods		1,187	Tracy Summerfield	Richard Wesley
Māori electorates
Hauraki-Waikato	Nanaia Mahuta	Hana-Rawhiti Maipi-Clarke	2,911	Nanaia Mahuta	Donna Pokere-Phillips
Ikaroa-Rāwhiti	Meka Whaitiri	Cushla Tangaere-Manuel	2,843	Meka Whaitiri	Ata Tuhakaraina
Tāmaki Makaurau	Peeni Henare	Takutai Tarsh Kemp	42	Peeni Henare	Darleen Tana
Te Tai Hauāuru	Adrian Rurawhe	Debbie Ngarewa-Packer	9,222	Soraya Peke-Mason	Harete Hipango
Te Tai Tokerau	Kelvin Davis	Mariameno Kapa-Kingi	517	Kelvin Davis	Hūhana Lyndon
Te Tai Tonga	Rino Tirikatene	Tākuta Ferris	2,824	Rino Tirikatene	Rebecca Robin
Waiariki	Rawiri Waititi		15,891	Toni Boynton	Charles Tiki Hunia

== List results ==
The following list candidates are presumed elected based on the preliminary results:

National	Labour	Green	ACT	NZ First
Nicola Willis (2); Paul Goldsmith (5); Melissa Lee (13); Gerry Brownlee (14); Andrew Bayly (15)	Kelvin Davis (2); Grant Robertson (4); Jan Tinetti (6); Ayesha Verrall (7); Willie Jackson (8); Willow-Jean Prime (9); Damien O'Connor (10); Adrian Rurawhe (11); David Parker (13); Peeni Henare (14); Priyanca Radhakrishnan (15); Kieran McAnulty (16); Ginny Andersen (17); Jo Luxton (19); Rino Tirikatene (21); Deborah Russell (22); Camilla Belich (26)	Marama Davidson (1); James Shaw (2); Teanau Tuiono (5); Lan Pham (6); Golriz Ghahraman (7); Ricardo Menéndez March (8); Steve Abel (9); Hūhana Lyndon (10); Efeso Collins (11); Scott Willis (12); Darleen Tana (13); Kahurangi Carter (14)	Nicole McKee (3); Todd Stephenson (4); Andrew Hoggard (5); Karen Chhour (6); Mark Cameron (7); Simon Court (8); Parmjeet Parmar (9); Laura Trask (10); Cameron Luxton (11)	Winston Peters (1); Shane Jones (2); Casey Costello (3); Mark Patterson (4); Jenny Marcroft (5); Jamie Arbuckle (6); Andy Foster (7); Tanya Unkovich (8)

== MP changes ==
The following MP changes:

Party	New or returning MPs	Resigned or retired MPs	Defeated MPs	MPs switching seat type
National	Suze Redmayne; Katie Nimon; Catherine Wedd; Paulo Garcia; Vanessa Weenink; Rima Nakhle; Dana Kirkpatrick; Carl Bates; Carlos Cheung; Miles Anderson; Dan Bidois; Mike Butterick; Cameron Brewer; Hamish Campbell; Tim Costley; Greg Fleming; Ryan Hamilton; David MacLeod; Grant McCallum; James Meager; Tom Rutherford	Jacqui Dean; David Bennett; Ian McKelvie; Todd Muller	Harete Hipango; Simon O'Connor; Michael Woodhouse	Chris Bishop (to electorate); Shane Reti (to electorate); Andrew Bayly (to list); Maureen Pugh (to electorate)
Labour	Reuben Davidson; Cushla Tangaere-Manuel	David Clark; Paul Eagle; Marja Lubeck; William Sio; Jamie Strange; Poto Williams; Jacinda Ardern; Emily Henderson; Stuart Nash; Kiri Allan; Andrew Little	Tracey McLellan; Shanan Halbert; Glen Bennett; Vanushi Walters; Dan Rosewarne; Naisi Chen; Anahila Kanongata'a-Suisuiki; Angela Roberts; Tāmati Coffey; Ibrahim Omer; Neru Leavasa; Anna Lorck; Angie Warren-Clark; Liz Craig; Michael Wood; Terisa Ngobi; Steph Lewis; Sarah Pallett; Nanaia Mahuta; Soraya Peke-Mason	Grant Robertson (to list); Willow-Jean Prime (to list); Damien O'Connor (to list); Adrian Rurawhe (to list); Priyanca Radhakrishnan (to list); Kieran McAnulty (to list); Ginny Andersen (to list); Jo Luxton (to list); Rino Tirikatene (to list); Deborah Russell (to list); Rachel Brooking (to electorate); Helen White (to electorate); Lemauga Lydia Sosene (to electorate)
Green	Lan Pham; Steve Abel; Hūhana Lyndon; Efeso Collins; Scott Willis; Darleen Tana; Kahurangi Carter; Tamatha Paul	Jan Logie; Eugenie Sage		Julie Anne Genter (to electorate)
ACT	Todd Stephenson; Andrew Hoggard; Parmjeet Parmar; Laura Trask; Cameron Luxton	Damien Smith; James McDowall	Toni Severin; Chris Baillie	Brooke van Velden (to electorate)
NZ First	Winston Peters; Shane Jones; Casey Costello; Mark Patterson; Jenny Marcroft; Jamie Arbuckle; Andy Foster; Tanya Unkovich			
Te Pāti Māori	Hana-Rawhiti Maipi-Clarke; Tākuta Ferris; Takutai Tarsh Kemp; Mariameno Kapa-Kingi		Meka Whaitiri	Debbie Ngarewa-Packer (to electorate)
Independent		Elizabeth Kerekere		

== Maps ==
=== Vote share of plurality party ===

National: 30–40% 40–50% 40–50%
Labour: 30–40% 40–50%

=== Results by electorate ===
Electorate vote by party

Electorate vote by bloc

Party vote by party

Party gaining or holding each electorate

=== Other diagrams ===
Electorate vote by bloc (equal-area map)
