= Results of the 2020 New Zealand general election =

Results of the 2020 general election. From left to right: general electorate winners, Māori electorate winners, and numbers of List MPs.

This article summarises results of the 17 October 2020 New Zealand general election, including both party vote and electorate vote outcomes.

== Release of results ==
Preliminary results were released gradually after polling booths closed at 19:00 (NZDT) on 17 October. The preliminary count only includes advance ordinary and election day ordinary votes; it does not include any special votes, which have a deadline ten days later (27 October). Special votes include votes from those who enrolled after the deadline of 13 September, those who voted outside their electorate (including all overseas votes), voters in hospital or prison, and those voters enrolled on the unpublished roll. The votes in the cannabis referendum and the euthanasia referendum were counted after election day, with preliminary results released on 30 October.

All voting papers, counterfoils and electoral rolls are returned to the electorate's returning officer for a mandatory recount; this also includes approving and counting any special votes, and compiling a master roll to ensure no voter has voted more than once. To simplify processing and counting, overseas votes will be sent to and counted at the Electoral Commission's central processing centre in Wellington, rather than to electorate returning officers. Official results, including all recounted ordinary votes and special votes, as well as the official results of the two referendums, are expected to be released by the Electoral Commission on 6 November 2020.

Parties and candidates have three working days after the release of the official results to apply for a judicial recount. These recounts take place under the auspices of a District Court judge (the Chief District Court Judge in case of a nationwide recount), and may delay the return of the election writ by a few days.

== Party vote ==
Party vote percentage
1. Labour (50.0%)
2. National (25.6%)
3. Green (7.86%)
4. ACT (7.59%)
5. NZ First (2.60%)
6. Opportunities (1.51%)
7. New Conservative (1.48%)
8. Māori (1.17%)
9. Other (2.20%)

Summary of the 17 October 2020 election for the House of Representatives
Party	Party vote				Electorate vote sum				Total seats	+/-
Party	Votes	%	Change (pp)	Seats	Votes	%	Change (pp)	Seats	Total seats	+/-
Labour	1,443,545	50.01	▲13.12	19	1,357,501	48.07	▲10.19	46	65	▲19
National	738,275	25.58	▼18.87	10	963,845	34.13	▼9.92	23	33	▼23
Green	226,757	7.86	▲1.59	9	162,245	5.74	▼1.17	1	10	▲2
ACT	219,031	7.59	▲7.08	9	97,697	3.46	▲2.45	1	10	▲9
NZ First	75,020	2.60	▼4.60	0	30,209	1.07	▼4.38	0	0	▼9
Opportunities (TOP)	43,449	1.51	▼0.94	0	25,181	0.89	▼0.14	0	0	Steady
New Conservative	42,613	1.48	▲1.24	0	49,598	1.76	▲1.52	0	0	Steady
Māori Party	33,630	1.17	▼0.01	1	60,837	2.15	▲0.04	1	2	▲2
Advance NZ	28,429	0.98	new	0	25,054	0.89	new	0	0	new
Legalise Cannabis	13,329	0.46	▲0.15	0	8,044	0.28	▲0.12	0	0	Steady
ONE	8,121	0.28	new	0	6,830	0.24	new	0	0	new
Vision NZ	4,237	0.15	new	0	2,139	0.08	new	0	0	new
Outdoors	3,256	0.11	▲0.05	0	7,982	0.28	▲0.23	0	0	Steady
TEA	2,414	0.08	new	0	2,764	0.10	new	0	0	new
Sustainable NZ	1,880	0.07	new	0	2,421	0.09	new	0	0	new
Social Credit	1,520	0.05	▲0.02	0	2,699	0.11	▼0.09	0	0	Steady
Heartland	914	0.03	new	0	8,462	0.30	new	0	0	new
Unregistered parties	—	—	—	—	3,391	0.12	▲0.08	0	0	Steady
Independent	—	—	—	—	7,299	0.26	▼0.24	0	0	Steady
Valid votes	2,886,420	98.88	▲0.34		2,824,198	96.75	▲0.58			
Informal votes	21,372	0.73	▲0.32		57,138	1.96	▲0.80			
Disallowed votes	11,281	0.39	▼0.66		37,737	2.66	▼1.37			
Below electoral threshold	225,182	7.71			—	—	—			
Total	2,919,073	100		48	2,919,073	100		72	120	
Eligible voters and turnout	3,549,580	82.24	▲2.49		3,549,580	82.24	▲2.49			

Popular vote
Labour	50.0%
National	25.6%
Green	7.9%
ACT	7.6%
NZ First	2.6%
Opportunities	1.5%
New Conservative	1.5%
Māori	1.2%
Others	2.2%

Parliament seats
Labour	54.17%
National	27.50%
ACT	8.33%
Green	8.33%
Māori	1.67%

=== Party vote by electorate ===
The following is a breakdown of the party vote received in each electorate, for parties receiving at least 1% of the nationwide party vote.

Electorate	Labour	National	Green	ACT	NZ First	New Conservative	TOP	Māori
Auckland Central	46.22	21.19	19.14	7.52	1.72	0.54	2.14	0.31
Banks Peninsula	50.47	21.03	14.26	7.00	1.99	1.26	2.18	0.29
Bay of Plenty	42.80	32.57	4.76	10.09	2.95	2.14	1.66	0.43
Botany	47.59	37.14	3.29	6.81	1.44	1.44	0.63	0.19
Christchurch Central	53.64	19.60	12.78	6.20	2.13	1.18	2.19	0.35
Christchurch East	60.26	16.58	8.46	6.16	2.49	2.03	1.43	0.35
Coromandel	43.55	32.76	5.63	9.74	3.03	1.63	0.85	0.25
Dunedin	55.39	14.14	17.82	5.29	1.72	0.91	2.82	0.33
East Coast	50.40	26.96	5.53	7.78	3.44	1.09	0.91	0.75
East Coast Bays	40.25	38.38	6.16	8.81	1.72	1.79	1.14	0.17
Epsom	36.05	37.46	10.99	10.41	1.46	0.50	1.97	0.26
Hamilton East	49.14	27.44	8.00	6.92	2.11	2.01	2.19	0.49
Hamilton West	52.65	25.31	5.68	6.92	2.56	2.05	2.08	0.53
Hutt South	55.14	21.99	9.43	5.63	2.35	1.16	2.16	0.44
Ilam	44.93	29.64	10.34	8.77	1.77	1.23	1.97	0.25
Invercargill	48.09	29.97	3.46	9.61	3.04	2.15	1.08	0.19
Kaikōura	44.60	30.28	5.31	11.45	2.90	1.86	1.15	0.16
Kaipara ki Mahurangi	40.31	33.97	6.31	11.27	2.58	1.49	1.29	0.28
Kelston	62.50	17.33	8.29	4.37	2.59	1.37	1.15	0.52
Mana	58.55	18.48	9.70	5.57	2.21	0.98	1.99	0.56
Mangere	77.37	9.11	3.99	1.55	2.76	1.73	0.41	0.90
Manurewa	73.91	13.03	3.03	1.73	2.87	1.69	0.46	0.82
Maungakiekie	50.75	25.97	9.14	7.14	2.10	1.12	1.87	0.43
Mount Albert	48.90	18.75	20.06	6.00	1.83	0.58	2.53	0.49
Mount Roskill	56.17	24.44	8.02	4.99	1.92	1.20	1.31	0.37
Napier	50.94	28.10	5.86	8.18	2.16	1.47	1.29	0.28
Nelson	53.98	20.71	9.08	8.20	1.90	1.56	1.75	0.20
New Lynn	53.33	21.88	11.45	6.31	2.33	1.16	1.30	0.46
New Plymouth	48.46	30.21	4.63	8.00	2.27	1.73	1.78	0.48
North Shore	41.35	34.05	8.34	9.86	1.90	1.21	1.90	0.25
Northcote	49.56	27.67	8.69	7.32	1.93	1.34	1.85	0.23
Northland	43.98	27.48	6.10	9.51	5.83	1.85	1.01	0.40
Ōhariu	51.07	22.30	13.61	6.10	1.89	0.86	2.80	0.35
Ōtaki	52.56	26.60	6.45	7.18	2.66	1.38	1.06	0.31
Pakuranga	42.05	38.53	4.64	8.57	2.16	1.33	0.93	0.20
Palmerston North	54.89	21.92	7.41	6.76	2.98	1.81	1.95	0.46
Panmure-Ōtāhuhu	73.66	12.75	4.12	2.39	2.48	1.23	0.75	0.65
Papakura	42.74	37.11	4.04	8.81	2.78	1.58	0.82	0.32
Port Waikato	40.38	36.40	3.35	10.71	2.94	1.69	0.92	0.32
Rangitata	48.85	31.48	3.12	9.66	2.00	2.01	0.97	0.13
Rangitīkei	44.56	30.25	4.61	11.39	3.37	1.98	1.41	0.43
Remutaka	58.55	19.11	7.17	6.02	2.99	1.58	1.90	0.39
Rongotai	52.61	13.25	23.72	3.88	1.95	0.51	2.80	0.44
Rotorua	46.68	28.65	4.75	9.06	3.62	1.84	1.59	0.91
Selwyn	42.12	34.01	4.87	12.56	2.00	1.77	1.31	0.14
Southland	38.85	36.07	5.28	12.70	2.01	1.49	1.56	0.15
Taieri	59.43	21.29	5.45	7.37	2.63	1.12	1.28	0.12
Takanini	55.00	30.08	3.31	4.64	1.98	1.70	0.60	0.44
Tāmaki	38.61	37.06	7.68	11.73	1.62	0.69	1.34	0.30
Taranaki-King Country	37.71	36.50	4.82	11.42	2.76	2.74	1.23	0.46
Taupō	45.27	32.75	3.80	9.83	2.78	1.54	1.34	0.37
Tauranga	42.33	32.75	5.49	9.02	3.64	2.36	1.93	0.35
Te Atatū	58.05	22.72	6.51	5.13	2.54	1.41	1.06	0.67
Tukituki	48.29	29.79	5.41	8.91	2.07	2.15	1.08	0.39
Upper Harbour	48.31	31.39	5.33	7.59	1.97	1.86	1.38	0.36
Waikato	39.48	37.72	3.52	10.52	2.71	2.55	1.26	0.35
Waimakariri	49.69	28.50	4.67	9.31	2.13	3.01	0.94	0.16
Wairarapa	48.18	29.27	5.18	9.19	3.43	1.49	1.09	0.28
Waitaki	44.08	31.26	5.66	11.65	1.98	1.92	1.30	0.12
Wellington Central	43.57	14.48	30.44	4.88	1.12	0.43	3.74	0.53
West Coast-Tasman	47.34	25.22	8.24	9.77	2.96	1.68	1.28	0.20
Whanganui	51.71	26.37	4.88	7.94	3.33	1.68	0.95	0.54
Whangaparāoa	40.04	36.70	4.89	10.61	2.15	2.29	1.22	0.20
Whangārei	47.28	26.19	6.18	8.24	5.12	1.84	1.50	0.34
Wigram	55.17	21.57	9.11	5.78	2.03	1.64	2.46	0.32
Hauraki-Waikato	64.73	3.73	6.35	1.31	3.66	0.41	1.02	12.26
Ikaroa-Rāwhiti	67.33	2.33	6.48	0.88	3.76	0.38	0.74	12.16
Tāmaki Makaurau	61.09	3.16	10.65	1.08	4.28	0.52	1.04	12.93
Te Tai Hauāuru	61.98	3.04	6.82	1.22	3.57	0.33	1.01	15.69
Te Tai Tokerau	61.10	3.67	7.48	1.33	7.23	0.40	1.02	10.35
Te Tai Tonga	59.54	5.72	11.70	2.79	3.50	0.71	1.86	8.81
Waiariki	60.67	2.39	5.95	0.94	3.67	0.38	0.90	17.75

== Electorate vote ==
Party affiliation of winning electorate candidates.

The table below shows the results of the 2020 general election:

Key

National
Labour
ACT
Green
NZ First
New Conservative
Opportunities
Māori Party
Heartland
Advance NZ
Legalise Cannabis
Vision NZ
Independent

Electorate results of the 2020 New Zealand general election
Electorate	Incumbent	Winner	Majority	Runner up	Third place
Auckland Central	Nikki Kaye	Chlöe Swarbrick	1,068	Helen White	Emma Mellow
Banks Peninsula	New electorate	Tracey McLellan	13,156	Catherine Chu	Eugenie Sage
Bay of Plenty	Todd Muller		3,415	Angie Warren-Clark	Bruce Carley
Botany	Jami-Lee Ross	Christopher Luxon	3,999	Naisi Chen	Damien Smith
Christchurch Central	Duncan Webb		14,098	Dale Stephens	Chrys Horn
Christchurch East	Poto Williams		17,336	Lincoln Platt	Nikki Berry
Coromandel	Scott Simpson		3,505	Nathaniel Blomfield	Pamela Grealey
Dunedin	New electorate	David Clark	15,521	Michael Woodhouse	Jack Brazil
East Coast	Anne Tolley	Kiri Allan	6,331	Tania Tapsell	Meredith Akuhata-Brown
East Coast Bays	Erica Stanford		8,764	Monina Hernandez	Dan Jones
Epsom	David Seymour		9,224	Camilla Belich	Paul Goldsmith
Hamilton East	David Bennett	Jamie Strange	2,973	David Bennett	Rimu Bhooi
Hamilton West	Tim Macindoe	Gaurav Sharma	6,267	Tim Macindoe	Roger Weldon
Hutt South	Chris Bishop	Ginny Andersen	3,777	Chris Bishop	Richard McIntosh
Ilam	Gerry Brownlee	Sarah Pallett	3,463	Gerry Brownlee	David Bennett
Invercargill	Sarah Dowie	Penny Simmonds	224	Liz Craig	Rochelle Francis
Kaikōura	Stuart Smith		2,295	Matt Flight	Richard McCubbin
Kaipara ki Mahurangi	New electorate	Chris Penk	4,435	Marja Lubeck	Beth Houlbrooke
Kelston	Carmel Sepuloni		15,660	Bala Beeram	Jessamine Fraser
Mana	Kris Faafoi	Barbara Edmonds	16,224	Jo Hayes	Jan Logie
Māngere	William Sio		19,396	Agnes Loheni	Peter Brian Sykes
Manurewa	Louisa Wall	Arena Williams	17,179	Nuwi Samarakone	John Hall
Maungakiekie	Denise Lee	Priyanca Radhakrishnan	635	Denise Lee	Ricardo Menéndez March
Mount Albert	Jacinda Ardern		21,246	Melissa Lee	Luke Wijohn
Mount Roskill	Michael Wood		13,853	Parmjeet Parmar	Golriz Ghahraman
Napier	Stuart Nash		5,856	Katie Nimon	James Crow
Nelson	Nick Smith	Rachel Boyack	4,525	Nick Smith	Aaron Stallard
New Lynn	Deborah Russell		13,134	Lisa Whyte	Steve Abel
New Plymouth	Jonathan Young	Glen Bennett	2,555	Jonathan Young	Murray Chong
North Shore	Maggie Barry	Simon Watts	3,734	Romy Udanga	Liz Rawlings
Northcote	Dan Bidois	Shanan Halbert	2,534	Dan Bidois	Natasha Fairley
Northland	Matt King	Willow-Jean Prime	163	Matt King	Shane Jones
Ōhāriu	Greg O'Connor		11,961	Brett Hudson	Jessica Hammond
Ōtaki	Nathan Guy	Terisa Ngobi	2,988	Tim Costley	Bernard Long
Pakuranga	Simeon Brown		10,050	Nerissa Henry	Lawrence Xu-Nan
Palmerston North	Iain Lees-Galloway	Tangi Utikere	12,508	William Wood	Teanau Tuiono
Panmure-Ōtāhuhu	New electorate	Jenny Salesa	18,626	Kanwaljit Singh Bakshi	Mark Simiona
Papakura	Judith Collins		5,583	Anahila Kanongata'a-Suisuiki	Sue Cowie
Port Waikato	New electorate	Andrew Bayly	4,313	Baljit Kaur	Mark Ball
Rangitata	Vacant (Note: Was Andrew Falloon until his immediate resignation on 21 July 2020.)	Jo Luxton	4,408	Megan Hands	Hamish Hutton
Rangitīkei	Ian McKelvie		2,961	Soraya Peke-Mason	Ali Hale Tilley
Remutaka	Chris Hipkins		20,497	Mark Crofskey	Chris Norton
Rongotai	Paul Eagle		19,207	Teall Crossen	David Patterson
Rotorua	Todd McClay		825	Claire Mahon	Kaya Sparke
Selwyn	Amy Adams	Nicola Grigg	4,968	Reuben Davidson	Stuart Armstrong
Southland	New electorate	Joseph Mooney	5,645	Jon Mitchell	David Kennedy
Taieri	New electorate	Ingrid Leary	12,398	Liam Kernaghan	Scott Willis
Takanini	New electorate	Neru Leavasa	7,724	Rima Nakhle	Mike McCormick
Tāmaki	Simon O'Connor		8,068	Shirin Brown	Sylvia Boys
Taranaki-King Country	Barbara Kuriger		3,134	Angela Roberts	Brent Miles
Taupō	Louise Upston		5,119	Ala' Al-Bustanji	Danna Glendining
Tauranga	Simon Bridges		1,856	Jan Tinetti	Josh Cole
Te Atatū	Phil Twyford		10,508	Alfred Ngaro	Scott Hindman
Tukituki	Lawrence Yule	Anna Lorck	1,590	Lawrence Yule	Chris Perley
Upper Harbour	Paula Bennett	Vanushi Walters	2,392	Jake Bezzant	Ryan Nicholls
Waikato	Tim van de Molen		5,216	Kerrin Leoni	James McDowall
Waimakariri	Matt Doocey		1,507	Dan Rosewarne	Leighton Baker
Wairarapa	Alastair Scott	Kieran McAnulty	6,545	Mike Butterick	Ron Mark
Waitaki	Jacqui Dean		3,281	Liam Wairepo	Sampsa Kiuru
Wellington Central	Grant Robertson		18,878	Nicola Willis	James Shaw
West Coast-Tasman	Damien O'Connor		6,208	Maureen Pugh	Steve Richards
Whanganui	Harete Hipango	Steph Lewis	8,191	Harete Hipango	Alan Clay
Whangaparāoa	New electorate	Mark Mitchell	7,823	Lorayne Ferguson	Paul Grace
Whangārei	Shane Reti	Emily Henderson	431	Shane Reti	David Seymour (Note: The David Seymour who contested the electorate of Whangārei for ACT is a different person from ACT party leader, David Seymour, who re-contested and won his Auckland seat of Epsom.)
Wigram	Megan Woods		14,770	Hamish Campbell	Richard Wesley
Māori electorates
Hauraki-Waikato	Nanaia Mahuta		9,660	Donna Pokere-Phillips	Philip Lambert
Ikaroa-Rāwhiti	Meka Whaitiri		6,045	Heather Te Au-Skipworth	Elizabeth Kerekere
Tāmaki Makaurau	Peeni Henare		927	John Tamihere	Marama Davidson
Te Tai Hauāuru	Adrian Rurawhe		1,053	Debbie Ngarewa-Packer	Noeline Apiata
Te Tai Tokerau	Kelvin Davis		8,164	Mariameno Kapa-Kingi	Maki Herbert
Te Tai Tonga	Rino Tirikatene		6,855	Tākuta Ferris	Ariana Paretutanganui-Tamati
Waiariki	Tāmati Coffey	Rawiri Waititi	836	Tāmati Coffey	Hannah Tamaki

== List results ==
Labour	National	Green	ACT	Māori
Andrew Little (07); David Parker (09); Trevor Mallard (11); Kris Faafoi (15); Ayesha Verrall (17); Willie Jackson (19); Louisa Wall (27); Camilla Belich (30); Jan Tinetti (32); Marja Lubeck (34); Angie Warren-Clark (35); Tāmati Coffey (37); Naisi Chen (38); Liz Craig (41); Ibrahim Omer (42); Anahila Kanongata'a-Suisuiki (44); Rachel Brooking (46); Helen White (48); Angela Roberts (50)	Gerry Brownlee (02); Paul Goldsmith (03); Shane Reti (05); Chris Bishop (07); David Bennett (11); Michael Woodhouse (12); Nicola Willis (13); Melissa Lee (16); Nick Smith (18); Maureen Pugh (19)	Marama Davidson (01); James Shaw (02); Julie Anne Genter (04); Jan Logie (05); Eugenie Sage (06); Golriz Ghahraman (07); Teanau Tuiono (08); Elizabeth Kerekere (09); Ricardo Menéndez March (10)	Brooke van Velden (02); Nicole McKee (03); Chris Baillie (04); Simon Court (05); James McDowall (06); Karen Chhour (07); Mark Cameron (08); Toni Severin (09); Damien Smith (10)	Debbie Ngarewa-Packer (01)

== MP changes ==
Based on preliminary results, there were 40 new MPs: 22 for Labour, 5 for National, 9 for ACT, 3 for the Greens, and 1 for the Māori Party. When final results were announced on 6 November, this rose to 42 new members, the two additional new members being Emily Henderson (Labour) and Debbie Ngarewa-Packer (Māori).

Party	New MPs	Resigned or retired MPs	Defeated MPs	MPs switching seat type
Labour	Ayesha Verrall; Vanushi Walters; Camilla Belich; Naisi Chen; Ibrahim Omer; Rachel Brooking; Helen White; Barbara Edmonds; Angela Roberts; Shanan Halbert; Neru Leavasa; Tracey McLellan; Steph Lewis; Rachel Boyack; Arena Williams; Ingrid Leary; Sarah Pallett; Gaurav Sharma; Emily Henderson; Terisa Ngobi; Glen Bennett; Tangi Utikere; Anna Lorck	Ruth Dyson; Clare Curran; Raymond Huo; Iain Lees-Galloway		Kris Faafoi (to list); Kiri Allan (to electorate); Kieran McAnulty (to electorate); Louisa Wall (to list); Priyanca Radhakrishnan (to electorate); Willow-Jean Prime (to electorate); Tāmati Coffey (to list); Jo Luxton (to electorate); Jamie Strange (to electorate); Ginny Andersen (to electorate)
National	Nicola Grigg; Christopher Luxon; Joseph Mooney; Penny Simmonds; Simon Watts	David Carter; Alastair Scott; Nathan Guy; Maggie Barry; Sarah Dowie; Nicky Wagner; Anne Tolley; Paula Bennett; Hamish Walker; Jian Yang; Nikki Kaye; Amy Adams; Andrew Falloon (Note: The resignation of Andrew Falloon was effective immediately, but since it took place less than six months before the general election, a by-election to fill the vacancy was not required.)	Harete Hipango; Jonathan Young; Tim Macindoe; Kanwaljit Singh Bakshi; Paulo Garcia; Parmjeet Parmar; Agnes Loheni; Alfred Ngaro; Lawrence Yule; Denise Lee; Brett Hudson; Matt King; Dan Bidois; Jo Hayes	Gerry Brownlee (to list); Shane Reti (to list); Chris Bishop (to list); David Bennett (to list); Nick Smith (to list)
ACT	Brooke van Velden; Nicole McKee; Chris Baillie; Simon Court; James McDowall; Karen Chhour; Mark Cameron; Toni Severin; Damien Smith			
Green	Teanau Tuiono; Elizabeth Kerekere; Ricardo Menéndez March	Gareth Hughes		Chlöe Swarbrick (to electorate)
Māori Party	Debbie Ngarewa-Packer; Rawiri Waititi			
NZ First		Clayton Mitchell	Winston Peters; Fletcher Tabuteau; Tracey Martin; Shane Jones; Ron Mark; Darroch Ball; Mark Patterson; Jenny Marcroft	
Advance NZ			Jami-Lee Ross	
