= 2022 Hamilton West by-election =

New Zealand by-election

- 10 December 2022

Hamilton West electorate of the House of Representatives
- Turnout: 15,104 (31.4%)
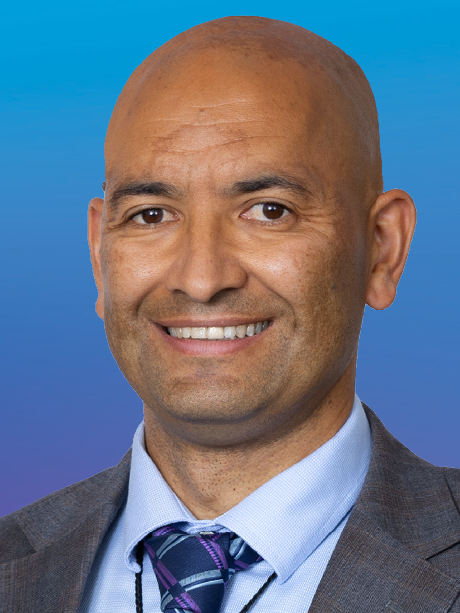

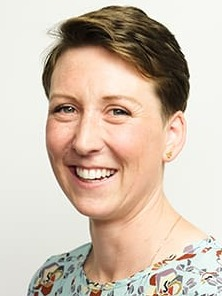

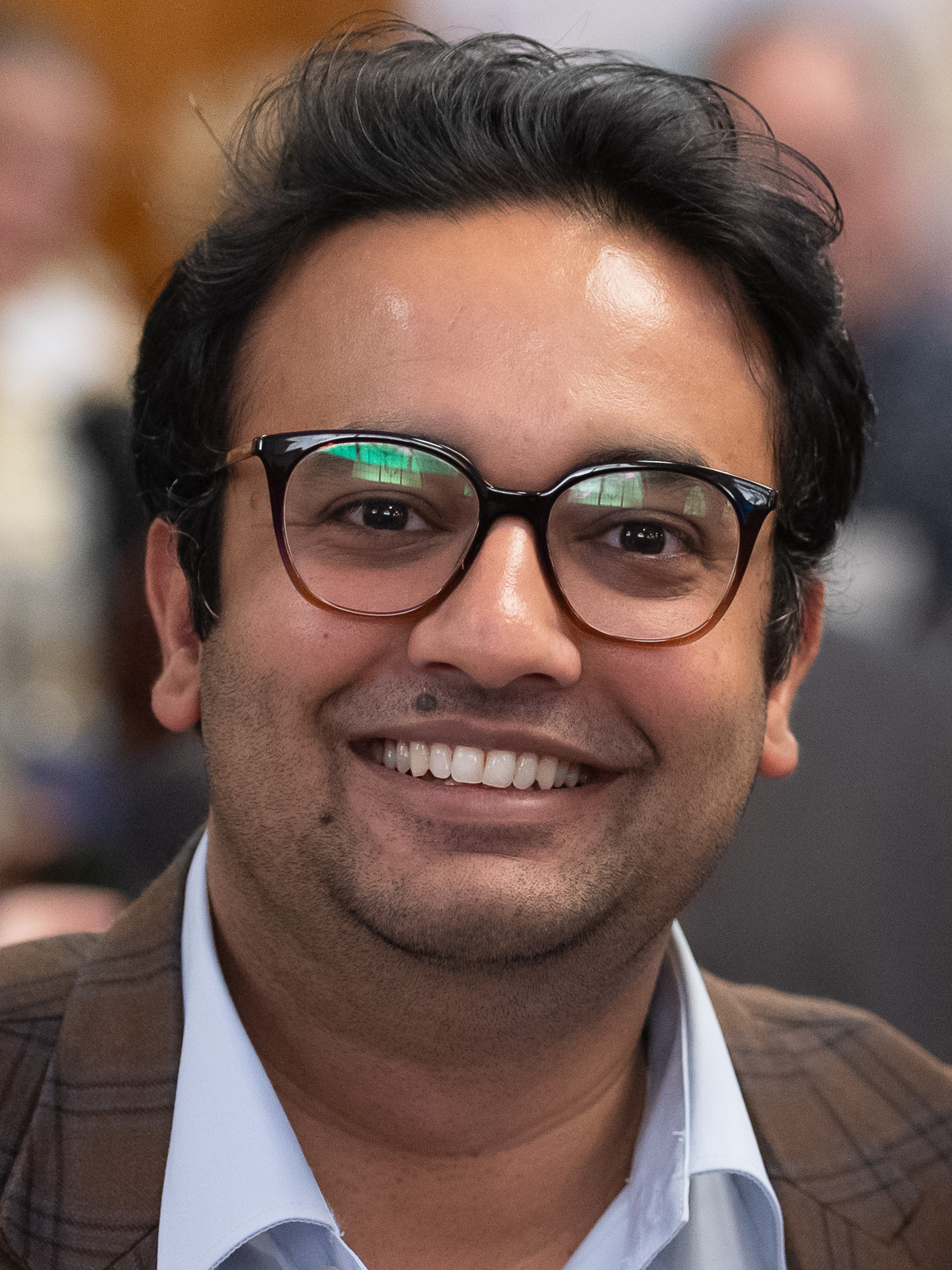
Candidate	Tama Potaka	Georgie Dansey
Party	National	Labour
Popular vote	6,974	4,541
Percentage	46.29%	30.14%
	ACT
Candidate	James McDowall	Gaurav Sharma
Party	ACT	Momentum
Popular vote	1,515	1,242
Percentage	10.06%	8.24%
- Potaka: 30–40% 40–50% 50–60% 60–70% Dansey: 30–40% No polling places
MP before election
Gaurav Sharma
Independent
Elected MP
Tama Potaka
National

The 2022 Hamilton West by-election was a by-election in New Zealand's Hamilton West electorate. The seat became vacant due to the resignation of former Labour Party MP Gaurav Sharma on 18 October 2022 after expulsion from the party caucus.

The by-election was held on 10 December 2022, with twelve candidates on the ballot, and was won by the National Party candidate Tama Potaka. The results were reported by media outlets and opposition parties as a sign of waning support for Prime Minister Jacinda Ardern's administration and the Labour Party ahead of the 2023 New Zealand general election, although the by-election was marked by low turnout.

== Background ==
In August 2022, Sharma was first suspended and then expelled from the Labour parliamentary caucus after breaching confidentiality of caucus communications. On 18 October 2022, Sharma resigned from Parliament, claiming that Labour leader Jacinda Ardern was planning to wait until the 2023 New Zealand general election was less than six months away and then invoke the Electoral (Integrity) Amendment Act 2018, also known as waka-jumping legislation. This would vacate Sharma's Hamilton West seat late enough in the 53rd Parliament to avoid a by-election, leaving the electorate unrepresented. Ardern, Grant Robertson and Chris Hipkins rejected this unproven claim. On 20 October, Ardern announced that the by-election would be held on 10 December.

Ardern was critical of Sharma's decision to resign and trigger a by-election, saying it was a waste of taxpayer money.

=== Electorate ===
Hamilton West covers the western half of Hamilton, New Zealand's fourth-largest city. It covers the entire Hamilton City Council area west of the Waikato River, as well as part of Flagstaff east of the river.

This was Hamilton West's first by-election. The electorate is regarded as a bellwether seat; in all but one general election since the electorate's creation in 1969, the party that has won the plurality of seats nationally has won Hamilton West.

== Candidates ==
Candidate nominations closed on Tuesday 8 November, and were announced on Wednesday 9 November. There are twelve candidates.

Party	Candidate	Background
Labour	Georgie Dansey	List-only candidate in 2020
Independent	Gordon John Dickson	Received 9 votes in the 2022 Tauranga by-election; Labour Party candidate in Selwyn, 2014
ONE	Rudi du Plooy	Joint candidate. New Conservative Hamilton West candidate in 2020, Hamilton City Council candidate in 2022 and 2019
New Conservative	Rudi du Plooy	Joint candidate. New Conservative Hamilton West candidate in 2020, Hamilton City Council candidate in 2022 and 2019
Independent	Frank Fu	Candidate for Albert-Eden-Puketāpapa Ward in the 2022 Auckland local elections
ACT	James McDowall	List MP (2020–present), former candidate for Waikato (2020) and Hamilton East (2017)
Money Free	Richard Osmaston	Ran simultaneously for mayor of six different districts in the 2022 local elections
Opportunities	Naomi Pocock	TOP candidate for Hamilton East in 2020
Outdoors	Donna Pokere-Phillips	Party co-leader, previous candidate in multiple local and national elections
National	Tama Potaka	Chief executive of Ngāi Tai ki Tāmaki
Momentum	Gaurav Sharma	Labour MP for Hamilton West 2020–2022
Vision NZ	Jade Tait	
Legalise Cannabis	Peter Wakeman	Contested 2022 Tauranga by-election and 2022 Christchurch mayoral election

Resigned MP Gaurav Sharma contested the by-election under the banner of his new New Zealand Momentum Party. His campaign was backed financially by wealthy businessman Roshan Nauhria who was involved with the now defunct People's Party. Sharma had stated that he intended to form a new centrist party "with focus on outcomes and action rather than on ideologies."

The Labour Party candidate was Georgie Dansey (Ngāti Tūwharetoa), the chief executive of the Independent Schools Education Association. In 2020 she sought the Hamilton West nomination and was 81st on Labour's party list. Others who had been seen as possible Labour candidates included Dan Steer, an electorate staffer and candidate in the Hamilton City Council's 2022 local elections, and city councillor Maxine van Oosten, who declined to seek nomination citing commitments as the council's Finance and Monitoring Committee chairperson.

The National Party candidate was Tama Potaka, chief executive of Ngāi Tai ki Tāmaki. Two other potential candidates were shortlisted – health manager Dr Frances Hughes, and Rachel Afeaki-Taumoepeau (a business director and former chair of the New Zealand Tonga Business Council who had been on the party's list in 2020). In the lead-up to the selection, party leader Christopher Luxon repeatedly committed to making the party's caucus more diverse. Both former MP Tim Macindoe, who lost the Hamilton West seat to Sharma in 2020, and former one-term Hamilton mayor Andrew King had indicated an interest in the candidacy before ultimately standing aside. The New Zealand Herald's political editor, Claire Trevett, consequently wrote that the party had effectively implemented a "white-man ban".

The Opportunities Party's (TOP's) candidate was Naomi Pocock, a project manager at the University of Waikato and TOP's candidate in Hamilton East at the 2020 election, where she placed fourth. TOP's 2020 candidate for Hamilton West, Hayden Cargo, had moved to Auckland and taken up the role of Party Secretary.

ACT New Zealand's candidate was list MP James McDowall. He won 5.2% of the Waikato electorate vote in 2020 and 0.39% of Hamilton East's vote in 2017.

The New Conservative Party and ONE Party cooperated, with Rudi du Plooy as their joint candidate. In 2020, du Plooy stood in the same seat for the New Conservatives, while in 2019 and 2022 he ran unsuccessfully for a West Ward seat on the Hamilton City Council.

NZ Outdoors & Freedom Party co-leader Donna Pokere-Phillips also stood. She previously ran for both the Hamilton mayoralty and a seat in the city's new Māori Ward in October 2022, and in the city council's 2021 Hamilton East by-election. In national politics she stood in Hauraki-Waikato for the Māori Party in 2020 and in Hamilton West for The Opportunities Party in 2017.

The Aotearoa Legalise Cannabis Party selected pilot, and non-cannabis user, Peter Wakeman as their candidate. A perennial candidate, Wakeman had recently stood at the 2022 Christchurch mayoral election.

Vision NZ, under the far-right umbrella party Freedoms NZ, were represented by Jade Tait. Her father, Derek Tait, is a Destiny Church pastor and a leader within the Freedom & Rights Coalition.

The Green Party and New Zealand First did not contest the election.

== Campaigning ==
The regulated period for election expenses began on Thursday, 20 October. Two weeks of advance voting started on Monday 28 November. Television and radio advertising was allowed only from Wednesday, 2 November to Friday, 9 December, when all forms of advertising were required to end by midnight. A spending limit of $61,100 (including GST) applied to each candidate.

Both Labour and National claimed "underdog" status even before their candidates had been selected.

The day after her candidacy was announced, Labour's Georgie Dansey was seen at an ambush protest against her own party's health minister, Andrew Little. The protest, at the University of Waikato, was organised by the Tertiary Education Union and focused on the working conditions of University staff. Little had visited the University to make an announcement about student mental health. In a subsequent Facebook post on 2 November 2022, Dansey denied being part of the ambush protest, saying "I was at the uni today in my capacity as an education sector union rep. I wasn't there to protest the Minister and when it became clear the Minister was being ambushed, I left".

On 5 November Sharma was ordered by Parliamentary Service chief executive Rafael Gonzalez-Montero to remove a sign outside his former electorate office stating he was the MP for Hamilton West, which was incorrect after his resignation. Sharma stated he had not received any order and the matter was "...up to Parliamentary Service to sort it out."

On 17 November, Luxon announced National's youth crime policies while campaigning with Hamilton West candidate Tama Potaka, Police spokesperson Mark Mitchell, and justice spokesperson Paul Goldsmith. Key policy announcements included the creation of a new Young Serious Offender category and boot camps known as "Youth Offender Military Academies" for juvenile offenders, electronic monitoring, targeting gangs, and funding community groups. During the policy announcement, Potaka said that Hamilton had become known as the "ramraid capital of New Zealand" in reference to the nationwide surge in ram raids in 2022. He also stated that he wanted "Hamilton West to be the best city to grow up and grow old in."

== Opinion polling ==
A poll was conducted by Curia and commissioned by the ACT Party during 21 and 22 October, before any candidates other than Sharma had been announced and before NZ First announced it would not contest the election. The poll asked 400 eligible voters, "while candidates for the by-election haven't been announced yet, which party's candidate are you most likely to vote for?" It reported that 44.7% of respondents said they were most likely to vote for the National Party candidate, compared with 36.6% for a Labour candidate, 8.6% for the ACT candidate, 4.7% for the Green candidate, and 2.9% for the NZ First candidate. Only 2.5% answered the question saying they would most likely vote for Sharma.

A second poll, the first after candidates were announced, was released on 5 December. National's Tama Potaka was on 46% of decided voters, Labour's Georgie Dansey with 33%, ACT's James McDowall on 12% and Sharma on 4%.

Poll source	Date(s)	Georgie Dansey	James McDowall	Tama Potaka	Gaurav Sharma	Other/Undecided
Curia/ACT	21–22 October 2022	36.6%	8.6%	44.7%	2.5%	7.6%
Taxpayers’ Union	27 November 2022	33%	12%	46%	4%	5%

== Results ==
The following table shows the final by-election results:

2022 Hamilton West by-election
Notes: Blue background denotes the winner of the by-election. Pink background denotes a candidate elected from their party list prior to the by-election. Yellow background denotes the winner of the by-election, who was a list MP prior to the by-election. A ✓ or ✗ denotes status of any incumbent, win or lose respectively.
Party	Candidate	Votes	%	±%
National	Tama Potaka	6,974	46.29	
Labour	Georgie Dansey	4,541	30.14	
ACT	James McDowall	1,515	10.06	
Momentum	Gaurav Sharma	1,242	8.24	−43.61
Opportunities	Naomi Pocock	357	2.37	
Outdoors	Donna Pokere-Phillips	130	0.86	
New Conservatives/ONE	Rudi du Plooy	118	0.78	−0.76
Legalise Cannabis	Peter Wakeman	76	0.50	
Vision NZ	Jade Tait	61	0.40	
Independent	Gordon Dickson	26	0.17	
Independent	Frank Fu	20	0.13	
Money Free	Richard Osmaston	7	0.05	
Informal votes		37	0.27	−1.96
Majority		2,433	16.15	
Turnout		15,104	31.40	−49.80
National gain from Labour		Swing	+	
