= Georgie Dansey =

New Zealand Labour Party politician elected in 2026

Georgie Dansey MP
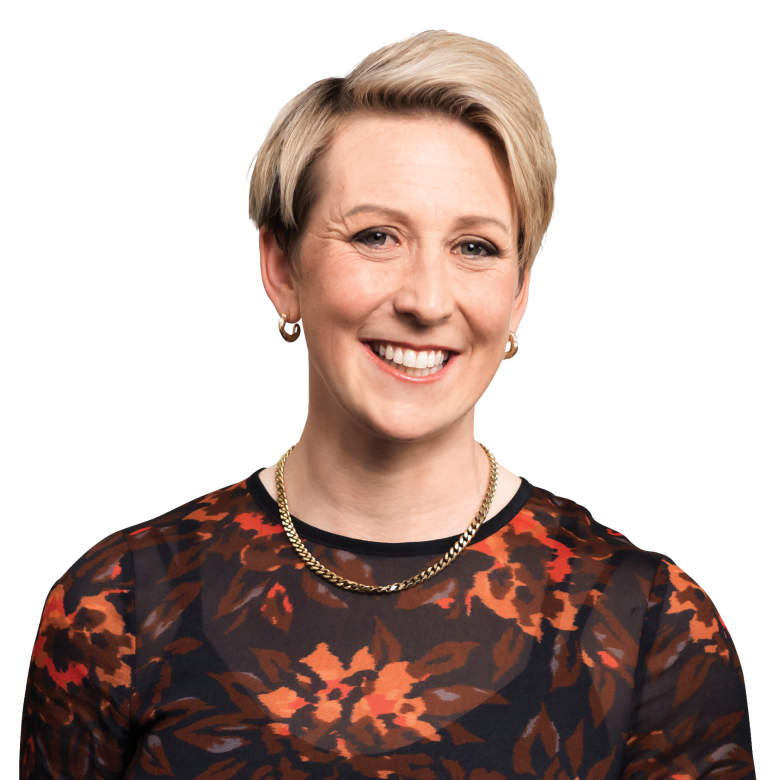
- Dansey in 2023

Member of the New Zealand Parliament for Labour Party list
- In office 9 February 2026 – 7 November 2026
- Preceded by: Adrian Rurawhe (Note: Normally, list MPs do not have individual predecessors or successors, but Rurawhe resigned during a sitting parliament and therefore was succeeded by Dansey.)

Personal details
- Born: Georgina Michaela Celestine Dansey; 1986 (age 39–40)
- Party: Labour
- Other political affiliations: Green
- Spouse: Ruby
- Relations: Harry Dansey (great-uncle)
- Children: 3
- Profession: Fitness trainer

Georgina Michaela Celestine Dansey (born 1986) is a New Zealand politician and Member of Parliament in the House of Representatives for the Labour Party. She became a list MP following the resignation of Adrian Rurawhe in 2026.

== Early life and career ==
Dansey identifies with the Ngāti Tūwharetoa iwi. After leaving university she became a teacher later becoming involved as a trade unionist. She is chief executive of the Independent Schools Education Association and owns her own business, Body Fit Training, in Te Awamutu.

== Political career ==
New Zealand Parliament
Years	Term	Electorate	List	Party
2026–present	54th	List	31	Labour

=== Labour Party activism and candidacy, 2020–2026 ===
After attending a women's event at a local hairdresser she joined the Labour Party and was an active campaign volunteer for six years before joining with the Greens to campaign for Chlöe Swarbrick at the 2017 election. She then rejoined Labour ahead of the 2020 election, earning her the nickname of being a "watermelon". Dansey became chair of Labour's Hamilton East electorate committee and lost the Labour selection for Hamilton West to Gaurav Sharma in 2020 in a close vote. She proceeded to become a list-only candidate at the 2020 election, and was placed last on Labour's party list.

On 1 November 2022, Dansey was announced as Labour's candidate for Hamilton West at the 2022 Hamilton West by-election after the resignation of Gaurav Sharma. The very next day Dansey was seen as present at an ambush protest directed at Labour Party cabinet minister Andrew Little. The protest was held by members of the Tertiary Education Union (TEU) regarding pay restraint. Dansey stated she was "there in my capacity as an education sector union rep". In a subsequent Facebook post on 2 November 2022, Dansey denied being part of the ambush protest, saying "I was at the uni today in my capacity as an education sector union rep. I wasn't there to protest the Minister and when it became clear the Minister was being ambushed, I left". She lost the by-election to National's Tama Potaka. On election night she conceded defeat and also stated she would stand in the seat again at the 2023 election.

Despite stating she would contest Hamilton West again, her candidacy for neighbouring Hamilton East was announced on 2 April 2023. She was given the relatively high placing on the Labour Party list of 31, the highest for a non-sitting MP and higher still than many other sitting MPs. She was unsuccessful in winning the seat and was not high enough on the party list to be allocated a seat. After the election, she was elected by members to the Labour Party's policy council. In campaign material for that election, she pitched her candidacy on focusing policy on the cost of living.

=== Member of Parliament, 2026–present ===
On 9 February 2026, Dansey became an MP on the Labour Party list, replacing the retiring list MP Adrian Rurawhe. During a shadow cabinet reshuffle on 11 March 2026, Dansey gained the rainbow issues and regulation portfolios.

During the 2026 New Zealand general election, Dansey contested the Hamilton East electorate for Labour. She was ranked 32nd on the Labour Party list. Based on preliminary results released on 8 November, Dansey came second place to the incumbent National MP Ryan Hamilton with 13,683 votes. Due to her list ranking, Dansey was not re-elected into Parliament on the Labour Party list. Due to the narrow margin of 456 votes, Dansey has expressed hope that the release of the final results on 27 November could change the outcome of the Hamilton East in her favour.

== Personal life and family ==
Dansey and her partner, Ruby, have three children. She identifies as queer, and has a drag king persona named Peter Pansy. Her great-uncle, Harry Dansey, was an Auckland City Councillor and New Zealand's race relations commissioner. On her mother's side, an ancestor of her was William Heaton-Armstrong, an MP in Britain for Sudbury from 1906 to 1910.
