= New Zealand electorates =

Voting districts for election to the New Zealand Parliament

Map of electorates at the 2026 general election

An electorate or electoral district (Māori: rohe pōti) is a geographic constituency used for electing a member (MP) to the New Zealand Parliament. The size of electorates is determined such that all electorates have approximately the same electoral population.

Before 1996, all MPs were directly chosen for office by the voters of an electorate. Thereafter, New Zealand's electoral system provides that some (in practice, the majority) of the usually 120 seats in Parliament are filled by electorate representatives with the remainder being filled from party lists in order to achieve proportional representation among parties. The number of electorates changes periodically, in line with national population growth. Starting from the 2020 general election, there are 72 electorates including the Māori electorates.

== Terminology ==
The Electoral Act 1993 refers to electorates as "electoral districts". Electorates are informally referred to as "seats" (Māori: tūru), but technically the term seat refers to an elected member's place in Parliament. (Note: Historically the only way to gain a seat in Parliament was to win an electorate, but under the present MMP system, MPs selected from party lists—called list MPs—are able to gain a seat without representing an electorate.)

== Distribution ==
=== Under first-past-the-post (1853–1993) ===
The electoral boundaries for the inaugural 1853 general election were drawn up by the governor, George Grey, with the authority for this coming from the New Zealand Constitution Act 1852. After the initial election, there were eight redivisions carried out by members of the general assembly (as the lower house was known at the time). These revisions were a mixture of minor and major boundary adjustments. In 1887, the responsibility for reshaping electorates was given to a Representation Commission and that arrangement has remained to this day. Up until 1981, the boundaries of the Māori electorates were determined by the governor or governor-general, when that responsibility was also transferred to the Representation Commission.

Since the Representation Act 1900 and 1902 electoral redistribution, the number of electorates had been fixed at 80. Slower growth in the population of the South Island compared to the North Island meant the number of South Island electorates, once near-equal to the North, was decreasing and the geographic size of those electorates was growing. The 80-electorate cap was removed in 1969 and instead the number of South Island electorates fixed at 25. Thereafter, the number of electorates steadily increased, peaking with 99 members elected in 1993, of whom 74 were elected from North Island electorates.

Elections for the House of Representatives in the 1850s modelled the electoral procedures used for the British House of Commons, which at that time featured both single-member electorates (electorates returning just one MP) and multi-member electorates (electorates returning more than one MP). Each electorate was allocated a different number of MPs (up to three) in order to balance electoral population differences. All electorates used a plurality voting system, except between 1908 and 1913 when a two-round voting system was employed.

Electorate boundaries were not always drawn to provide for proportional representation between communities. From 1881, a special country quota meant that rural seats could contain fewer people than urban seats, preserving improportionality by over-representing the rural electoral population (mostly made up by farmers). The country quota inflated the number of the electoral population outside of cities and certain towns by some percentage. The quota was at first 33% (1881–1887), then briefly 18% (1887–1889), and 28% for the remaining period (1889–1945). For the 1905 election, the multi-member electorates were abolished. The country quota persisted until 1945. A system of Māori electorates providing indigenous representation was established in 1867 but these were not drawn in proportion to their general electorate counterparts until the election of the 45th New Zealand Parliament in 1996.

=== Under mixed-member proportional representation (since 1996) ===
Number of electorates since 1996 (South Island electorates = 16)
Election Year	Parliament	North Island electorates	Māori electorates	Total
1996	45th	44	5	65
1999	46th	45	6	67
2002	47th	46	7	69
2005	48th	46	7	69
2008	49th	47	7	70
2011	50th	47	7	70
2014	51st	48	7	71
2017	52nd	48	7	71
2020	53rd	49	7	72
2023	54th	49	7	72
2026	55th	48	7	71

Since the introduction of the mixed-member proportional system at the 1996 election, there have been at least 120 MPs and the number of South Island electorates has been fixed at 16. Like under the previous system, the number of North Island electorates is calculated in proportion to the South Island and that number has risen from 44 to a peak of 49 in 2020 and 2023. The new electoral system also provides for the number of Māori electorates to be calculated proportionally, and these have sat at 7 since 2002. In October 2024, Statistics New Zealand announced that population changes necessitated reducing the number of North Island general electorates by one, returning the number of North Island general electorates to 48.

Because the number of MPs is fixed at a minimum of 120, adding additional electorates means there are fewer seats available for list MPs. List MP seats are assigned proportionally to parties that win at least one electorate or receive at least 5% of the party vote. However, additional list MPs may be elected if overhang seats are required due to a party winning more electorates than its party vote share entitles it; the total number of members may therefore be more than 120. In 2005 and 2011, 121 members were elected; 122 members were elected in 2008; 123 members were elected in 2023.

=== Representation Commission ===
The Representation Commission has determined general electorate boundaries since 1881. These days, the Commission consists of:

- Four government officials—the Government Statistician, the Surveyor-General, the Chief Electoral Officer, and the Chairperson of the Local Government Commission.
- A representative of the governing party or coalition, and a representative of the opposition bloc.
- A chairperson (often a judge) nominated by the other members (with the exception of Chairperson of the Local Government Commission).

The Representation Commission reviews electorate boundaries after each New Zealand census, which normally occurs every five years. The Electoral Act 1993 stipulates that the South Island is to have 16 general electorates, and dividing the number of persons in the South Island's general electoral population by 16 determines the South Island Quota. (Note: Electoral Act 1993, s 35(3).) This quota is then used to calculate the number of Māori electorates (Note: Electoral Act 1993, s 45(3).) and to determine the number of North Island electorates. (Note: Electoral Act 1993, s 35(3).)

The number of Māori electorates is calculated by dividing the Māori electoral population (MEP) of New Zealand by the South Island Quota. Māori voters may choose to either be represented in a Māori electorate or a general electorate, so the MEP is influenced by the number of Māori who opt for Māori electorate representation. Māori voters who choose to be represented in a general electorate are included in the General electoral population (GEP) of either the South Island or North Island. The number of North Island electorates is calculated by applying the South Island Quota to the North Island GEP. In this way, all three types of electorates will represent similar populations. Electorates may vary by no more than 5% of the average electoral population size.

In drawing new electorate boundaries, the Representation Commission must give due consideration to existing boundaries, communities of interest, facilities of communications, topographical features, and projected variation in population. Regard is often had for local authority boundaries. The Commission may abolish electorates and create new ones in their place. Except for Māori electorates, electorates must be wholly situated on either the North Island or South Island. Populations on other islands, such as Stewart Island / Rakiura and the Chatham Islands, are included by convention in electorates that provide access to the mainland, latterly Invercargill and Rongotai, respectively.

== Naming conventions ==
The Representation Commission determines the names of each electorate following the most recent census. An electorate may be named after a geographic region, landmark (e.g. a mountain) or main population area. The Commission adopts compass point names when there is not a more suitable name. The compass point reference usually follows the name of the main population centre, e.g. Hamilton East.

== Special electorates ==
Two types of special electorates have been used.

=== Goldminers' electorates ===
Goldminers' electorates were created for participants in the Otago and West Coast gold rushes. Goldminers did not usually meet the residency and property requirements in the electorate they were prospecting in, but were numerous enough to warrant political representation. A total of three goldminers' electorates existed, all of which were abolished in the 1870 redistricting.

=== Māori electorates ===
Much more durable have been the Māori electorates, created in 1867 to give separate representation to Māori. Although originally intended to be temporary, they came to function as reserved positions for Māori until 1967, ensuring that there would always be a Māori voice in Parliament. In 1967 the reserved status of the Māori seats was removed, allowing non-Māori to stand in the Māori electorates. Until 1993 the number of Māori electorates was fixed at four, significantly under-representing Māori in Parliament. In 1975 the definition of who could opt to register on either the general or the Māori roll was expanded to include all persons of Māori descent. Previously all persons of more than 50% Māori ancestry were on the Māori roll while persons of less than 50% Māori ancestry were required to enrol on the then European roll. Only persons presumed to have equal Māori and European ancestry (so-called half-castes) had a choice of roll.

Since the introduction of MMP in 1996, the number of seats can change with the number of Māori voters who choose to go on the Māori roll rather than the general roll. In 1996, there were five Māori electorates. For the 1999 election, this increased to six electorates. Since the 2002 election, the number of Māori electorates has stayed constant at seven.

== Electorates in the 54th Parliament ==
New Zealand electorates used in 2023, showing 2023 election results

This table shows the electorates as they were represented during the 54th New Zealand Parliament.

=== General electorates ===
Electorate	Region	Namesake	MP	Party
Auckland Central	Auckland	Auckland	Chlöe Swarbrick	Green
Banks Peninsula	Canterbury	Banks Peninsula	Vanessa Weenink	National
Bay of Plenty	Bay of Plenty	Bay of Plenty	Tom Rutherford	National
Botany	Auckland	Botany Downs	Christopher Luxon	National
Christchurch Central	Canterbury	Christchurch	Duncan Webb	Labour
Christchurch East	Canterbury	Christchurch	Reuben Davidson	Labour
Coromandel	Waikato	Coromandel Peninsula	Scott Simpson	National
Dunedin	Otago	Dunedin	Rachel Brooking	Labour
East Coast	Gisborne and Bay of Plenty	East Coast	Dana Kirkpatrick	National
East Coast Bays	Auckland	East Coast Bays	Erica Stanford	National
Epsom	Auckland	Epsom	David Seymour	ACT
Hamilton East	Waikato	Hamilton	Ryan Hamilton	National
Hamilton West	Waikato	Hamilton	Tama Potaka	National
Hutt South	Wellington	Hutt Valley	Chris Bishop	National
Ilam	Canterbury	Ilam	Hamish Campbell	National
Invercargill	Southland	Invercargill	Penny Simmonds	National
Kaikōura	Marlborough and Canterbury	Kaikōura	Stuart Smith	National
Kaipara ki Mahurangi	Auckland	Kaipara Harbour and Mahurangi Harbour	Chris Penk	National
Kelston	Auckland	Kelston	Carmel Sepuloni	Labour
Mana	Wellington	Mana Island	Barbara Edmonds	Labour
Māngere	Auckland	Māngere	Lemauga Lydia Sosene	Labour
Manurewa	Auckland	Manurewa	Arena Williams	Labour
Maungakiekie	Auckland	Maungakiekie / One Tree Hill	Greg Fleming	National
Mt Albert	Auckland	Mount Albert	Helen White	Labour
Mt Roskill	Auckland	Mount Roskill	Carlos Cheung	National
Napier	Hawke's Bay	Napier	Katie Nimon	National
Nelson	Nelson and Tasman	Nelson	Rachel Boyack	Labour
New Lynn	Auckland	New Lynn	Paulo Garcia	National
New Plymouth	Taranaki	New Plymouth	David MacLeod	National
North Shore	Auckland	North Shore	Simon Watts	National
Northcote	Auckland	Northcote	Dan Bidois	National
Northland	Northland	Northland Region	Grant McCallum	National
Ōhāriu	Wellington	Ohariu	Greg O'Connor	Labour
Ōtaki	Wellington and Manawatū-Whanganui	Ōtaki River	Tim Costley	National
Pakuranga	Auckland	Pakuranga	Simeon Brown	National
Palmerston North	Manawatū-Whanganui	Palmerston North	Tangi Utikere	Labour
Panmure-Ōtāhuhu	Auckland	Panmure and Ōtāhuhu	Jenny Salesa	Labour
Papakura	Auckland	Papakura	Judith Collins	National
Port Waikato	Auckland and Waikato	Port Waikato	Andrew Bayly	National
Rangitata	Canterbury	Rangitata River	James Meager	National
Rangitīkei	Manawatū-Whanganui	Rangitīkei River	Suze Redmayne	National
Remutaka	Wellington	Remutaka Range	Chris Hipkins	Labour
Rongotai	Wellington and the Chatham Islands	Rongotai	Julie Anne Genter	Green
Rotorua	Bay of Plenty	Rotorua	Todd McClay	National
Selwyn	Canterbury	Selwyn River	Nicola Grigg	National
Southland	Southland and Otago	Southland Region	Joseph Mooney	National
Taieri	Otago	Taieri River	Ingrid Leary	Labour
Takanini	Auckland	Takanini	Rima Nakhle	National
Tāmaki	Auckland	Tamaki River	Brooke van Velden	ACT
Taranaki-King Country	Taranaki and Waikato	Taranaki region and King Country	Barbara Kuriger	National
Taupō	Waikato	Lake Taupō	Louise Upston	National
Tauranga	Bay of Plenty	Tauranga	Sam Uffindell	National
Te Atatū	Auckland	Te Atatū Peninsula	Phil Twyford	Labour
Tukituki	Hawke's Bay	Tukituki River	Catherine Wedd	National
Upper Harbour	Auckland	Upper Waitematā Harbour	Cameron Brewer	National
Waikato	Waikato	Waikato River	Tim van de Molen	National
Waimakariri	Canterbury	Waimakariri River	Matt Doocey	National
Wairarapa	Wellington, Manawatū-Whanganui and Hawke's Bay	Lake Wairarapa	Mike Butterick	National
Waitaki	Otago and Canterbury	Waitaki River	Miles Anderson	National
Wellington Central	Wellington	Wellington	Tamatha Paul	Green
West Coast-Tasman	West Coast and Tasman	West Coast region and Tasman district	Maureen Pugh	National
Whanganui	Manawatū-Whanganui and Taranaki	Whanganui River	Carl Bates	National
Whangaparāoa	Auckland	Whangaparāoa Peninsula	Mark Mitchell	National
Whangārei	Northland	Whangārei	Shane Reti	National
Wigram	Canterbury	Wigram	Megan Woods	Labour

=== Māori electorates ===
Electorate	Region	Namesake/translation	MP	Party
Te Tai Tokerau	Northland and Auckland	"northern district"	Mariameno Kapa-Kingi	Māori
Tāmaki Makaurau	Auckland	"Tāmaki desired by many" (the Māori name for Auckland)	Oriini Kaipara	Māori
Hauraki-Waikato	Auckland and Waikato	Hauraki Gulf and Waikato River	Hana-Rawhiti Maipi-Clarke	Māori
Waiariki	Bay of Plenty and Waikato	"chiefly waters"	Rawiri Waititi	Māori
Ikaroa-Rāwhiti	Hawke's Bay, Gisborne, Manawatū-Whanganui and Wellington	long (roa) eastern (rāwhiti) electorate of the North Island / Te Ika-a-Māui	Cushla Tangaere-Manuel	Labour
Te Tai Hauāuru	Taranaki, Waikato, Manawatū-Whanganui and Wellington	"western district"	Debbie Ngarewa-Packer	Māori
Te Tai Tonga	The South Island, Wellington and the Chatham Islands	"southern district"	Tākuta Ferris	Māori
