= Ryan Hamilton (New Zealand politician) =

New Zealand National Party politician (born 1979 or 1980)

Ryan Hamilton MP
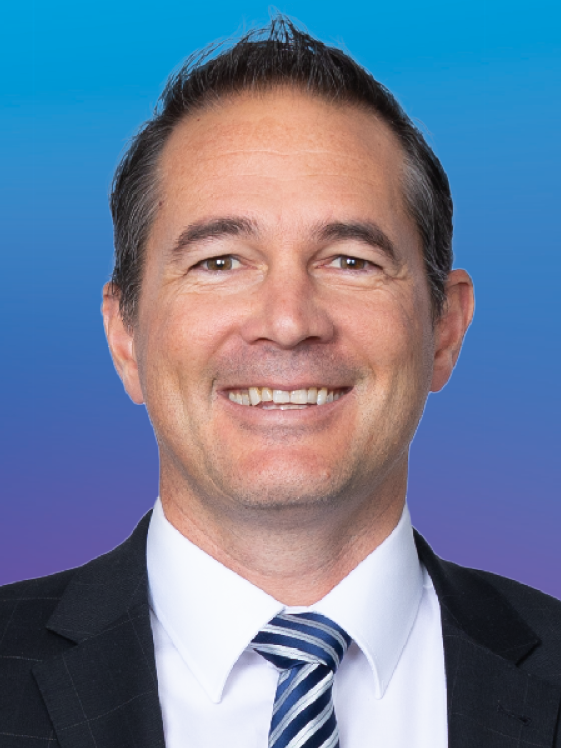
- Hamilton in 2023

Member of the New Zealand Parliament for Hamilton East
- Incumbent
- Assumed office 14 October 2023
- Preceded by: Jamie Strange

Hamilton City Councillor for the East Ward
- In office 22 February 2018 – October 2023
- Preceded by: Philip Yeung
- Succeeded by: Tim Macindoe

Personal details
- Born: 1979 or 1980 (age 46–47)
- Party: National
- Spouse: Marie
- Children: 3
- Education: University of Waikato

Ryan Alexander Hamilton (born 1979 or 1980) is a New Zealand politician. He has been the Member of Parliament for Hamilton East representing the National Party since the 2023 general election. He was a Hamilton city councillor from 2018 until resigning following his election to Parliament.

== Political career ==
=== Hamilton City Council ===
Hamilton unsuccessfully ran for the Hamilton City Council in 2004, 2010, and 2016. He also unsuccessfully ran for election to the WEL Energy Trust and the Waikato District Health Board. He was finally elected to the council in a February 2018 by-election following the death of councillor Philip Yeung. He was elected to a full term in 2019 and in 2022 was the highest-polling councillor in the East Ward.

During the COVID-19 pandemic, he was the only councillor to vote against requiring My Vaccine Pass to enter council facilities.

He formally resigned from his seat on the Council in October 2023 following his election to Parliament.

=== Member of Parliament ===
New Zealand Parliament
Years	Term	Electorate	List	Party
2023–2026	54th	Hamilton East	66	National

Hamilton expressed interest in being the National candidate for Hamilton East in August 2022 following David Bennett's decision to retire. He was selected as the candidate in February 2023 and placed 66th on the 2023 party list. During the election campaign there was a media exposé on Hamilton's social media history linking him to conspiracy theories about fluoridation in drinking water and others relating to COVID-19 including calling vaccine mandates illegal. Hamilton did not respond to media interview requests but the National Party released an unsolicited statement in Hamilton's name apologising for his past comments.

On election night, Hamilton won the Hamilton East electorate, defeating Labour's candidate Georgie Dansey by 5,060 votes. He delivered his maiden statement on 7 December 2023 and was appointed as a member of the finance and expenditure committee and as deputy chair of the regulations review committee.

During the 2026 New Zealand general election, Hamilton contested Hamilton East for National. He was ranked 35th on the National Party list. Based on preliminary results released on 8 November, Hamilton retained Hamilton East by a narrow margin of 456 votes. Due to the narrow margin between Hamilton and his Labour contender Dansey, the results may change with the release of final results on 27 November.

== Personal life ==
Hamilton is married with three children. His mother, Mavora Hamilton, also served as a Hamilton City Councillor.

New Zealand Parliament
Preceded by Jamie Strange	Member of Parliament for Hamilton East; 2023–present	Incumbent
