= Tama Potaka =

New Zealand politician (born 1976)

The Honourable Tama Potaka MP
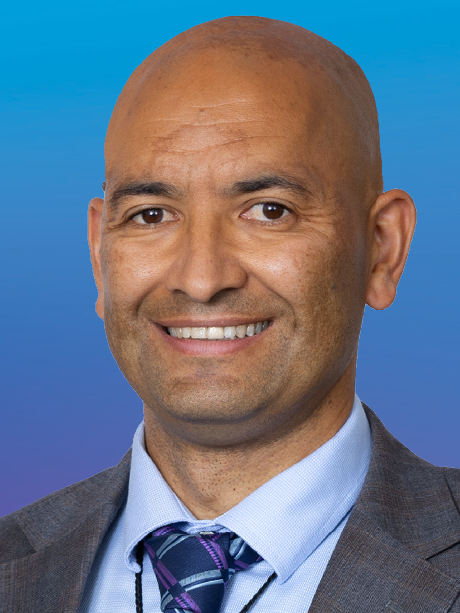
- Potaka in 2023

46th Minister for Māori Development
- Incumbent
- Assumed office 27 November 2023
- Prime Minister: Christopher Luxon
- Preceded by: Willie Jackson

17th Minister of Conservation
- Incumbent
- Assumed office 27 November 2023
- Prime Minister: Christopher Luxon
- Preceded by: Willow-Jean Prime

Member of the New Zealand Parliament for Hamilton West
- Incumbent
- Assumed office 10 December 2022
- Preceded by: Gaurav Sharma
- Majority: 2,433

Personal details
- Born: Tama William Potaka; 8 January 1976 (age 50) Raetihi, New Zealand
- Party: National
- Spouse: Ariana Paul (m. 2008)
- Children: 3
- Education: Victoria University of Wellington; Columbia University

Tama William Potaka (born 8 January 1976) is a New Zealand politician and Member of Parliament in the House of Representatives representing the Hamilton West electorate. He is a member of the National Party and was chief executive of Ngāi Tai ki Tāmaki before entering Parliament.

== Early life and career ==
Potaka was born in Raetihi in 1976. He has Māori ancestry through both of his parents, who were schoolteachers, and he affiliates to Ngāti Hauiti, Whanganui, Taranaki, and Ngāti Toa. He was educated at Huntley School and Te Aute College, where he was classmates with Julian Wilcox, Aidan Warren, Billy Weepu, Karl Te Nana and Alistair Toto and became dux in 1993. He received Bachelor of Arts and Bachelor of Laws degrees from Victoria University of Wellington in 1999, and with a scholarship earned a Master of Laws from Columbia University. He passed the bar exam and became an attorney at Simpson Thacher & Bartlett in New York City.

Potaka is a graduate of Te Panekiretanga o Te Reo Māori.

Potaka worked for Rudd, Watts and Stone (now Minter Ellison), various public policy roles, with Lake Taupō Funds, and Bell Gully. Potaka then spent seven years based in Hamilton, working as general manager corporate services for Tainui Group Holdings. He subsequently moved back to Auckland where he was a senior advisor at the New Zealand Superannuation Fund. He was appointed chief executive officer of Ngāi Tai ki Tāmaki Trust in 2020. In 2021, he was chosen as one of four lead negotiators for the Mōkai Pātea Treaty of Waitangi claim.

== Political career ==
New Zealand Parliament
Years	Term	Electorate		Party
2022–2023	53rd	Hamilton West		National
2023–2026	54th	Hamilton West	24	National
2026–present	55th	Hamilton West	11	National

=== First term, 2022–2023 ===
On 6 November 2022, Potaka was selected as the National Party candidate for the 2022 Hamilton West by-election caused by the resignation of independent MP Gaurav Sharma who had been expelled from the Labour Party. During the by-election campaign, Potaka stated that Hamilton had become known as the "ramraid capital of New Zealand" in response to the nationwide surge in ram raids in 2022. He also said that he wanted "Hamilton West to be the best city to grow up and grow old in."

On 10 December 2022, Potaka won the election, beating Labour candidate Georgie Dansey. Potaka gained 6974 votes compared to Dansey's 4541, a margin of 2433.

On 19 January 2023, Potaka was named as National's spokesperson for Māori development and associate spokesperson for housing.

=== Second term, 2023–present ===
During the 2023 New Zealand general election held on 14 October, Potaka retained Hamilton West by a margin of 6,488 votes over Labour candidate Myra Williamson.

Following the formation of the Sixth National Government of New Zealand, Potaka was appointed as Minister of Conservation, Minister for Māori Crown Relations: Te Arawhiti, Minister for Māori Development, Minister for Whānau Ora, and Associate Minister of Housing (Social Housing)

==== Māori issues ====
On 15 January 2024, Potaka and Prime Minister Christopher Luxon met with the Māori King Tūheitia Paki to discuss several of the Government's policies concerning Māori including the proposed Treaty Principles legislation and plans to roll back the use of Māori language in the public service. On 20 January, Potaka and fellow National MP Dan Bidois attended a national hui of unity convened by King Tūheitia at Turangawaewae Marae. Potaka defended Luxon's decision not to attend the national hui and disputed several of the speakers' claims that the Government was underpinned by White supremacy.

On 13 August 2024, Potaka as Minister for Māori Crown Relations announced that Te Puni Kōkiri (the Ministry for Māori Development) would assume Te Arawhiti's (the Office for Māori Crown Relations) monitoring and Treaty settlements compliance functions. This decision was criticised by Te Pāti Māori co-leader Debbie Ngarewa-Packer, the Green Party's Māori Crown Relations spokesperson Steve Abel and the Labour Party's Peeni Henare, who described it as a "backward step" in the New Zealand Crown's relationship with Māori.

On 17 January 2025, Potaka as Minister for Māori Development announced an overhaul of the Waitangi Tribunal's membership. He appointed eight new members including Rangitāne Tū Mai Rā Trust general manager Tipene Crisp, lawyer and New Zealand On Air board member Philip Crump, Ngāti Raukawa Treaty negotiator Vanessa Eparaima, veteran public servant Rex Edward Hale, Manawatū District Councillor Grant Hadfield, Tupuora Education founder and managing director Kingi Kiriona, former Defence Minister and Mayor of Carterton Ron Mark, and University of Waikato law Professor Tafaoimalo Tologata Leilani Tuala-Warren. In addition, Potaka renewed the warrants of six existing Tribunal members including Ruakere Hond, Derek Fox, Kim Ngarimu, Hana O'Regan, Pou Temara and Kevin Prime. In response, Te Pāti Māori co-leader Debbie Ngarewa-Packer described the removal of several well known Māori academics as a "whitewash." In response, Potaka said that Ngarewa-Packer's comments were "unhelpful" and "undermined the knowledge and experience of the new appointees."

On 9 May 2025 Potaka, in his capacity as Māori Development Minister, announced that an "independent technical advisory group" would review the Treaty of Waitangi Act 1975, which governs the scope of the Waitangi Tribunal. The National-led government had committed to reviewing the scope of the Waitangi Tribunal as part of its coalition agreements with the allied ACT and New Zealand First parties.

On 1 October 2025, Potaka appointed seven leaders to the boards of several Māori entities: Te Rina Warren to Te Mātāwai, Mahanga Pihama and Jeremy Tātere MacLeod to the Māori Language Commission, Reikura Kahi as Te Māngai Pāho's chair and Kingi Kiriona as deputy chair, Reikura Kahi to Te Māngai Pāho, Mark Gray to the Poutama Trust and Juliet Tainui-Hernandez to the Waitangi Tribunal.

==== Conservation ====
On 3 September 2024, Potaka as Minister of Conservation and Minister of Tourism and Hospitality Matt Doocey announced that the International Visitor Conservation and Tourism Levy (IVL) would be increased to NZ$100 to fund tourism-related infrastructure and services. On 14 October, Potaka as Minister of Conservation announced 19 new marine protection areas in the Hauraki Gulf.

On 20 November 2025, Potaka confirmed that feral cats would be added to Predator Free 2050's target list of exotic species. Feral cats had previously been excluded from the scope of Predator Free 2050 due to opposition from cat owners.

In February 2026, Potaka announced the introduction of entry fees for foreign tourists at four of New Zealand's most popular natural attractions. The measure aims to generate funding for conservation projects while boosting employment opportunities.

As Conservation Minister, Potaka sponsored the Conservation Amendment Bill, which would allow the New Zealand Government to charge foreign tourists fees for visiting premium natural areas. Opposition politicians including Labour's conservation spokesperson Priyanca Radhakrishnan, Greens co-leader Marama Davidson and Te Pāti Māori co-leader Rawiri Waititi expressed concern that it would open about 60 percent of conservation land for sale and change the way that Treaty of Waitangi settlements are interpreted. The bill passed its first reading on 13 May 2026 by a margin of 68 to 54 votes, with the governing coalition supporting it and opposition parties opposing it. In late June 2026, Potaka withdrew controversial disposal and exchange clauses from the Conservation Amendment Bill, stating that the bill's intention was never to facilitate the large-scale disposal of conservation land.

==== Housing ====
As Associate Minister of Housing with responsibility for social housing, Potaka led the Government's efforts to reduce the number of families living in emergency housing motels and move them into social housing. The Government also tightened the eligibility criteria for emergency housing applicants. In late November, Potaka announced that the number of households living in emergency housing had dropped from 3,141 in December 2023 to 993 in October 2024. By December 2024, the number of households living in emergency housing had dropped to 591. Potaka confirmed that 80% of former emergency housing residents had moved into social, transitional, or private housing but was unable to account for the whereabouts of the remaining 20%, saying "that they did not have to tell their providers where they were going."

On 15 June 2025, Potaka announced that the Ministry of Housing and Urban Development would be collaborating with the Rotorua Lakes Council and community housing providers to build 189 homes (150 social homes and 39 affordable rentals) by mid-2027. The 150 social homes would be funded through a NZ$140 million housing allocation from the 2024 New Zealand budget while the 39 rentals would be funded through a separate NZ$200 million package to deliver 400 affordable homes in high needs areas. Potaka also confirmed that the Government planned to close down all remaining emergency housing motels in Rotorua by late 2025.

==== 2026 general election ====
During the 2026 New Zealand general election, Potaka contested the Hamilton West electorate and was ranked 11th place on National's party list.

During the election campaign, Stuff reported on 24 October that Potaka had posed for a photograph with patched members of the Mongrel Mob during Māori King Tūheitia Paki's Hui ā-motu event in January 2024. This photograph was released amidst controversy in October 2026 around several Green, Te Pāti Māori and Labour candidates posing with members of the Mongrel Mob while canvassing. Adopting a tough on crime approach, National had criticised the opposition parties for fraternising with gang members and being "soft on crime." In response, Potaka told Stuff that one of the individuals was a former school pupil and that they were attending a public event prior to the passage of the Gangs Act 2024, which banned gang patches. Prime Minister Luxon and Police Minister Mark Mitchell defended Potaka, saying that he was not campaigning or fundraising among gang members unlike opposition candidates.

On 7 November, he retained Hamilton West by a large margin of 2,181 votes.

== Personal life ==
Potaka married Ariana Paul in 2008, and they have three children. Maori Party MP Takutai Tarsh Kemp was a relative.
