= Gaurav Sharma (politician) =

Former New Zealand politician

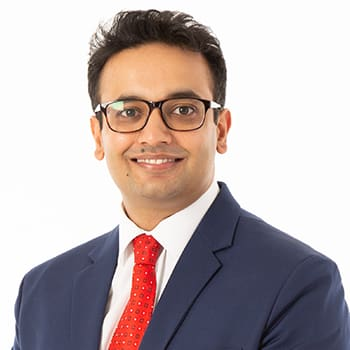

Member of the New Zealand Parliament for Hamilton West
- In office 17 October 2020 – 18 October 2022
- Preceded by: Tim Macindoe
- Succeeded by: Tama Potaka

Personal details
- Born: Gaurav Mrinal Sharma; 1987 (age 38–39) Himachal Pradesh, India
- Party: Momentum (2022–present); Independent (2022); Labour (until 2022)
- Education: University of Auckland; George Washington University
- Profession: Medical practitioner

Gaurav Mrinal Sharma (born 1987) is a New Zealand doctor and former Member of Parliament. Elected in 2020, Sharma was a Member of Parliament (MP) for the Labour Party, representing the electorate of Hamilton West. In August 2022, he made allegations of bullying within the Labour Party, and was expelled from its caucus in the same month. He briefly served as an independent, before resigning from Parliament in October 2022. He announced the formation of the New Zealand Momentum Party, an unregistered political party, in November 2022. In December, Sharma contested and lost the 2022 Hamilton West by-election to National MP Tama Potaka.

== Early life and schooling ==
Sharma was born in Himachal Pradesh, India, and his family moved to New Zealand when he was 12 years old. Sharma went to Auckland Grammar School where he was the proxime accessit to the dux in his final year of high school. In 2005, The New Zealand Herald named him as one of the top six students in the country as per Sir John Graham's NZ Education and Scholarship Trust.

He has a Bachelor of Medicine, Bachelor of Surgery degree from the University of Auckland and a Master of Business Administration from George Washington University.

== Medical career ==
Volunteer work as a caregiver in a rest home when he was in high school inspired Sharma to pursue a career in medicine. Sharma qualified as a medical doctor from University of Auckland's School of Medicine in 2011 where he was also involved with the New Zealand Medical Students' Association. Sharma undertook an internship with the World Health Organization in 2012, working within the Non-Communicable Diseases unit.

When he returned from Geneva, Sharma practised medicine in different hospitals across Auckland until 2015. Sharma has been registered with the Medical Council of New Zealand under a general scope requiring he practise under supervision in the GPEP training programme. His certificate to practise expired on 31 August 2022, and was renewed in 2023 after his political career ended.

=== Fulbright and MBA ===
In 2015, Sharma received the Fulbright Scholarship to complete an MBA at George Washington University in Washington DC, with a specific focus on business, politics and public health. During this time, Sharma was involved on campus in Hillary Clinton's campaign for the United States Presidency in 2016. He was also a Senator on the George Washington University's Student Senate during his time there as a student.

== Political career ==
=== Start of career and election to parliament ===
New Zealand Parliament
Years	Term	Electorate	List	Party
2020–2022	53rd	Hamilton West	63	Labour
2022	Changed allegiance to:			Independent

Sharma worked for Phil Goff's campaign in the 2014 election. Upon returning from the United States after his MBA, Sharma stood for the Labour Party in the Hamilton West electorate in the 2017 election and was placed 70th on Labour's party list. He did not win a seat; he received 31% of the electorate vote compared to the incumbent's 52%. Following his loss, Sharma practised as a GP in Hamilton for two years.

In the 2020 election Sharma again stood for the Hamilton West electorate. This time, Sharma won the seat, receiving 52% of the electorate vote. Sharma was the first MP to take the Oath of Allegiance in Sanskrit, after first completing it in te reo Māori. Sharma was the first MP of Indian origin to represent an electorate for the Labour Party.

=== Roles in parliament ===
As well as representing his electorate, Sharma was a member of the Health Select Committee.

=== Allegations of bullying within Parliament ===
On 11 August 2022, Sharma wrote an opinion piece for The New Zealand Herald newspaper in which he alleged widespread bullying within Parliament. The piece included specific allegations aimed at party whips, party leadership, and the Parliamentary Service. The next day, he expanded on these allegations with a Facebook post detailing specific grievances against Labour Whip Duncan Webb, former Whip Kieran McAnulty, and the office of Prime Minister Jacinda Ardern.

In the following days and weeks, Sharma continued to publish allegations, such as another Facebook post on 15 August, and a further post of 29 August, in which Sharma published a 4,700 word social media post detailing his complaints with the work performance of three former staff members and accused the Parliamentary Service of fabricating information about him.

In October 2022, The Spinoff claimed Sharma had presented little in the way of evidence to back his allegations of bullying and harassment.

=== Responses to allegations ===
==== Government responses ====
Parliamentary Service chief executive Rafael Gonzalez-Montero disputed Sharma's allegations and defended his organisation's work on countering bullying within parliament. Labour Party MPs, including Damien O'Connor, Chris Hipkins, and Anahila Kanongata'a-Suisuiki, questioned Sharma's claims.

The Parliamentary Service rebutted one of Sharma's allegations that another Labour MP and a parliamentary staff member had misspent taxpayer money in August 2021. Gonzalez-Montero responded that the duo had travelled to the MP's electorate for the purposes of team-building, which he described as a normal procedure for MPs who were establishing a new team within their electorates.

On 19 August, Newshub reported that the Chief Ombudsman Peter Boshier had sent a letter to Ardern querying Sharma's allegations that Labour MPs had been trained to circumvent the Official Information Act 1982.

==== Support ====
National Party MPs Matt Doocey, Chris Bishop, and Chris Penk claimed that Sharma's allegations raised questions about alleged bullying and victimising within the Labour Party. Twenty members of Sharma's Hamilton West electorate committee sent a letter to the Labour Party and Labour parliamentary caucus defending Sharma and calling for an independent investigation into his bullying allegations.

==== Accusations against Sharma ====
Following the allegations, an employment dispute from Sharma's office became public. The employment matter centred on a former staffer who felt bullied by Sharma; that they were being isolated from other staffers by him and subsequently sought therapy after it. Sharma, however, said that their contract was not extended because of poor employment performance. Gonzalez-Montero, Webb, and Ardern confirmed that their offices were working with Sharma to resolve an employment dispute in his parliamentary office. The New Zealand Herald reported that three of Sharma's staff members had resigned during his first year after raising concerns about him; which allegedly prompted the Parliamentary Service to suspend the hiring of new staff for Sharma's parliamentary office.

In response to Sharma's Facebook post of 29 August, a former staff member accused Sharma of breaching confidentiality rules and bringing back past trauma.

=== Expulsion from Labour ===
On 15 August, Ardern confirmed that the Labour Party parliamentary caucus would be holding a special meeting that week to discuss Sharma's bullying allegations. That same day, Sharma also claimed that he was being silenced after Labour leaders ordered him to raise his concerns with party whips and leaders and to avoid speaking with the media.

On the evening of 15 August, the Labour Party held a Zoom meeting for all its MPs except Sharma, to discuss Sharma's future within the party. Sharma found out about this meeting after "accidentally" receiving a message with a photo of fellow Labour MP Kelvin Davis on Zoom call. Prior to that, Sharma had agreed to attend a special caucus meeting on 16 August to discuss Sharma's bullying allegations. After learning about the evening meeting on 15 August, Sharma refused to attend the 16 August meeting and claimed that his fate had been "pre-determined." During the special caucus meeting held on 16 August, Labour MPs voted unanimously to suspend Sharma from the party caucus effective immediately until December 2022. While Sharma would remain the Labour MP for Hamilton West, he was excluded from caucus events.

Ardern defended Sharma's suspension, claiming it was an appropriate response to what she described as his "repeated breaches of trust." Ardern also claimed that Sharma had rejected the party's offers of coaching, mentoring and temporary staff over the past 18 months. In return, Sharma had accused the Labour leadership of ignoring his concerns, gaslighting him, and creating a cover-up culture. Sharma accused the Prime Minister of lying "every step of the way".

In an interview with public broadcaster Radio New Zealand on 17 August, Sharma claimed he had recorded an hour-long phone conversation with a senior Labour MP, who called him after the 15 August meeting to warn his fate was sealed and multiple times tell him the decision made by the Labour caucus on 16 August was pre-determined. Asked if he would stay in Parliament if he was expelled from the Labour caucus, Sharma admitted "I haven't thought this through to that".

In mid August, Ardern indicated that Sharma would face a motion to expel him from the Labour Party caucus for breaching party protocol. However, she ruled out using the Electoral (Integrity) Amendment Act 2018, colloquially known as the waka-jumping act, to expel Sharma from Parliament. Ardern stated this was to avoid the "unnecessary burden" on taxpayers by triggering a by-election. Ardern also refused Sharma's appeal for an independent inquiry, claiming that his allegations were unfounded. Ardern also indicated that the Party would consider expelling him from the Labour Party.

On 23 August, Ardern confirmed that the Labour caucus had voted to expel Sharma permanently from its caucus. She added that the caucus had also voted to refer the matter to the New Zealand Council of the Labour Party for them to consider any further disciplinary action. Being expelled from the Labour caucus meant that Sharma was an independent MP, still representing his electorate.

On 24 August, during the election of the new Speaker of the House Adrian Rurawhe, Sharma used parliamentary privilege to accuse the outgoing Speaker Trevor Mallard of ignoring his concerns about bullying within Labour and reporting his complaint to the Labour Whips' office. Sharma was halted during his speech by Rurawhe and told to sit down for going off topic.

On 19 October 2022, party president Claire Szabó confirmed Sharma had been expelled from the party and stated that the party had not considered invoking waka-jumping rules to remove him from Parliament. Szabó also confirmed an investigation had taken place into alleged misconduct by Sharma, which he had participated in, while also saying that Sharma had released the details of the investigation after ignoring a confidentiality requirement. On 20 October 2022, the New Zealand Council, Labour's governing body, expelled Sharma from the party with immediate effect. In a statement, party president Szabó said the council "took this decision because it found Gaurav Sharma had brought the party into disrepute", a breach of the party's constitution.

=== Resignation, by-election, and launch of the Momentum Party ===
On 18 October 2022, Sharma announced on his Facebook page that he had resigned from Parliament, and that he would contest the by-election for Hamilton West that would result from this. Sharma also used the post to announce his intentions to start a new "centrist" political party.

Sharma claimed that Labour planned to use the waka-jumping legislation to force him out of Parliament six months before the 2023 New Zealand general election, and that this would mean a by-election could be avoided. Sharma also used the post to announce his intentions to start a new "centrist" political party. Labour leader Jacinda Ardern denied that the party was considering acting to remove Sharma from Parliament, saying she did not know on what basis Sharma believed this.

The by-election was held on 10 December 2022, with writ day designated as 2 November. Sharma's campaign for re-election was financially supported by Roshan Nauhria, one of New Zealand's richest Indian businessmen and who was previously the leader of the New Zealand People's Party. During the campaign period Sharma launched the New Zealand Momentum Party, claiming that most of his core campaign team had left Labour for Momentum. While the party wasn't registered, Sharma said that 800 people had an intention to join it.

Sharma lost the Hamilton West by-election, which was won by the National Party candidate Tama Potaka. Sharma came fourth place with 1,242 votes.

== Later career ==
After losing his re-election campaign, Sharma returned to work as a general practice doctor and opened a new medical practice in Frankton, Hamilton in 2024.

== See also ==
- Kaushaliya Vaghela (similar case in Australia)

New Zealand Parliament
Preceded by Tim Macindoe	Member of Parliament for Hamilton West; 2020–2022	Succeeded by Tama Potaka
