= Hamilton East (New Zealand electorate) =

- Single-member general constituency for the New Zealand House of Representatives
- Interactive map of boundaries from the 2026 election
- Formation: 1972
- Region: Waikato
- Character: Urban and suburban
- Term: 3 years

Member for Hamilton East
- TBD
- Previous MP: Jamie Strange (Labour)
Party vote distribution

Hamilton East is a New Zealand parliamentary electorate. Together with Hamilton West, it is one of the country's bellwether seats. Ryan Hamilton of the National Party won Hamilton East in the 2023 general election. Based on preliminary results, Hamilton has held the electorate in the 2026 general election, but the result may change with the final vote count expected for 27 November.

== Population centres ==
Map of boundaries at the 2020 and 2023 general elections

Since the 1969 election, the number of electorates in the South Island was fixed at 25, with continued faster population growth in the North Island leading to an increase in the number of general electorates. There were 84 electorates for the 1969 election, and the 1972 electoral redistribution saw three additional general seats created for the North Island, bringing the total number of electorates to 87. Together with increased urbanisation in Christchurch and Nelson, the changes proved very disruptive to existing electorates. In the South Island, three electorates were abolished, and three electorates were newly created. In the North Island, five electorates were abolished, two electorates were recreated, and six electorates were newly created (including Hamilton East).

The earlier Hamilton electorate dates from 1922. In 1969 Hamilton West was split off; that electorate initially extended to the west coast. In 1972 the additional electorate of Hamilton East was created, and Hamilton was abolished.

The electorate is mainly urban, and covers the eastern part of the city of Hamilton. The Waikato River divides the city in half and forms the boundary between the Hamilton East and Hamilton West electorates, except part of the Flagstaff area moved into Hamilton West as part of the changes of the 2014 boundary review. Only one other electorate borders Hamilton East, the rural Waikato electorate to the east.

Hamilton East includes the suburbs of Rototuna, Flagstaff, Huntington, Harrowfield, Queenwood, Chedworth Park, Fairfield, Fairview Downs, Enderley, Claudelands, Hamilton East, Hillcrest, Silverdale and Riverlea.

Hamilton East is home to the University of Waikato, and 11.3% of the electorate's workforce is employed in education and training, the second-highest proportion in the country. The majority of households are families, and the median family income is NZ$61,500, which is $2,500 higher than the national median.

== History ==
Nearly every party since 1972 that has won Hamilton East and its sister seat of Hamilton West has gone on to form the government, earning these seats a reputation as bellwether seats. One notable exception was in 1993, when Labour captured both Hamilton seats from National, but failed to win a parliamentary majority. In recent years, such as the 1999 and 2005 elections, Hamilton East has been won more often by a National candidate, despite the Labour Party forming the government. In the 2026 general election, Ryan Hamilton of the National Party has held the electorate based on preliminary results, but The New Zealand Herald considers this as one of five electorates where the result may change with the final vote count expected for 27 November. Hamilton is ahead of Labour's Georgie Dansey by 456 votes.

=== Members of Parliament ===
Unless otherwise stated, all MPs terms began and ended at general elections.

Key

Labour National NZ First

Election	Winner
1972 election	Rufus Rogers
1975 election	Ian Shearer
1978 election	Ian Shearer
1981 election	Ian Shearer
1984 election	Bill Dillon
1987 election	Bill Dillon
1990 election	Tony Steel
1993 election	Dianne Yates
1996 election	Tony Steel
1999 election	Tony Steel
2002 election	Dianne Yates
2005 election	David Bennett
2008 election	David Bennett
2011 election	David Bennett
2014 election	David Bennett
2017 election	David Bennett
2020 election	Jamie Strange
2023 election	Ryan Hamilton (provisional for 2026)
2026 election	Ryan Hamilton (provisional for 2026)

=== List MPs ===
Members of Parliament elected from party lists in elections where that person also unsuccessfully contested the Hamilton East electorate. Unless otherwise stated, all MPs terms began and ended at general elections.

Election	Winner
1996 election	Doug Woolerton
1996 election	Dianne Yates
1999 election	Doug Woolerton
1999 election	Dianne Yates
2002 election	Doug Woolerton
2005 election	Doug Woolerton
2005 election	Dianne Yates^{1}
2008 election	Sue Moroney
2017 election	Jamie Strange
2020 election	David Bennett

^{1}Resigned March 2008, list seat taken by William Sio

== Election results ==
=== 2026 election ===
The next election will be held on 7 November 2026. Candidates for Hamilton East are listed at Candidates in the 2026 New Zealand general election by electorate § Hamilton East. Official results will be available after 27 November 2026.

=== 2023 election ===
2023 general election: Hamilton East
Notes:	Blue background denotes the winner of the electorate vote. Pink background denotes a candidate elected from their party list. Yellow background denotes an electorate win by a list member, or other incumbent. A ✓ or ✗ denotes status of any incumbent, win or lose respectively.						
Party	Candidate	Votes	%	±%	Party votes	%	±%
National	Ryan Hamilton	17,950	47.79	—	16,373	42.66	+15.44
Labour	Georgie Dansey	12,890	34.32	—	9,497	24.74	−24.00
ACT	Himanshu Parmar	1,679	4.47	—	3,085	8.04	+1.18
Te Pāti Māori	Awatea Parker	1,227	3.27	—	565	1.47	+0.99
NZ First	Russelle Knaap	1,206	3.21	—	1,914	4.99	+2.90
Opportunities	Alex Corkin	1,195	3.18	—	1,040	2.71	+0.54
NZ Loyal	Tanya Ban	517	1.38	—	341	0.89	—
Animal Justice	Lily Carrington	321	0.85	—	69	0.18	—
Independent	Jacobus Gielen	40	0.11	—			
Independent	Nathan Lee Couper	27	0.07	—			
Green					4,718	12.29	+4.36
NewZeal					204	0.53	+0.25 (Note: Compared to ONE Party)
Legalise Cannabis					110	0.29	−0.02
New Conservative					91	0.24	−1.75
Freedoms NZ					80	0.21	—
Women's Rights					40	0.10	—
DemocracyNZ					39	0.10	—
Leighton Baker Party					25	0.07	—
New Nation					19	0.05	—
Informal votes		509			173		
Total valid votes		37.561			38,383		
National gain from Labour	Majority	5,060	13.47	+5.95			

=== 2020 election ===
2020 general election: Hamilton East
Notes:	Blue background denotes the winner of the electorate vote. Pink background denotes a candidate elected from their party list. Yellow background denotes an electorate win by a list member, or other incumbent. A ✓ or ✗ denotes status of any incumbent, win or lose respectively.						
Party	Candidate	Votes	%	±%	Party votes	%	±%
Labour	Jamie Strange	18,542	46.92	+10.16	19,471	48.74	+13.36
National	✗ David Bennett	15,569	39.40	−13.59	10,875	27.22	−20.23
Green	Rimu Bhooi	1,676	4.24	−1.48	3,171	7.93	+1.87
Opportunities	Naomi Pocock	848	2.14	—	868	2.17	−0.99
ACT	Myah Deedman	721	1.82	+1.43	2,744	6.86	+6.25
New Conservative	Julie Manders	665	1.68	—	796	1.99	+1.79
NZ First	Stuart Husband	368	0.93	−2.18	836	2.09	−3.57
Advance NZ	Siggi Henry	298	0.75	—	291	0.72	—
Vision NZ	Destry Murphy	101	0.25	—	57	0.14	—
Independent	Matt Coleman	67	0.16	—			
RONZ	Jack Gielen	28	0.07	−0.11			
Māori Party					193	0.48	−0.06
Legalise Cannabis					126	0.31	−0.07
ONE					113	0.28	—
Outdoors					27	0.06	±0.00
TEA					20	0.05	—
Sustainable NZ					17	0.04	—
Social Credit					14	0.03	+0.01
Heartland					7	0.01	—
Informal votes		630			320		
Total valid votes		39,513			39,946		
Turnout		39,946					
Labour gain from National	Majority	2,973	7.52	−8.71			

=== 2017 election ===
2017 general election: Hamilton East
Notes:	Blue background denotes the winner of the electorate vote. Pink background denotes a candidate elected from their party list. Yellow background denotes an electorate win by a list member, or other incumbent. A ✓ or ✗ denotes status of any incumbent, win or lose respectively.						
Party	Candidate	Votes	%	±%	Party votes	%	±%
National	✓ David Bennett	18,975	52.99	−4.38	17,380	47.45	−2.58
Labour	Jamie Strange	13,165	36.76	+9.56	12,958	35.38	+11.61
Green	Sam Taylor	2,048	5.72	−1.47	2,221	6.06	−4.96
NZ First	Pita Paraone	1,113	3.11	−0.72	2,074	5.66	−1.48
ACT	James McDowall	140	0.39	−0.02	225	0.61	−0.11
RONZ	Jack Gielen	65	0.18	—			
Opportunities					1,157	3.16	—
Māori Party					199	0.54	−0.10
Legalise Cannabis					89	0.24	−0.08
Conservative					75	0.20	−4.61
United Future					29	0.08	−0.22
Outdoors					23	0.06	—
People's Party					22	0.06	—
Ban 1080					17	0.05	−0.03
Mana Party					10	0.03	—
Internet					9	0.02	—
Democrats					6	0.02	−0.01
Informal votes		304			135		
Total valid votes		35,810			36,630		
National hold	Majority	5,810	16.23	−13.94			

=== 2014 election ===
2014 general election: Hamilton East
Notes:	Blue background denotes the winner of the electorate vote. Pink background denotes a candidate elected from their party list. Yellow background denotes an electorate win by a list member, or other incumbent. A ✓ or ✗ denotes status of any incumbent, win or lose respectively.							
Party	Candidate		Votes	%	±%	Party votes	%	±%
National	✓ David Bennett		19,393	57.37	+0.26	17,395	50.03	−1.36
Labour	Cliff Allen		9,194	27.20	−4.37	8,264	23.77	−0.40
Green	Mark Servian		2,430	7.19	+1.95	3,833	11.02	−0.86
NZ First	Richard Taurima		1,296	3.83	+1.37	2,481	7.14	+1.77
Conservative	Katrina Day		991	2.93	+0.61	1,672	4.81	+1.37
Internet Mana	Ray Calver	(Internet)	217	0.64	+0.64	348	1.00	+0.73 (Note: 2014 Internet Mana swing is relative to the votes for Mana in 2011; it shared a party list with Internet in the 2014 election.)
ACT	Ron Smith		139	0.41	−0.30	250	0.72	−0.31
United Future	Quentin Todd		72	0.21	+0.21	104	0.30	−0.48
Democrats	Carolyn McKenzie		70	0.21	+0.04	29	0.08	+0.03
Māori Party						222	0.64	+0.05
Legalise Cannabis						110	0.32	−0.07
Ban 1080						28	0.08	+0.08
Civilian						23	0.07	+0.07
Focus						5	0.01	+0.01
Independent Coalition						3	0.01	+0.01
Informal votes			295			167		
Total valid votes			34,097			34,934		
National hold		Majority	10,199	30.17	+4.63			

=== 2011 election ===
2011 general election: Hamilton East
Notes:	Blue background denotes the winner of the electorate vote. Pink background denotes a candidate elected from their party list. Yellow background denotes an electorate win by a list member, or other incumbent. A ✓ or ✗ denotes status of any incumbent, win or lose respectively.						
Party	Candidate	Votes	%	±%	Party votes	%	±%
National	✓ David Bennett	18,505	57.11	−1.47	17,085	51.39	+1.88
Labour	Sehai Orgad	10,230	31.57	−0.43	8,217	24.17	−6.09
Green	Nick Marryatt	1,697	5.24	+0.92	3,942	11.88	+4.67
NZ First	Gordon Stewart	797	2.46	−0.04	1,786	5.37	+2.08
Conservative	Robyn Jackson	752	2.32	+2.32	1,145	3.44	+3.44
ACT	Garry Mallett	230	0.71	−0.56	341	1.03	−3.07
Pirate	Bruce Kingsbury	137	0.42	+0.42			
Democrats	Carolyn McKenzie	54	0.17	+0.17	18	0.05	+0.004
United Future					260	0.78	−0.57
Māori Party					195	0.59	−0.37
Legalise Cannabis					131	0.39	+0.01
Mana					89	0.27	+0.27
Libertarianz					25	0.08	+0.01
Alliance					8	0.02	−0.03
Informal votes		636			317		
Total valid votes		32,402			33,249		
National hold	Majority	8,275	25.54	−1.04			

Electorate (as at 26 November 2011): 45,420

=== 2008 election ===
2008 general election: Hamilton East
Notes:	Blue background denotes the winner of the electorate vote. Pink background denotes a candidate elected from their party list. Yellow background denotes an electorate win by a list member, or other incumbent. A ✓ or ✗ denotes status of any incumbent, win or lose respectively.						
Party	Candidate	Votes	%	±%	Party votes	%	±%
National	✓ David Bennett	19,441	58.58	+7.46	16,745	49.50	+4.06
Labour	Sue Moroney	10,621	32.00	−4.79	10,420	30.80	−4.72
Green	Linda Persson	1,433	4.32	+0.71	2,439	7.21	+1.68
NZ First	Doug Woolerton	830	2.50	−1.32	1,113	3.29	−2.56
ACT	Garry Mallett	420	1.27	−0.18	1,387	4.10	+2.16
Kiwi	Robyn Jackson	180	0.54		189	0.56	
United Future	Rochelle White	168	0.51	−0.97	458	1.35	−2.06
Democrats	Carolyn McKenzie	54	0.16		17	0.05	+0.01
RONZ	Jack Gielen	41	0.12		16	0.05	+0.04
Māori Party					323	0.95	+0.33
Bill and Ben					243	0.72	
Progressive					190	0.56	−0.36
Legalise Cannabis					129	0.38	+0.23
Family Party					90	0.27	
Libertarianz					21	0.06	+0.01
Alliance					17	0.05	+0.01
Workers Party					15	0.04	
Pacific					13	0.04	
RAM					2	0.01	
Informal votes		236			112		
Total valid votes		33,188			33,827		
Turnout		34,176	80.48	−2.50			
National hold	Majority	8,820	26.58	+12.25			

=== 2005 election ===
2005 general election: Hamilton East
Notes:	Blue background denotes the winner of the electorate vote. Pink background denotes a candidate elected from their party list. Yellow background denotes an electorate win by a list member, or other incumbent. A ✓ or ✗ denotes status of any incumbent, win or lose respectively.						
Party	Candidate	Votes	%	±%	Party votes	%	±%
National	David Bennett	18,901	51.12	+12.47	17,122	45.44	+21.71
Labour	✗ Dianne Yates	13,603	36.79	−3.80	13,377	35.52	−0.11
NZ First	Doug Woolerton	1,411	3.82	−2.82	2,202	5.85	−4.35
Green	Daniel Howard	1,334	3.61	−1.45	2,083	5.53	−1.62
United Future	Adam Archer	547	1.48	−2.00	2,083	5.53	−2.75
ACT	Garry Mallett	534	1.44	−0.94	732	1.94	−7.83
Māori Party	Poutawa Biasiny-Tule	309	0.84		234	0.62	
Progressive	Peter Banks	243	0.66		347	0.92	
Independent	Jared Phillips	59	0.16				
Libertarianz	Robin Thomsen	34	0.09		21	0.06	
Destiny					109	0.29	
Legalise Cannabis					56	0.15	−0.34
Christian Heritage					37	0.10	−1.14
Alliance					17	0.05	−1.09
Democrats					15	0.04	
99 MP					12	0.03	
One NZ					8	0.02	−0.03
Direct Democracy					5	0.01	
Family Rights					3	0.01	
RONZ					2	0.01	
Informal votes		292			113		
Total valid votes		36,975			37,658		
Turnout		38,024	82.98	+4.61			
National gain from Labour	Majority	5,298	14.33	+16.27			

=== 2002 election ===
2002 general election: Hamilton East
Notes:	Blue background denotes the winner of the electorate vote. Pink background denotes a candidate elected from their party list. Yellow background denotes an electorate win by a list member, or other incumbent. A ✓ or ✗ denotes status of any incumbent, win or lose respectively.						
Party	Candidate	Votes	%	±%	Party votes	%	±%
Labour	Dianne Yates	12,827	40.59	-1.34	11,369	35.63	+0.20
National	✗ Tony Steel	12,213	38.65	−5.41	7,573	23.73	−11.70
NZ First	Doug Woolerton	2,099	6.64	+3.22	3,256	10.20	+6.26
Green	Cathy Olsen	1,665	5.27		2,281	7.15	+1.93
United Future	Richard Carter	1,101	3.48		2,643	8.28	+6.42^{a}
ACT	Brian George Dawson	751	2.38	+0.12	3,116	9.77	+0.64
Christian Heritage	Gavin Denby	307	0.97	−1.28	395	1.24	−1.15
Alliance	Ravaani D K Ghaemmaghamy	177	0.56	−3.54	365	1.14	−6.16
Progressive	Jim Medland	177	0.56		356	1.12	
ORNZ					255	0.80	
Legalise Cannabis					157	0.49	−0.44
Mana Māori					18	0.06	+0.02
One NZ					17	0.05	−0.03
NMP					2	0.01	
Informal votes		284			105		
Total valid votes		31,601			31,908		
Turnout		32,085	78.37	−7.23			
Labour gain from National	Majority	614	1.94	+4.07			

^{a} United Future swing compared to results of United NZ and Future NZ, as the two merged in 2000.

=== 1999 election ===
1999 general election: Hamilton East
Notes:	Blue background denotes the winner of the electorate vote. Pink background denotes a candidate elected from their party list. Yellow background denotes an electorate win by a list member, or other incumbent. A ✓ or ✗ denotes status of any incumbent, win or lose respectively.						
Party	Candidate	Votes	%	±%	Party votes	%	±%
National	✓ Tony Steel	14,329	44.06		11,620	35.43	
Labour	Dianne Yates	13,637	41.93		10,738	32.74	
Alliance	Peter Jamieson	1,334	4.10		2,394	7.30	
NZ First	Doug Woolerton	1,113	3.42		1,293	3.94	
ACT	Gavin Denby	734	2.26		2,993	9.13	
Christian Heritage	Madeleine Flannagan	732	2.25		783	2.39	
McGillicuddy Serious	Leanee V. Ireland	370	1.14		67	0.21	
Mauri Pacific	Helen Akhtari	179	0.55		35	0.11	
Natural Law	John Cleary	96	0.30		39	0.12	
Green					1,712	5.22	
Christian Democrats					446	1.36	
Legalise Cannabis					304	0.93	
United NZ					163	0.50	
Libertarianz					100	0.30	
Animals First					50	0.15	
One NZ					27	0.08	
Mana Māori					13	0.04	
NMP					6	0.02	
People's Choice					5	0.02	
Freedom Movement					4	0.01	
South Island					3	0.01	
Republican					2	0.01	
Informal votes		571			298		
Total valid votes		32,524			32,797		
Turnout		33,763	85.60				
National hold	Majority	692	2.13				

=== 1996 election ===
1996 general election: Hamilton East
Notes:	Blue background denotes the winner of the electorate vote. Pink background denotes a candidate elected from their party list. Yellow background denotes an electorate win by a list member, or other incumbent. A ✓ or ✗ denotes status of any incumbent, win or lose respectively.						
Party	Candidate	Votes	%	±%	Party votes	%	±%
National	Tony Steel	14,020	43.19	+6.15	13,029	39.92	
Labour	✗ Dianne Yates	11,673	35.96	−1.47	8,219	25.18	
NZ First	Doug Woolerton	2,920	8.99		3,604	11.04	
Alliance	Ashok Parbhu	1,684	5.19		2,757	8.45	
Christian Coalition	Lindsay Priest	798	2.46		1,734	5.31	
ACT	Graeme Williams	578	1.78		2,088	6.40	
McGillicuddy Serious	Justine Francis	354	1.09		123	0.38	
Progressive Green	Dianna Tawharu	176	0.54		88	0.27	
Independent	Pat Neagle	129	0.40				
Natural Law	John Cleary	67	0.21		63	0.19	
Superannuitants & Youth	Leslie Stroud	64	0.20		47	0.14	
Legalise Cannabis					430	1.32	
United NZ					279	0.85	
Animals First					63	0.19	
Ethnic Minority Party					31	0.09	
Mana Māori					29	0.09	
Libertarianz					19	0.06	
Green Society					16	0.05	
Conservatives					9	0.03	
Asia Pacific United					5	0.02	
Advance New Zealand					4	0.01	
Te Tawharau					0	0.00	
Informal votes		254			80		
Total valid votes		32,463			32,637		
National gain from Labour	Majority	2,347	7.23				

=== 1993 election ===
1993 general election: Hamilton East
Party	Candidate	Votes	%	±%
Labour	Dianne Yates	7,677	37.43	
National	Tony Steel	7,597	37.04	−12.09
Alliance	Paula Singh	2,556	12.46	
NZ First	Rex Widerstrom	1,860	9.07	
Christian Heritage	Tony Randell	494	2.40	
McGillicuddy Serious	Tania Leigh Smeaton	274	1.33	
Natural Law	Alison Clark	48	0.23	
Majority		80	0.39	
Turnout		20,506	85.07	−0.16
Registered electors		24,104		

=== 1990 election ===
1990 general election: Hamilton East
Party	Candidate	Votes	%	±%
National	Tony Steel	9,717	49.13	
Labour	Bill Dillon	7,596	38.41	−13.69
NewLabour	Shirley McKay	963	4.86	
McGillicuddy Serious	Graeme Cairns	449	2.27	
Independent	Pat Neagle	329	1.66	
Christian Heritage	Warwick Frank Jones	328	0.65	
Social Credit	Frank Strange	207	1.04	
Democrats	Douglas Lever	110	0.55	
Independent	Huw Evans	76	0.38	
Majority		2,121	10.72	
Turnout		19,775	85.23	−3.98
Registered electors		23,200		

=== 1987 election ===
1987 general election: Hamilton East
Party	Candidate	Votes	%	±%
Labour	Bill Dillon	10,397	52.10	+7.50
National	Sandra Shearer	8,726	43.73	
Democrats	Bill Cooker	478	2.39	−1.06
McGillicuddy Serious	S Evans	265	1.32	
NZ Party	Pamela Martin	88	0.44	
Majority		1,671	8.37	+2.69
Turnout		19,954	89.21	−3.50
Registered electors		22,367		

=== 1984 election ===
1984 general election: Hamilton East
Party	Candidate	Votes	%	±%
Labour	Bill Dillon	8,633	44.60	
National	Ian Shearer	7,533	38.92	−4.09
NZ Party	Margaret Evans	2,467	12.74	
Social Credit	Bill Cooker	669	3.45	
McGillicuddy Serious	Patricia Gunn	32	0.16	
Independent	Rex Stone	19	0.09	
Majority		1,100	5.68	
Turnout		19,353	92.71	+4.84
Registered electors		20,873		

=== 1981 election ===
1981 general election: Hamilton East
Party	Candidate	Votes	%	±%
National	Ian Shearer	8,525	43.01	+0.05
Labour	Lois Welch	7,337	37.01	+1.05
Social Credit	Lorna Booth	3,958	19.96	+1.14
Majority		1,188	5.99	−1.01
Turnout		19,820	87.87	−23.07
Registered electors		22,556		

=== 1978 election ===
1978 general election: Hamilton East
Party	Candidate	Votes	%	±%
National	Ian Shearer	8,352	42.96	−6.23
Labour	Lois Welch	6,991	35.96	
Social Credit	Lorna Booth	3,659	18.82	
Values	Rachel Elizabeth Stevenson	399	2.05	
Independent	Peter James Osborne	38	0.19	
Majority		1,361	7.00	−4.04
Turnout		19,439	64.80	−17.56
Registered electors		29,994		

=== 1975 election ===
1975 general election: Hamilton East
Party	Candidate	Votes	%	±%
National	Ian Shearer	10,001	49.19	
Labour	Rufus Rogers	7,765	38.19	−8.63
Social Credit	Charles Wilmot-Stilwell	1,754	8.62	+1.92
Values	Nick Mulligan	783	3.85	
Socialist Unity	Joan Mary Jones	17	0.08	
Majority		2,246	11.04	
Turnout		20,330	82.36	−6.90
Registered electors		24,684		

=== 1972 election ===
1972 general election: Hamilton East
Party	Candidate	Votes	%	±%
Labour	Rufus Rogers	7,872	46.82	
National	Ross Jansen	7,475	44.46	
Social Credit	Charles Wilmot-Stilwell	1,128	6.70	
Values	Peter Francis Cuttance	213	1.26	
Independent	Henry Brian Bishop	64	0.38	
New Democratic	Allan Stanley Lewin	42	0.24	
Liberal Reform	Allan Robert Wells	18	0.10	
Majority		397	2.36	
Turnout		16,812	89.26	
Registered electors		18,833		
