= Jamie Strange =

New Zealand politician (born 1976)

Jamie Strange MP
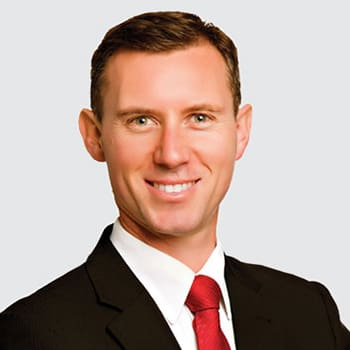

Member of the New Zealand Parliament for Hamilton East
- In office 17 October 2020 – 14 October 2023
- Preceded by: David Bennett
- Succeeded by: Ryan Hamilton

Member of the New Zealand Parliament for Labour Party List
- In office 23 September 2017 – 17 October 2020

Personal details
- Born: 1976 (age 49–50) Nelson, New Zealand
- Party: Labour
- Spouse: Angela
- Children: 4
- Profession: Teacher

Jamie Ross Strange (born 1976) is a former New Zealand politician. He was a Member of Parliament in the House of Representatives for the Labour Party from 2017 to 2023.

== Early life, career and family ==
Strange was born in Nelson in 1976. At 12 years of age, he moved with his family to Hamilton, where he attended Hamilton Boys' High School. Before entering parliament, Strange taught music at Berkley Normal Middle School in Hillcrest, Hamilton. He is also a former church minister.

Strange had a music career and has written over 40 songs and released his own album Thanks for Faking It Sometimes in 2007. The songs videos featured a mannequin who was present to mimic the "plastic-looking" girlfriends rock stars often have. Strange named the mannequin 'Kate Brightstar' after purchasing it from a store called Brightstar and later sold it on TradeMe to a truck driver. He returned to the stage during orientation week 2018, at the University of Waikato, shortly after being elected for the first time.

Jamie Strange is married to Angela Strange, a Hamilton constituency councillor on the Waikato Regional Council. The couple share four children.

== Political career ==
=== Member of Parliament ===
New Zealand Parliament
| Years | Term | Electorate | List | Party |
|---|---|---|---|---|
| 2017–2020 | 52nd | List | 36 | Labour |
| 2020–2023 | 53rd | Hamilton East | 40 | Labour |

Strange stood unsuccessfully for a seat on the Hamilton City Council in 2013. He sought the Labour nomination in Hamilton East at the 2014 election, but was unsuccessful. Instead, he stood in Taupō where he was defeated by the incumbent, National's Louise Upston. He was ranked 54 on the Labour party list, too low to be elected.

Strange was selected as the Labour candidate in the Hamilton East electorate for the 2017 election and was placed 36 on Labour's party list. Strange did not win the electorate, but entered parliament as a list MP. In his first term he served variously on the select committees for education and workforce; governance and administration; foreign affairs, defence and trade; transport and infrastructure; and finance and expenditure.

In July 2018 Strange said he expected a Hamilton to Auckland rail commuter service to be operating by the end of 2019. The opening of the train service, Te Huia, was delayed to 2021 due to the COVID-19 pandemic.

During the 2020 New Zealand general election, Strange successfully contested the Hamilton East electorate, defeating long-time National incumbent David Bennett by a final margin of 2,973 votes. In his second term he was appointed chair of the economic development, science and innovation committee and member of the governance and administration committee. He was also co-chair, with National MP Simeon Brown, of the parliamentary prayer breakfast group.

In mid-December 2022, Strange announced that he would not be contesting the 2023 New Zealand general election and would step down at the end of the 2020–2023 term. Strange attributed his resignation plans to the strain caused by his job travel requirements on family life. He also stated that he was "better suited for government than opposition" in response to polls forecasting a National-ACT-NZ First electoral victory at the 2023 election. His valedictory speech discussed his results in Parliamentary sports teams, expressed support for a four-year Parliamentary term instead of three, and said that New Zealanders "shouldn’t rule... out" becoming one country with Australia.

=== After parliament ===
Strange was elected as a Hamilton city councillor for the East ward in the 2025 local elections.

== Political views ==
Strange has a conservative voting record. He voted against the End of Life Choice Act 2019, Abortion Legislation Act 2020, and the Contraception, Sterilisation, and Abortion (Safe Areas) Amendment Act 2022.

New Zealand Parliament
| Preceded by David Bennett | Member of Parliament for Hamilton East; 2020–present | Incumbent |
