= James McDowall =

New Zealand ACT Party politician

Member of the New Zealand Parliament for ACT party list
- In office 17 October 2020 – 14 October 2023

Personal details
- Born: 6 January 1988 (age 38) Pukekohe, New Zealand
- Party: ACT
- Education: University of Waikato; Universiteit Maastricht

James Samuel McDowall (born 6 January 1988) is a former New Zealand politician. He was a Member of Parliament for ACT New Zealand from 2020 until 2023.

== Early life and career ==
McDowall was born in Pukekohe in 1988.

McDowall studied management at the University of Waikato and Maastricht University and graduated from Waikato in 2018 with a PhD in marketing. His doctoral thesis was titled The Future of Marketing – An Investigation into Disruption and Innovation and it presented possible scenarios for how technological innovations, such as big data and machine learning, could impact the marketing discipline by the year 2050.

He lives in Hamilton with his wife Sushan, a lawyer. Before McDowall's political career, they owned an immigration law firm together. McDowall has also worked for the Wise Group, one of the largest providers of mental health and wellbeing services in New Zealand.

McDowall is a vegetarian and has one daughter. He is a Cantonese speaker due to it being his wife's mother tongue.

== Political career ==
McDowall became politically involved with the ACT Party after the 2005 general election. He stood for ACT in the Hamilton East electorate in the 2017 general election, but received only 140 votes. He was also placed 13th on the ACT party list, but ACT did not win enough party votes to be entitled to any list MPs.

McDowall led the development of ACT's firearm policy in response to the Government's 2019 Arms Amendment Act.

=== Member of Parliament ===
New Zealand Parliament
| Years | Term | Electorate | List | Party |
|---|---|---|---|---|
| 2020–2023 | 53rd | List | 6 | ACT |

In the 2020 general election, McDowall was placed 6th on the ACT party list and ran for the electorate of Waikato. He focused on raising awareness of ACT rather than his own individual electorate. McDowall came third in Waikato, while ACT won 7.6% of the party vote, entitling it to ten MPs including McDowall. During the Commission Opening of the 53rd New Zealand Parliament, McDowall repeated his oath in Cantonese, attracting significant attention – "over a million views" – in Hong Kong. In 2022, he read the parliamentary prayer in Cantonese in recognition of New Zealand Chinese language week, and in 2023 he read the parliamentary prayer in Ukrainian.

In his maiden statement, McDowall identified himself as a firearms enthusiast and libertarian, stating his political ideology is "that our morals and ambitions are our own and that they should not be forced upon anyone else, not least of all by the Government of the day" and quoting Ayn Rand ("A Government is the most dangerous threat to man's rights"). He spoke about immigration, sharing his parents-in-law's immigration story and describing Immigration New Zealand as inefficient, low quality, and disrespectful. He also criticised New Zealand's "unacceptable levels" of poverty, homelessness, and over-representation of Māori in prisons.

McDowall was a member of Parliament's transport and infrastructure committee and the ACT Party's spokesperson for economic development; research, science and innovation; immigration, defence; and tourism. As ACT's immigration spokesperson, McDowall has often criticised the Labour government, such as its COVID-19 border policies and their impact on access to seasonal workers, its proposed new "priority" application system and its proposed law changes intended to prevent migrant worker exploitation, but which McDowall said would actually enable bad employers to exploit migrants more. The Green Party's immigration spokesperson, Ricardo Menéndez March, acknowledged the work of McDowall and others to "put immigration on the agenda." McDowall said in 2021 that "ACT would dump Labour’s ‘once in a generation’ immigration reset" and that it "would signal a return to the pre-COVID immigration settings as soon as public health concerns allow".

McDowall supported a law which allowed people to change the gender on their birth certificate. Speaking about the bill, which passed unanimously through parliament, he said it “advanc[ed] liberalism and actually reduc[ed] Government interference in people's lives by enabling choice”.

In November 2022, McDowall was selected as the ACT Party candidate for the 2022 Hamilton West by-election. He came third with ten percent of the vote.

He did not seek re-election at the 2023 general election.

== After politics ==
McDowall announced in January 2024 that he had been appointed Head of Advocacy for industry lobby group the Motor Trade Association, which he described as "an organisation that I have long admired and respected as the leading voice for the automotive industry in New Zealand."
