= David Bennett (New Zealand politician) =

New Zealand politician

The Honourable David Bennett

Minister of Veterans' Affairs
- In office 20 December 2016 – 26 October 2017
- Prime Minister: Bill English
- Preceded by: Craig Foss
- Succeeded by: Ron Mark

Minister for Food Safety
- In office 20 December 2016 – 26 October 2017
- Prime Minister: Bill English
- Preceded by: Jo Goodhew
- Succeeded by: Damien O'Connor

Member of the New Zealand Parliament for National party list
- In office 17 October 2020 – 14 October 2023

Member of the New Zealand Parliament for Hamilton East
- In office 17 September 2005 – 17 October 2020
- Preceded by: Dianne Yates
- Succeeded by: Jamie Strange

Personal details
- Born: David Allister Bennett; 28 October 1970 (age 56) Hamilton, New Zealand
- Party: National
- Website: davidbennett.co.nz

David Allister Bennett (born 28 October 1970) is a New Zealand former National Party politician. He was the Member of Parliament for Hamilton East from 2005 to 2020 and a list MP from 2020 to 2023. He was Minister for Food Safety and Minister of Veterans' Affairs in the final year of the Fifth National Government.

== Early years ==
Bennett was born on 28 October 1970 in Hamilton. He attended St John's College, Hamilton before gaining an LLB and a BCA from Victoria University of Wellington. Bennett owns two dairy farms near Te Awamutu, is partner in a third, and has also worked as an accountant for KPMG, in Auckland.

== Member of Parliament ==
New Zealand Parliament
Years	Term	Electorate	List	Party
2005–2008	48th	Hamilton East	32	National
2008–2011	49th	Hamilton East	44	National
2011–2014	50th	Hamilton East	48	National
2014–2017	51st	Hamilton East	37	National
2017–2020	52nd	Hamilton East	24	National
2020–2023	53rd	List	11	National

=== Fifth Labour Government, 2005–2008 ===
In the 2005 election, Bennett stood as the National Party's candidate for the Hamilton East seat. He was successful, defeating the incumbent MP, Dianne Yates of the Labour Party. In his maiden speech, he remarked that at age 34, he was the youngest National MP elected at that election. In his first term, he was a member of the Transport and Industrial Relations committee. He was an associate spokesperson for transport under National leader John Key from 1 December 2006.

=== Fifth National Government, 2008–2017 ===
Bennett retained Hamilton East for the duration of the Fifth National Government. He was a member of the Finance and Expenditure Committee from December 2008 to January 2017 (the last two years as chair), the Transport and Industrial Relations Committee from December 2008 to August 2014 (the last three years as chair), and the Foreign Affairs, Defence and Trade Committee from 2014 to 2017.

He was appointed Minister for Food Safety, Minister for Veterans' Affairs, and Associate Minister of Transport (outside Cabinet) after Bill English became Prime Minister in December 2016, and was additionally appointed Minister of Racing in 2017. On appointment, Bennett noted he was the first MP for a Hamilton electorate to become a minister since 1984 (when Ian Shearer completed a term as Minister for the Environment). He introduced the Government's Racing Amendment Bill in July 2017 but it was abandoned after National lost the 2017 election.

=== Sixth Labour Government, 2017–2023 ===
At the 2017 general election, Bennett retained Hamilton East by 5,810 votes over new Labour candidate Jamie Strange, but lost to Strange by a margin of 2,973 votes at the 2020 general election. Despite that loss, he was returned as a list MP.

The National Party was in opposition from October 2017. Bennett held various spokesperson roles for the party, including food safety and racing under the leadership of Bill English, corrections and land information under Simon Bridges, agriculture under Todd Muller and Judith Collins, and economic and regional development under Christopher Luxon.

Bennett briefly served as an Assistant Speaker of the House in August 2022. He retired at the 2023 New Zealand general election.

== After Parliament ==
In 2024, Judith Collins, the Minister of Science, Innovation and Technology, appointed Bennett to the board of Callaghan Innovation.

== Political views ==
In 2005, Bennett voted for the Marriage (Gender Clarification) Amendment Bill, which would have amended the Marriage Act to define marriage as only between a man and a woman. He opposed the Marriage (Definition of Marriage) Amendment Bill at its first and second readings in 2012 and 2013, but voted in support at its final reading in 2013. He supported the Conversion Practices Bill at second and third reading in 2022.

In 2009, Bennett voted against the Misuse of Drugs (Medicinal Cannabis) Amendment Bill, a bill aimed at amending the Misuse of Drugs Act so that cannabis could be used for medical purposes.

In 2019 and 2020, he voted for the Abortion Legislation Bill at all stages. In 2022, he supported the Contraception, Sterilisation, and Abortion (Safe Areas) Amendment Bill at its second and third reading.

== Personal life ==
Bennett was in a long-distance relationship with Australian senator Bridget McKenzie and both are members of their respective countries' National Parties with Senator McKenzie having served as her party's deputy leader between 2017 and 2020. On 26 July 2022 Bennett announced his intention to step down from Parliament at the 2023 election in order to spend more time with his fiancee Nicky Preston and their first child.

New Zealand Parliament
Preceded by Dianne Yates	Member of Parliament for Hamilton East; 2005–2020	Succeeded by Jamie Strange
