= NewZeal =

New Zealand political party

- Leader: Vacant
- General Secretary: Dollarina O'Sullivan
- Founded: September 2019
- Ideology: Social conservatism; Christian politics
- Colours
- Slogan: Working together for the good of the country
- MPs in the House of Representatives: 0 / 122

Website
- https://newzeal.org.nz/

NewZeal (formerly known as ONE Party) is an unregistered socially conservative political party in New Zealand, formerly led by Alfred Ngaro.

Former co-leader Stephanie Harawira incorporated One Party Limited as a New Zealand limited company in September 2019. The party was renamed to NewZeal in July 2023, and Alfred Ngaro assumed leadership at the same time.

It has contested the 2020 general election, a by-election in 2022, and the 2023 general election, all without success.

== Ideology ==
=== Current ideology ===
Under the leadership of Alfred Ngaro the party has stated that it is a party that stands for all New Zealanders.

=== Past ideology ===
In 2020, the party stated that God should be above politicians. It envisaged its MPs entering Parliament if elected but being answerable to an Apostolic Council of religious leaders from various faiths and cultural backgrounds. At the time the party generally leaned towards the pentecostal and evangelical wing of Christianity, though founder Stephanie Harawira said, "We didn't come together as Baptists, as Anglicans or Methodists. We came together just as people, who love the Lord." Prophecy has been important to the party; candidates spoke of being given a sign or message that it is their destiny to become politicians, and Harawira stated that God has spoken directly to her.

== History ==
=== 2020 election ===
The party launched at Marsden Cross in Rangihoua Bay (site of the first Christian service in New Zealand, in 1814) in June 2020. It said that it would run 20 candidates in both general and Māori electorates.

ONE Party became registered with the Electoral Commission in July 2020. It received a broadcasting allocation of $41,457 for the 2020 election.

The party reached an arrangement with Vision NZ, another Christian-based party. ONE Party did not stand a candidate in the Waiariki electorate, where Vision's leader Hannah Tamaki ran. In return, Vision NZ promised to not stand a candidate in Te Tai Tokerau. ONE Party was approached about joining an alliance of parties that included the New Zealand Public Party, led by Billy Te Kahika, who is also a Christian. However, Harawira said that their respective parties' kaupapa do not align. ONE Party encouraged supporters in electorates where it was not running a candidate to abstain from the electorate vote.

At the election, held on 17 October, ONE Party received 8,121 party votes (0.3%), far short of the 5% threshold to enter Parliament without winning at least one electorate seat.

=== 2021 leadership change ===
The party announced a leadership change on 18 October 2021, when founding leaders Stephanie Harawira and Edward Shanly stood down and were replaced with a tripartite leadership of Ian Johnson, Allan Cawood and Kariana Black.

=== 2022 by-election ===
For the 2022 Hamilton West by-election, ONE Party announced that it joined with the New Conservative Party to stand a single candidate: Rudi du Plooy, a New Conservative Party member. Du Plooy came seventh with 118 votes.

=== 2023 election ===
In July 2023 the party filed an application to change their name and logo to NewZeal. This became official in August 2023. Both RNZ and the New Zealand Herald described NewZeal as a "new political party" launched by Alfred Ngaro, who left the National Party to form it. Ngaro is a former National Party member and member of Parliament from 2011 to 2020. In 2019, rumours spread that Ngaro intended to leave National and form a new Christian party, which at the time he denied. In 2020, he lost his seat in Parliament after a poor result for National generally. Ngaro became disappointed with the National Party's opposition to gay conversion therapy and support for gender identity, and this led to his involvement with NewZeal. Ngaro is Christian but has insisted this didn't make NewZeal a Christian party. The party's current website makes no reference to any religious affiliation and does not contain any reference to its history as the ONE Party.

Across nine polls conducted for 1News between July 2022 and September 2023, the ONE Party or NewZeal registered between 0% and 0.5% support, far short of the threshold for entering Parliament without winning an electorate seat.

NewZeal received 0.56% of the party vote and did not win any electorate seats, leaving it outside Parliament.

=== 2026 alignment with New Zealand First ===
On 22 March 2026, Ngaro spoke during New Zealand First leader Winston Peters' State of the Nation address in Tauranga where he announced that he would be standing as a candidate for that party during the 2026 New Zealand general election. That same day, Ngaro confirmed that he and the NewZeal party would align with NZ First, citing "strategic realism and shared values." The party was subsequently deregistered at its own request by 31 March 2026.

== List of leaders ==
Leader of the ONE Party
No.	Name	Portrait	Term of office		No.	Name	Portrait	Term of office		No.	Name	Portrait	Term of office	
1	Stephanie Harawira		September 2019	December 2021	1	Edward Shanly		September 2019	December 2021					
2	Ian Johnson		December 2021	c. August 2023	2	Allan Cawood		December 2021	c. August 2023	2	Kariana Black		December 2021	c. August 2023
Leader of NewZeal
No.	Name						Portrait	Term of office						
3	Alfred Ngaro							August 2023					22 March 2026	

== Election results ==
=== House of Representatives ===
Election	Candidates nominated		Seats won	Votes	Vote share %	Position	MPs in parliament
Election	Electorate	List	Seats won	Votes	Vote share %	Position	MPs in parliament
2020	28	39	0	8,121	0.28	11	0 / 120
2023	4	11	0	16,109	0.56	9	0 / 122

== See also ==
- Christian politics in New Zealand
