= 2013 Hamilton City Council election =

2013 elections in Hamilton, New Zealand

- 12 October 2013
- Results of the Council election
- Mayoral election
Mayor before election
Julie Hardaker
Elected mayor
Julie Hardaker

In the city of Hamilton, New Zealand, elections were held for the offices of Mayor of Hamilton and twelve members of the Hamilton City Council (HCC) on 12 October 2013. They were held as part of the 2013 New Zealand local elections. Referendums on city water fluoridation and to determine voting method for electing city councillors in the future were held simultaneously. Postal ballots were issued to 97,259 registered voters, and were returned from 23 September to 12 October 2013. Across the city, 37,276 people cast votes, a voter turnout of 38.33%. Some voters chose not to vote in particular elections or referendums, so voter turnout in individual elections varies from this figure.

Julie Hardaker was re-elected for her second term as mayor with 43.6% of the vote. First past the post (FPP) was used to elect the twelve members of the HCC—six from each of the East and West Wards. FPP was retained over single transferable vote (STV) as the method used to elect city councillors in future elections. A majority voted for the return of city water fluoridation.

== Mayor ==
Incumbent mayor Julie Hardaker was re-elected with a 2,911-vote majority over Ewan Wilson.

Hamilton mayoral election, 2013
Party	Candidate	Votes	%	±%
None	Julie Hardaker	15,737	43.61	+2.79
Independent	Ewan Wilson	12,826	35.55	—
Independent	Dave Macpherson	2,963	8.21	—
None	Tony Dixon	1,564	4.33	—
Affordable Waikato	Tim Wikiriwhi	954	2.64	—
Independent	Ian Hanley	876	2.43	—
None	Arshad Chatha	743	2.06	—
Sovereignty	Jack Gielen	419	1.16	−0.13
Majority		2,911	8.07	+5.21
Total valid votes		36,082	99.65	
Informal votes		128	0.35	
Turnout		36,210	37.23	
Registered electors		97,259		

== City council ==
=== East Ward ===
The six candidates with the most votes were elected, shown in the table below by a green tick.

Hamilton City Council election, 2013 – East Ward
Party	Candidate	Votes	%	±%
Independent	Margaret Forsyth	8,533	8.75	+1.68
New Council	Garry Mallett	6,725	6.90	+0.26
None	Philip Yeung	6,066	6.22	—
Independent	Rob Pascoe	6,030	6.19	—
Independent	Gordon Chesterman	5,915	6.07	−4.17
New Council	Karina Green	5,809	5.96	—
Independent	Roger Hennebry	5,150	5.28	−2.72
Independent	Anjum Rahman	4,676	4.80	—
Independent	Jamie Strange	4,596	4.71	—
Independent	James Casson	4,395	4.51	—
New Council	Basil Wood	4,004	4.11	—
None	Tony Dixon	3,832	3.93	—
Independent	Warren "Possum" Allen	3,581	3.67	−0.76'"`UNIQ−−ref−0000002B−QINU`"'
Independent	Matiu Dickson	3,564	3.66	−0.22
Independent	Peter Humphreys	3,155	3.24	—
Independent	Jason Howarth	3,134	3.21	—
Independent	Rex Bushell	3,015	3.09	—
Independent	Ian Hanley	2,297	2.36	—
None	Charlie Gower	2,096	2.15	—
Independent	Vaughan Mikkelson	2,039	2.09	—
None	Javed Chaudhry	1,953	2.00	—
Independent	Adrienne Hagan	1,848	1.90	—
Independent	Ross MacLeod	1,723	3.09	−1.17
Independent	David Natzke	1,691	1.73	—
Independent	Jim Parlane	853	0.88	—
Sovereignty	Jack Gielen	802	0.82	—
Total valid votes		97,482		
Informal votes		189	0.97	
Turnout		19,434	38.97	
Registered electors		49,866		

=== West Ward ===
Hamilton City Council election, 2013 – West Ward
Party	Candidate	Votes	%	±%
Independent	Martin Gallagher	9,792	11.26	−0.44
Independent	Ewan Wilson	7,981	9.18	+0.52
Independent	Leo Tooman	7,152	8.23	—
Independent	Angela O'Leary	6,761	7.78	+0.70
Two Generations	Andrew King	5,321	6.12	+2.28
Independent	Dave "Mac" Macpherson	4,879	5.61	−0.40
Independent	Holly Snape	4,595	2.92	—
Two Generations	Josh King	4,482	5.16	—
New Council	Michael West	3,938	4.53	—
New Council	Steve McLennan	3,729	4.29	—
Independent	Russelle Knaap	3,672	4.22	—
Independent	Tureiti Moxon	3,081	3.54	—
Independent	Peter Findlay	2,946	3.45	—
Independent	Robin Fletcher	2,742	3.21	−0.07
None	Stephen King	2,676	3.08	—
None	Nick Ravlich	2,542	2.92	—
Independent	Peter Bos	2,304	2.65	−5.55'"`UNIQ−−ref−00000032−QINU`"'
None	Jamie Toko	1,965	2.26	—
None	Paul Ravlich	1,904	2.19	—
Affordable Waikato	Tim Wikiriwhi	1,623	1.87	−0.02
Independent	Robert Curtis	1,119	1.29	+0.01
Independent	Andrew Warren	1,082	1.24	—
None	Roger Stratford	658	0.76	—
Total votes		86,944		
Informal votes		166	0.97	
Turnout		17,032	35.94	
Registered electors		47,393		

== Referendums ==
=== Water fluoridation ===
==== Background ====
Fluoride has been added to drinking water in Hamilton since 1966 to improve dental health. Hamilton sources its water from the Waikato River, which has a fluoride concentration of 0.1–0.3 parts per million (ppm); in 2012 fluoride concentration in Hamilton drinking water was 0.7 parts per million. Parts of southern and western Waikato District are also served by the Hamilton city water supply.

In 2006, a binding referendum was held in which 69.46% of voters supported continuation of public water fluoridation, while 30.54% opposed it. The referendum had a voter turnout of 38%. During the draft of the city council's 2011/12 annual plan in February 2011, the termination of water fluoridation was discussed by councillors, but no decision was made. 120 submissions related to water fluoridation were filed for the annual plan in March and April 2011. A referendum was planned to coincide with the 2013 local elections, but this was cancelled by the council on 8 June 2012 after taking legal advice that the referendum may not be deemed adequate public consultation. From 28 to 31 May 2013, public hearings were held and attended by councillors, and on 5 June 2013, the city council voted 7–1 (with five abstentions) to cease water fluoridation. The council wrote to Minister of Health Tony Ryall requesting that, as a health issue, water fluoridation be decided by the national government. The cost of water fluoridation was estimated by the city council as $48,000 per year.

==== Results ====
Hamilton water fluoridation referendum, 2013
Choice	Votes	%
I vote for fluoride being added to the water	24,635	67.67
I vote against fluoride being added to the water	11,768	32.33
Total	36,403	100.00
Valid votes	36,403	99.98
Invalid/blank votes	9	0.02
Total votes	36,412	100.00
Registered voters/turnout	97,259	37.44

==== Aftermath ====
On election day, the referendum result was welcomed by both the chief executive and Medical Officer of Health of the Waikato District Health Board. As the referendum was not binding, a council vote was required to restart fluoridation. On 28 November 2013 the HCC delayed its decision pending a legal challenge to the decision by the South Taranaki District to fluoridate water there. The HCC voted 9–1 in favour (3 abstentions) of refluoridating water on 27 March 2014. The lobby group Safe Water Alternative New Zealand (SWANZ) sought an interim order from the High Court to prevent fluoridation until their application for judicial review could be heard. The application for an interim order was dismissed on 27 June 2014. SWANZ removed its application for judicial review on 4 September 2014, ahead of the 9 September hearing.

=== Voting method ===
Hamilton voting method referendum, 2013
Choice	Votes	%
First past the post	24,623	69.74
Single transferable vote	10,682	30.26
Total	35,305	100.00
Valid votes	35,305	99.99
Invalid/blank votes	3	0.01
Total votes	35,308	100.00
Registered voters/turnout	97,259	36.30
