= Andrew King (New Zealand politician) =

New Zealand politician (born 1960/61)

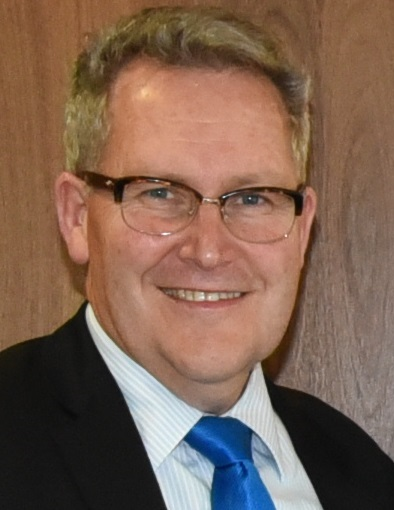
- King in 2017

35th Mayor of Hamilton
- In office 9 November 2016 – 24 October 2019
- Deputy: Martin Gallagher
- Preceded by: Julie Hardaker
- Succeeded by: Paula Southgate

Personal details
- Born: 1960 or 1961 (age 65–66)
- Party: National

Andrew King is a New Zealand politician who served as the Mayor of Hamilton, New Zealand from October 2016 to October 2019.

== Early life ==
King attended Hamilton Boys' High School and completed an apprenticeship in combustion engine reconditioning before training as an electrician and working self-employed. King worked for three years in London in building maintenance. After returning to New Zealand, he began property investment in Hamilton and Auckland and opened the businesses Kings Cars and Kings Finance.

== Political career ==
=== Hamilton City Council ===
King ran for the Hamilton City Council in the West ward with his son Josh on the "Two Generations" ticket in the 2013 elections. King received the fifth-most votes and was elected. However, Josh received the eighth-most and was not elected.

King announced his mayoral campaign on 1 August 2016. He was elected mayor in the 2016 election held on 8 October, and began his term on 9 November. He appointed former Labour MP Martin Gallagher as Deputy Mayor, Gallagher had previously served as Deputy Mayor between March 1988 and November 1993.

His Mayoralty saw significant rates rises for Hamilton residents, with rates rising an average of 9.7% in 2018. He also led the council in purchasing multiple properties on the Waikato River in order to develop a central city river park. The decision was controversial, with King casting the tie-breaking vote when the council voted on the plan, although he defended the plan as crucial to connecting the Hamilton City Center to the Waikato River. He also pushed for the adoption of Māori wards for Hamilton and the addition of Kirikiriroa, Hamilton's Māori name as a second official name of the city.

King ran for a second term in the 2019 Hamilton mayoral election, he was challenged by City Councillor Paula Southgate, who he had defeated by just six votes in 2016. King was soundly defeated by Southgate at the election, securing just under 2500 more votes than King. He defended the rates rises that occurred during his mayoralty, citing them as necessary to fixing the city's finances, saying "I'm very proud of what we've done and what we've achieved, and there was a price to pay for that – and that was my job." King finished his term on 24 October 2019.

=== Post Mayoralty ===
A Liverpool Street mansion sold by King in 2021 set the record for Hamilton's most expensive house sale, at $5.5 million. He had bought the house in 2017 for $2.05M and lived in it with his family while working as mayor. The purchasers were a group of developers.

In April 2022, King announced his intent to seek the National Party nomination to contest Hamilton West at the next general election in 2023, having joined the party shortly after losing the Hamilton mayoralty. Six months later, incumbent MP Gaurav Sharma resigned from Parliament, triggering a by-election in the seat. Shortly before the party released its shortlist of candidates, King confirmed that he was out of the running. He wouldn't confirm whether he stood aside voluntarily or at the direction of the party, which was operating under expectations from leader Christopher Luxon to improve the diversity of its candidates.

== Personal life ==
King is Christian. He is married to Anne, and the couple have three children.

Political offices
Preceded by Julie Hardaker	Mayor of Hamilton; 2016–2019	Succeeded by Paula Southgate
