= 2025 Hamilton City Council election =

Elections in New Zealand

- 11 October 2025
- Turnout: 38,063 (32.97% ▲3.81 pp)
- Mayor
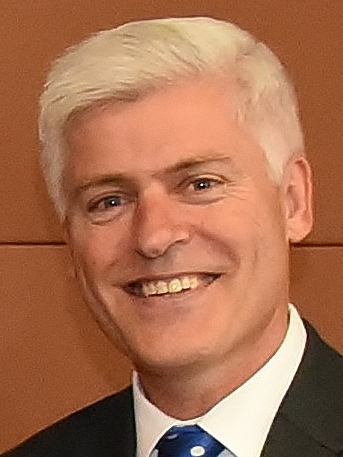

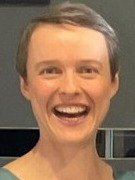
Candidate	Tim Macindoe	Sarah Thomson
Party	Independent	Independent
Primary vote	16,895	9,240
Percentage	44.39%	24.28%
Final vote	18,275	10,183
Percentage	50.30%	28.03%
	Ind	Ind
Candidate	Maria Huata	Rachel Karalus
Party	Independent	Independent
Primary vote	3,718	3,049
Percentage	9.77%	8.01%
Final vote	4,329	3,546
Percentage	11.91%	9.76%
Mayor before election
Paula Southgate
Independent
Elected mayor
Tim Macindoe
Independent
- Councillors
- 14 seats on the governing body of Hamilton City Council; 8 seats needed for a majority
Party	Seats	+/–
Independent	10	−2
Better Hamilton	4	+4
This lists parties that won seats. See the complete results below.

The 2025 Hamilton City Council election was a local election held from 9 September to 11 October in Hamilton, New Zealand, as part of that year's territorial authority elections and other local elections held nation-wide.

Voters elected the mayor of Hamilton and 14 city councillors for the 2025–2028 term of the Hamilton City Council. Postal voting and the single transferable vote system were used.

A finalised list of candidate names was released by the City Council on 4 August identifying 52 candidates, including 12 candidates for mayor. Incumbent mayor Paula Southgate did not run for re-election.

Councillor Tim Macindoe won the mayoralty, with fellow councillor Sarah Thomson coming in second place.

The council introduced a Māori ward at the 2022 election; in a referendum on its future held at this election (as part of a nation-wide series of referendums) voters elected to keep the Māori ward.

== Key dates ==
- 4 July 2025: Nominations for candidates opened
- 1 August 2025: Nominations for candidates closed at 12 pm
- 9 September 2025: Voting documents were posted and voting opened
- 11 October 2025: Voting closed at 12 pm and progress/preliminary results were published
- 16–19 October 2025: Final results were declared.

== Background ==
=== Positions up for election ===
Voters in the city elected the mayor of Hamilton and 14 councillors from 3 wards. They also elected several members of the Waikato Regional Council. (Note: 4 members from the city in the Hamilton general constituency.; 1 member partially from the city representing the Ngā Hau e Whā Māori constituency.)

== Campaign ==
Better Hamilton was a group of candidates who jointly campaigned during the election campaign.

== List of candidates ==
=== Incumbents not seeking re-election ===
- Paula Southgate, mayor since 2019
- Moko Tauariki, councillor for the Kirikiriroa Maaori ward since 2022
- Ewan Wilson, councillor in the West ward since 2019
- Kesh Naidoo-Rauf, councillor in the East ward since 2019

=== Mayor ===
Incumbent mayor Paula Southgate did not run for re-election. Incumbent councillor and former National MP Tim Macindoe contested the election, as well as incumbent councillors Sarah Thomson and Maria Huata. Rachel Karalus also ran.

=== Councillors ===
==== Kirikiriroa Maaori ward ====
The Kirikiriroa Maaori ward returned two councillors to the city council.

Candidate	Affiliation (Note: A candidate may leave their affiliation blank, run as an independent, or run with an affiliation to an organisation, local body ticket or political party.)	Notes
Jarrad Gallagher	None	
Maria Huata	None	Incumbent councillor since 2024 by-election. Also ran for mayor.
Lawrence Jensen	Independent	
Robbie Neha	Independent	
Andrew Lewis Pope	None	
Jahvaya Watene Wheki	Independent	

==== West ward ====
The West ward returned six councillors to the city council.

Candidate	Affiliation	Notes
Paul Alforque	None	Lawyer and consultant.
Matthew Beveridge	Independent	
Mark Flyger	Better Hamilton	
Nidhita Gosai	ACT Local	Process safety engineer
Louise Hutt	None	Incumbent councillor
Mesh Macdonald	Better Hamilton	
Allan James McKie	None	
Graeme Mead	Better Hamilton	
Angela O'Leary	Independent	Incumbent councillor and deputy mayor
Emma Pike	Independent	Incumbent councillor
Dave Taylor	None	Also ran for mayor
Geoff Taylor	None	Incumbent councillor
Sarah Thomson	Independent	Incumbent councillor, also standing as a mayoral candidate
Mike West	Better Hamilton	
Roderick John Young	None	

==== East ward ====
The East ward returned six councillors to the city council.

Candidate	Affiliation	Notes
Rachel Afeaki	Independent	
Stuart David Aitken	Better Hamilton	
Andrew Bydder	Better Hamilton	Incumbent councillor and architectural designer
Anna Casey-Cox	None	Incumbent councillor
Preet Dhaliwal	ACT Local	Hospitality business owner
Rudi du Plooy	None	Previously stood as a joint New Conservatives & NewZeal (formerly known as ONE Party) candidate in the 2022 Election for the Hamilton West electorate. Also ran for mayor.
Jack Gielen	The Peoples Voice	Former deputy leader for The Republic of New Zealand Party. Also ran for mayor.
Marie Hamilton	Independent	Ryan Hamilton, MP for Hamilton East representing the National Party is Marie's husband.
Louise Rachel Harvey	New Zealand Constitution Party	
Suhair Sabah Hassan	New Zealand Constitution Party	
Horiana Henderson	Better Hamilton	
Peter Humphreys	None	
Tim Hunt	None	
Jason Jonassen	Independent	
Rachel Karalus	Independent	Also ran for mayor.
Leo Liu	Better Hamilton	
Tim Macindoe	Independent	Incumbent councillor, also standing as a mayoral candidate.
Danielle Marks	None	Green Party endorsed.
Alexander Bruce McConnochie	None	
John McDonald	Better Hamilton	Also ran for mayor
Sue Moroney	None	Previously a Labour Party list MP, 2005-2017
Jenny Nand	Independent	
Jono Ng	Independent	
Turi Robinson	Independent	
Jamie Strange	Independent	Previously a Labour List MP and then MP for Hamilton East, 2017-2023.
Jackie Talbot	Independent	
Maxine van Oosten	None	Incumbent councillor

== Results ==
=== Mayor ===
Councillor Tim Macindoe won the mayoral election, with Sarah Thomson coming second.

2025 Hamilton mayoral election
Party	Candidate	Primary votes	%	±%	Iteration	
Party	Candidate	Primary votes	%	±%	#	Votes
Independent	Tim Macindoe	16,895	44.39	(new)	9th	18,275
Independent	Sarah Thomson	9,240	24.28	(new)	9th	10,183
Independent	Maria Huata	3,718	9.77	(new)	9th	4,329
Independent	Rachel Karalus	3,049	8.01	(new)	9th	3,546
Independent	Rudi Du Plooy	1,427	3.75	(new)	8th	1,692
Independent	Dave Taylor	818	2.15	(new)	7th	1,047
Better Hamilton	John McDonald	657	1.73	(new)	6th	759
Animal Justice	Lily Carrington	632	1.66	(new)	5th	681
Constitution	Roman Tupaea-Warren	310	0.81	(new)	4th	347
Independent	Jack Gielen	271	0.71	−0.89	3rd	292
Independent	Roger Stratford	214	0.56	(new)	2nd	220
Independent	Guy Wayne Temoni-Syme	212	0.56	(new)	1st	212
Quota		18,722	49.19	n/a		
Informal votes		210	0.55	−0.12		
Blank votes		410	1.08	−0.20		
Turnout		38,063	32.97	+3.81		
Registered electors		115,433				
Independent gain from Independent on 9th iteration						

=== Council ===
==== West general ward ====
2025 West general ward election
Party	Candidate	Primary votes	%	±%	Iteration	
Party	Candidate	Primary votes	%	±%	#	Votes
Independent	Geoff Taylor^{†}	2,628	17.85	−16.41	1st	2,628
Independent	Sarah Thomson^{†}	2,882	19.58	+6.13	1st	2,882
Better Hamilton	Graeme Mead	1,566	10.64	(new)	10th	2,035
Better Hamilton	Mesh MacDonald	1,106	7.51	(new)	16th	2,324
Independent	Angela O'Leary^{†}	1,024	6.96	−8.94	18th	1,936
Independent	Emma Pike^{†}	710	4.82	−9.22	21st	1,868
Independent	Louise Hutt^{†}	989	6.72	−5.94	21st	1,733
Better Hamilton	Mark Alexander Flyger	712	4.84	(new)	15th	1,335
Better Hamilton	Michael West	541	3.68	−6.55	11th	908
Independent	Dave Taylor	524	3.56	(new)	9th	785
ACT Local	Nidhita Gosai	543	3.69	(new)	7th	630
Independent	Allan James McKie	416	2.83	(new)	6th	516
Independent	Matthew James Peter Beveridge	408	2.77	(new)	5th	484
Independent	Paul Alforque	188	1.28	(new)	3rd	212
Independent	Roderick John Young	58	0.39	(new)	2nd	65
Quota		2,042	13.87	n/a		
Informal votes		175	1.19	−1.83		
Blank votes		249	1.69	+0.45		
Turnout		14,719	32.47	+2.40		
Registered electors		45,336				
Independent hold on 1st iteration						
Independent hold on 1st iteration						
Better Hamilton gain from Independent on 10th iteration						
Better Hamilton gain from Independent Green on 16th iteration						
Independent hold on 18th iteration						
Independent hold on 21st iteration						
^{†} incumbent

==== East general ward ====
2025 East general ward election
Party	Candidate	Primary votes	%	±%	Iteration	
Party	Candidate	Primary votes	%	±%	#	Votes
Independent	Rachel Karalus	2,288	11.96	(new)	15th	2,607
Better Hamilton	Andrew Bydder^{†}	1,916	10.02	−2.66	17th	2,561
Independent	Anna Casey-Cox^{†}	1,593	8.33	−8.16	21st	2,744
Independent	Jamie Strange	1,511	7.90	(new)	23rd	2,535
Better Hamilton	Leo Liu	1,320	6.90	(new)	24th	2,588
Independent	Sue Moroney	1,326	6.93	(new)	25th	2,431
Independent	Marie Hamilton	1,135	5.93	(new)	25th	2,104
Independent	Rudi Du Plooy	872	4.56	(new)	22nd	1,317
Independent	Maxine Joy Van Oosten^{†}	848	4.43	−9.03	20th	1,142
Independent	Rachel Afeaki	773	4.04	(new)	18th	1,053
ACT Local	Preet Raj Singh Dhaliwal	645	3.37	(new)	16th	796
Independent Green	Danielle Marks	555	2.90	(new)	15th	718
Better Hamilton	John McDonald	525	2.74	(new)	14th	647
Independent	Jackie Talbot	491	2.57	(new)	13th	558
Independent	Jenny Nand	457	2.39	−4.10	12th	520
Better Hamilton	Stuart David Aitken	438	2.29	(new)	11th	484
Independent	Peter Humphreys	376	1.97	(new)	10th	440
Better Hamilton	Horiana Adrienne Henderson	273	1.43	−3.52	9th	298
Independent	Jason Jonassen	229	1.20	−2.22	8th	248
Independent	Jono Ng	185	0.97	(new)	7th	191
Independent	Tim Hunt	142	0.74	(new)	6th	147
Independent	Jack Gielen	140	0.73	−1.50	5th	146
Independent	Alexander Bruce McConnochie	84	0.44	(new)	4th	84
Constitution	Suhair Sabah Hassan	73	0.38	(new)	3rd	82
Constitution	Louise Rachel Harvey	46	0.24	(new)	2nd	47
Independent	Turi Robinson	29	0.15	(new)	1st	29
Independent	Tim Macindoe^{†}	0	0.00	(new)	1st	0
Quota		2,610	13.64	n/a		
Informal votes		386	2.02	−2.42		
Blank votes		183	0.96	−0.75		
Turnout		19,131	34.94	+2.47		
Registered electors		54,748				
Independent gain from Independent on 15th iteration						
Better Hamilton gain from Team Integrity on 17th iteration						
Independent hold on 21st iteration						
Independent gain from Independent on 23rd iteration						
Better Hamilton gain from Independent on 24th iteration						
Independent gain from Independent on 25th iteration						
^{†} incumbent

==== Kirikiriroa Maaori ward ====
2025 Kirkiriroa Maaori ward election
Party	Candidate	Primary votes	%	±%	Iteration	
Party	Candidate	Primary votes	%	±%	#	Votes
Independent	Maria Huata^{†}	2,620	62.19	(new)	1st	2,620
Independent	Robbie Neha	511	12.13	(new)	5th	1,163
Independent	Jahvaya Watene Wheki	383	9.09	(new)	5th	1,013
Independent	Jarrad Gallagher	350	8.31	(new)	4th	550
Independent	Lawrence Jensen	189	4.49	(new)	3rd	317
Independent	Andrew Lewis Pope	20	0.47	(new)	2nd	31
Quota		1,358	32.23	n/a		
Informal votes		71	1.69	+0.10		
Blank votes		69	1.64	−2.10		
Turnout		4,213	27.45	+12.72		
Registered electors		15,349				
Independent hold on 1st iteration						
Independent gain from Independent on 5th iteration						
^{†} incumbent

=== Maaori Ward Poll ===
Choice	Votes	%
I vote to KEEP Maaori wards	19,190	54.04
I vote to REMOVE Maaori wards	16,320	45.96
Total	35,510	100.00
Valid votes	35,510	93.29
Invalid/blank votes	2,553	6.71
Total votes	38,063	100.00

== See also ==
- 2025 Hauraki District Council election
