= 2025 Hamilton mayoral election =

New Zealand election

- 11 October 2025
- Turnout: 38,063
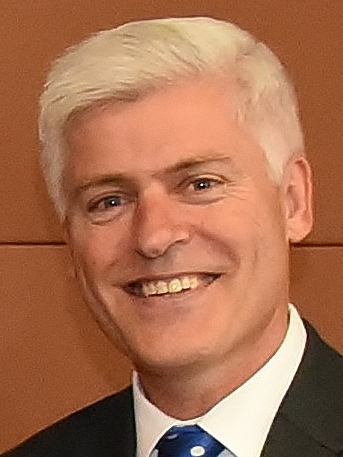

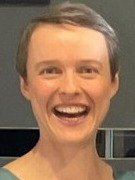
Candidate	Tim Macindoe	Sarah Thomson
Affiliation	Independent	Independent
Primary vote	16,895	9,240
Percentage	44.39%	24.28%
Final vote	18,275	10,183
Percentage	50.30%	28.03%
Candidate	Maria Huata	Rachel Karalus
Affiliation	Independent	Independent
Primary vote	3,718	3,049
Percentage	9.77%	8.01%
Final vote	4,329	3,546
Percentage	11.91%	9.76%
Mayor before election
Paula Southgate
Independent
Elected mayor
Tim Macindoe
Independent

The 2025 Hamilton mayoral election was a local election held from 9 September to 11 October in Hamilton, New Zealand, as part of that year's city council election and nation-wide local elections. Voters elected the mayor of Hamilton for the 2025–2028 term of the Hamilton City Council. Postal voting and the single transferable vote system were used.

The incumbent mayor Paula Southgate did not run for a second term.

Candidate names were provisionally released by the City Council on 1 August identifying 12 candidates.

Tim Macindoe was elected mayor, receiving 18,275 votes to Sarah Thomson’s 10,183.

== Key dates ==
- 4 July 2025: Nominations for candidates opened
- 1 August 2025: Nominations for candidates closed at 12 pm
- 9 September 2025: Voting documents were posted and voting opened
- 11 October 2025: Voting closed at 12 pm and progress/preliminary results will be published
- 16–19 October 2025: Final results will be declared.

== Campaign ==
During the Hamilton mayoral election, Macindoe ran on a conservative platform of "cost reductions" including lower rates and "slimming down" the Hamilton City Council. His main competitor Sarah Thomson ran on a progressive platform of opposing cuts to Council services, improving housing and bus services, and keeping rates "affordable."

== List of candidates ==
=== Declared ===
Candidate	Photo	Affiliation (Note: A candidate could leave their affiliation blank, run as an independent, or run with an affiliation to an organisation, local body ticket or political party.)	Notes
Lily Carrington		Animal Justice Party	Previously ran for the mayoralty in 2022
Rudi Du Plooy		None	Previously stood as a joint New Conservatives & NewZeal (formerly known as ONE Party) candidate in the 2022 Election for the Hamilton West electorate. Also ran to be a councillor for the East general ward.
Jack Gielen		The Peoples Voice	Perennial candidate, having stood in every election for the Hamilton mayoralty since 2010. Also ran to be a councillor for the East general ward.
Maria Huata		None	Incumbent councillor for the Kirikiriroa Maaori ward. Also ran for re-election as a councillor.
Rachel Karalus		Independent	Former head of the K'aute Pasifika charitable trust. Also ran to be a councillor for the East general ward.
Tim Macindoe		Independent	Incumbent councillor for the East ward, and former MP for Hamilton West. Also ran for re-election as a councillor.
John McDonald		None	Also ran to be a councillor for the East general ward.
Roger Stratford		None	Previously stood in the 2024 Hamilton East ward by-election
Dave Taylor		None	Also ran to be a councillor for the West general ward.
Guy Wayne Temoni-Syme		None	
Sarah Thomson		Independent	Incumbent councillor for the West ward. Also ran for re-election as a councillor.
Roma Tupaea-Warren		New Zealand Constitution Party	Founder of the New Zealand Constitution Party

== Results ==
Tim Macindoe won the mayoral election, with Sarah Thomson coming second.

2025 Hamilton mayoral election
Party	Candidate	Primary votes	%	±%	Iteration	
Party	Candidate	Primary votes	%	±%	#	Votes
Independent	Tim Macindoe	16,895	44.39	(new)	9th	18,275
Independent	Sarah Thomson	9,240	24.28	(new)	9th	10,183
Independent	Maria Huata	3,718	9.77	(new)	9th	4,329
Independent	Rachel Karalus	3,049	8.01	(new)	9th	3,546
Independent	Rudi Du Plooy	1,427	3.75	(new)	8th	1,692
Independent	Dave Taylor	818	2.15	(new)	7th	1,047
Better Hamilton	John McDonald	657	1.73	(new)	6th	759
Animal Justice	Lily Carrington	632	1.66	(new)	5th	681
Constitution	Roman Tupaea-Warren	310	0.81	(new)	4th	347
Independent	Jack Gielen	271	0.71	−0.89	3rd	292
Independent	Roger Stratford	214	0.56	(new)	2nd	220
Independent	Guy Wayne Temoni-Syme	212	0.56	(new)	1st	212
Quota		18,722	49.19	n/a		
Informal votes		210	0.55	−0.12		
Blank votes		410	1.08	−0.20		
Turnout		38,063	32.97	+3.81		
Registered electors		115,433				
Independent gain from Independent on 9th iteration						
