= Simcock =

Simcock may refer to:

- Bob Simcock (born 1947), the Mayor of Hamilton, New Zealand
- Gwilym Simcock (born 1981), British pianist and composer
- Simcock House (Swansea, Massachusetts), historic house at 1074 Sharps Lot Road in Swansea, Massachusetts
