= Coat of arms of Hamilton, New Zealand =

Coat of arms of Hamilton
- Armiger: Hamilton City Council
- Adopted: 1946
- Crest: A mural crown.
- Shield: Barry-wavy of eight argent and azure; on a bend verte, 3 oxen heads erased, or.
- Supporters: A pūkeko, on either side, rampant proper.
- Designer: Zelda A. Paul

The coat of arms of Hamilton, is the heraldic achievement representing the city of Hamilton, New Zealand. The arms were adopted in 1946, following a competition launched by the city council.

== History ==
The arms were adopted in 1946, following a competition held by the city council for coat of arms. Tokoroa artist Zelda A. Paul won the contest, earning ten pounds as prize money. The arms have faced controversy, being accused of not reflecting the history and diversity of the city, with suggestions that it should be changed, yet mayor Paula Southgate announced she refused to modify the emblem.

== Design ==
The shield design represents the ebb and flow of the Waikato river that runs through the city, the oxen represents the green pastures and the role of the city as a centre of agriculture. The crown evokes Hamilton's beginnings as a military post in the 19th century. Two pukeko, a common bird in the low lying country around the city, support the crest.

== Blazon ==
Escutcheon: Barry-wavy of eight argent and azure; on a bend verte, 3 oxen heads erased, or;

Crest: A mural crown;

Supporters: A pūkeko, on either side, rampant proper.
