= Dorothy Jelicich =

New Zealand politician

Dorothy Jelicich QSO
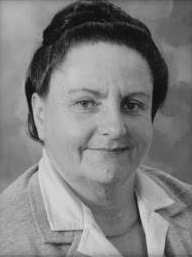

Member of the New Zealand Parliament for Hamilton West
- In office 25 November 1972 – 30 October 1975
- Preceded by: Leslie Munro
- Succeeded by: Mike Minogue

Personal details
- Born: Dorothy Catherine MacDonald; 19 January 1928 Sydney, New South Wales, Australia
- Died: 10 April 2015 (aged 87) Ōtāhuhu, New Zealand
- Party: Labour
- Spouse: Paul Stephen Jelicich (m. 1949; died 2014)

Dorothy Catherine Jelicich QSO (née MacDonald, 19 January 1928 – 10 April 2015) was a New Zealand politician of the Labour Party. She served one term in the House of Representatives representing the Hamilton West electorate, and was afterwards a city councillor in Hamilton and then Manukau.

== Early life and family ==
Jelicich was born in Sydney on 19 January 1928. Her father was a semi-skilled labourer. She was educated at Epsom Girls' Grammar School and the Elam School of Fine Arts. In 1949 she married Paul Jelicich, a bricklayer, and, with family support, she opened a restaurant in the Auckland suburb of Papatoetoe. Purchasing a small dairy farm at Bombay in 1964, the couple took up farming, but in 1970 she became a shoe store manager and then a trade union organiser.

== Political career ==
New Zealand Parliament
Years	Term	Electorate	Party
1972–1975	37th	Hamilton West	Labour

Jelicich, through her union job, became a member of the Labour Party and became a member of the executive of the Manurewa electorate and president of the Papatoetoe electorate committee. She stood unsuccessfully as a candidate for Hauraki in 1969. In 1972 she won the seat of Hamilton West for Labour by defeating Hamilton City Councillor Derek Heather after the incumbent, Leslie Munro of the National Party, retired. She became the first woman in New Zealand parliamentary history to open the Address-in-Reply debate. In 1975 she lost her seat to Mike Minogue.

Following her defeat she stood for the vice-presidency of the Labour Party at the 1976 party conference. She lost to Gerald O'Brien, placing second in the delegate ballot with a credible 344 votes to O'Brien's 585. In early 1977 she stood as a candidate for the Labour Party nomination in the Māngere by-election. She had the backing of both the outgoing MP Colin Moyle, Labour leader Bill Rowling, but regardless she lost out to future Prime Minister David Lange. She contested the Hamilton West electorate once more in the 1978 election.

She briefly served on the Hamilton City Council after winning a by-election in 1979. She unsuccessfully stood for the Labour nomination at the 1980 Onehunga by-election. Just as in Mangere she gathered much support among local members but again missed out, narrowly losing to Fred Gerbic. In 1982 (via another by-election) she became a Manukau City Councillor, representing Mangere Ward until she retired in 1995.

== Honours and awards ==
In the 1986 New Year Honours, Jelicich was appointed a Companion of the Queen's Service Order for public services. In 1990, she received the New Zealand 1990 Commemoration Medal, and in 1993, she was awarded the New Zealand Suffrage Centennial Medal.

== Death ==
Jelicich died on 10 April 2015 at Middlemore Hospital, Auckland at the age of 87, having been predeceased by her husband in October the previous year. She was survived by their three children.

== Notes ==
New Zealand Parliament
Preceded by Leslie Munro	Member of Parliament for Hamilton West; 1972–1975	Succeeded by Mike Minogue
