= Michael Redman (politician) =

New Zealand politician

32nd Mayor of Hamilton
- In office 2004 – May 2007
- Preceded by: David Braithwaite
- Succeeded by: Bob Simcock
- Majority: 12,420

Personal details
- Born: Michael Gerard Redman; 4 March 1966 (age 60) Yorkshire, England
- Spouse: Kelly

Michael Gerard Redman (born 4 March 1966) is a former New Zealand local government administrator and past politician. He was the chief executive of Auckland Tourism, Events and Economic Development, an Auckland Council organisation that came into being in November 2010, until his abrupt resignation in October 2011. He was chief executive of Hamilton City Council from May 2007 to October 2010. He was Mayor of Hamilton from 2004 to May 2007. When he resigned to become the chief executive of Hamilton City Council, he was replaced by deputy mayor and former Member of Parliament Bob Simcock.

In 2006 Michael Redman was a named an Emerging Leader in the Sir Peter Blake Leadership Awards.

== Career ==
Michael Redman attended school at St John's College in Hamilton and then spent 18 years in business. In 1986 he started his own advertising firm which he ran for 14 years. After the business was acquired in 2000 by Grey Group, he headed the New Zealand branch of the merged business for nearly three years. He was elected to the governing board of the Communication Agencies Association in 2002. Redman was also co-owner and director of a local clothing design, manufacturing and import business and a member of the Institute of Directors.

He started the domestic basketball team New Zealand Breakers, a full-time professional club playing in the Australian National Basketball League, but sold his interest in the club after being elected mayor. He served seven years on the board of the Northern Districts Cricket Association, eventually becoming deputy chairman.

He has served as Deputy Chairman of Parentline Trust and was a member of the Violence Intervention Pilot (VIP) Working Group. He was founding Chairman of Hamilton Combined Foodbanks Trust.

Redman resigned as Hamilton City Council Chief Executive in October 2010 to be chief executive of Auckland Tourism, Events and Economic Development (ATEED), an Auckland Council organisation.

Michael Redman resigned from ATEED on 28 October 2011 after a commercial review of the processes followed by Hamilton City Council in relation to the V8 Supercars Event, commissioned by Hamilton Council from Audit New Zealand in February 2011, raised compliance issues and claimed millions of dollars were spent on the Hamilton V8 Supercars stage without council's full knowledge. Michael Redman rejected outright the major findings of the Audit NZ report.

Political offices
Preceded by David Braithwaite	Mayor of Hamilton, New Zealand; 2004–2007	Succeeded by Bob Simcock
