= 2016 Hamilton mayoral election =

Local election in New Zealand

- 8 October 2016
- Turnout: 32,950
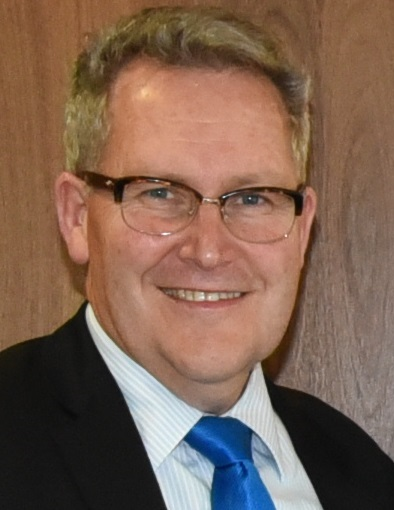

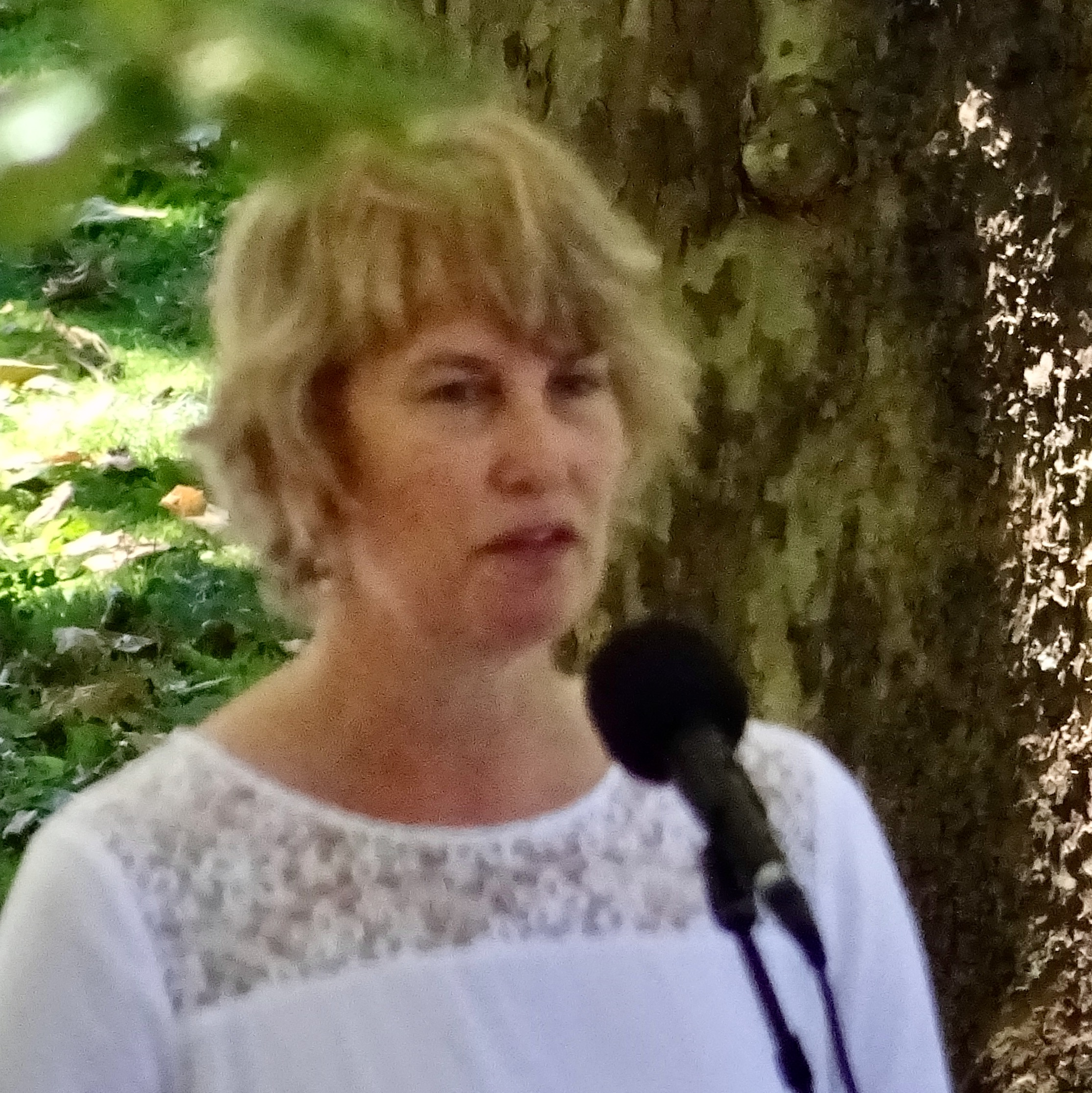
Candidate	Andrew King	Paula Southgate
Party	Independent	Independent
Popular vote	8,726	8,720
Percentage	26.57	26.56
Mayor before election
Julie Hardaker
Elected mayor
Andrew King

The 2016 Hamilton City mayoral election is part of the New Zealand local elections and held to determine the next mayor of the Hamilton City Council. The incumbent Julie Hardaker, who was first elected in the 2010 mayoral election did not stand for re-election. Confirmed candidates included current Waikato Regional Council chair Paula Southgate, East Ward Councillor Rob Pascoe, West Ward Councillor Andrew King, and former business manager at Hamilton City Council Chris Simpson. Andrew King won with a nine-vote margin, amended to 6 votes in a recount.

== Candidates ==
Seven nominees contested the office of mayor. In September 2016, an investigation into the fridges of the candidates was published in the media.

=== Confirmed ===
- James Casson, ex policeman.
- Arshad Chatha, ran in 2013 election.
- Rob Pascoe, East Ward Councillor since 2013.
- Jack Gielen, independent.
- Andrew King, West Ward Councillor since 2013.
- Chris Simpson, former business manager at Hamilton City Council.
- Paula Southgate, incumbent chair of the Waikato Regional Council.

=== Declined ===
- Julie Hardaker, the incumbent mayor announced she would not contest the 2016 mayoral election in March 2016.
- Ewan Wilson, current Waikato DHB member and West Ward Councillor who announced he would not be contesting the 2016 Hamilton City Council Elections.

== Results ==
The results were initially declared on 14 October 2016. Amended results were declared on 28 October 2016.

2016 Hamilton mayoral election
Party	Candidate	Votes	%	±%
lovehamilton	Andrew King	8,726	26.57	
Independent	Paula Southgate	8,720	26.56	
None	Chris Simpson	6,425	19.57	
Independent	James Casson	4,237	12.90	
Independent	Rob Pascoe	3,774	11.49	
None	Arshad Chatha	496	1.51	−0.55
Independent	Jack Gielen	458	1.39	+0.23
Majority		6	0.02	
Total valid votes		32,836	99.65	
Informal votes		114	0.34	−0.01
Turnout		32,950		
