= Tim Macindoe =

New Zealand politician (born 1961)

The Honourable Tim Macindoe
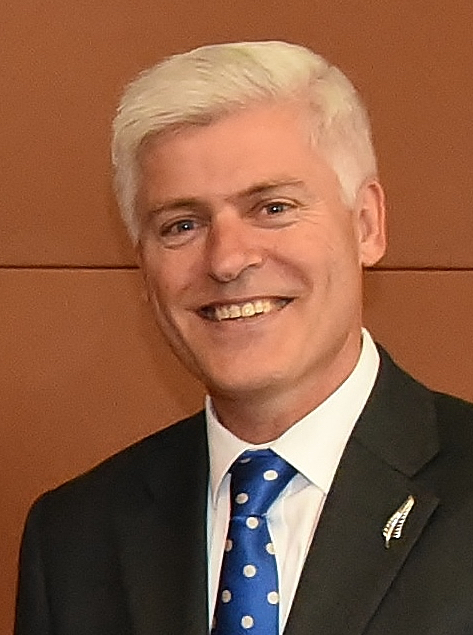
- Macindoe in 2017

37th Mayor of Hamilton
- Incumbent
- Assumed office 19 October 2025
- Deputy: Geoff Taylor
- Preceded by: Paula Southgate

62nd Minister of Customs
- In office 2 May 2017 – 26 October 2017
- Prime Minister: Bill English
- Preceded by: Nicky Wagner
- Succeeded by: Meka Whaitiri

Chief Government Whip
- In office 7 October 2014 – 2 May 2017
- Prime Minister: John Key; Bill English
- Preceded by: Louise Upston
- Succeeded by: Jami-Lee Ross

Deputy Chief Government Whip
- In office 29 January 2013 – 7 October 2014
- Prime Minister: John Key
- Preceded by: Louise Upston
- Succeeded by: Jami-Lee Ross

Hamilton City Councillor for the East Ward
- In office 19 February 2024 – 22 October 2025
- Preceded by: Ryan Hamilton

Member of the New Zealand Parliament for Hamilton West
- In office 8 November 2008 – 17 October 2020
- Preceded by: Martin Gallagher
- Succeeded by: Gaurav Sharma

Personal details
- Born: Timothy Harley Macindoe; 1961 (age 64–65) Auckland, New Zealand
- Party: National
- Spouse: Anne
- Children: Two daughters
- Education: Knox College, Otago; University of Waikato
- Profession: Teacher, chief executive
- Committees: Foreign Affairs, Defence, and Trade Committee
- Website: National Party website

Timothy Harley Macindoe (born 1961) is a New Zealand politician who has served as the mayor of Hamilton since 2025. Macindoe was previously a Member of Parliament for the Hamilton West electorate from 2008 to 2020. He served as the Minister of Customs for the final six months of the Fifth National Government.

== Early life and career ==
Macindoe was born in Auckland, New Zealand, and boarded at King's College for his secondary education. He later attended Otago University, graduating with a Bachelor of Arts with Honours in History. Macindoe was a secondary teacher for 17 years. He taught at several independent schools, including Christ's College, King's College, and St Peter's School in Cambridge, where he was deputy principal for six years. He has also held roles in retail, agriculture and as a prison tutor.

In 2009, Macindoe completed his second degree; an LLB from the University of Waikato.

Immediately prior to his election to Parliament in 2008, he was chief executive of the Music and Art Waikato Trust (Arts Waikato), based in Hamilton.

== Early political career ==
Macindoe made four unsuccessful attempts to enter Parliament before finally seeing success at the 2008 general election.

In 1996, Macindoe unsuccessfully stood for United New Zealand in the Karapiro electorate and was ranked 11th on the United party list. He thereafter joined the National Party and stood unsuccessfully in 1999 (as a list-only candidate, ranked 52nd), 2002 (in Tauranga, ranked 39th), and 2005 (in Hamilton West, ranked 62nd).

Through the same period, Macindoe held senior roles within the New Zealand National Party, including as chairman of the Hamilton West electorate, deputy chair of National's Central North Island regional organisation, and Central North Island regional policy chair.

== Member of Parliament ==
New Zealand Parliament
Years	Term	Electorate	List	Party
2008–2011	49th	Hamilton West	55	National
2011–2014	50th	Hamilton West	49	National
2014–2017	51st	Hamilton West	28	National
2017–2020	52nd	Hamilton West	25	National

In the 2008 election, Macindoe won the Hamilton West electorate by a margin of 1,618 votes, defeating incumbent Labour MP Martin Gallagher.

During his first term within Parliament, Macindoe was the deputy chair of the regulations review committee and a member of the social services committee.

In the 2011 New Zealand general election, Macindoe again won Hamilton West, defeating Labour Party list MP Sue Moroney by a margin of 4,418 votes. He continued sitting on the social services committee and also chaired the justice committee until 2013, when he was selected as the National Party's junior whip and transferred to the education and science committee.

In the 2014 New Zealand general election, Macindoe retained Hamilton West, defeating Moroney with a majority of 5,784 votes. Following the 2014 election, he was named as the National Party's senior whip.

During Prime Minister Bill English's second ministerial reshuffle in April 2017, Macindoe was appointed as Minister of Customs, Associate Minister of Education and Associate Minister of Transport. He held these positions for six months until the government was defeated at the 2017 general election.

In the 2017 New Zealand general election, Macindoe won Hamilton West by a margin of 7,731 votes, defeating Labour candidate Dr Gaurav Sharma. Following the formation of the Sixth Labour Government in October 2017, Macindoe was appointed the party's spokesperson for ACC, seniors and civil defense. He was also shadow attorney general between 2019 and 2020, sat on the education and workforce and the justice committee, and was deputy chair of the foreign affairs, defence and trade committee.

In late April 2020, Macindoe drew media attention and public criticism when he joked about pushing women off balconies during a live-stream session of the justice select committee during the COVID-19 pandemic in New Zealand. Macindoe subsequently apologised for his remarks but insisted he was joking.

At the 2020 general election, Macindoe was defeated in Hamilton West by Labour's Gaurav Sharma by a margin of 6,267 votes. At number 23 on the National Party list, Macindoe was ranked too low to return to Parliament on the party list. He did not seek the National Party nomination for the 2022 Hamilton West by-election, which was held following Sharma's resignation.

== Hamilton City Council ==
Macindoe was elected to the East Ward of the Hamilton City Council in a February 2024 by-election, replacing Ryan Hamilton after he was elected to parliament. Alongside his council role, Macindoe took up a paid lobbyist position for the University of Waikato, advocating local councils to support the creation of the university's medical school.

Macindoe ran in the 2025 Hamilton mayoral election and to retain his council seat in the 2025 elections. During the 2025 Hamilton mayoral election, Macindoe ran on a platform of "cost reductions" including lower rates and "slimming down" the Hamilton City Council. Macindoe was confirmed to have won the Mayoral Election on 18 October 2025 and was sworn is as Mayor for the 2025-2028 electoral term on 22 October 2025.

== Personal life and community involvement ==
He is married to Anne Macindoe, and they have two daughters. Outside Parliament, Macindoe is a parishioner at Holy Trinity Anglican Church, Forest Lake; and he is actively involved with a large number of organisations within his electorate including Orchestra Central Trustee, Waikato Chamber of Commerce, Hamilton Citizens' Band Society Vice-president, Epilepsy Waikato Charitable Trust (Patron), NZ Agricultural Fieldays Society, and Te Whare Korowai (Hamilton Christian Nightshelter Trust) .

Macindoe served on the boards of two local schools. Subsequently, he was chairperson of Waikato Diocesan School's PTA for four years. For nearly five years he served as a trustee for Free FM (Waikato's access radio station). He also participated on the committee that planned Hamilton's 150th anniversary celebrations in 2014. Previously, he chaired the Waikato/Bay of Plenty Regional Orchestra Steering Committee, and he served on the steering committee that culminated in the establishment of Sistema Waikato. He was a supporter of the Hamilton Hydrotherapy Pool Trust and dyed his hair blue in a successful fundraiser for the project in 2008.

== Political views ==
=== Smacking ===
Macindoe opposed the Crimes (Abolition of Force as a Justification for Child Discipline) Amendment Bill and supported the "no" vote in the corporal punishment referendum, 2009.

=== Same-sex marriage ===
Macindoe opposed the Marriage (Definition of Marriage) Amendment Act 2013, which legalized same-sex marriage in New Zealand. In Parliament, Macindoe cited his committed Christian beliefs in supporting his position, arguing that same-sex relationships could "never be regarded as true marriage" because they were "intrinsically different", and that "the nature of marriage should not be interfered with".

=== Euthanasia ===
MacIndoe voted against the End of Life Choice Act 2019 at all three readings.

=== Abortion ===
MacIndoe voted against the Abortion Legislation Act 2020 at all three readings.

New Zealand Parliament
Preceded by Martin Gallagher	Member of Parliament for Hamilton West; 2008–2020	Succeeded by Gaurav Sharma
