= 2019 Hamilton mayoral election =

Local election in New Zealand

- 12 October 2019
- Turnout: 40,015 (38.96%)
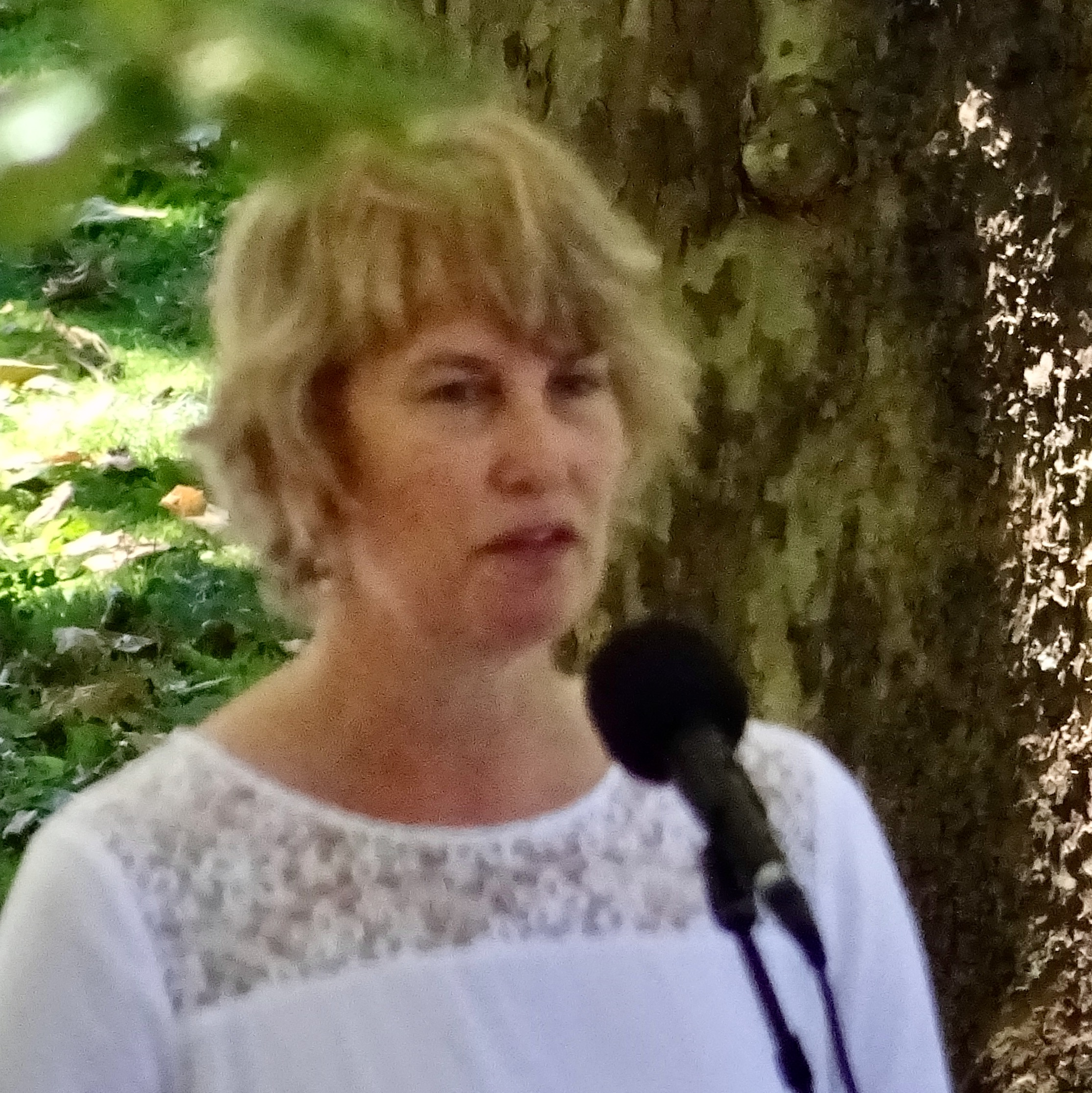

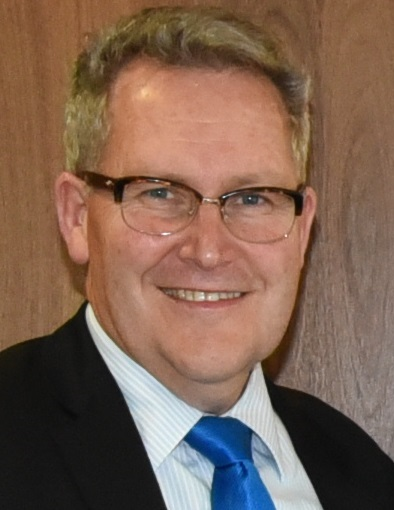
Candidate	Paula Southgate	Andrew King
Party	Independent	Independent
Popular vote	13,452	10,315
Percentage	33.74	25.87
Mayor before election
Andrew King
Elected mayor
Paula Southgate

The 2019 Hamilton City mayoral election was part of the New Zealand local elections and was held on 12 October 2019 to determine the Mayor of Hamilton.

== Key dates ==
Key dates for the election are:

- 1 July: Electoral Commission enrolment campaign starts.
- 19 July: Nominations open for candidates. Rolls open for inspection.
- 16 August: Nominations close at 12 noon. Rolls close.
- 21 August: Election date and candidates' names announced.
- 20 to 25 September: Voting documents delivered to households. Electors can post the documents back to electoral officers as soon as they have voted.
- 12 October: Polling day. Voting documents must be at council before voting closes at 12 noon. Preliminary results will be available as soon as all ordinary votes are counted.
- 17 to 23 October: Official results, including all valid ordinary and special votes, declared.

== Candidates ==
=== Declared candidates ===
- James Casson, Hamilton City Councillor
- Jack Gielen
- Louise Hutt
- Andrew King, incumbent Mayor of Hamilton
- Lisa Lewis
- Angela O'Leary, Hamilton City Councillor
- Paula Southgate, Hamilton City Councillor
- Mike West

=== Declined to be candidates ===
- Martin Gallagher, Deputy Mayor of Hamilton
- Geoff Taylor, Hamilton City Councillor

=== Endorsements ===
Louise Hutt was endorsed by Organise Aotearoa after surveying all the candidates.

== Campaign ==
The Employers and Manufacturers Association hosted a debate at Wintec on 4 September 2019. Hutt, King, O'Leary, Southgate and West attended. Another debate was held on 11 September 2019 at the event centre in Claudelands.

Paula Southgate was motivated to re-apply for mayoralty, after missing out in the previous election by only seven votes. Southgate claimed that it is easy for mayoral candidates to make lavish promises but that at the council table, they're only one voice. Gielen's broom symbolized a claimed need for a clean sweep of council, while the colourful head attire was to represent an inclusive community.

A Waikato Chamber of Commerce and Waikato Times poll conducted on 2 October found Southgate with 20.4% support, King with 14.1%, O'Leary with 13.7%, Casson with 3.1%, West on 3.0%, Hutt with 1.8%, Lewis with 1.5% and Gielen with 0.8%. Undecided voters made up 41.5% of respondents.

== Results ==
2019 Hamilton mayoral election
Party	Candidate	Votes	%	±%
Independent	Paula Southgate	13,452	33.74	+7.18
lovehamilton	Andrew King	10,315	25.87	−0.70
Independent	Angela O'Leary	7,870	19.74	
Independent	Louise Hutt	2,623	6.58	
None	Mike West	2,134	5.35	
Independent	James Casson	1,996	5.01	−7.89
Independent	Lisa Lewis	1,103	2.77	
Families4Justice	Jack Gielen	375	0.94	−0.45
Total valid votes		39,868	99.63	
Informal votes		147	0.37	+0.03
Majority		3,137	7.87	+7.89
Turnout		40,015	38.96	
Registered electors		102,714		
