= Grant Thomas (politician) =

New Zealand politician (born 1941)

New Zealand Parliament
Years	Term	Electorate	Party
1990–1993	43rd	Hamilton West	National

Grant Thomas (born 1941) is a New Zealand politician. He was the Member of Parliament for Hamilton West from 1990 to 1993, and a Hamilton city councillor from 1995 to 2007, including a period as deputy mayor.

== Biography ==
Thomas was born in 1941 and educated at Southwell School and Hamilton Boys' High School.

In the 1990 election Thomas stood for the National Party, taking the Hamilton West electorate from Trevor Mallard. However he lost it to Labour's Martin Gallagher in the 1993 election.

Thomas was a Hamilton city councillor from 1995 to 2007, when he stood down. Thomas served under five mayors during his twelve years of office in the council. In 2003 a comment about then-mayor David Braithwaite being a dictator prompted fellow councillor Bill Ward to question Thomas' support for the mayor. This led to Jody Garrett nominating Ward in a bid to replace Thomas as deputy mayor. The move ultimately failed, with ten councillors backing Thomas and only four supporting Ward.

In 2005 Thomas claimed that the 13 members of the city council were excessive, saying "[their] salary is too high for the workload". By reducing the number to ten, Thomas explained that the council could save NZ$150,000 annually.

Thomas now lives in Perth, Australia, with his family.

New Zealand Parliament
Preceded by Trevor Mallard	Member of Parliament for Hamilton West; 1990–1993	Succeeded by Martin Gallagher
