= Mike Minogue (politician) =

New Zealand politician (1923–2008)

Mike Minogue QSO

Member of the New Zealand Parliament for Hamilton West
- In office 1975–1984
- Preceded by: Dorothy Jelicich
- Succeeded by: Trevor Mallard

26th Mayor of Hamilton
- In office October 1968 – May 1976
- Preceded by: Denis Rogers
- Succeeded by: Bruce Beetham

Personal details
- Born: Michael John Minogue; 20 October 1923
- Died: 27 November 2008 (aged 85) Hamilton, New Zealand
- Party: National
- Other political affiliations: Liberal Party and Alliance

Michael John Minogue QSO (20 October 1923 – 27 November 2008) was a New Zealand National Party politician, lawyer and mayor.

== Biography ==
New Zealand Parliament
Years	Term	Electorate	Party
1975–1978	38th	Hamilton West	National
1978–1981	39th	Hamilton West	National
1981–1984	40th	Hamilton West	National

Minogue was born on 20 October 1923. He attended Timaru Boys' High School, St. Patrick's College Silverstream, and Victoria University.

He was Mayor of Hamilton, New Zealand from 1968 to 1976, when he resigned to become a Member of Parliament. He was never on good terms with his own party leader, Robert Muldoon, and strongly opposed many of his policies, particularly challenging him on the SIS Bill and cabinet's executive powers. Muldoon then invited him to resign from the party which Minogue refused to do.

He represented the Hamilton West electorate until the 1984 election, when he lost to Labour Party challenger Trevor Mallard.

In the 1990 Queen's Birthday Honours, Minogue was made a Companion of the Queen's Service Order for public services.

In 1993 Minogue left National to instead join the Liberal Party and endorsed the party's membership of the Alliance.

Mike attended the Australian Disaster Management School at Mount Macedon Victoria Australia in the 1970's to further his interest in planning for Hamilton and the Waikato region.

== Death ==
Minogue died on 27 November 2008 at Braemar Hospital, Hamilton, aged 85. He was survived by three children. His wife had predeceased him 19 years prior.

Political offices
Preceded by Denis Rogers	Mayor of Hamilton; 1968–1976	Succeeded by Bruce Beetham
New Zealand Parliament
Preceded by Dorothy Jelicich	Member of Parliament for Hamilton West; 1975–1984	Succeeded by Trevor Mallard
