= 2013 Hamilton mayoral election =

Local election in New Zealand

- 12 October 2013
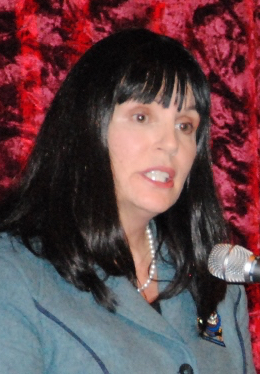
Candidate	Julie Hardaker	Ewan Wilson
Party	Independent	Independent
Popular vote	15,737	12,826
Percentage	43.6	35.5
Mayor before election
Julie Hardaker
Elected mayor
Julie Hardaker

The 2013 Hamilton mayoral election was part of the Hamilton and wider New Zealand local elections. On 12 October 2013, elections were held for the Mayor of Hamilton and other local government roles. The incumbent, Julie Hardaker, ran against seven other candidates and was re-elected with 43.6% of the vote, a 2,911-vote majority over Ewan Wilson who won 35.5%.

== Candidates ==
Eight candidates stood for election:

- Chatha Arshad
- Tony Dixon
- Jack Gielen (The Sovereignty Party)
- Ian Hanley
- Julie Hardaker
- Dave Macpherson
- Tim Wikiriwhi (Affordable Waikato)
- Ewan Wilson

== Campaign ==
All of the mayoral candidates except Wikiriwhi took part in a debate held at the Waikato Institute of Technology and chaired by Waikato Times editor Jonathan MacKenzie on 10 September 2013. According to Waikato Times editor Daniel Adams, about 200 people attended the debate, and the main issues were water metering and water fluoridation. The Waikato Chamber of Commerce and the Hamilton branch of the Property Council of New Zealand hosted a debate between Hardaker, Wilson and Macpherson on 17 September. The debate was chaired by the Property Council's vice-president Graham Dwyer and was attended by over 100 businesspeople, according to Kashka Tunstall of the Waikato Times.

== Opinion polls ==
A Waikato Times opinion poll completed on 26 August 2013 had Hardaker at 20% support, Wilson 10% and Macpherson 6%, with 49% of voters undecided. A second poll by the Waikato Times, completed on 24 September 2013 showed Hardaker steady at 20% and Wilson and Macpherson moving up to 18% and 8%, respectively. On 28 September, the day that the Waikato Times' second poll was published, Macpherson withdrew from the race and asked his supporters to back Wilson.

== Results ==
Hamilton mayoral election, 2013
Party	Candidate	Votes	%	±%
None	Julie Hardaker	15,737	43.61	+2.79
Independent	Ewan Wilson	12,826	35.55	
Independent	Dave Macpherson	2,963	8.21	
None	Tony Dixon	1,564	4.33	
Affordable Waikato	Tim Wikiriwhi	954	2.64	
Independent	Ian Hanley	876	2.43	
None	Arshad Chatha	743	2.06	
Sovereignty	Jack Gielen	419	1.16	−0.13
Majority		2,911	8.07	+5.21
Total valid votes		36,082	99.65	
Informal votes		128	0.35	
Turnout		36,210	37.23	
Registered electors		97,259		

Note that blank votes are not included. Swing is compared to 2010 results.
