= St John's College, Hamilton =

St John's College

Location
- 85 Hillcrest Road; Hamilton, 3216; New Zealand; 37°47′28″S 175°19′01″E

Information
- Type: State-integrated single-sex boys, secondary (year 9–13)
- Motto: Latin: Caritas Christi Urget Nos (The love of Christ urges us on)
- Established: As a part of an area school in 1923; separated in 1961; 65 years ago
- Ministry of Education Institution no.: 136
- Principal: Shane Tong
- Enrolment: 956 (July 2026)
- Website: stjohns-hamilton.school.nz

St John's College is a state-integrated Catholic boys' secondary school in Hamilton, New Zealand, with a school roll of 956 as of July 2026. The school crest features the eagle of St. John the Apostle, with the motto "Caritas Christi Urget Nos" strewn across the bottom, a Latin motto translating loosely into "Christ's love urges us on". The mission statement for the school is "Preparing Young Men For Life".

== History ==
A primary school was established by the Marist Brothers in 1922 on the site which is now Marian Catholic School. It became Marist High School. In 1961 it was renamed to St John's College, and it moved to its current Hillcrest Road location in February 1962.

== Enrolment ==
As of July 2026, St John's College has a roll of 956 students, of which 179 (18.7%) identify as Māori.

As of 2026, the school has an Equity Index of 428, placing it amongst schools whose students have few socioeconomic barriers to achievement (roughly equivalent to deciles 8 and 9 under the former socio-economic decile system).

== Facilities ==
A Pompallier technology centre was opened at St John's College in May 2002, which contains facilities for art, food technology, graphic design and materials technology classes. St John's College has an 3,360 square metres (36,200 sq ft) Astroturf centre, named the Paul Honiss Tennis and Hockey Centre. It was completed in May 2003 on a budget of NZ$250,000.

A new Sports Centre at the school was opened in early 2020, with New Zealand Prime Minister, Jacinda Ardern attending to visit the opening. The gym is estimated to be worth NZ $ 8 million, with the same building also supporting three new classrooms. This newly established area began construction in 2018 as a response to the roll increase of students at St John's College. An updated facility was required for all students to sufficiently participate in sports activities at the school. Sports that can be played at the new gymnasium include basketball, volleyball, badminton and futsal.

== Houses ==
St John's College has four houses. The houses are named after four prominent figures in the Catholic Faith.

- Chanel – Red
- Marcellin – Blue
- Pompallier – Green
- Roncalli – Gold

== Notable alumni ==
- Sosene Anesi – rugby union player
- David Bennett – politician
- Jayden Bezzant – basketball player
- Greg Foran — businessman
- Marty Holah – rugby union player
- Mike Homik – basketball player
- Paul Honiss – rugby union referee
- Pita Limjaroenrat, Thai politician.
- Benjamin Mitchell – actor
- Michael Redman – local-body politician and administrator
- Bob Simcock – poliitican
- Mark van Gisbergen – rugby union player

== See also ==
- List of schools in New Zealand

== See also ==
- Gallagher, Patrick Owen (1976). The Marist Brothers in New Zealand, Fiji & Samoa, 1876–1976. New Zealand Marist Brothers Trust Board.
