= Julie Hardaker =

New Zealand politician

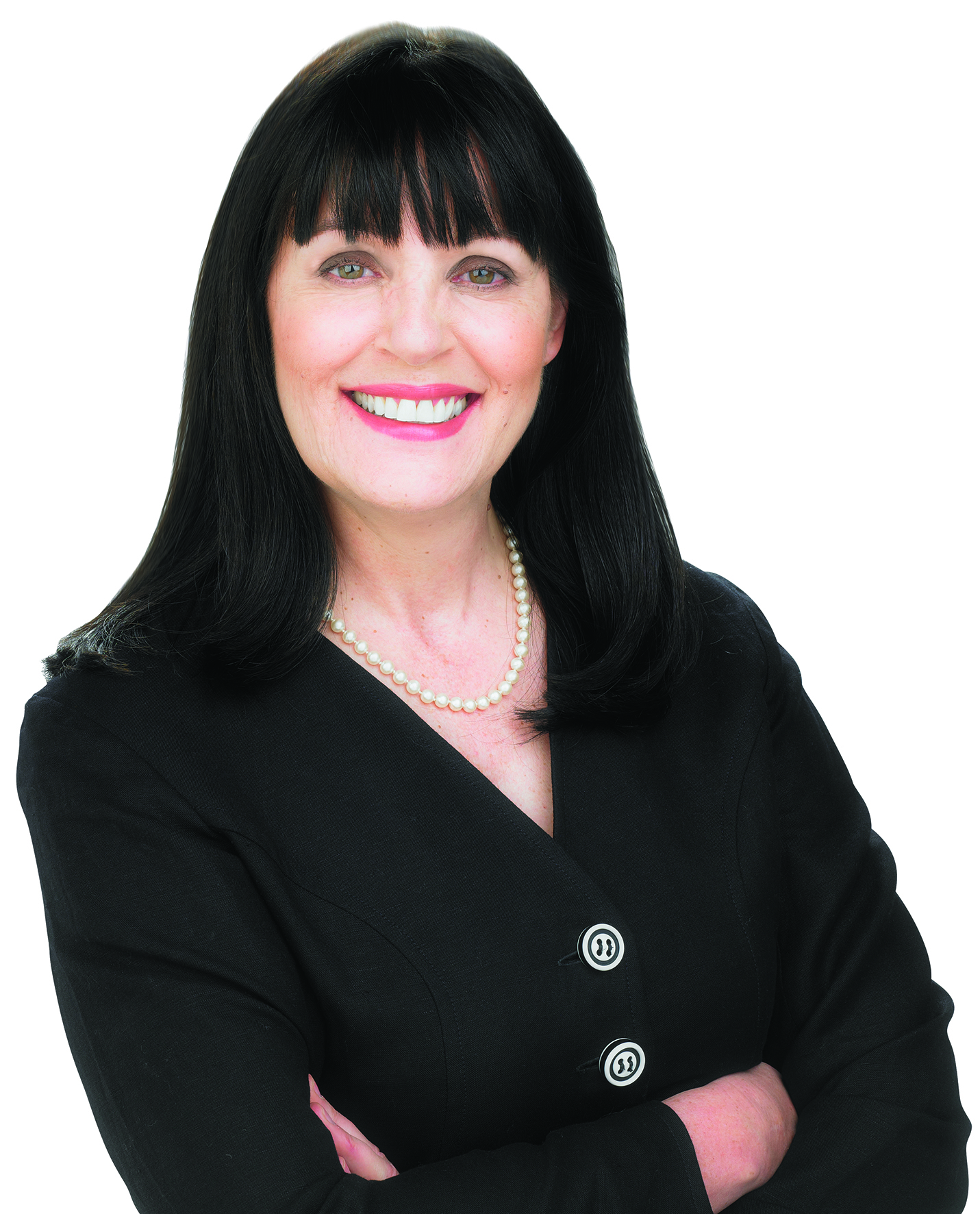
- Hardaker in 2013

34th Mayor of Hamilton
- In office 1 November 2010 – October 2016
- Deputy: Gordon Chesterman
- Preceded by: Bob Simcock
- Succeeded by: Andrew King

Personal details
- Born: 1960 (age 65–66)
- Spouse: Steven Perdia
- Children: 2 stepsons
- Education: University of Waikato Faculty of Law
- Occupation: Lawyer/Director
- Profession: Lawyer
- Website: Official website

Julie Hardaker was the Mayor of Hamilton, New Zealand, from October 2010 to October 2016. She was born in New Zealand. After graduating from the University of Waikato, she joined the Hamilton law firm McCaw Lewis Chapman and became a partner and held senior management roles. She is involved in various community and business organisations at a governance level. As a political novice, she defeated former Mayor and experienced politician Bob Simcock in the 2010 New Zealand local government elections. Hardaker was re-elected in the 2013 election beating her main rival Ewan Wilson, with a majority of 2911 votes, becoming the first mayor of Hamilton in nearly two decades to survive their first term in office. She was returned to power with an increased majority, capturing 43.6% of the valid mayoral votes cast. After completing two terms, she elected not to stand for election in 2016.

== Life outside politics ==
Hardaker grew up near Rotorua. She graduated from the University of Waikato Faculty of Law in 1995 as the top law student with LLB (Hons 1st class). Hardaker also holds a Masters of Management (Hons 1st class) degree from Waikato University.

After university she joined the Hamilton law firm McCaw Lewis Chapman, where she became a partner in 2000. She initially specialised in dispute resolution, before turning her attention to employment law. She chaired the law firm's governance board, and at the time of her election as Mayor of Hamilton, she was in charge of finance.

Following her retirement as Mayor, Hardaker returned to the law and established her own law firm in Hamilton and continues to practice law. In 2017 Hardaker was awarded a Chartered Fellow of the Chartered Governance Institute and has gone on to serve on public and private sector boards as well as voluntary not for profit board directorships. These have included Chair of the Environmental Protection Authority and Deputy Chair of Auckland Transport. She also served on the board of Chartered Governance Institute New Zealand and was President and Executive Director for three years until December 2024. Hardaker currently serves on a number of boards and is a director of Crown Entity Water Services Authority, Deputy Chair of Bay Venues Ltd (a Tauranga City Council Controlled Organisation), and a member of the Charities Registration Board. Hardaker is also a trustee of the Winston Churchill Memorial Trust and Chair of the Waikato's Orchestras Central Trust. Since 2017, Hardaker has chaired Women on Boards New Zealand, the only organisation in New Zealand dedicated to supporting women on to boards and she supports women in governance and leadership.

Hardaker is married to Steven Perdia.

== Political career ==
Hardaker entered the 2010 mayoral contest as a political newcomer, one of six candidates. Her main opponent was the experienced politician Bob Simcock, the incumbent Mayor, who has been on Hamilton City Council for 6 years. He had been appointed Mayor in 2007 following the resignation of his predecessor, and had represented Hamilton West in Parliament from 1996 until his defeat in 2002.

Hardaker campaigned for opening the books on the V8s, transparent government, city living and making the Waikato River accessible.

Of the 33,000 votes cast Hardaker and Simcock received 13,626 and 12,670, respectively, a majority of 956 votes and representing about 41% for Hardaker. A year into her reign, an opinion poll by the Waikato Times showed an almost unchanged level of support, with 40% of the respondents stating they would vote for her again if an election were held tomorrow.

She stood for re-election in the 2013 mayoral election. Her manifesto for her second term was managing finances, implementing the Waikato River Plan and investing in the city.

She was re-elected with 15737 votes over rival Ewan Wilson with 12826 votes, a 2911 majority which was a three-fold majority increase from 2010 and the first Mayor in Hamilton to be re-elected since Margaret Evans in 1995.

In March 2016 Hardaker announced that she would not be contesting the 2016 mayoral election and would be returning to her law career.

Hardaker described her greatest challenge during her term as Mayor as opening the books on the financial status of the V8 Super Car Racing, a major event which was entered into by the previous Council. Her leadership and resolve during the process, which included establishing a City financial recovery plan moving the Council out of a 9-year run of operating deficits, received accolades from across the political spectrum. In 2010 City debt was $422 million and forecast to increase to $830 million. By 2016 the council was running operating surpluses and debt had reduced to $348 million.

Hardaker listed other Mayoral legacies as the Central City Transformation Plan, Hamilton Gardens and Hamilton City River Plan which is a 30-year visionary document containing a mix of short and long-term projects along 16 km of the Waikato River that would transform the city's relationship with the river. During her term the Hamilton Gardens won "World Garden of the Year" at the International Garden Tourism Awards in Metz, France.

Her performance as Mayor was graded an "A" having delivered on election promises through a combination of hard work, intelligence and unwavering self-belief.

At Hardaker's final Council meeting the City presented to her a new garden rose breed called 'Julie Marguerite' which is now grown at the Hamilton Gardens.

Political offices
Preceded by Bob Simcock	Mayor of Hamilton; 2010–2016	Succeeded by Andrew King
