= Judicial review in New Zealand =

Judicial review, under which executive actions of the Government are subject to review, and possible invalidation, is used in New Zealand. Judicial review is carried out by a judge of the High Court of New Zealand. Legislative action is not justiciable in the High Court under New Zealand's Westminster constitutional arrangements; Parliament remains supreme in law.

Part 1 of that the Judicature Amendment Act 1972 was re-enacted by Parliament via the Judicial Review Procedure Act 2016.

It states in Section 3:
(1) The purpose of this Act is to re-enact Part 1 of the Judicature Amendment Act 1972, which sets out procedural provisions for the judicial review of—
(a) the exercise of a statutory power:
(b) the failure to exercise a statutory power:
(c) the proposed or purported exercise of a statutory power.
(2) The reorganisation in this Act of those provisions, and the changes made to their style and language, are not intended to alter the interpretation or effect of those provisions as they appeared in the Judicature Amendment Act 1972.'

== See also ==
- Law of New Zealand
