= Simcock House (Swansea, Massachusetts) =

Historic house in Massachusetts, United States

- U.S. National Register of Historic Places
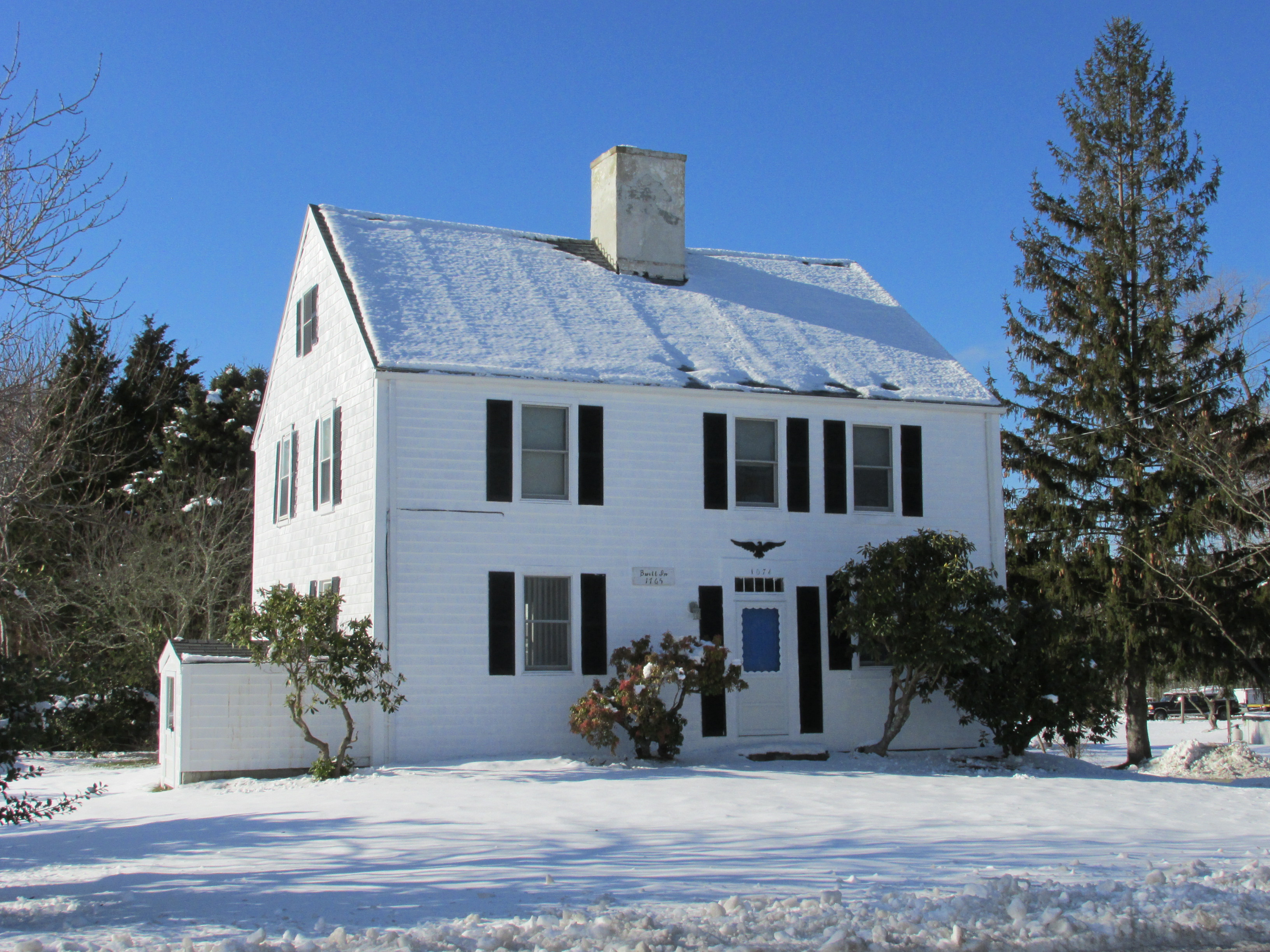
- Simcock House

- Location within Massachusetts Location within the United States
- Location: 1074 Sharps Lot Road, Swansea, Massachusetts
- Coordinates: 41°46′49″N 71°10′19″W
- Built: 1765
- Architectural style: Georgian
- MPS: Swansea MRA
- NRHP reference No.: 90000063
- Added to NRHP: February 16, 1990

The Simcock House is a historic house in Swansea, Massachusetts. Construction of this 2 1/2-story vernacular Georgian house is estimated to have been around 1765; little is known of its history before the 19th century. It is architecturally unusual, with three asymmetrically placed bays and a large central chimney. The door is in the center bay, with a window above that is slightly narrower than the flanking windows.

The house was listed on the National Register of Historic Places in 1990.

== See also ==
- National Register of Historic Places listings in Bristol County, Massachusetts
