= Bob Simcock =

New Zealand politician

33rd Mayor of Hamilton, New Zealand
- In office 23 May 2007 – 31 October 2010
- Preceded by: Michael Redman
- Succeeded by: Julie Hardaker
- Majority: 10,798 (34.24%)

Member of the New Zealand Parliament for National party list
- In office 1999–2002

Member of the New Zealand Parliament for Hamilton West
- In office 1996–1999
- Preceded by: Martin Gallagher
- Succeeded by: Martin Gallagher

Personal details
- Born: 1947 (age 78–79)
- Party: National

Robert Malcolm Simcock (born 1947) is a New Zealand politician. He was a Member of Parliament for the National Party from 1996 to 2002 and Mayor of Hamilton from 2007 to 2010.

== Early career ==
Simcock attended St John's College before graduating from the University of Waikato with a M Soc Sci (Hons). Before entering politics, Simcock worked both as a deer farmer and as a clinical psychologist.

== Member of Parliament ==
New Zealand Parliament
Years	Term	Electorate	List	Party
1996–1999	45th	Hamilton West	45	National
1999–2002	46th	List	22	National

Simcock was an MP from 1996 to 2002, representing the National Party. He was first elected in the 1996 election as MP for Hamilton West, defeating the incumbent, Martin Gallagher of the Labour Party. In the 1999 election, Gallagher retook the seat from Simcock, who returned to Parliament as a list MP. In the 2002 election, Simcock again trailed Gallagher in Hamilton West, and National Party votes nationwide dropped enough that Simcock was not re-elected as a list MP.

== Local government ==
Simcock was elected to the Hamilton City Council for the West Ward in the 2004 election and appointed Deputy Mayor that year. Following Michael Redman's resignation, he was appointed Mayor of Hamilton in May 2007. He was elected mayor in the October 2007 election with over 50% of the votes cast. He lost the 2010 mayoral election to Julie Hardaker.

Simcock was elected to the Waikato Regional Council in 2013 and re-elected in 2016.

== Other activities ==
Simcock was appointed as the chair of the Waikato District Health Board by the Minister of Health in 2013. He resigned as chair and board member on 28 November 2017, following the resignation of Waikato DHB chief executive Nigel Murray, amidst a State Services Commission investigation into allegations of wrongful expenditure of public money by Murray. Murray was seen as Simcock's appointment by former CEO Craig Climo; Climo and former Labour MP Sue Moroney said they advised against hiring Dr Murray.

New Zealand Parliament
Preceded by Martin Gallagher	Member of Parliament for Hamilton West; 1996–1999	Succeeded by Martin Gallagher
Political offices
Preceded by Michael Redman	Mayor of Hamilton, New Zealand; 2007–2010	Succeeded by Julie Hardaker
Preceded by Graeme Milne	Chairperson of Waikato District Health Board; 2013–2017	Succeeded by Sally Webb; Crown Monitor
