= Martin Gallagher =

New Zealand politician

Martin Gallagher JP
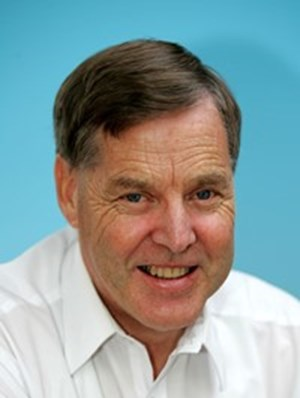

Member of the New Zealand Parliament for Hamilton West
- In office 6 November 1993 – 12 October 1996
- Preceded by: Grant Thomas
- Succeeded by: Bob Simcock
- In office 27 November 1999 – 8 November 2008
- Preceded by: Bob Simcock
- Succeeded by: Tim Macindoe

Personal details
- Born: 11 February 1952 (age 74) Hamilton, New Zealand
- Party: Labour
- Children: 4
- Occupation: Teacher

Martin Owen Gallagher JP (born 11 February 1952) is a former New Zealand politician and was a member of Parliament representing the Hamilton West electorate from 1993 until 1996, as well as, from 1999 until 2008. A member of the Labour Party. He went on to serve as a Hamilton City Councillor for the West Ward as well as Deputy Mayor of Hamilton from 1988 to 1993, and again under Andrew King from 2016 to 2019.

== Early life ==
Gallagher was educated at Hamilton Boys' High School, and the University of Waikato where he completed a Bachelor of Social Science degree. He is a qualified teacher.

== Political career ==
=== Member of Parliament ===
New Zealand Parliament
Years	Term	Electorate	List	Party
1993–1996	44th	Hamilton West		Labour
1999–2002	46th	Hamilton West	none	Labour
2002–2005	47th	Hamilton West	31	Labour
2005–2008	48th	Hamilton West	32	Labour

He was first elected to Parliament in the 1993 election, when he won the Hamilton West electorate. In the 1996 election, however, he was defeated by National's Bob Simcock. In the 1999 election, he won back the electorate. At the 2005 election, he had a slender majority of 825 votes, 2.0% more than his opponent. In the 2008 general election he was defeated by National's Tim Macindoe. His list placing of 41 meant that he was not returned to Parliament. The swing in Hamilton West at the 2008 election against Gallagher was less than half the nationwide swing against his Government.

Gallagher was Chairperson of the Foreign Affairs, Defence and Trade Select Committee and formerly the Law and Order Select Committee.

=== Local body politics ===
Before standing for Parliament, Gallagher was a councillor for the Hamilton City Council from 1985–1994, and served as Deputy Mayor of Hamilton from 1988 to 1993, and again from 2016 to 2019.

After losing his Parliamentary seat in 2008, Gallagher returned to local body politics. In the 2010 and 2013 local elections, he ran for the Hamilton City Council and the Waikato District Health Board as an independent candidate. He was returned for both positions in each election.

== Personal life ==
Gallagher has four children and is a cousin of Sir William Gallagher, of the well known Waikato family who run Gallagher Group, an international farming and security company.

Gallagher is a Justice of the Peace. He returned to teaching after being ousted in the 2008 election.

New Zealand Parliament
Preceded by Grant Thomas	Member of Parliament for Hamilton West; 1993–1996; 1999–2008	Succeeded by Bob Simcock
Preceded by Bob Simcock	Member of Parliament for Hamilton West; 1993–1996; 1999–2008	Succeeded by Tim Macindoe
