= Hamilton City Council (New Zealand) =

Territorial authority of New Zealand

Coordinates: 37.7882762°S 175.2785522°E

Hamilton City Council Te Kaunihera o Kirikiriroa
- Coat of arms

- Brand logo

Type
- Type: Territorial authority of Hamilton
- Term limits: None

History
- Established: 1 November 1989; 36 years ago
- Preceded by: Hamilton City Council
- New session started: 19 October 2025

Leadership
- Mayor: Tim Macindoe, Ind. since 19 October 2025
- Deputy: Geoff Taylor, Ind. since 29 October 2025
- CEO: Lance Vervoort since 2 September 2021

Structure
- Seats: 15 (including mayor)
- Political groups: Independent (11); Better Hamilton (4)

Elections
- Voting system: Single transferable vote
- First election: 14 October 1989
- Last election: 11 October 2025
- Next election: 14 October 2028

Meeting place
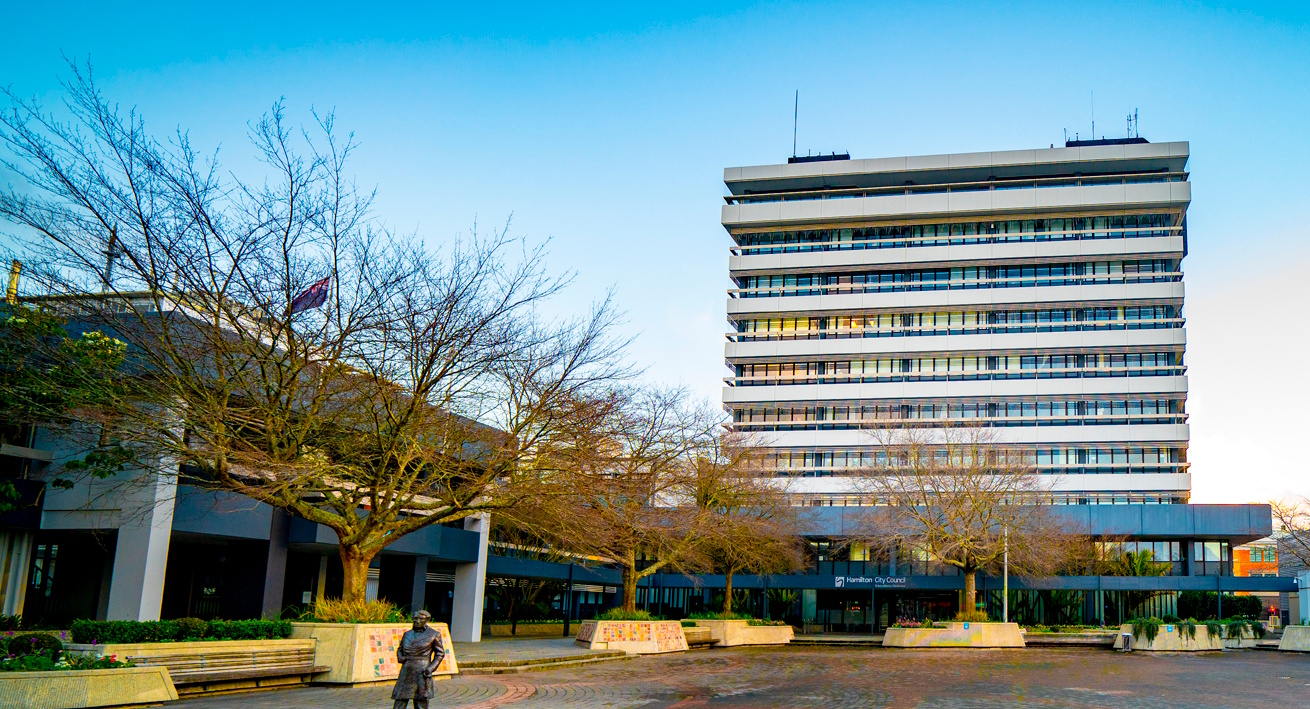
- 260 Anglesea St

Website
- hamilton.govt.nz

Hamilton City Council (Māori: Te Kaunihera o Kirikiriroa) is the territorial authority for the city of Hamilton, New Zealand. It serves as the city's local government alongside the Waikato Regional Council as the regional council.

A borough council for the area was first formed in 1877, which was granted city status in 1945. Following the 1989 reforms to local government, that city council was dissolved and the current authority established.

The governing body of council has 14 councillors and is chaired by the mayor of Hamilton (currently Tim Macindoe since October 2025).

== History ==
=== Predecessor ===
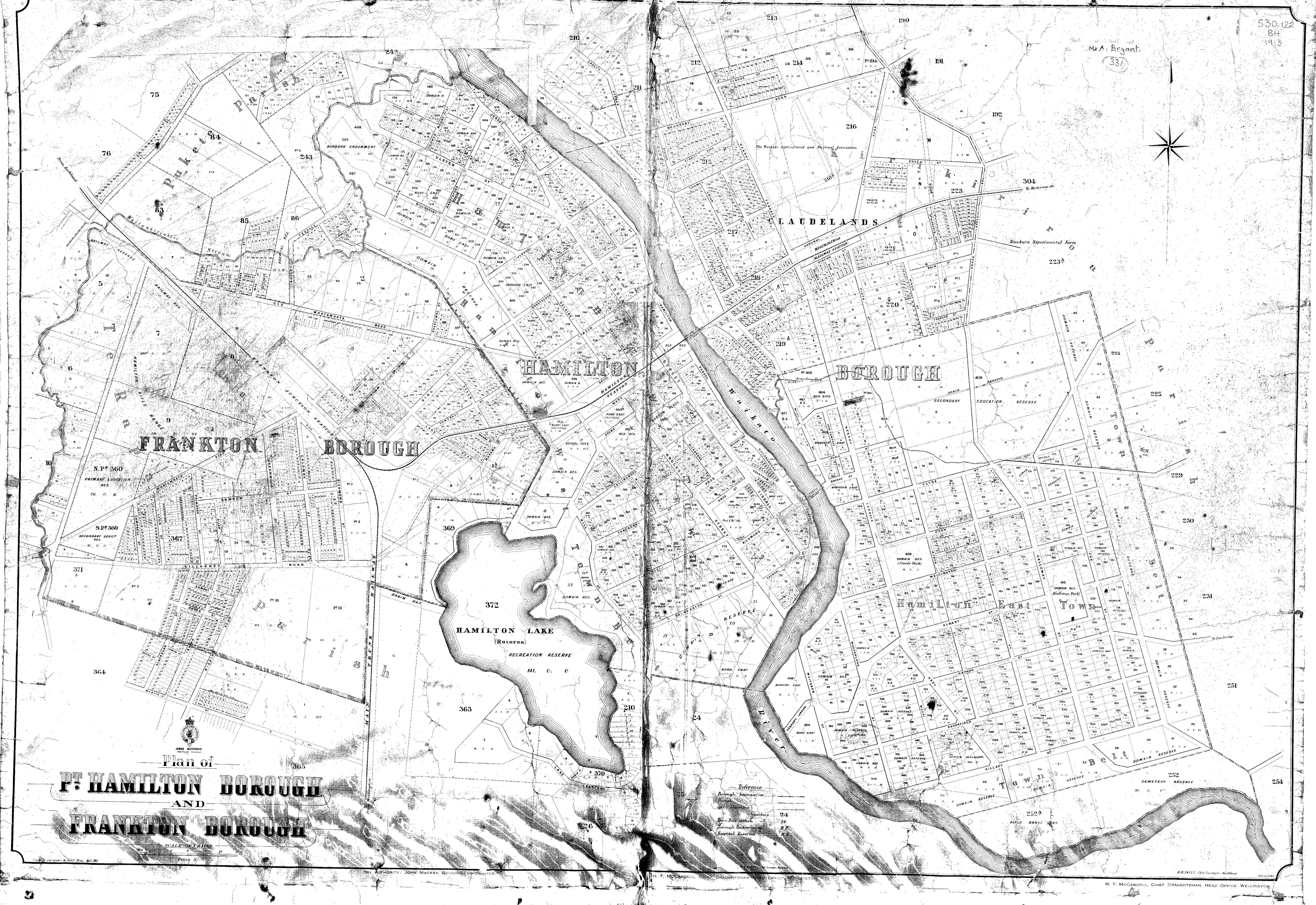
1913 Hamilton map showing the extent of Frankton and Hamilton boroughs and the Town Belt

Several councils, boards and committees preceded the council. The first local authority in the area was Kirikiriroa Road Board formed by a meeting in 1868. Kirikiriroa Road Board covered the east bank of the Waikato from Tamahere to Taupiri. Hamilton East took over its area from the Road Board in 1872 and the Board had its last meeting on 7 March 1921, before becoming part of Waikato County. Hamilton West Highway District was set up on 14 August 1871 and a similar district for Hamilton East shortly after. Hamilton parish vestry committee was formed in 1876 and Hamilton Borough Council was first elected on 7 February 1878. The Frankton Borough Council was formed in 1913, but merged with Hamilton in 1917, after a poll in 1916.

=== 1989 reforms ===
The current city council was formed as part of the 1989 local government reorganisation, which added parts of Waikato and Waipā counties to the previous city area. The original Hamilton borough had an area of 752 ha (1,860 acres). It now covers 9,860 ha (24,400 acres), which includes 2,500 ha (6,200 acres) of Rototuna, Rotokauri and Peacocke added in 1989, and 430 ha (1,100 acres) of Temple View added on 1 July 2004.

== Governing body ==
Wards of the Hamilton City Council.

The governing body of council consists of a mayor elected at-large and 14 councillors, elected from three wards.

=== Mayor ===
The mayor of Hamilton is the head of local government in the city. They chair meetings of the governing body.

=== Current composition ===
The current members of the governing body of council are:

Role	Portrait	Name	Affiliation	Ward
Mayor		Tim Macindoe	Independent	Elected at-large
Deputy		Geoff Taylor	Independent	West
Councillor		Angela O'Leary	Independent	West
Councillor		Emma Pike	Independent	West
Councillor		Graeme Mead	Better Hamilton	West
Councillor		Mesh Macdonald	Better Hamilton	West
Councillor		Sarah Thomson	Independent	West
Councillor		Andrew Bydder	Better Hamilton	East
Councillor		Anna Casey-Cox	Independent	East
Councillor		Jamie Strange	Independent	East
Councillor		Leo Liu	Better Hamilton	East
Councillor		Rachel Karalus	Independent	East
Councillor		Sue Moroney	Independent	East
Councillor		Maria Huata	Independent	Kirikiriroa Māori
Councillor		Robbie Neha	Independent	Kirikiriroa Māori

== Wards ==
Two general wards, East and West, have six councillors each, elected by voters on the general electoral roll. The East and West wards cover half the city, with the boundary between the two being the Waikato River.

Kirikiriroa Maaori ward covers the whole city and has two councillors, elected by voters on the Māori electoral roll.

== Offices ==
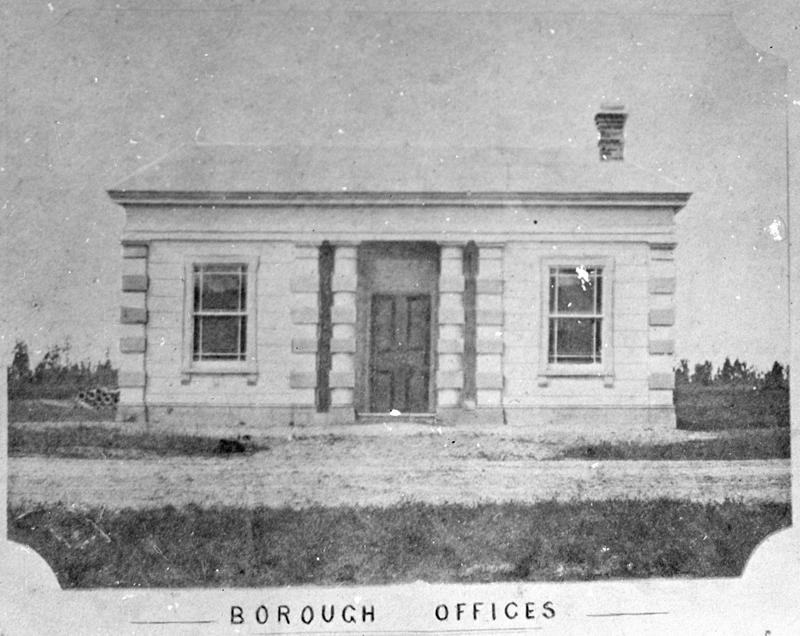
1878 Hamilton Borough Chambers, near 360 Victoria St

Hamilton Borough Council first met in Collingwood Street courthouse. In April 1878 an immigrant cottage on Victoria Street was adapted as council chambers. After 1905 it was used as an insurance office, until demolished for the Security Building in 1924. That building was replaced by the Novotel, which opened in 1999.

On 23 March 1905 Richard Seddon opened a £3,510 town hall, with a council chamber, further south, near the Municipal Baths. It was enlarged in 1914 and demolished in 1967.

On 22 October 1932 ferro-concrete offices and a gas showroom were opened in Alma Street, bringing all the offices together, at a cost of £10,082, paid for by profits from electricity supply. On 2 July 1949 1XH Hamilton started broadcasting from the basement of the Alma Street offices. When the council moved in 1960, 1XH took over the whole building, then 1YW took over one of 1XH’s two studios and, in 1968, a television station also moved in. The building is protected by a District Plan heritage listing and is now occupied by several businesses.

In June 1960 the offices moved into a 4-storey building, with 2-storey wings (a library in the east wing), was opened in July 1960, between Anglesea, Caro and Worley Streets and a multi-storey block, built over Worley Street, added between 1980 and 1983.

== Coat of arms ==
Coat of arms of Hamilton
Notes Hamilton City adopted a coat of arms in 1946. The blazon is: Crest A mural crown. Escutcheon Barry-wavy of eight argent and azure; on a bend verte, 3 oxen heads erased, or. Supporters A pūkeko, on either side, rampant proper.

The city's coat of arms has received some criticism, being accused of not reflecting the history and diversity of the city, with suggestions that it should be changed.

== Elections ==
In 2020, the electoral system was changed from first-past-the-post to single transferable vote, following consultation in which 78.1% supported STV.

Phillip Yeung was re-elected as a Councillor in the East Ward in the 2016 election, but died in office in 2017. A by-election was held in February 2018 to replace Phillip and Councillor Ryan Hamilton was elected.

=== Council ===
- 1989
- 1992
- 1995
- 1998
- 2001
- 2004
- 2007
- 2010
- 2013
- 2016
- 2019
- 2022
- 2025

=== Mayoral ===
- 1989
- 1992
- 1995
- 1998
- 2001
- 2004
- 2007
- 2010
- 2013
- 2016
- 2019
- 2022
- 2025
