= Paula Southgate =

New Zealand politician

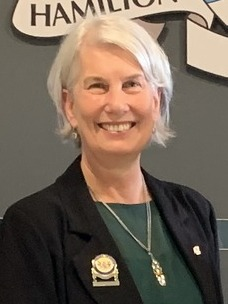
- Southgate in 2023

36th Mayor of Hamilton
- In office 24 October 2019 – 22 October 2025
- Deputy: Angela O'Leary
- Preceded by: Andrew King
- Succeeded by: Tim Macindoe

Personal details
- Born: Paula Anne Southgate; 1963 or 1964 (age 61–62)
- Spouse: Greg Forsyth
- Children: 3
- Occupation: Teacher; mental health counsellor
- Website: https://www.paulasouthgate.co.nz/

Paula Anne Southgate is a New Zealand politician. She has held several positions in local government since 2001. In October 2019 she was elected the Mayor of Hamilton and was re-elected in October 2022. She retired from the role at the 2025 local election.

== Early life ==
Southgate was born in 1963 or 1964 to Margaret Southgate and attended Hamilton Girls' High School and the University of Waikato. She worked as a teacher, a counsellor in the mental health sector, and served on two school boards of trustees.

== Local government ==
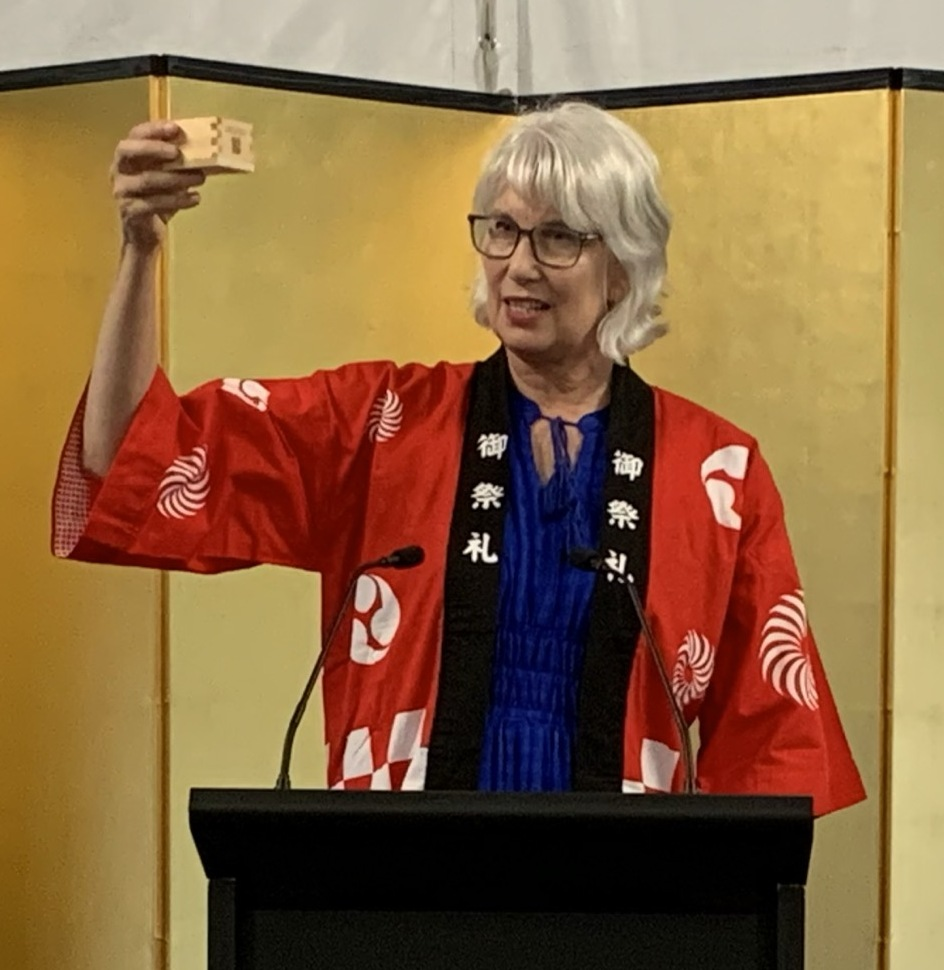
Southgate in 2025 at celebration of the Japanese Emperor's birthday

Southgate served as a councillor on the Waikato Regional Council from 2001 to 2016. In 2013 she was elected to be the council chair over Bob Simcock, with the support of eight out of fourteen councillors.

Southgate ran to be mayor of Hamilton and a Hamilton City Councillor in the 2016 local elections but lost to Andrew King. The election was close, with an election-day margin of nine votes reduced to six votes after a judicial recount. However, she was elected as a city councillor from the East ward.

In the 2019 local elections, although Southgate did not run for a councillor position, she did win the mayoralty with 33.74% of the vote and a majority of 3,137 votes over King, who had proposed renaming Hamilton to Kirikiriroa in spite of public opinion. Geoff Taylor was appointed as her deputy mayor.

Southgate sought and won a second mayoral term in the 2022 Hamilton mayoral election.

On 12 January 2025, Southgate confirmed that she would not be running for a third mayoral term during the 2025 New Zealand local elections.

== Personal life ==
Southgate is married to Greg Forsyth and has two daughters and a stepson.

Political offices
Preceded by Andrew King	Mayor of Hamilton; 2019–present	Incumbent
