= New Zealand Sovereignty Party =

Political party in New Zealand

New Zealand Sovereignty Party registered logo

The New Zealand Sovereignty Party was a political party in New Zealand. It was founded in 2010 by Southland businessman Tony Corbett.

The party advocated repealing the 2007 anti-smacking law and the New Zealand Emissions Trading Scheme, and supported free dental care for school children. It opposes mining in national parks and privatisation.

In June 2011 the party was conditionally awarded $20,000 of broadcasting funding for the 2011 election. On 19 October its logo was registered with the Electoral Commission.

The party stood two candidates in the 2011 election — Tony Corbett in Clutha-Southland and Robert Piriniha Wilson in Te Tai Hauāuru — and received 248 votes in total. It did not stand any candidates at the 2014 election.

Tony Corbett stood again for parliament in the 2023 general election. They contested the Upper Harbour electorate under the New Zealand Sovereignty Party name.
