= Sue Moroney =

New Zealand politician

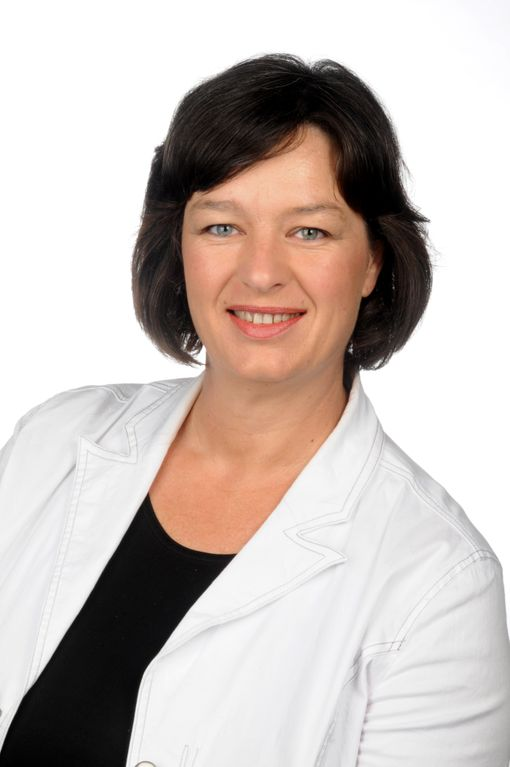

Member of the New Zealand Parliament for Labour Party list
- In office 17 September 2005 – 23 September 2017

Junior Government Whip
- In office 5 November 2007 – 11 November 2008
- Preceded by: Darren Hughes
- Succeeded by: Chris Tremain

Personal details
- Born: 8 May 1964 (age 62)
- Party: Labour
- Relations: Michael Moroney (brother)

Suzanne Mary Moroney (born 8 May 1964), generally known as Sue Moroney, is a New Zealand politician who is a member of the New Zealand Labour Party and was a Member of Parliament from 2005 general election until her retirement in 2017. She is currently the CEO of Community Law Centres Aotearoa, the national body of 24 Community Law Centres throughout New Zealand.

== Early life ==
Sue Moroney was raised in the Waikato. Her parents farmed 80 acres (32 ha) of land to provide an income for their family of seven. She grew up in Walton and attended Walton Primary School, then Matamata College. She became a journalist and then worked for the New Zealand Nurses Organisation for 12 years.

Moroney's family are keenly involved in horse racing. During her maiden speech Moroney quipped: "our family never had Michael Joseph Savage on our wall, but we did have a very tasteful mural of a horse race over our fireplace."

== Politics ==
Moroney has been endorsed as a candidate by the Labour Party on a number of occasions. In the first MMP election of 1996 she contested the seat of Karapiro and was 31st on the Labour list. In the 2002 election she again contested Piako but chose not to stand for the list.

In the 2005 election Moroney again contested Piako and, while unsuccessful in the electorate, was ranked 42nd on the Party List and was elected to Parliament as a list MP.

In the 2008 general election she was the Labour candidate in the seat of Hamilton East and was returned to parliament due to her list placing of 22.

=== Member of Parliament ===
New Zealand Parliament
Years	Term	Electorate	List	Party
2005–2008	48th	List	42	Labour
2008–2011	49th	List	22	Labour
2011–2014	50th	List	10	Labour
2014–2017	51st	List	10	Labour

Sue Moroney was, with Shane Jones, one of two newly elected members of parliament to move and second the Address in Reply to the Governor General's speech from the throne at the opening of the 48th Parliament.

On 31 October 2007 Moroney was announced as the new Junior Government Whip, replacing Darren Hughes who became a Minister outside Cabinet.

Sue Moroney drafted a private members bill that entitled workers to their meal and rest breaks which, along with another private members bill in the name of Labour colleague Steve Chadwick, was the basis for the 'Breaks and Infant Feeding Act' which passed in August 2008.

The Labour Party entered Opposition after the 2008 General Election and Moroney became the Opposition Spokesperson for the portfolios of Women's Affairs and Early Childhood Education.

Moroney is a member of the Transport and Industrial Relations select committee.

Moroney had a private members bill in the ballot to extend Paid Parental Leave to six months from fourteen weeks. It was defeated after the 2015 election by a 60–60 vote with the National Party government and ACT voting against the bill. She also sponsored a petition signed by 15,808 others calling on the government to reinstate pay equity reviews for school support staff and social workers, and develop a plan to end the 12% gender pay gap in New Zealand.

Moroney presented the "Waikato Trains Now!" petition signed by 11,500 people to the House of Representatives on 1 April 2010, on behalf of the Campaign for Better Transport group. The petition called for a passenger rail service from Hamilton to Auckland.

In early 2011 Labour Leader Phil Goff announced a reshuffle of his caucus. Moroney was moved to a higher rank in the party caucus and gained the responsibility for Aged Care. Women's Affairs was passed on to first term MP Carol Beaumont.

Following the resignation from parliament of Darren Hughes, Moroney was further promoted to the front bench taking on the senior portfolio of Education and passed Aged Care onto Steve Chadwick.

Following the resignation of David Shearer in 2013 and the election of David Cunliffe as party leader, Moroney was elected as Chief Whip.

Only five months after its defeat, Moroney had another private members bill drawn from the ballot to extend Paid Parental Leave to six months from 18 weeks. The bill also allocates 'work contact hours' for parents wanting to keep in contact with their workplace during their leave, to no detriment to their parental leave entitlements. the bill passed its first reading in Parliament on 16 September 2015 by 61 votes to 60, with support coming from New Zealand First, the Greens, the Maori Party and United Future. The bill is currently at committee stage.

In the November 2015 Labour Party caucus reshuffle, Moroney was promoted to the Labour Party shadow cabinet by leader Andrew Little. In her promotion, Moroney picked up the Transport portfolio and associate spokesperson on Industrial Relations and Safety.

On 30 April she announced she would not be standing in the 2017 election, saying, ""I made my decision after being notified last night that I had lost support from the party's ruling council for an electable position on the Labour Party list".

=== After parliament ===
Sue Moroney became the CEO of Community Law Centres Aotearoa in 2018, leading the provision of free legal services at 24 Community Law Centres throughout New Zealand. Moroney is running to be a Hamilton city councillor for the East ward in the 2025 local elections.

== Personal life ==
Her family is prominent in horse racing. Her brother Michael Moroney was a champion Australasian racehorse trainer and past winner of the Melbourne Cup (Brew, 2000) and another brother Paul Moroney is a prominent equine bloodstock agent.

Moroney is married with two sons.

Political offices
Preceded by Darren Hughes	Junior Government Whip; 2007–2008	Succeeded by Chris Tremain
Party political offices
Preceded by Chris Hipkins	Senior Whip of the Labour Party; 2013–2014	Succeeded by Chris Hipkins
