= Hamilton West (New Zealand electorate) =

- Single-member general constituency for the New Zealand House of Representatives
- Interactive map of boundaries from the 2026 election
- Formation: 1969
- Region: Waikato
- Character: Urban and suburban
- Term: 3 years

Member for Hamilton West
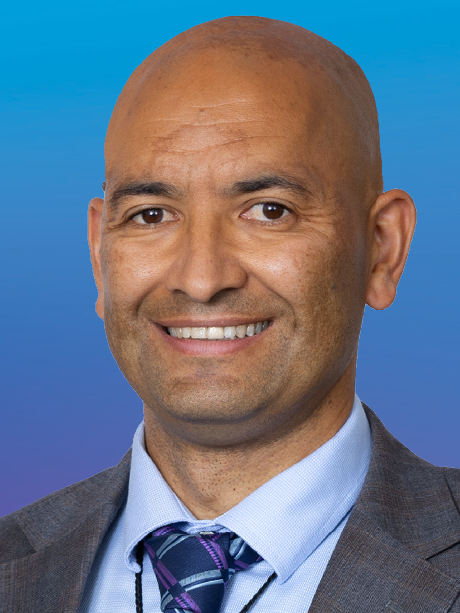
- Tama Potaka since 10 December 2022
- Party: National
- Previous MP: Gaurav Sharma (Ind)
Party vote distribution

Hamilton West is a New Zealand parliamentary electorate. It has been held by Tama Potaka MP of the National Party since the 2022 by-election.

Hamilton West is regarded as a bellwether seat. In 17 of the 18 general elections since the electorate's creation, the party that has won the plurality of seats nationally has won Hamilton West. The sole exception was in 1993, when Labour won the electorate but National won the plurality of the seats.

== Population centres ==
Map of boundaries at the 2020 and 2023 general elections

Through an amendment in the Electoral Act in 1965, the number of electorates in the South Island was fixed at 25, an increase of one since the 1962 electoral redistribution. It was accepted that through the more rapid population growth in the North Island, the number of its electorates would continue to increase, and to keep proportionality, three new electorates were allowed for in the 1967 electoral redistribution for the next election. In the North Island, five electorates were newly created (including Hamilton West) and one electorate was reconstituted while three electorates were abolished (including Hamilton). In the South Island, three electorates were newly created and one electorate was reconstituted while three electorates were abolished. The overall effect of the required changes was highly disruptive to existing electorates, with all but three electorates having their boundaries altered. These changes came into effect with the 1969 election.

The former Hamilton electorate had existed since 1922 and had covered the urban area. When it was replaced by Hamilton West for the 1969 election, only part of the urban area was included but also rural land stretching all the way to the west coast. Most of the rural land had previously been part of the Waipa electorate. The town of Raglan was the north-western point of the electorate, and was surprisingly not located in the Raglan electorate. In the south-west, the electorate stretched as far as just north of the Kāwhia Harbour.

The 1972 electoral redistribution significantly reduced the size of the Hamilton West electorate, and all the rural land mostly transferred to the Raglan electorate. The additional electorate of Hamilton East was created at the same time. These changes came into effect with the 1972 election and since then, the electorate has been mainly urban, and has covered the western part of the city of Hamilton, including the CBD, Hamilton North, Hamilton West, the suburbs of Te Rapa, Pukete, St Andrews, Beerescourt, Nawton, Grandview Heights, Western Heights, Dinsdale, Temple View, Frankton, Maeroa, Hamilton Lake, Melville, Bader, Glenview and Fitzroy.

The Waikato River divides the city in half and forms the boundary between the Hamilton East and Hamilton West electorates, except in the north where Hamilton West covers part of Flagstaff on the east bank. Hamilton West also borders the rural electorates of Waikato to the north and west, and Taranaki-King Country to the south.

The 2020 electoral redistribution saw the area north of Borman Road, including Horsham Downs, ceded to Waikato.

== History ==
The first representative of Hamilton West was Leslie Munro of the National Party, who had since the 1963 election represented the Waipa electorate. When Hamilton West became an urban electorate in 1972, Munro retired and the electorate was won by Dorothy Jelicich of the Labour Party. Jelicich was defeated after one term in the 1975 election by National's Mike Minogue.

=== Members of Parliament ===
Unless otherwise stated, all MPs terms began and started at general elections.

Key

National Labour NZ First Independent

Election	Winner
1969 election	Leslie Munro
1972 election	Dorothy Jelicich
1975 election	Mike Minogue
1978 election	Mike Minogue
1981 election	Mike Minogue
1984 election	Trevor Mallard
1987 election	Trevor Mallard
1990 election	Grant Thomas
1993 election	Martin Gallagher
1996 election	Bob Simcock
1999 election	Martin Gallagher
2002 election	Martin Gallagher
2005 election	Martin Gallagher
2008 election	Tim Macindoe
2011 election	Tim Macindoe
2014 election	Tim Macindoe
2017 election	Tim Macindoe
2020 election	Gaurav Sharma
2022 by-election	Tama Potaka
2023 election	Tama Potaka

=== List MPs ===
Members of Parliament elected from party lists in elections where that person also unsuccessfully contested the Hamilton West electorate. Unless otherwise stated, all MPs terms began and ended at general elections.

Election	Winner
1996 election	Neil Kirton
1999 election	Bob Simcock
2002 election	Bill Gudgeon
2011 election	Sue Moroney
2014 election	Sue Moroney

== Election results ==
=== 2026 election ===
The next election will be held on 7 November 2026. Candidates for Hamilton West are listed at Candidates in the 2026 New Zealand general election by electorate § Hamilton West. Official results will be available after 27 November 2026.

=== 2023 election ===
2023 general election: Hamilton West
Notes:	Blue background denotes the winner of the electorate vote. Pink background denotes a candidate elected from their party list. Yellow background denotes an electorate win by a list member, or other incumbent. A ✓ or ✗ denotes status of any incumbent, win or lose respectively.						
Party	Candidate	Votes	%	±%	Party votes	%	±%
National	✓ Tama Potaka	17,595	46.04	−0.25	16,026	41.18	+16.06
Labour	Myra Williamson	11,107	29.06		10,242	26.32	−25.94
Green	Benjamin Doyle	3,230	8.45		3,863	9.92	+4.29
ACT	Susan Stevenson	2,216	5.79		3,398	8.73	+1.86
NZ First	Kevin Stone	1,737	4.54		2,410	6.19	+3.65
Opportunities	Naomi Pocock	1,048	2.74	−0.37	967	2.48	−0.41
Animal Justice	Melanie Wilson	326	0.85		94	0.24	
Independent	Rudi du Plooy	323	0.84	+0.06			
Te Pāti Māori					711	1.82	+1.30
NZ Loyal					322	0.82	
Legalise Cannabis					169	0.43	−0.10
NewZeal					163	0.41	
Freedoms NZ					141	0.36	
New Conservatives					97	0.24	−1.80
DemocracyNZ					55	0.14	
Women's Rights					37	0.09	
New Nation					24	0.06	
Leighton Baker Party					17	0.04	
Informal votes		634			176		
Total valid votes		38,216			38,912		
National hold	Majority	6,488	16.97	+0.82			

=== 2022 by-election ===
The following table shows the final by-election results:

2022 Hamilton West by-election
Notes: Blue background denotes the winner of the by-election. Pink background denotes a candidate elected from their party list prior to the by-election. Yellow background denotes the winner of the by-election, who was a list MP prior to the by-election. A ✓ or ✗ denotes status of any incumbent, win or lose respectively.
Party	Candidate	Votes	%	±%
National	Tama Potaka	6,974	46.29	
Labour	Georgie Dansey	4,541	30.14	
ACT	James McDowall	1,515	10.06	
Momentum	Gaurav Sharma	1,242	8.24	−43.61
Opportunities	Naomi Pocock	357	2.37	
Outdoors	Donna Pokere-Phillips	130	0.86	
New Conservatives/ONE	Rudi du Plooy	118	0.78	−0.76
Legalise Cannabis	Peter Wakeman	76	0.50	
Vision NZ	Jade Tait	61	0.40	
Independent	Gordon Dickson	26	0.17	
Independent	Frank Fu	20	0.13	
Money Free	Richard Osmaston	7	0.05	
Informal votes		37	0.27	−1.96
Majority		2,433	16.15	
Turnout		15,104	31.40	−49.80
National gain from Labour		Swing	+	

=== 2020 election ===
2020 general election: Hamilton West
Notes:	Blue background denotes the winner of the electorate vote. Pink background denotes a candidate elected from their party list. Yellow background denotes an electorate win by a list member, or other incumbent. A ✓ or ✗ denotes status of any incumbent, win or lose respectively.						
Party	Candidate	Votes	%	±%	Party votes	%	±%
Labour	Gaurav Sharma	20,703	51.85	+21.09	21,136	52.26	+15.65
National	✗ Tim Macindoe	14,436	36.16	−16.00	10,161	25.12	−21.17
ACT	Roger Weldon	1,186	2.97	—	2,779	6.87	+6.47
Opportunities	Hayden Cargo	1,024	2.56	+0.32	837	2.07	−0.58
New Conservative	Rudi Du Plooy	615	1.54	—	824	2.04	+1.74
Advance NZ	Cherie Ormsby-Kingi	490	1.23	—	390	0.96	—
Outdoors	Chloe Mansfield	357	0.89	—	44	0.11	+0.03
ONE	Te Rongopai Heta	223	0.56	—	133	0.33	—
Green					2,279	5.63	+1.34
NZ First					1,029	2.54	−5.13
Legalise Cannabis					214	0.53	+0.23
Māori Party					212	0.52	−0.12
Vision New Zealand					60	0.15	—
Sustainable NZ					21	0.05	—
Social Credit					15	0.04	−0.01
TEA					9	0.02	—
Heartland					4	0.01	—
Informal votes		892			300		
Total valid votes		39,926			40,447		
Turnout		40,584	81.20	+3.18			
Labour gain from National	Majority	6,267	15.70	+37.10			

=== 2017 election ===
2017 general election: Hamilton West
Notes:	Blue background denotes the winner of the electorate vote. Pink background denotes a candidate elected from their party list. Yellow background denotes an electorate win by a list member, or other incumbent. A ✓ or ✗ denotes status of any incumbent, win or lose respectively.						
Party	Candidate	Votes	%	±%	Party votes	%	±%
National	✓ Tim Macindoe	18,842	52.16	−0.34	17,119	46.29	−1.22
Labour	Gaurav Sharma	11,111	30.76	−4.27	13,539	36.61	+11.04
Green	Jo Wrigley	2,355	6.52	—	1,588	4.29	−3.88
NZ First	Shayne Wihongi	2,133	5.90	−0.95	2,836	7.67	−3.10
Opportunities	Donna Pokere-Phillips	809	2.24	—	981	2.65	—
Māori Party	Boris Samujh	251	0.69	−0.18	232	0.64	+0.08
Independent	Roger Stratford	82	0.23	—			
United Future	Quentin Todd	61	0.19	—	35	0.09	−0.15
Independent	Vin Tomar	28	0.08	—			
ACT					149	0.40	−0.07
Conservative					111	0.30	−4.34
Legalise Cannabis					110	0.30	−0.21
Ban 1080					32	0.09	−0.02
Outdoors					28	0.08	—
People's Party					28	0.08	—
Democrats					19	0.05	−0.08
Mana Party					9	0.02	—
Internet					6	0.02	—
Informal votes		452			162		
Total valid votes		36,124			36,984		
National hold	Majority	7,731	21.40	+3.93			

=== 2014 election ===
2014 general election: Hamilton West
Notes:	Blue background denotes the winner of the electorate vote. Pink background denotes a candidate elected from their party list. Yellow background denotes an electorate win by a list member, or other incumbent. A ✓ or ✗ denotes status of any incumbent, win or lose respectively.						
Party	Candidate	Votes	%	±%	Party votes	%	±%
National	✓ Tim Macindoe	17,382	52.50	−0.76	16,072	47.51	−0.23
Labour	Sue Moroney	11,598	35.03	−4.03	8,649	25.57	−3.58
NZ First	Bill Gudgeon	2,269	6.85	+0.87	3,644	10.77	+3.05
Conservative	Tony McKenna	923	2.79	+0.40	1,571	4.64	+1.45
Māori Party	Richard Te Ao	289	0.87	+0.87	190	0.56	−0.03
Democrats	Mischele Rhodes	149	0.45	+0.21	43	0.13	+0.01
ACT	Sara Muti	126	0.38	+0.38	160	0.47	−0.44
Green					2,765	8.17	−0.67
Internet Mana					242	0.72	+0.36 (Note: 2014 Internet Mana swing is relative to the votes for Mana in 2011; it shared a party list with Internet in the 2014 election.)
Legalise Cannabis					171	0.51	−0.04
United Future					87	0.26	−0.45
Ban 1080					38	0.11	+0.11
Civilian					18	0.05	+0.05
Independent Coalition					13	0.04	+0.04
Focus					7	0.02	+0.02
Informal votes		373			159		
Total valid votes		33,109			33,829		
Turnout		33,988	75.22	+3.03			
National hold	Majority	5,784	17.47	+3.28			

=== 2011 election ===
2011 general election: Hamilton West
Notes:	Blue background denotes the winner of the electorate vote. Pink background denotes a candidate elected from their party list. Yellow background denotes an electorate win by a list member, or other incumbent. A ✓ or ✗ denotes status of any incumbent, win or lose respectively.						
Party	Candidate	Votes	%	±%	Party votes	%	±%
National	✓ Tim Macindoe	16,587	53.26	+4.47	15,300	47.74	+1.76
Labour	Sue Moroney	12,169	39.07	−4.83	9,342	29.15	−6.50
NZ First	Bill Gudgeon	1,294	4.16	+4.16	2,475	7.72	+3.44
Conservative	Pat Gregory	744	2.39	+2.39	1,022	3.19	+3.19
Independent	Robert Curtis	159	0.51	+0.51			
Independent	Tim Wikiriwhi	115	0.37	+0.37			
Democrats	Les Port	75	0.24	+0.24	38	0.12	+0.04
Green					2,834	8.84	+3.76
ACT					292	0.91	−2.83
United Future					227	0.71	−0.41
Māori Party					188	0.59	−0.48
Legalise Cannabis					175	0.55	+0.10
Mana					115	0.36	+0.36
Libertarianz					31	0.10	+0.01
Alliance					10	0.03	-0.004
Informal votes		680			286		
Total valid votes		31,143			32,049		
National hold	Majority	4,418	14.19	+9.30			

Electorate (as at 26 November 2011): 44,793

=== 2008 election ===
2008 general election: Hamilton West
Notes:	Blue background denotes the winner of the electorate vote. Pink background denotes a candidate elected from their party list. Yellow background denotes an electorate win by a list member, or other incumbent. A ✓ or ✗ denotes status of any incumbent, win or lose respectively.						
Party	Candidate	Votes	%	±%	Party votes	%	±%
National	Tim Macindoe	16,163	48.79	+5.33	15,541	45.98	+5.95
Labour	✗ Martin Gallagher	14,545	43.91	−2.01	12,048	35.64	−5.65
Green	Dale Stevens	1,389	4.19		1,719	5.09	+1.24
ACT	Ian Parker	543	1.64	+0.62	1,263	3.74	+2.13
United Future	Ken Smith	218	0.66	−0.89	378	1.12	−1.73
Independent	Suresh Vatsyayann	157	0.47	−0.02			
Libertarianz	Timothy Wikiriwhi	112	0.34	+0.19	31	0.09	+0.05
NZ First					1,449	4.29	−3.18
Māori Party					360	1.07	−0.40
Bill and Ben					264	0.78	
Kiwi					196	0.58	
Progressive					189	0.56	+0.49
Legalise Cannabis					150	0.44	−0.18
Family Party					120	0.36	
Pacific					32	0.09	
Democrats					25	0.07	±0.00
Workers Party					17	0.05	
Alliance					12	0.04	+0.01
RONZ					4	0.01	
RAM					2	0.01	
Informal votes		347			188		
Total valid votes		33,127			33,800		
Turnout		34,268	78.63	−1.59			
National gain from Labour	Majority	1,618	4.88	+7.34			

=== 2005 election ===
2005 general election: Hamilton West
Notes:	Blue background denotes the winner of the electorate vote. Pink background denotes a candidate elected from their party list. Yellow background denotes an electorate win by a list member, or other incumbent. A ✓ or ✗ denotes status of any incumbent, win or lose respectively.						
Party	Candidate	Votes	%	±%	Party votes	%	±%
Labour	✓ Martin Gallagher	15,396	45.92	−2.61	14,097	41.29	−0.33
National	Tim Macindoe	14,571	43.46	+10.01	13,664	40.03	+19.03
NZ First	Bill Gudgeon	1,847	5.51	−1.43	2,549	7.47	−4.24
United Future	Robyn Jackson	521	1.55	−1.54	974	2.85	−3.98
Māori Party	Tureiti Moxon	379	1.13		229	0.67	
ACT	Stephen Cox	342	1.02	−3.31	550	1.61	−6.51
Progressive	Sukhdev Bains	215	0.64	−0.14	358	1.05	−0.14
Independent	Suresh Vatsyayann	165	0.49				
Libertarianz	Timothy Wikiriwhi	50	0.15	−0.11	15	0.04	
RONZ	Jack Gielen	43	0.13		13	0.04	
Green					1,313	3.85	−1.87
Destiny					159	0.47	
Legalise Cannabis					89	0.26	−0.28
Christian Heritage					56	0.16	−1.19
Democrats					24	0.07	
Family Rights					14	0.04	
Direct Democracy					11	0.03	
Alliance					10	0.03	−0.77
One NZ					7	0.02	−0.03
99 MP					6	0.02	
Informal votes		300			138		
Total valid votes		33,529			34,138		
Turnout		34,489	80.22	+5.06			
Labour hold	Majority	825	2.46	−16.05			

=== 2002 election ===
2002 general election: Hamilton West
Notes:	Blue background denotes the winner of the electorate vote. Pink background denotes a candidate elected from their party list. Yellow background denotes an electorate win by a list member, or other incumbent. A ✓ or ✗ denotes status of any incumbent, win or lose respectively.						
Party	Candidate	Votes	%	±%	Party votes	%	±%
Labour	✓ Martin Gallagher	14,614	48.53		12,715	41.62	
National	Bob Simcock	9,040	30.02		6,415	21.00	
NZ First	Bill Gudgeon	2,091	6.94		3,577	11.71	
ACT	Garry Mallett	1,304	4.33		2,481	8.12	
Green	Chris Norton-Brown	1,203	3.99		1,748	5.72	
United Future	Martyn Seddon	932	3.09		2,087	6.83	
Christian Heritage	Eleanor Goodall	454	1.51		412	1.35	
Progressive	Rob Shirley	234	0.78		379	1.24	
Alliance	Craig A. Wills	164	0.54		243	0.80	
Libertarianz	Timothy Wikiriwhi	79	0.26				
ORNZ					298	0.98	
Legalise Cannabis					164	0.54	
One NZ					15	0.05	
Mana Māori					14	0.05	
NMP					4	0.01	
Informal votes		265			142		
Total valid votes		30,115			30,552		
Turnout		30,877	75.16				
Labour hold	Majority	5,574	18.51				

=== 1999 election ===
1999 general election: Hamilton West
Notes:	Blue background denotes the winner of the electorate vote. Pink background denotes a candidate elected from their party list. Yellow background denotes an electorate win by a list member, or other incumbent. A ✓ or ✗ denotes status of any incumbent, win or lose respectively.						
Party	Candidate	Votes	%	±%	Party votes	%	±%
Labour	Martin Gallagher	14,147	44.57		11,769	36.75	
National	✗ Bob Simcock	12,518	39.43		10,491	32.76	
Alliance	Dave MacPherson	1,667	5.25		2,604	8.13	
ACT	Garry Mallett	1,148	3.62		2,414	7.54	
NZ First	Athol Gould	957	3.01		1,376	4.30	
Christian Heritage	Eleanor Goodall	888	2.80		901	2.81	
Independent	Pita Cammock	248	0.78				
Mauri Pacific	Fa'amatuainu Iakopo	134	0.42		38	0.12	
Mana Wahine	Avon Johnson	37	0.12				
Green					1,366	4.27	
Christian Democrats					329	1.03	
Legalise Cannabis					298	0.93	
Libertarianz					115	0.36	
United NZ					103	0.32	
McGillicuddy Serious					76	0.24	
Animals First					60	0.19	
One NZ					41	0.13	
Natural Law					15	0.05	
Mana Māori					13	0.04	
People's Choice					6	0.02	
NMP					5	0.02	
Freedom Movement					3	0.01	
Republican					2	0.01	
South Island					1	0.00	
Informal votes		571			322		
Total valid votes		31,744			32,026		
Turnout		33,038	84.06				
Labour gain from National	Majority	1,629	5.13				

=== 1996 election ===
1996 general election: Hamilton West
Notes:	Blue background denotes the winner of the electorate vote. Pink background denotes a candidate elected from their party list. Yellow background denotes an electorate win by a list member, or other incumbent. A ✓ or ✗ denotes status of any incumbent, win or lose respectively.						
Party	Candidate	Votes	%	±%	Party votes	%	±%
National	Bob Simcock	12,696	38.73		12,584	38.23	
Labour	✗ Martin Gallagher	12,099	36.91	−1.23	8,754	26.59	
NZ First	Neil Kirton	3,861	11.78		4,459	13.55	
Alliance	John Pemberton	1,738	5.30		2,651	8.05	
Christian Coalition	Eleanor Goodall	1,043	3.18	+1.05	1,735	5.27	
ACT	Garry Mallett	725	2.21		1,674	5.09	
McGillicuddy Serious	Peter Caldwell	338	1.03	+0.07	84	0.26	
Progressive Green	Robert Henderson	208	0.63		95	0.29	
Natural Law	Mike Dunn	69	0.21		53	0.16	
Legalise Cannabis					457	1.39	
United NZ					183	0.56	
Animals First					62	0.19	
Superannuitants & Youth					37	0.11	
Mana Māori					32	0.10	
Ethnic Minority Party					17	0.05	
Green Society					17	0.05	
Libertarianz					11	0.03	
Advance New Zealand					8	0.02	
Conservatives					3	0.01	
Asia Pacific United					2	0.01	
Te Tawharau					1	0.00	
Informal votes		221			79		
Total valid votes		32,777			32,919		
National gain from Labour	Majority	597	1.82				

=== 1993 election ===
1993 general election: Hamilton West
Party	Candidate	Votes	%	±%
Labour	Martin Gallagher	7,118	38.14	
National	Grant Thomas	6,669	35.73	−13.31
Alliance	Cliff Tait	2,247	12.04	
NZ First	Doug Woolerton	2,024	10.84	
Christian Heritage	Eleanor Goodall	399	2.13	−0.22
McGillicuddy Serious	Peter Caldwell	181	0.96	−0.53
Independent	Helen Marsh	23	0.12	
Majority		449	2.40	
Turnout		18,661	82.05	−1.71
Registered electors		22,742		

=== 1990 election ===
1990 general election: Hamilton West
Party	Candidate	Votes	%	±%
National	Grant Thomas	9,048	49.04	
Labour	Trevor Mallard	7,485	40.56	−10.65
NewLabour	Les Hart	776	4.20	
Christian Heritage	Eleanor Goodall	435	2.35	
McGillicuddy Serious	Peter Caldwell	275	1.49	+0.74
Social Credit	Clement Peterson	268	1.45	
Democrats	Geoffrey David Lawn	163	0.88	
Majority		1,563	8.47	
Turnout		18,450	83.76	−4.38
Registered electors		22,025		

=== 1987 election ===
1987 general election: Hamilton West
Party	Candidate	Votes	%	±%
Labour	Trevor Mallard	9,829	51.21	+5.65
National	Doug Simes	8,594	44.78	
Democrats	Kathleen Byrne	475	2.47	
NZ Party	Barry Jones	149	0.77	
McGillicuddy Serious	Peter Caldwell	144	0.75	
Majority		1,235	6.43	+2.29
Turnout		19,191	88.14	−2.90
Registered electors		21,773		

=== 1984 election ===
1984 general election: Hamilton West
Party	Candidate	Votes	%	±%
Labour	Trevor Mallard	8,886	45.56	
National	Mike Minogue	8,083	41.44	−2.84
NZ Party	Lesley Vorstman	1,747	8.95	
Social Credit	Trevor Crosbie	758	3.88	−15.00
McGillicuddy Serious	Martin James Fisher	29	0.14	
Majority		809	4.14	
Turnout		19,503	91.31	+5.95
Registered electors		21,359		

=== 1981 election ===
1981 general election: Hamilton West
Party	Candidate	Votes	%	±%
National	Mike Minogue	8,440	44.28	+1.15
Labour	Paddy McCaffrey	6,963	36.53	
Social Credit	Trevor Crosbie	3,599	18.88	
Independent	R T Stone	56	0.29	
Majority		1,477	7.75	+2.40
Turnout		19,058	85.36	+18.57
Registered electors		22,326		

=== 1978 election ===
1978 general election: Hamilton West
Party	Candidate	Votes	%	±%
National	Mike Minogue	8,101	43.13	−5.39
Labour	Dorothy Jelicich	7,095	37.77	−1.16
Social Credit	Jim Barr	3,222	17.15	
Values	S A L Zanders	296	1.57	
Right to Life	S P Bargh	66	0.35	
Majority		1,006	5.35	−4.23
Turnout		18,780	66.79	−15.96
Registered electors		28,115		

=== 1975 election ===
1975 general election: Hamilton West
Party	Candidate	Votes	%	±%
National	Mike Minogue	10,472	48.52	
Labour	Dorothy Jelicich	8,403	38.93	−7.76
Social Credit	J C Smith	2,069	9.58	
Values	Brian Robinson	637	2.95	
Majority		2,069	9.58	
Turnout		21,581	82.75	−5.33
Registered electors		26,079		

=== 1972 election ===
1972 general election: Hamilton West
Party	Candidate	Votes	%	±%
Labour	Dorothy Jelicich	7,885	46.69	
National	Derek Heather	7,341	43.47	
Social Credit	Shirley Margaret Thompson	1,449	8.58	
New Democratic	David Armitage	124	0.73	
Independent	Judith Ngaire Wainhouse	86	0.50	
Majority		544	3.22	
Turnout		16,885	88.08	+1.77
Registered electors		19,170		

=== 1969 election ===
1969 general election: Hamilton West
Party	Candidate	Votes	%	±%
National	Leslie Munro	8,406	48.81	
Labour	Bob Reese	6,528	37.91	
Social Credit	Don Bethune	2,048	11.89	
Country Party	Laurie Stuart Day	237	1.37	
Majority		1,878	10.90	
Turnout		17,219	86.31	
Registered electors		19,950		
