= Electoral (Integrity) Amendment Acts =

Acts of Parliament in New Zealand

The Electoral (Integrity) Amendment Acts are two acts of Parliament by the New Zealand Parliament which force the expulsion of members of the New Zealand Parliament who have resigned from or been expelled from the political party for which they were elected. Two such acts have been passed: the Electoral (Integrity) Amendment Act 2001 (see § 2001), which expired in 2005, and the Electoral (Integrity) Amendment Act 2018 (see § 2018), which remains in force.

The New Zealand Parliament is elected using mixed-member proportional voting and the Electoral Act 1993 provides for the election of list members on behalf of registered political parties. Particularly in the 1990s, repeated instances of party switching led to criticisms that the proportionality of parliament as determined at a general election had been disturbed. The Electoral (Integrity) Amendment Acts were therefore attempts by the legislature to control its members' affiliations and votes in a way that conformed to the most recent election outcome. The New Zealand political parlance of "waka-jumping" has given rise to the colloquial description of the acts as the "waka-jumping laws."

The acts operate differently depending on whether the expelled member represents an electoral district or if they were elected on a party list. The expulsion of an electorate member triggers a by-election; expelled list members are simply replaced by the next available candidate from their former party's list. In either instance, the Speaker of the House must make a declaration expelling the member. To date, two such declarations have been made. Former ACT MP Donna Awatere Huata was expelled in 2004 under the 2001 Act, while former Green MP Darleen Tana was expelled in 2024 under the 2018 Act. Despite the acts being in force, other members and parties have conducted political manoeuvres to enable them to change parties or to be political independents without being expelled.

== Legislative features ==
The current law, the Electoral (Integrity) Amendment Act 2018, inserted six new clauses into the Electoral Act 1993. Section 55A states that the seat of a member of Parliament (MP) becomes vacant when they cease to be a parliamentary member of the political party for which they were elected. This is considered to have occurred in either of the following scenarios:

- The MP delivers a written notice confirming that they have resigned their parliamentary membership of the party for which they were elected, or if they wish to stand in Parliament as an independent MP or a member of another political party. This rule does not apply to MPs elected as independent members.
- The defecting MP's parliamentary party leader delivers a notice confirming their resignation or expulsion to the Speaker of the New Zealand House of Representatives. At least two-thirds of the party caucus must agree to the notice being given.

The provisions of the Electoral Act 1993 which concern vacancies apply. Electorate MPs are replaced through a by-election (section 129). List MPs are replaced by the first available member on their original party's list (section 134).

The two Electoral (Integrity) Amendment Acts feature some minor drafting differences. In addition, the 2001 Act included a sunset clause so that it would automatically expire at the 2005 general election. Such a clause was not included in the current version of the legislation.

== Electoral (Integrity) Amendment Act 2001 ==
=== Background ===
Electoral (Integrity) Amendment Act 2001

New Zealand Parliament
- Assented to: 21 December 2001

Legislative history
- Introduced by: Margaret Wilson
- Introduced: 22 December 1999
- First reading: 18 December 2001
- Second reading: 18 December 2001
- Committee stage: 18 December 2001
- Third reading: 18 December 2001
- Status: Expired

Since New Zealand adopted proportional representation ahead of its 1996 general election, party switching (or waka-jumping) had been criticised for disturbing the proportionality of parliament as determined at a general election. Previously, party dissidents had simply served as independents. However, in the 44th Parliament (from 1993 to 1996) and 45th Parliament (1996 to 1999), 22 MPs defected to other parties. The Alliance, a party which had been formed by Jim Anderton's defection from Labour to NewLabour in 1989 and had been disadvantaged by the defection of Alamein Kopu in 1997, supported tighter controls on party switching. The Labour Party was also in favour. Deputy leader Michael Cullen introduced legislation to forcibly expel party switching members in October 1997, but a 5–5 split on the electoral law committee prevented the bill from progressing further.

The two parties jointly campaigned at the 1999 election for tighter controls on party switching which were soon progressed by the new Labour–Alliance coalition government. In the 1999 Speech from the Throne, the Governor-General announced on behalf of the new government:

My government recognises that there is deep public concern with a number of aspects of the operations of our political system in recent years. In particular, my government believes that the public is not prepared to countenance any repetition of the level of defection by Members of Parliament from their parties which has occurred in the last two parliaments. Accordingly, legislation will be introduced to provide that, for this and the next parliament at least, such a practice will be outlawed. Members of Parliament will, therefore, be reminded of the obligations they have to the people of New Zealand when they seek and gain election under the banner of a political party. —Michael Hardie Boys, Speech from the Throne (1999)

=== Legislative history ===
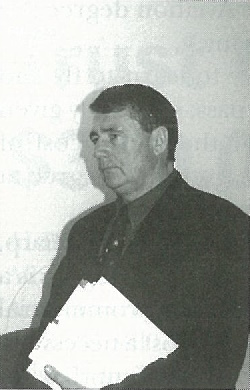
Deputy prime minister Jim Anderton was a leading figure in the development of the Electoral (Integrity) Amendment Act 2001.

The described legislation—the Electoral (Integrity) Amendment Bill—was introduced by associate justice minister Margaret Wilson the next day, 22 December 1999, and sent to the justice and electoral committee in a 64–55 vote. One Labour member was absent. It was the first bill debated in the new parliament and her speech on the bill was Wilson's first given as a newly elected MP. Labour, Alliance, New Zealand First, and United members were in support, while National, ACT, and Green members were opposed. Speaking against the bill, National MP Simon Upton acknowledged the bill's attempt to give greater weight to parliamentary proportionality over other considerations but stated: "that is, of course, not an absolute principle. The 5 percent threshold, for one, and the prospect of a by-election, for another, mean that proportionality is compromised... We have to weigh [proportionality] up against some other principles [such as] the importance of allowing political parties to evolve and allowing electoral systems to evolve [and] the freedom of speech and conscience." Anderton, now deputy prime minister, addressed dissonance between his departure from Labour while remaining in parliament and his support for legislation that triggered compulsory expulsions, saying his was "a decision made in a totally different constitutional environment" to Kopu's.

The "teeth" of the bill and its ability to actually expel dissident MPs was debated. Political journalist John Armstrong noted that because, under the proposal at the time, members must write to the Speaker giving notice of their resignation from their parties that members like Kopu could avoid expulsion simply by refusing to do that. Legal advice from the solicitor-general John McGrath said trying to strengthen the bill to secure non-voluntary resignations might cause it to no longer be consistent with the New Zealand Bill of Rights Act 1990. The government worked with New Zealand First, which had also been subject to many defections in the previous parliament, to address these shortcomings and secure that party's ongoing support. The outcome was that party leaders would be able to write to the Speaker with the support of two-thirds of the party's caucus, forcing the expulsion of a member.

The bill began its second reading on 9 November 2000, before the deal with New Zealand First had been completed, when National whip Gerry Brownlee won the consent of Parliament to have it promoted up the order paper. The second reading was completed under urgency on 20 December 2001 (officially recorded as 18 December in Hansard); the committee stage (wherein the amendment negotiated with New Zealand First was officially agreed) and third reading were held immediately afterwards. Speaking in the debate, Green co-leader Rod Donald addressed New Zealand First leader Winston Peters' apparent change of heart by quoting one of Peters' old press releases: in 1996 he had said "Members of Parliament joining New Zealand First or any other political party without resigning and seeking a new mandate is consistent with constitutional precedent. MPs have to be free to follow their conscience. They were elected to represent their constituents, not swear an oath of blind allegiance to a political party."

The final vote was 64–54. Two ACT members were absent and the sole United member Peter Dunne withdrew his earlier support.

=== Implementation ===
The Electoral (Integrity) Amendment Act 2001 came into force on 22 December 2001, the second anniversary of its introduction and the day after it received the Royal assent. Despite the strengthening of the bill in the committee stage, almost immediately MPs found ways to work around its provisions. The Alliance fractured in 2002 over New Zealand's involvement in the War in Afghanistan and Anderton formed a new party, the Progressive Party. To avoid triggering the legislation he had endorsed, Anderton nominally remained leader of the Alliance within parliament even while campaigning as the leader of the Progressives; he struck a deal with Laila Harré, who led Alliance members who did not follow him, wherein she would not "publicly lay claim" to the Alliance leadership. National leader Bill English called the arrangement deceitful; Anderton denied accusations of waka-jumping because he still supported the government. Prime minister Helen Clark responded by calling an early election.

In the subsequent term, Labour MP Tariana Turia resigned from her party and the parliament in 2004, forcing a by-election where she was re-elected as a candidate of the Māori Party. ACT attempted to expel list MP Donna Awatere Huata in 2003; after a 10-month legal battle the Supreme Court declared in 2004 Awatere Huata had "distorted, and is likely to continue to distort, the proportionality of political party representation in Parliament as determined at the last general election" and permitted her expulsion to proceed. It was reported that National threatened Maurice Williamson with the Act in 2002 and 2003, but it was conceded that this was unlikely in practice.

=== Expiration and attempted reinstatement ===
The Act expired at the 2005 New Zealand general election as its sunset clause came into effect. The reintroduction of the Act was part of the confidence and supply agreement formed between Labour and New Zealand First after that election. A replacement Electoral (Integrity) Amendment Bill was moved on behalf of the deputy prime minister Michael Cullen on 6 December 2005; it was sent to the justice and electoral committee in a 61–60 vote. Labour, New Zealand First, United Future and the Progressives were in favour; National, the Green Party, the Māori Party and ACT were opposed. The new bill was proposed without an expiry date.

A legal opinion from solicitor-general Terence Arnold reviewed the bill's compliance with the New Zealand Bill of Rights Act 1990 (BORA). Arnold's view was that the bill made prima facie infringements on the rights of members of Parliament to freedom of expression and freedom of association. However, he stated that arguments made by the Supreme Court the previous year meant although "it can be argued that the Bill should protect 'legitimate dissent' by members in respect of their parties and, to the extent that it does not, it is BORA inconsistent, on the basis of Awatere Huata, the better view is that the Bill is consistent with, and does not breach, BORA." After select committee consideration of the bill, United Future removed its support for the bill and the attempt to reinstate the Act failed.

While no electoral integrity laws were in place, party switching resumed, but less frequently than the pre-1999 period. List MP Gordon Copeland, who had been party of the government-supporting United Future sat as an independent from 2007 and began supporting the opposition National Party. Te Tai Tokerau MP Hone Harawira resigned from the Māori Party and Parliament in 2011, forcing and winning a by-election under the new Mana Movement. There were also three expulsions: Taito Phillip Field (2007) and Chris Carter (2010) were expelled from Labour and Brendan Horan (2012) from New Zealand First. All of the expelled MPs remained in Parliament until the end, or near-end in Carter's case, of their terms in Parliament; Field and Horan unsuccessfully sought re-election.

Public opinion appeared to be in favour of reintroducing electoral integrity laws, at least for list MPs. A 2013 public opinion poll found, that 76% of New Zealanders opposed list MPs staying in Parliament if they leave their party.

== Electoral (Integrity) Amendment 2018 ==
Electoral (Integrity) Amendment Act 2018

New Zealand Parliament
- Assented to: 3 October 2018

Legislative history
- Introduced by: Andrew Little
- First reading: 30 January 2018
- Second reading: 2 August 2018
- Third reading: 27 September 2018
- Status: Current legislation

=== Background ===
The Labour–New Zealand First coalition government agreed "to introduce and pass a 'waka-jumping' bill" as one of New Zealand First's priorities. Justice minister Andrew Little was responsible for the new legislation and brought papers to Cabinet in 2017 seeking agreement on the policy for the bill and, soon after, for its introduction. The bill proposed was functionally the same as the 2001 Act, but like the 2005 bill did not include a sunset clause. Little noted that the lack of an expiry date for the law would make it "an enduring feature of New Zealand's electoral law" and also said this is one reason the bill was likely to be contentious. Attorney-general David Parker's legal opinion on the new bill's Bill of Rights consistency concluded "that while [the bill] clearly limits the rights guaranteed by [sections] 14 (freedom of expression) and 17 (freedom of association) [of the New Zealand Bill of Rights Act 1990] those limitations are justified in a free and democratic society."

The Green Party, which was a confidence-and-supply partner to the government but did not have any ministers in the Cabinet, had opposed all of the electoral integrity bills in previous parliaments but was bound by its own agreement to the Labour Party to "act in good faith to allow [the Labour–New Zealand First coalition agreement] to be complied with." A party spokesperson said the team negotiating the agreement with Labour "forgot" to register the Greens' opposition to waka-jumping legislation because New Zealand First had not explicitly campaigned on it at the election. With National and ACT, the only other parties in parliament, opposed to the bill, the government relied on Green votes for the legislation to proceed. Their support came reluctantly. Senior Green MP Eugenie Sage would later say: "The stability of the Government is really important and in a coalition there are negotiations ... This is important to one coalition partner. This is a dead rat that we have to swallow." The bill was officially introduced into Parliament on 12 December 2017.

=== Legislative history ===
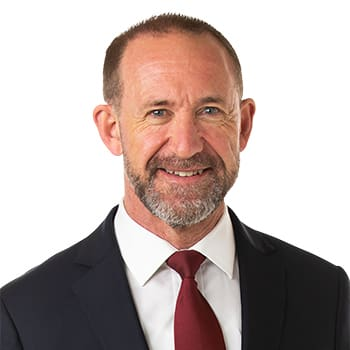
The Bill's sponsor Andrew Little

On 30 January 2018, Little moved the first reading of the Electoral (Integrity) Amendment Bill. That day was, coincidentally, the date of a special debate acknowledging the death of the former deputy prime minister and electoral integrity champion Jim Anderton, whose past contribution to the issue was noted by the current deputy prime minister and New Zealand First leader Winston Peters.

During the first reading, several National Party MPs including Amy Adams, Judith Collins, and Nick Smith opposed the bill, claiming that it would favor party apparatchiks over MPs' electorates and stifle democracy. The bill was defended by several government MPs including Labour MP Clare Curran, New Zealand First MP Darroch Ball and Green MP Golriz Ghahraman, who argued that it would preserve democracy by preventing party switching and upholding the proportionality of Parliament determined by electors. Ghahraman claimed the Greens had won policy concessions (a notice period for MPs subject to the section of the Act that enabled their expulsion from a political party) that enabled them to support the bill, but the party faced criticism for its change of heart. The Bill passed its first reading along party lines with 63 in favour (Labour, New Zealand First, and the Greens) and 57 opposed (National and ACT). The bill was then referred to the justice select committee.

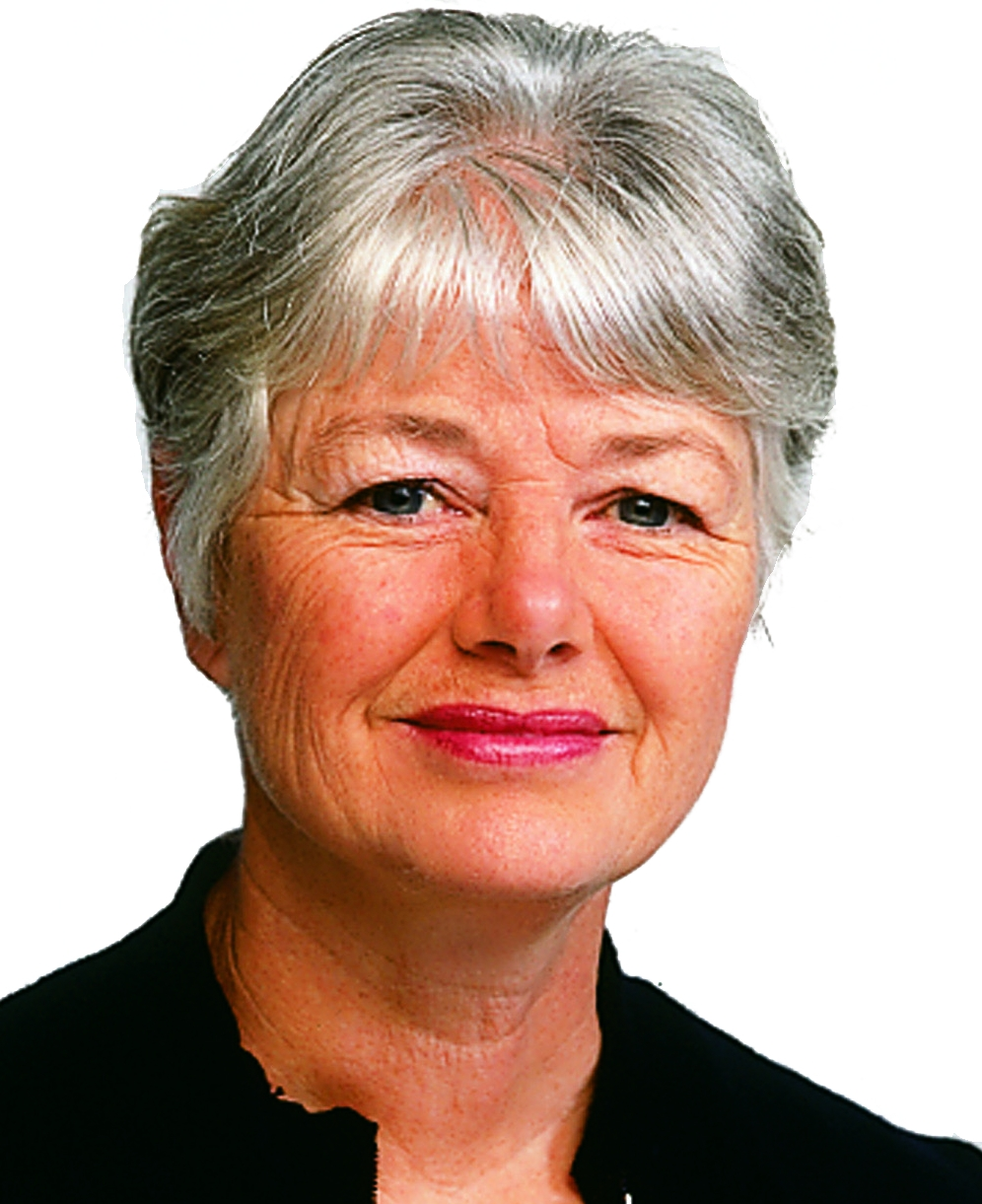
Former Green co-leader Jeanette Fitzsimons opposed the Electoral (Integrity) Amendment Act 2018

The justice committee received 55 submissions by early July 2018. Nine submitters supported the bill's intentions but thought it should be limited to list MPs. Another submitter supported the Bill but recommended amendments. Six submitters—the Clerk of the House David Wilson, Benjamin Molineux, the Legislation Design and Advisory Committee, Professor Jack Vowles, Alec van Helsdingen, and Philip Evans—suggested amendments to the legislation.

The remaining 40 submitters—including former National MP Lockwood Smith, blogger David Farrar, former Green MP Keith Locke, Annette Hamblett, activist Maire Leadbeater, and the National Party—opposed the Bill on the grounds that it constricted the freedom of MPs to dissent from their parties and the executive. The New Zealand Human Rights Commission and the New Zealand Law Society expressed concerns that the Bill clashed with the New Zealand Bill of Rights Act 1990's provisions on free speech and association. Former Green co-leader Jeanette Fitzsimons expressed opposition to the Bill, stating that it "offends the freedom of conscience, freedom of speech, and freedom of association. Integrity cannot be legislated for. It is a matter of conscience and judgment." Nineteen professors of constitutional and electoral law, including Elizabeth McLeay and Claudia Geiringer, collectively submitted that the bill is legislation in search of a problem.

Ultimately the committee was evenly divided between government and non-government members and could not agree on any amendments to the bill, returning it to the House unchanged for its second reading. The bill passed its second reading on 2 August 2018 by the same margin of 63–57 as the first reading. It was then submitted before a Committee of the whole House on 26 September 2018. National MPs put forward at least 34 amendments to the bill as part of a filibuster; all were either defeated or ruled out. The bill passed its third and final reading on 27 September 2018 in another 63–57 vote.

Little, the bill's sponsor, welcomed the passage of the bill, arguing that only voters should determine the parties represented in Parliament. National's Nick Smith vowed to repeal the law if National was elected into government and attacked New Zealand First leader Winston Peters as "master-puppeteer making fools of us and a joke of this Parliament". Peters countered that MPs disagreeing with their caucus should resign and "put it on the line in a by-election." Meanwhile, Green Party leader James Shaw described the Bill as the "most difficult decision" that the party had taken over the past year but accepted it as part of their confidence-and-supply agreement with Labour.

=== Repeal attempt ===
National MP David Carter submitted a member's bill called the Electoral (Integrity Repeal) Amendment Bill into Parliament, seeking to repeal the Electoral (Integrity) Amendment Act 2018. The Bill was selected for introduction in July 2020 and passed its first reading by 64 to 55 votes; with National, the Greens, ACT, and independent MP Jami-Lee Ross voting in favor and Labour and New Zealand First voting against. The Green Party's decision to defy other government parties and support the repeal bill infuriated deputy prime minister Winston Peters, who denounced the Greens as "untrustworthy" coalition partners. Green electoral spokesperson Chlöe Swarbrick defended her party's decision, stating that since the Greens had voted in favour of the bill the first time, they were free to revert to their long-standing position of opposing "waka jumping" laws.

The bill was sent to the justice committee, which reported back after the 2020 New Zealand general election which eliminated New Zealand First from Parliament and enabled Labour to govern alone. The committee received 19 submissions on the bill, ten in support and three opposed. Labour members on the committee outnumbered other parties and recommended it did not proceed to any further stages. The bill, now sponsored by Nick Smith, was voted down at its second reading 65 (Labour) to 55 (National, Green, ACT, and Te Pāti Māori). That debate was held over two days on 12 May and 9 June 2021.

=== Implementation ===
The Electoral (Integrity) Amendment Act 2018 came into force on 4 October 2018, the day after the day it received the Royal assent.

Between 2018 and 2023, four members left their former political parties and sat as independents without the Act's provisions being applied. Jami-Lee Ross quit National in 2018 to sit as an independent. On principle, because of his party's recent opposition to the bill, National leader Simon Bridges declined to write to the Speaker to initiate Ross's expulsion. National declined to exercise a proxy vote on behalf of Ross; New Zealand First accepted this instead and cast it in line with the votes of the National Party "to maintain 'the democratic right of expression'" and to ensure that Ross was not acting "in a way that has distorted, and is likely to continue to distort, the proportionality of political party representation in Parliament as determined at the last general election," as required by the Act. A public opinion poll found that 44% of New Zealanders supported Ross being removed from Parliament, 24% were opposed and 31% did not know.

Guarav Sharma was expelled from Labour for misconduct in August 2022. He sat as an independent for two months and resigned from Parliament that October, saying he feared that Labour would invoke the Electoral (Integrity) Amendment Act against him. Labour leader Jacinda Ardern and president Claire Szabó said they had no intention of using the Act. Former politician Peter Dunne, who had jumped from the Labour waka in the 1990s, commented that "so long as Sharma votes with the Labour Party, or at least does not vote against it, it will therefore be difficult for Labour to invoke the provisions of the waka-jumping legislation." National won the ensuing by-election; Sharma finished fourth.

In May 2023, Meka Whaitiri (Labour) and Elizabeth Kerekere (Green) quit their parties. Like National, the Green Party also declined to invoke the Electoral (Integrity) Amendment Act 2018. In the case of Whaitiri, who announced she would join Te Pāti Māori for the upcoming election, Parliament's Speaker Adrian Rurawhe said that the "very specific events" required to trigger the law had not occurred but he recognised Whaitiri as an independent for parliamentary purposes. He declined to release correspondence between himself and Whaitiri on the matter. Law professor Andrew Geddis described this apparent loophole as likely Whaitiri advising she had removed her proxy vote from Labour and requested to sit apart from them, rather than officially changing parties.

The first expulsion under the 2018 Act occurred on 22 October 2024. Following a request by the Green Party, House Speaker Gerry Brownlee expelled independent MP Darleen Tana from parliament. Tana had previously been a member of the Green Party until her resignation on 8 July 2024, which followed an internal party investigation into misconduct in her business practices. Despite the Green Party's previous opposition to the legislation's expulsion provisions, the party convened a special general meeting of 185 party delegates to consider Tana's expulsion, which reached a consensus to proceed with invoking the legislation.
