= John Wright (New Zealand politician) =

New Zealand politician (born 1945)

8th Leader of the Democratic Party
- In office 22 April 1991 – 24 November 2001
- Preceded by: Gary Knapp
- Succeeded by: Grant Gillon

Member of the New Zealand Parliament for Alliance list
- In office 12 October 1996 – 27 July 2002

Personal details
- Born: 1945 (age 80–81) Ashburton, New Zealand
- Party: Social Credit (1977–1985); Democrats (1985–2002)
- Other political affiliations: Progressive

John Wright (born 1945) is a former New Zealand politician. He was a member of parliament from 1996 to 2002, representing the Alliance. Before entering Parliament he owned the Port-a-Loo company.

== Biography ==
=== Early life and career ===
Wright was born in Ashburton in 1945. He grew up on a farm in Ashburton before becoming a panel beater and mechanic by trade. He later formed his own recycling and promotions business. He was then a sales and marketing manager for a plastics manufacturer.

He was a founding member and president of the Waimakariri Ratepayers and Residents Association. He was also a committee member of the North Christchurch Jaycees and Richmond Primary School Parent–teacher association.

=== Political career ===
New Zealand Parliament
Years	Term	Electorate	List	Party
1996–1999	45th	List	4	Alliance
1999–2002	46th	List	4	Alliance

Wright joined the Social Credit Party in 1977 and was a vice-president of the party from 1979 until 1986. He was part of the conference in 1985 that turned Social Credit into the Democratic Party. He was the Democratic candidate for Rangiora in the 1990 election. In 1991, he became leader of the Democrats.

When the Democrats joined with three other parties to found the Alliance, Wright was active in building up the new organisation. He stood unsuccessfully for the Alliance in the Rangiora seat in the 1993 election, and then in the 1994 Selwyn by-election. In the 1996 election, the first conducted under the MMP system, Wright was elected to Parliament as a list MP, having been ranked in fourth place on the Alliance list. By this time, he was leader of the Democrats. He returned to Parliament in the 1999 election, and when the Alliance formed a coalition government with the larger Labour Party, Wright was appointed to a Parliamentary Undersecretary's role in the Economic Development, Revenue, Regional Development and Racing portfolios. He became the first (and only) Social Creditor to be part of the Executive.

In 2002, the Alliance began to collapse, with a rift opening between Parliamentary leader Jim Anderton and the organisational wing, led by Matt McCarten. When Anderton left the Alliance to establish a new party, the Progressive Coalition, the Democrats (including Wright) followed him. In the 2002 election, Wright was ranked in fourth place on the Progressive list, behind Anderton, Matt Robson, and new Democratic Party leader Grant Gillon. but as the party only won enough votes for two seats, Wright did not remain in Parliament.

Later, when the Democrats opted to split from the Progressives, Wright opposed the decision. He eventually opted to leave the Democrats in order to remain with the Progressives, and was joined by Gillon. He remained a member of the Progressives until the movement's dissolution in January 2012. After he failed to retain his seat at the 2002 and 2005 elections, Wright was forced to take on a job at a panel beater's shop until he was appointed a Member of the Transit board in 2005. During this time Wright had commented to Tracy Watkins, a Fairfax Media Reporter that although he had a cabinet full of $1000 suits the only clothes he actually needed were a $12 pair of Warehouse overalls. As of 2015, Wright no longer sits on the merged NZ Transport Agency Board and his current activities are unknown.

== Notes ==
Party political offices
Preceded by Gary Knapp	Leader of the Social Credit Party; 1991–2001	Succeeded by Grant Gillon
