= Liz Gordon (politician) =

New Zealand politician

Member of the New Zealand Parliament for Alliance list
- In office 1996–2002

Personal details
- Born: 8 September 1955 (age 71) Preston, Lancashire, England
- Party: Labour Party (1982–89); NewLabour Party, Alliance
- Scientific career
- Education: Massey University
- Thesis: Access: the limits and capacity of the state (1989)
- Doctoral advisor: Richard Harker

Elizabeth Audrey Gordon (born 8 September 1955) is a former New Zealand politician. She was an MP from 1996 to 2002, representing the Alliance.

== Early life ==
Elizabeth Audrey Gordon (known as Liz) was born in Preston, England, on 8 September 1955, but brought up in the south of England from the age of one. Her parents split up when she was seven, and she and her sister, Christine, spent a number of years at King Edward's School, Witley, Surrey, as boarding pupils. Gordon left school at 15 and moved to London, where she worked for a year and met her first husband, a New Zealander. She moved to New Zealand in September 1972, still aged 16. She married in 1974 and had her daughter, Sonya, in 1976.

== Tertiary education ==
=== Tertiary study ===
Before and after the birth of her daughter, Gordon became increasingly housebound with severe agoraphobia. It was suggested to her that she go to university to resume her education. She enrolled as an adult student in 1979 at Massey University in Palmerston North. She did a BA in psychology and education, earning a Massey scholarship in 1982, completed a Master of Arts with first class honours in 1983, and a PhD in Education in 1989.

=== Lectureship ===
In 1990 she took up a lectureship at the University of Canterbury. She has held a number of honours and awards, including a doctoral scholarship, a Fulbright Travel Award, a Claude McCarthy fellowship and a Fellowship to the Institute of Education, University of London.

=== Law qualification ===
After leaving Parliament, Gordon attended the University of Canterbury as an adult student, graduating with a law degree in 2007. She was admitted to the bar in November 2008. She then went on to study further in Māori language and culture and computer studies.

== Political career ==
=== Member of Parliament ===
New Zealand Parliament
Years	Term	Electorate	List	Party
1996–1999	45th	List	13	Alliance
1999–2002	46th	List	8	Alliance

Gordon was originally a member of the Labour Party, having joined in 1982. She served on its executive in 1988, but resigned from the party in April 1989 to become a founding member of the NewLabour Party. She was first elected to Parliament as a list MP for the Alliance, of which NewLabour was a component party, in the 1996 election, coming third in Christchurch Central, and was re-elected in the 1999 election, again placing third in Christchurch Central. When the Alliance collapsed, Gordon sided with the faction led by Laila Harré and Matt McCarten, and remained with the Alliance when Jim Anderton left to form a breakaway party. In the 2002 election, she was ranked fourth on the party list, but the Alliance did not win any seats.

=== Mayoral candidate ===
In April 2010, Gordon announced that she would contest the mayoral contest for Christchurch City Council in the October 2010 election. Gordon stepped back from the mayoralty race in August 2010 and chose instead to run for one of the Riccarton-Wigram Ward seats on the council. After the election results were announced she was found not to have secured a Council seat, the winners being from the Christchurch 2021 group and Independent Citizens respectively. and was ranked several places below the qualifying number. She has since returned to her previous work as listed below.

== Life after Parliament ==
Since leaving Parliament, Gordon run a small research and evaluation agency called Network Research Associates, which has since been renamed Pukeko Research. She spent four years on the Massey University Council, including a period as Pro-Chancellor, is an active member (and National President, since 2009) of the Quality Public Education Coalition, a Council member of the Howard League for Penal Reform (since 2005) and is active in local body affairs. She wrote a weekly opinion column for the Christchurch Press between 2006 and 2008. As of 2015 Gordon sits as a council member of the Royal Society of New Zealand, in this she has undertaken the role of constituent organisational representative.
