= Victor Billot =

New Zealand writer

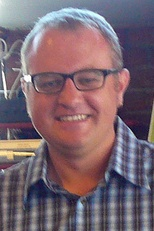
- Billot in 2008

Leader of the Alliance
- Incumbent
- Assumed office 14 February 2026
- Preceded by: Position vacant
- In office 21 October 2007 – 31 March 2008 Serving with Kay Murray
- Preceded by: Paul Piesse & Len Richards
- Succeeded by: Andrew McKenzie

President of the Alliance
- In office 2025 – 14 February 2026
- Preceded by: Position vacant
- Succeeded by: Tom Roud
- In office November 2006 – 21 October 2007
- Preceded by: Jill Ovens
- Succeeded by: Paul Piesse

Personal details
- Born: 1972 (age 53–54) Dunedin, New Zealand
- Party: Alliance (1991–present); NewLabour (1989–2000)
- Profession: Trade unionist

Victor Philip Billot (/ˈvɪktər biˈloʊ/ bee-LOH; born 1972) is a New Zealand writer, unionist and politician. He is the leader of the Alliance party.

== Early life ==
Billot was born in 1972 in Dunedin and was raised in Warrington. He attended the University of Otago, graduating with a Bachelor of Arts in political science in 1994. He was co-editor of the Otago University Students' Association magazine Critic Te Ārohi in 1995, and a performer in the bands Alpha Plan, Age of Dog and Das Phaedrus.

== NewLabour and the Alliance Party ==
Billot was a founding member of the NewLabour Party, which was set up in 1989 by Jim Anderton. In 1991, NewLabour was one of four parties to form the Alliance political party.

He was a candidate for the Alliance in 2005 (ranked 8 on the party list), 2008 (3), and 2011 (6), contesting the Dunedin North electorate each time. In 2008, he was berated by the Prime Minister, Helen Clark, at a University of Otago campaign stop for the perceived faults of the National Party when she mistook him for a supporter of that party.

At the party's 2006 conference, held in Wellington, no co-leaders were elected. Instead the party decided to concentrate on internal reorganisation; Billot was elected president. At the 2007 national conference, held in Dunedin, two co-leaders were elected, Billot and Kay Murray, with Paul Piesse returning to his former role as party president. Billot was co-leader for less than one year, stepping down from the role, effective at the end of March 2008, due to family commitments.

In 2011 it was reported Dunedin South MP Clare Curran had repeatedly invited Billot to join the New Zealand Labour Party.

He stepped down from his role as spokesman and occasional co-leader of the Alliance Party in March 2014. He continued to engage in left wing activism in Dunedin, campaigning against cuts to postal services in 2015.

After a period as the party president, Billot was re-elected Alliance Party leader in February 2026. He contested the Dunedin electorate at the 2026 general election. In June 2026, the Maritime Union of New Zealand national council unanimously voted to affiliate to the Alliance under Billot's leadership. He called it a "gamechanger" for that year's election and beyond for "advancing an uncompromising working class voice in New Zealand politics".

During the 2026 general election, Billot came eighth place in the Dunedin electorate race; gaining 191 votes based on preliminary results. The Alliance Party only gained 0.04% of the popular vote, well below the 5 percent threshold needed to enter Parliament.

== Professional life ==
Billot was the national communications officer for the Maritime Union of New Zealand (MUNZ) between 2003 and 2016. In January 2017 he began working as publicist for the Otago University Press. By January 2022 Billot had returned to his previous role at MUNZ.

From 2020 to 2025 he wrote a weekly poetry column for Newsroom.

== Publications ==
Billot has published four poetry collections:

- 2014: Mad Skillz For The Demon Operators
- 2015: Machine Language
- 2017: Ambient Terror
- 2021: The Sets

His work has also appeared in Australian and New Zealand literary journals including Cordite, Meniscus, Minarets and Takahē.

== Recordings ==
Billot has recorded several albums since the early 1990s with music groups in addition to a solo album, including:

- 1996: City of Bastards by Alpha Plan
- 2002: Plutocracy by Victor Billot
- 2016: Machine Language by Alpha Plan
