= Paul Piesse =

New Zealand politician

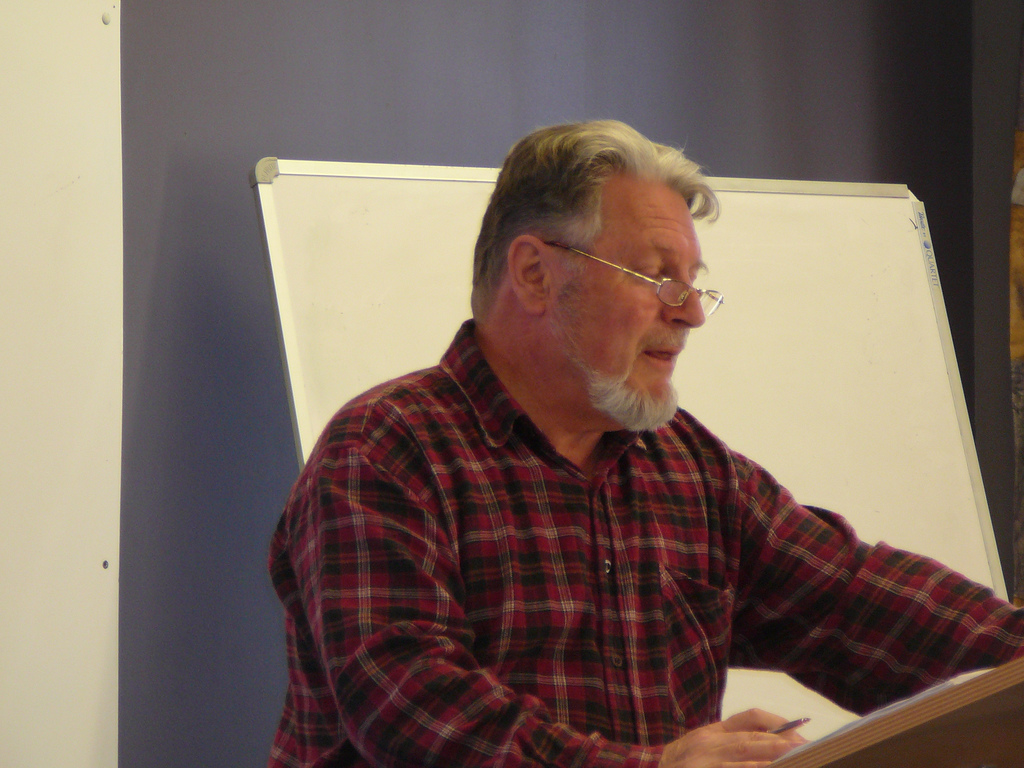
- Piesse at the 2007 Alliance party conference

Co-leader of the Alliance
- In office April 2005 – c. November 2006 Serving with Jill Ovens (2005); Len Richards (2005–2006)
- Preceded by: Matt McCarten (as sole leader)
- Succeeded by: Victor Billot & Kay Murray

President of the Alliance
- In office 21 October 2007 – c. November 2011
- Preceded by: Victor Billot
- Succeeded by: Tom Dowie

Paul Egerton Piesse is a former co-leader of the Alliance, a New Zealand political party, and union activist.

== Biography ==
Piesse has been heavily involved in the union movement, and has held a number of senior organisational roles. He was originally a supporter of the Labour Party, and in 1969 stood for Labour in the Rangiora electorate, coming second.

In the lead up to the 1984 election Piesse controversially challenged Mary Batchelor for the Labour nomination in the Avon electorate. The contest went to a second vote before Batchelor eventually emerged victorious.

He joined NewLabour in protest at the economic policies Labour pursued ("Rogernomics") in the late 1980s. NewLabour eventually helped form the Alliance, and Piesse became involved in the new party. In the 1999 election, he stood as the Alliance candidate in the Christchurch East electorate, winning 6.7% of the vote. He was ranked 58th on the Alliance list.

Following the splintering of the Alliance, Piesse sided with the Harré-McCarten faction. In the 2002 election, he stood again as an Alliance candidate, gaining 0.5% of the vote in Waimakariri. He was not on the party list. After Harré and McCarten also left the Alliance, Piesse was elected co-leader, alongside Jill Ovens, in April 2005. In the 2005 election he also stood for the Alliance. Piesse ceased being co-leader sometime around November 2006.

Piesse was elected President of the Alliance Party at the 2007 national conference held in Dunedin. In the 2008 election, he contested the Christchurch East electorate and was number 4 on the Alliance Party list. He fared poorly, coming eighth with only 119 votes. The Alliance also did poorly, winning only 0.08% of the party vote nationwide. In the 2011 election, he also stood for the Alliance.

The Alliance deregistered at its own request in May 2015. It is not known when Piesse ceased being president of the party, being last noted in the role in November 2011.

As of 2015, Piesse has been a sitting member of the executive committee of Converge, a left-wing online community network as well as being an active participant in Hobgoblin, a similar enterprise.
