= Chris Trotter =

New Zealand political commentator

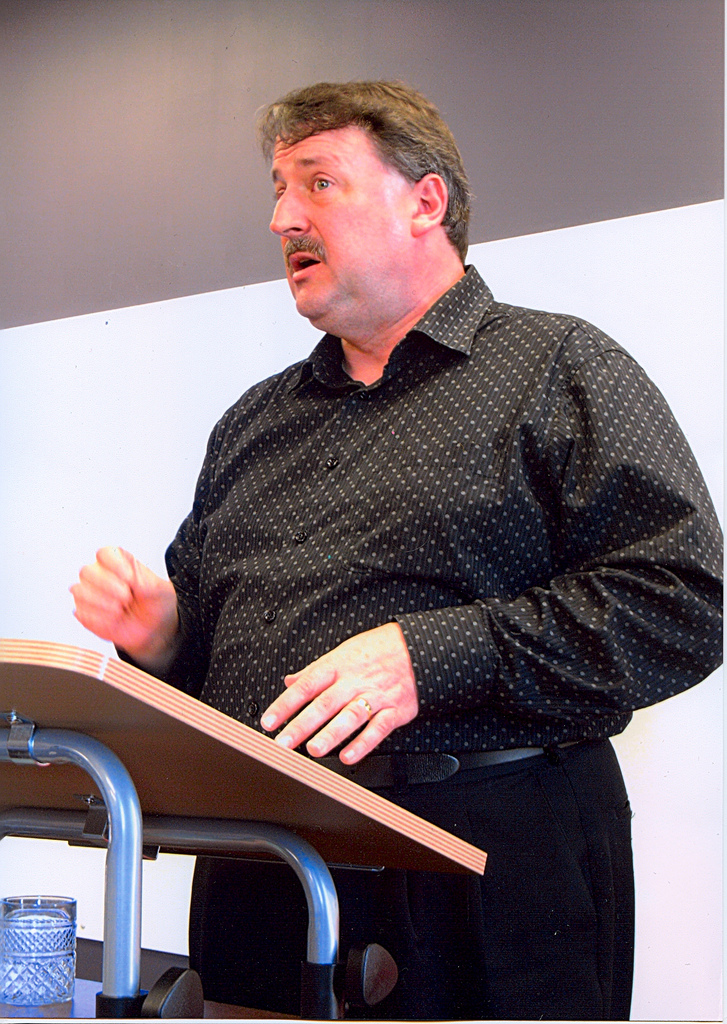
Chris Trotter speaking at the Alliance party conference in 2007

Christopher Marshall Trotter (born 1956) is a political commentator in New Zealand. He is the editor of the occasional Political Review magazine.

== Biography ==
Chris Trotter has worked for unions and was on the New Zealand Council (the national council) of the Labour Party. He has contributed to the Independent Financial Review. He makes semi-frequent television appearances as a political commentator.

Trotter was a member of the Labour Party, but when Labour MP Jim Anderton quit the party, Trotter followed him into the NewLabour Party (NLP). He stood for the party in the Dunedin North electorate and was NLP spokesperson for electoral reform and state services.

Trotter is the author of No Left Turn, a political history of New Zealand. Novelist, poet and critic C K Stead described the book as "a dashingly written and persuasive elegy for the Scandinavian-style socialist democracy New Zealand might have been, and at the same time a realistic (though at times appropriately angry) acknowledgement that, given the forces, internal and external, ranged against it, the chances of it happening, and lasting, were never very good."

In February 2008, he said that Labour leader and prime minister Helen Clark should stand down before that year's general election and be replaced by Phil Goff, who he thought may have been Labour's only hope of regaining ground with struggling families. He later recanted, arguing that Goff, who became leader after the 2008 election, should have stood down in his turn before the 2011 New Zealand general election, arguing that David Cunliffe should replace him.

In July 2018, Trotter joined the Free Speech Coalition, a group of former politicians, lawyers, journalists, and academics that pursued legal action against the Mayor of Auckland and former Labour leader Phil Goff for denying Auckland Council facilities to two Canadian alt-right activists Lauren Southern and Stefan Molyneux. Trotter justified his defense of the two alt-right activists' free speech by arguing that left-wing opponents of the tour lacked the courage to debate the alt-right. By 2021, Trotter was involved with the Coalition, which had relaunched itself as the Free Speech Union. The organisation is led by former National Party adviser Jonathan Ayling and claims to be a bipartisan organisation with both right and left-wing members.

In late March 2023, Trotter criticised the conduct of counter-demonstrators protesting against controversial feminist and anti-transgender activist Kellie-Jay Keen-Minshull, who attempted to speak in Auckland's Albert Park, describing their aggressive behaviour as a thug's veto against free speech. He also criticised the Labour and Green parties and elements of the media including TVNZ's Jack Tame for allegedly inflaming opposition against Keen-Minshull, and criticised the Police for their perceived inaction in maintaining peace between Keen-Minshull's supporters and the counter-demonstrators.
