= Jill Ovens =

New Zealand politician

- Ovens in 2006

Co-leader of the Women's Rights Party
- Incumbent
- Assumed office April 2023 Serving with Dawn Trenberth (2023); Tania Sturt (2023); Chimene del La Varis (2023); Dawn Trenberth (c. 2025–present)

Co-leader of the Alliance
- In office April 2005 – December 2005 Serving with Paul Piesse
- Preceded by: Matt McCarten (as sole leader)
- Succeeded by: Len Richards

President of the Alliance
- In office November 2004 – c. 2006
- Preceded by: Laila Harré
- Succeeded by: Victor Billot
- In office 2003 – c. July 2004
- Preceded by: Matt McCarten
- Succeeded by: Laila Harré

Personal details
- Born: Jill Annette Ovens
- Party: Alliance (1999–2006); Labour (2006–2023); Women's Rights Party (2023–present)
- Spouse: Len Richards

Jill Annette Ovens is a New Zealand trade unionist, politician, and anti-transgender activist. She is the founder and current national secretary of the Women's Rights Party.

She was co-leader of the Alliance party before changing her allegiance to the Labour Party, and then later founding and co-leading the Women's Rights Party.

== Union leader ==
Ovens worked as a public relations officers for the State Coal Mines Department for eight months from mid-1986 while the department was transitioning to be the Coal Corporation. Ovens led a group of women in Huntly in response to job losses among coal mine workers. In her role as public relations officer, she organised meetings at a local community centre where local women coordinated efforts to support the community following the loss of 500 jobs. These meetings also served as a forum for discussing the circumstances of the layoffs, which took place during the transition from State Coal to the Coal Corporation.

Ovens served as the president of the Association of Staff in Tertiary Education (ASTE) and was heavily involved in the Council of Trade Unions (CTU) Women's Council Convenor and attended the ICFTU World Women's Conference as one of two CTU delegates. At the 2003 CTU national conference she called on delegates to push for legislative change to improve work-life balance. Her suggestions for this included moving to a 35-hour working week and legal protections for people in part-time employment.

In 1999, as national president of the ASTE, Ovens responded to the decision to merge Wellington Polytechnic with Massey University. The merger included plans to phase out several polytechnic courses. Under Ovens’ leadership, the union opposed the course reductions, citing their role in preparing students for employment-related qualifications. ASTE also advocated for the protection of staff interests during the merger, seeking to ensure the retention of polytechnic tutors and the maintenance of their salaries.

The ASTE opposed a proposal by Southland Polytechnic that would have replaced salary increases with a bonus scheme for tutors. Polytechnic chief executive Penny Simmonds supported the proposal, stating it was intended to benefit both students and staff, and citing demographic decline and economic uncertainty as reasons for the approach. Simmonds emphasised the need for long-term financial decisions to maintain low student fees and preserve staff positions. Ovens, representing the ASTE, argued that the proposal was inequitable for employees and expressed concern that staff salaries would fall further behind those in the wider sector. Following staff rejection of the offer, a stopwork meeting was held, during which Ovens indicated that industrial action could occur if the polytechnic did not revise its position. Staff subsequently voted to strike, with the union advocating for a 2 percent wage increase in the current year and a similar increase in 2000, in contrast to the proposed $800 bonus and staggered pay adjustments.

In 2001, the Association of Staff in Tertiary Education (ASTE) and 12 polytechnics began discussions to establish a multi-employer collective agreement. A union ballot conducted across the polytechnics indicated strong support for the proposal. Ovens also supported the initiative, noting that many institutions already had identical or similar employment contracts. The introduction of the Employment Relations Act 2000 had made such multi-employer agreements possible.

Ovens opposed Chosun University establishing an English language school at the former Upper Hutt campus of the Central Institute of Technology (CIT). Following the closure of CIT in 2001, Chosun University secured a short-term lease on a section of the campus that had been recently constructed by students from Wellington Polytechnic. Ovens expressed concern that the facilities were being used to benefit international students.

In late 2002 she was involved in a pay dispute at Wellington College of Education when industrial action began by lecturers seeking better pay. A month later, after mediation, the lecturers accepted the offer of a 2.5 per cent pay increase.

Since her election to the Service & Food Workers Union, Ovens has been occasionally blogging on social media websites and supporting union activities primarily based in Auckland. In December 2014, Ovens helped lead a walkout of food service workers at Auckland City Hospital.

Ovens was co-leader of the Midwifery Employee Representation & Advisory Service (MERAS). After retiring as co-leader, she was the MERAS representative during public service pay adjustment talks in June 2022.

== Alliance and Labour activism ==
=== Alliance Party ===
Ovens was a candidate for the Alliance party in Auckland's Mount Albert electorate during the 1999 and 2002 general elections, contesting the seat against Labour Party leader Helen Clark. On the Alliance party list, she was ranked 28th in 1999 and 12th in 2002. She was a member of the Alliance council (its governing body) and was involved in internal party efforts opposing New Zealand's participation in the War in Afghanistan. Ovens expressed concerns regarding party leader Jim Anderton's leadership approach. During a party conference in November 2001, a debate on Afghanistan was interpreted by Anderton as a leadership challenge, contributing to internal divisions and ultimately leading to Anderton's departure from the party.

In 2003, Ovens became editor of the political studies journal Review of Red & Green: The NZ Journal of Left Alternatives. She stood as a candidate for the Auckland Regional Council in the Manukau ward during the 2004 local-body elections but was not elected.

Ovens became president of the Alliance in 2004. She had previously been critical of the party's leader at the time, Matt McCarten, due to his connections with the Māori Party, including his role in organizing the 2004 Te Tai Hauauru by-election campaign for Māori Party candidate Tariana Turia. Following the by-election, speculation arose regarding a potential merger between the Alliance and the Māori Party. Ovens issued a press statement denying merger talks. The Alliance executive committee criticized this statement, leading to the passage of a motion restricting her from making further public comments. Ovens resigned as president, but a group of Auckland-based party members organized a meeting urging her to reconsider. Although Ovens attempted to withdraw her resignation, McCarten informed media that she had resigned, preventing her return to the position. McCarten subsequently resigned from the Alliance in November 2004. At the same conference, Ovens was re-elected president and the party confirmed its intention to run a party list in the next general election.

For the 2005 general election, Ovens contested the Manukau East electorate and was ranked first on the Alliance party list. She served as co-leader of the party alongside Paul Piesse, having been elected in April 2005. The Alliance campaigned on a socialist platform during that election. In December 2005, it was announced that Ovens had stepped down as co-leader and resumed the role of party president. She was succeeded as co-leader by her husband Len Richards.

=== Labour Party ===
In 2006, Ovens resigned from the Alliance party. Following her election as northern secretary of the Service & Food Workers Union—defeating Lisa Eldret, the preferred successor to former secretary Darien Fenton—she joined the Labour Party, which is affiliated with the union. She later served as the Auckland/Northland regional representative on the Labour Party Council.

Ovens stood as a Labour candidate in the 2013 Auckland local board elections for the Papakura Local Board but was not elected. In the 2022 local board elections, she again ran as a Labour candidate, this time for the Franklin Local Board in the Waiuku Subdivision, but was unsuccessful.

== Anti-transgender activism ==
In 2021, Ovens submitted testimony opposing the Conversion Practices Prohibition Legislation Bill. She argued that the legislation could prevent the use of conversion therapy on transgender youth, a practice she supported in cases where it aimed to explore alternatives to gender transition.

=== Women's Rights Party ===
In 2023, Ovens resigned from the Labour Party, citing disagreement with the party's support for transgender rights. She then founded the Women's Rights Party, an anti-transgender party. She is the national secretary and co-leader of the party.

During the 2023 New Zealand general election, Ovens was ranked first on the Women's Rights Party's list. The party gained 2,513 votes (0.08%) of the party vote and did not win any seats.

Ovens contested the 2023 Port Waikato by-election representing the Women's Rights Party and placed seventh, receiving 188 votes (1% of votes cast).

In late September 2026, the Women's Right's Party released their party list for the 2026 New Zealand general election via the website Scoop, with Ovens ranked first on the party list. On 7 November, the party won 1,856 votes or 0.07% of the party vote based on preliminary results, below the five percent threshold needed to enter Parliament.

==== List of leaders of the Women's Rights Party ====
No.	Name	Term of office		No.	Name	Term of office	
1	Jill Ovens	April 2023	present	1	Dawn Trenberth	April 2023	c. June 2023
1	Jill Ovens	April 2023	present	2	Tania Sturt	24 June 2023	c. September 2023
1	Jill Ovens	April 2023	present	3	Chimene del la Varis	c. September 2023	c. 2023 (Note: In the party's 2023 and 2024 financial reports, Jill Ovens is listed as the sole leader, with no mention of Chimene del la Varis, or any co-leader.)
1	Jill Ovens	April 2023	present	Position vacant (c. 2023–c. 2025)			
1	Jill Ovens	April 2023	present	(1)	Dawn Trenberth	c. 2025 (Note: In the party's 2025 financial report, Trenberth is listed as a co-leader alongside Jill Ovens.)	present

== Personal life ==
As of 2015, Ovens lives in Auckland with her partner Len Richards. Sources from 2007 list them as married.

== Notes ==
Party political offices
Preceded by Matt McCarten	Co-leader of the Alliance; 2005–2006	Succeeded by Len Richards
