= Alliance (New Zealand political party) =

- Leader: Victor Billot
- President: Tom Roud
- Spokesperson: Quentin Findlay
- Founder: Jim Anderton
- Founded: 1 December 1991
- Headquarters: Papanui, Canterbury
- Ideology: Democratic socialism; 1991–2002: Social democracy
- Members (pre-2002): Democratic Party; Green Party; Mana Motuhake; NewLabour Party; Liberal Party
- Colours: Red; Teal
- House of Representatives: 0 / 131
- Local Government: 0 / 1,626

Website
- allianceparty.nz

The Alliance is a left-wing political party in New Zealand. It was formed at the end of 1991 by the linking of four smaller parties. The Alliance positions itself as a democratic socialist alternative to the centre-left New Zealand Labour Party. It was influential throughout the 1990s, but suffered a major setback after its founder and leader, Jim Anderton, left the party in 2002, taking with him several of its members of parliament (MPs). After the remaining MPs lost their seats in the 2002 general election, some commentators predicted the demise of the party.

The Alliance stood candidates in the 2005 general election but won less than 1% of the party vote. It contested Auckland City Council elections under the City Vision banner, in concert with the New Zealand Labour Party and Green Party. The Alliance ran 15 electorate candidates and a total of 30 candidates on the party list in the 2008 general election, increasing its party vote marginally from that in 2005. It was deregistered at its own request in 2015, though the party never formally dissolved.

On 1 June 2025 the party announced its relaunch to stand a candidate in the 2025 New Zealand local elections. On 21 January 2026 the Alliance announced it will be standing electorate candidates across the country in the 2026 New Zealand general election. It was re-registered in August 2026.

== History ==
=== Foundation ===
The Alliance was formed at the end of 1991 as an alliance of four parties. The largest of the four was the NewLabour Party (not associated with the later New Labour movement in the UK), established by former Labour Party politician Jim Anderton. The oldest was the Democratic Party (originally known as the Social Credit Political League, and dedicated to Social Credit policies). The others were Mana Motuhake (a Māori party) and the Greens (an environmentalist party).

Until his departure from Labour in 1989, Anderton had been the most vocal Labour MP in his criticism of his party's new direction. Led by Roger Douglas, the Minister of Finance, Labour had adopted radical policies of economic liberalisation, free trade, and privatisation of state assets – sharply in contrast both with the party's background and its campaign promises. This was deeply unpopular both with a section of the public and with ordinary members, but Douglas and his allies, without effective constraint by Prime Minister David Lange, pressed on with the reforms. Anderton, despite heavy pressure from the party authorities, refused to vote in favour of the measures, and eventually quit the party. He contested the 1990 election under the banner of NewLabour, a party he quickly established. He successfully retained his electorate seat, becoming the first MP to leave a party and not lose their position in the next elections.

NewLabour, the Democrats, and Mana Motuhake, all of which opposed the platform set out by Douglas, gradually began to work together to fight their common political opposition. The Greens, who had policies and electoral support, but not party organisation, also took notice. Initially, this co-operation was limited, but expanded after a joint candidate was successful in an Auckland local-body election. In two concurrent by-elections on the Auckland Regional Council (ARC) in November 1991, the parties coalesced around a single candidate in each race; Bruce Jesson of NewLabour in the Panmure Ward and Ruth Norman from the Greens in the Glenfield Ward. Both were successful giving a huge boost in confidence and publicity to the incipient party.

Original party logo

On 1 December 1991, NewLabour, the Greens, the Democrats, and Mana Motuhake formally agreed to establish the Alliance as an official party. This established the three original pillars of Alliance policy – left-wing economics (represented by NewLabour and the Democrats), environmentalism (represented by the Greens), and Māori issues (represented by Mana Motuhake).

Shortly after the official establishment of the Alliance, a small splinter group from the National Party applied to join. This group, known as the Liberal Party (not to be confused with the original Liberal Party), consisted of two former National Party MPs who were disillusioned with the continuation of Douglas's policies by National's Ruth Richardson. The Liberals became the fifth member of the Alliance in June 1992. The addition of the two Liberal MPs (Gilbert Myles and Hamish MacIntyre) together with Anderton gave the party more of a presence in parliament. Later at the Alliance's inaugural party conference in November 1992, Anderton was officially confirmed as party leader and members elected Sandra Lee of Mana Motuhake and Jeanette Fitzsimons from the Greens as co-deputy leaders.

There were also discussions regarding the Alliance's links with Winston Peters, a former National MP who founded the New Zealand First party. Peters was also opposed to the economic reforms being undertaken, was hostile towards big business, and claimed to support ordinary New Zealanders, but was also highly conservative in his social policies. In particular, his views on immigration were incompatible with the Alliance's belief in multiculturalism. There were also problems regarding who would lead any merged entity – both the Alliance's Anderton and New Zealand First's Peters were well regarded for standing up to their old parties, leaving it unclear which of them should be senior (some have also claimed that neither Anderton nor Peters would accept being ranked second – both politicians are sometimes accused by their critics of being egotistical and controlling). Regardless of the reason, the Alliance and New Zealand First did not move together. As a result, Myles and several other top figures in the Liberal Party left the Alliance and joined with New Zealand First instead.

=== Early electoral performance ===
In 1992, the Alliance contested a by-election in the electorate of Tamaki. The former stronghold of Robert Muldoon, a former National Party prime minister, Tamaki was not regarded as an easy run for the Alliance. It was, therefore, surprising when the Alliance nearly took the seat off National after going to first place in several polls. The Alliance candidate, Chris Leitch of the Democrats, finished a close second behind National's Clem Simich, pushing Labour into third place.

In February 1992 the Alliance won a third by-election on the ARC when Mike Lee of NewLabour won the Auckland Central Ward giving the party further momentum. Later that year, the Alliance made further gains in the 1992 local-body elections campaigning on a platform of halting the sale of public utilities. After a strong campaign the party gained control of the ARC's services trust and was able to cease sales. These two performances helped establish the Alliance as a significant threat to the major parties.

In the 1993 election, the Alliance gained 18% of the vote. However, the electoral system meant that the party only won two seats – one delivered by Jim Anderton, and the other by Sandra Lee in Auckland. Occurring at the same time as this election, however, was the referendum which introduced the mixed-member proportional (MMP) representation electoral system, making it much easier for smaller parties to get representation. The Alliance was a strong supporter of this change.

In 1994, Jim Anderton left the leadership of the Alliance, citing family reasons. Sandra Lee was placed in charge of the party. Later, however, Anderton was persuaded to return, and resumed the leadership.

=== Under MMP ===
In the 1996 election, the Alliance gained 10% of the vote. Under the new electoral system, this secured the party thirteen MPs. New Zealand First, however, had obtained seventeen MPs, and held the balance of power between Labour and National. Eventually, New Zealand First leader Winston Peters opted to form a coalition with National, leaving both Labour and the Alliance in opposition.

The Labour Party, now led by Helen Clark, had moved away from the policies of Roger Douglas — both Douglas and his strongest supporter, Richard Prebble, had left Labour to found the ACT party, and Clark's more traditional faction had taken over. This allowed a gradual reconciliation between Labour and the Alliance, a process assisted by the impression that lack of cooperation had cost both parties support. Eventually, this led to an agreement between the two parties in 1998, with both sides agreeing to cooperate in forming a government should election results allow it.

In 1997, the Greens decided that they would leave the Alliance at the next election, believing that they could perform better individually. However, MP Phillida Bunkle left the Greens to remain with the Alliance. Other developments in the Alliance's makeup included the formal dissolution of both the NewLabour Party and the Liberal Party, with their members becoming members of the Alliance as a whole rather than of any specific constituent party. This left the Democrats and Mana Motuhake as the only parts of the Alliance with distinct identities.

In the 1999 election, the Alliance gained around 8% of the vote, giving it ten seats. This, combined with Labour's forty-nine seats and some support from the Greens, was enough to form a coalition government. Jim Anderton became Deputy Prime Minister, and three other Alliance MPs gained positions in Cabinet. The Alliance claims to have made a number of significant achievements while in government, citing (among other things) Kiwibank, Electoral (Integrity) Amendment Act 2001, the creation of the Ministry of Economic Development, the lifting of the minimum wage, a change in funding systems for schools, and abolition of market rents for state housing. The party also claims to have exerted an important general influence over other governmental decisions.

=== Split ===
Towards the end of the parliamentary term, however, internal tensions began to grow within the Alliance. This was partly driven by the party's low poll ratings, which were often blamed on perceived "subservience" to Labour. In particular, many members of the party organisation were less willing to support Labour than the party's MPs were, leading to a rift between parliamentary leader Anderton and party president Matt McCarten.

On 3 April 2002, Anderton and Lee announced they would not stand for the Alliance in the next general election. However, rules regarding changes of party allegiance meant that Anderton and his allies could not officially resign from the Alliance without also resigning from parliament, leading to the awkward situation of Anderton and his allies technically remaining part of the Alliance while actually operating outside of it.

Anderton, along with the Democrats (with MPs Grant Gillon and John Wright) and Matt Robson (formerly of NewLabour), established the Progressive Coalition Party (later just the Progressive Party). Laila Harré became the leader of the remaining Alliance, supported by MPs Willie Jackson and Liz Gordon. The rest of Mana Motuhake also stayed with the Alliance. The remaining three MPs (Bunkle and Lee supporting Anderton and Kevin Campbell supporting Harré) decided not to stand for parliament again. Labour was largely successful in avoiding being drawn into the dispute. The conflict within the Alliance was one of the reasons cited by Helen Clark for her calling the election several months early in 2002.

=== Decline ===
In the 2002 election, the Alliance and the Progressives competed against each other. The Alliance, believing that it would struggle to reach 5% (the threshold for a party being awarded representation proportional to its support), needed to win an electorate seat to gain entry to parliament. It chose to focus on Waitakere (contested by Harré) and Tainui (contested by Willie Jackson, leader of Mana Motuhake). In both seats, however, the Alliance came second, losing each time to a Labour candidate, and so failed to gain parliamentary representation. In the list vote, the party failed to meet the threshold, gaining only 1.27% of the Party vote.

After the election, Mana Motuhake chose to leave the Alliance (the Democrats also choosing to leave the newly launched Progressive Coalition at the same time). This left the Alliance without any component parties – all members were now simply members of the Alliance as a whole.

2003 logo

Laila Harré stepped down as the party's leader on 30 November 2003, and was replaced by Matt McCarten, the party president who clashed with Anderton. McCarten advocated a policy which would see the Alliance focus less on electoral activity and more on playing a co-ordinating role—he had been a particularly strong advocate of working with the new Māori Party, which the Alliance had been involved with and practically supported during Tariana Turia's by-election campaign and the Maori Party launch. There was a debate within the Alliance, given the poll ratings of less than 1%, as to whether the Alliance should contest the list vote in the 2005 election, or instead only stand in electorate seats and encourage its supporters to use their list vote to support the Greens or the Māori Party. Jill Ovens, a former candidate and the new party president, was critical of McCarten's support of the Māori Party, saying that working both for the Alliance and the Māori Party at the same time represented a conflict of interest and resigned at one stage over the issue (Ovens subsequently joined the Labour Party in 2006). When no agreement could be reached on the electoral strategy, McCarten and Harré disassociated themselves from the Alliance. Gerard Hehir, the outgoing General Secretary, informed the Electoral Commission that the Alliance no longer had the five hundred financial members required for registration. In late 2004, McCarten was replaced as leader by two co-leaders, Jill Ovens and Paul Piesse and the party's remaining membership voted to contest the list vote. In the 2005 election, the Alliance gained only 0.07% of the party vote, placing 12th of the parties.

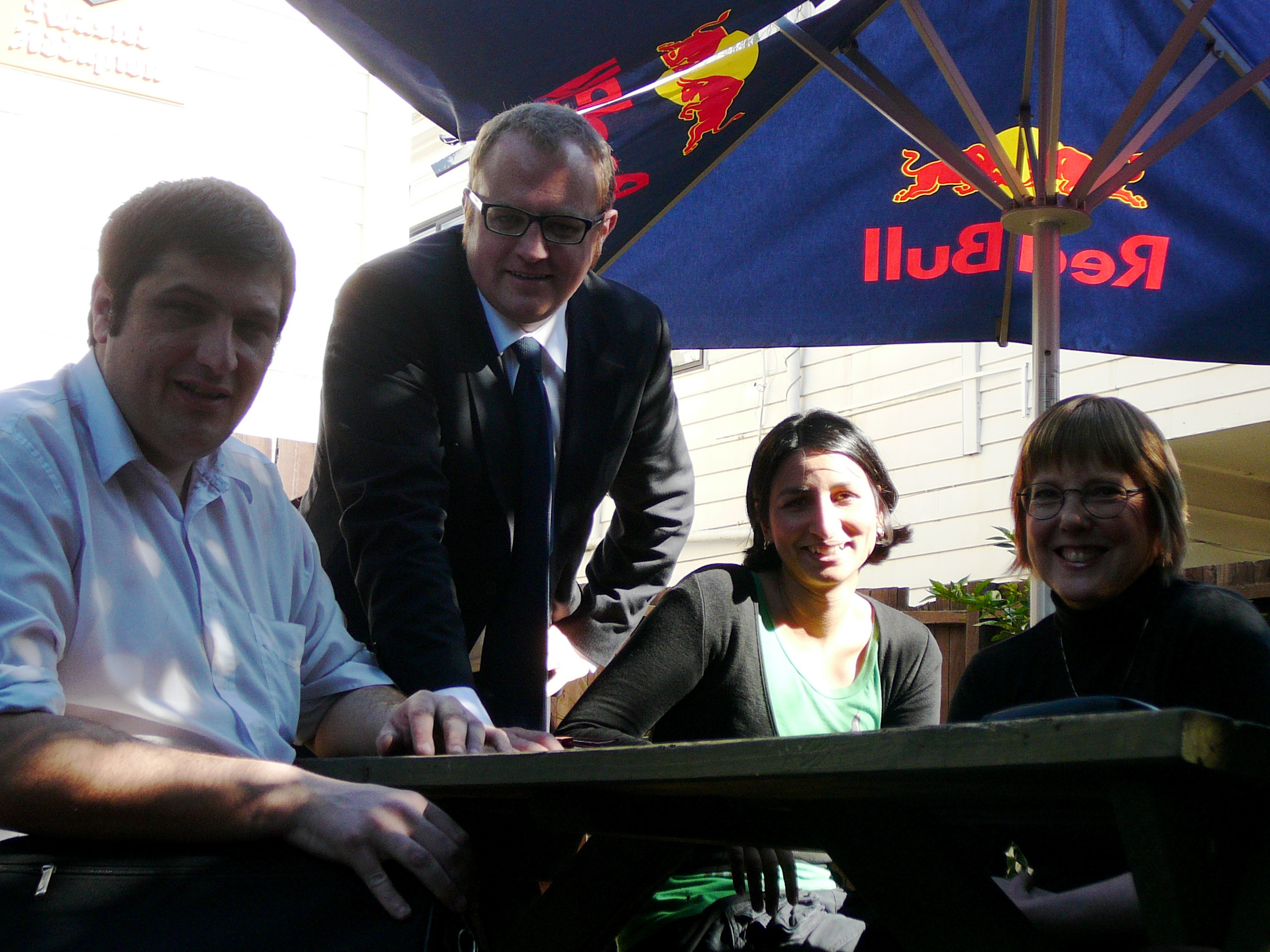
Alliance candidates for the 2008 election: Andrew McKenzie (number two on the party list), Victor Billot (number three), Sarita Divis (number nine) and Kay Murray (number one)

Following its poor showing in the 2005 election, the Alliance continued after their 2005 conference with two co-leaders Paul Piesse and Len Richards.

At the 2006 conference held in Wellington, no co-leaders were elected with the party deciding to concentrate on internal reorganisation. Victor Billot was elected president. At the 2007 national conference, held in Dunedin, two co-leaders were elected, Victor Billot and Kay Murray, with Paul Piesse returning to his former role as party president. Speakers at the 2007 national conference included political commentator Chris Trotter and publisher Jack Yan. The Alliance stated its intention to run a list of candidates and electorate candidates in the 2008 general election. In April 2008, the party had between 500 and 600 members.

During the process of regroupment since the 2005 election, the Alliance reaffirmed its role as a broad left-wing political party committed to contesting both electorate seats and a party list. The party continued to release an annual alternative budget, prepared by the Alliance spokesperson on tax, the academic and intelligence researcher Jim Flynn. In 2008, the Alliance adopted a new logo designed by Jack Yan & Associates to signal the changes it has undergone and its intention for renewal and rebuilding.

For the 2008 election, the Alliance campaigned on stopping privatisation of public assets. It fielded candidates in all major New Zealand centres, contesting 15 electorate seats and running a party list of 30 candidates under the co-leaders Kay Murray and Andrew McKenzie. The party managed to marginally improve its party vote to 1,721, amounting to 0.08 percent of the party vote and placing the Alliance 7th out of 12 extra-parliamentary parties. The Alliance candidate for Dunedin North, Victor Billot, gathered 448 electorate votes, placing him 6th in that electorate.

After the election of the fifth National government on 8 November 2008, the Alliance pledged to "play a leading role in resisting the attacks against public services, workers, beneficiaries and students that will be a feature of the new National Government."

When Jim Anderton retired from politics in 2011, his Wigram electorate opened a potential route for the Alliance to return to Parliament. Former MP Kevin Campbell came out of retirement to contest the seat. Campbell only received 793 votes, placing him fourth, and the Alliance only received 1,069 party list votes, the lowest of any registered party.

It did not nominate a list for the 2014 election, and nominated only a single electorate candidate, Mary O'Neill, who stood in Napier and subsequently came fifth with 59 votes.

The party was formally deregistered with the Electoral Commission at its own request on 26 May 2015. Without registration, the party cannot contest the party vote.

In 2020, the former Alliance MP Phillida Bunkle wrote an essay for Newsroom about her time in the party, in which she made allegations of a culture of bullying and misuse of funds, and of disruptive power-play by an internal grouping she called "the Faction."

=== Relaunch ===
In 2025, the party announced its intention to re-enter electoral politics by contesting the 2025 New Zealand local elections in a press release. In the press release, party spokesperson Quentin Findlay claimed the party had experienced an influx of young membership. As of June 2025, a new website had been launched for the party alongside the announcement. Party president Victor Billot announced the party would contest a single seat at the 2025 Christchurch City Council election, Tom Roud in the Christchurch City Council's central ward. Billot stated the party never fully disestablished but had been inactive for many years. Roud was unsuccessful, coming in fourth place with 407 votes.

In January 2026, the Alliance announced it will be standing electorate candidates in the 2026 New Zealand general election. The party conference took place on 14 February 2026.

In June 2026, the Maritime Union of New Zealand (MUNZ) national council unanimously voted to affiliate to the Alliance under Billot's leadership. He called it a "gamechanger" for that year's election and beyond for "advancing an uncompromising working class voice in New Zealand politics". MUNZ national secretary, Carl Findlay, said the union would also continue its long-standing affiliation with the Labour Party. A few days later, the party filed for re-registration. The party was re-registered on 5 August 2026.

During the 2026 general election, the Alliance only gained 0.04% of the popular vote based on preliminary results, which is well below the 5 percent threshold needed to enter Parliament. The party's leader, Victor Billot, came eighth place in the Dunedin electorate race; gaining 191 votes based on preliminary results.

== Ideology and policy ==
At its foundation, the Alliance represented a big tent of politicians opposed to Rogernomics and Ruthanasia. While the main forces of the Greens and NewLabour were distinctly left-wing, the Liberals and Democrats were not and in the case of the latter, its centrist social credit economics were not reflected in the Alliance's policy. Nevertheless, throughout the 1990s, the party presented itself as an anti-neoliberal, social democratic party (with democratic socialist factions) that emphasised workers' rights, green politics and free education and healthcare. In the coalition, they successfully introduced paid parental leave and KiwiBank.

After moderate, pro-Labour faction left the party in 2002 to form the Progressive Coalition, the rump party under McCarten and Harré represented the trade union movement above all, focusing their 2002 campaign on extending paid leave to four weeks. In 2004, the party published a working manifesto that affirmed its commitment to socialism and collective ownership of the economy, a stance it retains to the present. In the mid-2000s, the party emphasised its opposition to capitalism altogether. In 2025, Victor Billot described the party as social democratic, but to the left of all other mainstream parties, while the party's official materials say it is committed to 'democratic socialism'.

A democratic socialist party, the Alliance supports free education, free healthcare, full employment and the maintenance of the welfare state. Its policy platform emphasizes women's rights, environmentalism, and Māori rights. It supports New Zealand's nuclear-free policy and opposes military interventionism, particularly during the war in Afghanistan. The Alliance supports proportional representation for elections.

The Alliance advocates a progressive tax, which would mean a higher tax rate for wealthier people and a lower rate for poorer people. It also supports the removal of the Goods and Services Tax, seeing the tax as unfair because the amount paid does not vary according to the purchaser's ability to afford it; it advocates replacing this with a financial transaction tax, or Tobin tax.

== Electoral results ==
=== National ===
==== House of Representatives ====
| Election | # of candidates nominated (electorate/list) | # of seats won | ± | # of party votes | % of popular vote | Status |
|---|---|---|---|---|---|---|
| 1993 | 99 / 0 | 2 / 99 | ▲2 | 350,063 | 18.21% | Opposition |
| 1996 | 65 / 65 | 13 / 120 | ▲11 | 209,347 | 10.10% | Opposition |
| 1999 | 66 / 60 | 10 / 120 | ▼3 | 159,859 | 7.74% | Coalition |
| 2002 | 61 / 48 | 0 / 120 | ▼10 | 25,888 | 1.27% | Extra-parliamentary |
| 2005 | 16 / 30 | 0 / 121 | Steady | 1,641 | 0.07% | Extra-parliamentary |
| 2008 | 15 / 30 | 0 / 122 | Steady | 1,721 | 0.08% | Extra-parliamentary |
| 2011 | 5 / 14 | 0 / 121 | Steady | 1,069 | 0.05% | Extra-parliamentary |
| 2014 | 1 / 0 | 0 / 121 | Steady | Did not contest party vote | | Extra-parliamentary |
| 2017 | 0 / 0 | 0 / 120 | Steady | Did not contest party vote | | Extra-parliamentary |
| 2020 | 0 / 0 | 0 / 120 | Steady | Did not contest party vote | | Extra-parliamentary |
| 2023 | 0 / 0 | 0 / 123 | Steady | Did not contest party vote | | Extra-parliamentary |
| 2026 | 11 / 17 | 0 / 131 | Steady | TBD | TBD | Extra-parliamentary |

=== Local ===
| Election | # of candidates | | | | Winning candidates | | | |
| Election | Mayor | Council | Community board | Regional council | Mayor | Council | Community board | Regional council |
|---|---|---|---|---|---|---|---|---|
| 2025 | – | 1 | – | – | – | 0 / 1 | – | – |

== People ==
=== Leaders ===
| No. | Name | Term of office | | No. | Name | Term of office | |
|---|---|---|---|---|---|---|---|
| 1 | Jim Anderton | 1 December 1991 | 10 November 1994 | | | | |
| 2 | Sandra Lee-Vercoe | 11 November 1994 | 7 May 1995 | | | | |
| (1) | Jim Anderton | 7 May 1995 | 27 July 2002 | | | | |
| 3 | Laila Harré | 27 July 2002 (Note: Although Harré became de facto leader of the Alliance on 20 April 2002, Anderton remained de jure leader until the election on 27 June. This is because, whilst Anderton had 'left' the party to start the Progressive Party, he and Harré agreed that he would remain leader in order to prevent triggering the Electoral (Integrity) Amendment Act, which would require him to resign from Parliament if he resigned as leader.) | November 2003 | | | | |
| 4 | Matt McCarten | November 2003 | November 2004 | | | | |
| 5 | Paul Piesse | April 2005 | c. November 2006 | 5 | Jill Ovens | April 2005 | December 2005 |
| 5 | Paul Piesse | April 2005 | c. November 2006 | 6 | Len Richards | December 2005 | c. November 2006 |
Position vacant (c. November 2006 – 21 October 2007)
| 7 | Victor Billot | 21 October 2007 | 31 March 2008 | 7 | Kay Murray | 21 October 2007 | c. 2016 (Note: The Alliance was deregistered in May 2015, however, the party was noted as having co-leaders as late as 2016. Nevertheless, it is unknown if these co-leaders were still Murray and Campbell as they were not explicitly named.) |
| 8 | Andrew McKenzie | c. April 2008 | c. May 2012 | 7 | Kay Murray | 21 October 2007 | c. 2016 |
| 9 | Kevin Campbell | c. May 2012 | c. 2016 | 7 | Kay Murray | 21 October 2007 | c. 2016 |
Position vacant (c. 2016 – 14 February 2026)
| (7) | Victor Billot | 14 February 2026 | incumbent | | | | |

=== Deputy leaders ===
| Name | Term of office | | Leader |
|---|---|---|---|
| Jeanette Fitzsimons & Sandra Lee-Vercoe | November 1992 | 11 November 1994 | Anderton |
| Jeanette Fitzsimons | 11 November 1994 | 10 December 1994 | Lee-Vercoe |
| Jeanette Fitzsimons & Matt Robson | 10 December 1994 | 7 May 1995 | Lee-Vercoe |
| Jeanette Fitzsimons, Sandra Lee-Vercoe & Matt Robson | 7 May 1995 | ? | Anderton |
| Jeanette Fitzsimons & Sandra Lee-Vercoe | ? | 1999 | Anderton |
| Sandra Lee-Vercoe | 1999 | c. April 2002 | Anderton |
| Willie Jackson | c. May 2002 | ? | Harré |
Position abolished (from November 2004)

=== Presidents ===
| Name | Term of office | |
|---|---|---|
| Matt McCarten | c. 2001 | 2003 |
| Jill Ovens | 2003 | c. July 2004 |
| Laila Harré | August 2004 | c. November 2004 |
| Jill Ovens | November 2004 | c. 2006 |
| Victor Billot | November 2006 | 21 October 2007 |
| Paul Piesse | 21 October 2007 | c. November 2011 |
| Tom Dowie | c. 2012 | ? |
| Victor Billot | 2025 | 14 February 2026 |
| Tom Roud | 14 February 2026 | incumbent |

=== MPs ===
| Name | Joined | Left | Affiliation |
|---|---|---|---|
| Jim Anderton | 1991 | 2002 | NewLabour |
| Gilbert Myles | 1992 | 1993 | Liberal Party |
| Hamish MacIntyre | 1992 | 1993 | Liberal Party |
| Sandra Lee | 1993 | 2002 | Mana Motuhake |
| Phillida Bunkle | 1996 | 2002 | Greens |
| Pam Corkery | 1996 | 1999 | NewLabour |
| Rod Donald | 1996 | 1997 | Greens |
| Jeanette Fitzsimons | 1996 | 1997 | Greens |
| Grant Gillon | 1996 | 2002 | Democrats |
| Liz Gordon | 1996 | 2002 | NewLabour |
| Frank Grover | 1996 | 1999 | Liberal Party |
| Laila Harré | 1996 | 2002 | NewLabour |
| Alamein Kopu | 1996 | 1997 | Mana Motuhake |
| Matt Robson | 1996 | 2002 | NewLabour |
| John Wright | 1996 | 2002 | Democrats |
| Kevin Campbell | 1999 | 2002 | NewLabour |
| Willie Jackson | 1999 | 2002 | Mana Motuhake |

== See also ==
- Category:Alliance (New Zealand political party) politicians
- New Zealand Green Party
- Socialism in New Zealand
- Politics of New Zealand
- Analogous alliances of centre-left and left-wing forces that turned into political parties in the 1990s
  - Meretz in Israel
  - GPA in the Netherlands, which became GroenLinks
