= Maritime Union of New Zealand =

New Zealand trade union for waterfront workers and seafarers

MUNZ
- Maritime Union of New Zealand
- Founded: July 2002
- Headquarters: Wellington, New Zealand
- Location: New Zealand
- Key people: Carl Finlay (union president), pres Joe Fleetwood, general secretary
- Affiliations: NZCTU; ITF; Labour Party; Alliance
- Website: www.munz.org.nz

The Maritime Union of New Zealand is a trade union which represents waterfront workers, seafarers and related workers in New Zealand.

== History ==
The union was formed in July 2002 from the merger of the New Zealand Waterfront Workers' Union and the New Zealand Seafarers' Union. In October 2002 a number of the union's members travelled to the United States to join pickets by American wharfies who had been locked out by the Pacific Maritime Association after stalled contract negotiations led to industrial action.

== Affiliations ==
The MUNZ is affiliated with the New Zealand Council of Trade Unions, the New Zealand Labour Party and the International Transport Workers' Federation.

In June 2026, MUNZ national council unanimously voted to affiliate to the Alliance, a party led by former MUNZ national communications officer Victor Billot. He called it a "gamechanger" for that year's election and beyond for "advancing an uncompromising working class voice in New Zealand politics". MUNZ national secretary, Carl Findlay, said the union would also continue its long-standing affiliation with the Labour Party.
