= Pam Corkery =

New Zealand politician (born 1956)

- Born: 18 October 1956 (age 70)

Pamela Corkery (born 1956) is a New Zealand journalist, broadcaster, and former politician who served one term (1996–1999) as a member of Parliament for the left-wing Alliance party.

== Private life ==
Corkery (née Mc Nutt) was born in the South Island, and grew up in Dunedin. She has been married three times, and has two children.

== Member of Parliament ==
New Zealand Parliament
Years	Term	Electorate	List	Party
1996–1999	45th	List	6	Alliance

A well-known journalist and talk-back host in New Zealand, she first entered politics standing as an independent candidate for the Auckland mayoralty in 1995.

She then became a high-profile parliamentary candidate for the Alliance party, and was elected to Parliament as a list MP in the 1996 election. She left Parliament in 1999 after one term. In her 1999 book Pam's Political Confessions, she wrote, "Politicians are, by and large, far more self-deluding, devious, bloated, insecure, egocentric wankers than I had feared." (p. 9).

== Professional career ==
After leaving Parliament, she returned to her work as a journalist, and talk-back host at Radio Pacific.

Corkery presented the live interview show The Last Word on TV One from March 2003 until the show was cancelled in September 2003. She appeared in a 2008 episode of the TV travelogue Intrepid Journeys, being shot at point-blank range with a 9 mm pistol, while wearing a ballistic vest in Colombia. She has fronted two documentaries for the TV3 show Inside New Zealand, looking at the nation's gangs. For The Gangs, which aired in 2008, she spent 18 months with the gangs, including filming an operating methamphetamine lab. The second documentary The Truth about Asian Crime aired in 2009; police cancelled interviews planned for the programme, saying they believed Corkery had a conflict of interest.

With business partner Rebekah Hay, she announced in 2010 that she would be opening Pammy's, "the world's first legal bordello [...] exclusively for female clients". The Auckland bordello ran an ad in The New Zealand Herald offering NZ$240 an hour for male prostitutes. Her application for a resource consent was withdrawn in April 2011.

== Internet Party ==
In May 2014, Corkery was hired as the press secretary to Laila Harré, the leader of the newly established Internet Party. During the 2014 general election campaign, Corkery labelled a journalist a "puffed-up little shit" at the campaign launch for the Internet Party on 25 August 2014. The comments were made in reaction to requests by journalists for interviews with party founder Kim Dotcom about comments he had made suggesting he had hacked a German credit rating system.

Following the 2014 election, despite no formal announcement of her resignation from the role as press secretary, Corkery has not engaged with the Internet Party publicly, and returned to occasional editorial pieces with the New Zealand Herald and other media services.

== See also ==
- List of New Zealand television personalities
