= Matt McCarten =

New Zealand politician (born 1959)

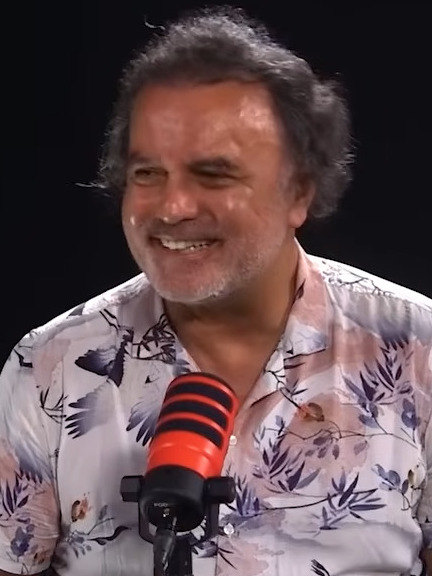
- McCarten in 2025

4th Leader of the Alliance
- In office 30 November 2003 – 28 November 2004
- Preceded by: Laila Harré
- Succeeded by: Jill Ovens & Paul Piesse

President of the Alliance
- In office c. 2001–2003
- Succeeded by: Jill Ovens

Personal details
- Born: 11 February 1959 (age 67) Auckland, New Zealand
- Party: Labour (1978–89; 2013–); NewLabour (1989–91); Alliance (1991–2004)

Matthew McCarten (born 11 February 1959) is a New Zealand political organiser and trade unionist, of Ngāpuhi descent. McCarten was active with several trade unions including the Hotel and Hospital Workers' Union, the Unite Union, and the One Union; the latter two of which he co-founded.

== Early life and family ==
Matt McCarten is the youngest child of John and Rehina McCarten. He had two older brothers named Mike and John and an older sister named Margret. McCarten was placed into care following his birth and lived at the Catholic Home of Saint Vincent's in Herne Bay, Auckland until the age of two. According to McCarten, his mother had been led to believe that her fourth child had died at birth. She subsequently went into hiding and moved to Dunedin, cutting of all contact with McCarten's father and older siblings.

Until the age of 14, McCarten lived at several orphanages in Wellington, Ōtaki, and Marton. While living at the Brethren–run Marton Home, McCarten experienced violence at the hands of staff members. These formative years shaped his rejection of Christianity and liberal attitudes towards sex.

At the age of 14, his mother Rehina learned from his older brother John that Matt had not died at birth. He subsequently moved to Dunedin to live with her due to the death of his father. By that stage, Rehina had given birth to five other children through other relationships. After completing his education at the age of 15, McCarten spent several weeks in psychiatric care at Waikari Hospital following a failed bank robbery attempt, which he regarded as a turning point in his life.

== Working career and trade union involvement ==
After being discharged from Waikari Hospital, McCarten resumed his secondary education at a different school while working part-time cleaning and waitering jobs. Though McCarten passed his University Entrance exam, he decided to work at a hotel in Queenstown. There, he became involved in a successful industrial strike in opposition to his employers' policy of dismissing non-management workers following the summer season. He became a committed trade unionist. McCarten later described John Steinbeck's novel The Grapes of Wrath and George Orwell's Homage to Catalonia as influences on his political views. In addition, McCarten participated in a gay rights demonstration while visiting Brisbane at the age of 20.

McCarten later worked as a bartender at The Trans, then the biggest hotel in Queenstown. After spending eight or nine months living in travelling and working in Australia, McCarten worked as a bookmaker at a bar in Palmerston North before becoming a manager at the Fitzherbert Hotel. By 1981, McCarten was working for Dominion Breweries. Due to his opposition to Apartheid, he refused to serve members of the South Africa national rugby union team. At the time, McCarten was also a member of the Hotel and Hospital Workers' Union, which was affiliated with the Labour Party; making McCarten a member of the Labour Party.

McCarten later moved to Auckland where he worked as a manager, bartender and later helped establish the New Zealand Bartenders' Guild. With the support of his guild, he found a casual vacancy job on the executive of the Hotel and Hospital Workers' Union, working alongside several key trade union figures including Rick Barker and Mark Gosche, who later joined the Labour Party.

Following the 1984 New Zealand general election, the Hotel and Hospital Workers' Union organised a strike to demand a $20 minimum wage. While picketing the Sheraton Hotel near Auckland Airport, McCarten was arrested by the Police. As a result of the Auckland strike, nationwide stopwork meetings were held and the hotel industry subsequent agreed to implement a $20 minimum wage.

As a union organiser, he advocated on behalf of migrant workers who had been exploited by their employers, cafeteria workers at the University of Auckland, and female workers at night clubs.

== Political career ==
=== Leaving Labour ===
McCarten, who had been a member of the Labour Party since he was nineteen, became an organiser within the party's Auckland Workers' Branch during the period of the Fourth Labour Government in the 1980s. The Auckland Workers' Branch competed for control of Labour's political apparatus with the-then Auckland Central Member of Parliament Richard Prebble. In 1988, McCarten's faction mounted an unsuccessful attempt to with control of Auckland Central Labour party machinery during the annual general meeting, which failed due to opposition from the party's right-wing.

During the late 1980s, McCarten became dissatisfied with the Labour party's direction under Minister of Finance Roger Douglas. Douglas was a strong promoter of free-market economics and deregulation, which McCarten and others saw as a betrayal of Labour's roots. McCarten befriended the left-wing Labour MP Jim Anderton, an outspoken opponent of Rogernomics. He later became the deputy chair of Anderton's Economic Policy Network, which rallied opposition against Douglas.

=== NewLabour and Alliance ===
In 1989, Anderton broke away from the Labour Party to found NewLabour, and McCarten became the president of the new organisation. NewLabour later joined with several other parties including the Democratic Party, Mana Motuhake and the Green Party to form the Alliance – McCarten became president of this new party as well.

As President of NewLabour, McCarten played a leading role in coordinating the NewLabour and Alliance's campaigns during the 1990 general election, the 1992 Auckland City mayoral election, and the 1993 general election. He stood for election himself at the 1992 local elections for the Auckland Regional Council in the Manukau ward and was the highest polling unsuccessful candidate. By 1993, McCarten had come to disagree with the structure of the Alliance, believing that it should be one party rather than a coalition of parties with their own identities and memberships. He also disagreed with what he regarded as the Alliance's undemocratic leadership structure. These factors led McCarten to step down as president of NewLabour and become the Alliance's director instead.

After Anderton resigned following his daughter Philippa's suicide in 1994, McCarten continued serving as the Alliance's director under the leadership of new party leader Sandra Lee-Vercoe. Since Lee was unable to cope with the stress of the job, McCarten contacted Anderton's wife Carole and convinced her to encourage Anderton to return as leader, which he did in 1995. However, McCarten later disagreed with Anderton courting the media to boost his ratings by appearing on the Holmes show.

After the 1999 elections, the Alliance became the junior partner in a coalition government with Labour (which had now moved away from its programme of economic reforms). However, some members of the Alliance, including McCarten, felt their grouping had made too many concessions to the more centrist Labour, and that the Alliance was abandoning its left-wing principles. Eventually, a rift developed between McCarten (serving as the Alliance's organisational leader) and Jim Anderton (serving as its political leader) – the party's governing Council backed McCarten, but most of its MPs backed Anderton. At the 2001 local body elections, McCarten stood as the Alliance candidate for Mayor of Auckland City, finishing third with 14.62% of the vote.

After a long and bitter dispute, Anderton and his supporters left the Alliance to found the Progressive Party in 2002, leaving McCarten's faction in control of the Alliance.

The Alliance, led politically by Laila Harré from 2002 to 2003, suffered heavily in the 2002 elections, losing all representation in Parliament. The following year, McCarten himself assumed the political leadership from Harré.

He was compelled to resign this position in November 2004, however, after becoming increasingly involved with campaign work for the new Māori Party. McCarten believed the Alliance and the Māori Party were compatible, and that they should not regard each other as rivals, but this view was not shared by the members of either group. McCarten chose to leave the Alliance to focus on the Māori Party.

=== Independent and Mana Party ===
In early 2005, McCarten ended his association with the Māori Party as well, amid reports that he wanted to found a new working-class based party. In early 2005, McCarten gained a mandate from the Unite Union to take its leadership as secretary. Since then the Unite Union has won significant victories organising workers in New Zealand's secondary labour market ("the working poor"), including those working in the fast-food, call-centre, security, hotel and hospitality industries. Its most significant victory came out of the "supersizemypay.com" campaign, in which it negotiated a collective agreement covering the 7,000 employees of Restaurant Brands Limited (Starbucks, KFC and Pizza Hut). The Unite Union later expanded to unionise workers in the fast-food, call-centre, security, hotel and hospitality industries, particularly in Auckland.

On 27 October 2010 McCarten announced he would stand as an independent candidate for Parliament in the Mana by-election caused by Winnie Laban resigning as an MP.

In April 2011, McCarten became the campaign director of Hone Harawira's new Mana Movement. Following the campaign launch, McCarten vowed to have 500 new members signed up for the Mana Movement before the 2011 Te Tai Tokerau by-election.

In July 2011, it was reported that the Inland Revenue Department ("IRD") was chasing Unite Support Services Limited for $150,175 in unpaid taxes. Unite Support Services Limited was placed into liquidation on 17 June 2011, following a winding-up application brought by IRD. Based on a report filed by the Official Assignee, there appear to be no realisable assets and creditor claims totalling around $153,000, including around $97,000 owing to IRD.

=== Return to the Labour Party ===
It was announced in February 2014 that McCarten would become the "chief of staff" for the David Cunliffe led Labour party. He continued as chief of staff for new Labour leader, Andrew Little until August 2016.

== Return to trade union activism ==
After he stopped working in the Labour leader's office, he was involved in about 100 cases of seeking redress for worker exploitation.

In early 2020 he helped establish One Union, which aims to help unrepresented low-wage workers in small businesses. It partners with the Migrant Workers' Association (MWA) and the UTU For the People network to advocate for migrant workers' rights and campaign for direct action against unethical employers.

== Political views ==
=== Free Speech ===
In 2021, McCarten joined the New Zealand Free Speech Union. In an interview for their podcast, in response to a question about free speech and the Left, he said:

You have not lost your mind, but people have lost their way. They've turned it into a left-and-right debate which it is not. And it is a disturbing trend. So part of my motivation for accepting your invitation to come on your pod, and people like Martyn Bradbury, is that this is beyond left-right. This is about Democracy, it is about how we engage in conversation. Things will only change if we have conversation.

— Matt McCarten, "Interview with legend of the NZ Union movement Matt McCarten", Free Speech Union podcast (July 27, 2021, timestamp 2:10)

Later in the interview, he added,

What some people do, they confuse being uncomfortable...with hate speech. But they're two different things. All change comes through conflict...We all have the responsibility to argue it out...Without conversation, nothing changes.

— Matt McCarten, "Interview with legend of the NZ Union movement Matt McCarten", Free Speech Union podcast (July 27, 2021, timestamp 4:00)

=== Social justice ===
McCarten has an interest in New Left and socialist views, calling into question capitalism and the Establishment.

=== Palestine ===
McCarten has expressed strong criticism of the state of Israel and publicly declared that Israel is "a terrorist state".

In response, Israel's Ambassador to Australia and non-resident Ambassador to New Zealand, Yuval Rotem, sharply criticised McCarten and accused him of "blunt anti-Israel sentiment which is a camouflage for anti-Semitism".

== Personal life ==
Matt McCarten is the youngest son of John and Rehina McCarten. His mother is of Māori descent. He has two brothers named Mike and John and a sister named Margret. McCarten also has five other half siblings- Lexxie, Terry (Deceased), Denise, Melissa and Julie-Anne. While McCarten was baptised into the Catholic Church as an infant, he rejected Christianity in his formative years.

McCarten's partner was Cathy Casey, a former Auckland City Councilor who also taught at Auckland University of Technology. Casey is an oral historian who authored McCarten's biography Rebel in the Ranks.

In his early 50s he had what was thought to be terminal liver cancer, but he recovered.
