= Jim Anderton's Progressive Party =

New Zealand political party

- Founder: Jim Anderton
- Founded: 27 July 2002
- Dissolved: 9 March 2012
- Split from: Alliance
- Headquarters: 296 Selwyn Street, Spreydon, Christchurch
- Ideology: Progressivism; Social democracy
- Political position: Centre-left to left-wing
- Colors: Grey and Burgundy

Website
- progressive.org.nz (archived)

Jim Anderton's Progressive Party (formed on 27 July 2002 as the Progressive Party and renamed after its founder in 2005) was a New Zealand political party to the political left of its ally, the Labour Party.

The party was established when Jim Anderton and his supporters left the Alliance party. The Progressive Party held at least one seat in Parliament from 2002 to 2011 because of Anderton's victories in the electorate of Wigram. The party did not contest the 2011 general election, and was de-registered at its own request on 9 March 2012 .

== Policies ==
Economically, the party was left of centre, and placed particular attention on economic development. It had a particular focus on the creation of jobs, and said it was committed to achieving full employment. Among its other policy objectives were free education and free healthcare, four weeks of annual leave from work, an "anti-drugs" policy, and cutting the corporate tax rate to 30%. It also advocated an abolition of the Goods and Services Tax in favour of a broad-based financial transactions tax, and monetary policy reform. Its campaign slogan was "Get things done".

== History ==
The Progressive Party was established by a faction of the Alliance, a left-wing party that does not presently hold seats in Parliament but was once the third-largest party there. Having won ten seats in the 1999 election, the Alliance went into coalition with Labour, forming a government with Anderton as deputy prime minister.

Towards the end of the parliamentary term, tensions between different factions of the party increased. In particular, the party's parliamentary leader, Anderton, and the party's organisational leader and president, Matt McCarten, became involved in a significant dispute. The causes of the problems are debated by the various actors, but a significant factor appears to be a claim by McCarten's faction that the Alliance was giving too much away to the Labour Party. In addition, McCarten's faction claimed that Anderton's leadership style was "autocratic", and that the parliamentary wing was failing to heed the concerns of the party's membership. Anderton rejected the latter charge, and he claimed that criticism of the Alliance's ties to Labour were "extremist" and would nullify the party's ability to influence government policy. The conflict gradually became more and more severe until Anderton eventually demanded the resignation of the party's governing council.

The party organisation expelled Anderton and his supporters, with Anderton announcing his intentions of establishing a new party. However, because of an electoral law, Anderton did not officially leave the Alliance's parliamentary wing, even if he had left the party itself – doing so would have required his resignation from parliament, a step he was unwilling to take. Anderton had supported this law as a result of the great instability caused by rampant party-switching in the previous Parliament. As such, Anderton and his supporters remained technically a part of the Alliance's parliamentary wing until the election, when they officially established their new party.

The Democrats, a component of the Alliance, broke away to join the new group which was to be the "Progressive Coalition", but shortly before the 2002 election, the official name was changed to "Jim Anderton's Progressive Coalition", a measure Anderton says was intended to ensure that the new party was recognised. Later, after the Democrats had departed to re-establish themselves as an independent entity, the name "Progressive Party" was adopted.

The new party placed Anderton's supporters from the Alliance first on its party list. In the elections, it competed against both the Alliance (then led by Laila Harré, a supporter of McCarten) and Labour. It managed to gain 1.7% of the vote, and Jim Anderton was successful in retaining his electorate seat in Wigram. As such, the party gained entry to parliament with two seats, including deputy leader Matt Robson, who had been a member of Anderton's faction of the Alliance. The Alliance itself failed to win any seats. It received only 1.27% of the vote, and Laila Harré lost to Lynne Pillay in the Waitakere electorate, meaning the Alliance won no electorate seats.

The Progressives took up the Alliance's old position as Labour's junior coalition partner. However, as the Progressives brought fewer seats to the coalition than the Alliance had, the new party's influence was not as great. Anderton retained his position as Minister of Economic Development but lost the role of deputy prime minister to Labour's Michael Cullen, the Minister of Finance and deputy leader of Labour. Robson, who had been Minister of Corrections, Minister for Courts, Minister for Land Information, and Associate Minister of Foreign Affairs in the previous government, lost his cabinet posts.

Shortly before the 2005 election, the official name of the party was changed again, this time to "Jim Anderton's Progressive", to facilitate voter recognition on ballot papers. In those elections, the Progressives' vote tailed off slightly to 1.2 percent, but this decline was enough to keep Robson from returning to Parliament even though Anderton easily won his seat. The indication of the New Zealand First and United Future parties that they would support either National or Labour based on whichever received the most votes may have eroded the Progressives' potential share of the vote alongside other minor parties. As Labour was returned to power, however, Anderton was able to retain his place in government.

In the 2008 election the Progressive Party gained 0.91% of the vote. Anderton retained his electorate seat and remained in Parliament representing the party. In an unusual move, Anderton announced that he would remain in coalition with Labour in opposition.

Jim Anderton announced his retirement from Parliament from the 2011 general election. The party did not contest the election and is now no longer in Parliament. On 9 March 2012 the party was de-registered at its own request.

=== Electoral results ===
| Election | No. of votes | % of vote | No. of seats won | Government |
|---|---|---|---|---|
| 2002 | 34,542 | 1.70 | 2 / 120 | Coalition |
| 2005 | 26,441 | 1.16 | 1 / 121 | Coalition |
| 2008 | 21,241 | 0.91 | 1 / 122 | Opposition |
