= NewLabour Party =

Former political party in New Zealand

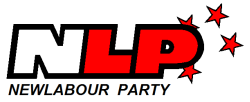
- Leader: Jim Anderton
- Founded: 1 May 1989
- Dissolved: 13 October 2000; 26 years ago
- Split from: Labour Party
- Merged into: Alliance
- Ideology: Social democracy
- Political position: Centre-left to left-wing
- National affiliation: Alliance

The NewLabour Party was a centre-left to left-wing political party in New Zealand that existed from 1989 to 2000. It was founded by Jim Anderton, a member of parliament (MP) and former president of the New Zealand Labour Party, on 1 May 1989.

NewLabour was established by a number of Labour Party members who left the party in reaction to Rogernomics, the economic policies implemented by the Labour Party's Minister of Finance, Roger Douglas, which saw the traditionally left-leaning Labour Party swing heavily to the new right on issues of state intervention, regulation, and taxation. Anderton, who had been among the most vocal critics of Douglas, was joined by a number of other members of the Labour Party, such as Matt Robson, Laila Harré and Phil Amos, and a number of left-wing activists, such as Bruce Jesson. Anderton was the party's only MP before it joined the Alliance.

== Electoral success ==
In the 1990 elections, NewLabour stood candidates in all electorates. The party gained a certain amount of support from disillusioned Labour voters, winning 5.16% of the vote. Anderton was NewLabour's only successful candidate, retaining the Sydenham seat in working-class south-central Christchurch. He remained the party's sole representative in Parliament, which was now dominated by the National Party with 67 seats out of 97.

== Alliance building ==
In 1991, NewLabour and several other parties formed the Alliance, a broad left-wing coalition. Initially, NewLabour maintained a separate identity within the Alliance, keeping its own party organization intact. By 2000, however, many felt that maintaining parallel NewLabour and Alliance structures was counter-productive, and at NewLabour's October conference, it was decided to completely assimilate the party into the larger Alliance structure, marking the end of NewLabour as an autonomous group.

== Former parliamentarians ==
Former parliamentarian	Term
Jim Anderton	1989–2000
Laila Harré	1996–2000
Matt Robson	1996–2000
Pam Corkery	1996–1999
Liz Gordon	1996–2000
Kevin Campbell	1999–2000

MPs elected between 1991 and 2000 were members of the NewLabour Party's faction of the Alliance.

== Electoral results ==
=== Parliament ===
Election	Party votes	Total percent	Place	Seats won	±	Government
1990	94,171	5.16%	4th	1 / 97	Steady	Opposition
1993	350,063 (Note: As part of the Alliance political party group.)	18.2%	3rd	1 / 99	Steady	Opposition
1996	209,347	10.1%	4th	5 / 120	▲4	Opposition
1999	159,859	7.74%	3rd	5 / 120	Steady	Coalition
