= Laila Harré =

New Zealand politician

The Honourable Laila Harré
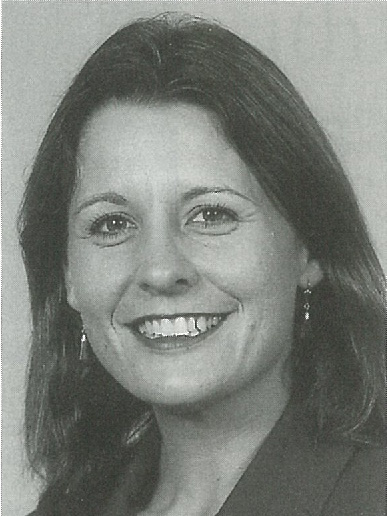
- Harré in 1999

Minister for Women
- In office 10 December 1999 – 15 August 2002
- Prime Minister: Helen Clark
- Preceded by: Georgina te Heuheu
- Succeeded by: Ruth Dyson

Minister for Youth
- In office 10 December 1999 – 15 August 2002
- Prime Minister: Helen Clark
- Preceded by: Tony Ryall
- Succeeded by: John Tamihere

Minister for Statistics
- In office 13 November 2000 – 15 August 2002
- Prime Minister: Helen Clark
- Preceded by: Paul Swain
- Succeeded by: John Tamihere

Leader of the Internet Party
- In office 29 May 2014 – December 2014
- Preceded by: Position created
- Succeeded by: Suzie Dawson

Leader of the Alliance
- In office 11 June 2002 – 30 November 2003
- Deputy: Willie Jackson
- Preceded by: Jim Anderton
- Succeeded by: Matt McCarten

Member of the New Zealand Parliament
- In office 12 December 1996 – 11 June 2002
- Constituency: Party list

Personal details
- Born: 8 January 1966 (age 60)
- Party: Labour (1982–1989; 2016–)
- Other political affiliations: NewLabour Party (1989–1991); Alliance (1991–2003); Green Party (2012–2014); Internet Party (2014); Independent (2003–2012), (2014–2016)
- Spouse: Barry Gribben
- Children: 2
- Education: University of Auckland

Laila Jane Harré (born 8 January 1966) is a New Zealand former politician and trade unionist. Joining the Labour Party at 15, she left in 1989 to join the left-wing splinter party NewLabour, later the Alliance. She was elected to the New Zealand Parliament in 1996 and re-elected in 1999. In her second term, she served as Minister for Women in the Fifth Labour Government, overseeing the introduction of paid parental leave. After long-time leader Jim Anderton split from the Alliance in 2002, Harré replaced him as leader. With the party's fortunes in steep decline, it failed to win any seats in that year's election.

Harré then worked as a trade unionist for the next decade, including as secretary of the National Distribution Union. She returned to politics as issues director for the Green Party in 2012, but left in 2014. She was then drafted as leader of Kim Dotcom's Internet Party, in alliance with the Mana Movement, but resigned after the party failed to win any seats in the 2014 election. She rejoined the Labour Party in 2016, and has remained active as a commentator on politics and current affairs.

== Early life ==
Harré's father was a social anthropologist, and the family spent a part of her childhood (including some years of primary school) living in Fiji while he studied urbanisation there. Her mother was an actress. After returning to New Zealand, she attended secondary school in Auckland at Auckland Girls' Grammar, before gaining Bachelor of Arts and Bachelor of Laws degrees at the University of Auckland. At university she won the senior prizes for political studies and law and became an anti-nuclear activist.

== Professional life ==
After finishing her degree she spent 10 weeks on the Nicaraguan-Honduran border with the "Harry Holland Coffee Picking Brigade" before spending a year working at the United Nations on disarmament issues and as a representative of the Women's International League for Peace and Freedom. She then worked for some time as a lawyer specialising in industrial relations and employment law, and developing close links to the trade-union movement.

=== 1982–1996: Labour, NewLabour, and the Alliance ===
Harré joined the Labour Party in 1982, representing the youth wing on the party's New Zealand Council. She worked in the Beehive as an advisor to disarmament minister Fran Wilde. Throughout her seven-year membership of the party she was a critic of the policies advanced by Roger Douglas, who became Minister of Finance when Labour won the 1984 election. Douglas, an advocate of free-market economics, introduced a programme of radical reforms (often collectively labelled Rogernomics) which alienated many of Labour's traditional supporters, including Harré.

In 1989, Harré resigned from the Labour Party. She became a founding member of the NewLabour Party, an organisation started by dissident Labour MP Jim Anderton. NewLabour later joined with several other parties to form the Alliance. She stood for the Alliance nomination to contest the Tamaki by-election in 1992, but was unsuccessful. At the 1992 local-body elections she stood as a candidate for the newly created Auckland Regional Services Trust on the Alliance ticket. Harré was not elected, but polled the highest of unsuccessful candidates. The next year she stood as the Alliance candidate for the Te Atatū electorate in the 1993 election, but was again unsuccessful, coming runner-up to Labour's Chris Carter.

=== 1996–2002: Member of Parliament ===
New Zealand Parliament
Years	Term	Electorate	List	Party
1996–1999	45th	List	8	Alliance
1999–2002	46th	List	6	Alliance

In the 1996 election, which took place under the new MMP electoral system, the Alliance ranked Harré in eighth place on its party list. The Alliance gained a sufficient number of votes for Harré to enter parliament.

After the 1999 election, the Alliance formed a coalition government with Labour (which had by then backed away from many of the policies introduced by Douglas). Harré became Minister for Women's Affairs and Minister of Youth Affairs and Associate Minister of Labour and Commerce. She later gained additional responsibilities as Minister of Statistics.

She led the parliamentary campaign for the introduction of paid parental leave from Opposition and as a Minister sponsored the legislation to introduce 12 weeks paid parental leave in 2002. Other causes championed by Harré included legislation protecting the interests of building industry sub-contractors, significant minimum-wage increases and the reduction of age discrimination in the minimum wage. She re-launched the pay-equity debate as Minister of Women's Affairs, and a campaign to increase annual leave from three weeks to four weeks.

In late 2001, however, the Alliance began to show signs of internal strain. In particular, some members of the party felt that it was losing its independent political identity and failing to differentiate itself from the Labour Party on issues such as free trade, tertiary-education funding and other core areas. The decision of Jim Anderton and a majority of Alliance MPs to back New Zealand's involvement in the US-led invasion of Afghanistan brought these tensions to a head, dividing the caucus and separating the parliamentary leadership from the majority in the non-parliamentary party organisation (led by Matt McCarten). Harré, however, aligned herself with the grass-roots party view, and became its de facto leader in parliament.

The collapse of the Alliance soon became inevitable, with Anderton and his supporters deciding to contest the 2002 election as a new party (the Progressives). Harré, considered to be the foremost of the MPs who remained behind, was chosen to lead what remained of the Alliance into its election campaign, aiming to at least retain a presence in parliament. Whilst Harré served as the de facto leader of the party, Jim Anderton remained the de jure leader until the election in order to prevent triggering the Electoral (Integrity) Amendment Act that would see Anderton expelled from Parliament. Harré herself was seen as the party's best chance of keeping a parliamentary seat, having a relatively strong chance of winning the seat of Waitakere. In the election itself, however, Harré placed second, being defeated by Labour's Lynne Pillay.

The following year, Harré stepped down as leader of the Alliance, being replaced by Matt McCarten. Harré was still active in the Alliance afterwards and was elected to the party executive at its annual conference in 2003. At the 2004 party conference she chose not to re-contest a position within the Alliance stating that from then on the most pragmatic approach for the Alliance would be to instead support the Greens and Maori Party. She was not aligned to any other political party from 2004 to 2011, but in 2012 accepted a role as issues director of the Green Party.

=== 2002–2014: Outside parliamentary politics ===
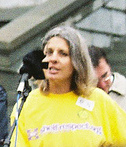
Harré speaking outside parliament buildings in 2006

From 2002 to 2005, Harré led the industrial work of the New Zealand Nurses Organisation, including its successful pay-equity campaign for public-sector nurses. She served as General Secretary of the National Distribution Union from 2005 to 2009, after which she joined the Auckland Transition Agency.

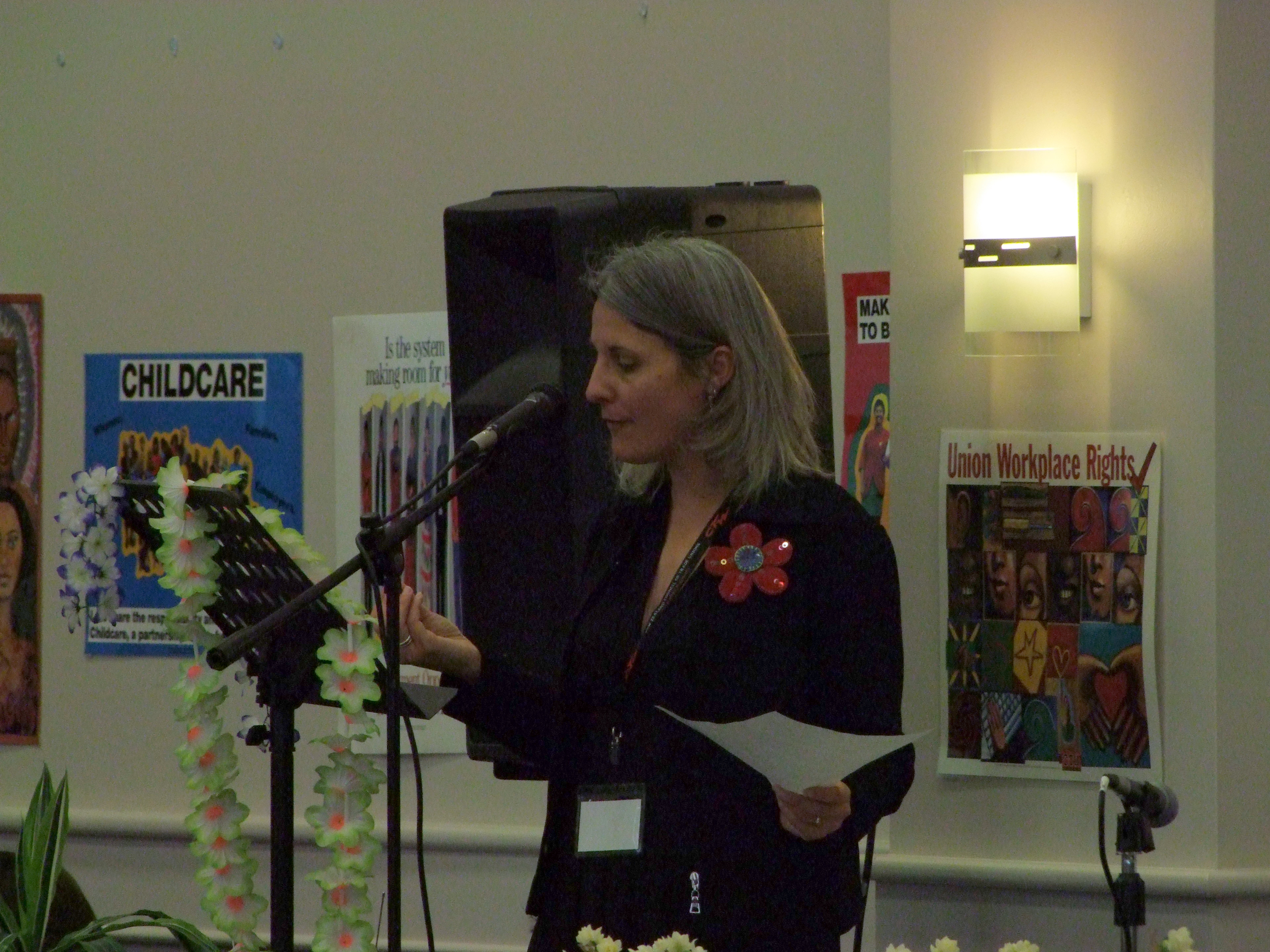
Harré speaking at the New Zealand Council of Trade Union's biennial women's conference in 2009

Between 2010 and 2012 Harré worked for the International Labour Organization in Fiji. Subsequently, in 2012 she started work as the inaugural issues director of the Green Party, a position she resigned from in 2013. Harré quit the Green Party in protest to the way that the Greens had handled a rebuffed proposition by the Labour Party for conducting a joint electoral campaign.

Harré co-owns an Auckland restaurant, Ika, which pays a living wage to its staff.

=== 2014: Internet Party leadership ===
On 29 May 2014, Harré was named as the first leader of New Zealand's Internet Party. Vikram Kumar, chief executive of the Internet Party, initially approached her in early 2014 about becoming the party's leader, but Harré declined. Kumar encouraged her to meet with Kim Dotcom, a meeting which led to Harré taking the project seriously, and subsequently accepting the offer. On announcing the decision, she stated that she got involved again in politics because she wanted to encourage young people to vote, and to re-connect disenfranchised people with the political system. The party allied with the Mana Party to contest the 2014 election as the Internet MANA Party. Harré had second place on the combined party's list.

Following the failure of Internet MANA to enter Parliament, Harré stood back from media view for several weeks before formally announcing she was stepping down as leader of the Internet Party, effective December 2014.

Since the election, Harré has been occasionally writing on New Zealand left-wing blog site The Daily Blog, and undertook a "pilgrimage" across New Zealand called Rethinking the System. In December 2016, Harré announced she had rejoined the Labour Party 27 years after she left to join NewLabour.

== Personal life ==
Harré lives in Te Atatū Peninsula and is married to Barry Gribben. They met through the Labour Party and share an interest in an organic vineyard, a restaurant, and several properties. She also has two children.

Harré was diagnosed with breast cancer, and, because she has a family history of the disease, opted for a double mastectomy and breast reconstruction. She made a full recovery in 2012.

Harré has run several marathons, including the 2013 Boston Marathon, where she was only a few hundred metres away from the terrorist bombing that occurred near the finish line.

Laila Harré is a niece of philosopher and psychologist Rom Harré and the sister of psychologist and environmentalist Niki Harré.

Party political offices
Preceded by Jim Anderton	Leader of the Alliance; 2002–2003	Succeeded by Matt McCarten
Political offices
Preceded by Georgina te Heuheu	Minister for Women's Affairs; 1999–2002	Succeeded by Ruth Dyson
Preceded by Paul Swain	Minister of Statistics; 2000–2002	Succeeded by John Tamihere
