= Jim Anderton =

New Zealand politician (1938–2018)

The Honourable Jim Anderton CNZM
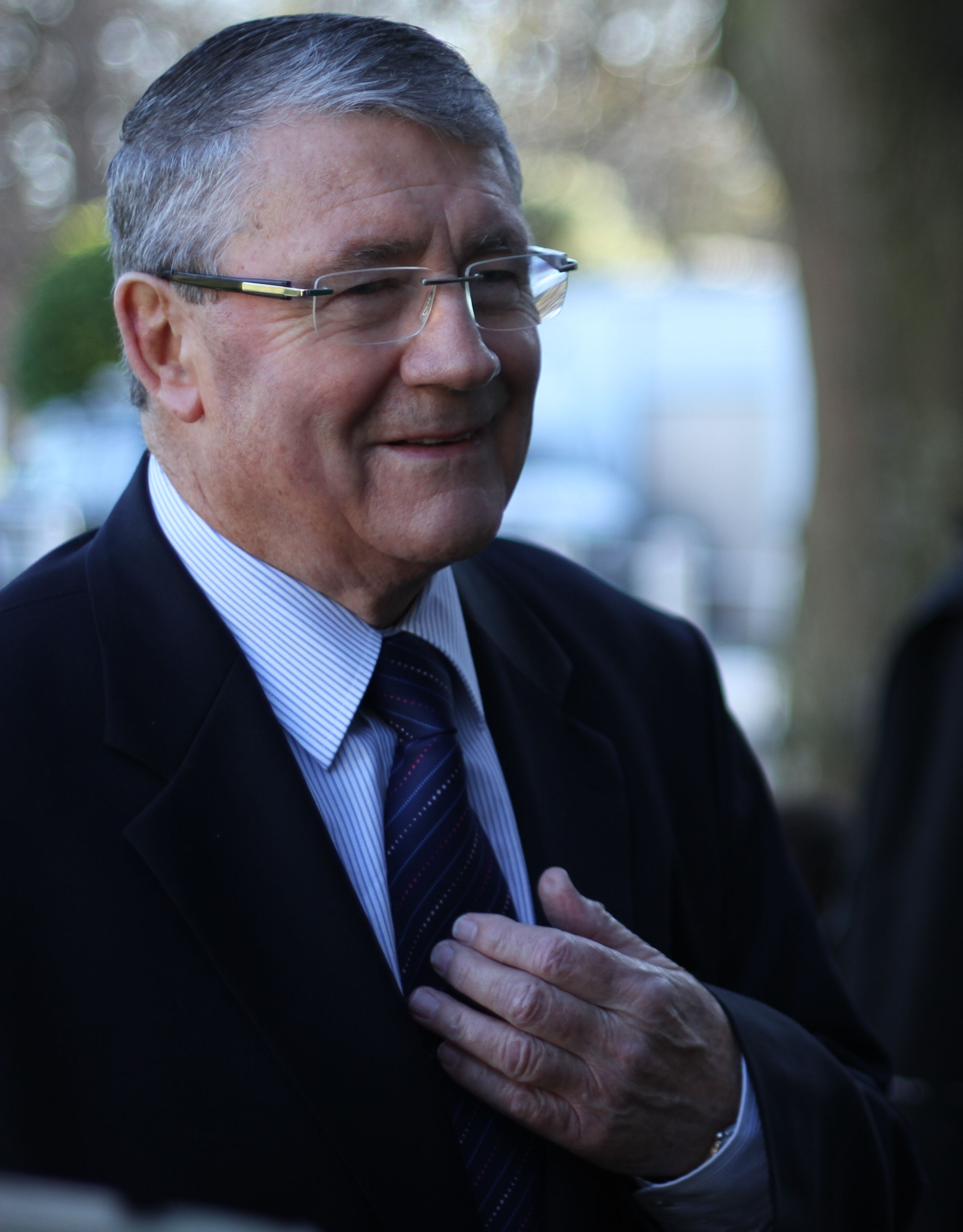
- Anderton in 2010

15th Deputy Prime Minister of New Zealand
- In office 10 December 1999 – 15 August 2002
- Prime Minister: Helen Clark
- Preceded by: Wyatt Creech
- Succeeded by: Michael Cullen

32nd Minister of Agriculture
- In office 19 October 2005 – 19 November 2008
- Prime Minister: Helen Clark
- Preceded by: Jim Sutton
- Succeeded by: David Carter

Leader of the Progressive Party
- In office 27 July 2002 – 15 March 2012
- Deputy: Matt Robson
- Preceded by: Position established
- Succeeded by: Position abolished

1st Minister of Economic Development
- In office 10 December 1999 – 19 October 2005
- Prime Minister: Helen Clark
- Preceded by: Position established
- Succeeded by: Trevor Mallard

1st Leader of the Alliance
- In office 7 May 1995 – 27 July 2002
- Deputy: Sandra Lee
- Preceded by: Sandra Lee
- Succeeded by: Laila Harré
- In office 1 December 1991 – 10 November 1994
- Deputy: Sandra Lee
- Preceded by: Position established
- Succeeded by: Sandra Lee

Leader of the NewLabour Party
- In office 1 April 1989 – 13 October 2000
- Preceded by: Position established
- Succeeded by: Position abolished

Member of the New Zealand Parliament for Wigram Sydenham (1984–1993)
- In office 14 July 1984 – 26 November 2011
- Preceded by: John Kirk
- Succeeded by: Megan Woods

25th President of the Labour Party
- In office 15 May 1979 – 8 September 1984
- Vice President: Stu McCaffley
- Preceded by: Arthur Faulkner
- Succeeded by: Margaret Wilson

Personal details
- Born: James Patrick Byrne; 21 January 1938 Auckland, New Zealand
- Died: 7 January 2018 (aged 79) Christchurch, New Zealand
- Party: Labour (1963–1989, 2011–2018); NewLabour (1989–1991); Alliance (1991–2002); Progressive (2002–2011)
- Spouse: Carole Anderton
- Profession: Businessman, politician

James Patrick Anderton CNZM (born Byrne; 21 January 1938 – 7 January 2018) was a New Zealand politician who led a succession of left-wing parties after leaving the Labour Party in 1989.

Anderton's political career began when he was elected to the Manukau City Council in 1965. After serving for five years as Labour Party president, Anderton successfully stood as the Labour candidate for Sydenham in Christchurch in 1984. However, he soon came into conflict with the party's leadership, and became an outspoken critic of the Fourth Labour Government's free-market reforms, called Rogernomics. In April 1989, believing that Labour was beyond change, Anderton resigned from the party.

As leader of the Alliance and later the Progressive Party, he served as the 15th deputy prime minister of New Zealand in the Fifth Labour Government from 1999 to 2002 and as a senior minister in that government from 2002 to 2008. In 2010, he ran unsuccessfully for the mayoralty of Christchurch. Anderton retired from Parliament at the 2011 election. After his retirement, he and former MP Philip Burdon were the two prominent campaigners for the restoration of ChristChurch Cathedral.

== Early life ==
Jim Anderton was born on 21 January 1938 in Auckland to Matthew Byrne and Joyce Savage. His father left the family and his mother married Victor Anderton. Matthew Byrne died in a train accident in 1946 and Victor Anderton adopted Jim in 1951. Jim undertook all his education in Auckland, attending Seddon Memorial Technical College and the Auckland Teachers' Training College. He graduated as a qualified teacher, but spent only two years in a teaching role (at St Peter's College, Auckland) before moving on to work as a child welfare officer in Wanganui.

In 1960, he married Joan Caulfield and they had five children, two girls and three boys. The same year he became the paid organiser for the Catholic Youth Movement in the Catholic Diocese of Auckland, and later worked as the secretary for the Catholic diocese in Auckland. Cardinal Reginald Delargey said that there were difficulties with Jim Anderton and his employment ended "when he put us in a position where we had to make a choice between him or the Pope".

Anderton later moved into business, working as an export manager for a textiles company before establishing a manufacturing company, Anderton Holdings, with his brother Brian in 1971 and also bought a superette in Parnell.

== Entering politics ==
Anderton joined the Labour Party in 1963 and first attended a Labour party branch meeting in Mangere in 1964. His political career began in 1965 when he was elected to the Manukau City Council on a Labour ticket. In 1971, he stood for the Auckland City Council as a Labour candidate unsuccessfully and was the highest polling un-elected Labour candidate.

Three years later, in 1974, he challenged Dove-Myer Robinson, the incumbent Mayor of Auckland City, for the mayoralty, but was beaten by 7,000 votes. In the same local election, he also stood for the Auckland City Council and was successful. David Lange, who also ran on the Labour ticket as a city councillor said "Like the other candidates, I contributed $50 to pay for an advertisement in the New Zealand Herald in support of the Labour ticket. When I opened the paper to look at our advertisement I saw a photograph of Jim Anderton and no mention of the other candidates. Here was a warning of much to come".

Anderton had another tilt at the Auckland City mayoralty in 1977, but was again beaten by the incumbent though he did manage to reduce Robinson's majority by nearly 1,500 votes. Earlier in 1977 he was elected to the Auckland Regional Authority via a by-election and was confirmed a member at the 1977 local elections later that year despite again losing the mayoralty. At the same time, he worked his way up the internal hierarchy of the Labour Party. He became the party's president in 1979, a year before his term with the Auckland Regional Authority ended. He was also a long-standing member of the party's policy council.

Following the sudden death of Frank Rogers in 1980 there was intense press speculation that Anderton (who was the proprietor of a business situated in the electorate) would stand to replace him in the Onehunga by-election. Despite briefly considering standing, he eventually declined the nomination, refusing to renege on the promise he made to members at the 1979 party conference that he would not stand for a parliamentary seat at, or before, the 1981 election. Soon afterwards Anderton was also rumoured to be contemplating replacing the retiring Arthur Faulkner in the Roskill electorate, but after a hostile reaction to the notion in caucus Anderton was dissuaded from seeking the Roskill nomination. In the attempted leadership coup against Labour leader Bill Rowling in 1980 by his deputy, David Lange, Anderton was among those (such as party secretary John Wybrow) who sided with Rowling.

Following Labour's 1981 election loss there were serious discussions regarding the future of affiliated trade unions in the Labour Party. Labour was frequently attacked for being the 'party of unions' (particularly by Muldoon) despite only 15% of unions being affiliated and providing just 8% of the annual party funds. In February 1982 Rowling gave a speech at a Labour regional conference in Timaru where he suggested Labour should cut formal ties with trade unions, citing the party's public perception being too closely linked with unions and that there had been a large demographic shift in the membership from the working class to middle-class liberals. Rowling was supported by his Shadow Minister for Labour, Fred Gerbic, and several leading union figures such as national secretary of the New Zealand Electrical and Related Trades Union Tony Neary and secretary of the Wellington Clothing Workers Union Frank Thorn who stated their belief that their affiliation fees were too high and offered little benefit in return. Anderton and other unionists such as Jim Knox, the secretary of the New Zealand Federation of Labour, were opposed and argued for a continuing union presence in the party. By March the debate heated up with Rowling and Gerbic publicly expressing another concern that some affiliated unions had members of other parties, in particular the Socialist Unity Party (SUP). Anderton publicly disagreed with Rowling stating that the SUP had no influence in the Labour Party and that "The entire membership of the SUP could be written on the back of a postage stamp." At Labour's annual conference in May 1982 the conference delegates rejected Rowling's proposal and union affiliation remained to Anderton's relief. At the conference Gerbic used most of his speaking time to attack Anderton for publicly disagreeing with him over the SUP. Anderton was more bemused than angered and Gerbic's speech finished with a more booing than applause. As a result of this failure maverick Labour MP Roger Douglas publicly questioned Rowling's leadership qualities and his lack of direction. While Rowling did not respond, Anderton staunchly defended Rowling from Douglas' criticism.

Anderton got involved in the public discourse over the Mount Erebus disaster where an Air New Zealand plane crashed in Antarctica on 28 November 1979. He was publicly critical of the backlash that Justice Peter Mahon QC, who presided over the Royal Commission of Inquiry into the crash, received after the commission concluded that the primarily cause of the accident was an alteration of the flight path coordinates the night before the disaster while not informing the pilots of the change. The report contradicted an earlier investigation which concluded the accident was caused primarily by pilot error to which Mahon charged as "an orchestrated litany of lies" to cover up the real cause. Anderton particularly defended Mahon after a particularly attack on both him and his report by Prime Minister Robert Muldoon. After commenting publicly on the matter Bob Owens, the chairman of Air New Zealand, invited Anderton to a meeting with himself and chief executive John Wisdom. The meeting got heated with Anderton being confrontational in tone (particularly after Owens admitted to having not read Mahon's report in full and did not intend to) and lasted only 8 minutes. It climaxed with Owens calling his security to escort Anderton from the office. Air New Zealand subsequently released a press statement criticising Anderton. Rowling later apologised to Owens for the incident.

Many in the Labour Party (who were already critical of Anderton) used the Air New Zealand incident to attempt to remove him as president. A group of MPs (Michael Bassett, Roger Douglas, Mike Moore and Richard Prebble) organised a challenge for the presidency at the 1982 party conference. They approached former MP and party vice-president Joe Walding to stand, though he declined. Instead Bassett, the most acerbic critic of Anderton in the group, declared he would stand for the presidency of the party. An open conflict drew the ire of many in the party and eventually Bassett withdrew his candidacy. He was subsequently dumped from the shadow cabinet in February 1982 as a result. At the conference Anderton was challenged by Allan O'Neill, president of the Auckland Carpenters Union, but won easily 1,120 votes to 126.

== Member of Parliament ==
New Zealand Parliament
Years	Term	Electorate	List	Party
1984–1987	41st	Sydenham		Labour
1987–1989	42nd	Sydenham		Labour
1989–1990	Changed allegiance to:			NewLabour
1990–1991	43rd	Sydenham		NewLabour
1991–1993	Changed allegiance to:			Alliance
1993–1996	44th	Sydenham		Alliance
1996–1999	45th	Wigram	1	Alliance
1999–2002	46th	Wigram	1	Alliance
2002–2005	47th	Wigram	1	Progressive
2005–2008	48th	Wigram	1	Progressive
2008–2011	49th	Wigram	1	Progressive

In 1983 he was selected as the Labour candidate for the Christchurch seat of Sydenham against 6 local contenders. The outgoing MP for Sydenham John Kirk declared that he did not support Anderton as the official Labour candidate and saw Anderton's selection a sign that Labour was moving too far to the left. In the 1984 general election, Anderton was elected as MP for Sydenham. This election resulted in the formation of the Fourth Labour Government. Some on the left of the party, including Helen Clark, tried to persuade Anderton to remain president of the party, however he declined to stand again at the 1984 conference believing the president should not also be an MP. Anderton was appointed chairperson of Labour's caucus sub-committee on industrial relations. Prime Minister David Lange sacked Anderton from the role on 3 August 1986 and replaced him with Fran Wilde ostensibly for a poor meeting attendance record, but more likely due to curb Anderton's ability to criticise labour market restructuring. After it was revealed he in fact had the second-highest attendance record, Anderton received a caucus-level apology.

Anderton soon came into conflict with the party's leadership, and became one of the most outspoken critics of Minister of Finance Roger Douglas. Douglas and his allies, Richard Prebble and David Caygill, were determined to implement radical reforms of the country's economic system, known unofficially as "Rogernomics". This involved a monetarist approach to controlling inflation, the removal of tariffs and subsidies, and the privatisation of state assets, all of which were regarded by Anderton as a betrayal of the party's left-wing roots, and an abandonment of the party's election platform.

Anderton's severe criticism of Douglas and his reforms earned him the enmity of many within the party, including some of those who otherwise shared Anderton's frustration; his public comments were seen as damaging the party's public image. He released a policy document on 27 July 1988 which was described by Jim Sutton as "looking like a Soviet prescription for a Polish shipyard". This caused much laughter in the Labour caucus. His stance of vocally and publicly opposing Labour's neoliberal direction led him to eschew the prospect of becoming a cabinet minister in the Lange ministry. At the 1988 Labour Party conference in Dunedin, Anderton announced his intention to stand for the party presidency once again. In a highly publicised and bitterly contested campaign, he lost to vice-president Ruth Dyson 473 votes to 575. Optics from the divided conference were damaging to Labour's image showing a clear left/right divide with the left backing Anderton and the right coalescing around Dyson.

== 1989 split from Labour ==
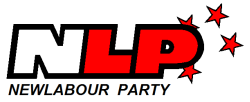
Logo of the NewLabour Party

Although many ordinary members of the Labour Party (who were unhappy at the way the party's parliamentary wing was behaving) backed Anderton, he became increasingly isolated in parliament. When Anderton disobeyed party instructions to vote in favour of selling the Bank of New Zealand (which Labour had explicitly promised not to do), he was suspended from caucus. In April 1989, believing that Labour was beyond change, Anderton resigned from the party. He later said, "I did not leave the Labour Party; the Labour Party left me." All but one of Anderton's electorate staff in Sydenham left with him. Fellow MP and then-cabinet minister Michael Bassett commented "while Anderton liked to portray his differences as ideological, we knew from past experience that his real problem was that he wasn't the one in control of the government, and he could see no way of seizing power".

On 1 May, Anderton announced the creation of the NewLabour Party, intended to represent the real spirit of the original Labour Party. Its primary goals were state intervention in the economy, retention of public assets, and full employment. In the 1990 general election Anderton retained his Sydenham seat, ensuring that NewLabour (and Anderton's criticism) would not fade away. A long-serving office manager and campaign director, Jeanette Lawrence, said Anderton retaining his seat at the 1990 general election was the "happiest she ever saw him". He was the first MP in New Zealand political history to leave an established party, found another and be re-elected to Parliament representing that new party. In parliament, Anderton attacked the policies of the new National Party government, particularly Ruth Richardson's continuation of Rogernomics (Ruthanasia).

In regard to leaving Labour in 1989, he later recalled: "I have no regrets about any of that. Under the same circumstances I would do exactly the same again." Anderton was awarded the New Zealand 1990 Commemoration Medal.

== Alliance ==
Anderton and NewLabour were at the centre of the Alliance Party established in 1991. He became leader of the new party and in the 1993 election, was joined in parliament by Alliance colleague Sandra Lee. Jim Bolger spoke to him after the 1993 election where Anderton was "courteous and sensible and spoke about co-operating, but made it clear he would never enter into a coalition with a National-led government". He briefly stepped down as leader of the Alliance in November 1994 following the suicide of his daughter the year before, but returned in May 1995.

In the 1996 election, the first to be held under the mixed-member proportional (MMP) system, the Alliance won 13 seats in Parliament. Anderton retained his constituency seat, now renamed Wigram, and he was joined in Parliament by 12 list MPs.

Anderton was the most prominent critic of the rash of party-switching (sometimes called "waka jumping" in New Zealand) that characterised the 45th Parliament, although remained silent about his own past party-switching. When Alliance list MP Alamein Kopu declared herself an independent and supported the National-led coalition, Anderton blasted her, saying her behaviour "breached every standard of ethics that are known."

After the collapse of the National-New Zealand First coalition Anderton started a "Go Now" petition on 27 August 1998 calling on the government to resign and hold an election. Former prime minister Jim Bolger resigned from parliament triggering the 1998 Taranaki-King Country by-election. The Alliance performed surprisingly well. Campaigning on opposition to the proposed Multilateral Agreement on Investment, they won 15% of the vote in a traditionally conservative electorate and finishing just two points behind Labour. Following the by-election the Alliance and Labour began co-operating, informally to begin with, in recognition that it would be the only way to win power. Anderton, his chief advisor Andrew Ladley and Lee met with Labour leader Helen Clark, deputy Michael Cullen, secretary Tony Timms and Clark's advisor Heather Simpson to agree on forming a coalition with one another if they each won enough seats at the next election. Ladley and Simpson drew up briefs on what a Labour-Alliance government would look like and how it would work.

== Fifth Labour Government ==
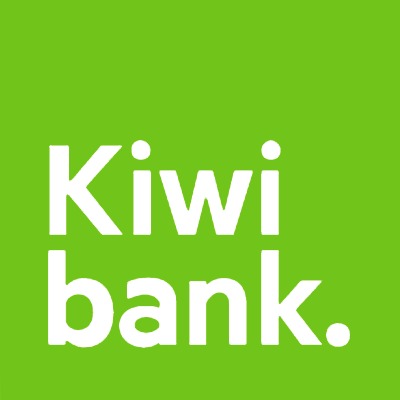
Creating Kiwibank has been cited as Anderton's greatest legacy

By the late 1990s, Labour under Clark's leadership had largely purged itself of the influence of Roger Douglas. Realising that the cost of a split in the left-wing vote would be a continuance of the National government, Labour and the Alliance agreed to form a coalition after the 1999 election. National lost the election and Anderton became Deputy Prime Minister. He was also given the newly created post of Minister of Economic Development, which had an emphasis on job creation and regional development initiatives. Anderton also co-authored the New Zealand Superannuation Fund, a sovereign wealth fund to partially pre-fund the future cost of universal superannuation, with Finance Minister Michael Cullen and promoted the first waka-jumping legislation—the Electoral Integrity Act 2001. Anderton, along with fellow Alliance MP Laila Harré, was also an invaluable advocate in the creation and implementation for 12 weeks paid parental leave.

The successful establishment of Kiwibank, a state-owned bank, is often cited as Anderton's greatest achievement. It was initially opposed by both Clark and Cullen but Anderton eventually wore the Labour Cabinet down following several months of debate culminating with Annette King telling Cullen, "For God's sake, give him the bloody bank".

Towards the end of the Alliance's first term in Government, Anderton came into conflict with the Alliance's administrative wing. Party president Matt McCarten and his allies claimed that the Alliance had become too close to Labour and that it should take a less moderate path; Anderton replied that some moderation was required for the Alliance to accomplish any of its goals. There were complaints that Anderton was too dominant in the party's decision-making and over the fact that he supported the government's stance on the bombing of Afghanistan, while the executive and wider membership opposed it. Eventually, Anderton and three other MPs left the Alliance, establishing the Progressive Coalition, later renamed the Progressive Party. In order to get around the waka-jumping legislation which Anderton had supported, he technically remained the Alliance's parliamentary leader until the writ was dropped for the 2002 election.

In the election, Anderton was returned to Parliament, and the Progressives took the Alliance's place as Labour's coalition partner. Although Anderton won his electorate, the small amount of support the Progressives received (1.4% of the party vote) was enough for only one other Progressive (deputy leader Matt Robson) to enter Parliament. Anderton gave up the deputy prime minister's post to Minister of Finance and Labour deputy leader Michael Cullen. He remained Minister of Economic Development, and also held other ministerial portfolios. He ranked third in Cabinet, behind Clark and Cullen.

In the runup to the 2005 election Anderton renamed his party "Jim Anderton's Progressive Party". However, he was the only Progressive who returned to Parliament by a narrow margin after many left-wing voters voted for Labour to prevent a National government from being elected due to a split on the left. He became Minister of Agriculture, Minister for Biosecurity, Minister of Fisheries, Minister of Forestry, Minister Responsible for the Public Trust, Associate Minister of Health, and Associate Minister for Tertiary Education.

The 2008 election saw a swing to the right, with National winning approximately 45% of the party vote to Labour's 34%. Anderton retained his seat but the Progressives' share of the party vote remained low, at less than one percent. In a move described as "unorthodox" by the New Zealand Herald, Anderton announced that he would remain in coalition with Labour in opposition. He said that a priority for the Progressives would be to support better access to dental care.

== Christchurch mayoral candidacy ==
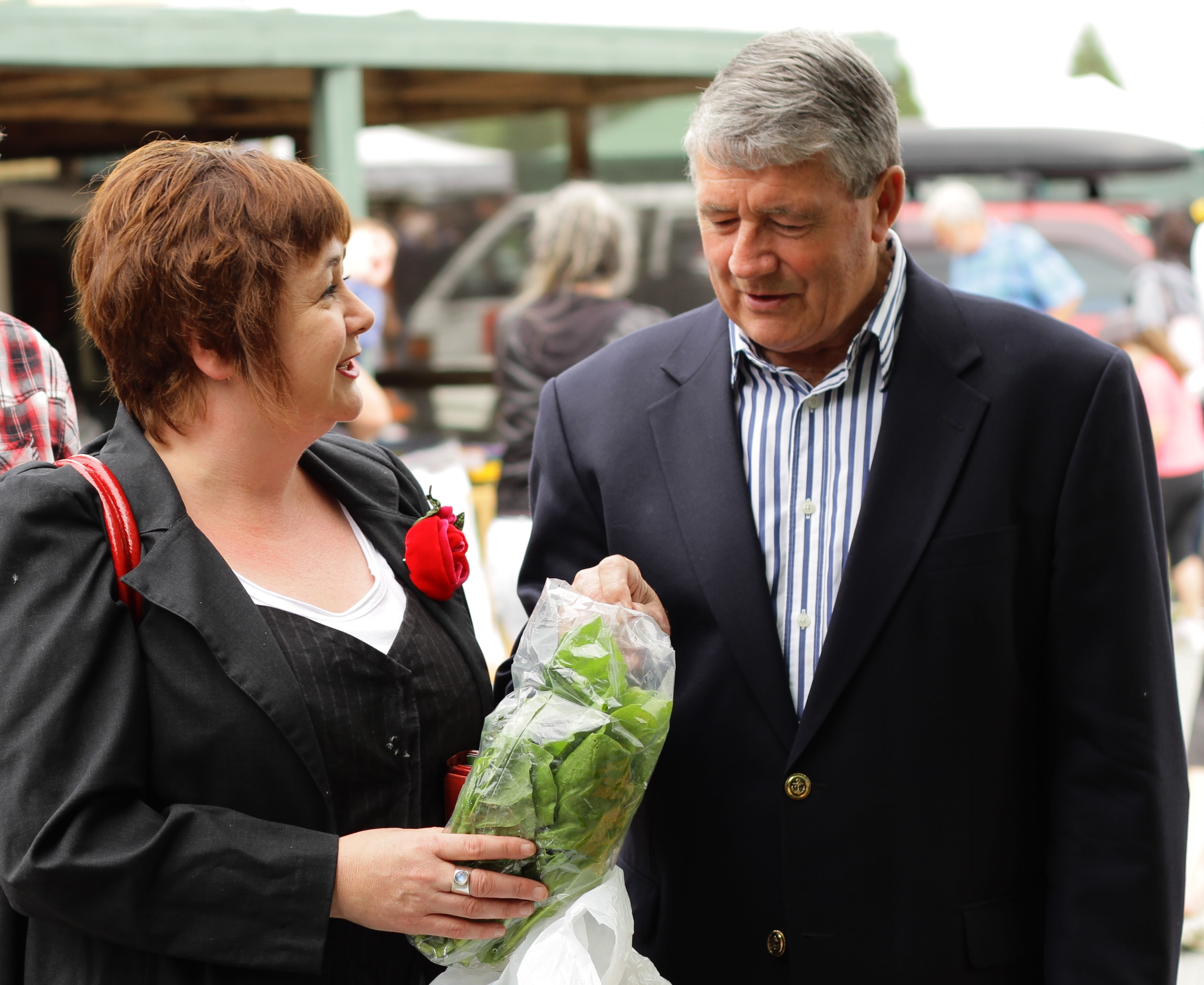
Anderton with Megan Woods (left), November 2010

Anderton announced in May 2010 that he would contest the Christchurch mayoralty that October. He initially said that if elected to the mayoralty he would not give up his seat in Parliament because he didn't want to cause an expensive by-election. However, following the 2010 Canterbury earthquake Anderton announced he would stand down as MP for Wigram if elected mayor so he could fully focus on rebuilding the city. Anderton was leading the polls until the earthquake hit. He lost the election, taking 40.6% of the vote to incumbent mayor Bob Parker's 53.7% of the vote, with the rest of the vote split amongst numerous minor candidates.

== Retirement ==
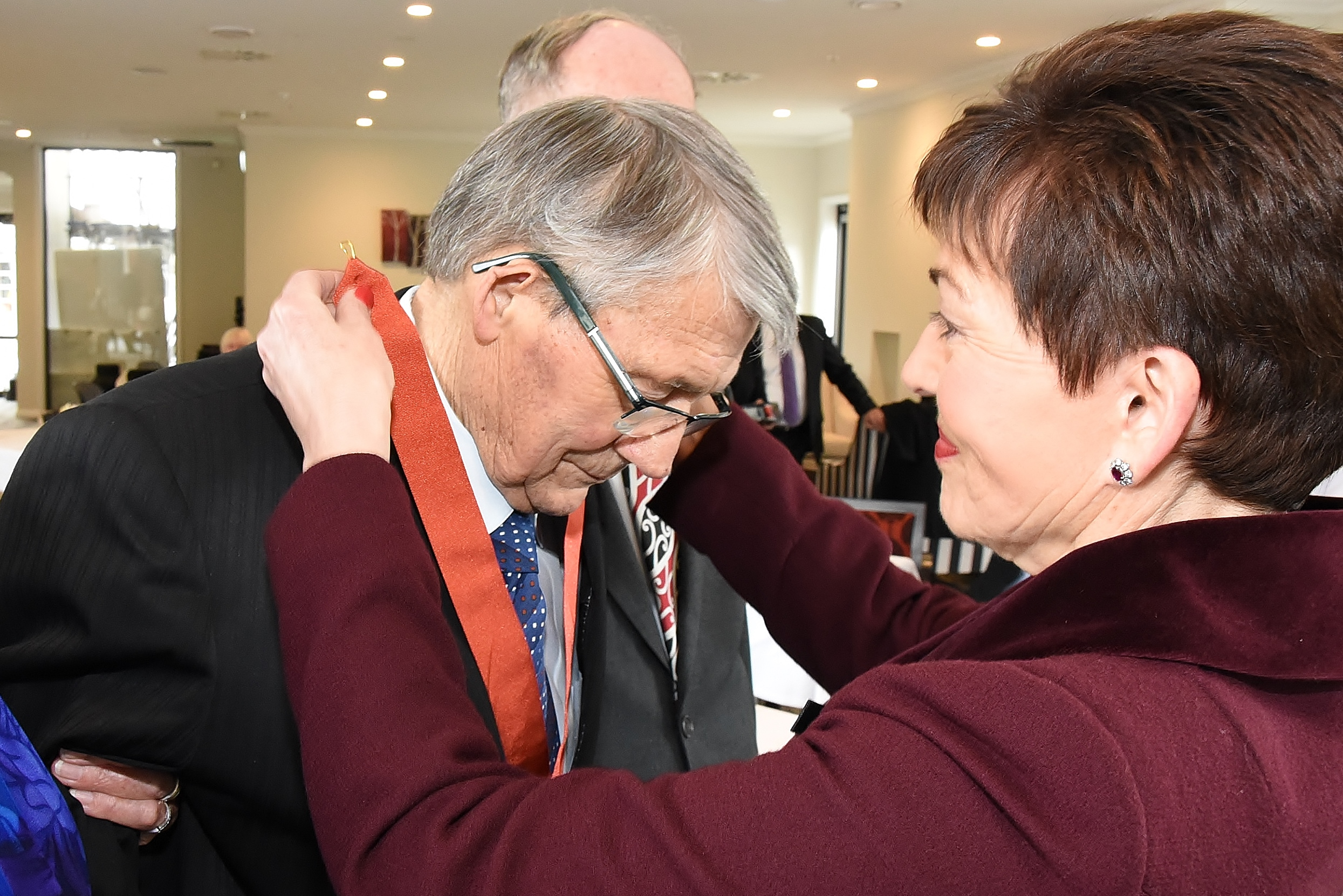
Anderton's CNZM Investiture in 2017

Anderton retired from Parliament at the 2011 election. The Progressive Party did not run candidates in that election. At the time, he held the unofficial title of Father of the House as the longest continuously serving MP. During the election campaign, Anderton endorsed Labour candidate and previously unsuccessful mayoral candidate Megan Woods to succeed him in his electorate. Woods was elected. After his retirement, he put his energy into a campaign to have Christ Church Cathedral restored after it had been severely damaged in the February and June 2011 Christchurch earthquakes; he worked on this campaign with former National MP Philip Burdon. Christopher Finlayson spoke of a meeting he and Gerry Brownlee had with Jim Anderton and Philip Burdon about restoring the cathedral. Anderton "said that he had a couple of points he wanted to make. Forty minutes later, the monologue was continuing and I endeavored to ask a couple of questions. He effectively told me to shut up as he still had more to say. His was a somewhat bullying performance. I felt that if he had shown some more courtesy and understanding to the bishop, there may have been a more positive outcome". They were ultimately successful in September 2017 when the Anglican synod made a binding decision to restore the church.

He was appointed a Companion of the New Zealand Order of Merit in the 2017 Queen's Birthday Honours, for services as a Member of Parliament. On 3 September 2017, he had a special investiture ceremony at Nazareth House attended by the Governor-General (Dame Patsy Reddy), the Mayor of Christchurch (Lianne Dalziel), and former Prime Minister Helen Clark.

== Death ==
Anderton died in Christchurch on 7 January 2018, at age 79. His funeral at Sacred Heart Catholic Church in Christchurch was attended by hundreds, including the Prime Minister. Anderton was buried at Onetangi Cemetery on Waiheke Island.

Figures from across the political spectrum praised Anderton following his death, and the leaders of New Zealand's parliamentary parties paid tributes.

== Notes ==
New Zealand Parliament
Preceded by John Kirk	Member of Parliament for Sydenham; 1984–1996	Constituency abolished
Vacant Constituency recreated after abolition in 1978 Title last held by Mick Connelly	Member of Parliament for Wigram; 1996–2011	Succeeded by Megan Woods
Party political offices
Preceded by Arthur Faulkner	President of the Labour Party; 1979–1984	Succeeded by Margaret Wilson
New political party	Leader of the NewLabour Party; 1989–2000	Party merged into the Alliance party
New political party	Leader of the Alliance; 1991–1994 1995–2002	Succeeded by Sandra Lee
Preceded by Sandra Lee	Leader of the Alliance; 1991–1994 1995–2002	Succeeded by Laila Harré
New political party	Leader of the Progressive Party; 2002–2012	Party dissolved
Political offices
Preceded by Wyatt Creech	Deputy Prime Minister of New Zealand; 1999–2002	Succeeded by Michael Cullen
New title	Minister of Economic Development; 1999–2005	Succeeded by Trevor Mallard
Preceded by Jim Sutton	Minister of Agriculture; 2005–2008	Succeeded by David Carter
Honorary titles
Preceded by Michael Cullen	Father of the House; 2009–2011	Succeeded by Peter Dunne
