= 52nd New Zealand Parliament =

Meeting of the New Zealand Parliament

52nd Parliament of New Zealand
←	51st Parliament	53rd Parliament	→
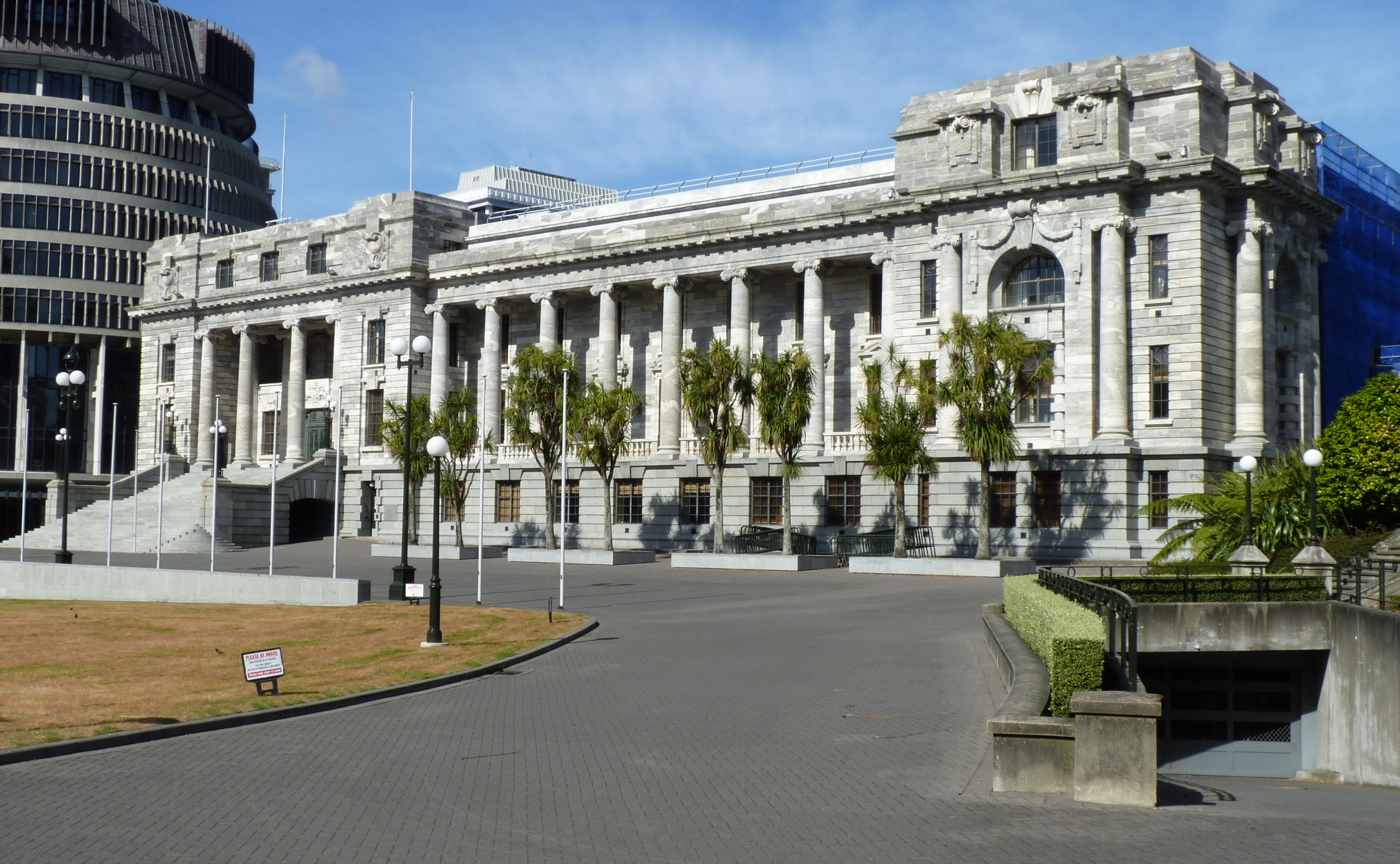
- Parliament House, Wellington

Overview
- Legislative body: New Zealand Parliament
- Term: 7 November 2017 – 6 September 2020
- Election: 2017 New Zealand general election
- Government: Sixth Labour Government

House of Representatives
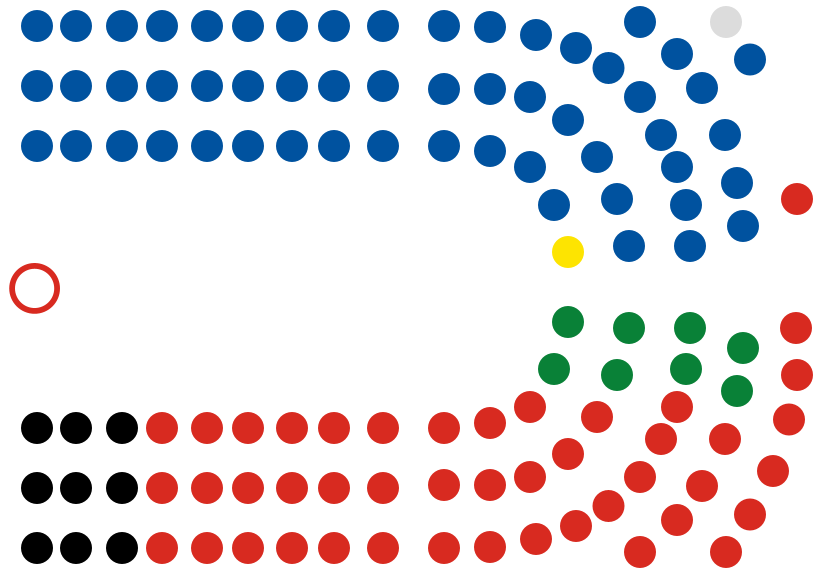
- Members: 120
- Speaker of the House: Trevor Mallard
- Leader of the House: Chris Hipkins
- Prime Minister: Jacinda Ardern
- Leader of the Opposition: Bill English (until Feb 2018); Simon Bridges (Feb 2018 – May 2020); Todd Muller (May 2020 – Jul 2020); Judith Collins (from Jul 2020)

Sovereign
- Monarch: Elizabeth II
- Governor-General: Patsy Reddy

The 52nd New Zealand Parliament was a meeting of the legislature in New Zealand, which opened on 7 November 2017 following the 2017 general election and dissolved on 6 September 2020. The New Zealand Parliament comprises the Sovereign (represented by the governor-general) and the House of Representatives, which consists of 120 members.

The 52nd Parliament was elected using a mixed-member proportional representation (MMP) voting system. Members of Parliament (MPs) represent 71 geographical electorates: 16 in the South Island, 48 in the North Island and 7 Māori electorates. The remaining members were elected from party lists using the Sainte-Laguë method to achieve proportionality. The number of geographical electorates was increased by one at the 2014 election, to account for the North Island's higher population growth.

== Background ==
=== 2017 general election ===
The 2017 general election was held on Saturday, 23 September 2017. Voters elected 120 members to the House of Representatives, with 71 electorate members and 49 list members. Official results indicated that the National Party had won a plurality, winning 56 seats; down from 60 in 2014. The Labour Party won 46 seats, up from 32 at the last election. Their partner, the Green Party won 8 seats, down from 14. New Zealand First won 9 seats, down from 11. ACT won the electorate of Epsom, and enough party votes to avoid an overhang, but failed to win any more party votes to entitle it to more seats.

=== Formation ===
Since neither the National–ACT or Labour–Green blocs managed to reach the necessary majority to form a government, New Zealand First was left in the position of kingmaker. Negotiations between New Zealand First and each of National and Labour continued over the next four weeks. On 19 October, Winston Peters announced he was forming a coalition agreement with Labour, with the Greens in a confidence-and-supply agreement. The Greens' support, plus the coalition, resulting in 63 seats to National's 56 – enough to ensure that Ardern maintained the confidence of the House. On 26 October 2017, Jacinda Ardern was sworn in as prime minister by Governor-General Dame Patsy Reddy.

== Parliamentary term ==
Jacinda Ardern, as Leader of the Labour Party, serves as Prime Minister. Winston Peters, as Leader of New Zealand First, serves as Deputy Prime Minister and Minister of Foreign Affairs. Prime Minister Ardern appointed Grant Robertson as Minister of Finance, Ron Mark as Minister of Defence, Kelvin Davis as Minister of Corrections, David Parker as Attorney General, Andrew Little as Minister of Justice, Dr David Clark as Minister of Health, and Chris Hipkins as Minister of Education and Leader of the House.

For a period of six weeks beginning 21 June 2018, Winston Peters served as Acting Prime Minister of New Zealand, while Prime Minister Jacinda Ardern took maternity leave. Ardern was only the second head of government to give birth while in office, after Benazir Bhutto, who gave birth while serving as Prime Minister of Pakistan.

=== Major events ===
- 12 October 2017 — The writ for election is returned; officially declaring all elected members of the 52nd Parliament.
- 19 October 2017 — A coalition government between Labour and NZ First is confirmed, with C&S from the Green Party.
- 25 October 2017 — Chris Hipkins is confirmed Leader of the House.
- 26 October 2017 — Jacinda Ardern is sworn in as Prime Minister of New Zealand.
- 7 November 2017 — The Governor-General issued the Commission of Opening of Parliament. The House elected Trevor Mallard as Speaker.
- 8 November 2017 — State Opening of Parliament.
- 13 February 2018 — Bill English announced he would resign as Leader of the National Party and Leader of the Opposition on 27 February, before retiring from Parliament on 1 March, thus resigning as Father of the House.
- 27 February 2018 — Simon Bridges is elected as National Party leader, succeeding Bill English as Party Leader and Leader of the Opposition
- 27 February 2018 — Fletcher Tabuteau replaces Ron Mark as Deputy Leader of New Zealand First
- 22 March 2018 — Jonathan Coleman, MP for Northcote, resigns from Parliament, triggering a by-election in Northcote.
- 8 April 2018 — Marama Davidson is elected the female co-leader of the Green Party.
- 17 May 2018 — The 2018 budget is presented to Parliament.
- 21 June 2018 — Prime Minister Jacinda Ardern takes maternity leave following giving birth to a baby girl. Winston Peters becomes acting Prime Minister.
- 2 August 2018 — Jacinda Ardern returns as Prime Minister after six weeks of maternity leave.
- 7 September 2018 — Labour MP Clare Curran resigns from all of her ministerial portfolios.
- 20 September 2018 — Labour MP Meka Whaitiri is removed as a minister following an investigation of an alleged assault in her office.
- 30 May 2019 — The 2019 budget, also named the Wellbeing Budget, is presented to Parliament.
- 14 May 2020 — The 2020 budget, also named Rebuilding Together is presented to Parliament.
- 22 May 2020 — Todd Muller is elected as National Party leader, defeating Simon Bridges and succeeding him as Party Leader and Leader of the Opposition. Nikki Kaye defeats Paula Bennett for the role of deputy leader.
- 14 July 2020 — Todd Muller resigns and Judith Collins is elected as leader of the National Party. Gerry Brownlee becomes deputy leader of the National Party.
- 21 July 2020 — Andrew Falloon, MP for Rangitata, resigns from Parliament following revelations he sent unsolicited sexually explicit text messages to young women.
- 22 July 2020 — Iain Lees-Galloway, MP for Palmerston North, is removed as a minister following revelations he had an inappropriate relationship with a staffer.
- 6 August 2020 – The last intended sitting is held, concluding with the adjournment debate.
- 12 August 2020 – The dissolution of Parliament is delayed after new community-spread cases of COVID-19 were reported in Auckland the previous day.
- 18 August 2020 – The House resumes limited sittings following the delayed dissolution.
- 2 September 2020 – The last sitting day of the Parliament.
- 6 September 2020 – The Parliament is dissolved.

=== Major legislation ===
On 31 October 2017, Prime Minister Jacinda Ardern announced that for their first bill, the government would amend the Overseas Investment Act 2005 to categorise existing residential properties as "sensitive", restricting its sale to citizens and permanent residents only. The Overseas Investment Amendment Act 2018 was introduced on 14 December 2017 and received royal assent on 22 August 2018.

On 8 November 2017, the Parental Leave and Employment Protection Amendment Bill was introduced and received royal assent on 4 December 2017. It extends paid parental leave to 22 weeks starting from 1 July 2018 and 26 weeks from 1 July 2020.

On 4 December 2017, royal assent was given to the Healthy Homes Guarantee Bill, which was introduced on 15 October 2015 during the previous Parliament. It ensures every rental house in the country meets standards of heating and insulation.

On 22 December 2017, the Misuse of Drugs (Medicinal Cannabis) Amendment Bill was introduced, receiving royal assent on 17 December 2018. The act amends the Misuse of Drugs Act 1975 to allow terminally ill patients to use cannabis, provide a regulatory body to set standards for cannabis products, and declassify cannabidiol as a controlled substance.

On 11 April 2019, royal assent was given to the Arms (Prohibited Firearms, Magazines, and Parts) Amendment Act 2019. It amended the Arms Act 1983 to ban semi-automatic firearms, magazines, and parts that can be used to assemble prohibited firearms.

On 8 May 2019, the Climate Change Response (Zero Carbon) Amendment Bill was introduced, receiving royal assent on 13 November 2019. It provides a framework for developing climate change policies in support of the Paris Agreement.

On 23 March 2020, the Abortion Legislation Act received royal assent, decriminalising abortion. Under the act, women can seek an abortion without restrictions within the first 20 weeks of their pregnancy.

On 12 May 2020, the COVID-19 Public Health Response Bill was introduced and speedily passed, receiving royal assent the day after. The bill establishes standalone legislation that provides a legal framework for responding to the COVID-19 pandemic in New Zealand for a period of up to 2 years.

=== Dissolution ===
Under section 17 of the Constitution Act 1986, Parliament must dissolve a maximum of "3 years from the day fixed for the return of the writs issued for the last preceding general election of members of the House of Representatives, and no longer." The writ for the 2017 election was issued on 23 August 2017 and returned on 12 October 2017, meaning that the 52nd Parliament would have to dissolve on or before 12 October 2020.

This Parliament had its last scheduled sitting on 6 August 2020 and was originally set to be dissolved on 12 August. However, the dissolution of Parliament was delayed to 17 August after four cases of COVID-19 outside of a quarantine facility were reported in Auckland leading to an increase in the region's alert level, and was later delayed further to 6 September. Parliament resumed sitting on 18 August for a further three weeks. The business of the House in this period was limited, sitting only two days a week, for no more than two hours at a time, and for the sole purpose of scrutinising the government's response to COVID-19, with no further legislation progressed. The last sitting of the additional period was held on 2 September, and the Parliament was dissolved as scheduled on 6 September.

== Officeholders ==
=== Speaker ===
- Speaker of the House: Rt. Hon. Trevor Mallard (Labour)
- Deputy Speaker of the House: Hon. Anne Tolley (National)
- Assistant Speaker of the House: Hon. Ruth Dyson (Labour) (from 3 July 2019)
  - Poto Williams (Labour) (until 3 July 2019)
- Assistant Speaker of the House: Adrian Rurawhe (Labour)

==== Other parliamentary officers ====
The following is a list of other parliamentary officers who are non-political:

- Clerk: David Wilson
- Deputy Clerk: Suze Jones
- Serjeant-at-Arms: Steve Streefkerk

=== Party leaders ===
- Prime Minister of New Zealand: Rt. Hon. Jacinda Ardern (Labour)
  - Deputy Leader of the Labour Party: Hon. Kelvin Davis
- Deputy Prime Minister of New Zealand: Rt. Hon. Winston Peters (New Zealand First)
  - Deputy Leader of New Zealand First:
    - Hon. Ron Mark (until 27 February 2018)
    - Fletcher Tabuteau (from 27 February 2018)
- Leader of the Opposition (National):
  - Rt. Hon. Bill English (until 27 February 2018)
  - Hon. Simon Bridges (from 27 February 2018 to 22 May 2020)
  - Todd Muller (from 22 May 2020 to 14 July 2020)
  - Hon. Judith Collins (since 14 July 2020)
    - Deputy Leader of the Opposition (National):
      - Hon. Paula Bennett (until 22 May 2020)
      - Hon. Nikki Kaye (from 22 May 2020 to 14 July 2020)
      - Hon. Gerry Brownlee (from 14 July 2020)
- Co-leaders of the Green Party of Aotearoa New Zealand:
  - Male Co-leader: Hon. James Shaw
  - Female Co-leader: Marama Davidson (from 8 April 2018)
- Leader of ACT New Zealand: David Seymour

=== Floor leaders ===
- Leader of the House: Hon. Chris Hipkins
  - Deputy Leader of the House: Hon. Iain Lees-Galloway until 21 July 2020
- Shadow Leader of the House:
  - Hon. Simon Bridges until 27 February 2018
  - Hon. Gerry Brownlee from 11 March 2018 to 16 July 2020
  - Chris Bishop from 16 July 2020

=== Whips ===
- Senior Government Whip:
  - Michael Wood from 27 June 2019
  - Hon. Ruth Dyson until 27 June 2019
    - Junior Labour Whip: Kieran McAnulty
    - Assistant Labour Whip: Kiri Allan
- Senior Opposition Whip:
  - Barbara Kuriger from 11 March 2018
  - Jami-Lee Ross until 11 March 2018
    - Junior Opposition Whip:
      - Matt Doocey from 11 March 2018
      - Barbara Kuriger until 11 March 2018
    - Third Opposition Whip:
      - Tim van de Molen from 11 March 2018
      - Matt Doocey until 11 March 2018
- New Zealand First Whip: Clayton Mitchell
- Green Party Musterer:
  - Chlöe Swarbrick from 18 November 2019
  - Gareth Hughes until 18 November 2019
    - Green Party Deputy Musterer:
      - Chlöe Swarbrick from 6 May 2018 until 18 November 2019
      - Marama Davidson until 8 April 2018

=== Shadow Cabinets ===
- Opposition Cabinet of Judith Collins during the 52nd Parliament from 14 July 2020
  - Opposition Cabinet of Todd Muller during the 52nd Parliament from 22 May 2020 until 14 July 2020
  - Opposition Cabinet of Simon Bridges during the 52nd Parliament from 11 March 2018 until 22 May 2020
  - Opposition Cabinet of Bill English during the 52nd Parliament until 27 February 2018

== Members ==
The table below show the members of the 52nd Parliament based on the official results of the 2017 general election. Ministerial roles were officially announced on 25 October 2017.

=== Overview ===
This table shows the number of MPs in each party:

Affiliation	Members	
Affiliation	At 2017 election	At dissolution
Labour	46	46
NZ First ^{Coa}	9	9
Green ^{CS}	8	8
Government total	63	63
National	56	54
ACT	1	1
Independent	0	1
Opposition total	57	56
Total	120	119
Working Government majority	6	7
Vacant	0	1

Notes

- ^Coa New Zealand First announced a coalition agreement with the Labour Party on 19 October 2017.
- ^CS The Green Party entered into confidence-and-supply agreement with the Labour Party on the same day as the coalition was announced.
- The Working Government majority is calculated as all Government MPs less all other parties.

=== Members ===
Labour (46)
Rank	Name	Electorate (list if blank)	Term in office	Portfolios & Responsibilities
Ministers in Cabinet
1	Jacinda Ardern	Mount Albert	2008–	Prime Minister; Leader of the Labour Party; Minister of National Security and Intelligence; Minister for Arts, Culture and Heritage; Minister for Child Poverty Reduction; Chair of the Intelligence and Security Specialist Committee
2	Kelvin Davis	Te Tai Tokerau	2008–11; 2014–	Deputy Leader of the Labour Party; Minister of Corrections; Minister for Māori Crown Relations: Te Arawhiti; Minister of Tourism; Associate Minister of Education (Māori Education)
3	Grant Robertson	Wellington Central	2008–	Minister of Finance; Minister for Sport and Recreation; Minister Responsible for the Earthquake Commission; Associate Minister for Arts, Culture and Heritage
4	Phil Twyford	Te Atatū	2008–	Minister for Economic Development; Minister of Transport; Minister for Urban Development
5	Megan Woods	Wigram	2011–	Minister of Energy and Resources; Minister for Greater Christchurch Regeneration; Minister of Housing; Minister for Research, Science and Innovation
6	Chris Hipkins	Rimutaka	2008–	Leader of the House; Minister of Education; Minister of Health; Minister of State Services; Minister Responsible for Ministerial Services
7	Andrew Little		2011–	Minister of Justice; Minister for Courts; Minister Responsible for the GCSB; Minister Responsible for the NZSIS; Minister for Treaty of Waitangi Negotiations; Minister Responsible for Pike River Re-entry; Minister for Workplace Relations and Safety
8	Carmel Sepuloni	Kelston	2008–11; 2014–	Minister for Social Development; Minister for ACC; Minister for Disability Issues; Associate Minister for Arts, Culture and Heritage; Associate Minister for Pacific Peoples
9	David Parker		2002–	Attorney-General; Minister for the Environment; Minister for Trade and Export Growth; Associate Minister of Finance; Chair of the Privileges Specialist Committee
10	Nanaia Mahuta	Hauraki-Waikato	1996–	Minister for Māori Development; Minister of Local Government; Associate Minister for the Environment; Associate Minister of Housing (Māori Housing); Associate Minister for Trade and Export Growth
11	Stuart Nash	Napier	2008–2011; 2014–	Minister of Police; Minister of Fisheries; Minister of Revenue; Minister for Small Business
12	Jenny Salesa	Manukau East	2014–	Minister for Building and Construction; Minister of Customs; Minister for Ethnic Communities; Associate Minister of Education; Associate Minister of Health
13	Damien O'Connor	West Coast-Tasman	1993–2008; 2009–	Minister of Agriculture; Minister for Biosecurity; Minister for Food Safety; Minister for Rural Communities; Minister of State for Trade and Export Growth
14	Kris Faafoi	Mana	2010–	Minister of Broadcasting, Communications and Digital Media; Minister for Government Digital Services; Minister of Immigration; Minister of Commerce and Consumer Affairs; Associate Minister of Housing (Public Housing)
Ministers outside Cabinet
15	Peeni Henare	Tāmaki Makaurau	2014–	Minister of Civil Defence; Minister for Whānau Ora; Minister for Youth; Associate Minister of Health (Māori Health); Associate Minister of Tourism
16	Willie Jackson		1999–2002; 2017–	Minister of Employment; Associate Minister for ACC; Associate Minister for Māori Development
17	William Sio	Māngere	2008–	Minister for Pacific Peoples; Associate Minister for Courts; Associate Minister of Justice
18	Poto Williams	Christchurch East	2013–	Minister for the Community and Voluntary Sector; Associate Minister for Greater Christchurch Regeneration; Associate Minister of Immigration; Association Minister for Social Development
Members of Parliament
	Trevor Mallard		1984–1990; 1993–	Speaker of the House; Chair of the Business, Officers of Parliament, and Standing Orders Specialist Committees
	Adrian Rurawhe	Te Tai Hauauru	2014–	Assistant Speaker of the House
	Ruth Dyson	Port Hills	1993–	Assistant Speaker of the House; Chair of the Abortion Legislation Committee
	Michael Wood	Mount Roskill	2016–	Chief Government Whip
	Kieran McAnulty		2017–	Junior Whip
	Kiri Allan		2017–	Assistant Whip; Deputy Chair of the Primary Production Committee
	David Clark	Dunedin North	2011–	
	Clare Curran	Dunedin South	2008–	
	Meka Whaitiri	Ikaroa-Rawhiti	2013–	Chair of the Justice Committee
	Rino Tirikatene	Te Tai Tonga	2011–	Chair of the Māori Affairs Committee
	Louisa Wall	Manurewa	2008; 2011–	Chair of the Health Committee
	Raymond Huo		2008–14; 2017–	
	Priyanca Radhakrishnan		2017–	Deputy Chair of the Social Services and Community Committee
	Jan Tinetti		2017–	Deputy Chair of the Education and Workforce Committee
	Willow-Jean Prime		2017–	
	Ginny Andersen		2017–	Deputy Chair of the Governance and Administration Committee
	Jo Luxton		2017–	Deputy Chair of the Regulations Review Specialist Committee
	Deborah Russell	New Lynn	2017–	Chair of the Finance and Expenditure Committee
	Liz Craig		2017–	
	Marja Lubeck		2017–	
	Paul Eagle	Rongotai	2017–	
	Tāmati Coffey	Waiariki	2017–	Deputy Chair of the Economic Development, Science and Innovation Committee
	Jamie Strange		2017–	
	Anahila Kanongata'a-Suisuiki		2017–	
	Angie Warren-Clark		2017–	
	Greg O'Connor	Ohariu	2017–	
	Duncan Webb	Christchurch Central	2017–	Chair of the Environment Committee
	Iain Lees-Galloway	Palmerston North	2008–	

New Zealand First (9)
Rank	Name	Electorate (list if blank)	Term in office	Portfolios & Responsibilities
Ministers in Cabinet
1	Winston Peters		1979–1981; 1984–2008; 2011–	Deputy Prime Minister; Leader of New Zealand First; Minister of Foreign Affairs; Minister for Disarmament and Arms Control; Minister for State-Owned Enterprises; Minister of Racing; NZ First spokesperson for: Finance; Government Communication Security; Security Issues (GCSB)
2	Ron Mark		1996–2008; 2014–	Minister of Defence; Minister for Veterans; NZ First spokesperson for: Housing; Local Government; RMA
3	Tracey Martin		2011–	Minister for Children; Minister of Internal Affairs; Minister for Seniors; Associate Minister of Education; NZ First spokesperson for: Community and Volunteer; Disability Issues; Ethnic Affairs; Family Issues; Women's Affairs
8	Shane Jones		2005–2014; 2017–	Minister of Forestry; Minister for Infrastructure; Minister for Regional Economic Development; Associate Minister of Finance; Associate Minister for State Owned Enterprises; Associate Minister of Transport; NZ First spokesperson for: Building and Construction; Economic Development; Fisheries; Maori Affairs; Pacific Island Affairs; Treaty Settlements/ Treaty of Waitangi
Parliamentary Under-Secretaries
4	Fletcher Tabuteau		2014–	Deputy Leader of New Zealand First; Under-Secretary to the Minister for Regional Economic Development; Under-Secretary to the Minister for Disarmament and Arms Control; Under-Secretary to the Minister of Foreign Affairs; Deputy Chair of the Finance and Expenditure Committee; NZ First spokesperson for: Commerce; Energy; Finance (associate spokesperson); Insurance; Revenue; Superannuation; Tourism
Members of Parliament
5	Darroch Ball		2014–	Chair of the Transport and Infrastructure Committee; NZ First spokesperson for: Constitutional and Electoral Matters; Corrections; Crown Legal Services; Justice Courts; Police; Serious Fraud; Social Housing; Social Services; Youth Affairs
6	Clayton Mitchell		2014–	Party Whip; NZ First spokesperson for: Climate Changes; Consumer Affairs; Immigration; Labour and Industrial Relations; Outdoor Recreation; Parliamentary and Legislative Services; Research and Development/ Science and Innovation; Small Business; Sport and Recreation; Statistics
7	Mark Patterson		2017–	NZ First spokesperson for: Agriculture and Primary Industry; Bio-Security; Christchurch EQ Recovery; Crown Minerals; Customs; Food Safety; Intellectual Property; Land Information
9	Jenny Marcroft		2017–	NZ First spokesperson for: ACC; Arts, Culture and Heritage; Broadcasting; Communication IT; Conservation; Environment; Health; Human Rights

Green Party of Aotearoa New Zealand (8)
Rank	Name	Electorate (list if blank)	Term in office	Portfolios & Responsibilities
Ministers outside Cabinet
1	James Shaw		2014–	Male Co-leader of the Green Party; Minister for Climate Change; Minister of Statistics; Associate Minister of Finance; Green spokesperson for; Climate Change; Finance (Revenue, SOEs); Statistics
3	Julie Anne Genter		2011–	Minister for Women; Associate Minister of Health; Associate Minister of Transport; Green spokesperson for; Auckland Issues; Health; Transport; Urban Development; Women
4	Eugenie Sage		2011–	Minister of Conservation; Minister for Land Information; Associate Minister for the Environment; Green spokesperson for; Christchurch Issues; Civil Defence; Environment (Water Policy); Internal Affairs; Land Information
Parliamentary Under-Secretaries
6	Jan Logie		2011–	Under-Secretary to the Minister of Justice (Domestic and Sexual Violence Issues); Green spokesperson for; ACC; Community and Voluntary Sector; Rainbow Issues; Senior Citizens; Social Development; State Services; Superannuation; Te Tiriti o Waitangi; Workplace Relations and Safety
Members of Parliament
2	Marama Davidson		2015–	Female Co-leader of the Green Party; Deputy Chair of the Māori Affairs Committee; Green spokesperson for; Children; Economic Development (Regional Development, Employment); Ethnic Communities; Housing; Māori Development; Pacific Peoples; Rural Communities; Sports and Recreation; Water
5	Gareth Hughes		2010–	Chair of the Social Services and Community Committee; Green spokesperson for; Animal Welfare; Biosecurity; Commerce and Consumer Affairs; Energy and Resources; Food Safety; ICT; Primary Industries; Technology, Research and Development and Science; Tourism; Wellington Issues
7	Chlöe Swarbrick		2017–	Musterer; Green spokesperson for; Arts, Culture and Heritage; Broadcasting; Drug Law Reform; Education; Local Government; Mental Health; Open and Accessible Government; Small Business; Tertiary Education; Youth
8	Golriz Ghahraman		2017–	Green spokesperson for; Corrections; Courts; Customs; Defence, Security and Intelligence; Disability; Global Affairs; Human Rights; Immigration; Justice (including Electoral Issues); Overseas Development Aid; Police; Trade

National (54)
Rank	Name	Electorate (list if blank)	Term in office	Portfolios & Responsibilities
1	Judith Collins	Papakura	2002–	Leader of the National Party; Leader of the Opposition; Spokesperson for National Security and Intelligence
2	Gerry Brownlee	Ilam	1996–	Deputy Leader of the National Party; Deputy Chair of the Privileges Specialist Committee; Spokesperson for the GCSB; Spokesperson for the NZSIS; Spokesperson for COVID-19 Border Response
3	Paul Goldsmith		2011–	Spokesperson for Finance; Spokesperson for the Earthquake Commission
4	Simon Bridges	Tauranga	2008–	Spokesperson for Foreign Affairs; Spokesperson for Justice
5	Shane Reti	Whangarei	2014–	Deputy Chair of the Health Committee; Spokesperson for Health
6	Todd McClay	Rotorua	2008–	Spokesperson for Economic Development; Spokesperson for Tourism
7	Chris Bishop	Hutt South	2014–	Deputy Chair of the Transport and Infrastructure Committee; Spokesperson for Infrastructure; Spokesperson for Transport; Shadow Leader of the House
8	Todd Muller	Bay of Plenty	2014–	Spokesperson for Trade
9	Louise Upston	Taupo	2008–	Spokesperson for Social Development; Spokesperson for Social Investment
10	Scott Simpson	Coromandel	2011–	Deputy Chair of the Environment Committee; Spokesperson for the Environment; Spokesperson for Climate Change; Spokesperson for Planning (RMA Reform)
11	David Bennett	Hamilton East	2005–	Spokesperson for Agriculture
12	Michael Woodhouse		2008–	Spokesperson for Regional Economic Development; Spokesperson for Pike River Mine re-entry; Deputy Shadow Leader of the House
13	Nicola Willis		2018–	Spokesperson for Education; Spokesperson for Early Childhood Education
14	Jacqui Dean	Waitaki	2005–	Spokesperson for Housing and Urban Development; Spokesperson for Conservation
15	Mark Mitchell	Rodney	2011–	Spokesperson for Defence and Disarmament; Spokesperson for Sport and Recreation
16	Melissa Lee		2008–	Spokesperson for Broadcasting, Communications and Digital Media; Spokesperson for Data and Cyber-security
17	Andrew Bayly	Hunua	2014–	Spokesperson for Revenue; Spokesperson for Commerce; Spokesperson for State Owned Enterprises; Spokesperson for Small Business and Manufacturing; Associate Spokesperson for Finance
18	Nick Smith	Nelson	1990–	Father of the House; Deputy Chair of the Justice Committee; Spokesperson for State Services; Spokesperson for Electoral Law Reform; Spokesperson for Drug Reform
19	Alfred Ngaro		2011–	Spokesperson for Pacific Peoples; Spokesperson for the Community and Voluntary Sector; Spokesperson for Children; Spokesperson for Disability Issues
20	Barbara Kuriger	Taranaki-King Country	2014–	Senior Whip; Chair of the Primary Production Committee; Spokesperson for Food Safety; Spokesperson for Rural Communities; Spokesperson for Women; Associate Spokesperson for Agriculture
21	Harete Hipango	Whanganui	2017–	Shadow Attorney-General; Spokesperson for Crown Māori Relations; Spokesperson for Treaty of Waitangi Negotiations; Spokesperson for Māori Tourism
22	Jonathan Young	New Plymouth	2008–	Chair of the Economic Development, Science and Innovation Committee; Spokesperson for Energy and Resources; Spokesperson for Arts, Culture and Heritage
23	Tim Macindoe	Hamilton West	2008–	Spokesperson for ACC; Spokesperson for Skills and Employment; Spokesperson for Seniors; Spokesperson for Civil Defence
24	Kanwaljit Singh Bakshi		2008–	Spokesperson for Ethnic Communities; Associate Spokesperson for Justice
25	Matt Doocey	Waimakariri	2014–	Junior Whip; Spokesperson for Mental Health
26	Stuart Smith	Kaikōura	2014–	Spokesperson for Immigration; Spokesperson for Viticulture
27	Simon O'Connor	Tāmaki	2011–	Chair of the Foreign Affairs, Defence and Trade Committee; Spokesperson for Customs; Associate Spokesperson for Social Development; Associate Spokesperson for Housing and Urban Development (Social Housing)
28	Lawrence Yule	Tukituki	2017–	Spokesperson for Local Government
29	Denise Lee	Maungakiekie	2017–	Spokesperson for Local Government (Auckland)
30	Parmjeet Parmar		2014–	Chair of the Education and Workforce Committee; Spokesperson for Research, Science and Innovation; Spokesperson for Statistics
31	Brett Hudson		2014–	Spokesperson for Police; Spokesperson for Government Digital Services
32	Simeon Brown	Pakuranga	2017–	Spokesperson for Corrections; Spokesperson for Tertiary Education; Spokesperson for Youth; Associate Spokesperson for Education; Associate Spokesperson for Drug Reform
33	Ian McKelvie	Rangitīkei	2011–	Spokesperson for Fisheries; Spokesperson for Racing; Spokesperson for Forestry
34	Jo Hayes		2014–	Spokesperson for Whānau Ora; Spokesperson for Māori Development
35	Matt King	Northland	2017–	Spokesperson for Regional Development (North Island); Association Spokesperson for Transport
36	Chris Penk	Helensville	2017–	Spokesperson for Courts; Spokesperson for Veterans
37	Erica Stanford	East Coast Bays	2017–	Spokesperson for Internal Affairs; Associate Spokesperson for the Environment; Associate Spokesperson for Conservation
38	Tim van de Molen	Waikato	2017–	Third Whip; Spokesperson for Building and Construction; Spokesperson for Biosecurity; Associate Spokesperson for Transport
39	Maureen Pugh		2016–2017; 2018–	Spokesperson for Consumer Affairs; Spokesperson for Regional Development (South Island); Spokespersonn for West Coast Issues
40	Dan Bidois	Northcote	2018–	Spokesperson for Workplace Relations & Safety
41	Agnes Loheni		2019–	Associate Spokesperson for Small Business; Associate Spokesperson for Pacific Peoples; Associate Spokesperson for Health
42	Paulo Garcia		2019–	Deputy Chair of the Foreign Affairs, Defence and Trade Committee; Spokesperson for Land Information
	Nikki Kaye	Auckland Central	2008–	
	Amy Adams	Selwyn	2008–	Deputy Chair of the Abortion Legislation Committee
	Anne Tolley	East Coast	1999–2002; 2005–	Deputy Speaker; Deputy Chair of the Officers of Parliament Specialist Committee
	Paula Bennett	Upper Harbour	2005–	
	David Carter		1994–	
	Nicky Wagner		2005–	
	Nathan Guy	Otaki	2005–	
	Maggie Barry	North Shore	2011–	
	Jian Yang		2011–	Chair of the Governance and Administration Committee
	Sarah Dowie	Invercargill	2014–	
	Alastair Scott	Wairarapa	2014–	Chair of the Regulations Review Specialist Committee
	Hamish Walker	Clutha-Southland	2017–	
Members of the National caucus who resigned during the term of the 52nd Parliament
	Bill English		1990–2018	Resigned March 2018
	Steven Joyce		2008–2018	Resigned April 2018
	Jonathan Coleman	Northcote	2005–2018	Resigned April 2018
	Chris Finlayson		2005–2019	Resigned January 2019
	Nuk Korako		2014–2019	Resigned May 2019
	Andrew Falloon	Rangitata	2017–2020	Resigned July 2020

ACT New Zealand (1)
Rank	Name	Electorate (list if blank)	Term in office	Portfolios & Responsibilities
1	David Seymour	Epsom	2014–	Leader of ACT New Zealand

Independent (1)
Name	Electorate (list if blank)	Term in office	Portfolios & Responsibilities
Jami-Lee Ross	Botany	2011–	

=== Changes ===
The following changes in Members of Parliament occurred during the term of the 52nd Parliament:

#	Seat	Incumbent				Replacement			
#	Seat	Party	Name	Date vacated	Reason	Party	Name	Date elected	Change
1.	List	National	Bill English	13 March 2018	Resigned	National	Maureen Pugh	20 March 2018	List
2.	List	National	Steven Joyce	2 April 2018	Resigned	National	Nicola Willis	3 April 2018	List
3.	Northcote	National	Jonathan Coleman	15 April 2018	Resigned	National	Dan Bidois	9 June 2018	National hold (By-election)
4.	Botany	National	Jami-Lee Ross	19 October 2018	Resigned from the National Party	Independent	Jami-Lee Ross	19 October 2018	Independent gain
5.	List	National	Chris Finlayson	30 January 2019	Resigned	National	Agnes Loheni	31 January 2019	List
6.	List	National	Nuk Korako	16 May 2019	Resigned	National	Paulo Garcia	16 May 2019	List
7.	Rangitata	National	Andrew Falloon	21 July 2020	Resigned	N/A (Note: The resignation of Andrew Falloon took place less than six months before the next general election and therefore a by-election to fill the vacancy was not required.)			

== Seating plan ==
The chamber is in a horseshoe-shape.

=== Start of term ===
													Hipango	King	D. Lee	Walker
Tolley	Carter	Dean	D. Bennett	Macindoe	Simpson	Doocey	Bakshi	M. Lee	Dowie	Hudson	Korako	Muller	Parmar	Reti		Penk	Yule
Barry	N. Smith	Kuriger	Ross	Goldsmith	Upston	Ngaro	Mitchell	Wagner	Young	Hayes	McKelvie	S. O'Connor	Yang		Scott	Stanford
Finlayson	Coleman	P. Bennett	English	Joyce	Brownlee	Bridges	Adams	Collins	Woodhouse	Guy	Kaye	McClay		Bayly	S. Smith	van de Molen	Webb
													Seymour	Bishop	Brown
Mallard															Falloon
Mallard															Logie
													Davidson	Genter	Sage
Martin	Mark	Peters	ARDERN	Davis	Robertson	Hipkins	Twyford	Woods	Little	Sepuloni	Clark	Shaw		Hughes	Luxton	Ghahraman	G. O'Connor
Tabuteau	Jones	Mitchell	Dyson	Rurawhe	Parker	Mahuta	Nash	Lees-Galloway	Salesa	D. O'Connor	Curran	Wall	Huo		Andersen	Swarbrick	Warren-Clark
Marcroft	Patterson	Ball	Faafoi	Henare	Jackson	Sio	Whaitiri	Wood	Williams	Tirikatene	Radhakrishnan	Tinetti	Prime	Allan	Lubeck	Eagle	McAnulty
													Russell	Craig	Coffey	Strange	Kanongata'a-Suisuiki

=== End of term ===
													Guy	Wagner	Dowie	Vacant
Tolley	Carter	Young	Macindoe	Bakshi	S. Smith	S. O'Connor	Yule	D. Lee	van de Molen	King	Penk	Stanford	Pugh	Bidois		Scott	Ross
Hipango	Ngaro	Doocey	Kuriger	Dean	Mitchell	M. Lee	Bayly	N. Smith	Parmar	Hudson	Brown	McKelvie	Hayes		Loheni	Yang
Upston	Muller	Brownlee	Collins	Goldsmith	Bridges	Reti	McClay	Bishop	Simpson	D. Bennett	Woodhouse	Willis		P. Bennett	Garcia	Walker	Webb
													Seymour	Kaye	Adams
Mallard															Barry
Mallard															Logie
													Davidson	Sage	Hughes
Martin	Mark	Peters	ARDERN	Davis	Robertson	Hipkins	Twyford	Woods	Little	Sepuloni	Parker	Shaw		Genter	Kanongata'a-Suisuiki	Ghahraman	G. O'Connor
Tabuteau	Jones	Mitchell	Wood	McAnulty	Mahuta	Nash	Lees-Galloway	Salesa	D. O'Connor	Clark	Curran	Wall	Huo		Eagle	Swarbrick	Warren-Clark
Marcroft	Patterson	Ball	Allan	Faafoi	Henare	Jackson	Sio	Williams	Dyson	Rurawhe	Whaitiri	Tirikatene	Radhakrishnan	Tinetti	Luxton	Russell	Strange
													Prime	Andersen	Craig	Lubeck	Coffey

== Committees ==
The 52nd Parliament has 12 select committees and 7 specialist committees. They are listed below, with their chairpersons and deputy chairpersons:

Committee	Chairperson	Deputy chairperson	Government–Opposition divide
Select committees
Economic Development, Science and Innovation Committee	Jonathan Young (National)	Tāmati Coffey (Labour)	5–5
Education and Workforce Committee	Parmjeet Parmar (National)	Jan Tinetti (Labour)	6–5
Environment Committee	Duncan Webb (Labour)	Scott Simpson (National)	5–4
Finance and Expenditure Committee	Deborah Russell (Labour)	Fletcher Tabuteau (NZ First)	7–6
Foreign Affairs, Defence and Trade Committee	Simon O'Connor (National)	Paulo Garcia (National)	4–4
Governance and Administration Committee	Jian Yang (National)	Ginny Andersen (Labour)	4–4
Health Committee	Louisa Wall (Labour)	Shane Reti (National)	4–4
Justice Committee	Hon Meka Whaitiri (Labour)	Hon Nick Smith (National)	4–4
Māori Affairs Committee	Rino Tirikatene (Labour)	Marama Davidson (Green Party)	4–4
Primary Production Committee	Barbara Kuriger (National)	Kiri Allan (Labour)	4–4
Social Services and Community Committee	Gareth Hughes (Green Party)	Priyanca Radhakrishnan (Labour)	5–4
Transport and Infrastructure Committee	Darroch Ball (NZ First)	Chris Bishop (National)	5–4
Specialist committees
Abortion Legislation Committee	Hon Ruth Dyson (Labour)	Hon Amy Adams (National)	4–3
Business Committee	Rt Hon Trevor Mallard (Labour)	none	7–5
Intelligence and Security Committee	Rt Hon Jacinda Ardern (Labour)	none	4–3
Officers of Parliament Committee	Rt Hon Trevor Mallard (Labour)	Hon Anne Tolley (National)	4–2
Privileges Committee	Hon David Parker (Labour)	Hon Gerry Brownlee (National)	5–5
Regulations Review Committee	Alastair Scott (National)	Jo Luxton (Labour)	3–3
Standing Orders Committee	Rt Hon Trevor Mallard (Labour)	none	5–6

== Electorates ==
New Zealand electorates used during the term of the 52nd Parliament, showing 2017 election results

This section shows New Zealand electorates as they were represented at the end of the 52nd Parliament.

=== General electorates ===
Electorate	Region(s)	MP	Party
Auckland Central	Auckland (Central)	Nikki Kaye	National
Bay of Plenty	Bay of Plenty	Todd Muller	National
Botany	Auckland (East)	Jami-Lee Ross	Independent
Christchurch Central	Canterbury	Duncan Webb	Labour
Christchurch East	Canterbury	Poto Williams	Labour
Clutha-Southland	Southland; Otago	Hamish Walker	National
Coromandel	Waikato	Scott Simpson	National
Dunedin North	Otago	David Clark	Labour
Dunedin South	Otago	Clare Curran	Labour
East Coast	Gisborne; Bay of Plenty	Anne Tolley	National
East Coast Bays	Auckland (North)	Erica Stanford	National
Epsom	Auckland (Central)	David Seymour	ACT
Hamilton East	Waikato	David Bennett	National
Hamilton West	Waikato	Tim Macindoe	National
Helensville	Auckland (West)	Chris Penk	National
Hunua	Auckland (South)	Andrew Bayly	National
Hutt South	Wellington	Chris Bishop	National
Ilam	Canterbury	Gerry Brownlee	National
Invercargill	Southland	Sarah Dowie	National
Kaikōura	Marlborough; Canterbury	Stuart Smith	National
Kelston	Auckland (West)	Carmel Sepuloni	Labour
Mana	Wellington	Kris Faafoi	Labour
Māngere	Auckland (South)	William Sio	Labour
Manukau East	Auckland (South)	Jenny Salesa	Labour
Manurewa	Auckland (South)	Louisa Wall	Labour
Maungakiekie	Auckland (Central)	Denise Lee	National
Mt Albert	Auckland (Central)	Jacinda Ardern	Labour
Mt Roskill	Auckland (Central)	Michael Wood	Labour
Napier	Hawke's Bay	Stuart Nash	Labour
Nelson	Nelson; Tasman	Nick Smith	National
New Lynn	Auckland (West)	Deborah Russell	Labour
New Plymouth	Taranaki	Jonathan Young	National
North Shore	Auckland (North)	Maggie Barry	National
Northcote	Auckland (North)	Dan Bidois	National
Northland	Northland	Matt King	National
Ōhariu	Wellington	Greg O'Connor	Labour
Ōtaki	Wellington; Manawatū-Whanganui	Nathan Guy	National
Pakuranga	Auckland (East)	Simeon Brown	National
Palmerston North	Manawatū-Whanganui	Iain Lees-Galloway	Labour
Papakura	Auckland (South)	Judith Collins	National
Port Hills	Canterbury	Ruth Dyson	Labour
Rangitata	Canterbury	Vacant	Vacant
Rangitīkei	Manawatū-Whanganui	Ian McKelvie	National
Rimutaka	Wellington	Chris Hipkins	Labour
Rodney	Auckland (North)	Mark Mitchell	National
Rongotai	Wellington; Chatham Islands	Paul Eagle	Labour
Rotorua	Bay of Plenty	Todd McClay	National
Selwyn	Canterbury	Amy Adams	National
Tāmaki	Auckland (Central)	Simon O'Connor	National
Taranaki-King Country	Taranaki; Waikato	Barbara Kuriger	National
Taupō	Waikato	Louise Upston	National
Tauranga	Bay of Plenty	Simon Bridges	National
Te Atatū	Auckland (West)	Phil Twyford	Labour
Tukituki	Hawke's Bay	Lawrence Yule	National
Upper Harbour	Auckland (North)	Paula Bennett	National
Waikato	Waikato	Tim van de Molen	National
Waimakariri	Canterbury	Matt Doocey	National
Wairarapa	Wellington; Manawatū-Whanganui	Alastair Scott	National
Waitaki	Otago; Canterbury	Jacqui Dean	National
Wellington Central	Wellington	Grant Robertson	Labour
West Coast-Tasman	West Coast; Tasman	Damien O'Connor	Labour
Whanganui	Manawatū-Whanganui; Taranaki	Harete Hipango	National
Whangarei	Northland	Shane Reti	National
Wigram	Canterbury	Megan Woods	Labour

=== Māori electorates ===
Electorate	Regions	MP	Party
Hauraki-Waikato	Waikato; Auckland	Nanaia Mahuta	Labour
Ikaroa-Rāwhiti	Hawke's Bay; Gisborne; Manawatū-Whanganui; Wellington	Meka Whaitiri	Labour
Tāmaki Makaurau	Auckland	Peeni Henare	Labour
Te Tai Hauāuru	Taranaki; Waikato; Manawatū-Whanganui; Wellington	Adrian Rurawhe	Labour
Te Tai Tokerau	Northland; Auckland	Kelvin Davis	Labour
Te Tai Tonga	South Island; Wellington; Chatham Islands	Rino Tirikatene	Labour
Waiariki	Bay of Plenty; Waikato	Tāmati Coffey	Labour

== See also ==
Terms of the
New Zealand Parliament

1st | 2nd | 3rd | 4th | 5th
6th | 7th | 8th | 9th | 10th
11th | 12th | 13th | 14th | 15th
16th | 17th | 18th | 19th | 20th
21st | 22nd | 23rd | 24th | 25th
26th | 27th | 28th | 29th | 30th
31st | 32nd | 33rd | 34th | 35th
36th | 37th | 38th | 39th | 40th
41st | 42nd | 43rd | 44th | 45th
46th | 47th | 48th | 49th | 50th
51st | 52nd | 53rd | 54th | 55th

- Opinion polling for the 2017 New Zealand general election
- Politics of New Zealand
- New Zealand House of Representatives committees
