= 2016 New Zealand National Party leadership election =

- 12 December 2016
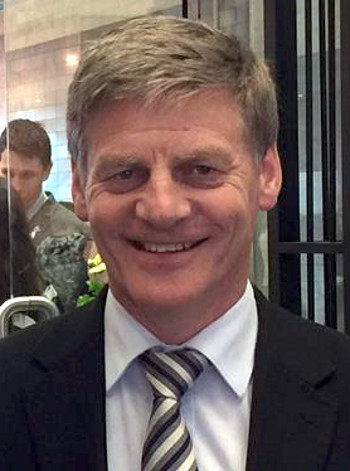

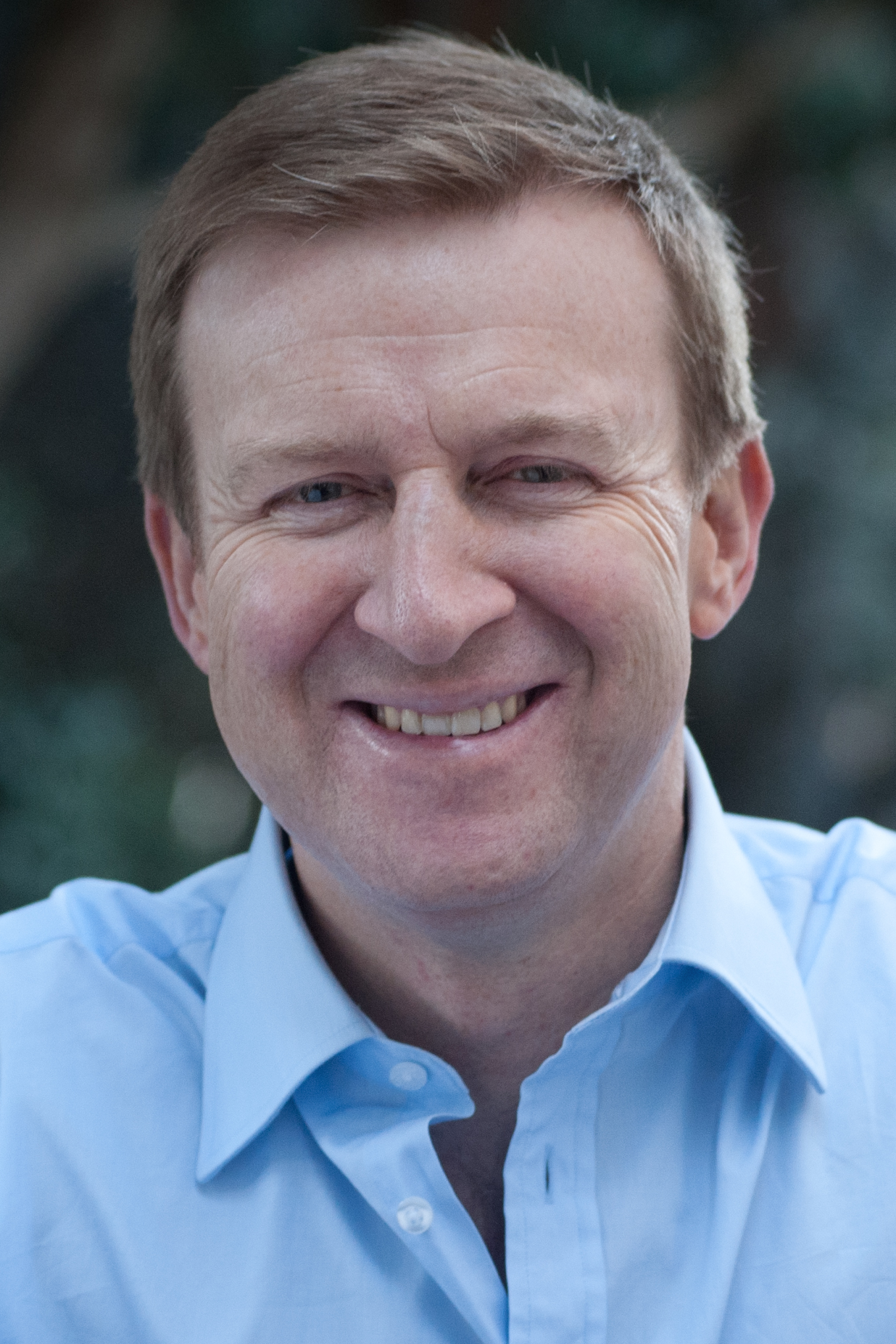

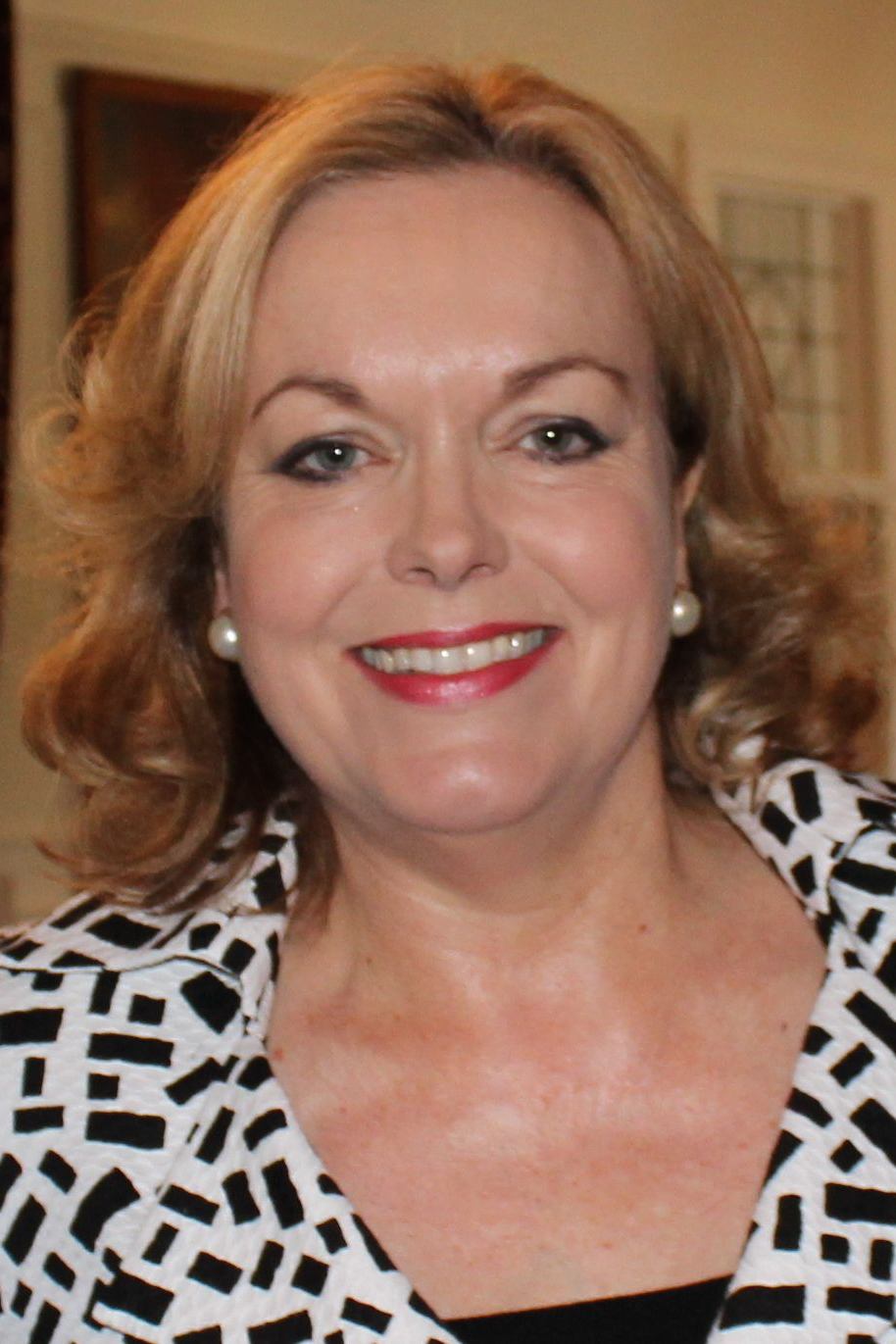
Candidate	Bill English	Jonathan Coleman	Judith Collins
Leader's seat	List	Northcote	Papakura
Popular vote	Unopposed	Withdrew	Withdrew
Leader before election
John Key
Leader after election
Bill English

The 2016 New Zealand National Party leadership election was held on 12 December 2016 to determine the next Leader of the National Party and the 39th Prime Minister of New Zealand. A secret exhaustive ballot of the 59-member National parliamentary caucus was to be used in the event of a contested leadership.

The election followed the resignation announcement of Prime Minister and parliamentary leader John Key on 5 December 2016. Deputy Prime Minister Bill English became the sole candidate and was elected, following the 8 December withdrawal of Police Minister Judith Collins and Health Minister Jonathan Coleman. Paula Bennett was appointed as the new deputy leader, replacing English in this position.

== Background ==
John Key became National Party leader in 2006, as a second term electorate MP for Helensville. Following two years as Leader of the Opposition, Key led his party to victory in the 2008 general election, forming the Fifth National Government of New Zealand, and repeated this feat in both the 2011 and 2014 general elections. At the time of his resignation in late 2016, National had enjoyed a sustained period of strong polling leading up to the 2017 general election.

== Candidates ==
=== Bill English ===
During his resignation announcement on 5 December 2016 Key conditionally endorsed Deputy Prime Minister, Minister of Finance, and National Party deputy leader Bill English. English also received the backing of each of the parliamentary leaders of National's three parliamentary support partners: ACT, United Future and the Māori Party. English announced his candidacy the following day. English, a ninth-term MP, had served as the 9th leader of the National Party, but was replaced by Don Brash following defeat in the 2002 general election. English was first elected to Parliament in 1990 as the MP for Wallace; following the 1996 boundary changes with the introduction of MMP, he was re-elected as MP for Clutha-Southland electorate. He retired as an electorate MP at the 2014 general election, deciding to contest the party list only. English also held ministerial portfolios of Health, Treasury, Revenue, Infrastructure, Housing New Zealand, Crown Health Enterprises, Government Superannuation Fund, and Regulatory Reform during the fourth and fifth National governments.

== Withdrawn candidates ==
=== Jonathan Coleman ===
Minister of Health and Minister for Sport and Recreation Dr Jonathan Coleman announced his candidacy on 6 December 2016. Coleman was first elected to Parliament in 2005 as the MP for Northcote. He also held ministerial positions for Defence, Immigration, State Services and Broadcasting during the fifth National government. Coleman conceded to English on 8 December 2016, after English secured public endorsements from more than half of caucus members.

=== Judith Collins ===
Minister of Police and Minister of Corrections Judith Collins announced her candidacy on 6 December 2016. Collins was elected to Parliament in 2002 as the MP for Clevedon; after the 2007 boundary changes, she was re-elected MP for Papakura in 2008 where she remains MP. She previously held ministerial positions for Justice, ACC, Veterans' Affairs and Ethnic Affairs in the fifth National government. Collins had been the highest ranked woman in Key's Cabinet, but resigned from her ministerial portfolios in 2014 following allegations of undermining the head of the Serious Fraud Office. However, she was later cleared following an inquiry and was restored to Cabinet in 2015. Collins withdrew her candidacy and endorsed English on 8 December 2016.

== Caucus endorsements ==
=== Bill English ===
- Amy Adams
- Todd Barclay
- Paula Bennett
- Chris Bishop
- Chester Borrows
- Simon Bridges
- Judith Collins
- Jacqui Dean
- Bill English
- Christopher Finlayson
- Craig Foss
- Paul Foster-Bell
- Paul Goldsmith
- Nathan Guy
- Jo Hayes
- Brett Hudson
- Steven Joyce
- Nikki Kaye
- John Key
- Nuk Korako
- Barbara Kuriger
- Mark Mitchell
- Todd McClay
- Murray McCully
- Todd Muller
- Jono Naylor
- Alfred Ngaro
- Hekia Parata
- Jami-Lee Ross
- Nick Smith
- Anne Tolley
- Michael Woodhouse
- Louise Upston
- Jonathan Young

=== Undeclared ===
- Kanwaljit Singh Bakshi
- Maggie Barry
- Andrew Bayly
- David Bennett
- Gerry Brownlee
- David Carter
- Jonathan Coleman
- Matt Doocey
- Sarah Dowie
- Jo Goodhew
- Melissa Lee
- Sam Lotu-Iiga
- Tim Macindoe
- Ian McKelvie
- Simon O'Connor
- Parmjeet Parmar
- Maureen Pugh
- Shane Reti
- Alastair Scott
- Scott Simpson
- Stuart Smith
- Lindsay Tisch
- Nicky Wagner
- Maurice Williamson
- Jian Yang

== Public opinion polling ==
Date	Polling organisation	Sample size	Bill English	Judith Collins	Jonathan Coleman	Steven Joyce	Paula Bennett	Amy Adams
5 December 2016	Nielsen Research	1,016	37%	4%	0%	6%	4%	3%
5 December 2016	UMR Research	–	21%	6%	–	16%	11%	–
