= 2018 Northcote by-election =

New Zealand by-election

- 9 June 2018

Northcote constituency of the House of Representatives
- Turnout: 20,850 (43.59%)
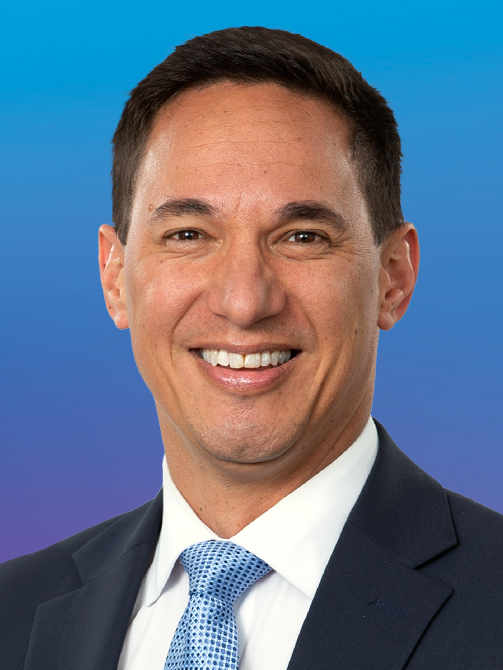

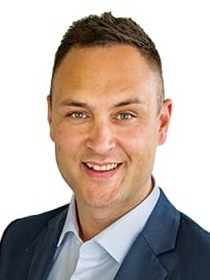
| | First party | Second party |
|---|---|---|
| Candidate | Dan Bidois | Shanan Halbert |
| Party | National | Labour |
| Popular vote | 10,566 | 9,256 |
| Percentage | 50.67% | 44.39% |
| Swing | ▼1.60 | ▲9.14 |
- Bidois: 50–60% Halbert: 40–50% 60–70% No polling places
MP before election
Jonathan Coleman
National
Elected MP
Dan Bidois
National

The 2018 Northcote by-election was a New Zealand by-election that was held in Northcote on 9 June 2018. The seat became vacant on 15 April 2018, following the resignation of then-Member for Northcote Jonathan Coleman, a member of the New Zealand National Party.

National Party candidate Dan Bidois retained the seat for National, but with a significantly reduced majority blamed on low voter turnout; it was therefore described as a victory for the National Party Leader Simon Bridges.

== Background ==
The Northcote electorate is based around the southern and western suburbs of Auckland's North Shore. In addition to the eponymous Northcote, there are Birkenhead, Birkdale, Beach Haven and the southern end of Glenfield. It was created ahead of the change to mixed-member proportional (MMP) voting in 1996 by merging the seat of Birkenhead with most of the old Glenfield electorate. A small boundary adjustment was done prior to the 1999 election, but no further boundary adjustments were undertaken in the subsequent redistributions in 2002, 2007, and 2013/14.

Northcote continues the electoral habits of its predecessor seats; Birkenhead was a reasonably safe seat for the National Party, supplying it with Jim McLay, who led the party in the mid-1980s. In 1987, the seat that would provide National with a leader provided Labour with a gain, before swinging back into the blue column when Labour's fortunes thinned out at the 1990 election. Glenfield also followed this boom and bust model, being held by Labour Party Member Judy Keall through the duration of the fourth Labour government before the National Party landslide in 1990 claimed Keall as one of its victims.

=== Outgoing member ===
At the 2005 election, National Party's Jonathan Coleman secured the seat, defeating Labour's Ann Hartley. Coleman went on to be re-elected at the 2008, 2011, 2014 and 2017 elections. At the 2017 election, he secured a majority of 6,210. When National formed a government after the 2008 election, Coleman was appointed as Minister of Broadcasting and Minister of Immigration; after the 2011 election he was promoted to be Minister of Defence for the government's second term. Following the government's re-election in 2014, Coleman became Minister of Health—ultimately his most senior role—which he held until the government's defeat in the 2017 election. Coleman contested for the leadership of the National Party in the 2016 leadership election, which was won by Bill English.

On 22 March 2018, Coleman announced he would resign from Parliament, triggering the by-election. It was the first by-election of the 52nd Parliament. On 29 March, it was confirmed that his resignation would take effect at "midnight on 15 April 2018".

=== Election schedule ===
Key dates relating to the by-election were as follows:

| 22 March 2018 (Thursday) | Incumbent Member Jonathan Coleman announces his resignation. |
| 9 April 2018 (Monday) | Prime Minister Jacinda Ardern announces the by-election date as Saturday 9 June. |
| 7 May 2018 (Monday) | Writ day – Governor-General issues formal direction to the Electoral Commission to hold the by-election. Last day to ordinarily enrol to vote (late enrolments must cast special votes) |
| 15 May 2018 (Tuesday) | Deadline (12:00) for candidates to lodge nominations. Details of candidates for election and polling places released |
| 23 May 2018 (Wednesday) | Overseas voting begins |
| 28 May 2018 (Monday) | Advance voting begins |
| 8 June 2018 (Friday) | Advance voting ends; overseas voting ends at 16:00 local time. Last day to enrol to vote. |
| 9 June 2018 (Saturday) | Election day – polling places open 09:00 to 19:00; Preliminary results released progressively after 19:00 |
| 20 June 2018 (Wednesday) | Official results declared |
| 26 June 2018 (Tuesday) | Writ for election returned; official declaration of elected member (subject to judicial recounts) |

== Candidates ==
Labour's 2017 general election candidate Shanan Halbert stated his intention to contest his party's nomination again. On 10 April Labour released the three nomination candidates; Halbert, Paul McGreal and Auckland Councillor Richard Hills. Shanan Halbert was chosen as Labour's candidate.

Former Green Party candidate Vernon Tava confirmed he was seeking the National Party nomination. Tava, a member of the Waitematā Local Board, stood in Northcote for the Greens in 2011 and unsuccessfully contested the co-leadership in 2015. He later left the party believing the Greens were becoming "too socialist". Tava did not make National's shortlist. The five candidates who did were economist Dan Bidois, Kaipātiki Local Board chair Danielle Grant, Darren Ward, Upper Harbour Local Board member Lisa Whyte, and Simon Watts. Dan Bidois was selected as National's candidate.

Perennial candidate Peter Wakeman offered himself to the electorate, but later withdrew. After quitting he endorsed Democrats candidate Tricia Cheel.

The Green Party also decided to field a candidate in the by-election. Co-leader Marama Davidson said "The Northcote by-election is an opportunity for the Green Party to promote our early successes in Government while highlighting our points of difference". Rebekah Jaung was announced as the party's candidate on 11 May 2018.

New Zealand First announced that they would not contest the by-election. New Zealand First's candidate from 2017, Kym Koloni, decided to stand as an independent.

On 6 May 2018, ACT leader David Seymour announced that Stephen Berry was the party's candidate.

=== List of candidates ===
Nominated candidates
| Party | Candidate | Background |
|---|---|---|
| ACT | Stephen Berry | 2017 candidate for East Coast Bays, 5th on party list |
| National | Dan Bidois | Economist, 72nd on National's 2017 party list |
| Democrats | Tricia Cheel | Social justice campaigner, Democrats 2017 candidate for Northcote |
| Labour | Shanan Halbert | Head of Relationships at Te Wānanga o Aotearoa, Labour's 2017 candidate |
| Green | Rebekah Jaung | Doctor, Greens 2017 candidate for Northcote |
| Independent | Kym Koloni | Stood for NZ First in 2017 |
| Legalise Cannabis | Jeff Lye | Party co-leader, 2017 candidate for Kelston |
| Not A Party | Liam Walsh | Not A Prospect |

== Results ==
The following table shows final by-election results:

2018 Northcote by-election
Notes: Blue background denotes the winner of the by-election. Pink background denotes a candidate elected from their party list prior to the by-election. Yellow background denotes the winner of the by-election, who was a list MP prior to the by-election. A ✓ or ✗ denotes status of any incumbent, win or lose respectively.
| Party | Candidate | Votes | % | ±% |
|---|---|---|---|---|
| National | Dan Bidois | 10,566 | 50.67 | |
| Labour | Shanan Halbert | 9,256 | 44.39 | +9.14 |
| Green | Rebekah Jaung | 615 | 2.94 | −3.79 |
| ACT | Stephen Berry | 166 | 0.79 | |
| Independent | Kym Koloni | 97 | 0.46 | −3.27 |
| Legalise Cannabis | Jeff Lye | 89 | 0.42 | |
| Democrats | Tricia Cheel | 31 | 0.14 | −0.11 |
| Not A Party | Liam Walsh | 5 | 0.02 | |
| Informal votes | | 25 | 0.11 | |
| Majority | | 1,310 | 6.28 | |
| Turnout | | 20,850 | 43.59 | −33.98 |

== Aftermath ==
Bidois held the seat for two years before being defeated at the 2020 general election by Halbert.

Bidois regained the seat at the 2023 general election, recording a majority of 9,270 over Halbert.
