= Dan Bidois =

New Zealand politician (born 1983)

Dan Bidois MP
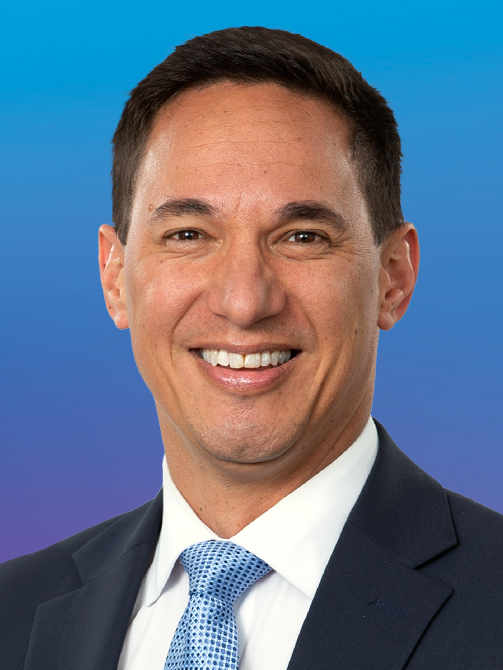
- Dan Bidois in 2023

Member of the New Zealand Parliament for Northcote
- Incumbent
- Assumed office 14 October 2023
- Preceded by: Shanan Halbert
- In office 9 June 2018 – 17 October 2020
- Preceded by: Jonathan Coleman
- Succeeded by: Shanan Halbert

Personal details
- Born: 24 February 1983 (age 43) Auckland, New Zealand
- Party: National
- Education: Harvard University; University of Auckland
- Profession: Economist
- Website: National Party profile

Daniel Michael Bidois (born 1983) is a New Zealand politician.

A member of the National Party, Bidois has been a Member of Parliament in the House of Representatives for Northcote since 2023. He previously represented that electorate from 2018 until 2020.

== Early life and education ==
Bidois is both of European and Māori descent. He affiliates to Ngāpuhi and Ngāti Manaiopoto. At the age of 9 months, he was adopted by Mike and Leah Bidois. Raised in Howick, he is the youngest of the four Bidois children. Bidois made contact with his birth mother for the first time on New Year's Eve, 2021.

Bidois attended Our Lady Star of the Sea Catholic Primary School, Howick Intermediate and Howick College, where he was a "child delinquent" twice suspended for stealing and for mooning his principal. He dropped out of school aged 15 to pursue a butchery apprenticeship. Two weeks into his apprenticeship, he was diagnosed with Ewing sarcoma, a rare form of bone cancer. After recovering from chemotherapy and surgery, he completed his training with Woolworths.

After completing a bridging course at Manukau Institute of Technology, Bidois trained as an economist at the University of Auckland, completing undergraduate degrees in arts and commerce in 2006 and a Bachelor of Commerce (Hons) in economics in 2007. He was president of the Auckland University Students' Association in 2006, having previously lost election to that position for the 2005 term.

In 2010, Bidois won a Fulbright Scholarship to attend Harvard University in the United States, completing a Master of Public Policy degree in 2012.

== Professional career ==
Bidois began his professional career as a management consultant with Deloitte New Zealand. In 2010, he joined thinktank The New Zealand Institute where he co-authored a report on the reallocation of resources for improved productivity. After completing postgraduate study at Harvard, Bidois worked for three years as an economist with the OECD in Paris, France, working on economic reforms in emerging markets. In 2015 he worked as an independent strategy consultant to the Malaysian government in Kuala Lumpur. He returned to New Zealand in 2016 and worked as a strategy manager for Foodstuffs.

== Member of Parliament ==
New Zealand Parliament
Years	Term	Electorate		Party
2018–2020	52nd	Northcote		National
2023–2026	54th	Northcote	60	National
2026–present	55th	Northcote	30	National

Bidois contested the National Party selection for Pakuranga upon the retirement of Maurice Williamson, but failed to win the candidacy. He stood as a list-only candidate in the 2017 general election, ranked 72.

On 22 March 2018, Northcote MP Jonathan Coleman announced his resignation from Parliament, triggering a by-election. Bidios was selected as National's candidate on 15 April. He defeated Labour Party candidate Shanan Halbert, winning 10,566 votes (50.67%). Bidois was sworn into the 52nd Parliament on 27 June 2018 and gave his maiden speech on 3 July. In that speech, he talked of strengthening an upwardly mobile society through "the power of free and competitive enterprise."

As an opposition MP, Bidois sat on the social services and community committee (2018–2019), the Māori affairs committee (2019–2020) and the education and workforce committee (2020). He was his party's associate spokesperson on workplace relations and safety (2018–2020). In this role he stated his view that there should not be trade unions in New Zealand. As Northcote MP, he advocated for dynamic traffic lanes to decrease congestion in his electorate.

At the 2020 general election, Bidois lost Northcote to Labour's Halbert by a final margin of 2,534 votes. At 43, he was ranked too low on National's list to return to Parliament as a list MP. After his election loss Bidois established his own consultancy before taking an engagement manager role with an Accenture subsidiary.

Bidois was re-selected as National's Northcote candidate for the 2023 New Zealand general election, where he defeated Halbert with a 9,270 vote majority. In the 54th New Zealand Parliament he was previously chair of the Māori affairs committee and is currently deputy chair of the transport and infrastructure committee and a member of the finance and expenditure committee. A member's bill in his name (previously in the name of Melissa Lee) passed its third reading on 11 September 2024, setting a minimum use period of three years for most gift cards.

During the 2026 New Zealand general election, Bidois contested the Northcote electorate for National. He was ranked 30th on the National Party list. On 7 November, Bidois retained the Northcote electorate by a margin of 3,064 votes based on preliminary results.

== Political views ==
Bidois voted against the End of Life Choice Act 2019, writing on Facebook he was concerned about safeguards, opposed to sending a conflicting message on suicide, and supportive of palliative care. He voted in favour of the Abortion Legislation Act 2020 which legalised abortion in New Zealand.

== Personal life ==
Bidois married Courtney Simpson in 2023. They have a son.

New Zealand Parliament
Preceded by Jonathan Coleman	Member for Northcote; 2018–2020; 2023–present	Succeeded by Shanan Halbert
Preceded by Shanan Halbert	Member for Northcote; 2018–2020; 2023–present	Incumbent
