= Darroch Ball =

New Zealand politician

President of New Zealand First
- Acting
- In office 20 December 2020 – 20 June 2021
- Leader: Winston Peters
- Preceded by: Kristin Campbell-Smith
- Succeeded by: Julian Paul

Member of the New Zealand Parliament for New Zealand First party list
- In office 20 September 2014 – 17 October 2020

Personal details
- Born: 1982 (age 43–44) Auckland, New Zealand
- Party: New Zealand First
- Children: 2
- Education: University of Auckland
- Profession: Soldier, teacher

Darroch Leicester Ball (born 1982) is a New Zealand politician of the New Zealand First party.

Ball was elected to the New Zealand House of Representatives at the 2014 general election and served as a Member of Parliament until his party's defeat in the 2020 general election. He was the party's interim president from December 2020 to July 2021 and is currently chief of staff to the New Zealand First leader, Winston Peters.

== Early life ==
Ball was born and raised in Auckland. He is of Tongan descent through his mother. He attended Liston College (1996–2000) in Henderson and became a father aged 19. He raised his two children as a single parent.

Ball graduated with a bachelor's degree majoring in biological science from the University of Auckland in 2005. He was an logistics officer in the New Zealand Army for seven years and trained as a teacher in 2013. He taught science at Waiopehu College in 2014 before his election to Parliament. He was previously on the board of trustees of Linton Camp School.

== Member of Parliament ==
New Zealand Parliament
Years	Term	Electorate	List	Party
2014–2017	51st	List	10	NZ First
2017–2020	52nd	List	5	NZ First

Ball joined New Zealand First at age 30. He was the NZ First electorate committee vice-chairman in Palmerston North while studying at Massey University and launched a campus branch of New Zealand First in September 2013. The next month, he was elected the party's vice-president for the North Island. He stood in the Palmerston North electorate in the 2014 election and was elected from the New Zealand First list, where he was ranked 10th.

In Ball's first term, New Zealand First was part of the opposition. He was the party spokesperson for civil defence and emergency issues, consumer affairs, research, science and technology, social services and youth affairs, and sat on the social services committee. He formed a close friendship with fellow New Zealand First MPs, Fletcher Tabuteau and Clayton Mitchell. Ball's members bill, the Youth Employment Training and Education Bill, was debated in Parliament in May 2017; proposing the establishment of a youth employment training and education programme within the Defence Force, it was defeated at its first reading with only the support of New Zealand First, Labour and the Māori Party.

In the 2017 general election, Ball contested Palmerston North again. He came third and was re-elected into Parliament on the New Zealand First party list. He continued as New Zealand First spokesperson for social services and youth affairs and gained responsibility as the spokesperson for social housing, justice, courts and police. He also chaired the transport and infrastructure committee. New Zealand First and Labour formed a coalition government; as justice spokesperson, Ball held conservative positions and was instrumental in denying the Labour Party support for several of its more progressive policies, including potential drug reform and a proposed "three strikes" legislation repeal bill. He led an attempt to require the Abortion Legislation Bill to succeed in a referendum to be enacted; it failed 19–100.

Ball introduced the Protection for First Responders and Prison Officers Bill in May 2018. The bill proposed that anyone who intentionally injures a first responder or prison officer commits an offence with a minimum sentence of six months of imprisonment. The bill will supported unanimously by members at its first reading but lost support as it progressed through later stages. Following its July 2020 second reading, National and Labour, unhappy with the bill's drafting, returned it to the justice committee for further consideration. After the 2020 general election, and after it was transferred to National Party MP Mark Mitchell, the bill was reconsidered by the House and discharged.

In the 2020 general election held on 17 October, Ball unsuccessfully contested Palmerston North, coming fifth. He and his fellow NZ First MPs lost their seats after the party's vote dropped to 2.6%, below the five percent threshold needed to enter Parliament.

== Later career ==
Two months after the election, NZ First president Kristin Campbell-Smith resigned, and Ball became the party's interim president, saying he expected to hold the role until the party's 2021 annual general meeting. Julian Paul was elected as the permanent president when the AGM was held in June 2021.

Ball put himself forward as a candidate in a by-election for a seat on the Palmerston North City Council in February 2021, but was unsuccessful, coming third.

In early January 2021, Ball became the co-leader of the victims advocacy group Sensible Sentencing Trust. As leader of the trust, Ball criticised the Green Party co-leader Marama Davidson for attending a function hosted by the Mongrel Mob gang. Ball became the sole leader of the trust in 2022 and it shut down under his leadership.

During the campaign for the 2023 New Zealand general election which restored Winston Peters and the New Zealand First Party to Parliament, Ball was a continuing presence with Peters, acting as his personal assistant and campaign manager. After the election, Ball became Peters' chief of staff, succeeding Jon Johansson.

Party political offices
Preceded by Kristin Campbell Smith	President of New Zealand First; Acting; 2020–2021	Succeeded by Julian Paul
