= Shanan Halbert =

New Zealand politician

Shanan Halbert MP
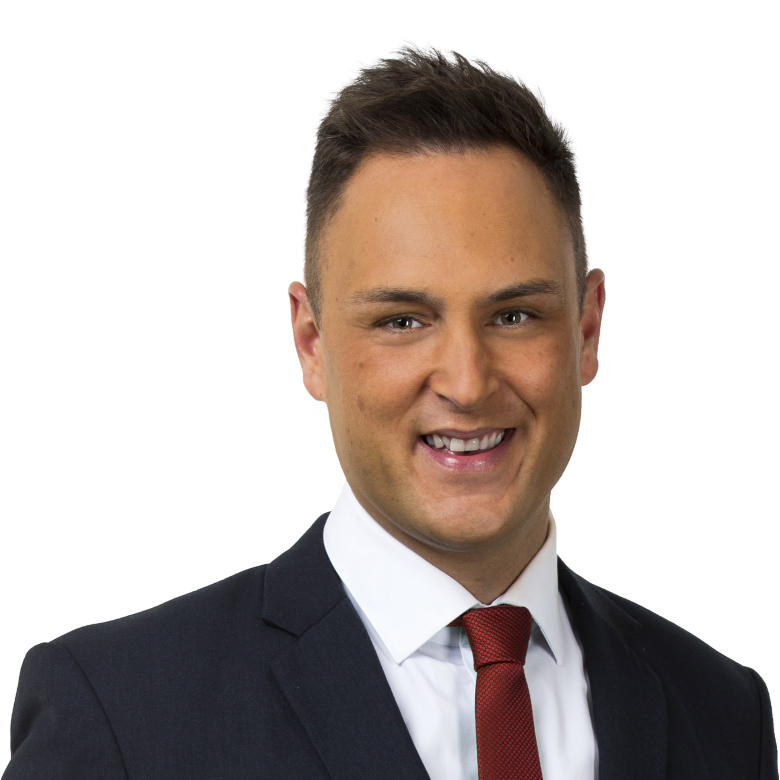
- Halbert in 2023

Member of the New Zealand Parliament for Labour Party list
- Incumbent
- Assumed office 7 February 2024
- Preceded by: Kelvin Davis (Note: Normally, list MPs do not have individual predecessors or successors, but Davis resigned during a sitting parliament and therefore was succeeded by Halbert.)

Member of the New Zealand Parliament for Northcote
- In office 17 October 2020 – 14 October 2023
- Preceded by: Dan Bidois
- Succeeded by: Dan Bidois

Personal details
- Born: 24 April 1982 (age 44) Napier, New Zealand
- Party: Labour

Shanan Kiritea Halbert (born 24 April 1982) is a New Zealand politician of the Labour Party. From 2020 to 2023, he was the Member of Parliament for Northcote. Having lost the Northcote seat in 2023, he was elected as a list member of parliament after the resignation of Kelvin Davis.

== Early life and career ==
Halbert has affiliation to Rongowhakaata and Ngāti Whitikaupeka through his father, while his mother is pākehā. He grew up in Napier, and moved to Auckland after graduating from high school. He has a BA in education and Māori from the University of Auckland and a certificate in Contemporary Performing Arts from AUT. He started, but did not complete, an MBA. Halbert has worked at Glenfield College, where he set up the Health Sciences Academy, and at Catholic college Hato Petera. He was the Head of Relationships at Te Wānanga o Aotearoa.

== Political career ==
New Zealand Parliament
Years	Term	Electorate		Party
2020–2023	53rd	Northcote	51	Labour
2024–2026	54th	List	28	Labour
2026–present	55th	List	19	Labour

=== Early political career ===
Halbert stood as a list-only candidate for Labour in the 2014 general election. His party list ranking of 48 was too low to win a seat. In the 2017 general election, he sought the Labour Party selection for the Auckland Central seat, losing to Helen White. He instead contested the Northcote electorate; he neither won the electorate nor won a list seat on his party list ranking of 51. In 2018, after the resignation of National MP Jonathan Coleman, Halbert again contested the Northcote by-election as Labour's candidate, having been chosen for the candidacy over Paul McGreal and Auckland Councillor Richard Hills. He was defeated by National's Dan Bidois.

=== First term, 2020–2023 ===
In the 2020 general election, Halbert was again ranked 51st on the Labour party list and contested the Northcote electorate. This time, Halbert won the seat from incumbent National MP Dan Bidois by 2534 votes.

Halbert has for years campaigned on improving public transport, as congestion in the Northcote electorate—located at the northern landing of the Auckland Harbour Bridge—is a defining issue for many voters. For the 2020 campaign, he also campaigned in support of local businesses and advocated for improved access to mental health services. His father died of lung cancer on election day.

Halbert faced criticism in both the 2020 and 2023 election campaigns for misleading advertising. In 2020, he published a flyer in which Labour claimed, “We’ve built over 600 houses for our growing Northcote family.” A complaint to the Advertising Standards Authority noted that only 74 homes had been built. Labour apologised for the flyer and pulled it from stalls. In 2023, another flyer from Halbert celebrates “1700 new warm, dry homes as part of the Northcote Development”, but these homes were not scheduled for completion until 2026. This flyer also faced a complaint to the Advertising Standards Authority, but the Authority dismissed it. An article by Tova O'Brien criticised the flyer for being unclear which points were prior actions by Labour and which were promises if re-elected. Halbert also stated on Facebook that the National Party plans to decrease sick leave to five days per year, which is not its policy.

In 21 September 2023, Halbert was the subject of bullying allegations by several former staff, who claimed he was manipulative, scheming, narcissistic, and intimidated them. Labour whips were first alerted to the allegations by a bullying and harassment coach in August 2022 but no action was taken since staff wished to remain anonymous. In response to the bullying allegations, Halbert said that he had a good relationship with parliamentary and other staff, while acknowledging he had encountered employment issues but had done his best to resolve them professionally. Halbert urged disaffected staff members to engage with Parliament's complaint process. During an election debate in Northcote, Halbert denied the bullying allegations and claimed he had not received any complaints when confronted by Newshub journalists.

=== Second term, 2024–2026 ===
During the 2023 New Zealand general election, Halbert was unseated by National candidate Bidois, who won by a margin of 9,270 votes.

In early February 2024, the simultaneous resignations of both Labour MPs Kelvin Davis and Rino Tirikatene allowed Halbert and Tracey McLellan to reenter Parliament on the Labour Party list. During a shadow cabinet reshuffle triggered by the resignation of Grant Robertson, Halbert assumed the Auckland Issues and newly-created Rainbow Issues portfolios.

In response to Destiny Church's protest against a Drag Queen Story Hour event in Gisborne in late March 2024, Halbert described the church's behaviour as "very disappointing." While Halbert supported the right to protest, he condemned what he regarded as "vicious discrimination against young people and their families." He also criticised the National-led coalition government's plan to remove sexuality guidelines from schools. Halbert's claim that the National-led government wanted to remove hate speech laws was disputed by Justice Minister Paul Goldsmith, who said that the Government had no plans to remove hate speech protections in law but opposed Labour's proposed hate speech legislation on the grounds that they would have undermined free speech.

In early March 2025, Halbert gained the tertiary education portfolio during a shadow cabinet reshuffle. He retained the Rainbow Issues portfolio but lost the Auckland Issues portfolio.

In mid-March 2026, Halbert retained the tertiary education portfolio but lost the Rainbow Issues portfolio during a cabinet reshuffle. He also gained the Whānau Ora portfolio.

=== Third term, 2026–present ===
During the 2026 New Zealand general election, Halbert contested the Northcote electorate for Labour. He was ranked 19th on the Labour Party list. On 7 November, Halbert came second in the Northcote contest with 12,905 votes based on preliminary results. He was re-elected to Parliament via the Labour Party list.

== Personal life ==
Halbert was one of 13 MPs in the 53rd New Zealand Parliament who identified as LGBTQI+.

== Notes ==
New Zealand Parliament
Preceded by Dan Bidois	Member of Parliament for Northcote; 2020–2023	Succeeded by Dan Bidois
