= Raymond Huo =

New Zealand politician

- 霍建强
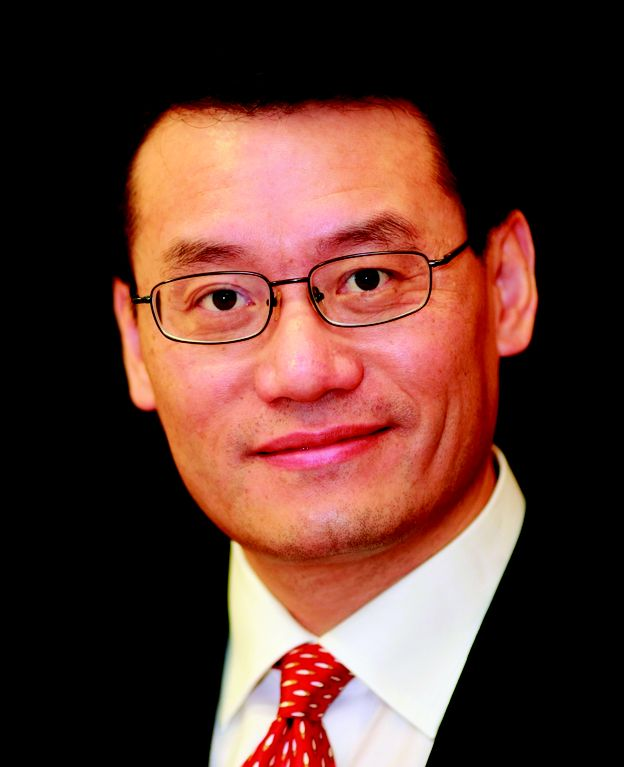

Member of the New Zealand Parliament for Labour Party List
- In office 16 March 2017 – 17 October 2020
- Preceded by: Jacinda Ardern
- In office 8 November 2008 – 20 September 2014

Personal details
- Born: Huo Jianqiang 霍建强; 1964 (age 61–62) Qianshan, Anhui, China
- Party: Labour
- Education: University of Auckland; Anhui University; China University of Political Science and Law
- Profession: Lawyer

Raymond Huo (simplified Chinese: 霍建强; traditional Chinese: 霍建強; pinyin: Hùo Jiànqiáng; born 1964) is a New Zealand politician who was a Member of Parliament from 2008 to 2014 and from 2017 to 2020. He was first elected in 2008 as the New Zealand Labour Party's first MP of Chinese descent. He was the third Chinese New Zealander to enter Parliament, after the National Party's Pansy Wong and ACT's Kenneth Wang.

Huo announced in July 2020 that he would not be standing in the 2020 election. Multiple news outlets reported in 2021 that his retirement from Parliament came after intelligence agencies flagged concerns about his relationship with the Chinese Government, and was arranged as part of a deal between Prime Minister Jacinda Ardern and Opposition Leader Todd Muller that also involved National MP Jian Yang leaving Parliament for the same reason.

== Early life ==
Huo was born in Qianshan, an eastern part of China, where his mother still lives. Huo's father was a doctor, and his mother was a head nurse. They were in their early thirties when they volunteered to move from the capital city to Qianshan to help the local population fight schistosoma, a parasitic disease. It was here that Huo first picked up some of the ideals and beliefs, such as social justice and equity, which would lead him into politics.

Being a medical professional did not spare Huo's father from persecution during the Cultural Revolution. His father—an "intellectual"—was ordered to stand at the gates of the hospital for an hour, three times a day with a white board stating "counter-revolutionary medical expert". Huo, only 5 years old at the time, joined him with a smaller whiteboard saying "little counter-revolutionary medical expert".

Huo credits his time in the small rural town as a major influence on his desire for free-will that he has carried into his politics and world view.

According to his maiden speech to Parliament, Huo taught himself to speak English as a teenager in China by listening to the radio. Huo states that he studied at Anhui University in Hefei and at China University of Political Science and Law in Beijing, and that the latter appointed an Honorary Professor of Law.

Huo emigrated to New Zealand in 1994. He worked as a journalist for The New Zealand Herald where he was the Asian Affairs reporter. He subsequently obtained a MLitt (First Class Honours) majoring in political communication, and an LLB from the University of Auckland. Prior to becoming a Member of Parliament, Huo practiced law in Auckland at Brookfields and Hesketh Henry.

== Member of Parliament ==
New Zealand Parliament
Years	Term	Electorate	List	Party
2008–2011	49th	List	21	Labour
2011–2014	50th	List	21	Labour
2017	51st	List	21	Labour
2017–2020	52nd	List	13	Labour

=== Fifth National Government, 2008–2014 ===
Huo was elected via the Labour Party list at the 2008 election and appointed as spokesman for Statistics, the Law Commission and Chinese Community Affairs. He also sat on the select committee for Law and Order and a Trustee on the Board of the Asia:New Zealand Foundation. He was initially mooted for the Labour nomination in the new electorate of Botany, but eventually chose to stand as a list-only candidate.

Huo was a strong advocate for Ethnic Representation on the new board of the Auckland Council Super City and submitted the Local Government (Auckland Council) (Asian Advisory Board) Amendment Bill to the House. Although Huo's Bill was voted down in Parliament by 64 votes to 58 on 4 November 2009, the National-led Government soon after announced that an Ethnic Advisory Board Panel would be established on the new council.

Following Green Party co-leader Russel Norman's controversial protest to PRC Vice President Xi Jinping during Xi's 2010 visit to New Zealand, Huo wrote a blog entry defending Chinese rule over Tibet. Thuten Kesang, spokesperson for the New Zealand Tibetan community, accused Huo of "promoting communist China progaganda" and said he would lay a formal complaint with the Labour Party.

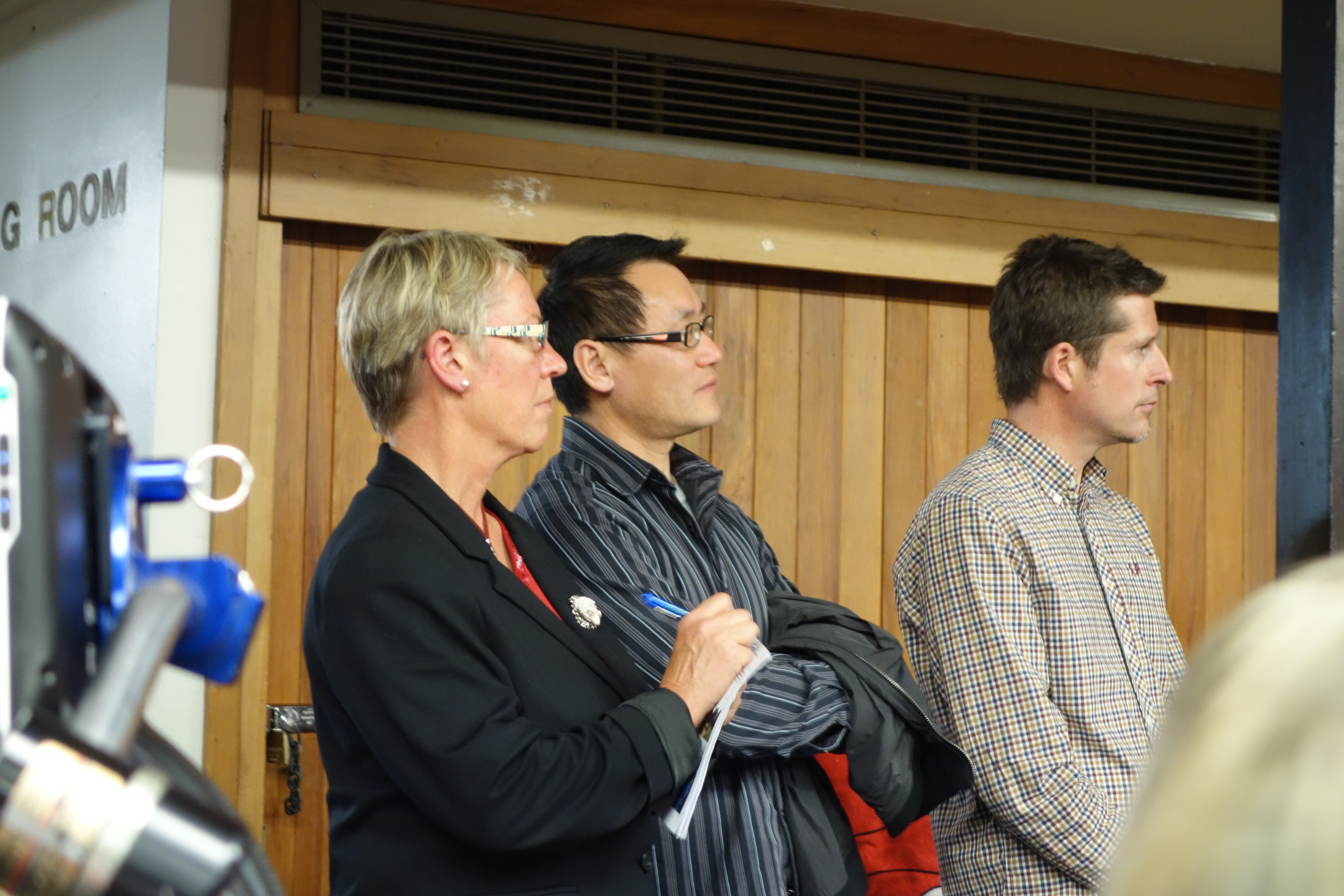
Huo and Ruth Dyson at a Labour function in 2013

In February 2011, Huo urged the New Zealand Government to overhaul the Export Education sector which is worth over $2.3 billion to the country's economy. Huo believes that New Zealand has a reputation for "ghetto education" in Asian countries and must change this or risk losing hundreds of International students from the Asian region. He also urged Prime Minister John Key to incorporate the Education (export education by private training establishments) Amendment Bill into the current Education Amendment Bill (No 4), citing the importance of the international student market.

Huo was re-elected in 2011, but due to his party's poor showing in the 2014 election lost his seat in Parliament and returned to legal practice.

=== Return to Parliament, 2017–2020 ===
In February 2017, Labour list MP Jacinda Ardern won the 2017 Mount Albert by-election, which allowed the party to bring a new list MP to parliament. Huo was the third-highest ranked Labour candidate not to enter parliament at the 2014 election. Both people ranked higher, Maryan Street and Moana Mackey, announced they would decline the chance to return to Parliament. Huo was declared elected on 15 March 2017 and sworn in as an MP on 16 March 2017, and appointed Labour's spokesman on Land Information.

During the 2017 general election held on 23 September, Huo stood as a Labour candidate and was elected as a party list candidate. When Huo's party formed the new government he was appointed chairperson of the Justice Committee, although he stepped down from that position when the Committee inquired into foreign interference in New Zealand elections.

In September 2017, New Zealand China expert and University of Canterbury political scientist Dr Anne-Marie Brady alleged in a conference paper that Huo was a pro-China influencer who helped to advance China's united front strategy of co-opting political and business elites in New Zealand. According to Brady, Huo worked very closely with the Chinese Government and had close contacts with the Zhi Gong Party, one of the eight legal parties in China subordinate to the Chinese Communist Party that focuses on promoting relations between Beijing and Chinese diaspora communities abroad. Observers have also noted Huo's relationship with Communist Party-connected businessman and political donor, Yikun Zhang. Brady also claimed that Huo's decision to translate Labour's 2017 election campaign slogan "Let's do it" into Xi Jinping's quote "roll up your sleeves and work hard" carried sexual connotations. Huo has responded critically to Brady's allegations, stating "that there was a fine line between what Brady has alleged and the genuine promotion of the NZ-China relationship."

In mid November 2017, Huo filed a defamation suit against New Zealand People's Party President Steven Ching and his wife Ailian Su for allegedly promoting a smear campaign that Huo had a criminal record and had tried to get the Police to erase it. The issues were settled in March 2018 following Ching and Su's written apology and the payment of Huo's legal costs. Huo had previously been part of the Ching's legal team after allegations that Ching had misused government connections while standing as a Labour candidate in 2005.

In early March 2019, Huo as Chair of the parliamentary Justice Select Committee declined Dr Anne-Marie Brady's request to testify at a Parliamentary justice committee to examine potential foreign interference as part of its review of the 2017 general election. Huo, who had been named as a key pro-China influencer in Brady's conference paper, had declined her request on the procedural grounds that she had submitted her application five months after the final deadline on 23 September 2018. Huo and the other Labour members of the Justice Select Committee voted against Brady's application, triggering criticism from the opposition National Party electoral reform spokesperson Nick Smith. In response to media coverage, Huo reversed his earlier decision and extended an invitation for Dr Brady to speak to select committee members. Huo later criticised Smith for leaking the internal voting of the Justice select committee and playing on his identity as a Chinese–born MP.

Huo announced on 21 July 2020 that he would not contest the 2020 general election, stating that he wanted to spend more time with his family. He regarded his role in the establishment of the New Zealand Chinese Language Week in 2014 as one of the highlights of his parliamentary career. In 2021, it was reported that his retirement from Parliament came as the result of a secret deal between Prime Minister Jacinda Ardern and Opposition Leader Todd Muller after intelligence agencies raised concerns about his and National MP Jian Yang's relationships with the Chinese Government. According to reports, the two leaders arranged for both Huo and Jian to leave Parliament at the 2020 election "with a minimum of fuss".

== Author ==
Huo has published a number of books and articles including, Now in New Zealand, Something to Crow About, Jinma: Philosophy on Wisdom and Human Life (five volumes), Simplified American novels with Chinese notes: Love of Life, Life in the woods and five others, Lexicon of Contemporary English, Collected Works with Equivalent Chinese, Lexicon of Contemporary English, a Concise Edition, and The New Zealand Quartet.
