= Sport New Zealand =

New Zealand Crown entity responsible for governing sport and recreation

Agency overview
- Jurisdiction: New Zealand
- Headquarters: 29 Brandon Street, Wellington, New Zealand; 41.2834°S 174.776°E
- Minister responsible: Hon Mark Mitchell, Minister for Sport and Recreation
- Agency executive: Raelene Castle, CEO
- Website: www.sportnz.org.nz

Sport New Zealand (Sport NZ) (Māori: Ihi Aotearoa) is a New Zealand Crown entity responsible for governing sport and recreation in New Zealand.

Their subsidiary High Performance Sport New Zealand deals with elite athletes.

== Legislation and functions ==
The principal governing legislation of Sport NZ is the Sport and Recreation New Zealand Act 2002. As a Crown entity, it is responsible to the Minister of Sport and Recreation via its board of directors.

Section 8 of the Act sets out the functions of Sport New Zealand as the following:

- Develop and implement national policies and strategies for physical recreation and sport
- Allocate funds to organisations and regional bodies in line with its policies and strategies
- Promote and advocate the importance of participation in physical activity by all New Zealanders for their health and well-being
- Promote and disseminate research relevant to physical recreation and sport
- Provide advice to the Minister on issues relating to physical recreation and sport
- Promote and support the development and implementation of physical recreation and sport in a way that is culturally appropriate to Māori
- Encourage participation in physical recreation and sport by Pacific peoples, women, older New Zealanders, and people with disabilities
- Recognise the role of physical recreation and sport in the rehabilitation of people with disabilities
- Facilitate the resolution of disputes between persons or organisations involved in physical recreation and sport
- Work with schools, regional, central, and local government, and physical recreation and sports organisations to ensure the maintenance and development of the physical and organisational infrastructure for physical recreation and sport
- Work with health, education, and other agencies to promote greater participation in physical recreation and sport through policy development, advocacy, and support, in line with the objectives of the New Zealand health strategy
- Provide advice and support for organisations working in physical recreation and sport at national, regional, and local levels
- Facilitate co-ordination between national, regional, and local physical recreation and sport organisations
- Represent the Government’s policy interests in physical recreation and sport internationally.

== History ==
In 2022, Sport NZ introduced its "Guiding Principles for the Inclusion of Transgender People in Community Sport" to regulate the participation of transgender people in competitive sports. In October 2024, Sport and Recreation Minister Chris Bishop instructed Sport NZ to review its 2022 Guiding Principles, emphasising that they were supposed to be voluntary rather than mandatory.

In November 2024, Sport and Recreation Minister Chris Bishop ordered a review into Sport NZ's spending following concerns that the Crown agency's funding strategy had become a "free for all." In June 2025, the new Sport and Recreation Minister Mark Mitchell released the findings of the review, which gave a favourable appraisal of Sport NZ's expenditure but recommended that Sport NZ's strategic policy function be transferred to the Ministry for Culture and Heritage. The report cited a conflict of interest in Sport NZ's role as both a policy advisor and decision-maker on funding.

In mid-June 2025, the Government reduced Sport NZ's expenditure by NZ$2.9 million a year. Mitchell also confirmed that the agency would be working with other agencies to reduce youth offending. In late July 2025, Sport and Recreation Minister Mitchell ordered Sport NZ to scrap its transgender inclusive sports guidelines. The anti-transgender group Save Women's Sport Australasia had previously lobbied Mitchell's predecessor Bishop and New Zealand First leader Winston Peters into dropping the guidelines. The Labour Party's rainbow issues spokesperson Shanan Halbert described the scrapping of the transgender inclusive guidelines as a "step backwards" while the Green Party's rainbow issues spokesperson Benjamin Doyle said that the Sixth National Government had failed rainbow communities.

== High Performance Sport New Zealand ==
High Performance Sport New Zealand (HPSNZ) is the subsidiary of Sport New Zealand responsible for governing New Zealand's high performance sport programme. It was formed in 2011 following the merger of Sport New Zealand's high performance unit with the country's two academies of sport.
