= Minister for Sport and Recreation (New Zealand) =

New Zealand minister of the Crown

- Coat of arms of New Zealand

- Flag of New Zealand

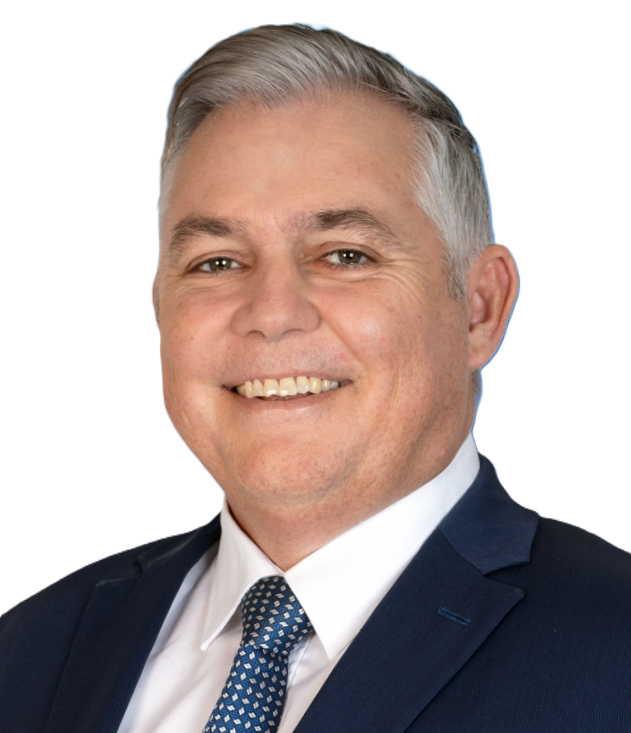
- Incumbent; Mark Mitchell since 24 January 2025
- Sport New Zealand
- Style: The Honourable
- Member of: Cabinet of New Zealand; Executive Council
- Reports to: Prime Minister of New Zealand
- Appointer: Governor-General of New Zealand
- Term length: At His Majesty's pleasure
- Formation: 8 December 1972
- First holder: Joe Walding
- Salary: $288,900
- Website: www.beehive.govt.nz

The Minister for Sport and Recreation is a minister in the New Zealand Government appointed by the Prime Minister to be in charge of Sport New Zealand. The current Minister for Sport and Recreation is Mark Mitchell.

== List of ministers ==
The following ministers have held the office of Minister for Sport and Recreation.

Key

Labour National

No.	Name	Portrait	Term of Office		Prime Minister
1	Joe Walding		8 December 1972	12 December 1975	Kirk
1	Joe Walding		8 December 1972	12 December 1975	Rowling
2	Allan Highet		12 December 1975	26 July 1984	Muldoon
3	Mike Moore		26 July 1984	24 July 1987	Lange
4	Peter Tapsell		24 July 1987	10 July 1990	Lange
4	Peter Tapsell		24 July 1987	10 July 1990	Palmer
5	Noel Scott		10 July 1990	2 November 1990	Palmer
5	Noel Scott		10 July 1990	2 November 1990	Moore
6	John Banks		2 November 1990	16 December 1996	Bolger
7	Murray McCully		16 December 1996	10 December 1999	Bolger
7	Murray McCully		16 December 1996	10 December 1999	Shipley
8	Trevor Mallard		10 December 1999	31 October 2007	Clark
9	Clayton Cosgrove		31 October 2007	19 November 2008	Clark
(7)	Murray McCully		19 November 2008	6 October 2014	Key
10	Jonathan Coleman		6 October 2014	26 October 2017	Key
10	Jonathan Coleman		6 October 2014	26 October 2017	English
11	Grant Robertson		26 October 2017	27 November 2023	Ardern
11	Grant Robertson		26 October 2017	27 November 2023	Hipkins
12	Chris Bishop		27 November 2023	24 January 2025	Luxon
13	Mark Mitchell		24 January 2025	present	Luxon
