= Jo Hayes =

New Zealand politician

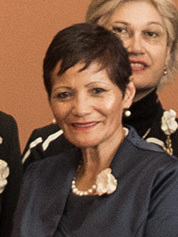
- Hayes in 2018

Member of the New Zealand Parliament for National Party List
- In office 22 January 2014 – 17 October 2020
- Preceded by: Katrina Shanks (Note: Normally, list MPs do not have individual predecessors or successors, but Shanks resigned during a sitting parliament and therefore was succeeded by Hayes.)

Personal details
- Born: 1959 (age 66–67)
- Party: National Party
- Children: 2
- Profession: Member of Parliament
- Website: www.johayes.co.nz

Joanne Kowhai Hayes (born 1959) is a former New Zealand politician who served as a New Zealand National Party List MP in the New Zealand House of Representatives from 2014 to 2020.

== Early life and career ==
Hayes' whakapapa is to the Whanganui-Rangitikei area. She was raised in the farming sector. Before being elected to Parliament, she worked in the health industry, as well as at Māori development organisation Ngā Tai O te Awa.

== Political career ==
New Zealand Parliament
Years	Term	Electorate	List	Party
2014	50th	List	64	National
2014–2017	51st	List	47	National
2017–2020	52nd	List	36	National

During the 2011 general election, Hayes ran for National in Dunedin South, and was ranked 64th place on the party list. Hayes was defeated by Labour incumbent Clare Curran by a margin of 4,175 votes.

=== In Government, 2014–2017 ===
In December 2013, National Party President Peter Goodfellow announced that Hayes would enter Parliament on the party list following the resignation of National MP Katrina Shanks, which took place on 22 January 2014. She was sworn in as a Member of the New Zealand House of Representatives on 28 January 2014.

During the 2014 general election, Hayes sought to be National's Wairarapa candidate but lost to Alastair Scott. Instead she was selected to contest Christchurch East against Labour's Poto Williams. Hayes lost to Williams by a margin of 4,073 votes but was re-elected as a list MP.

During the 51st New Zealand Parliament, under the Fifth National Government, Hayes served as the National Party's Third Whip, as a member of the Māori Affairs and Local Government and Environment Committees, and as the Chair of the Social Services Committee.

In April 2017, a private members' bill in Hayes' name was introduced into Parliament. The Minors (Court Consent to Relationships) Legislation Bill sought to prevent 16- and 17-year-olds from being pressured or coerced into legal and cultural marriages by amending the Marriage Act 1955 to require the marriage be approved by a Family Court judge. The Bill was supported by all parties represented in Parliament and completed its final reading in August 2018.

During the 2017 general election, Hayes contested Christchurch East against incumbent Poto Williams and was defeated by a margin of 7,480 votes. However, she was re-elected on the National Party list.

=== In Opposition, 2017–2020 ===
In the 52nd New Zealand Parliament, National was in Opposition and Hayes served as her party's spokesperson for Māori development and Whānau Ora. During her second term in Parliament, Hayes also voted against the Abortion Legislation Act 2020 and the End of Life Choice Act 2019.

During the lead up to the 2020 general election, Hayes unsuccessfully sought to stand as National's candidate in both Palmerston North (which she lost to 17-year-old William Wood) and in Te Tai Hauāuru (the party did not stand candidates in Māori electorates). Ultimately, Hayes was selected as National's candidate for Mana.

During the 2020 election, she lost to Labour's candidate Barbara Edmonds by a margin of 16,224 votes. She also failed to get in on the party list due to National's landslide defeat.

== Post-parliamentary career ==
Three days after the 2020 election, Hayes was announced as the general manager of the Rangitāne Tū Mai Rā Trust, a post-settlement governance entity for the Rangitāne o Wairarapa and Rangitāne o Tamaki nui-ā-Rua iwi.

Hayes was an unsuccessful candidate in the 2022 Masterton mayoral election. In May 2025, Hayes took part in the unofficial cross-party People's Select Committee, led by Marilyn Waring, which investigated the pay equity changes by the National government.

== Personal life ==
Hayes is of Ngāti Porou, Ati Haunui A Paparangi, and Rangitane ki Wairarapa descent. She is married, and has two sons and three grandchildren.
