= Jonathan Coleman (politician) =

New Zealand politician (born 1966)

The Honourable Doctor Jonathan Coleman
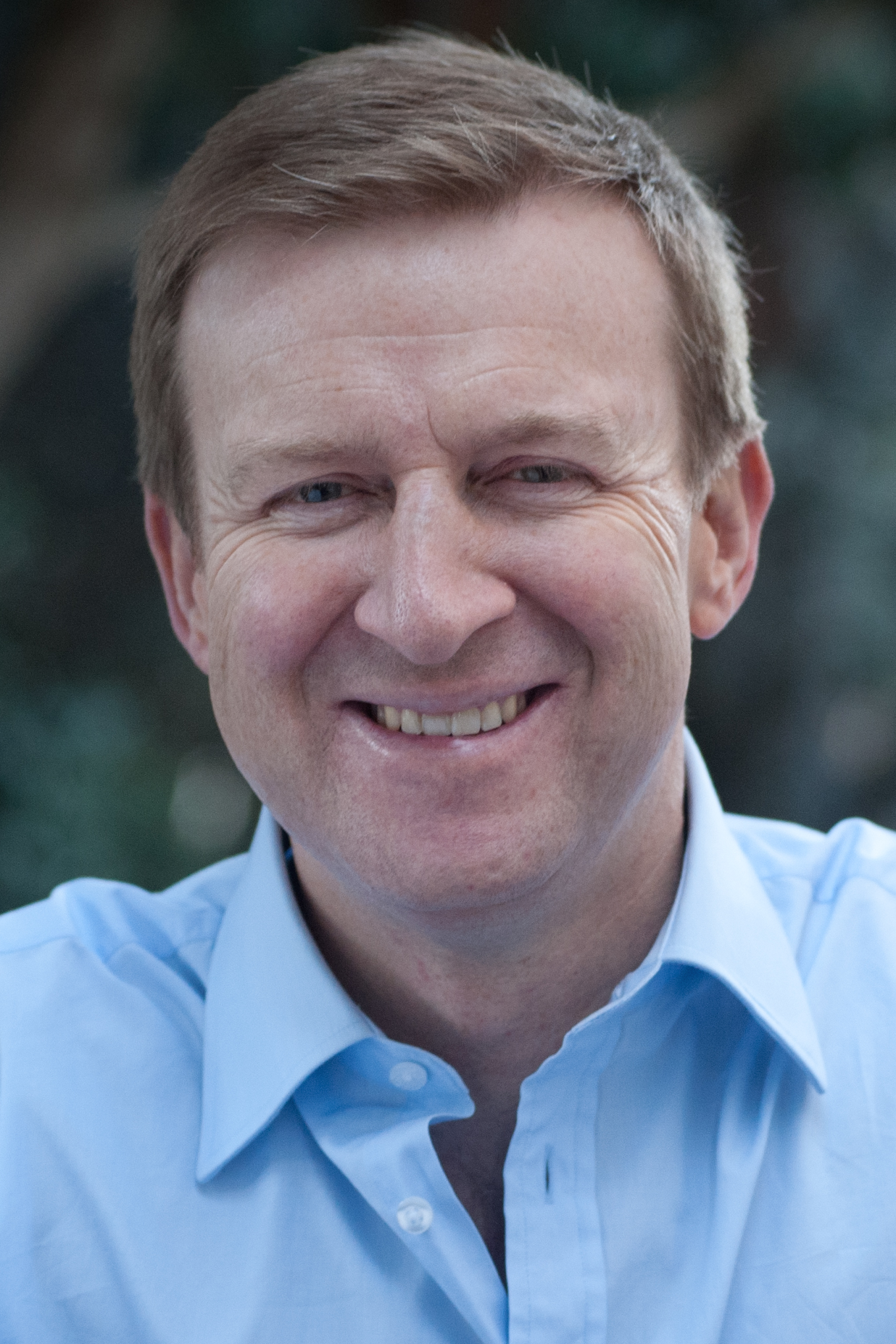

39th Minister of Health
- In office 8 October 2014 – 26 October 2017
- Prime Minister: John Key; Bill English
- Preceded by: Tony Ryall
- Succeeded by: David Clark

10th Minister for Sport and Recreation
- In office 8 October 2014 – 26 October 2017
- Prime Minister: John Key; Bill English
- Preceded by: Murray McCully
- Succeeded by: Grant Robertson

37th Minister of Defence
- In office 14 December 2011 – 8 October 2014
- Prime Minister: John Key
- Preceded by: Wayne Mapp
- Succeeded by: Gerry Brownlee

Minister of State Services
- In office 14 December 2011 – 8 October 2014
- Prime Minister: John Key
- Preceded by: Tony Ryall
- Succeeded by: Paula Bennett

53rd Minister of Immigration
- In office 19 November 2008 – 14 December 2011
- Prime Minister: John Key
- Preceded by: Clayton Cosgrove
- Succeeded by: Nathan Guy

Member of the New Zealand Parliament for Northcote
- In office 17 September 2005 – 15 April 2018
- Preceded by: Ann Hartley
- Succeeded by: Dan Bidois

Personal details
- Born: 23 September 1966 (age 60) Auckland, New Zealand
- Party: National Party
- Education: University of Auckland; London Business School

Jonathan David Coleman (born 23 September 1966) is a retired New Zealand politician and medical practitioner, who most recently served as Minister of Health and Sport and Recreation under the Fifth National Government. Coleman also served as Minister of Defence and Immigration within the first two terms of that government, and represented the parliamentary constituency Northcote for the National Party from 2005 to 2018.

Coleman trained in medicine at the University of Auckland before acquiring an MBA from the London Business School in the United Kingdom. In the 2005 election, Coleman stood as the National Party's candidate for the Northcote seat, defeating Ann Hartley of the Labour Party in what was the only Labour seat to flip to National in the entire election. He became a cabinet minister upon John Key leading the party to victory in 2008. A member of National's right-wing faction, Coleman has espoused socially conservative views, notably opposing gay marriage and free reassignment healthcare for transgender people. He oversaw austerity as Health Minister, including multiple budget cuts across the medical sector. These were controversial to the point in which a motion of no confidence was almost tabled in him by members of the Southern District Health Board in 2015.

Coleman announced his intention to seek the National Party leadership in 2016 after John Key announced his intention to resign, but withdrew, allowing Bill English to succeed as Prime Minister unopposed.

== Early years ==
After attending Auckland Grammar School, Coleman trained as a doctor, graduating from University of Auckland's medical school. He worked as a doctor in New Zealand, the United Kingdom, and Australia (in the latter case, for the Royal Flying Doctor Service). He later obtained an MBA from London Business School in 2000, and returned to New Zealand the following year.

Coleman worked for PricewaterhouseCoopers as consultant on health sector issues and as a part-time general practitioner in Ōtara. He entered the selection for the National Party candidacy for Tamaki but was defeated by Allan Peachey before successfully contesting the candidacy for Northcote.

Coleman has a 170-year family connection to his Northcote electorate. He has also claimed to have “a bit of tangata whenua thrown in to [his] bloodline”, but he has never shown evidence of having Māori whakapapa, nor affiliated himself to any iwi.

== Member of Parliament ==
New Zealand Parliament
Years	Term	Electorate	List	Party
2005–2008	48th	Northcote	35	National
2008–2011	49th	Northcote	29	National
2011–2014	50th	Northcote	16	National
2014–2017	51st	Northcote	10	National
2017–2018	52nd	Northcote	8	National

In the 2005 election, Coleman stood as the National Party's candidate for the Northcote seat and was ranked 35th on the party's list. He had previously unsuccessfully sought the party's nomination in the Tamaki electorate. Coleman was successful in Northcote, defeating Ann Hartley of the Labour Party. This was the only Auckland seat to change hands between Labour and National in the 2005 election.

In 2006, Coleman (then the National Party's associate health spokesman) caused controversy when he accepted British American Tobacco's – an active lobbier on health sector issues – offer of sitting in their corporate box during a U2 concert. It was alleged he blew cigar smoke at a woman during the concert. Coleman admitted he made a mistake by sitting in British American Tobacco's corporate box and smoking at a U2 concert.

In the 2008 election Coleman was re-elected in Northcote with a majority of 9,360 votes. He was again successful in the 2011 election, winning by a majority of 9,379 votes. He had a slightly increased majority in the 2014 election.

=== 2011–14 ===
After being re-elected for a third term for the Northcote seat in November 2011, Coleman was promoted in Cabinet to Minister of Defence, Minister of State Services and Associate Minister of Finance.

In 2012, Coleman made a secret visit to Afghanistan to visit New Zealand troops. Coleman said the visit was a "chance for him to offer his support to the troops for the important work they were doing providing security in the province".

As Minister of Defence, Coleman led the implementation of the 2010 Defence White Paper. He commissioned the Defence Mid-Point Rebalancing Review which set out the long term approach, balancing funding, capabilities and policy. Coleman oversaw the NZDF's successful withdrawal from its three largest missions in Afghanistan, Solomon Islands and Timor-Leste.

Coleman voted against the Marriage (Definition of Marriage) Amendment Act 2013.

=== 2014–18 ===
In 2014 Coleman became the first doctor in 70 years to take the health portfolio. In May 2015, Coleman described the Young Labour's proposal for free gender reassignment surgery for transgender people in New Zealand as a "nutty idea".

On 20 May 2015, a meeting in Alexandra organised by Central Otago Health Services Ltd supported a vote of no confidence in Health Minister Jonathan Coleman. When Russell Garbutt moved a motion of no confidence in the minister and emailed him the following morning, he did not expect Coleman to pick up the phone and call [him]. They spoke for more than 10 minutes, with Coleman telling Mr Garbutt the Southern District Health Board (SDHB) was his ''number 1'' priority in respect of its budget woes.

==== Leadership campaign ====
Coleman announced his intention to seek the National Party leadership in 2016 after John Key announced his intention to resign. He was unsuccessful, with Bill English becoming the new PM.

==== Resignation ====
On 22 March 2018, Coleman announced he would resign from Parliament, thereby triggering the 2018 Northcote by-election.

== Post-political life ==
In October 2026, Coleman voiced disagreement with the National Party's campaign pledge during the 2026 New Zealand general election to drug test beneficiaries.

New Zealand Parliament
Preceded by Ann Hartley	Member of Parliament for Northcote; 2005–2018	Succeeded by Dan Bidois
Political offices
Preceded by Clayton Cosgrove	Minister of Immigration; 2008–2011	Succeeded by Nathan Guy
Preceded by Wayne Mapp	Minister of Defence; 2011–2014	Succeeded by Gerry Brownlee
Preceded by Tony Ryall	Minister of State Services; 2011–2014	Succeeded by Paula Bennett
Preceded by Tony Ryall	Minister of Health; 2014–2017	Succeeded by David Clark
Preceded by Murray McCully	Minister for Sport and Recreation; 2014–2017	Succeeded by Grant Robertson
