= Jian Yang (politician) =

New Zealand National Party politician (born 1962)

- 杨建
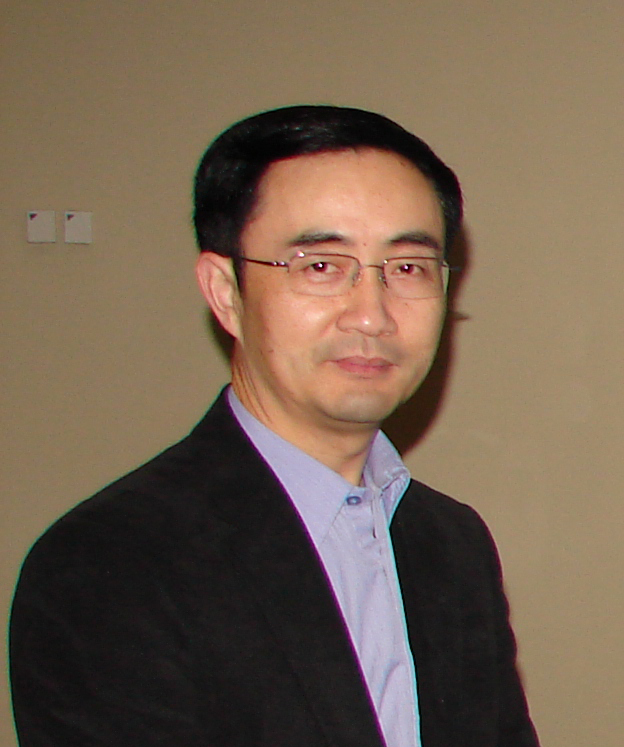
- Photograph of Yang in 2010

Member of the New Zealand Parliament for National
- In office 26 November 2011 – 17 October 2020

Personal details
- Born: October 1962 (age 64) Jiangxi, China
- Party: New Zealand National Party
- Other political affiliations: Chinese Communist Party
- Occupation: Academic, politician

Jian Yang (simplified Chinese: 杨健; traditional Chinese: 楊建; pinyin: Yáng Jiàn; born October 1962) is a Chinese New Zealander international relations academic, politician and a former member of the New Zealand House of Representatives. Before moving to New Zealand, he was a member of the Chinese Communist Party and worked for the People's Liberation Army, including training linguists to intercept foreign communications. He is a member of the National Party and was a National MP from 2011 until the 2020 general election, when he retired.

Several news outlets reported in 2021 that his retirement from Parliament came after intelligence agencies flagged concerns about his relationship with the Chinese Government, and was arranged as part of a deal between Prime Minister Jacinda Ardern and Opposition Leader Todd Muller that also involved Labour MP Raymond Huo leaving Parliament for the same reason.

== Early life ==
Yang grew up in Jiangxi Province in southern China. He earned his MA and PhD in international relations from the Australian National University.

In 1999 Yang joined the University of Auckland as a Senior Lecturer in Political Studies. He was granted New Zealand citizenship on 14 June 2004.

== Member of Parliament ==
New Zealand Parliament
Years	Term	Electorate	List	Party
2011–2014	50th	List	36	National
2014–2017	51st	List	33	National
2017–2020	52nd	List	33	National

Yang was ranked at 36 on the National Party list for the 2011 New Zealand general election. He was the highest ranked new candidate on the list and was seen as a replacement for Pansy Wong, a Chinese MP who had resigned since the previous election.

Yang was re-elected on the party list in 2014 and 2017. During his parliamentary career, Yang was the deputy chair of the Health select committee from 2013 to 2014, the chair of the Education and Science committee from 2014 to 2017 and the chair of Governance and Administration committee from 2017 to 2020. He was additionally appointed a Parliamentary Private Secretary to the Minister for Ethnic Communities in 2017 and the National Party opposition spokesperson for statistics from 2017 to 2020.

In 2019, it was reported that Yang organised a meeting between National Party leader Simon Bridges and Guo Shengkun, the head of the Chinese Communist Party secret police during a visit to China.

While he was initially re-selected as a National Party list candidate in March 2020 for that year's general election, Yang later announced his retirement from politics following renewed pressure from New Zealand First MP Winston Peters over his alleged links to Chinese military intelligence.

It was later reported that his retirement from Parliament came as the result of a secret deal between Prime Minister Jacinda Ardern and Opposition Leader Todd Muller after intelligence agencies raised concerns about his and Labour MP Raymond Huo's relationships with the Chinese Government. According to reports, the two leaders arranged for both Jian and Huo to leave Parliament at the 2020 election "with a minimum of fuss".

== Foreign agent allegations ==
On 13 September 2017 accusations were raised in the media that Yang taught English to Chinese spies in the 1980s and 1990s. Yang admitted he had a background as a civilian, or non-ranking, officer in the Chinese military. In response to the accusations, the National Party released a copy of Yang's CV from 2012, which mentioned his time at the Air Force Engineering College and Luoyang People's Liberation Army University of Foreign Languages. The Financial Times says the Foreign Languages Institute is part of China's military intelligence apparatus run by the People's Liberation Army, training linguists to intercept foreign communications; Yang is also a graduate of this same institution. It was also reported that Yang attracted the attention of the New Zealand Security Intelligence Service three years prior to these revelations. Yang was a lecturer at the Foreign Language Institute and his immigration file shows he taught the English language and American studies. Yang claimed he taught his students to simply monitor communications, rather than carry out "the physical act of spying". He conceded he could be seen as having taught spies. The New Zealand Herald later reported that Yang did not disclose his links to the schools in his citizenship applications and instead substituted "partner" universities.

Yang also confirmed that he had been a member of the Chinese Communist Party but claimed to be inactive since moving to New Zealand in 1994.

Just months after first taking a seat in Parliament following the 2011 election, Yang lobbied ministers in a bid to overturn a national security block on a China-born job applicant taking up a sensitive position in the defence force. The position sought by the applicant was redacted, but the letter specifies it required applicants to pass SIS vetting to enable access to information classed as "Secret". Yang denied he had been lobbying to overturn a security clearance decision, and claimed he had simply been forwarding correspondence from a constituent.

In late June 2020, Yang came under further criticism from media and New Zealand First leader Winston Peters for refusing to give English-language interviews since the spy allegations surfaced and only granting interviews to Chinese-language media. He then announced his retirement from Parliament, reportedly as a result of a deal between Prime Minister Jacinda Ardern and Opposition Leader Todd Muller after intelligence agencies raised concerns about his and Labour MP Raymond Huo's relationships with the Chinese Government.

First-term National Party list MP Nancy Lu was sitting in an interview with Chinese-language media outlet Panda TV37 next to Dr Jian Yang in 2020 when the outgoing MP and alleged Chinese spy admitted he handpicked Lu to be his successor, saying he had “trained” her to stand for the party “for a long time” and kept it secret from his colleagues.
