= Northcote (New Zealand electorate) =

- Single-member general constituency for the New Zealand House of Representatives
- Interactive map of boundaries from the 2026 election
- Formation: 1996
- Region: Auckland
- Character: Suburban
- Term: 3 years

Member for Northcote
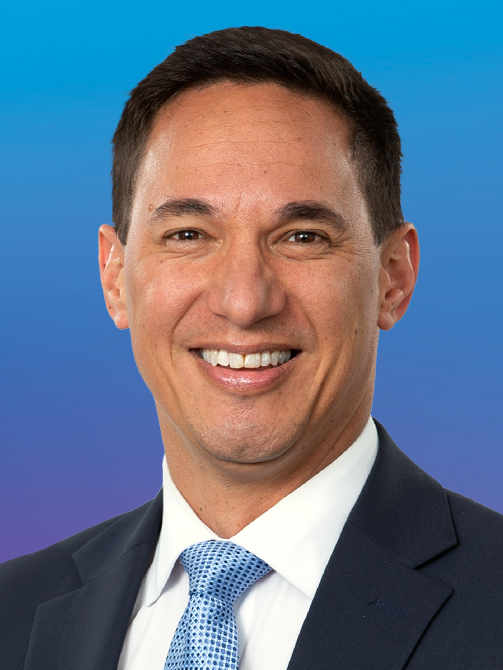
- Dan Bidois since 14 October 2023
- Party: National
- List MPs: Shanan Halbert Labour)
- Previous MP: Shanan Halbert (Labour)
Party vote distribution

Northcote is a New Zealand parliamentary electorate, returning one member of parliament to the New Zealand House of Representatives. Currently, the Member for Northcote is Dan Bidois of the National Party, who won the seat at the 2023 election.

== Population centres ==
Map of boundaries at the 2020 and 2023 general elections

Northcote is based around the suburbs of Auckland's North Shore that are closest to the northern end of the Auckland Harbour Bridge. In addition to the eponymous Northcote, there are Birkenhead, Birkdale, Beach Haven, Chatswood, Hillcrest and the southern end of Glenfield with Auckland Northern Motorway forming the eastern boundary. It was created ahead of the change to mixed-member proportional (MMP) voting in 1996 by merging the seat of Birkenhead with most of the old Glenfield electorate. A small boundary adjustment was done prior to the 1999 election, but no further boundary adjustments were undertaken in the subsequent redistributions in 2002, 2007, and 2013/14. The 2025 boundary review added part of the Wairau Valley from Upper Harbour.

Northcote continues the electoral habits of its predecessor seats; Birkenhead was a reasonably safe seat for the National Party, supplying it with Jim McLay, who led the party from 1984 to 1986. In 1987, the seat was won by Labour, before swinging back into the blue column when Labour's fortunes thinned out at the 1990 election. Glenfield also followed this boom and bust model, being held by Labour Party MP Judy Keall through the duration of the fourth Labour government before the National Party landslide in 1990 claimed Keall as one of its victims.

== Members ==
The first member for Northcote was Ian Revell from the National Party, who would rise to become the Deputy Speaker. Revell was caught up in a scandal for misuse of official letterhead and was defeated by Labour's Ann Hartley in 1999 New Zealand general election. Hartley herself was ousted by the seat's former representative, Jonathan Coleman, when National consolidated the centre-right vote in 2005. In the 2008 election Coleman was re-elected in Northcote with a majority of 9,360 votes. He was again successful in the 2011 election, winning by a majority of 9,379 votes. He had a slightly increased majority in the 2014 election and was re-elected in the 2017 election. On 22 March 2018, Coleman announced he would resign within weeks, triggering the 2018 Northcote by-election.

=== Members for Northcote ===
Key

National Labour Alliance

Election	Winner
1996 election	Ian Revell
1999 election	Ann Hartley
2002 election	Ann Hartley
2005 election	Jonathan Coleman
2008 election	Jonathan Coleman
2011 election	Jonathan Coleman
2014 election	Jonathan Coleman
2017 election	Jonathan Coleman
2018 by-election	Dan Bidois
2020 election	Shanan Halbert
2023 election	Dan Bidois

=== List members ===
Members of Parliament elected from party lists in elections where that person also unsuccessfully contested the Northcote electorate. Unless otherwise stated, all members’ terms began and ended at general elections.

Election	Winner
1996 election	Grant Gillon
1999 election	Grant Gillon
2005 election	Ann Hartley (Note: Hartley resigned from Parliament on 28 February 2008.)
2024	Shanan Halbert

== Election results ==
=== 2026 election ===
The next election will be held on 7 November 2026. Candidates for Northcote are listed at Candidates in the 2026 New Zealand general election by electorate § Northcote. Official results will be available after 27 November 2026.

=== 2023 election ===
2023 general election results: Northcote
Notes:	Blue background denotes the winner of the electorate vote. Pink background denotes a candidate elected from their party list. Yellow background denotes an electorate win by a list member, or other incumbent. A ✓ or ✗ denotes status of any incumbent, win or lose respectively.						
Party	Candidate	Votes	%	±%	Party votes	%	±%
National	Dan Bidois	20,807	54.32	+12.92	16,975	43.46	+15.94
Labour	✗ Shanan Halbert	11,537	30.18	−17.56	9,014	23.08	−26.22
Green	Andrew Shaw	3,341	8.72	+3.96	5,548	14.21	+5.57
NZ First	Michelle Warren	1,048	2.74	+2.74	1,641	4.20	+2.28
ACT	Leo Foley	962	2.51	+0.50	3,381	8.66	+1.36
Vision New Zealand	Mark Donaldson	186	0.49	+0.49			
Opportunities					1,208	3.10	+1.27
Te Pāti Māori					295	0.76	+0.53
NZ Loyal					216	0.55	+0.55
NewZeal					139	0.36	+0.33
Legalise Cannabis					118	0.30	+0.06
Freedoms NZ					103	0.26	+0.26
Animal Justice					81	0.21	+0.21
New Conservatives					54	0.14	−1.19
Women's Rights					38	0.10	+0.10
DemocracyNZ					38	0.10	+0.10
New Nation					14	0.04	+0.04
Leighton Baker Party					8	0.02	+0.02
Informal votes		426			182		
Total valid votes		38,307			39,053		
National gain from Labour	Majority	9,270	24.14	+12.92			

=== 2020 election ===
2020 general election: Northcote
Notes:	Blue background denotes the winner of the electorate vote. Pink background denotes a candidate elected from their party list. Yellow background denotes an electorate win by a list member, or other incumbent. A ✓ or ✗ denotes status of any incumbent, win or lose respectively.						
Party	Candidate	Votes	%	±%	Party votes	%	±%
Labour	Shanan Halbert	19,086	47.74	+12.49	19,860	49.30	+15.14
National	✗ Dan Bidois	16,552	41.40	−10.87	11,086	27.52	−21.15
Green	Natasha Fairley	1,905	4.76	−1.97	3,482	8.64	+1.89
ACT	Tim Kronfeld	806	2.01	+1.20	2,935	7.28	+6.57
New Conservative	Bill Dyet	601	1.50	—	536	1.33	+1.11
Sustainable NZ	Bevan Read	156	0.39	—	53	0.13	—
Outdoors	Lynn Usmani	114	0.28	—	26	0.06	+0.01
NZ First					774	1.92	−1.81
Opportunities					741	1.83	−0.45
Advance NZ					231	0.57	—
Legalise Cannabis					95	0.24	−0.01
Māori Party					93	0.23	−0.14
TEA					89	0.22	—
ONE					44	0.10	—
Vision NZ					13	0.03	—
Social Credit					10	0.02	−0.12
Heartland					2	0.01	—
Informal votes		756			212		
Total valid votes		39,976			40,282		
Turnout		40,282					
Labour gain from National	Majority	2,534	6.34	−10.68			

=== 2018 by-election ===
The following table shows final by-election results:

2018 Northcote by-election
Notes: Blue background denotes the winner of the by-election. Pink background denotes a candidate elected from their party list prior to the by-election. Yellow background denotes the winner of the by-election, who was a list MP prior to the by-election. A ✓ or ✗ denotes status of any incumbent, win or lose respectively.
Party	Candidate	Votes	%	±%
National	Dan Bidois	10,566	50.67	
Labour	Shanan Halbert	9,256	44.39	+9.14
Green	Rebekah Jaung	615	2.94	−3.79
ACT	Stephen Berry	166	0.79	
Independent	Kym Koloni	97	0.46	−3.27
Legalise Cannabis	Jeff Lye	89	0.42	
Democrats	Tricia Cheel	31	0.14	−0.11
Not A Party	Liam Walsh	5	0.02	
Informal votes		25	0.11	
Majority		1,310	6.28	
Turnout		20,850	43.59	−33.98

=== 2017 election ===
2017 general election: Northcote
Notes:	Blue background denotes the winner of the electorate vote. Pink background denotes a candidate elected from their party list. Yellow background denotes an electorate win by a list member, or other incumbent. A ✓ or ✗ denotes status of any incumbent, win or lose respectively.						
Party	Candidate	Votes	%	±%	Party votes	%	±%
National	✓ Jonathan Coleman	19,072	52.27	−4.75	18,005	48.67	−2.04
Labour	Shanan Halbert	12,862	35.25	+6.21	12,639	34.16	+12.05
Green	Rebekah Jaung	2,457	6.73	−2.04	2,496	6.75	−4.86
NZ First	Kym Koloni	1,362	3.73	—	2,221	6.00	−1.32
ACT	Tim Kronfeld	296	0.81	−0.30	261	0.71	−0.91
Democrats	Tricia Cheel	92	0.25	—	50	0.14	+0.08
Opportunities					845	2.28	—
Māori Party					136	0.37	−0.09
Legalise Cannabis					93	0.25	−0.10
Conservative					82	0.22	−4.09
United Future					24	0.06	−0.28
People's Party					23	0.06	—
Outdoors					17	0.05	—
Mana					11	0.03	−0.92
Internet					9	0.02	−0.93
Ban 1080					8	0.02	−0.03
Informal votes		343			75		
Total valid votes		36,484			36,995		
Turnout		37,311	77.57	+0.98			
National hold	Majority	6,210	17.02	−10.96			

=== 2014 election ===
2014 general election: Northcote
Notes:	Blue background denotes the winner of the electorate vote. Pink background denotes a candidate elected from their party list. Yellow background denotes an electorate win by a list member, or other incumbent. A ✓ or ✗ denotes status of any incumbent, win or lose respectively.						
Party	Candidate	Votes	%	±%	Party votes	%	±%
National	✓ Jonathan Coleman	19,696	57.02	−1.44	17,900	50.71	−1.55
Labour	Richard Hills	10,032	29.04	−0.42	7,803	22.11	−2.91
Green	Anne-Elise Smithson	3,030	8.77	+2.93	4,099	11.61	+0.07
Conservative	Matthew James Webster	974	2.82	+1.93	1,522	4.31	+1.82
ACT	Tim Kronfeld	383	1.11	+0.54	573	1.62	+0.15
United Future	Damian Light	159	0.46	+0.46	121	0.34	−0.24
Internet	Gil Ho	270	0.78	+0.78			
NZ First					2,584	7.32	+1.67
Internet Mana					336	0.95	+0.64 (Note: 2014 Internet Mana swing is relative to the votes for Mana in 2011; it shared a party list with Internet in the 2014 election.)
Māori Party					162	0.46	−0.09
Legalise Cannabis					122	0.35	−0.20
Civilian					26	0.07	+0.07
Democrats					20	0.06	+0.03
Ban 1080					17	0.05	+0.05
Independent Coalition					10	0.03	+0.03
Focus					4	0.01	+0.01
Informal votes		306			117		
Total valid votes		34,850			35,416		
Turnout		35,416	75.76	+3.45			
National hold	Majority	9,664	27.98	−1.02			

=== 2011 election ===
2011 general election: Northcote
Notes:	Blue background denotes the winner of the electorate vote. Pink background denotes a candidate elected from their party list. Yellow background denotes an electorate win by a list member, or other incumbent. A ✓ or ✗ denotes status of any incumbent, win or lose respectively.						
Party	Candidate	Votes	%	±%	Party votes	%	±%
National	✓ Jonathan Coleman	18,908	58.46	+0.59	17,263	52.26	+1.85
Labour	Paula Gillon	9,529	29.46	−1.51	8,264	25.02	−4.72
Green	Vernon Tava	1,890	5.84	−0.04	3,614	10.94	+4.25
NZ First	Dion Clifford Jelley	732	2.26	+2.26	1,865	5.65	+2.48
Conservative	Matthew James Webster	593	1.83	+1.83	824	2.49	+2.49
Legalise Cannabis	Leo Biggs	289	0.89	+0.89	181	0.55	+0.16
ACT	Tim Kronfeld	185	0.57	−1.34	484	1.47	−3.84
United Future	Steven Dromgool	113	0.35	−0.06	193	0.58	−0.40
Libertarianz	Peter Linton	105	0.32	+0.10	37	0.11	+0.01
Māori Party					182	0.55	−0.09
Mana					103	0.31	+0.31
Alliance					10	0.03	+0.01
Democrats					10	0.03	−0.01
Informal votes		480			173		
Total valid votes		32,344			33,030		
National hold	Majority	9,379	29.00	+2.09			

Electorate (as at 26 November 2011): 45,675

=== 2008 election ===
2008 general election: Northcote
Notes:	Blue background denotes the winner of the electorate vote. Pink background denotes a candidate elected from their party list. Yellow background denotes an electorate win by a list member, or other incumbent. A ✓ or ✗ denotes status of any incumbent, win or lose respectively.						
Party	Candidate	Votes	%	±%	Party votes	%	±%
National	✓ Jonathan Coleman	20,132	57.87		17,827	50.41	
Labour	Hamish McCracken	10,772	30.97		10,517	29.74	
Green	Jeanette Elley	2,046	5.88		2,368	6.70	
ACT	Nick Kearney	664	1.91		1,877	5.31	
Family Party	Angela Xu	549	1.58		148	0.42	
Progressive	Brenda Hill	199	0.57		299	0.85	
Kiwi	Barry McDonald	144	0.41		182	0.51	
United Future	Steven Dromgool	143	0.41		348	0.98	
Libertarianz	Peter Linton	77	0.22		37	0.10	
RAM	Benjamin Doherty	60	0.17		9	0.03	
NZ First					1,118	3.16	
Māori Party					227	0.64	
Bill and Ben					159	0.45	
Legalise Cannabis					138	0.39	
Pacific					72	0.20	
Democrats					13	0.04	
Workers Party					9	0.03	
Alliance					8	0.02	
RONZ					6	0.02	
Informal votes		246			107		
Total valid votes		34,786			35,362		
National hold	Majority	9,360	26.91				

=== 2005 election ===
2005 general election: Northcote
Notes:	Blue background denotes the winner of the electorate vote. Pink background denotes a candidate elected from their party list. Yellow background denotes an electorate win by a list member, or other incumbent. A ✓ or ✗ denotes status of any incumbent, win or lose respectively.						
Party	Candidate	Votes	%	±%	Party votes	%	±%
National	Jonathan Coleman	16,854	49.36		14,927	43.01	
Labour	✗ Ann Hartley	14,471	42.38		13,573	39.11	
NZ First	Paul Manning	833	2.44		1,736	5.00	
Progressive	Grant Gillon	611	1.79		426	1.23	
ACT	Diane Dawson	435	1.27		921	2.65	
United Future	Beth Stone	389	1.14		826	2.38	
Destiny	Nigel Heslop	268	0.78		195	0.56	
Māori Party	Francis Wāka	227	0.66		145	0.42	
Libertarianz	Peter Linton	55	0.16		25	0.07	
Green					1,763	5.08	
Legalise Cannabis					73	0.21	
Christian Heritage					39	0.11	
Alliance					11	0.03	
99 MP					10	0.03	
Democrats					8	0.02	
Family Rights					8	0.02	
Direct Democracy					5	0.01	
One NZ					4	0.01	
RONZ					3	0.01	
Informal votes		389			826		
Total valid votes		34,143			34,707		
National gain from Labour	Majority	2,383	6.98				

=== 2002 election ===
2002 general election: Northcote
Notes:	Blue background denotes the winner of the electorate vote. Pink background denotes a candidate elected from their party list. Yellow background denotes an electorate win by a list member, or other incumbent. A ✓ or ✗ denotes status of any incumbent, win or lose respectively.						
Party	Candidate	Votes	%	±%	Party votes	%	±%
Labour	✓ Ann Hartley	12,455	40.40		12,040	38.67	
National	Jeremy Sole	9,831	31.88		6,687	21.48	
Progressive	Grant Gillon	2,530	8.20		754	2.42	
NZ First	John Riley	1,528	4.95		3,069	9.85	
Green	Rachel Mackintosh	1,294	4.19		1,983	6.36	
ACT	Dianne Dawson	1,255	4.07		3,161	10.15	
United Future	Sharee Adams	1,139	3.69		2,283	7.33	
Christian Heritage	Dirk Hoek	313	1.01		332	1.06	
Alliance	Solly Southwood	185	0.60		332	1.06	
ORNZ					221	0.70	
Legalise Cannabis					147	0.47	
One NZ					24	0.07	
Mana Māori					8	0.02	
NMP					6	0.01	
Informal votes		298			84		
Total valid votes		30,828			31,131		
Labour hold	Majority	2,624	8.51				

=== 1999 election ===
1999 general election: Northcote
Notes:	Blue background denotes the winner of the electorate vote. Pink background denotes a candidate elected from their party list. Yellow background denotes an electorate win by a list member, or other incumbent. A ✓ or ✗ denotes status of any incumbent, win or lose respectively.						
Party	Candidate	Votes	%	±%	Party votes	%	±%
Labour	Ann Hartley	10,081	31.70		11,334	35.89	
National	✗ Ian Revell	9,803	30.83		10,502	33.25	
Alliance	Grant Gillon	6,417	20.18		2,366	7.49	
ACT	Alex Wong	2,140	6.73		3,319	10.51	
Green	Jane Wells	1,224	3.84		1,459	4.62	
NZ First	John Bryant	613	1.92		1,020	3.23	
Christian Heritage	Mark Munroe	392	1.23		484	1.53	
Christian Democrats	Dave Perkin	320	1.00		400	1.26	
United NZ	Murray Callister	174	0.54		196	0.62	
Christians Against Abortion	Maria Matthews	81	0.25				
Natural Law	Tony Cornelissen	45	0.14		42	0.13	
Legalise Cannabis					235	0.74	
Libertarianz					60	0.19	
McGillicuddy Serious					47	0.14	
Animals First					45	0.13	
Republican					14	0.04	
NMP					11	0.03	
One NZ					9	0.02	
Mauri Pacific					8	0.02	
People's Choice Party					6	0.01	
Freedom Movement					3	0.00	
Mana Māori					3	0.00	
South Island					3	0.00	
Informal votes		504			218		
Total valid votes		31,794			31,576		
Labour gain from National	Majority	278	0.87				

=== 1996 election ===
1996 general election: Northcote
Notes:	Blue background denotes the winner of the electorate vote. Pink background denotes a candidate elected from their party list. Yellow background denotes an electorate win by a list member, or other incumbent. A ✓ or ✗ denotes status of any incumbent, win or lose respectively.						
Party	Candidate	Votes	%	±%	Party votes	%	±%
National	Ian Revell	13,779	41.01		12,997	38.49	
Labour	Ann Hartley	9,216	27.43		8,267	24.48	
Alliance	Grant Gillon	3,923	11.68		3,078	9.11	
NZ First	Janie Phillips	2,875	8.56		3,227	9.56	
United NZ	✗ Peter Hilt	1,955	5.82		455	1.35	
ACT	Kieran Bird	1,235	3.68		3,467	10.27	
McGillicuddy Serious	Bernard Smith	235	0.70		83	0.25	
Progressive Green	Peter Lee	213	0.63		110	0.33	
Green Society	Merete Molving	100	0.30		32	0.09	
Natural Law	Kevin O'Brien	52	0.15		49	0.15	
Republican	Pamera Warner	15	0.04				
Christian Coalition					1,318	3.90	
Legalise Cannabis					451	1.34	
Ethnic Minority Party					119	0.35	
Animals First					54	0.16	
Superannuitants & Youth					26	0.08	
Libertarianz					19	0.06	
Conservatives					7	0.02	
Mana Māori					5	0.01	
Asia Pacific United					4	0.01	
Advance New Zealand					2	0.01	
Te Tawharau					0	0.00	
Informal votes		263			91		
Total valid votes		33,598			33,770		
National win new seat	Majority	4,563	13.58				
