= 49th New Zealand Parliament =

Term of the Parliament of New Zealand

49th Parliament of New Zealand
←	48th Parliament	50th Parliament	→
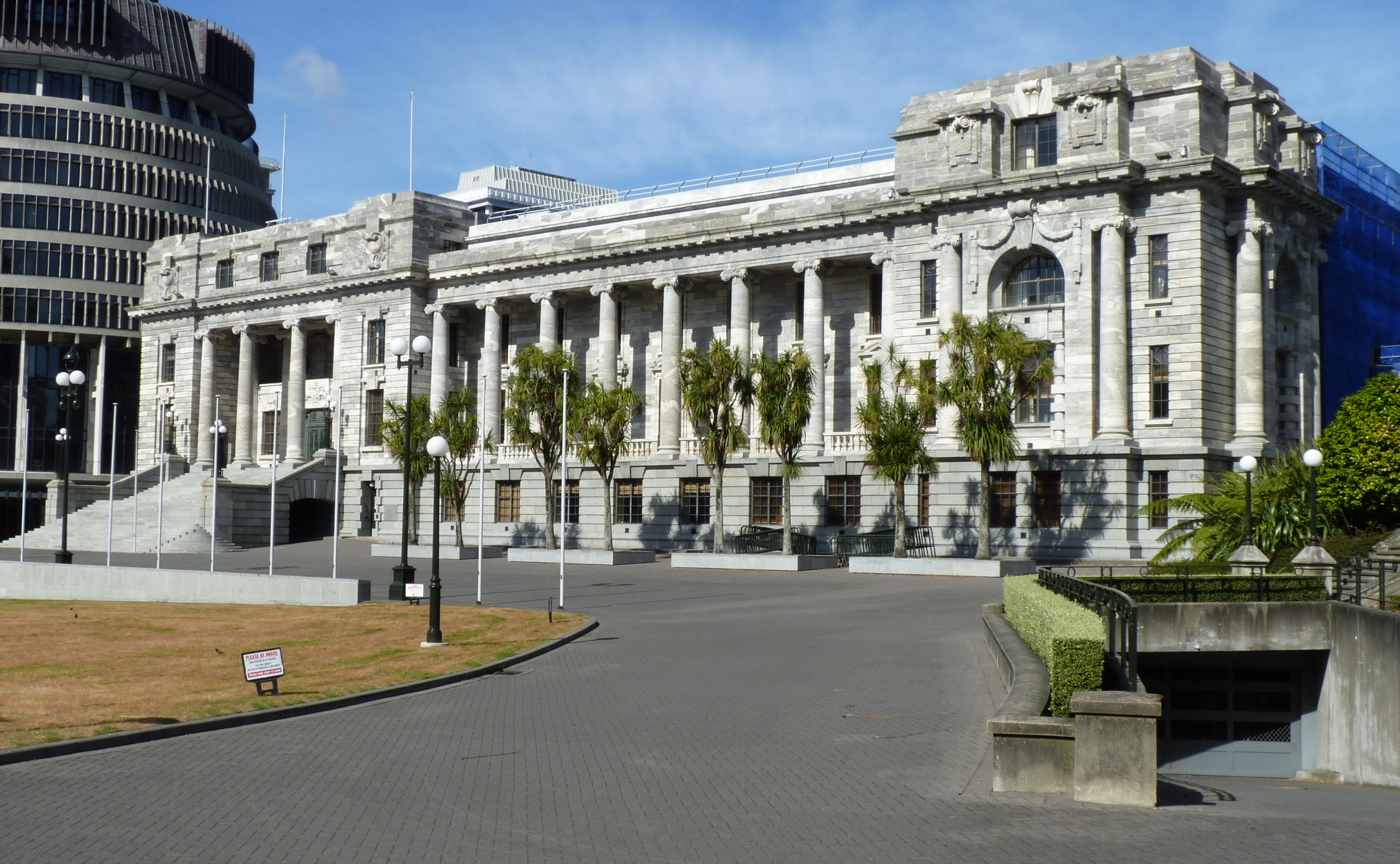
- Parliament House, Wellington

Overview
- Legislative body: New Zealand Parliament
- Term: 8 December 2008 – 20 October 2011
- Election: 2008 New Zealand general election
- Government: Fifth National Government

House of Representatives
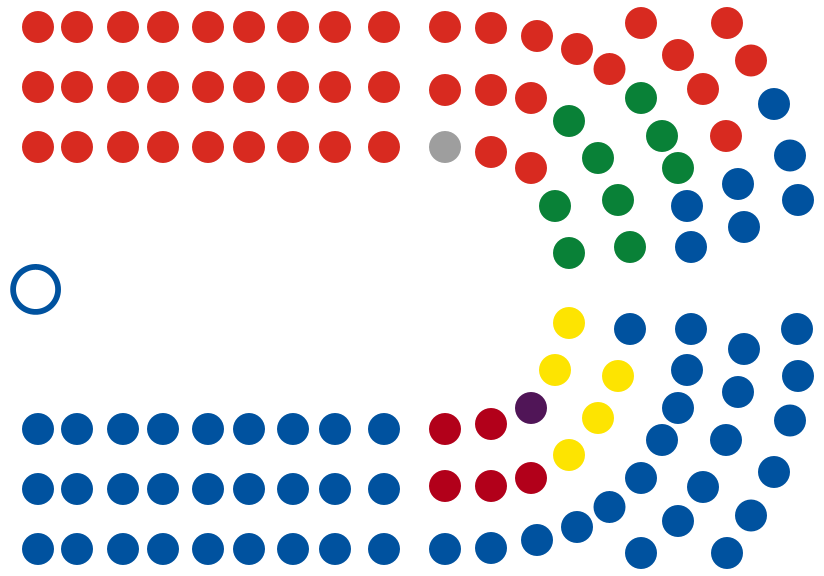
- Members: 122
- Speaker of the House: Lockwood Smith
- Leader of the House: Gerry Brownlee
- Prime Minister: John Key
- Leader of the Opposition: Phil Goff

Sovereign
- Monarch: Elizabeth II
- Governor-General: Anand Satyanand

The 49th New Zealand Parliament was elected at the 2008 election. It comprised 122 members, including an overhang of two seats (an increase of one from the 48th Parliament) caused by the Māori Party having won two more electorate seats than its share of the party vote would otherwise have given it. The Parliament served from December 2008 until the November 2011 election.

New Zealand uses the mixed-member proportional (MMP) system to elect its parliaments. Seventy of the members of the 49th Parliament represented geographical electorates: sixteen in the South Island, 47 in the North Island (one more than for the 48th Parliament) and seven Māori electorates. The remaining 52 (increased from fifty by the overhang) were elected from nationwide party vote candidate lists to realise proportionality.

There were 10 resignations leading to Electoral Commission replacement selections for new list candidates from four parliamentary parties. Lockwood Smith was the Speaker in the 49th Parliament.

== Electorate boundaries for 49th Parliament ==
The Representation Commission altered many of the boundaries of New Zealand's parliamentary electorates following the 2006 census; the large growth in population between censuses lead to significant boundary changes, particularly in Auckland, the area around Christchurch and the central North Island. In May 2007, the Representation Commission announced the boundary changes to take effect for the next general election, with the boundaries finalised in September 2007.

The Commission announced the formation of a new electorate in Greater Auckland, bringing the number of geographical constituencies to 70. The new electorate, originally dubbed "Howick" (after the Auckland suburb), would have included parts of the existing Pakuranga, Manukau East and Clevedon electorates. After Pakuranga electors strongly objected to the proposed changes (which would have seen the inclusion of the population centres Panmure, Point England and Glen Innes into the electorate) the Commission largely reverted proposed changes to the boundaries of the Pakuranga electorate. The Commission opted to alleviate population pressures by moving the Auckland City suburb of Otahuhu into Manukau East. The revised new electorate received the name Botany to reflect its focus on the growing population-centres of Botany Downs–Dannemora. On paper, Botany counts as a safe National seat.

Even though the number of South Island electorates remains fixed, the decline in the population of electorates south of Christchurch resulted in the boundaries of electorates from Invercargill north to Rakaia shifting northwards. The electorates of Aoraki, Otago, Rakaia and Banks Peninsula all gravitated towards Christchurch. In the process:

- Aoraki received the new name of Rangitata
- Otago received the new name of Waitaki
- Rakaia received the new name of Selwyn
- Banks Peninsula received the new name of Port Hills

Other electorates in the lower South Island increased substantially in size.

== 2008 election results ==
The figures below are based on official results A decrease of 7 MPs is shown for "Other Parties" because the New Zealand First party of Winston Peters did not win an electorate seat or 5% of the party vote, and hence was not allocated any seats in the new Parliament.

Summary of the 8 November 2008 election for the House of Representatives
Party	Party vote			Electorate vote			Seats			
Party	Votes	%	Change (pp)	Votes	%	Change (pp)	List	Electorate	Total	+/-
National	1,053,398	44.93	▲5.83	1,072,024	46.60	▲6.22	17	41	58	▲10
Labour	796,880	33.99	▼7.11	810,238	35.22	▼5.13	22	21	43	▼7
Green	157,613	6.72	▲1.42	129,584	5.63	▲1.51	9	0	9	▲3
ACT	85,496	3.65	▲2.14	68,852	2.99	▲1.02	4	1	5	▲3
Māori Party	55,980	2.39	▲0.27	76,836	3.34	▼0.02	0	5	5	▲1
Progressive	21,241	0.91	▼0.25	25,981	1.13	▼0.51	0	1	1	Steady
United Future	20,497	0.87	▼1.80	25,955	1.13	▼1.71	0	1	1	▼2
NZ First	95,356	4.07	▼1.65	38,813	1.69	▼1.80	0	0	0	▼7
Bill and Ben	13,016	0.56	new	—	—	—	0	0	0	new
Kiwi	12,755	0.54	new	15,528	0.68	new	0	0	0	new
Legalise Cannabis	9,515	0.41	▲0.16	3,884	0.17	▲0.05		0	0	Steady
Pacific	8,640	0.37	new	9,714	0.42	new	0	0	0	new
Family Party	8,176	0.35	new	9,214	0.40	new	0	0	0	new
Alliance	1,909	0.08	▲0.01	1,885	0.08	▼0.01	0	0	0	Steady
Democrats	1,208	0.05	Steady	1,758	0.08	▲0.05	0	0	0	Steady
Libertarianz	1,176	0.05	▲0.01	1,739	0.08	▲0.05	0	0	0	Steady
Workers Party	932	0.04	new	480	0.02	new	0	0	0	new
RAM	465	0.02	new	1,213	0.05	new		0	0	new
RONZ	313	0.01	new	192	0.01	new		0	0	new
Unregistered parties	—	—	—	1,363	0.06	▼0.01		0	0	Steady
Independent	—	—	—	5,013	0.53	▼0.31	0	–	0	Steady
Valid votes	2,344,566	98.66	▼0.11	2,300,266	96.79	▼0.2				
Informal vote	11,970	0.50	▲0.04	25,332	1.07	▼0.01				
Disallowed votes	19,944	0.84	▲0.07	50,882	2.14	▲0.26				
Below electoral threshold	153,461	6.46		—	—	—				
Total	2,376,480	100		2,376,480	100		52	70	122	▲1
Eligible voters and turnout	2,990,759	79.46	▼1.46	2,990,759	79.46	▼1.46				

== Overview of seats ==
The table below shows the number of MPs in each party following the 2008 election and at dissolution:

Affiliation	Members	
Affiliation	At 2008 election	At dissolution
National	58	58
ACT ^{CS}	5	5
Māori Party ^{CS}	5	4
United Future ^{CS}	1	1
Government total	69	68
Labour	43	42
Green	9	9
Progressive	1	1
Independent	0	1
Mana	Not yet founded	1 ^{[1]}
Opposition total	53	54
Total	122	122
Working Government majority ^{[2]}	16	15

Notes

- ^CS ACT New Zealand, United Future and Māori Party supported the National minority government on a confidence and supply basis.
- ^{1} Hone Harawira resigned from the Māori Party after that party's disciplinary committee recommended his expulsion. He had been vocal in his opposition to the Māori Party's position on the foreshore and seabed issue.
- ^{2} The Working Government majority is calculated as all Government MPs less all other parties.

== Members of the 49th New Zealand Parliament ==
=== New Zealand National Party (58) ===
Name	Electorate	Term in office	Portfolios & Responsibilities
Lockwood Smith	Rodney	1984 –	Speaker of the House; Chair of the Business select committee; Chair of the Officers of Parliament select committee; Chair of the Standing Orders select committee
Lindsay Tisch	Waikato	1999 –	Deputy Speaker; Deputy chair of the Officers of Parliament select committee
Eric Roy	Invercargill	1993–2002; 2005 –	Assistant Speaker
Ministers in Cabinet
John Key	Helensville	2002 –	Prime Minister; Minister of Tourism; Minister in Charge of Ministerial Services; Minister in Charge of the NZ Security Intelligence Service; Minister Responsible for the Government Communications Security Bureau (GCSB); Leader of the National Party
Bill English	Clutha-Southland	1990 –	Deputy Prime Minister; Minister of Finance; Minister for Infrastructure; Deputy Leader of the National Party
Gerry Brownlee	Ilam	1996 –	Leader of the House; Minister for Economic Development; Minister of Energy and Resources; Minister of Earthquake Recovery; Associate Minister for the Rugby World Cup; Deputy Chair of the Privileges Committee
Simon Power	Rangitīkei	1999 –	Minister of Justice; Minister for State Owned Enterprises; Minister of Commerce; Minister Responsible for the Law Commission; Minister of Consumer Affairs; Associate Minister of Finance; Deputy Leader of the House
Tony Ryall	Bay of Plenty	1990 –	Minister of Health; Minister of State Services
Nick Smith	Nelson	1990 –	Minister for the Environment; Minister for Climate Change Issues; Minister for ACC
Judith Collins	Papakura	2002 –	Minister of Police; Minister of Corrections; Minister of Veterans’ Affairs
Anne Tolley	East Coast	1999–2002; 2005 –	Minister of Education; Minister Responsible for the Education Review Office
Chris Finlayson		2005 –	Attorney-General; Minister for Treaty of Waitangi Negotiations; Minister for Arts, Culture and Heritage
David Carter		1994 byelection –	Minister of Agriculture; Minister for Biosecurity; Minister of Forestry
Murray McCully	East Coast Bays	1987 –	Minister of Foreign Affairs; Minister for Sport and Recreation; Minister for the Rugby World Cup
Tim Groser		2005 –	Minister of Trade; Associate Minister of Foreign Affairs; Associate Minister for Climate Change Issues (International Negotiations)
Wayne Mapp	North Shore	1996 –	Minister of Defence; Minister of Research, Science and Technology; Associate Minister for Economic Development; Associate Minister for Tertiary Education
Steven Joyce		2008 –	Minister of Transport; Minister for Communications and Information Technology; Minister for Tertiary Education; Associate Minister of Finance; Associate Minister for Infrastructure
Georgina te Heuheu		1996 –	Minister for Courts; Minister of Pacific Island Affairs; Minister for Disarmament and Arms Control; Associate Minister of Maori Affairs
Paula Bennett	Waitakere	2005 –	Minister for Social Development and Employment; Minister of Youth Affairs
Phil Heatley	Whangarei	1999 –	Minister of Fisheries; Minister of Housing
Jonathan Coleman	Northcote	2005 –	Minister of Immigration; Minister of Broadcasting; Associate Minister of Tourism; Associate Minister of Health
Kate Wilkinson		2005 –	Minister of Conservation; Minister of Labour; Minister for Food Safety; Associate Minister of Immigration
Hekia Parata		2008 –	Minister of Ethnic Affairs; Minister of Women's Affairs; Associate Minister of Energy; Associate Minister of Community and Voluntary Sector; Associate Minister of ACC
Maurice Williamson	Pakuranga	1987 –	Minister for Building and Construction; Minister of Customs; Minister of Statistics; Minister for Small Business; Minister for Land Information
Nathan Guy	Ōtaki	2005 –	Minister of Internal Affairs; Minister Responsible for Archives New Zealand; Minister Responsible for the National Library; Associate Minister of Justice; Associate Minister of Transport
Craig Foss	Tukituki	2005 –	Minister of Civil Defence; Minister of Senior Citizens; Minister of Racing; Associate Minister for Local Government; Associate Minister of Commerce
Members of Parliament
Chris Tremain	Napier	2005 –	Senior Government Whip; Deputy Chair of the Finance and Expenditure select committee
Jo Goodhew	Rangitata	2005 –	Junior Government Whip; Former Chair of the Social Services select committee
Amy Adams	Selwyn	2008 –	Chairperson, Electoral Legislation Committee; Chair of the Finance and Expenditure Select Committee
Shane Ardern	Taranaki-King Country	1998 byelection –	Chair of the Primary Production select committee
Paul Hutchison	Hunua	1999 –	Chair of the Health select committee
Tau Henare		1993–1999; 2005 –	Chair of the Māori Affairs select committee; Deputy Chair Auckland Governance Select Committee
Sandra Goudie	Coromandel	2002 –	Chair of the Law and Order select committee
Chris Auchinvole	West Coast-Tasman	2005 –	Chair of the Local Government and Environment select committee
David Bennett	Hamilton East	2005 –	Chair of the Transport and Industrial Relations select committee
Chester Borrows	Whanganui	2005 –	Chair of the Justice and Electoral select committee
John Hayes	Wairarapa	2005 –	Chair of the Foreign Affairs, Defence and Trade select committee
Katrina Shanks		2007 –	Chair of the Social Services select committee
Jackie Blue		2005 –	Deputy chair of the Transport and Industrial Relations select committee
Jacqui Dean	Waitaki	2005 –	Deputy Chair of the Government Administration select committee; Deputy Chair of the Foreign Affairs, Defence and Trade select committee
Colin King	Kaikōura	2005 –	Deputy Chair of the Primary Production select committee
Nicky Wagner		2005 –	Deputy Chair of the Local Government and Environment select committee
Simon Bridges	Tauranga	2008 –	Deputy Chair of the Justice and Electoral select committee
Peseta Sam Lotu-Iiga	Maungakiekie	2008 –	Deputy Chair of the Commerce select committee
Todd McClay	Rotorua	2008 –	Deputy Chair of Social Services Select Committee
Nikki Kaye	Auckland Central	2008 –	Deputy Chair Government Administration Select Committee
Melissa Lee		2008 –	
Tim Macindoe	Hamilton West	2008 –	
Paul Quinn		2008 –	
Kanwal Singh Bakshi		2008 –	
Louise Upston	Taupō	2008 –	
Michael Woodhouse		2008 –	
Jonathan Young	New Plymouth	2008 –	
Aaron Gilmore		2008 –	
Cam Calder		June 2009–	
Jami-Lee Ross	Botany	February 2011–	
members of the National caucus who resigned, retired or died during the term of the 49th Parliament
Richard Worth		1999 – June 2009 (resigned)	succeeded by Cam Calder
Pansy Wong	Botany	1996 – 2011 (resigned)	succeeded by Jami-Lee Ross
John Carter	Northland	1987 – June 2011 (resigned)	Became High Commissioner to Cook Islands
Allan Peachey	Tāmaki	2005 – 6 November 2011 (died)	Chair of the Education and Science select committee

=== New Zealand Labour Party (42) ===
Name	Electorate	term in office	responsibilities
Phil Goff	Mount Roskill	1981–1990; 1993 –	Leader of the Opposition; Leader of the Labour Party; Shadow Minister in Charge of the NZ Security Intelligence Service
Annette King	Rongotai	1984–1990; 1993 –	Deputy Leader of the Opposition; Deputy Leader of the Labour Party
David Cunliffe	New Lynn	1999 –	Shadow Minister of Finance
Ruth Dyson	Port Hills	1993 –	Shadow Minister of Health; Deputy Chair of the Health select committee
Parekura Horomia	Ikaroa-Rāwhiti	1999 –	Shadow Minister of Maori Affairs; Shadow Minister of Fisheries
Clayton Cosgrove	Waimakariri	1999 –	Shadow Minister of Police; Shadow Minister of Corrections; Shadow Minister for State-Owned Enterprises; Associate Shadow Minister of Finance; Deputy chair of the Law and Order select committee
Chris Carter	Te Atatu	1993 –	Shadow Minister for Education; Shadow Minister of Ethnic Affairs
Maryan Street		2005 –	Shadow Minister of Trade; Shadow Minister for Tertiary Education
Nanaia Mahuta	Hauraki-Waikato	1996 –	Shadow Minister for the Environment; Shadow Minister of Tourism; Associate Shadow Minister of Maori Affairs
David Parker		2002 –	Shadow Attorney-General; Shadow Minister for Electoral Reform; Shadow Minister of ACC; Associate Shadow Minister of Finance; Chair of the Government Administration select committee
Shane Jones		2005 –	Shadow Minister of Local Government; Shadow Minister of Building and Construction; Shadow Minister for Infrastructure
Trevor Mallard	Hutt South	1984–1990; 1993 –	Shadow Minister of Labour; Shadow Minister for Economic Development and Employment; Shadow Minister for Sport and Recreation
Lianne Dalziel	Christchurch East	1990 –	Shadow Minister of Justice; Shadow Minister of Commerce; Chair of the Commerce select committee
Charles Chauvel		2006 –	Shadow Minister for Climate Change; Shadow Minister of Energy; Associate Shadow Minister of Commerce; Chair of the Regulations Review select committee; Chair of the Privileges Committee
Pete Hodgson	Dunedin North	1990 –	Shadow Minister of Immigration; Shadow Minister of Defence
Moana Mackey		2003 –	Shadow Minister for Rural Affairs; Shadow Minister for Research and Development; Shadow Minister for Science and Technology
Steve Chadwick		1999 –	Junior Whip; Shadow Minister for Conservation
Sue Moroney		2005 –	Shadow Minister for Women's Affairs; Shadow Minister for Early Childhood Education
Rick Barker		1993 –	Senior Whip; Shadow Minister for Courts; Shadow Minister of Veterans' Affairs
Ross Robertson	Manukau East	1987 –	Assistant Speaker; Deputy Chair of the Officers of Parliament select committee; Shadow Minister for Small Business; Shadow Minister for Senior Citizens; Shadow Minister for Racing; Associate Shadow Minister for Disarmament and Arms Control
George Hawkins	Manurewa	1990 –	Shadow Minister of Housing
Damien O'Connor		1993–2008; May 2009 -	Shadow Minister of Agriculture; Shadow Minister of Rural Affairs; Shadow Minister of Biosecurity
Mita Ririnui		1999 –	Shadow Minister of Forestry; Associate Shadow Minister of Treaty Negotiations; Associate Shadow Minister of Agriculture
Lynne Pillay		1999 –	Shadow Minister for Disability Issues; Associate Shadow Minister of Justice
Ashraf Choudhary		2002 –	Shadow Minister for Food Safety; Shadow Minister for Agricultural Science; Associate Shadow Minister for Ethnic Affairs
Darien Fenton		2005 –	Shadow Minister for Transport Safety; Associate Shadow Minister of Labour
William Sio	Mangere	April 2008 –	Shadow Minister of Customs; Associate Shadow Minister for Pacific Island Affairs; Associate Shadow Minister of Local Government
Jacinda Ardern		2008 –	Shadow Minister for Youth Affairs; Associate Shadow Minister of Justice
Carol Beaumont		2008 –	Shadow Minister for Consumer Affairs; Associate Shadow Minister of Labour
Brendon Burns	Christchurch Central	2008 –	Shadow Minister of Broadcasting; Associate Shadow Minister for the Environment
Clare Curran	Dunedin South	2008 –	Shadow Minister for Communication and IT
Kelvin Davis		2008 –	Shadow Minister for Biosecurity; Associate Shadow Minister of Education
Chris Hipkins	Rimutaka	2008 –	Shadow Minister of Internal Affairs; Associate Shadow Minister of Energy
Raymond Huo		2008 –	Shadow Minister Responsible for the Law Commission; Shadow Minister of Statistics; Associate Shadow Minister for Ethnic Affairs
Iain Lees-Galloway	Palmerston North	2008 –	Shadow Minister for Land Information; Associate Shadow Minister of Defence; Associate Shadow Minister of Health
Stuart Nash		2008 –	Shadow Minister of Revenue; Associate Shadow Minister of Trade; Associate Shadow Minister of Forestry
Rajen Prasad		2008 –	Shadow Minister for the Voluntary and Community Sector; Associate Shadow Minister for Ethnic Affairs; Associate Shadow Minister for Social Development and Employment
Grant Robertson	Wellington Central	2008 –	Shadow Minister of State Services; Associate Shadow Minister for Arts, Culture, and Heritage; Associate Shadow Minister of Foreign Affairs
Carmel Sepuloni		2008 –	Shadow Minister of Civil Defence; Associate Shadow Minister for Tertiary Education; Associate Shadow Minister for Social Development and Employment
Phil Twyford		2008 –	Shadow Minister for Disarmament and Arms Control; Shadow Minister for Auckland Issues; Associate Shadow Minister of Foreign Affairs
David Shearer	Mount Albert	June 2009 –	
Kris Faafoi	Mana	November 2010 –	
Louisa Wall		April 2011 –	
members of the Labour caucus who resigned or retired during the term of the 49th Parliament
Helen Clark	Mount Albert	1981 – 17 April 2009	resigned to become head of the United Nations Development Program; replaced by David Shearer
Michael Cullen		1981 – May 2009	replaced by Damien O'Connor
Winnie Laban	Mana	1999– October 2010	replaced by Kris Faafoi
Darren Hughes		2002 – April 2011	replaced by Louisa Wall

=== Green Party of Aotearoa New Zealand (9) ===
Name	Electorate	term in office	responsibilities
Metiria Turei		2002 –	Co-leader of the Green Party (May 2009–)
Russel Norman		2008 –	Co-leader of the Green Party
Kennedy Graham		2008 –	'Musterer' (party whip)
Sue Kedgley		1999 –	
Keith Locke		1999 –	
Catherine Delahunty		2008 –	
Kevin Hague		2008 –	
David Clendon		2009 –	
Gareth Hughes		2010 –	
members of the Greens caucus who retired during the term of the 49th Parliament
Sue Bradford		1999–2009	
Jeanette Fitzsimons		1996–2010	Co-leader of the Green Party (1995–2009)

=== ACT New Zealand (5) ===
Name	Electorate	term in office	responsibilities
Rodney Hide	Epsom	1996 –	Minister of Local Government; Minister for Regulatory Reform; Associate Minister of Education
John Boscawen		2008 –	Parliamentary Leader of the ACT Party
Heather Roy		2002 –	
Roger Douglas		1969–1990; 2008 –	
Hilary Calvert		2010 –	Party Whip
members of the ACT caucus who resigned or retired during the term of the 49th Parliament
David Garrett		2008–2010	

=== Māori Party (4) ===
Name	Electorate	term in office	responsibilities
Tariana Turia	Te Tai Hauāuru	1996–2014	Minister for the Community and Voluntary Sector; Associate Minister of Health; Associate Minister of Social Development and Employment; Minister for Disability Issues; Co-leader of the Māori Party
Pita Sharples	Tāmaki Makaurau	2005–2011	Minister of Maori Affairs; Associate Minister of Education; Associate Minister of Corrections; Co-leader of the Māori Party
Te Ururoa Flavell	Waiāriki	2005–2017	Party whip
Rahui Katene	Te Tai Tonga	2008–2011	
members of the Māori Party caucus who resigned or retired during the term of the 49th Parliament
Hone Harawira	Te Tai Tokerau	2008–2011	

=== United Future New Zealand (1) ===
Name	Electorate	term in office	responsibilities
Peter Dunne	Ōhariu	1984–2017	Minister of Revenue; Associate Minister of Health; Deputy Chair of the Emissions Trading Scheme Review committee; Deputy Chair Standing Orders Select Committee; Parliamentary Leader of United Future Party

=== Jim Anderton's Progressive Party (1) ===
Name	Electorate	term in office	responsibilities
Jim Anderton	Wigram	1984 –	Parliamentary Leader of Progressive Party; Father of the House; Former Shadow Minister of Agriculture

=== Mana Party (1) ===
Name	Electorate	term in office	responsibilities
Hone Harawira	Te Tai Tokerau	2011 –	*Note: Previously sat until 20 May 2011, resumed his seat on 2 August 2011

=== Independent (1) ===
Name	Electorate	term in office	responsibilities
Chris Carter	Te Atatū	1993–1996; 1999 –	Former Deputy chair of the Education and Science select committee; Permanently Expelled from Labour Party Caucus and Party membership; Note: did not retain membership of any select committee positions during expulsion

== By-elections during 49th Parliament ==
There were a number of changes during the term of the 49th Parliament.

Electorate and by-election		Date	Incumbent	Cause	Winner
Mount Albert	2009	13 June	Helen Clark	Resignation; appointed to the UNDP	David Shearer
Mana	2010	20 November	Winnie Laban	Resignation	Kris Faafoi
Botany	2011	5 March	Pansy Wong	Resignation	Jami-Lee Ross
Te Tai Tokerau	2011	25 June	Hone Harawira	Resignation; established the Mana Movement	Hone Harawira

=== Summary of changes during term ===
- Helen Clark resigned in April 2009 to take up a position as Administrator of the United Nations Development Programme. The resulting Mount Albert by-election was won by David Shearer on 13 June 2009.
- Michael Cullen resigned in April 2009 to become the deputy chairman of New Zealand Post. He was replaced by the next person on the Labour Party's list, Damien O'Connor.
- Richard Worth resigned in June 2009. He was replaced by the next person on the National Party's list, Cam Calder.
- Sue Bradford resigned in October 2009. She was replaced by the next person on the Green Party's list, David Clendon.
- Jeanette Fitzsimons resigned in February 2010. She was replaced by the next person on the Green Party's list, Gareth Hughes.
- Chris Carter expelled from Labour Party caucus amidst expenses scandal in 2010 and, as of October 2010, was expelled from the Labour Party meaning his seat is one as solely an independent MP.
- David Garrett resigned from the ACT caucus in September 2010 and resigned from Parliament shortly after being replaced by Hilary Calvert.
- Luamanuvao Winnie Laban resigned in October 2010 to become Assistant Vice-Chancellor (Pasifika) at Victoria University of Wellington. The resulting Mana by-election was won by Kris Faafoi.
- Pansy Wong resigned in January 2011 following questions and a Speaker's investigation into her use of Ministerial travel privileges. Her portfolios were transferred to Hekia Parata who was raised to Cabinet to replace her. The resulting Botany by-election was won by Jami-Lee Ross.
- Hone Harawira resigned from the Māori Party in February 2011 following a recommendation by the party's Disciplinary and Disputes Committee that the party's National Council expel him. He resigned from Parliament as an independent MP effective 21 May causing a by-election in Te Tai Tokerau. Harawira announced his intention to run as a candidate for the Mana Party. On 6 July 2011 the results of the official count of votes found Harawira won by a majority of 1117.
- Darren Hughes announced his intention to resign in March 2011 following an alleged incident involving him. Louisa Wall became the replacement for Hughes from the List for the remainder of the 49th Parliament.
- John Carter announced his resignation from politics in June 2011 in favour of a High Commissioner's post in the Cook Islands; he was replaced as a Minister by Craig Foss. As he resigned within six months of a general election, a by-election does not need to be held in his Northland seat.

== Seating plan ==
=== As on 5 May 2009 ===
The chamber is in a horseshoe-shape.

													Nash	Sepuloni	Prasad	Twyford	Vacant
Barker	Sio	Pillay	Choudhary	Fenton	J. Ardern	Beaumont	Burns	Hawkins	Curran	Davis	Hipkins	Huo	Lees-Galloway	Delahunty		G. Robertson	Young
Mackey	Mahuta	Chadwick	Hughes	Dalziel	Chauvel	Hodgson	Laban	Moroney	R. Robertson	O'Connor	Ririnui	Kedgley	Turei		Hague	Parata	Woodhouse
C. Carter	Mallard	A. King	Goff	Cunliffe	Dyson	Horomia	Cosgrove	Street	Anderton	Parker	Jones	Norman		Bradford	Locke	McClay	Upston
													Fitzsimons	Graham	Hayes
L. Smith															Peachey
L. Smith															Borrows
													Hide	Foss	D. Bennett
Finlayson	Tolley	English	KEY	Brownlee	Power	Ryall	N. Smith	Collins	Sharples	Turia	Dunne	H. Roy		Douglas	Goodhew	Lotu-liga	Quinn
Joyce	McCully	Tremain	Guy	D. Carter	Groser	Mapp	P. Bennett	te Heuheu	Harawira	Flavell	Katene	Garrett	Boscawen		Auchinvole	Lee	Gilmore
E. Roy	Tisch	Wong	Heatley	Wilkinson	Williamson	J. Carter	Worth	Coleman	S. Ardern	Hutchison	Henare	C. King	Goudie	Wagner	Kaye	Dean	Bridges
													Blue	Shanks	Macindoe	Bakshi	Adams

=== End of term ===
The chamber is in a horseshoe-shape.

													Wall	Hodgson	Pillay	Harawira	C. Carter
R. Robertson	Mahuta	O'Connor	Fenton	Shearer	Nash	Hipkins	Davis	Burns	Hawkins	Lees-Galloway	Prasad	Sepuloni	Faafoi	G. Hughes	Choudhary	Ririnui	Ross
Mackey	Twyford	Chadwick	Barker	Jones	Moroney	Dalziel	Sio	J. Ardern	Beaumont	Curran	Huo	Hague	Locke		Clendon	Bakshi	Calder
Horomia	Mallard	A. King	Goff	Cunliffe	Parker	Dyson	Cosgrove	Street	Anderton	Chauvel	G. Robertson	Norman		Kedgley	Delahunty	McClay	Young
													Turei	Graham
L. Smith															Hayes
L. Smith															Peachey
													Hide	Foss	Blue
Finlayson	Tolley	English	KEY	Brownlee	Power	Ryall	N. Smith	Collins	Sharples	Turia	Dunne	Boscawen		Douglas	Borrows	Macindoe	Woodhouse
Joyce	McCully	Goodhew	Tremain	D. Carter	Groser	Mapp	P. Bennett	te Heuheu	Hutchison	Flavell	Katene	H. Roy	Calvert		D. Bennett	Lotu-liga	Upston
E. Roy	Tisch	Heatley	Wilkinson	Coleman	Parata	Williamson	J. Carter	Guy	S. Ardern	Henare	C. King	Goudie	Wagner	Auchinvole	Dean	Lee	Quinn
													Shanks	Kaye	Adams	Bridges	Gilmore
