= Mana (electorate) =

- Single-member general constituency for the New Zealand House of Representatives
- Formation: 1996
- Region: Wellington
- Character: Urban and suburban
- Term: 3 years

Member for Mana

Mana was a New Zealand electorate, returning a single member to the New Zealand House of Representatives. The final MP for Mana was Barbara Edmonds of the Labour Party. She held this position from the 2020 general election to the 2026 election. The electorate was abolished ahead of the 2026 general election.

== Population centres ==
The Mana electorate was centred on Porirua city and included the southern Kapiti Coast district. As of 2025, its boundaries extended from the north Wellington suburb of Linden to the southern edge of the Kapiti Coast Airport. The western boundary was with the Remutaka electorate, running through the Akatarawa Forest and abutting the Hutt South electorate at Boulder Hill.

Population centres within the electorate included Paraparaumu (south of the airport, and east of the railway), Raumati Beach, Raumati South, Paekākāriki, Pukerua Bay, Karehana Bay, Plimmerton, Mana, Camborne, Paremata, Whitby, Pāuatahanui, Porirua and Linden.

== History ==
The electorate was created for the introduction of mixed-member proportional (MMP) representation in 1996 from the Porirua electorate and from the southern part of the Kapiti electorate, consisting of Paraparaumu south of the airport, Raumati South and Raumati Beach. The 1996 election was won by Labour's Graham Kelly, who was member for the former Porirua electorate.

The electorate was expanded slightly in the 2007 boundary redistribution when parts of Paraparaumu located east of State Highway 1 (now Old State Highway 1) were added from neighbouring Ōtaki. The boundaries went unchanged in the 2013/14 and 2020 redistributions.

Labour members have won the seat in every election. The closest result was in the 2010 Mana by-election where Kris Faafoi succeeded Luamanuvao Winnie Laban and National Party candidate Hekia Parata came second by a margin of 1,080 votes.

The 2025 boundary review required a reduction in North Island electorates by one to reflect nationwide population shifts. The three Wellington City electorates (Rongotai, Wellington Central and Ōhāriu) were all underpopulated. All were abolished with flow-on effects for the wider region. The Mana and Ōtaki electorates were also abolished, with the population of Mana being redistributed to Kenepuru and Kapiti.

=== Members of Parliament ===
Unless otherwise stated, all MPs' terms began and ended at a general election.

Key

Labour National Green

Election	Winner
1996 election	Graham Kelly
1999 election	Graham Kelly
2002 election	Winnie Laban
2005 election	Winnie Laban
2008 election	Winnie Laban
2010 by-election	Kris Faafoi
2011 election	Kris Faafoi
2014 election	Kris Faafoi
2017 election	Kris Faafoi
2020 election	Barbara Edmonds
2023 election	Barbara Edmonds
(Electorate abolished in 2026; see Kenepuru)

=== List MPs ===
Members of Parliament elected from party lists in elections where that person also unsuccessfully contested the Mana electorate. Unless otherwise stated, all MPs' terms began and ended at general elections.

Election	Winner
2005 election	Chris Finlayson
2008 election	Hekia Parata^{1}
2011 election	Jan Logie^{1}
2011 election	Hekia Parata
2014 election	Jan Logie
2014 election	Hekia Parata
2017 election	Jan Logie
2020 election	Jan Logie
2023 election	Andy Foster

^{1} Also contested 2010 by-election

== Election results ==
=== 2023 election ===
2023 general election: Mana
Notes:	Blue background denotes the winner of the electorate vote. Pink background denotes a candidate elected from their party list. Yellow background denotes an electorate win by a list member, or other incumbent. A ✓ or ✗ denotes status of any incumbent, win or lose respectively.						
Party	Candidate	Votes	%	±%	Party votes	%	±%
Labour	✓ Barbara Edmonds	20,197	48.56	−12.01	16,016	38.05	−20.12
National	Frances Hughes	12,825	30.83	+7.93	12,084	28.70	+10.34
Green	Gina Dao-McLay	4,200	10.09	+0.50	6,297	14.96	+5.32
NZ First	Andy Foster	1,849	4.44	—	2,215	5.26	+3.06
ACT	Lily Brown	1,195	2.87	—	2,250	5.34	−0.19
NZ Loyal	Lisa Temperton	586	1.40	—	300	0.71	—
Independent	Kush Bhargava	188	0.45	—			
Not A Party	Richard Goode	105	0.25	−0.09			
Opportunities					1,158	2.75	+0.78
Te Pāti Māori					792	1.88	+1.32
NewZeal					275	0.65	−0.11
Legalise Cannabis					161	0.38	+0.04
Freedoms NZ					110	0.26	—
Animal Justice					86	0.20	—
DemocracyNZ					52	0.12	—
New Conservative					46	0.10	−0.88
Women's Rights					46	0.10	—
New Nation					17	0.04	—
Leighton Baker Party					13	0.03	—
Informal votes		446			173		
Total valid votes		41,591			42,091		
Labour hold	Majority	7,372	17.72	+19.95			

=== 2020 election ===
2020 general election: Mana
Notes:	Blue background denotes the winner of the electorate vote. Pink background denotes a candidate elected from their party list. Yellow background denotes an electorate win by a list member, or other incumbent. A ✓ or ✗ denotes status of any incumbent, win or lose respectively.						
Party	Candidate	Votes	%	±%	Party votes	%	±%
Labour	Barbara Edmonds	26,122	60.57	+1.21	25,271	58.17	+12.64
National	Jo Hayes	9,878	22.90	−7.76	7,976	18.36	−18.25
Green	Jan Logie	4,135	9.59	+1.72	4,187	9.64	+1.77
New Conservative	Roy Barry	522	1.21	—	425	0.98	+0.84
ONE	Stephanie Harawira	378	0.88	—	233	0.54	—
Advance NZ	Edward Ponder	369	0.86	—	349	0.80	—
Integrity	Helen Cartwright	360	0.83	—			
Progressive Aotearoa	Michael Walker	120	0.28	—			
Independent	Gordon Marshall	119	0.28	−0.28			
Not A Party	Richard Goode	69	0.16	−0.13			
Attica	Mike Iles	64	0.15	—			
ACT					2,403	5.53	+5.21
NZ First					954	2.20	−2.75
Opportunities					857	1.97	−1.39
Māori Party					242	0.56	+0.12
Legalise Cannabis					148	0.34	+0.07
Vision New Zealand					55	0.13	—
Outdoors					22	0.05	+0.01
Sustainable NZ					20	0.05	—
Social Credit					12	0.03	+0.01
TEA					6	0.01	—
Heartland					4	0.01	—
Informal votes		991			278		
Total valid votes		43,127			43,442		
Turnout		43,644	84.26	+1.27			
Labour hold	Majority	16,244	37.67	+8.97			

=== 2017 election ===
2017 general election: Mana
Notes:	Blue background denotes the winner of the electorate vote. Pink background denotes a candidate elected from their party list. Yellow background denotes an electorate win by a list member, or other incumbent. A ✓ or ✗ denotes status of any incumbent, win or lose respectively.						
Party	Candidate	Votes	%	±%	Party votes	%	±%
Labour	✓ Kris Faafoi	22,709	59.36	+5.14	17,831	45.53	+11.38
National	Euon Murrell	11,729	30.66	−1.62	14,305	36.61	−3.75
Green	Jan Logie	3,011	7.87	−0.47	3,076	7.87	−4.88
ACT	Shan Ng	264	0.69	—	125	0.32	+0.11
United Future	Kelleigh Sheffield-Cranstoun	219	0.57	—	41	0.10	−0.21
Independent	Gordon Marshall	214	0.56	—			
Not A Party	Richard Goode	112	0.29	−0.81 (Note: Richard Goode contested the electorate in 2014 as a candidate for the Aotearoa Legalise Cannabis Party)			
NZ First					1,936	4.95	−1.82
Opportunities					1,311	3.36	—
Māori Party					173	0.44	−0.17
Legalise Cannabis					107	0.27	−0.20
Conservative					54	0.14	−2.52
Mana Party					47	0.12	−0.83 (Note: 2017 Mana Party swing is relative to the votes for Internet-Mana in 2014; it shared a party list with the Internet Party in the 2014 election)
People's Party					24	0.06	—
Ban 1080					19	0.05	−0.01
Outdoors					16	0.04	—
Democrats					7	0.02	−0.05
Internet					4	0.01	−0.94 (Note: 2017 Internet Party swing is relative to the votes for Internet-Mana in 2014; it shared a party list with Mana Party in the 2014 election)
Informal votes		484			188		
Total valid votes		38,258			39,076		
Turnout		39,310					
Labour hold	Majority	10,980	28.70	+6.75			

=== 2014 election ===
2014 general election: Mana
Notes:	Blue background denotes the winner of the electorate vote. Pink background denotes a candidate elected from their party list. Yellow background denotes an electorate win by a list member, or other incumbent. A ✓ or ✗ denotes status of any incumbent, win or lose respectively.						
Party	Candidate	Votes	%	±%	Party votes	%	±%
Labour	✓ Kris Faafoi	19,651	54.81	+6.20	12,601	34.39	−3.37
National	Hekia Parata	11,698	32.27	−9.34	14,850	40.53	+0.58
Green	Jan Logie	3,024	8.43	+0.54	4,691	12.80	+0.03
Conservative	Roy Barry	980	2.73	—	977	2.66	+0.91
Legalise Cannabis	Richard Goode	403	1.11	+0.14	173	0.47	−0.02
Democrats	Ron England	96	0.27	—	24	0.07	+0.04
NZ First					2,493	6.80	+1.96
Internet Mana					351	0.96	+0.48 (Note: 2014 Internet Mana swing is relative to the votes for Mana in 2011; it shared a party list with Internet in the 2014 election)
Māori Party					226	0.62	−0.04
United Future					116	0.32	−0.36
ACT					79	0.22	−0.26
Civilian					28	0.07	—
Ban 1080					21	0.05	—
Independent Coalition					5	0.01	—
Focus					3	0.01	—
Informal votes		393			155		
Total valid votes		36,245			36,793		
Turnout		36,793	80.92	+3.37			
Labour hold	Majority	7,953	22.18	+15.54			

=== 2011 election ===
2011 general election: Mana
Notes:	Blue background denotes the winner of the electorate vote. Pink background denotes a candidate elected from their party list. Yellow background denotes an electorate win by a list member, or other incumbent. A ✓ or ✗ denotes status of any incumbent, win or lose respectively.						
Party	Candidate	Votes	%	±%	Party votes	%	±%
Labour	✓ Kris Faafoi	16,323	48.61	−4.45	12,999	37.76	−6.15
National	Hekia Parata	14,093	41.97	+6.98	13,754	39.95	+3.28
Green	Jan Logie	2,652	7.90	+1.18	4,398	12.78	+4.39
Legalise Cannabis	Richard Goode	332	0.99	+0.80 (Note: Richard Goode contested the electorate in 2008 as a candidate for the Libertarianz Party)	168	0.49	+0.10
ACT	Michael Warren	182	0.54	−1.30	163	0.47	−1.89
NZ First					1,667	4.84	+1.87
Conservative					604	1.75	—
United Future					234	0.68	−0.64
Māori Party					227	0.66	−0.37
Mana					165	0.48	—
Libertarianz					20	0.06	+0.01
Alliance					16	0.05	0.00
Democrats					10	0.03	+0.01
Informal votes		740			375		
Total valid votes		33,582			34,425		
Labour hold	Majority	2,230	6.64	−11.43			

Electorate (as at 26 November 2011): 44,393

=== 2010 by-election ===
2010 Mana by-election
Notes: Blue background denotes the winner of the by-election. Pink background denotes a candidate elected from their party list prior to the by-election. Yellow background denotes the winner of the by-election, who was a list MP prior to the by-election. A ✓ or ✗ denotes status of any incumbent, win or lose respectively.
Party	Candidate	Votes	%	±%
Labour	Kris Faafoi	10,980	47.17	-5.89
National	Hekia Parata	9,574	41.13	+6.14
Green	Jan Logie	1,543	6.62	−0.09
Independent	Matt McCarten	849	3.65	−
ACT	Colin du Plessis	136	0.58	−1.26
Legalise Cannabis	Julian Crawford	112	0.48	−
Libertarianz	Sean Fitzpatrick	46	0.20	+0.01
Alliance	Kelly Buchanan	37	0.16	−
Informal votes		37		
Total Valid votes		23,277		
Labour hold	Majority	1,406	6.04	-12.03

=== 2008 election ===
2008 general election: Mana
Notes:	Blue background denotes the winner of the electorate vote. Pink background denotes a candidate elected from their party list. Yellow background denotes an electorate win by a list member, or other incumbent. A ✓ or ✗ denotes status of any incumbent, win or lose respectively.						
Party	Candidate	Votes	%	±%	Party votes	%	±%
Labour	✓ Luamanuvao Winnie Laban	18,070	53.06	−0.16	15,209	43.91	−6.07
National	Hekia Parata	11,915	34.99	+3.14	12,701	36.67	+5.13
Green	Michael Gilchrist	2,288	6.72	+1.47	2,903	8.38	+2.15
ACT	Mike Collins	628	1.84	+0.59	819	2.36	+1.36
United Future	Robin Gunston	472	1.39	−2.45	458	1.32	−2.88
Kiwi	Renton MacLachlan	337	0.99	—	206	0.59	—
Pacific	Tim Salele'a Manu	282	0.83	—	189	0.55	—
Libertarianz	Richard Goode	64	0.19	—	17	0.05	+0.02
NZ First					1,029	2.97	−0.91
Māori Party					356	1.03	−0.04
Progressive					274	0.79	−0.21
Bill and Ben					213	0.61	—
Legalise Cannabis					133	0.38	+0.12
Family Party					85	0.25	—
Alliance					17	0.05	−0.10
Workers Party					15	0.04	—
Democrats					5	0.01	−0.01
RAM					5	0.01	—
RONZ					2	0.01	0.00
Informal votes		277			123		
Total valid votes		34,056			34,636		
Turnout		34,759					
Labour hold	Majority	6,155	18.07	−3.31			

=== 2005 election ===
—

2005 general election: Mana
Notes:	Blue background denotes the winner of the electorate vote. Pink background denotes a candidate elected from their party list. Yellow background denotes an electorate win by a list member, or other incumbent. A ✓ or ✗ denotes status of any incumbent, win or lose respectively.						
Party	Candidate	Votes	%	±%	Party votes	%	±%
Labour	✓ Luamanuvao Winnie Laban	16,763	53.22	+2.76	16,016	49.98	+2.46
National	Chris Finlayson	10,029	31.84	+3.45	10,108	31.54	+14.27
Green	Nicola Harvey	1,654	5.25	−1.97	1,995	6.23	−1,19
United Future	Robin Gunston	1,207	3.83	−1.92	1,346	4.20	−4.70
Destiny	Tala Leiasamaivao	518	1.64	—	224	0.70	—
Māori Party	Sonny Hosking	403	1.28	—	248	0.77	—
ACT	Michael Collins	395	1.25	−1.52	322	1.00	−5.18
Progressive	Fale Leleisiuao	291	0.92	−0.46	345	1.08	−0.83
Alliance	Kelly Buchanan	100	0.32	−1.10	49	0.15	−1.57
Direct Democracy	Jason Anderson	56	0.18	—	7	0.02	—
NZ First					1,244	3.88	−1.57
Legalise Cannabis					83	0.26	−0.36
Christian Heritage					22	0.07	−1.15
Libertarianz					9	0.03	—
99 MP					8	0.02	—
Democrats					7	0.02	—
Family Rights					5	0.02	—
One NZ					5	0.02	−0.14
RONZ					3	0.01	
Informal votes		346			117		
Total valid votes		31,495			32,046		
Turnout		32,163					
Labour hold	Majority	6,734	21.38	−0.70			

=== 2002 election ===
2002 general election: Mana
Notes:	Blue background denotes the winner of the electorate vote. Pink background denotes a candidate elected from their party list. Yellow background denotes an electorate win by a list member, or other incumbent. A ✓ or ✗ denotes status of any incumbent, win or lose respectively.						
Party	Candidate	Votes	%	±%	Party votes	%	±%
Labour	Winnie Laban	14,576	50.47	+3.52	13,997	47.52	+3.10
National	Sue Wood	8,200	28.39	−0.30	5,088	17.27	−11.43
Green	Olivia Mitchell	2,086	7.22	+3.92	2,184	7.41	+2.80
United Future	Graham Butterworth	1,663	5.76	+4.97 (Note: Percentage change calculated as a candidate for the United NZ Party in the 1999 election)	2,623	8.91	6.10
ACT	Simon Anthony Ewing-Jarvie	801	2.77	0.82	1,821	6.18	+0.85
Christian Heritage	Renton Maclachlan	520	1.80	−0.03	359	1.22	−0.64
Alliance	Michael Gilchrist	410	1.42	−3.88	507	1.72	−6.08
Progressive	Doreen Henderson	399	1.38	—	562	1.91	—
One NZ	Janet White	152	0.53	—	47	0.16	+0.12
Anti-Capitalist Alliance	Paul Hopkinson	74	0.26	—			
NZ First					1,857	6.30	+4.00
ORNZ					212	0.72	—
Legalise Cannabis					182	0.62	−0.67
Mana Māori					14	0.05	+0.01
NMP					1	0.003	−0.03
Informal votes		455			109		
Total valid votes		28,881			29,454		
Turnout		29,563					
Labour hold	Majority	6,376	22.08	+3.82			

=== 1999 election ===
1999 general election: Mana
Notes:	Blue background denotes the winner of the electorate vote. Pink background denotes a candidate elected from their party list. Yellow background denotes an electorate win by a list member, or other incumbent. A ✓ or ✗ denotes status of any incumbent, win or lose respectively.						
Party	Candidate	Votes	%	±%	Party votes	%	±%
Labour	✓ Graham Kelly	14,078	46.95	+5.63	13,394	44.42	+7.66
National	Mark Thomas	8,603	28.69		8,653	28.70	−2.73
Alliance	Moira Ann Lawler	1,590	5.30		2,351	7.80	−3.11
Mauri Pacific	Api Malu	1,011	3.37		75	0.25	
Green	Robert Shaw	989	3.30		1,390	4.61	
Independent	Bill Bevan	639	2.13				
ACT	Darryl Ward	583	1.94		1,606	5.33	+0.73
Christian Democrats	Lance Huxford	566	1.89		549	1.82	
Christian Heritage	Renton Maclachlan	549	1.83	−1.44 (Note: Percentage change calculated as a candidate for the Christian Coalition Party in the 1996 election)	559	1.85	
Legalise Cannabis	David Moore	479	1.60		388	1.29	−0.22
NZ First	Nigel Jones	354	1.18		694	2.30	−6.32
United NZ	Graham Butterworth	237	0.79		309	1.02	0.00
Independent	Lance Anderson	171	0.57				
McGillicuddy Serious	John Creser	113	0.38		58	0.19	−0.12
NMP	David Pattinson	12	0.04		9	0.03	
Asia Pacific	Lutena Mulitalo Mano'o	10	0.03				
Libertarianz					41	0.14	+0.11
Animals First					35	0.12	−0.06
Mana Māori					13	0.04	−0.04
One NZ					13	0.04	
The People's Choice					6	0.02	
Natural Law					5	0.02	
South Island					3	0.01	
Freedom Movement					1	0.00	
Republican					0	0.00	
Informal votes		396			228		
Total valid votes		29,984			30,152		
Labour hold	Majority	5,475	18.26	+5.14			

=== 1996 election ===
1996 general election: Mana
Notes:	Blue background denotes the winner of the electorate vote. Pink background denotes a candidate elected from their party list. Yellow background denotes an electorate win by a list member, or other incumbent. A ✓ or ✗ denotes status of any incumbent, win or lose respectively.						
Party	Candidate	Votes	%	±%	Party votes	%	±%
Labour	Graham Kelly	11,408	41.32		10,211	36.76	
National	Allan Wells	7,786	28.20		8,728	31.43	
NZ First	Graham Harding	3,128	11.33		2,393	8.62	
Alliance	Vernon Tile	2,472	8.95		3,031	10.91	
Christian Coalition	Renton Maclauchlan	902	3.27		1,098	3.95	
ACT	Neil Wilson	697	2.52		1,277	4.60	
Independent	Marie Iupeli	586	2.12				
Progressive Green	David Green	297	1.08		60	0.22	
McGillicuddy Serious	Grant Prankered	277	1.00		85	0.31	
Natural Law	Wayne Shepherd	53	0.19		25	0.09	
Legalise Cannabis					419	1.51	
United NZ					282	1.02	
Animals First					49	0.18	
Asia Pacific United					35	0.13	
Mana Māori					21	0.08	
Superannuitants & Youth					18	0.06	
Green Society					10	0.04	
Conservatives					9	0.03	
Libertarianz					8	0.03	
Advance New Zealand					6	0.02	
Ethnic Minority Party					5	0.02	
Te Tawharau					4	0.01	
Informal votes		303			135		
Total valid votes		27,606			27,774		
Labour win new seat	Majority	3,622	13.12				
