= Hekia Parata =

New Zealand politician

The Honourable Hekia Parata
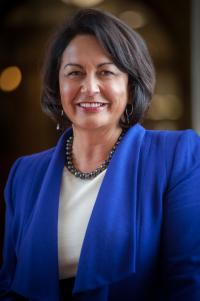

45th Minister of Education
- In office 12 December 2011 – 2 May 2017
- Prime Minister: John Key; Bill English
- Preceded by: Anne Tolley
- Succeeded by: Nikki Kaye

Minister of Ethnic Affairs
- In office 8 December 2010 – 13 December 2011
- Prime Minister: John Key
- Preceded by: Pansy Wong
- Succeeded by: Judith Collins

Member of the New Zealand Parliament for National Party List
- In office 2008–2017

Personal details
- Born: 1 November 1958 (age 68) Ruatoria, New Zealand
- Party: National Party
- Spouse: Wira Gardiner (died 2022)
- Children: 2
- Relatives: Selwyn Parata (brother); Arnold Reedy (grandfather); Tame Parata (great-great-grandfather)
- Education: University of Waikato
- Occupation: Public servant, politician

Patricia Hekia Parata (born 1 November 1958) is a former New Zealand public servant, diplomat, and politician.

After a career as a senior public servant, Parata was a member of the New Zealand House of Representatives, representing the National Party, from 2008 until 2017. She served as the Minister of Education in the Fifth National Government.

== Early life, family and education ==
Born and raised in Ruatoria, Parata shares Scottish, Irish, English, Ngāi Tahu and Ngāti Porou ancestry. She was one of ten children to her mother, Hīria Te Kiekie Reedy of Ngāti Porou. Her maternal grandfather was Arnold Reedy. Her father, Ron Parata, was of Ngāi Tahu descent and was raised in Puketeraki, near Dunedin. He served in the Māori Battalion and was a teacher and then principal at Ngata Memorial College in Ruatoria. Tame Parata, a Member of Parliament from 1885 to 1911, was Hekia Parata's great-great-grandfather.

One of Parata's sisters, Nori Parata, was the principal at Tolaga Bay Area School. Another sister, Apryll Parata, was a deputy chief executive at the Ministry of Education (although Apryll was first employed in this role prior to Hekia Parata's appointment as Minister of Education). Her brother is Sir Selwyn Parata.

Parata attended the University of Waikato, where she graduated with a Bachelor of Arts and Master of Arts in Māori studies. Her thesis, entitled, "Te kiri ka tokia e te anu: ko etahi ahuatanga ki nga kainga o Hiruharama me Te Horo," explored the role of women and the wharemate (house of mourning) on marae and was written in te reo Māori. Bilingual in Māori and English, Parata moved between the English- and Māori-speaking communities of students and was known as "Hekia" by Māori students and "Trish" by English speakers. She was elected president of the Waikato University Students' Association in 1980, the first Māori woman to hold the role. She received a distinguished alumni award from the university in 2011.

During the Springbok rugby tour of 1981 Parata took an active part in protests against the tour, including the protest at Rugby Park in Hamilton, which ended in a pitch invasion that stopped the match. She has stated that was unable to join the pitch invasion due to a plaster cast from the hip following surgery for a netball injury. Parata was a youth representative at the first Hui Taumata held in 1984.

In 2011, while a Member of Parliament, Parata was a senior executive fellow at the Kennedy School of Government at Harvard University.

== Public service career ==
Parata started working in the state sector in 1983, first with the Ministry of Foreign Affairs working on the Latin American and Caribbean desk. Her diplomatic service included a posting in New York. In 2017, she wrote about her feeling that New Zealand's foreign policy at the time exclusively talked about Pākehā New Zealand and did not embrace an "unequivocal New Zealand identity." She resigned from Foreign Affairs in 1987 and moved to the Ministry for the Environment, from which she was immediately seconded to work in Attorney-General Geoffrey Palmer's office on Treaty settlements and, thereafter, Prime Minister David Lange's policy advisory group. Her contributions included developing the principles of the Treaty of Waitangi as a public policy tool, Tomorrow's Schools and restructuring the former Department of Maori Affairs into two agencies: the Ministry of Māori Affairs and the Iwi Transition Agency.

Parata next worked at the New Zealand Housing Corporation before her final public service role, as deputy chief executive of Te Puni Kōkiri, the new Ministry for Māori Development. This was where she first met Wira Gardiner, her future husband, who was then the chief executive. They both left Te Puni Kōkiri to work as consultants and raise their two daughters, living in Ruatoria.

In 1997, Parata was appointed by Prime Minister Jim Bolger as a member of the Towards 2000 Taskforce, to "advise the Government on the appropriate "vision", events for the [millennium] celebrations and national projects of lasting public benefit". She also served on the boards of NZ On Air (a broadcasting funding authority) and the Ngai Tahu Development Corporation. In 2001, Parata was appointed to the Māori Television Service Board. She resigned within two months, reportedly blaming a "lack of funding" for the new Māori TV channel.

=== Controversies ===
Parata's name was connected to an investigation by the State Services Commissioner Don Hunn into the improper use of public funds in the purchase of two vehicles for her partner (and at that time Te Puni Kōkiri chief executive) Wira Gardiner in 1995. Parata's name was on the purchase orders issued by the Ministry, although it eventually became known that the cars were paid by and for Mr Gardiner at the time of purchase. The investigation cleared both Gardiner and Parata of any illegal activity, and the cars were returned to the Ministry for re-sale at a Government auction.

Parata's consultancy firm was contracted to recommend the best options for providing "ongoing high quality Māori advice" to Chief Executive Christine Rankin and senior managers at the Department of Work and Income in 1999, at a cost of $207,500. The expenditure was criticised by Green MP Rod Donald, as the Māori unemployment rate rose during this period from 27 to 29%. The firm also attracted controversy when National MP Murray McCully criticised the spending of $240,000 by the Ministry of Economic Development for training courses on the Treaty of Waitangi run by the company in 2003.

== Early political career ==
=== 2002 general election ===
Parata joined the National Party in August 2001 and was selected as the National Party candidate for the Wellington Central electorate that December for the 2002 general election. This was the first time National had run a candidate in the electorate since 1996. The campaign was managed by Parata's husband, Wira Gardiner, whose first wife Pauline had been the MP for a previous central Wellington electorate. Wira Gardiner had also been National's Māori vice president. Receiving 10,725 votes, she came second to incumbent Labour MP Marian Hobbs by 4,181 votes. Although Parata had been ranked highly on the party list, at 15, the National Party's 20.93% result meant that she did not enter Parliament as a list MP, although she was first in line if one had retired during the term.

Parata wrote a chapter describing her experience as the candidate in New Zealand Votes: the General Election of 2002, a review of the election. In it, she described her disappointment with the superficiality of candidates' debates and with the abuse she received from members of the public.

=== Don Brash leadership of the National Party ===
In a speech given by the National Party leader Don Brash to the Orewa Rotary Club on 27 January 2004, he spoke on the perceived "Māori racial separatism" in New Zealand. The speech, while being suggested as the main reason for a major surge in public support for the National Party (after their 2002 election provided the party's worst ever result), was displeasing to Parata and other Māori members of the National Party. Parata was reported as saying "this is taking the party back to the past. The views expressed [in the speech] marginalise New Zealand into a small island of rednecks". In an opinion published by The Dominion Post on 29 January 2004, Parata wrote, "I am ashamed to have stood for a party that has departed so far from its founding principles," arguing that Brash confuses Māori ethnicity with Māori culture and that Māori rights are based on iwi rights, not on race. She also argued for the protection of indigenous Māori culture. Despite these criticisms, Parata did not leave National, although she did not run again for National until 2008, after Brash had been replaced as leader by John Key.

Parata's husband Wira Gardiner described the situation for him and Parata during this period in a 2008 interview: "We seriously contemplated whether the National Party was ever going to be the party for us...but in the end we didn't abandon it, we just went to sleep for a while." Reflecting back on this period in 2010, Parata said: "I didn't consider them wilderness years; I had a particular disagreement with a particular person and his outlook at the time."

== Member of Parliament ==
New Zealand Parliament
Years	Term	Electorate	List	Party
2008–2011	49th	List	36	National
2011–2014	50th	List	18	National
2014–2017	51st	List	7	National

Having neither appeared as a candidate for an electorate, nor on the National Party list for the 2005 general election, Parata returned to politics, being selected as the National Party candidate in the Mana electorate for the 2008 election. Although losing to the incumbent Labour MP Luamanuvao Winnie Laban, she performed better than the National Party candidate in the 2005 election, Chris Finlayson, as well as an increased party vote percentage from three years previously. In spite of the electorate result, Parata was elected to Parliament as a list MP, having been ranked 36 on the National Party list.

In her maiden speech, Parata alluded to her great-great-grandfather Tame Parata, who was an MP in the Southern Māori electorate for the Liberal Party from 1885 to 1911, in addition to her tupuna (ancestor) Āpirana Ngata:

"I enter Parliament and begin this phase of my public service journey proud to follow in the footsteps of these ancestors in the pursuit of quality citizenship for all. They provide a model that I am glad to emulate: unambiguously Ngati Porou and Ngai Tahu; unequivocally a New Zealander...As I stand before you today, I am at once conscious of the weight of history and expectation that press upon me, and the lightness of possibilities that beckon. I am familiar with this dichotomy – I have grown up in a culture that walks through the present, with the constant companions of the past and the future."

In her first term, Parata was a member of the Māori affairs committee, the Emissions Trading Scheme review committee, and the electoral legislation committee. She was also deputy chair of the social services committee.

On 10 August 2010, Labour MP Luamanuvao Winnie Laban announced that she would resign from Parliament to take up a position as an assistant vice-chancellor at Victoria University of Wellington, leading to a by-election in the Mana electorate. Parata was the sole candidate for the National Party, winning the nomination without contest. In the by-election on 20 November 2011, she received 41% of all votes cast, an increase of 6% from her performance in the 2008 general election. Although she lost to Kris Faafoi by 1406 votes, the result was seen as a strong performance from Parata.

After the by-election, on 6 December 2010, Prime Minister John Key announced Parata would take over the Cabinet positions formerly held by Pansy Wong, who had resigned after a scandal emerged involving the use of taxpayer funded travel the month before. Parata was appointed Minister for Women's Affairs and Ethnic Affairs, and associate minister for energy and resources, ACC, and the community and voluntary sector. In February 2011, Parata became the acting Minister of Energy and Resources, relieving Gerry Brownlee to concentrate on his role as Minister for Canterbury Earthquake Recovery after the 2011 Christchurch earthquake.

Parata recontested the Mana electorate in 2011 and 2014, losing to Faafoi both times. However, she was re-elected on the National Party list. She was Minister of Education for five-and-a-half years in the second and third terms of the Fifth National Government. She was also Minister for Pacific Island Affairs from 2011 to 2014. Parata announced she would retire in October 2016 and continued in the Cabinet until 2 May 2017, leaving Parliament at the September 2017 general election. In her final months as a parliamentarian, she was a member of the foreign affairs, defence and trade committee and the social services committee.

== Minister of Education ==
Parata was appointed as Minister of Education following the 2011 general election, succeeding Anne Tolley. This was the role, she later said, which was the reason she ran for Parliament. She was expected to implement the National Government's plans to improve the quality of teaching and shake up the sector, but got into difficulty almost immediately. She introduced proposals to increase class sizes, leading to claims that it would cause some intermediate schools to lose up to nine teachers. As a result of intense public backlash over the issue, the plan was abandoned soon after it was introduced. Parata also had to negotiate the introduction of charter schools as part of National's confidence-and-supply agreements with John Banks and David Seymour, which was opposed by much of the existing education sector.

In September 2012, she announced that she planned to close or merge 31 schools in Christchurch and the surrounding Waimakariri and Selwyn districts. Twenty-two of the schools said the information on which the Ministry based its decision to justify the proposed closures was incorrect. In February 2013, Parata confirmed the Government would close seven Christchurch schools due to falling roll numbers and earthquake damage, in addition to two that had already closed voluntarily. Twelve schools would also be merged into six.

Each of these proposals was met with staunch opposition from affected parties and led to media speculation about Parata's performance and abilities. The New Zealand Educational Institute (NZEI) which represents primary school teachers, said she was "living in a fantasy world".

Parata also oversaw the introduction of the controversial Novopay payroll system which cost $30 million and was supposed to streamline payments to teachers and school staff. It had the opposite effect – with thousands of teachers receiving either too much, too little or not being paid at all. It was later revealed that the Ministry had spent $650,000 trialling the system. It was rolled out nationally even though more than half of the 731 trial-users felt they were not ready for the system to go live. Along the way, Parata fell out with newly recruited education secretary Lesley Longstone, who was forced to resign over the debacle. There were calls for Parata to follow suit. In 2013, Fairfax Media revealed 'internal office tensions' among her staff; several private secretaries and a senior adviser left her office in the Beehive. Her senior private secretary resigned just before Christmas and the advisor was only two months into a two-year secondment. At least one Beehive staff member issued a personal grievance claim.

New Zealand Herald commentator Audrey Young wrote, "Parata came in with high expectations about how to lift student achievement, but an unrealistic view of what the Ministry of Education was capable of doing". She believed Parata was ill-prepared for the role as Education Minister, pointing out that she had never spent even one day in opposition – let alone as opposition spokesperson for education. She was also criticised for a reliance on jargon and obfuscation.

After surviving a Cabinet reshuffle in January 2013 that saw two of her ministerial colleagues dumped, Parata said she had made "one or two mistakes". However, Prime Minister John Key removed responsibility for managing the Novopay system from Parata, giving that job to Steven Joyce. Political commentator Bryce Edwards suggested she only kept her job because she was a "relatively attractive... Māori woman". A One News Colmar Brunton poll in February 2013 saw 59% of those surveyed believed the Prime Minister made the wrong decision by keeping Parata on. However, she was retained as Minister of Education after the 2014 election.

In October 2016, Parata announced that she would not seek reelection at the 2017 election and would retire from politics. Political obituaries described her as having "risen from the ashes" of her earlier tenure as education minister, lauding her for the improvement in the rate of Māori and Pasifika students obtaining NCEA level 2. Commentators also praised her work to encourage schools to work more collaboratively with one another through the establishment of "communities of learning" and her introduction of legislation modernising students' access to online education. She also began the work to replace the socioeconomic decile school funding system with an equity index involving predictive risk modelling, which was completed under the Sixth Labour Government.

Parata resigned as Minister of Education on 2 May 2017 ahead of her retirement and was succeeded by Nikki Kaye.

== Later career ==
After leaving Parliament, Parata returned to the East Coast. She was appointed by the subsequent Labour Government to two inquiries. On 5 December 2022, she was appointed to the Royal Commission of Inquiry into the COVID-19 response. In February 2023, she was appointed to lead a ministerial inquiry into forestry land use, following Cyclone Gabrielle. The forestry inquiry was submitted to ministers in May 2023. Parata resigned from the COVID-19 inquiry in November 2023.

== Personal life ==
Parata was married to former professional soldier, senior public servant and author Wira Gardiner. Since Wira received his knighthood in 2008, Parata has been able to use the official style Lady Gardiner, however she rarely does so. Parata and Gardiner met while they worked together at the Ministry of Māori Development, Te Puni Kōkiri. They have two children together and three stepchildren from Gardiner's previous marriage to former MP Pauline Gardiner.

Political offices
Preceded by Pansy Wong	Minister of Ethnic Affairs; 2010–2011	Succeeded by Judith Collins
Preceded by Pansy Wong	Minister of Women's Affairs; 2010–2011	Succeeded by Jo Goodhew
Preceded by Anne Tolley	Minister of Education; 2011–2017	Succeeded by Nikki Kaye
