= Paul Quinn (New Zealand politician) =

Former New Zealand rugby union player and politician

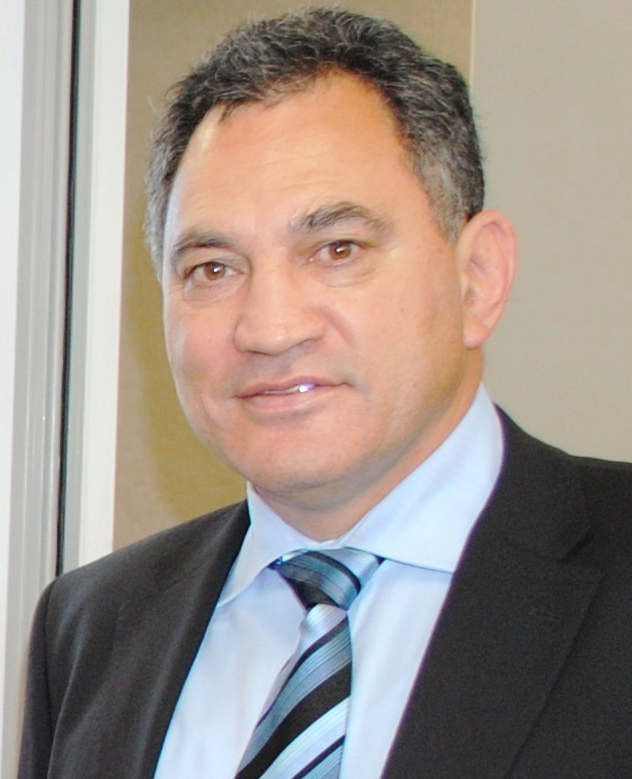
- Quinn in 2010
- Born: Bernard Paul Quinn; 5 May 1951 (age 75)
- School: St Joseph's College
- University: Lincoln College
- Occupation: Businessman

Rugby union career
- Position: Loose forward
Amateur team(s)
Years	Team	Apps	(Points)
- Marist St Pats, Wellington
Provincial / State sides
Years	Team	Apps	(Points)
1976–1983	Wellington		
International career
Years	Team	Apps	(Points)
1977–1982	New Zealand Māori		
Coaching career
- Years: Team
- 1987: Texas Rugby Union

Member of Parliament for National Party List
- In office 8 November 2008 – 26 November 2011

Bernard Paul Quinn (born 5 May 1951) is a New Zealand businessman, former rugby union player and former politician. He captained the Wellington Rugby Football Union team from 1981 to 1983 and the New Zealand Māori national team from 1980 to 1982. From 2008 to 2011, he was a Member of the New Zealand House of Representatives for the National Party.

== Early life and family ==
Quinn was born on 5 May 1951 and grew up on his family's farm in Hawke's Bay. He has three brothers and four sisters. Of Māori descent, Quinn affiliates to Ngāti Awa and Ngāi Tūhoe. He was educated at St Joseph's College in Masterton and Lincoln College, graduating with a Bachelor of Agricultural Commerce in 1973.

He is married to Viv Beck, a communications executive and businesswoman who unsuccessfully contested the 2022 Auckland mayoral election.

== Career ==
Quinn's early career was as a public servant. His first position was as an analyst at the Reserve Bank of New Zealand. Later he worked as a manager in the Department of Maori Affairs (now Te Puni Kōkiri) between 1979 and 1984. During this time he played rugby union for Wellington and the New Zealand Māori national side. After retiring from playing rugby, Quinn was secretary of the New Zealand Forestry Council from 1984 to 1986.

Returning to New Zealand after a year coaching rugby in the United States, Quinn set up his own consultancy firm and was a director of the Institute of Geological and Nuclear Sciences from 1992 to 1998. He was the general manager for forestry at freight movement company Tranz Link from 1993 to 1999 and held a number of directorship positions in rugby union in the 1990s and 2000s. He was involved in the Ngāti Awa Treaty of Waitangi claim settlement.

After his parliamentary career, Quinn became a director of Ngāti Awa and chaired the iwi's White Island Tours subsidiary, which ran tours to Whakaari / White Island, up to and including during its eruption in 2019. In 2023, the company pleaded guilty to charges of failing to ensure the health and safety of workers and failing to ensure the health and safety of other persons during the eruption.

== Rugby union ==
Quinn played rugby union for the Wellington Rugby Football Union from 1976 to 1983 (captain 1981–1983) and for New Zealand Māori between 1977 and 1982 (captain 1980–1982). His principal playing position was a flanker. Murray Mexted succeeded him as Wellington captain. Quinn's captaincy was criticised during the New Zealand Māori tour of Wales and Spain in 1982 by former British Lions coach Carwyn James, who said that while Quinn was "useful" as a flanker but was "inches too short and a couple of yards too slow" compared to previous back row players who had captained All Black sides.

Quinn spent time in the United States as head coach for the Texas Rugby Union in 1987. He was a director of Wellington Rugby Football Union from 1997 to 2005 and a director of the New Zealand Rugby Union and chair of the New Zealand Maori Rugby Board from 2002 to 2009.

== Member of Parliament ==
New Zealand Parliament
Years	Term	Electorate	List	Party
2008–2011	49th	List	48	National

Quinn stood for the New Zealand National Party in the Hutt South electorate at the 2008 general election and was also ranked 48 on the party's list. Quinn finished second in Hutt South to Trevor Mallard but was elected from the party list. In his maiden speech, delivered on 16 December 2008, Quinn said he had no ambition to be a member of Parliament but was inspired to run because he disagreed with the policy direction of the Fifth Labour Government, which he described as "nanny state." He also criticised the public service, which he described as having lost its neutrality and affirmed his support for the National Party to be in government with the Māori Party.

Quinn was appointed a member of the Māori affairs committee and the justice and electoral committee on 9 December 2008. During his term, he worked on electoral legislation, joining the electoral legislation committee from 31 March 2010. This was a specialist committee set up to consider the replacement of the Electoral Finance Act 2007 and legislation related to the 2011 New Zealand voting system referendum. In 2010, Quinn's Electoral (Disqualification of Convicted Prisoners) Amendment Bill was drawn from the member's ballot. The bill proposed the removal of voting rights for prisoners, and was declared to be unjustifiably inconsistent with the New Zealand Bill of Rights Act. In a legal opinion, Attorney-General Chris Finlayson held that "the objective of the Bill [was] not rationally linked to the blanket ban on prisoner voting" because it did not specifically target serious offenders. Despite these criticisms, the bill was passed into law in December 2010. Voting rights for short-term prisoners were eventually restored in 2020.

At the 2011 general election, Quinn again finished second in Hutt South and his party list ranking of 55 was too low to be re-elected. After leaving Parliament, he was involved in a disagreement with a Wellington bank customer who accused Quinn of punching him. No charges were laid. By mid-2013 Quinn was the highest-ranked National Party list candidate who had not been elected. He had the opportunity to return to Parliament when Jackie Blue resigned, but declined the opportunity as he had "moved on" with his life and relocated to Auckland. Instead diplomat Paul Foster-Bell took the role.
