= 2010 Mana by-election =

New Zealand by-election

- 20 November 2010
- Turnout: 23,314 (54.72%)
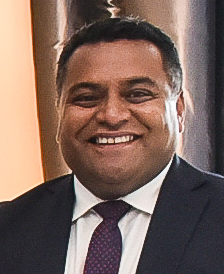

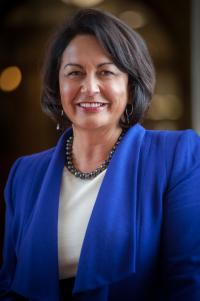

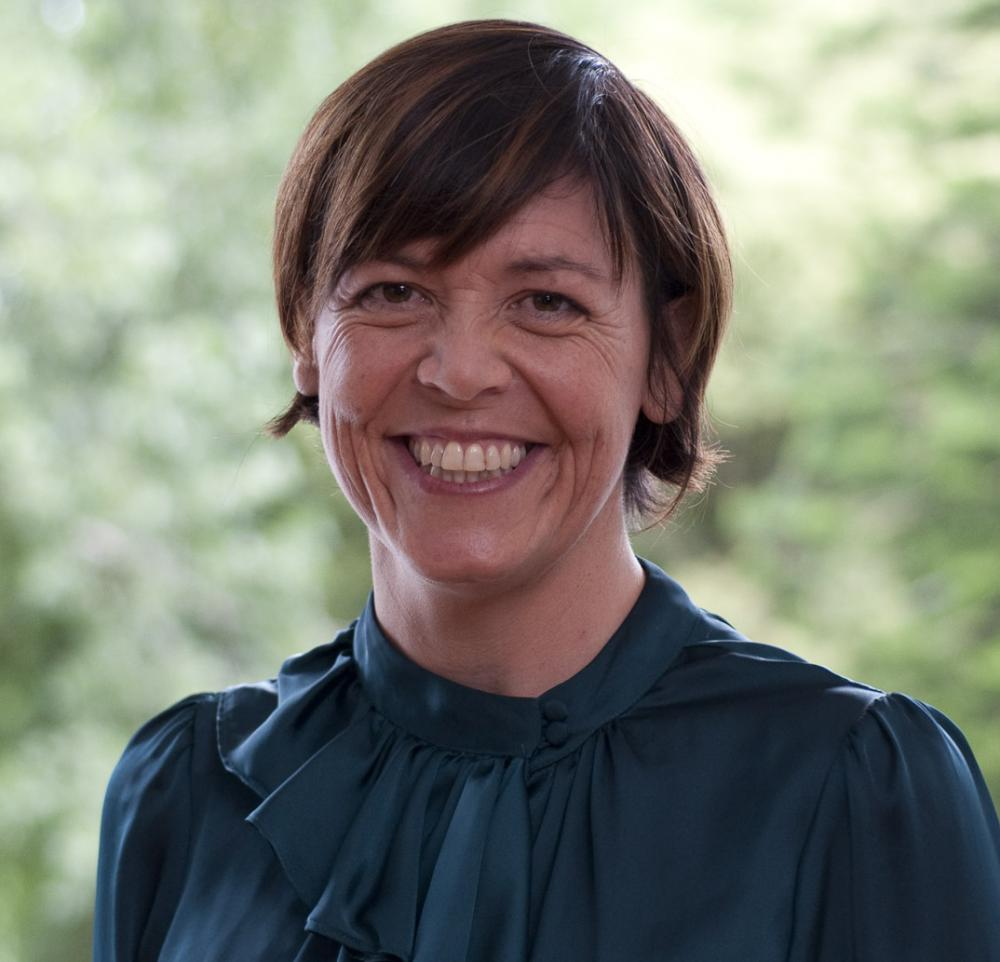
Candidate	Kris Faafoi	Hekia Parata	Jan Logie
Party	Labour	National	Green
Popular vote	10,980	9,574	1,543
Percentage	47.17%	41.13%	6.62%
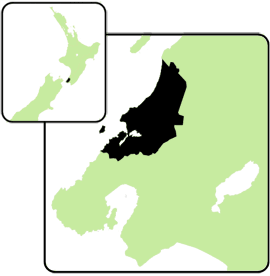
MP before election
Luamanuvao Winnie Laban
Labour
Elected MP
Kris Faafoi
Labour

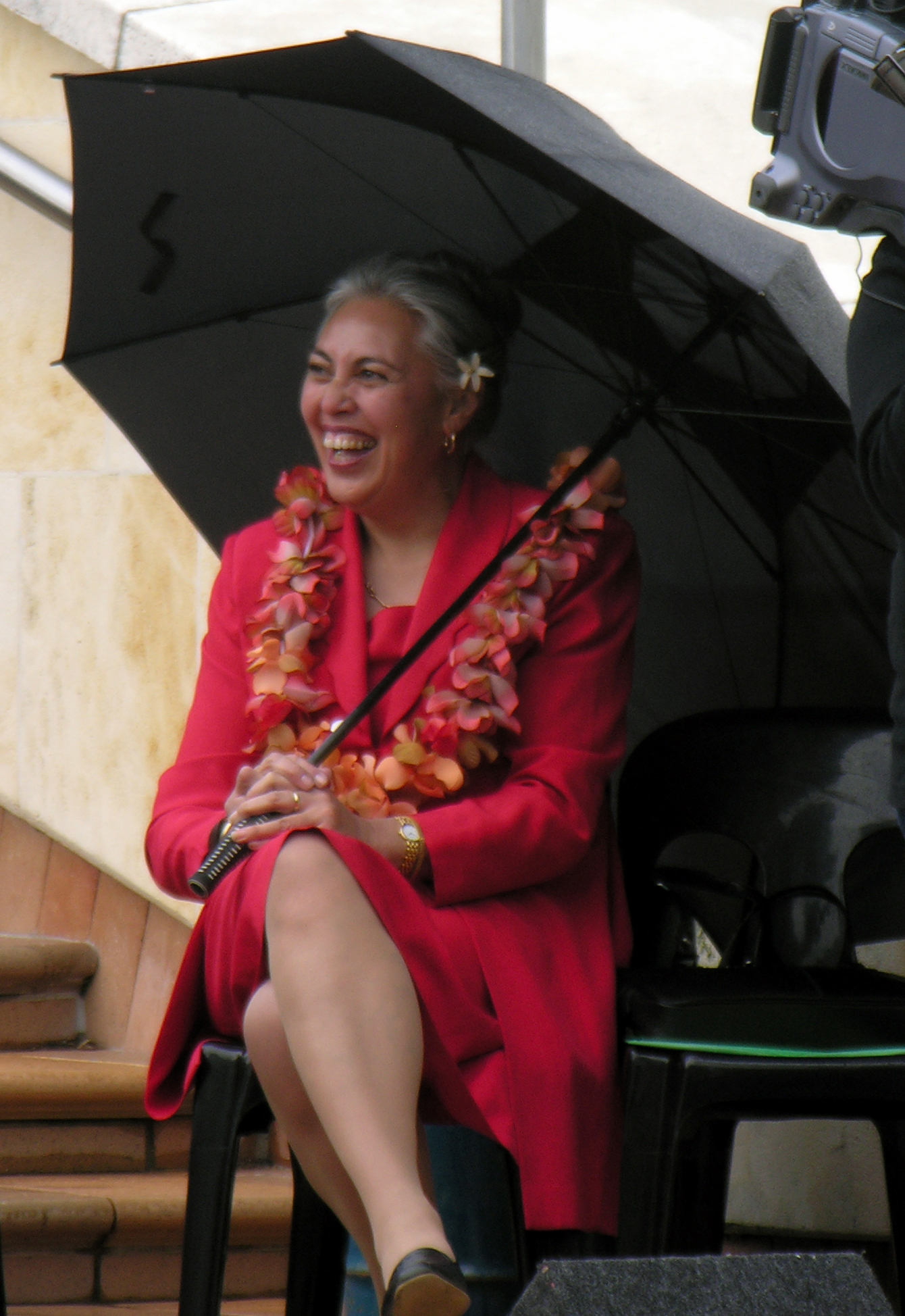
Luamanuvao Winnie Laban, whose resignation from Parliament triggered the by-election

A by-election was held in the New Zealand electorate of Mana on 20 November 2010. The seat was vacated by former Labour Pacific Island Affairs Minister Luamanuvao Winnie Laban, who announced her resignation from the New Zealand Parliament on 10 August 2010 following her appointment as Assistant Vice Chancellor Pasifika at Victoria University. According to provisional results, the by-election was won by Kris Faafoi, also of the Labour Party.

== Demographics and election history ==
The Mana electorate has large Pasifika and Māori populations, with 21% and 18% for each ethnicity, respectively. It includes the suburbs of Cannons Creek and Porirua East, which are some of the poorest in New Zealand. The median personal income for residents of Mana is $NZ26,000.

The New Zealand Labour Party has held the electorate since its creation for the 1999 general election. Chris Finlayson and Hekia Parata, who contested Mana for the New Zealand National Party in 2005 and 2008, are current list MPs.

== Candidates ==
Eight candidates contested the by-election:

Party	Name	Notes
Alliance	Kelly Buchanan	Attempted unsuccessfully to have her name removed from the ballot papers following Matt McCarten's announcement of his candidacy.
Legalise Cannabis	Julian Crawford	
ACT	Colin Du Plessis	
Labour Party	Kris Faafoi	Former press secretary to the Parliamentary Leader of the Labour Party
Libertarianz	Sean Fitzpatrick	Deputy leader of party
Green Party	Jan Logie	Former YWCA Director
Independent	Matt McCarten	Former president of Alliance and current Unite Union general secretary
National Party	Hekia Parata	Current List MP/ deputy chair of social services Select Committee

=== Kris Faafoi (Labour) ===
Labour leader Phil Goff said that "Labour will be looking to find a strong candidate and will campaign on both local issues and issues that matter to all Kiwis".

President of the Labour Party, Andrew Little indicated he would not put himself forward for his party's nomination, preferring a Pasifika or Māori candidate. Porirua Deputy Mayor, Litea Ah Hoi, chief press secretary to Phil Goff and former Television New Zealand reporter, Kris Faafoi, Porirua City Councillor, Taima Fagaloa, and former Progressive Party candidate for Ōtaki, Josie Pagani, were possible Labour Party contestants for the by-election. Kris Faafoi was chosen on 18 September.

=== Matt McCarten (Independent) ===
On 27 October Matt McCarten announced that he would stand as an independent candidate for Parliament in the Mana by-election The trade-union leader has received considerable media attention for his surprise nomination. Political analysts quote him as being able to "strike a chord in Mana" in the by-election given his political and popular appeal with the high number of poor and unemployed in the electorate.

McCarten suggested that "voters are more likely to take a risk on an outside chance in by-elections than general elections".

=== Hekia Parata (National) ===
The National Party confirmed that they would contest the by-election and selected Hekia Parata, the National candidate for Mana in 2008, as the party's candidate.

=== Other parties ===
United Future opted not to contest the by-election, citing strain on the party's resources. The Alliance Party attempted to withdraw their candidate Kelly Buchanan, after the announcement of candidacy by Matt McCarten, an ex-party leader and founding president. They were unsuccessful and announced instead that electors should not vote for Ms Buchanan and instead vote for McCarten.

== Results ==
2010 Mana by-election
Notes: Blue background denotes the winner of the by-election. Pink background denotes a candidate elected from their party list prior to the by-election. Yellow background denotes the winner of the by-election, who was a list MP prior to the by-election. A ✓ or ✗ denotes status of any incumbent, win or lose respectively.
Party	Candidate	Votes	%	±%
Labour	Kris Faafoi	10,980	47.17	-5.89
National	Hekia Parata	9,574	41.13	+6.14
Green	Jan Logie	1,543	6.62	−0.09
Independent	Matt McCarten	849	3.65	−
ACT	Colin du Plessis	136	0.58	−1.26
Legalise Cannabis	Julian Crawford	112	0.48	−
Libertarianz	Sean Fitzpatrick	46	0.20	+0.01
Alliance	Kelly Buchanan	37	0.16	−
Informal votes		37		
Total Valid votes		23,277		
Labour hold	Majority	1,406	6.04	-12.03

== Reaction ==
This by-election was considered a good result by the National Party as Labour's majority had been cut down to 1080 from just over 6,000 at the last election.

Kris Faafoi was "happy with the result; we won ... at the beginning we always said it was going to be a tough race."

John Key said "I never thought coming second in politics would feel so good....Sometimes losing is winning and this is one of them where we have had a tremendous result here. In all probability, the swing should have gone against National because that's what happens when you are the Government campaigning in a very safe Labour seat and he has been thrashed. When this campaign began, Phil Goff said this by-election would be referendum on the Government's policies. Well he was right!"

Phil Goff said that the result reflects well on Faafoi's hard work and is "one step on the way to getting back to a Labour government".

Many other Labour MPs did not think that they had lost the by election. William Sio said that "The truth is that it is always difficult for most low income families to get involved in a by-election like this and to think about improving the future when they are more concerned about the everyday reality of with putting food on the table and worrying about their kids doing well at school."

Audrey Young, a New Zealand Herald writer, criticised what she called Labour's "spin tactics" "Some in Labour who should know better are creatively suggesting that Labour actually did better in the by-election than the last general election, despite having its majority slashed from 6155 to 1080. From three senior figures has come the suggestions that Kris Faafoi winning 47 per cent of the candidate vote on Saturday was a better result than the 43.9 per cent party vote that the party got in 2008, when Winnie Laban stood. That is like comparing raisins and sheep droppings."

However, Grant Robertson, a Labour MP, praised Parata by saying "I also think Hekia deserves some credit. She is an articulate person who campaigned hard. Most importantly in terms of the result she has been campaigning/working in the electorate non-stop for about four years, compared to Kris' few months. That makes a difference. She had a profile and that worked to her advantage. She did not win, but no doubt she feels she put in a good result."
