= Katrina Shanks =

New Zealand politician

Member of the New Zealand Parliament for National Party List
- In office 7 February 2007 – 21 January 2014
- Preceded by: Don Brash (Note: Normally, list MPs do not have individual predecessors or successors, but Brash resigned during a sitting parliament and therefore was succeeded by Shanks, who later resigned herself and was succeeded by Hayes.)
- Succeeded by: Jo Hayes

Personal details
- Born: 12 May 1969 (age 57) Dannevirke
- Party: National Party
- Spouse: Bill Shanks
- Education: Massey University
- Profession: Member of Parliament
- Website: http://katrinashanks.co.nz

Katrina May Shanks (born 12 May 1969) is a New Zealand chief executive and former politician.

Shanks was a Member of Parliament for the National Party from 2007 to 2014. After leaving Parliament she returned to her business career and has been chief executive of the Australian and New Zealand Institute of Insurance and Finance (ANZIIF) since January 2024.

== Early years ==
Shanks was born in Dannevirke in 1969, and attended St Matthew's Collegiate for Girls in Masterton and Dannevirke High School. She graduated with a Bachelor of Business Studies from Massey University.

Shanks' father, Graeme Hislop, contested the Pahiatua electorate for Social Credit in 1975 and in the 1977 by-election.

Prior to entering politics, Shanks worked as a self-employed accountant. She had previously worked as a project accountant for Westpac, in retail client services for Newton Investment Management in the United Kingdom, and as a senior auditor for Audit New Zealand. Shanks has three children.

Shanks joined the New Zealand National Party in 2001 as a member of the Karori branch and was a member of the party's executive committee for the Wellington Central electorate until 2004, when she joined the Ohariu-Belmont branch.

== Member of Parliament ==
New Zealand Parliament
Years	Term	Electorate	List	Party
2007–2008	48th	List	46	National
2008–2011	49th	List	46	National
2011–2014	50th	List	38	National

Shanks was the National Party's candidate in Ohariu-Belmont at the 2005 general election. She did not defeat incumbent Peter Dunne but performed more strongly than National's 2002 candidate Dale Stevens. At 46th on the party list, Shanks was the highest-placed National list candidate not to be elected (indeed, the election night result projected that she would be elected but the final result saw National's result drop by one seat). She eventually joined Parliament in February 2007 when former leader Don Brash resigned.

Shanks became her party's associate spokeswoman for commerce and economic development and sat on the social services committee for the remainder of the term.

In the 2008 general election, Shanks contested the new Ōhariu electorate but did not intend to win. National ran a "party vote only" campaign in that seat to ensure ally Dunne's re-election. She was placed again at 46th on the party list and National's stronger party vote result meant that she returned to Parliament. National, with Dunne's support, formed a new minority government. Shanks was a member of the commerce committee as well as deputy chair (2008–2009) and later chair (2009–2011) of the social services committee.

Shanks was elected as a list MP for a final time in 2011. She announced her intention to retire from Parliament at the 2014 general election but instead retired early at the end of 2013. She was succeeded as a list MP by Jo Hayes.

== Post-parliamentary career ==
After leaving Parliament, Shanks became chief executive of the New Zealand Funeral Directors Association. She held this role until 2018 when she became the inaugural chief executive of Financial Advice New Zealand. In 2023 she left that organisation and relocated to Melbourne to become chief executive of the Australian and New Zealand Institute of Insurance and Finance (ANZIIF).
