= Kris Faafoi =

New Zealand politician (born 1976)

The Honourable Kris Faafoi
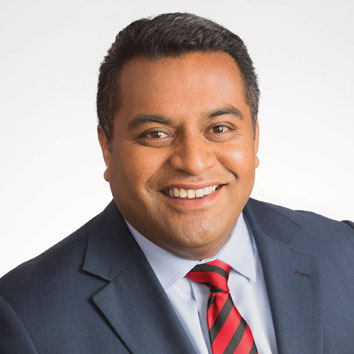
- Faafoi in 2020

50th Minister of Justice
- In office 6 November 2020 – 14 June 2022
- Prime Minister: Jacinda Ardern
- Preceded by: Andrew Little
- Succeeded by: Kiri Allan

26th Minister for Broadcasting and Media
- In office 7 September 2018 – 14 June 2022
- Prime Minister: Jacinda Ardern
- Preceded by: Clare Curran
- Succeeded by: Willie Jackson

57th Minister of Immigration
- In office 22 July 2020 – 14 June 2022
- Prime Minister: Jacinda Ardern
- Preceded by: Iain Lees-Galloway
- Succeeded by: Michael Wood

13th Minister of Commerce and Consumer Affairs
- In office 26 October 2017 – 6 November 2020
- Prime Minister: Jacinda Ardern
- Preceded by: Jacqui Dean
- Succeeded by: David Clark

Minister for Government Digital Services
- In office 27 June 2019 – 6 November 2020
- Prime Minister: Jacinda Ardern
- Preceded by: Megan Woods
- Succeeded by: David Clark (as Minister for the Digital Economy and Communications)

25th Minister of Civil Defence
- In office 26 October 2017 – 27 June 2019
- Prime Minister: Jacinda Ardern
- Preceded by: Nathan Guy
- Succeeded by: Peeni Henare

64th Minister of Customs
- In office 20 September 2018 – 27 June 2019
- Prime Minister: Jacinda Ardern
- Preceded by: Meka Whaitiri
- Succeeded by: Jenny Salesa

Member of the New Zealand Parliament for Labour party list
- In office 17 October 2020 – 23 July 2022
- Succeeded by: Dan Rosewarne (Note: Normally, list MPs do not have individual predecessors or successors, but Faafoi resigned during a sitting parliament and therefore was succeeded by Rosewarne.)

Member of the New Zealand Parliament for Mana
- In office 20 November 2010 – 17 October 2020
- Preceded by: Winnie Laban
- Succeeded by: Barbara Edmonds

Personal details
- Born: 23 June 1976 (age 50)
- Party: Labour
- Spouse: Mae Puller (married 16/08/24)
- Children: 3
- Profession: Journalist
- Website: beehive.govt.nz

Kristopher John Faafoi (born 23 June 1976) is a former New Zealand television journalist and Labour Party politician. He was the Member of Parliament for the Mana electorate from 2010 until 2020, when he became a list MP. Faafoi held a number of ministerial portfolios in the Sixth Labour Government from 2017, including Minister of Justice, Minister of Broadcasting and Media, and Minister of Immigration. He retired from politics in June 2022.

== Early life ==
Faafoi's parents originate from the Tokelau atoll of Fakaofo. He grew up in Christchurch. His father was sent to New Zealand to study at secondary school, and later became a primary-school teacher. His mother came to New Zealand as part of a repatriation scheme, and later worked in a factory. Faafoi has stated that he did not have a typical Tokelau upbringing and does not speak fluent Tokelauan. In 1994 he was a member of the New Zealand Youth Parliament, selected to represent Sydenham MP Jim Anderton.

== Professional career ==
Faafoi trained as a journalist and is a graduate of the New Zealand Broadcasting School at CPIT (now Ara Institute of Canterbury). He worked for TVNZ and the BBC as a reporter and as a political commentator. He joined Labour Party leader Phil Goff's office after the 2008 general election, as chief press secretary. He was also chair of the party's Rongotai Pacific branch.

== Political career ==
New Zealand Parliament
Years	Term	Electorate	List	Party
2010–2011	49th	Mana		Labour
2011–2014	50th	Mana	41	Labour
2014–2017	51st	Mana	none	Labour
2017–2020	52nd	Mana	20	Labour
2020–2022	53rd	List	15	Labour

=== Fifth National Government (2010–2017) ===
After the resignation of Mana MP Luamanuvao Winnie Laban on 10 August 2010, Faafoi was chosen to represent the Labour Party in the resulting by-election, which was set for 20 November. Four people contested the selection, with Faafoi defeating business manager Michael Evans, barrister Peter Foster and communications adviser Josie Pagani. During the campaign, he was criticised for a campaign brochure stating, "I had a great start because my family settled in Mana," implying that he grew up in the North Island electorate despite being raised in Christchurch in the South Island.

Faafoi won the by-election with 10,980 votes (46.4%), becoming the first MP of Tokelauan descent. Hekia Parata from the National Party was placed second and received 9,574 (41.6%), giving Faafoi a margin of 1,080 votes (4.82%). This was a significant decrease of Laban's majority of 6,155 (17.7%) at the 2008 general election. Faafoi more than doubled the margin in the 2011 election, and had a 7,953 votes margin in the 2014 election.

=== Sixth Labour Government (2017–2023) ===
==== First term, 2017–2020 ====
Kris Faafoi was elected as a Minister of Civil Defence, Commerce and Consumer Affairs and Associate Minister of Immigration, outside Cabinet by the Labour Party caucus following Labour's formation of a coalition government with New Zealand First and the Greens.

On 30 August 2017, Faafoi announced that the Government was investing NZ$5.2 million into supporting "rapid response teams" to support communities in emergencies. The boost in funding was the result of a critical Ministerial Technical Advisory Group's (TAG) review of the Government's unsatisfactory responses to the 2016 Kaikōura earthquake and the 2017 Port Hills fires.

When Minister of Customs Meka Whaitiri "stood aside" in August 2018 over a "staffing matter" pending an investigation that same day, Faafoi assumed the Customs portfolio.

On 7 September 2018 Faafoi was appointed Minister of Broadcasting, Communications and Digital Media upon the resignation of Clare Curran. In 2018 his main political priority was "dealing with loan sharks".

On 27 June 2019, Faafoi was appointed Minister of Government Digital Services, complementing his role as Minister of Broadcasting, Communications and Digital Media. He also assumed the position of Associate Minister for Public Housing. Faafoi relinquished his position as Minister of Civil Defence and Minister of Customs, which were assumed by Peeni Henare and Jenny Salesa respectively.

On 6 December 2019, Faafoi apologised to Prime Minister Jacinda Ardern for promising to speed up an immigration visa application for Opshop singer Jason Kerrison's father. Opposition National Party leader Simon Bridges claimed that Faafoi's actions could constitute a conflict of interest that breached Cabinet rules.

On 8 February 2020 he announced his intention to not seek re-election in Mana for the 2020 election; he will stand as a List MP instead. On 22 July, Faafoi became Minister of Immigration after Iain Lees-Galloway was dismissed following his admission of an inappropriate relationship with a former staffer in one of his agencies.

On 4 September, Faafoi, in his capacity as Immigration Minister, extended the visas of visitors due to expire before the end of October by five months. In addition, temporary migrants unable to leave New Zealand due to international travel restrictions caused by the COVID-19 pandemic will be granted a new two-month COVID-19 short-term visa.

==== Second term, 2020–2023 ====
During the 2020 general election, Faafoi was re-elected on the party list. In early November 2020, Faafoi was appointed as Minister of Justice, while retaining his "Broadcasting and Media" and Immigration portfolios.

On 21 December 2020, Faafoi, in his capacity as Immigration Minister, announced a six-month extension for employer-assisted work and working holiday visa holders along with their partners and children in order to address the country's labour shortage. In addition, a 12-month stand-down period for low-paid Essential Skills visa holders working in New Zealand for three years was suspended until January 2022.

In July 2021, Justice Minister Faafoi introduced the Conversion Practices Prohibition Legislation Bill, which seeks to ban conversion therapy. The Bill passed its third reading on 15 February 2022.

In mid–November 2021, Faafoi introduced legislation to repeal the Sentencing and Parole Reform Act 2010 (the so-called "Three Strikes Law"). He described the "three-strikes law" as "archaic, unfair, and ineffective" and claimed it had led to "absurd and perverse" outcomes. While the proposed repeal legislation was supported by the Labour and Green parties, the opposition National and ACT parties opposed repealing the "three strikes law."

On 13 June 2022, it was announced that Faafoi would resign his seat in Parliament soon in order to spend more time with his family, particularly his school-aged youngest son. Faafoi had wanted to resign during the 2020 general election but Ardern had convinced him to stay for another year. His resignation triggered a cabinet reshuffle within the Sixth Labour Government, in which Faafoi's immigration, justice and broadcasting portfolios were assumed by Michael Wood, Kiri Allan, and Willie Jackson, respectively. On 16 June, Faafoi was granted retention of the title "The Honourable" for life, in recognition of his term as a member of the Executive Council. Faafoi's resignation from Parliament took effect on 23 July.

== After politics ==
After leaving Parliament, Faafoi started a lobbying and public relations firm called Dialogue22, as chief executive. In January 2024 it was announced he would start in April as the chief executive of the Insurance Council of New Zealand.

== Personal life ==
Kris lives in Wellington with his wife Mae and three sons. Faafoi was previously married to Gina Faafoi-Rogers. Their first son was born 2008.

His elder brother Jason is a TV presenter and musician. They made a documentary together about their family visiting Tokelau, which was released in 2004.

== Notes ==
New Zealand Parliament
Preceded by Winnie Laban	Member of Parliament for Mana; 2010–2020	Succeeded by Barbara Edmonds
Political offices
Preceded by Nathan Guy	Minister of Civil Defence; 2017–2019	Succeeded by Peeni Henare
Preceded by Jacqui Dean	Minister of Commerce and Consumer Affairs; 2017–2020	Succeeded by David Clark
Preceded by Clare Curran	Minister of Broadcasting, Communications and Digital Media; 2018–2022	Succeeded by Willie Jackson
Preceded by Meka Whaitiri	Minister of Customs; 2018–2019	Succeeded by Jenny Salesa
Preceded by Iain Lees-Galloway	Minister of Immigration; 2020–2022	Succeeded by Michael Wood
Party political offices
Preceded by Chris Hipkins	Senior Whip of the Labour Party; 2016–2017	Succeeded by Ruth Dyson
