= ANZIIF =

Professional education association

Australian and New Zealand Institute of Insurance and Finance
- Abbreviation: ANZIIF
- Formation: 1884 (in Melbourne)
- Purpose: Education, professional development, insurance, finance and membership
- Professional title: Allied; Affiliate (Aff) CIP; Associate (Assoc) CIP; Senior Associate (Snr Assoc) CIP; Fellow (Fellow) CIP
- Headquarters: Melbourne, Australia
- Locations: Australia; New Zealand; Shanghai
- Members: 16,500
- President: Ben Bessell
- CEO: Katrina Shanks
- Publication: The Journal
- Website: anziif.com

The Australian and New Zealand Institute of Insurance and Finance (ANZIIF), also known as the Institute, is a professional association and education provider for the insurance and financial services industry in the Asia-Pacific region. ANZIIF was founded in 1884, making it one of the oldest professional associations in the region.

== History ==
The Victorian Insurance Institute was formed in July 1884 and was followed by the New South Wales Insurance Institute in August 1884. In 1911, the Western Australia Insurance Institute came into existence and the South Australia Insurance Institute did so in 1913. Across the Tasman Sea, the Insurance Institute of New Zealand (IINZ) formed in 1937 through the merger of the Insurance Officers Guild of New Zealand (formed in 1920) and the Faculty of Insurance (formed in 1933).

The federalist Institute model had been proposed originally in Australia in 1887, but it was not until 1919 that the state Institutes formed 'The Incorporated Australian Insurance Institute' (the word 'Incorporated' was dropped in 1960).

In October 2000, members of both the AII and IINZ voted to merge the two professional associations and the new name of the Australian and New Zealand Institute of Insurance and Finance was adopted. The Australian state-based Institutes, who continued to operate, followed suit in the next twelve months, becoming fully affiliated with the new body.

The year 2024 marks 140 years since the first Institute was established and in 2023 ANZIIF celebrated fourteen wins as the leading provider of insurance and financial services education, training and professional services membership in Australia, New Zealand and the Asia-Pacific.

In January 2024, Katrina Shanks was appointed CEO of ANZIIF.

=== Crest ===
The Institute's original coat of arms, granted in 1982

The ANZIIF coat of arms, crest and badge were granted in 1982 by the College of Arms.

== Membership ==
=== Membership levels ===
ANZIIF offers six membership levels with a focus on providing a pathway for Insurance professionals throughout their careers.

=== CIP program ===
The ANZIIF CIP (Certified Insurance Professional) program is recognised as the standard of professionalism for the insurance and financial services industry.

CIPs are insurance professionals who have obtained an ANZIIF qualification or recognised equivalent, maintain up-to-date technical skills and knowledge through a program of professional development and abide by the ANZIIF Code of Ethics.

=== Faculties ===
ANZIIF members are grouped into faculties which focus on specific areas of expertise. These groups get specialised content, forums to discuss and network, a tailored library of articles and are led by industry specific boards.

The faculties are:

- Faculty of Insurance Broking
- Faculty of Risk Management
- Faculty of Claims
- Faculty of General Insurance
- Faculty of Reinsurance
- Faculty of Life & Retirement Income

=== Member services ===
Members of ANZIIF have access to a range of member benefits including: Online professional development, a library of news and articles, networking forums, Faculties with tailored content, scholarship programs, an industry journal, mentoring program, events & conferences and advocacy.

== Education ==
ANZIIF is a registered training organisation (RTO) and provides education and training products and services to the insurance and financial services industries. AQF qualifications are offered via distance learning and online and are open to members and non-members of ANZIIF. They are offered in the sectors of general insurance, insurance broking, loss adjusting, life insurance, risk management.

ANZIIF runs Tier 1 and Tier 2 RG146 programs, the minimum training required by the Australian Securities and Investments Commission (ASIC) by individuals selling financial products.

Corporate training programs and RTO options are provided for companies in the industry who do not have their own RTO or training arms.

On the short course level, ANZIIF provides a range of conferences, seminars, training and networking opportunities to members and non-members to support the careers of insurance professionals.

In 2015 ANZIIF announced a collaboration with the National Insurance Brokers Association, wherein ANZIIF would become NIBA's preferred provider of broking education. NIBA College ceased to take new enrolments from this point forward.

== Community ==
=== Corporate Supporter program ===
The Corporate Supporter network comprises a diverse group of companies, large and small, who all have the same desire to see the industry and its people succeed. The Corporate Supporter program was introduced to fund projects that benefit both the insurance industry and the public. The program has three main goals:

1. Promote and lift the profile of the insurance industry
2. Support people working in the industry
3. Help communities understand the role insurance and risk play in their lives.

=== Careers ===
A lack of understanding of insurance and opportunities to work in the industry prompted ANZIIF to create the Careers in Insurance initiative. This initiative highlights the scope and size of the industry, as well the vast breath of work opportunities. 100,000 copies of a ‘Careers in Insurance' booklet were given to every high school, university, business school and TAFE in Australia and New Zealand. A website was also designed to educate the public on the importance of the insurance industry to the community and its career opportunities.

=== Industry awards ===
ANZIIF hosts both the Australian Insurance Industry Awards and the New Zealand Insurance Industry Awards to honour the achievements of companies and individuals within the insurance market each year.
