= Winnie Laban =

New Zealand politician

The Honourable Luamanuvao Dame Winnie Laban DNZM QSO
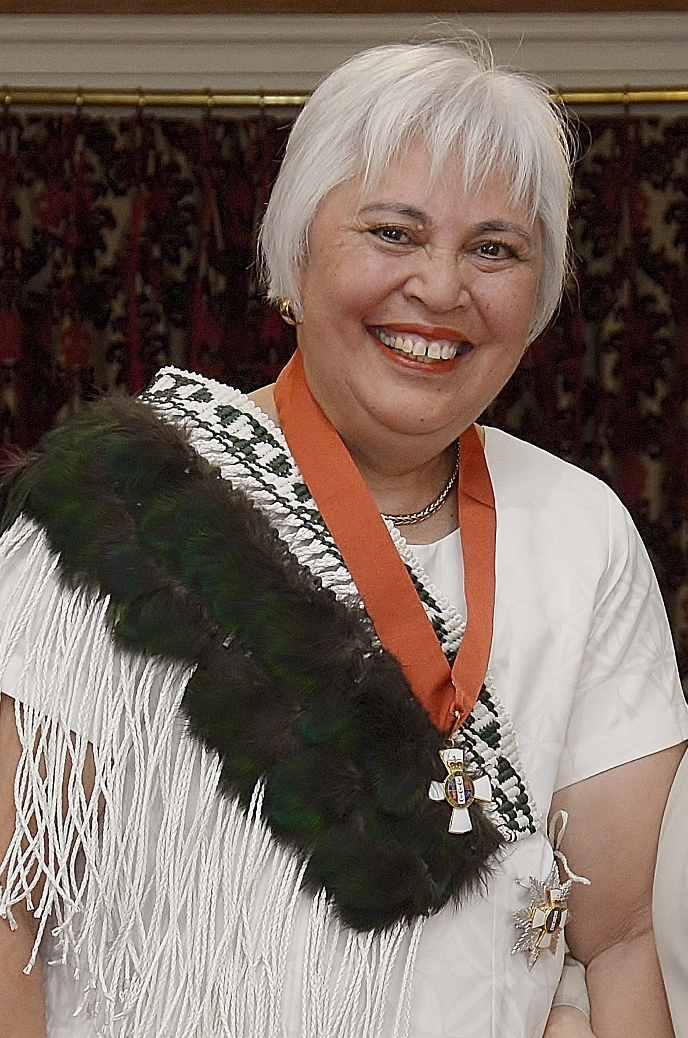
- Laban in 2018

8th Minister of Pacific Island Affairs
- In office 5 November 2007 – 19 November 2008
- Prime Minister: Helen Clark
- Preceded by: Phil Goff
- Succeeded by: Georgina te Heuheu

4th Minister for the Community and Voluntary Sector
- In office 19 October 2005 – 5 November 2007
- Prime Minister: Helen Clark
- Preceded by: Rick Barker
- Succeeded by: Ruth Dyson

Member of the New Zealand Parliament for Mana
- In office 27 July 2002 – 15 October 2010
- Preceded by: Graham Kelly
- Succeeded by: Kris Faafoi

Member of the New Zealand Parliament for Labour party list
- In office 27 November 1999 – 27 July 2002

Personal details
- Born: 14 August 1955 (age 71) Wellington, New Zealand
- Party: Labour
- Spouse: Peter Swain
- Relations: Ken Laban (brother)

Luamanuvao Dame Winifred Alexandra Laban DNZM QSO (born 14 August 1955) is a former New Zealand politician. She served as the Member of Parliament (MP) for the Mana electorate, representing the Labour Party, and was the Labour Party's spokesperson for Pacific Island Affairs and for interfaith dialogue. Laban served as the Assistant Vice-Chancellor (Pasifika) at Te Herenga Waka—Victoria University of Wellington from 2010 to 2024, and is a respected leader in the local Pasifika community.

== Early life ==
Laban was born in Wellington on 14 August 1955 to Samoan parents, Ta'atofa Kenneth Laban and Emi Tunupopo. Laban's maternal grandfather, Fauono Tunupopo Patu had been a member of the Samoan Legislative Assembly before independence in 1962, and on her paternal side her grandfather, Leutele Va’afusuaga Poutoa, served as a member of the first independent government of Samoa and was the Minister of Lands in that first democratically elected Samoan government.

Her parents were public servants in Samoa at the time they emigrated in 1954 to take up government positions in Wellington, New Zealand and also to ensure that any children they had gained New Zealand citizenship. Laban grew up in Wainuiomata with her younger brother Ken Laban, who subsequently served as a policeman, a community worker, sports commentator and as a local body politician.

She was educated at Erskine College, and Wellington Girls' College from 1969 to 1971.

After leaving school, she worked as a family therapist and community development worker, for the Māori Affairs Department where she focused particularly on the Pasifika community of New Zealand.

Kara Puketapu the head of the Māori Affairs Department encouraged her to formally study social work, using an admission provision for the entry of over-20s. Laban graduated with a diploma in social work from the Victoria University of Wellington, and later in development studies from Massey University.

She later worked as a probation officer.

In 1981 she was involved in protests against the Springbok Tour of New Zealand.

== Member of Parliament ==
New Zealand Parliament
Years	Term	Electorate	List	Party
1999–2002	46th	List	33	Labour
2002–2005	47th	Mana	20	Labour
2005–2008	48th	Mana	20	Labour
2008–2010	49th	Mana	11	Labour

When she was 34 she was asked by Sonja Davies to stand for parliament but had declined as she couldn't stomach the policies known as “Rogernomics” that the Labour government was implementing at the time.

Laban changed her mind when in 1998 at the age of 44, she took a weeping call from an uncle who worked at Wainuiomata's Kensons car part factory which was closing without warning or any redundancy being offered to the 100 workers who were losing their jobs.

What I saw was people from Wainui, mainly men, who just looked as though the life had been knocked out of them. A job is also about mana… The first thing I thought – I don’t want New Zealand to lose her heart.

— Winnie Laban.

Outraged by the impact of the closing and the 1991 Employment Contracts Act on Māori, Pacific Island and Pākehā working-class people coupled with the desire of many in the Pacific community to have a woman representing them in Parliament she put herself forward as a candidate for the Labour Party.

Laban was first elected to Parliament in the 1999 election as a list MP, becoming New Zealand's first Pacific Island woman MP. In the 2002 election she successfully contested the Mana electorate, formerly held by Labour MP Graham Kelly. In 2005 she was re-elected by a majority of 6,734 votes She was Minister of Pacific Island Affairs (5 November 2007 – 19 November 2008). Labour was defeated in the 2008 election, depriving Laban of her ministerial role, but Laban retained her electorate seat and most of her majority.

In December 2009 her Mental Health (Compulsory Assessment and Treatment) Amendment Bill, which would grant greater rights to the families of those seeking or undergoing treatment, was drawn from the member's ballot. The bill was defeated at its first reading.

On 10 August 2010 Laban announced she would resign from Parliament to take up a position as an assistant vice-chancellor at Victoria University of Wellington, leading to a by-election in the Mana electorate. She ceased being a member of parliament on 15 October 2010.

== Patronage and memberships ==
In 2008 she was made Patron of the Cancer Society Relay for Life. In 2013 she was made a Patron of the Wainuiomata Pasifika Education Success Initiative. She was chair of the Pacific Arts Committee from 2013 to 2014. She was appointed to the Creative New Zealand Arts Council in 2014. She has been a member of the National University of Samoa Council since 2012 and the Institute of Judicial Studies Board since 2011. From 2017 to 2020 she was a member of the Australasian Association for Institutional Research. Since 2017 she has been a member of the New Zealand Institute of Directors, the Commissioner of Police's National Pacific Advisory Forum, and an Auditor for the Academic Quality Agency for New Zealand Universities.

Her husband Peter Swain coauthored the memoir of longtime Prime Minister of Samoa Tuilaʻepa Saʻilele Malielegaoi.

== Honours ==
In 1992, Laban was bestowed the Samoan matai chiefly title Luamanuvao from the village of Vaiala, Vaimauga, in recognition of her work. In the 2011 New Year Honours, she was appointed a Companion of the Queen's Service Order for services as a Member of Parliament. She was appointed a Dame Companion of the New Zealand Order of Merit in the 2018 Queen's Birthday Honours, for services to education and the Pacific community. At the 2020 Women of Influence Awards in New Zealand, Laban received a lifetime achievement award. In 2023, Laban received an honorary doctorate from the National University of Samoa.

Political offices
Preceded by Phil Goff	Minister of Pacific Island Affairs; 2007–2008	Succeeded by Georgina te Heuheu
New Zealand Parliament
Preceded by Graham Kelly	Member of Parliament for Mana; 2002–2010	Succeeded by Kris Faafoi
