= Jan Logie =

New Zealand politician (born 1969)

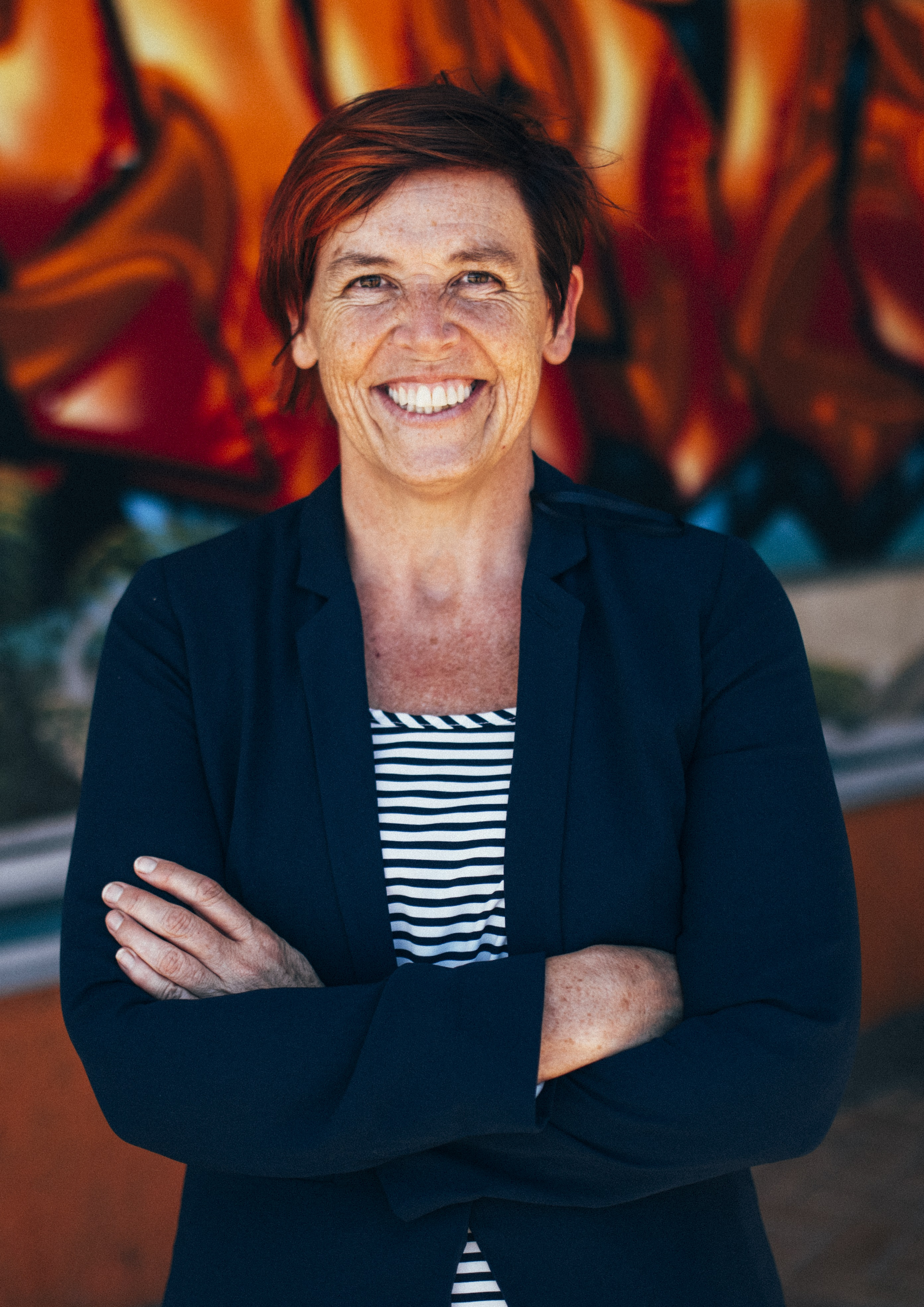
- Logie in 2019

Parliamentary Under-Secretary for Justice
- In office 26 October 2017 – 6 November 2020
- Prime Minister: Jacinda Ardern
- Minister: Andrew Little

Member of the New Zealand Parliament for Green party list
- In office 30 November 2011 – 14 October 2023

Personal details
- Born: 26 October 1969 (age 57) Invercargill, New Zealand
- Party: Green
- Education: University of Otago
- Website: Green Party profile

Heather Janet Logie (born 26 October 1969) is a New Zealand politician and a former member of the New Zealand House of Representatives. She is a member of the Green Party of Aotearoa New Zealand.

== Early life and career ==
Logie was born in Invercargill in 1969. She graduated from the University of Otago with a BA in politics and served as Women's Coordinator for the New Zealand Union of Students' Associations from 1993 to 1996. She lived and worked in Japan as an Assistant Language Teacher on the JET Programme. She has previously worked for Women's Refuge, the Hutt Valley Youth Health Service, the New Zealand YWCA and the New Zealand Centre for Sustainable Cities.

Logie described herself as a "lefty, feminist lesbian" in her maiden speech to Parliament. She lives in the Porirua suburb of Cannons Creek.

== Political career ==
New Zealand Parliament
| Years | Term | Electorate | List | Party |
|---|---|---|---|---|
| 2011–2014 | 50th | List | 9 | Green |
| 2014–2017 | 51st | List | 10 | Green |
| 2017–2020 | 52nd | List | 6 | Green |
| 2020–2023 | 53rd | List | 5 | Green |

=== Fifth National Government, 2011–2017 ===
Logie has stood as the Green Party candidate in the Mana electorate since the 2010 by-election, in which she placed third with 1,543 votes. She entered Parliament for the first time as a list MP in 2011 as the ninth-ranked of the 14 Green MPs.

Logie was a member of the Social Services and Community committee from 2011 to 2018, including as chair of the committee for her final 18 months. She has held many Green Party spokesperson roles including for the women's, immigration, human rights, rainbow issues, children and social development portfolios and as Green Party musterer (whip).

She was re-elected for a second term as a Green Party list MP during the 2014 New Zealand general election.

In 2015, Logie created a cross-party group to look at and advocate for LGBTI rights. This group consisted of Logie, Catherine Delahunty, Denise Roche, James Shaw, and Kevin Hague (Green), Chris Bishop and Paul Foster-Bell (National), David Seymour (ACT), Denis O'Rourke (NZ First), and Louisa Wall, Nanaia Mahuta and Trevor Mallard (Labour).

Two member's bills in Logie's name were introduced in the 2014–17 term of Parliament. The Equal Pay Amendment Bill was introduced in March 2017 but defeated at its first reading. The bill would have required the publication of statistical information related to remuneration rates for men and women working the same roles. The Domestic Violence Victims' Protection Bill was introduced in December 2016 and was enacted in July 2018. It created special leave entitlements for workers affected by domestic violence.

=== Sixth Labour Government, 2017–2023 ===
Jan Logie was re-elected for a third term on the Green Party list during the 2017 New Zealand general election.

When the Labour Party and the Green Party formed a new government with New Zealand First after the 2017 election, Logie was appointed as the Parliamentary Undersecretary to the Minister of Justice Andrew Little with a focus on domestic and sexual violence issues. She was responsible for the establishment of the Government's cross-agency programme with the goal of ending family and violence.

Logie was re-elected for a fourth term on the Green Party list during the 2020 New Zealand general election. Her appointment as Parliamentary Under-Secretary was not renewed for a second term. Instead, Green Party co-leader Marama Davidson was appointed Minister for the Prevention of Family and Sexual Violence.

In December 2022, Logie confirmed that she would retire from Parliament during the 2023 New Zealand general election. She also stated that she would continue working hard for the Green Party until the next general election.

== Political views ==
Logie has voted progressively on legislation including to support all stages of the Marriage (Definition of Marriage) Amendment Act 2013, the End of Life Choice Act 2019, and the Abortion Legislation Act 2020.
