= Chris Finlayson =

New Zealand politician

The Honourable Chris Finlayson KC
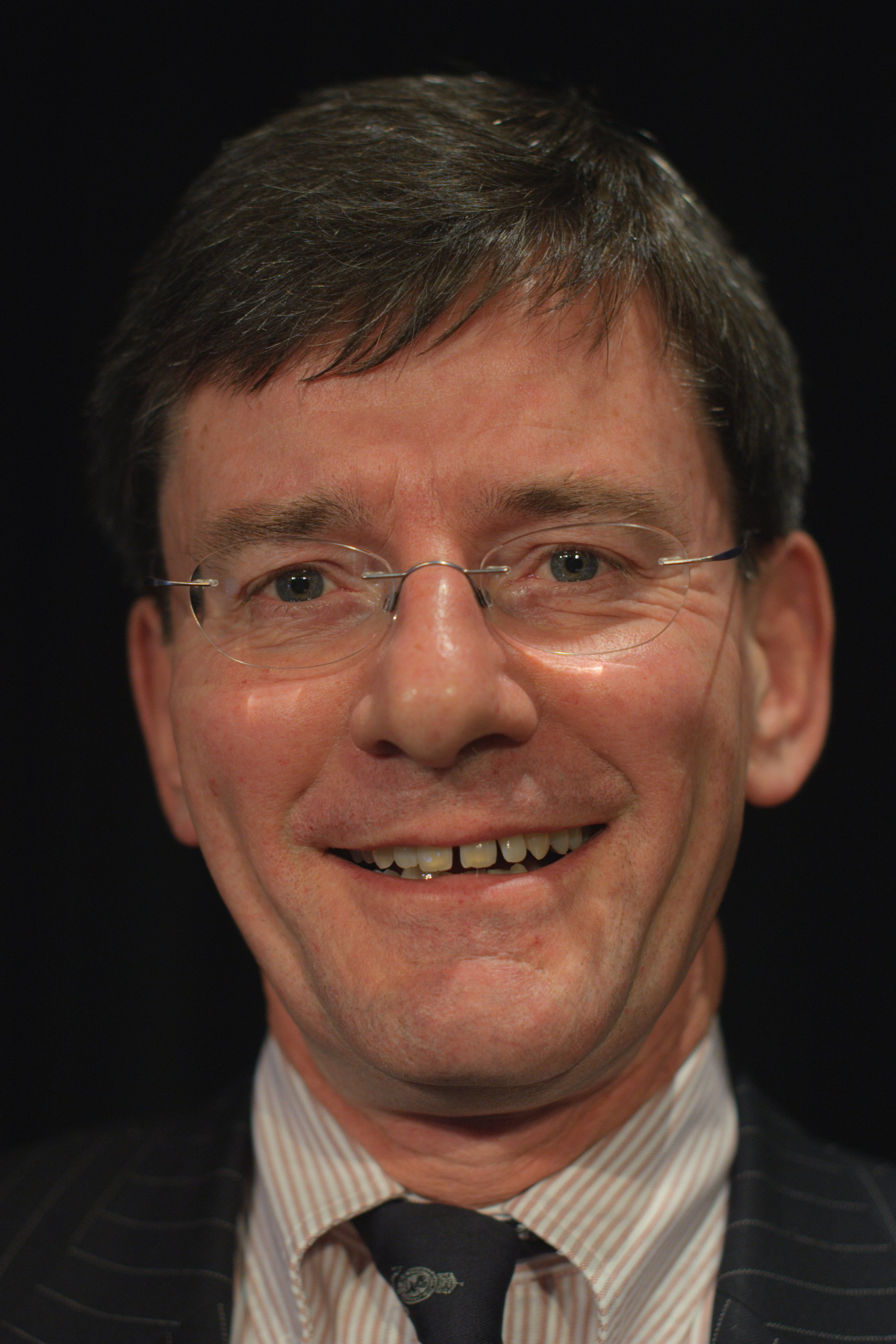

33rd Attorney-General of New Zealand
- In office 19 November 2008 – 26 October 2017
- Prime Minister: John Key; Bill English
- Preceded by: Michael Cullen
- Succeeded by: David Parker

Minister for Treaty of Waitangi Negotiations
- In office 19 November 2008 – 26 October 2017
- Prime Minister: John Key; Bill English
- Preceded by: Michael Cullen
- Succeeded by: Andrew Little

Minister for Arts, Culture and Heritage
- In office 19 November 2008 – 13 October 2014
- Prime Minister: John Key
- Preceded by: Helen Clark
- Succeeded by: Maggie Barry

Member of the New Zealand Parliament for National Party List
- In office 17 September 2005 – 30 January 2019
- Succeeded by: Agnes Loheni

Personal details
- Born: Christopher Francis Finlayson; 1956 (age 69–70) Wellington, New Zealand
- Party: National Party
- Relatives: Annette King (second cousin); Chester Borrows (third cousin)
- Occupation: Lawyer

Christopher Francis Finlayson KC (born 1956) is a New Zealand lawyer and former Member of Parliament, representing the National Party.

He was elected to Parliament in 2005. In the Fifth National Government, from 2008 to 2017, he was Attorney-General and Minister for Treaty of Waitangi Negotiations. He left politics to return to his legal career in January 2019.

== Early life ==
Finlayson grew up in the Wellington suburb of Khandallah. He has three siblings.

He attended St Benedict's Convent School and St. Patrick's College, where he participated in debating and drama and was head prefect in 1974. Finlayson joined the National Party in 1974 while still at St Patrick's College, after having had a long conversation with Keith Holyoake at Parliament the previous year. He was an active party member in the Karori and Ōhāriu electorates, including periods as Karori branch chair in the 1980s.

He graduated with a BA in Latin and French and an LLM from Victoria University of Wellington.

Finlayson has been heavily involved in the arts community. He chaired Creative New Zealand's Arts Board from 1998 to 2001, and has twice been appointed to the board of the New Zealand Symphony Orchestra.

== Legal career ==
Finlayson was admitted to the Bar as a barrister and solicitor in 1981. He was a partner in Brandon Brookfield from 1986 to 1990 and then in Bell Gully from 1991 to 2003. In the 1990s, when Winston Peters was expelled from the National Party, Finlayson was a legal advisor to the party. He practised as a barrister sole at the Barristers.Comm chambers from 2003 until 2005, when he entered Parliament.

At Bell Gully he spent years fighting for Ngāi Tahu against the government, pursuing its treaty claims through a series of high-profile court battles. "I used to love going to the office in the morning when we were suing the Crown," Finlayson said in a speech in 2009. "Ngāi Tahu mastered the art of aggressive litigation, whether it was suing the Waitangi Tribunal and [National Treaty negotiations minister] Doug Graham or the Director-General of Conservation. It was take no prisoners and it resulted in a good settlement." The signing of the Treaty deal with Ngāi Tahu in 1997 was the highlight of his legal career.

Since his admission, Finlayson has appeared in all courts of New Zealand, including seven appearances before the Privy Council, including as counsel for the New Zealand Bar Association in Harley v McDonald [2001] 2 WLR 1749 and counsel for the British Government in R v Attorney General for England and Wales (a decision of the Privy Council delivered on 17 March 2003). He has extensive experience appearing before tribunals and local authorities in New Zealand. He taught at the Faculty of Law of Victoria University of Wellington.

Finlayson was a co-author of McGechan on Procedure, a text on the practice and procedure of the Courts of New Zealand, for its editions between1984 and 2008 and was the founding editor of the Procedure Reports of New Zealand. He has written papers on many subjects, including intellectual property, litigation and conflicts of interest and has presented New Zealand Law Society seminars on High Court practice, conflicts of interest and limitation.

On 13 December 2012, Finlayson was recommended by Prime Minister John Key for appointment by the Governor-General as Queen's Counsel, based on his role as Attorney-General, before representing New Zealand in the International Court of Justice in a case against Japan's whaling programme.

After completing nearly fourteen years as a member of Parliament, Finlayson returned to his legal career. He practices at Bankside Chambers in Auckland. High-profile cases he has been involved in include representing Labour MP Louisa Wall when she challenged the Labour Party over her deselection in 2020, representing Ngāi Tahu in its freshwater case against the Crown in the High Court in 2025, and advising Te Pāti Māori MPs on their Privileges Committee summons in 2025.

== Member of Parliament ==
New Zealand Parliament
Years	Term	Electorate	List	Party
2005–2008	48th	List	27	National
2008–2011	49th	List	14	National
2011–2014	50th	List	9	National
2014–2017	51st	List	8	National
2017–2019	52nd	List	9	National

Finlayson stood as National's candidate for the Mana electorate in the 2005 election, and was also ranked twenty-seventh on National's party list, making him the second most highly ranked National candidate who was not already an MP. While he failed to win Mana, losing by a margin of 6,734 votes, the National Party polled well on party votes and Finlayson was elected via the party list. Finlayson transferred to the safe Labour seat of Rongotai for the 2008 election, where he was routinely defeated by Annette King. Finlayson had no desire to be an electorate MP and often remarked that if he won the electorate he would be the first to ask for a recount. When offered the prospect of a safer seat, like Ōhāriu, Finlayson responded by convincing the incumbent Peter Dunne not to resign. National did win the party vote over Labour in Rongotai for the first time in 2014.

Finlayson's first term was spent in opposition. He was appointed as deputy chair of the Justice and Electoral select committee (2005–2008) and as a member of the Māori Affairs committee (2006–2008). He was National's shadow attorney-general and, under John Key, spokesperson for Treaty of Waitangi negotiations and arts, culture and heritage. When National formed a new government in 2008, Finlayson became Attorney-General and Minister for Treaty of Waitangi Negotiations (2008–2017). He was also Minister for Arts, Culture and Heritage (2008–2014), Associate Minister of Māori Development (2011–2017) and Minister responsible for the NZSIS and GCSB (2014–2017).

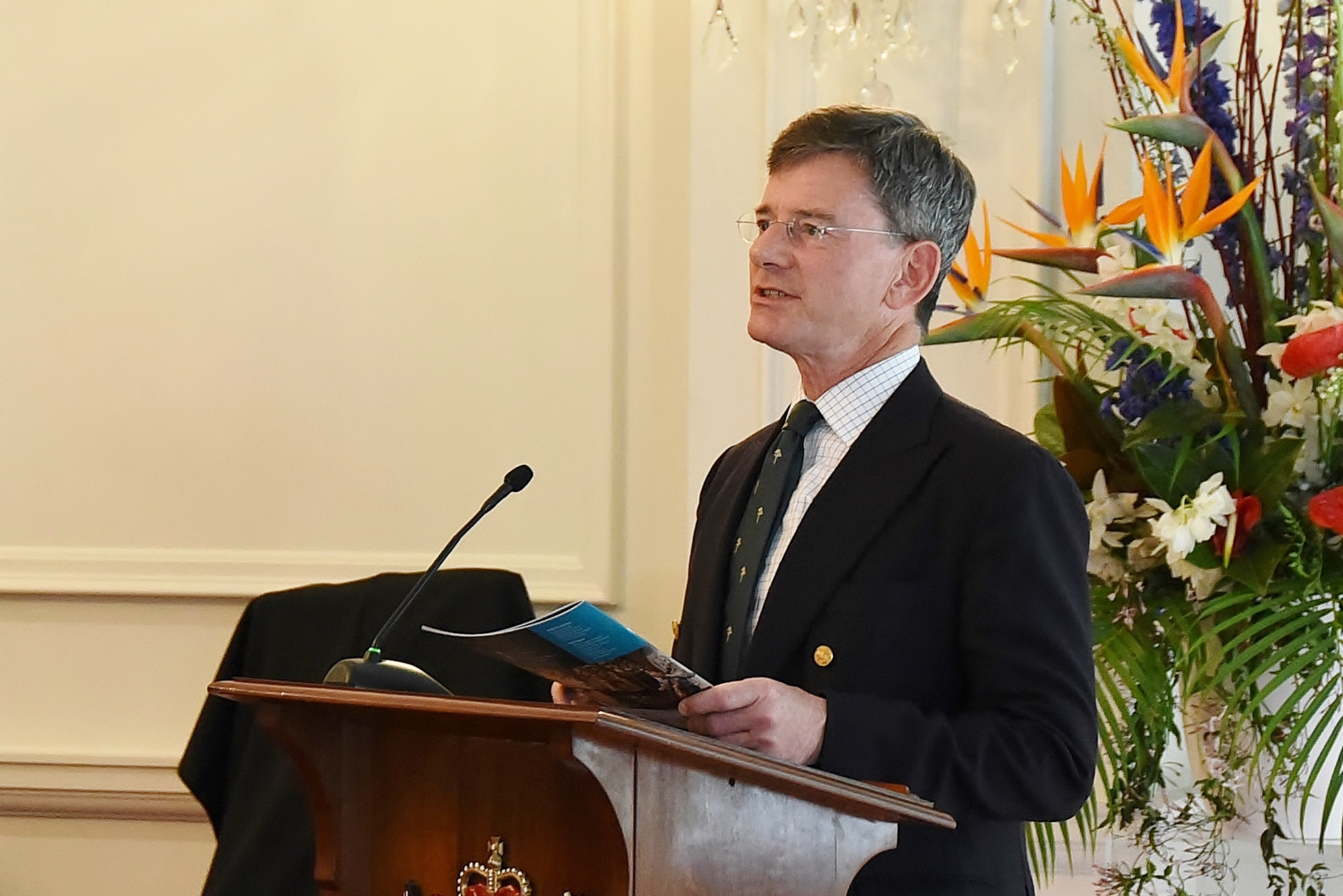
Finlayson speaking at the 30th Anniversary of the NZ String Quartet in 2017

As Attorney-General and Minister for Treaty of Waitangi Negotiations, Finlayson was successful in reaching an unprecedented number of Treaty settlements (59 over nine years) including with iwi he had previously represented in private practice. Academic Margaret Mutu, who negotiated the Ngāti Kahu settlement with Finlayson, described him as the "best qualified" Treaty settlements minister than any before, saying that Finlayson's perspective on the portfolio was one of "a lawyer with a conscience" remedying the honour of the Crown. He also chaired the Privileges Committee from 2012 to 2017. Being attorney-general had been Finlayson's principal political ambition and he regarded it as "the highlight of [his] legal career."

As Minister for Arts, Culture and Heritage, Finlayson progressed legislation enabling the development of Pukeahu National War Memorial Park ahead of the 100th anniversary of Anzac Day. In 2012, he conducted a review of the orchestra sector but ruled out disestablishing the national symphony orchestra. He briefly acted as Minister of Labour (2012–2013) when Kate Wilkinson resigned after the Royal Commission on the Pike River Coal Mine Tragedy reported back. He was also acting Minister for the Environment when Nick Smith resigned in 2012 and acting Minister of Justice when Judith Collins resigned in 2014. Finlayson was said to be interested in the role of Minister of Foreign Affairs after Murray McCully retired but missed out to Gerry Brownlee; New Zealand Herald writer Audrey Young described Finlayson as being "too important" in Treaty settlements to promote.

In June 2010 he was found by the registrar of pecuniary interests to have broken the rules in not declaring a directorship in his annual pecuniary interest return. In his memoir, Finlayson commented that his interest had not been pecuniary and he successfully campaigned to change the name of the register to be the "pecuniary and other interests" register.

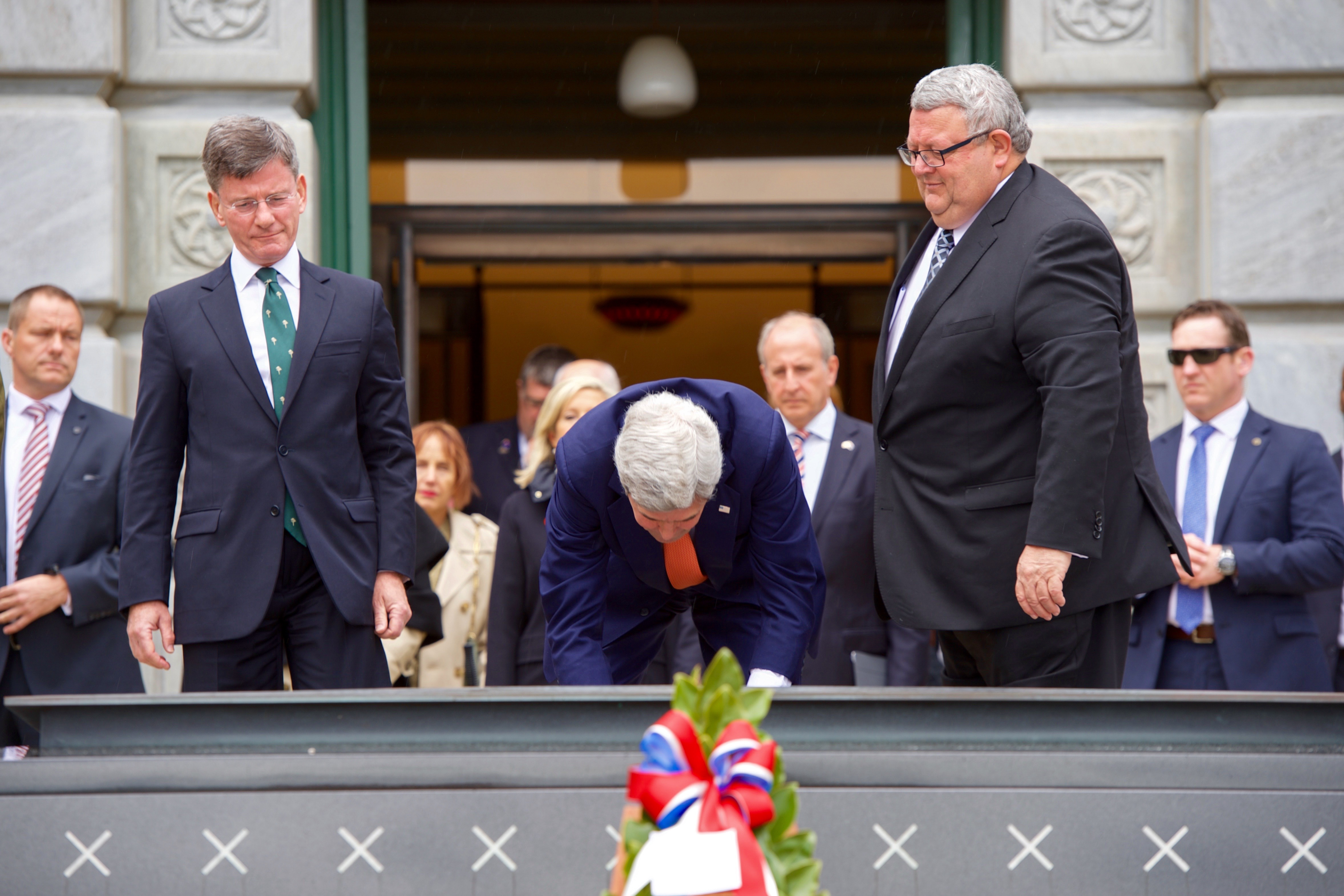
Finlayson (left) with US Secretary of State John Kerry and Gerry Brownlee at Pukeahu National War Memorial Park, Wellington, in 2016

He supported Simon Bridges as deputy leader of the National Party in 2016 and, after National lost the 2017 election, as leader in 2018, although later expressed regret for not supporting Steven Joyce. In opposition for the second time, Finlayson was again appointed as the shadow-attorney general and additionally as National's spokesperson for commerce, the NZSIS and the GCSB (2017–2018) and Crown-Māori relations and Pike River mine re-entry (2018–2019). He was on the intelligence and security committee from 2018 to 2019. His member's bill, the Administration of Justice (Reform of Contempt of Court) Bill, was drawn from the ballot and introduced in 2018. It was adopted by the Government and became law after Finlayson's retirement.

Finlayson left parliament in January 2019 after announcing his intention in November 2018 to return to his legal career. As part of his legacy, it was noted that at that time he had appointed all the Supreme Court other than the Chief Justice, all 10 members of the Court of Appeal, and 37 of the 46 High Court Judges. He has said the highlights of his political career had been:

- 2013: representing New Zealand in the International Court of Justice in a case against Japan's whaling programme.
- 2015: representing New Zealand on the United Nations Security Council in New York.
- 2008–2017: getting almost 60 Treaty settlements agreed.

== Political views ==
Finlayson describes himself as a "liberal conservative." He does not like populist politics or populist politicians such as Donald Trump or Winston Peters. He criticised the National Party leadership after he left Parliament in 2019 and repeated this criticism in his 2022 memoir, Yes, Minister.

In 2013, Finlayson voted against the Marriage (Definition of Marriage) Amendment Bill, a bill allowing same-sex couples to marry in New Zealand. He was the only openly gay member of Parliament to vote against the bill and cited his opposition came from his belief that "the state should not be involved in marriage at all."

He voted against the first reading of the End of Life Choice Bill in 2017.

After leaving politics, Finlayson has commented publicly on partnership under the Treaty of Waitangi and co-governance of public assets between the Crown and iwi/Māori. As Minister for Treaty of Waitangi Negotiations, Finlayson oversaw the introduction of formal shared governance as part of Treaty settlements, including the establishment of the Waikato River Authority which shares governance of the Waikato River between Waikato Regional Council and local iwi. Finlayson described co-governance as parties with shared interests and shared responsibility jointly setting priorities and managing a resource, although he noted that co-governance does not mean "co-government" and it would be impractical to apply to all government functions. The Labour Government which succeeded the government Finlayson had been part of promoted further opportunities for co-governance between iwi and the Crown, including in its Water Services Reform Programme. The National Party and ACT New Zealand opposed Labour's co-governance reforms and campaigned in the 2023 general election on rolling them back. Finlayson distanced himself from these perspectives, stating that co-governance "should be embraced, not feared." After the election, in which ACT campaigned for a referendum on rewriting the principles of the Treaty of Waitangi, Finlayson said he would not support such a referendum because it would "bring all the nutcases out" and cause division, but would support a review of the Treaty of Waitangi Act 1975.

== Selected published works ==
- Finlayson, Christopher Francis; Christmas, James (2021). He Kupu Taurangi: Treaty Settlements and the Future of Aotearoa New Zealand. Huia Publishers. p. 296. ISBN 978-1-77550-615-7. OL 39650317M. Wikidata Q124540179.

== Personal life ==
Finlayson has described himself as being an "odd fish" since he is gay as well as being a Catholic. He has no partner, and says he is celibate.

He is a distant cousin on his mother's side of former Labour MP Annette King. King was a second cousin to Finlayson’s mother through her Russ side (the Russ family were a large Nelson family) and is also related to Chester Borrows.

Political offices
Preceded by Michael Cullen	Attorney-General; 2008–2017	Succeeded by David Parker
Preceded by Michael Cullen	Minister Responsible for Treaty of Waitangi negotiations 2008–2017	Succeeded by Andrew Little
Preceded by Helen Clark	Minister of Arts, Culture and Heritage; 2008–2014	Succeeded by Maggie Barry
