= Hamish Campbell =

New Zealand politician and medical researcher

Hamish Campbell MP
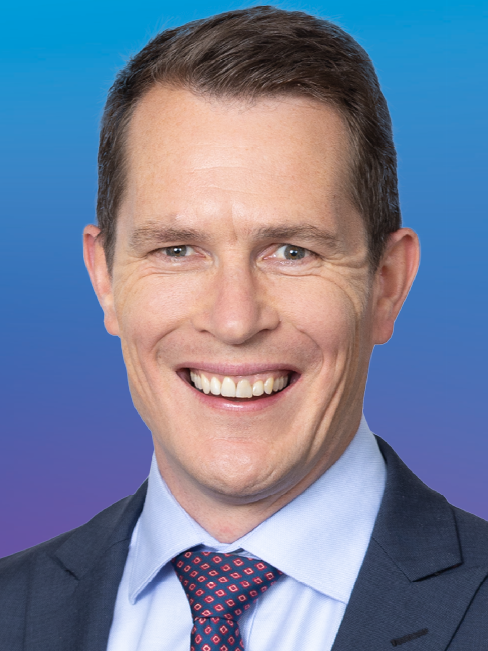
- Campbell in 2023

Member of the New Zealand Parliament for Ilam
- Incumbent
- Assumed office 14 October 2023
- Preceded by: Sarah Pallett

Personal details
- Born: 1979 or 1980 (age 46–47) Christchurch, New Zealand
- Party: National
- Spouse: Carol
- Children: 2
- Scientific career
- Education: University of Otago
- Thesis: The functions of p53 during an adenovirus infection (2007)

Hamish George Campbell (born 1979 or 1980) is a New Zealand politician and Member of Parliament in the House of Representatives for the National Party. He previously worked as a medical researcher and lecturer, and in his family's orchard business.

== Early life and career ==
Campbell was born in Christchurch and attended Avonhead Primary School and Christchurch Boys' High School, where he was deputy head boy. He received a Bachelor's degree in genetics and a PhD in viruses and cancer from the University of Otago. He later worked for the Children's Medical Research Institute and MS Research Australia, and lectured at the University of Sydney. Campbell also runs a flower delivery business and is involved in his family's apple orchard business.

== Political career ==
New Zealand Parliament
| Years | Term | Electorate | List | Party |
|---|---|---|---|---|
| 2023–2026 | 54th | Ilam | 63 | National |
| 2026–present | 55th | Ilam | 47 | National |

In May 2020, Campbell was selected to contest Wigram for the National Party at the 2020 election. He lost to the incumbent Megan Woods with less than half of her votes.

On 30 October 2022, Campbell was selected to contest the neighbouring electorate of Ilam in the 2023 New Zealand general election, as former Ilam MP Gerry Brownlee decided to stand as a list-only candidate after losing the electorate in 2020. On the night of the election, Campbell had a 7,830 vote lead over his nearest opponent, Raf Manji of The Opportunities Party. Campbell identified youth offending as a cause of crime in Ilam, and something he would like to address once in parliament, along with the cost of living.

During the 2026 New Zealand general election, Campbell contested the Ilam electorate for National. He was ranked 47th on the National Party list. On 7 November, Campbell retained Ilam by a large margin of 6,712 votes based on preliminary results.

== Personal life ==
Campbell is married. He and his wife have two children and live in the Christchurch suburb of Riccarton. In April 2025, 1News reported that Campbell was a member of the Christian religious sect known as the 'Two by Twos', who were being investigated by the New Zealand Police over allegations of sexual abuse.

New Zealand Parliament
| Preceded by Sarah Pallett | Member of Parliament for Ilam; 2023–present | Incumbent |
