= 2001 New Zealand National Party leadership election =

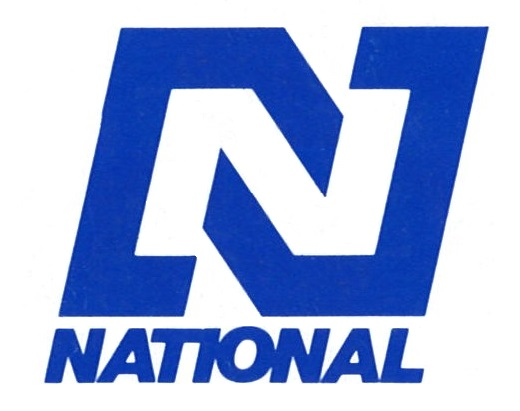
- 8 October 2001
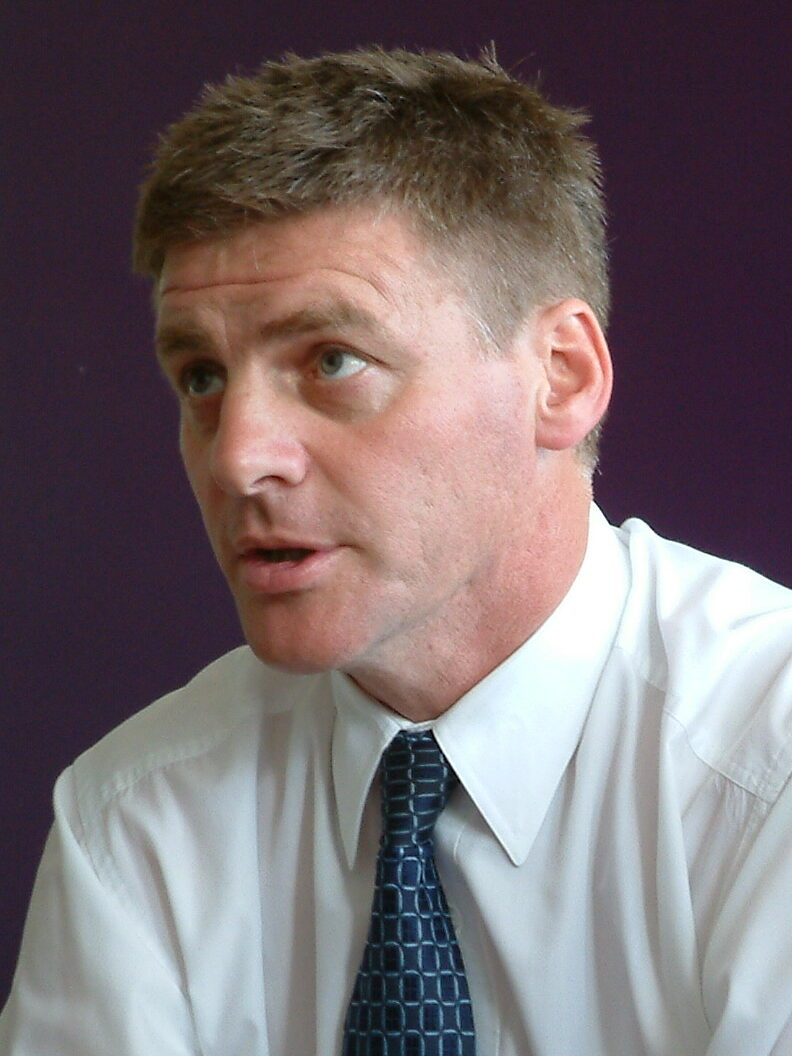
Candidate	Bill English
Popular vote	elected unopposed
Leader before election
Jenny Shipley
Leader after election
Bill English

The New Zealand National Party leadership election was an election for the National leadership position in 2001.

== Background ==
In October 2001, after months of speculation, Jenny Shipley resigned as leader of the National Party after being told she no longer had the support of the party caucus. Bill English was elected as her replacement unopposed (with Roger Sowry as his deputy), and consequently became Leader of the Opposition. However, he did not openly organise against Shipley, and according to The Southland Times "there was almost an element of 'aw, shucks, I'll do it then' about Mr English's ascension".

Aged 39 when he was elected, English became the second-youngest leader in the National Party's history, after Jim McLay (who was 38 when elected in 1984). He also became only the third Southlander to lead a major New Zealand political party, after Joseph Ward and Adam Hamilton.
