= Ilam (electorate) =

- Single-member general constituency for the New Zealand House of Representatives
- Interactive map of boundaries from the 2026 election
- Formation: 1996
- Region: Canterbury
- Character: Suburban
- Term: 3 years

Member for Ilam
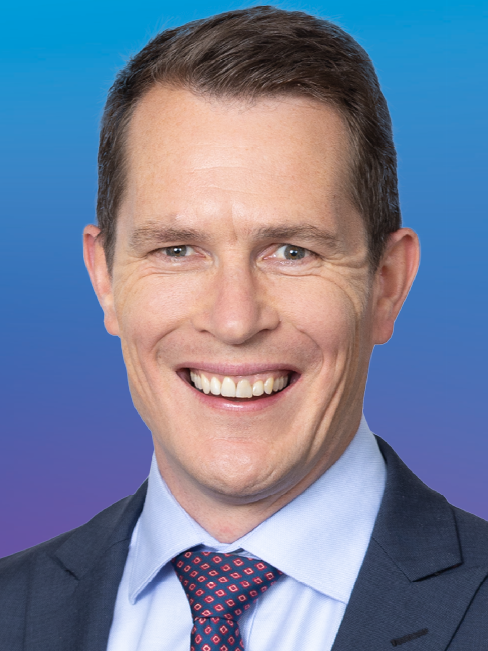
- Hamish Campbell since 14 October 2023
- Party: National
- Previous MP: Sarah Pallett (Labour)
Party vote distribution

Ilam is a New Zealand parliamentary electorate. Formed for the 1996 election, it was held by Gerry Brownlee of the National Party until the 2020 election, when Sarah Pallett of the Labour Party unseated Brownlee in an upset victory. The seat reverted to National when it was won by Hamish Campbell in the 2023 election.

== Population centres ==
Map of boundaries at the 2020 and 2023 general elections

Encompassing many of Christchurch's most affluent suburbs, Ilam was considered a safe National seat until the 2020 election. The electorate includes the suburbs of Riccarton (north of Riccarton Road), Upper Riccarton, Fendalton, Burnside, Avonhead, Merivale, Bishopdale, Ilam, Russley and Bryndwr. In 2008, the boundaries were Deans Avenue, the Avon River, Bealey Avenue, Papanui Road, Harewood Road, Russley Road, Ansonby Street, Cutts Road, Yaldhurst Road and Riccarton Road. The 2013/14 redistribution did not alter the boundaries of the Ilam electorate. The 2020 redistribution, however, added Avonhead from Wigram and a large section of Selwyn around McLeans Island and Christchurch Airport. The 2025 boundary review saw the electorate gain part of Northcote from Christchurch Central.

== History ==
The Ilam electorate was formed for the 1996 election, mostly evolving from the Fendalton electorate. Gerry Brownlee from the National Party was the first elected representative and held the electorate until 2020, when he lost the electorate to Labour's Sarah Pallett in an upset.

=== Members of Parliament ===
Unless otherwise stated, all MPs terms began and ended at a general election.

Key

National Labour United Future Green

| Election | Winner |
|---|---|
| 1996 election | Gerry Brownlee |
| 1999 election | Gerry Brownlee |
| 2002 election | Gerry Brownlee |
| 2005 election | Gerry Brownlee |
| 2008 election | Gerry Brownlee |
| 2011 election | Gerry Brownlee |
| 2014 election | Gerry Brownlee |
| 2017 election | Gerry Brownlee |
| 2020 election | Sarah Pallett |
| 2023 election | Hamish Campbell |
| 2026 election | Hamish Campbell |

=== List MPs ===
Members of Parliament elected from party lists in elections where that person also unsuccessfully contested the Ilam electorate. Unless otherwise stated, all MPs terms began and ended at general elections.

| Election | Winner |
|---|---|
| 2002 election | Marc Alexander |
| 2008 election | Kennedy Graham |
| 2011 election | Kennedy Graham |
| 2020 election | Gerry Brownlee |

== Election results ==
=== 2026 election ===
The next election was held on 7 November 2026. Candidates for Ilam are listed at Candidates in the 2026 New Zealand general election by electorate § Ilam. Official results will be available after 27 November 2026. Preliminary results have Hamish Campbell returning to parliament.

=== 2023 election ===
2023 general election: Ilam
| Notes: | Blue background denotes the winner of the electorate vote. Pink background denotes a candidate elected from their party list. Yellow background denotes an electorate win by a list member, or other incumbent. A ✓ or ✗ denotes status of any incumbent, win or lose respectively. | | | | | | |
| Party | Candidate | Votes | % | ±% | Party votes | % | ±% |
|---|---|---|---|---|---|---|---|
| National | Hamish Campbell | 18,693 | 44.01 | +6.32 | 18,452 | 43.01 | +13.55 |
| Opportunities | Raf Manji | 10,863 | 25.57 | — | 2,138 | 4.98 | +3.02 |
| Labour | ✗ Sarah Pallett | 9,010 | 21.21 | −24.46 | 9,395 | 21.90 | −22.77 |
| Green | Mike Davidson | 2,391 | 5.63 | −1.88 | 6,401 | 14.92 | +4.64 |
| Legalise Cannabis | Irinka Britnell | 488 | 1.15 | — | 179 | 0.42 | +0.25 |
| DemocracyNZ | Juanita O'Connell | 329 | 0.77 | — | 101 | 0.23 | — |
| New Conservatives | Chris O'Brien | 300 | 0.71 | −0.81 | 96 | 0.22 | −1.00 |
| ACT | | | | | 3,557 | 8.29 | −0.43 |
| NZ First | | | | | 1,729 | 4.03 | +2.27 |
| Te Pāti Māori | | | | | 265 | 0.62 | +0.38 |
| NZ Loyal | | | | | 150 | 0.35 | — |
| NewZeal | | | | | 85 | 0.20 | — |
| Freedoms NZ | | | | | 55 | 0.13 | — |
| Animal Justice | | | | | 50 | 0.12 | — |
| Women's Rights | | | | | 47 | 0.11 | — |
| Leighton Baker Party | | | | | 44 | 0.10 | — |
| New Nation | | | | | 23 | 0.05 | — |
| Informal votes | | 402 | | | 136 | | |
| Total valid votes | | 42,476 | | | 42,903 | | |
| Turnout | | 42,903 | | | | | |
| National gain from Labour | Majority | 7,830 | 18.43 | +26.40 | | | |

=== 2020 election ===
2020 general election: Ilam
| Notes: | Blue background denotes the winner of the electorate vote. Pink background denotes a candidate elected from their party list. Yellow background denotes an electorate win by a list member, or other incumbent. A ✓ or ✗ denotes status of any incumbent, win or lose respectively. | | | | | | |
| Party | Candidate | Votes | % | ±% | Party votes | % | ±% |
|---|---|---|---|---|---|---|---|
| Labour | Sarah Pallett | 19,825 | 45.67 | +24.13 | 19,497 | 44.67 | +13.47 |
| National | ✗ Gerry Brownlee | 16,362 | 37.69 | −8.91 | 12,861 | 29.46 | −23.17 |
| Green | David Bennett | 3,260 | 7.51 | +0.88 | 4,489 | 10.28 | +3.14 |
| ACT | Paul Gilbert | 1,956 | 4.50 | +3.84 | 3,807 | 8.72 | +8.10 |
| New Conservative | Simon Walmisley | 661 | 1.52 | +0.89 | 533 | 1.22 | +0.88 |
| Outdoors | Heidi Jensen-Warren | 286 | 0.65 | – | 45 | 0.10 | +0.07 |
| Advance NZ | Toni Pengelley | 247 | 0.56 | – | 210 | 0.48 | – |
| Opportunities | | | | | 856 | 1.96 | −1.54 |
| NZ First | | | | | 769 | 1.76 | −1.99 |
| Māori Party | | | | | 108 | 0.24 | −0.13 |
| Legalise Cannabis | | | | | 77 | 0.17 | −0.03 |
| ONE | | | | | 54 | 0.12 | – |
| Sustainable NZ | | | | | 41 | 0.09 | – |
| TEA | | | | | 21 | 0.04 | – |
| Social Credit | | | | | 20 | 0.04 | +0.03 |
| Vision NZ | | | | | 6 | 0.01 | – |
| Heartland | | | | | 3 | 0.01 | – |
| Informal votes | | 835 | | | 248 | | |
| Total valid votes | | 43,402 | | | 43,645 | | |
| Turnout | | 43,645 | | | | | |
| Labour gain from National | Majority | 3,463 | 7.97 | +31.12 | | | |

=== 2017 election ===
2017 general election: Ilam
| Notes: | Blue background denotes the winner of the electorate vote. Pink background denotes a candidate elected from their party list. Yellow background denotes an electorate win by a list member, or other incumbent. A ✓ or ✗ denotes status of any incumbent, win or lose respectively. | | | | | | |
| Party | Candidate | Votes | % | ±% | Party votes | % | ±% |
|---|---|---|---|---|---|---|---|
| National | ✓ Gerry Brownlee | 16,577 | 46.60 | −11.48 | 19,134 | 52.63 | −5.09 |
| Independent | Raf Manji | 8,321 | 23.39 | — | | | |
| Labour | Anthony Rimell | 7,662 | 21.54 | −1.96 | 11,341 | 31.20 | +13.59 |
| Green | David Lee | 2,359 | 6.63 | −5.58 | 2,602 | 7.14 | −5.80 |
| ACT | Paul Gilbert | 235 | 0.66 | −0.51 | 224 | 0.62 | −0.37 |
| Conservative | Martin Frauenstein | 225 | 0.63 | −2.78 | 124 | 0.34 | −3.34 |
| Independent | Martin Thomas Francis | 195 | 0.55 | — | | | |
| NZ First | | | | | 1,364 | 3.75 | −1.36 |
| Opportunities | | | | | 1,273 | 3.50 | — |
| Māori Party | | | | | 134 | 0.37 | −0.11 |
| Legalise Cannabis | | | | | 74 | 0.20 | −0.77 |
| United Future | | | | | 28 | 0.08 | −0.18 |
| People's Party | | | | | 18 | 0.05 | — |
| Ban 1080 | | | | | 14 | 0.04 | −0.02 |
| Outdoors | | | | | 11 | 0.03 | — |
| Internet | | | | | 8 | 0.02 | −0.65 (Note: 2017 Internet Party swing is relative to the votes for Internet-Mana in 2014; it shared a party list with Mana Party in the 2014 election) |
| Democrats | | | | | 5 | 0.01 | −0.03 |
| Mana Party | | | | | 3 | 0.01 | −0.66 (Note: 2017 Mana Party swing is relative to the votes for Internet-Mana in 2014; it shared a party list with the Internet Party in the 2014 election) |
| Informal votes | | 389 | | | 91 | | |
| Total valid votes | | 35,574 | | | 36,364 | | |
| Turnout | | 36,448 | | | | | |
| National hold | Majority | 8,236 | 23.15 | −11.43 | | | |

=== 2014 election ===
2014 general election: Ilam
| Notes: | Blue background denotes the winner of the electorate vote. Pink background denotes a candidate elected from their party list. Yellow background denotes an electorate win by a list member, or other incumbent. A ✓ or ✗ denotes status of any incumbent, win or lose respectively. | | | | | | |
| Party | Candidate | Votes | % | ±% | Party votes | % | ±% |
|---|---|---|---|---|---|---|---|
| National | ✓ Gerry Brownlee | 19,981 | 58.08 | −2.42 | 20,377 | 57.72 | −0.62 |
| Labour | James Macbeth Dann | 8,083 | 23.50 | +3.16 | 6,238 | 17.67 | −1.51 |
| Green | John Kelcher | 4,201 | 12.21 | −3.14 | 4,574 | 12.96 | −0.46 |
| Conservative | John Stringer | 1,172 | 3.41 | +1.10 | 1,300 | 3.68 | +1.59 |
| ACT | Gareth Veale | 402 | 1.17 | +0.41 | 349 | 0.99 | −0.16 |
| Internet | Beverley Ballantine | 321 | 0.93 | +0.93 | | | |
| Māori Party | Benita Wakefield | 243 | 0.71 | +0.71 | 171 | 0.48 | −0.02 |
| NZ First | | | | | 1,806 | 5.11 | +1.16 |
| Internet Mana | | | | | 233 | 0.67 | +0.51 (Note: 2014 Internet Mana swing is relative to the votes for Mana in 2011; it shared a party list with Internet in the 2014 election.) |
| Legalise Cannabis | | | | | 96 | 0.27 | −0.04 |
| United Future | | | | | 92 | 0.26 | −0.46 |
| Civilian | | | | | 23 | 0.07 | +0.07 |
| Ban 1080 | | | | | 21 | 0.06 | +0.06 |
| Democrats | | | | | 14 | 0.04 | −0.01 |
| Independent Coalition | | | | | 7 | 0.02 | +0.02 |
| Focus | | | | | 3 | 0.01 | +0.01 |
| Informal votes | | 448 | | | 73 | | |
| Total valid votes | | 34,851 | | | 35,377 | | |
| National hold | Majority | 11,898 | 34.58 | −5.49 | | | |

=== 2011 election ===
2011 general election: Ilam
| Notes: | Blue background denotes the winner of the electorate vote. Pink background denotes a candidate elected from their party list. Yellow background denotes an electorate win by a list member, or other incumbent. A ✓ or ✗ denotes status of any incumbent, win or lose respectively. | | | | | | |
| Party | Candidate | Votes | % | ±% | Party votes | % | ±% |
|---|---|---|---|---|---|---|---|
| National | ✓ Gerry Brownlee | 20,070 | 60.50 | +3.51 | 19,934 | 58.34 | +5.52 |
| Labour | John Parsons | 6,758 | 20.34 | −3.78 | 6,552 | 19.18 | −8.31 |
| Green | Kennedy Graham | 5,099 | 15.35 | +3.10 | 4,586 | 13.42 | +5.22 |
| Conservative | Roger Larkins | 767 | 2.31 | +2.31 | 714 | 2.09 | +2.09 |
| United Future | Vanessa Roberts | 280 | 0.84 | −0.39 | 247 | 0.72 | −0.67 |
| ACT | Gareth Veale | 252 | 0.76 | −1.38 | 394 | 1.15 | −2.69 |
| NZ First | | | | | 1,350 | 3.95 | +1.54 |
| Māori Party | | | | | 171 | 0.50 | −0.67 |
| Legalise Cannabis | | | | | 106 | 0.31 | −0.01 |
| Mana | | | | | 53 | 0.16 | +0.16 |
| Libertarianz | | | | | 29 | 0.08 | +0.03 |
| Alliance | | | | | 17 | 0.05 | −0.04 |
| Democrats | | | | | 16 | 0.05 | +0.03 |
| Informal votes | | 667 | | | 196 | | |
| Total valid votes | | 33,226 | | | 34,169 | | |
| Turnout | | 34,551 | 76.34 | −5.75 | | | |
| National hold | Majority | 13,312 | 40.07 | 7.29 | | | |

=== 2008 election ===
2008 general election: Ilam
| Notes: | Blue background denotes the winner of the electorate vote. Pink background denotes a candidate elected from their party list. Yellow background denotes an electorate win by a list member, or other incumbent. A ✓ or ✗ denotes status of any incumbent, win or lose respectively. | | | | | | |
| Party | Candidate | Votes | % | ±% | Party votes | % | ±% |
|---|---|---|---|---|---|---|---|
| National | ✓ Gerry Brownlee | 20,648 | 56.89 | +3.76 | 19,541 | 52.82 | +3.58 |
| Labour | Sam Yau | 8,755 | 24.12 | −7.15 | 10,168 | 27.48 | −7.05 |
| Green | Kennedy Graham | 4,444 | 12.25 | +6.56 | 3,034 | 8.20 | +2.85 |
| Progressive | Craig Hutchinson | 828 | 2.28 | +0.36 | 550 | 1.49 | +0.24 |
| ACT | Brian Davidson | 775 | 2.14 | −0.37 | 1,422 | 3.84 | +1.95 |
| United Future | John Pickering | 449 | 1.24 | −3.56 | 516 | 1.39 | −2.18 |
| Kiwi | David Weusten | 393 | 1.08 | – | 199 | 0.54 | – |
| NZ First | | | | | 893 | 2.41 | −1.00 |
| Bill and Ben | | | | | 199 | 0.54 | – |
| Māori Party | | | | | 195 | 0.53 | +0.36 |
| Legalise Cannabis | | | | | 118 | 0.32 | +0.21 |
| Family Party | | | | | 61 | 0.16 | – |
| Alliance | | | | | 35 | 0.09 | +0.02 |
| Libertarianz | | | | | 21 | 0.06 | +0.02 |
| Pacific | | | | | 20 | 0.05 | – |
| Workers Party | | | | | 12 | 0.03 | – |
| Democrats | | | | | 6 | 0.02 | −0.01 |
| RONZ | | | | | 3 | 0.01 | −0.01 |
| RAM | | | | | 2 | 0.01 | – |
| Informal votes | | 427 | | | 136 | | |
| Total valid votes | | 36,292 | | | 36,995 | | |
| Turnout | | 37,283 | 82.09 | | | | |
| National hold | Majority | 11,893 | 32.77 | +10.91 | | | |

=== 2005 election ===
2005 general election: Ilam
| Notes: | Blue background denotes the winner of the electorate vote. Pink background denotes a candidate elected from their party list. Yellow background denotes an electorate win by a list member, or other incumbent. A ✓ or ✗ denotes status of any incumbent, win or lose respectively. | | | | | | |
| Party | Candidate | Votes | % | ±% | Party votes | % | ±% |
|---|---|---|---|---|---|---|---|
| National | ✓ Gerry Brownlee | 19,010 | 53.13 | | 17,949 | 49.24 | |
| Labour | Julian Blanchard | 11,189 | 31.27 | | 12,589 | 34.54 | |
| Green | Lois Griffiths | 2,034 | 5.68 | | 1,952 | 5.36 | |
| United Future | Marc Alexander | 1,716 | 4.80 | | 1,304 | 3.58 | |
| ACT | Jo Giles | 895 | 2.50 | | 689 | 1.89 | |
| Progressive | Zemin Zhang | 686 | 1.92 | | 454 | 1.25 | +0.24 |
| Independent | Blair Anderson | 165 | 0.46 | | | | |
| NZ First | Quentin Finlay | 85 | 0.24 | | 1,245 | 3.42 | |
| Māori Party | | | | | 62 | 0.17 | +0.17 |
| Destiny | | | | | 57 | 0.16 | |
| Legalise Cannabis | | | | | 38 | 0.10 | |
| Christian Heritage | | | | | 33 | 0.09 | |
| Alliance | | | | | 29 | 0.08 | |
| Libertarianz | | | | | 15 | 0.04 | |
| Democrats | | | | | 8 | 0.02 | |
| RONZ | | | | | 8 | 0.02 | |
| 99 MP | | | | | 7 | 0.02 | |
| One NZ | | | | | 6 | 0.02 | |
| Family Rights | | | | | 4 | 0.02 | |
| Direct Democracy | | | | | 2 | 0.01 | |
| Informal votes | | 468 | | | 100 | | |
| Total valid votes | | 35,780 | | | 36,451 | | |
| Turnout | | 36,671 | 82.82 | −3.30 | | | |
| National hold | Majority | 7,821 | 21.86 | | | | |

=== 2002 election ===
2002 general election: Ilam
| Notes: | Blue background denotes the winner of the electorate vote. Pink background denotes a candidate elected from their party list. Yellow background denotes an electorate win by a list member, or other incumbent. A ✓ or ✗ denotes status of any incumbent, win or lose respectively. | | | | | | |
| Party | Candidate | Votes | % | ±% | Party votes | % | ±% |
|---|---|---|---|---|---|---|---|
| National | ✓ Gerry Brownlee | 15,773 | 46.91 | −1.08 | 10,255 | 29.87 | −12.26 |
| Labour | Richard Pole | 11,901 | 35.39 | +7.76 | 11,413 | 33.24 | +4.54 |
| United Future | Marc Alexander | 1,760 | 5.23 | +3.75 (Note: 2002 United Future swing is relative to the sum of votes for United NZ and Future NZ in 1999; the two parties merged in 2000.) | 2,842 | 8.28 | +6.25 |
| Green | Lois Griffiths | 1,418 | 4.22 | −0.11 | 2,018 | 5.88 | +1.51 |
| ACT | Nigel Mattison | 1,327 | 3.95 | +0.46 | 3,482 | 10.14 | +0.09 |
| Christian Heritage | Gideon Pieters | 569 | 1.69 | +1.69 | 459 | 1.34 | +1.27 |
| Alliance | Lynda Boyd | 439 | 1.31 | −4.29 | 507 | 1.48 | −4.93 |
| Progressive | Robert Logan Peck | 437 | 1.30 | +1.30 | 540 | 1.57 | +1.57 |
| NZ First | | | | | 2,400 | 6.99 | +4.59 |
| ORNZ | | | | | 270 | 0.79 | +0.79 |
| Legalise Cannabis | | | | | 125 | 0.36 | −0.36 |
| One NZ | | | | | 14 | 0.04 | +0.00 |
| Mana Māori | | | | | 4 | 0.01 | +0.00 |
| NMP | | | | | 1 | 0.00 | −0.01 |
| Informal votes | | 515 | | | 81 | | |
| Total valid votes | | 33,624 | | | 34,330 | | |
| Turnout | | 34,511 | 79.52 | | | | |
| National hold | Majority | 3,872 | 11.52 | −8.84 | | | |

=== 1999 election ===
1999 general election: Ilam
| Notes: | Blue background denotes the winner of the electorate vote. Pink background denotes a candidate elected from their party list. Yellow background denotes an electorate win by a list member, or other incumbent. A ✓ or ✗ denotes status of any incumbent, win or lose respectively. | | | | | | |
| Party | Candidate | Votes | % | ±% | Party votes | % | ±% |
|---|---|---|---|---|---|---|---|
| National | ✓ Gerry Brownlee | 16,012 | 47.99 | +3.73 | 14,168 | 42.05 | −2.62 |
| Labour | Alison Wilkie | 9,220 | 27.63 | +10.33 | 9,669 | 28.70 | +5.72 |
| Alliance | Lois Griffiths | 1,870 | 5.60 | −8.38 | 2,159 | 6.41 | −1.87 |
| Green | Evan Thomas Alty | 1,444 | 4.33 | +4.33 | 1,474 | 4.37 | +4.37 |
| NZ First | Andrew Gin | 1,443 | 4.33 | −2.91 | 810 | 2.40 | −5.26 |
| ACT | Nigel Mattison | 1,166 | 3.49 | +1.11 | 3,385 | 10.05 | +1.55 |
| Independent | Denis O'Rourke | 809 | 2.42 | | | | |
| Christian Heritage | Geoff Francis | 700 | 2.10 | +2.10 | 28 | 0.07 | +0.07 |
| Christian Democrats | Kevin Harper | 494 | 1.48 | +1.48 | 433 | 1.29 | +1.29 |
| Independent | Janet MiddleMiss | 150 | 0.45 | | | | |
| Natural Law | Brendan Rhodes | 56 | 0.17 | −0.12 | 34 | 0.10 | +0.03 |
| United NZ | | | | | 248 | 0.74 | −1.26 |
| Legalise Cannabis | | | | | 241 | 0.72 | −0.27 |
| Libertarianz | | | | | 105 | 0.31 | +0.30 |
| Animals First | | | | | 52 | 0.15 | +0.04 |
| McGillicuddy Serious | | | | | 52 | 0.15 | −0.06 |
| South Island | | | | | 56 | 0.17 | +0.17 |
| One NZ | | | | | 13 | 0.04 | +0.04 |
| NMP | | | | | 4 | 0.01 | +0.01 |
| Republican | | | | | 4 | 0.01 | +0.01 |
| Mana Māori | | | | | 3 | 0.01 | ±0.00 |
| Mauri Pacific | | | | | 2 | 0.01 | +0.01 |
| The People's Choice | | | | | 2 | 0.01 | +0.01 |
| Freedom Movement | | | | | 1 | 0.00 | +0.00 |
| Informal votes | | | | | 306 | | |
| Total valid votes | | 33,364 | | | 33,693 | | |
| National win new seat | Majority | 6,792 | 20.36 | | | | |

=== 1996 election ===
1996 general election: Ilam
| Notes: | Blue background denotes the winner of the electorate vote. Pink background denotes a candidate elected from their party list. Yellow background denotes an electorate win by a list member, or other incumbent. A ✓ or ✗ denotes status of any incumbent, win or lose respectively. | | | | | | |
| Party | Candidate | Votes | % | ±% | Party votes | % | ±% |
|---|---|---|---|---|---|---|---|
| National | Gerry Brownlee | 16,561 | 44.26 | | 16,835 | 44.67 | |
| Labour | Eamon Daly | 6,471 | 17.30 | | 8,663 | 22.98 | |
| United NZ | ✗ Margaret Austin | 5,447 | 14.56 | | 752 | 2.00 | |
| Alliance | Jan Davey | 5,229 | 13.98 | | 3,119 | 8.28 | |
| NZ First | Helen Broughton | 2,707 | 7.24 | | 2,887 | 7.66 | |
| ACT | Nigel Mattison | 892 | 2.38 | | 3,203 | 8.50 | |
| Natural Law | Andrew Sanderson | 108 | 0.29 | | 28 | 0.07 | |
| Christian Coalition | | | | | 1,582 | 4.20 | |
| Legalise Cannabis | | | | | 375 | 0.99 | |
| McGillicuddy Serious | | | | | 79 | 0.21 | |
| Progressive Green | | | | | 53 | 0.14 | |
| Animals First | | | | | 42 | 0.11 | |
| Ethnic Minority Party | | | | | 27 | 0.07 | |
| Green Society | | | | | 15 | 0.04 | |
| Superannuitants & Youth | | | | | 11 | 0.03 | |
| Conservatives | | | | | 7 | 0.02 | |
| Asia Pacific United | | | | | 4 | 0.01 | |
| Mana Māori | | | | | 3 | 0.01 | |
| Libertarianz | | | | | 3 | 0.01 | |
| Advance New Zealand | | | | | 2 | 0.01 | |
| Te Tawharau | | | | | 0 | 0.00 | |
| Informal votes | | 355 | | | 80 | | |
| Total valid votes | | 37,415 | | | 37,690 | | |
| National win new seat | Majority | 10,090 | 26.97 | | | | |
