= Bill English =

Prime Minister of New Zealand from 2016 to 2017

The Right Honourable Sir Bill English KNZM
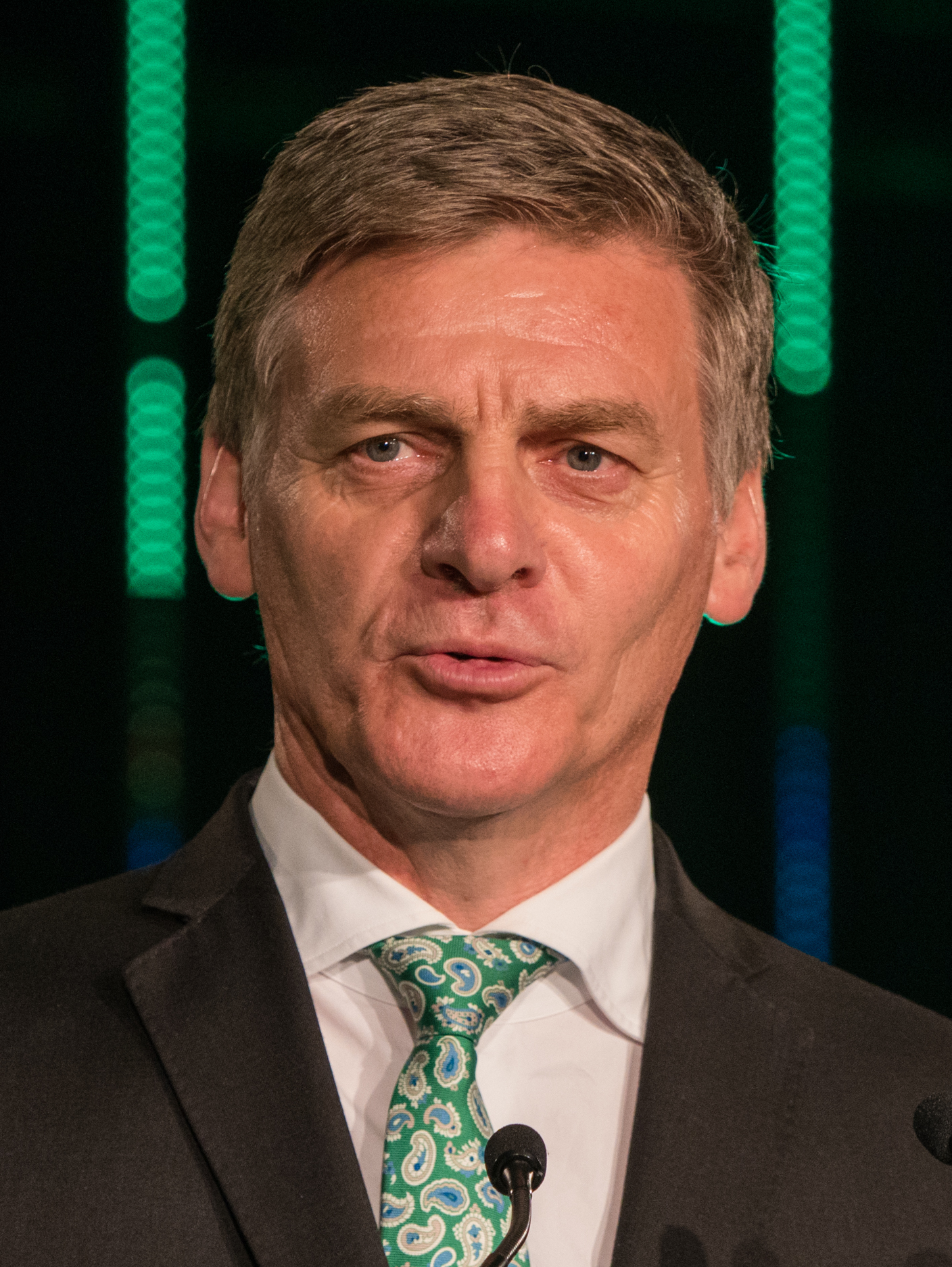
- English in 2017

39th Prime Minister of New Zealand
- In office 12 December 2016 – 26 October 2017
- Monarch: Elizabeth II
- Governor-General: Patsy Reddy
- Deputy: Paula Bennett
- Preceded by: John Key
- Succeeded by: Jacinda Ardern

29th Leader of the Opposition
- In office 26 October 2017 – 27 February 2018
- Prime Minister: Jacinda Ardern
- Deputy: Paula Bennett
- Preceded by: Jacinda Ardern
- Succeeded by: Simon Bridges
- In office 8 October 2001 – 28 October 2003
- Prime Minister: Helen Clark
- Deputy: Roger Sowry
- Preceded by: Jenny Shipley
- Succeeded by: Don Brash

9th Leader of the National Party
- In office 12 December 2016 – 27 February 2018
- Deputy: Paula Bennett
- Preceded by: John Key
- Succeeded by: Simon Bridges
- In office 8 October 2001 – 28 October 2003
- Deputy: Roger Sowry
- Preceded by: Jenny Shipley
- Succeeded by: Don Brash

17th Deputy Prime Minister of New Zealand
- In office 19 November 2008 – 12 December 2016
- Prime Minister: John Key
- Preceded by: Michael Cullen
- Succeeded by: Paula Bennett

39th Minister of Finance
- In office 19 November 2008 – 12 December 2016
- Prime Minister: John Key
- Preceded by: Michael Cullen
- Succeeded by: Steven Joyce
- In office 31 January 1999 – 22 June 1999
- Prime Minister: Jenny Shipley
- Preceded by: Bill Birch
- Succeeded by: Bill Birch

Deputy Leader of the National Party
- In office 27 November 2006 – 12 December 2016
- Leader: John Key
- Preceded by: Gerry Brownlee
- Succeeded by: Paula Bennett
- In office 7 February 2001 – 6 October 2001
- Leader: Jenny Shipley
- Preceded by: Wyatt Creech
- Succeeded by: Roger Sowry

3rd Treasurer of New Zealand
- In office 22 June 1999 – 10 December 1999
- Prime Minister: Jenny Shipley
- Preceded by: Bill Birch
- Succeeded by: Michael Cullen
Constituency
Member of the New Zealand Parliament for National Party List
In office 20 September 2014 – 13 March 2018
Succeeded by	Maureen Pugh
Member of the New Zealand Parliament for Clutha-Southland
In office 12 October 1996 – 20 September 2014
Preceded by	New electorate
Succeeded by	Todd Barclay
Member of the New Zealand Parliament for Wallace
In office 27 October 1990 – 12 October 1996
Preceded by	Derek Angus
Succeeded by	Electorate abolished

Personal details
- Born: Simon William English; 30 December 1961 (age 64) Lumsden, New Zealand
- Party: National
- Spouse: Mary Scanlon
- Children: 6
- Parent(s): Mervyn English; Norah O'Brien
- Relatives: Rachel Buchanan (niece)
- Education: University of Otago; Victoria University
- Website: Official website

Sir Simon William English KNZM (born 30 December 1961) is a New Zealand former politician who served as the 39th prime minister of New Zealand from 2016 to 2017 and leader of the National Party from 2001 to 2003 and 2016 to 2018. He had previously served as the 17th deputy prime minister of New Zealand and minister of finance from 2008 to 2016 under John Key and the Fifth National Government.

A farmer and public servant before entering politics, English was elected to the New Zealand Parliament in 1990 as the National Party's candidate in the Wallace electorate. He was elevated to Cabinet in 1996 and in 1999 was made minister of finance, although he served for less than a year due to his party's loss at the 1999 general election. In October 2001, English replaced Jenny Shipley as the leader of the National Party (and consequently as Leader of the Opposition). He led the party to its worst defeat at the 2002 general election, and as a consequence, in October 2003 he was replaced as leader by Don Brash.

In November 2006, after Brash's resignation, English became deputy leader under John Key. After National's victory at the 2008 general election, he became deputy prime minister and was also made minister of finance for the second time. Under English's direction New Zealand's economy maintained steady growth during National's three terms of government. He became a list-only MP after stepping down as an electorate MP at the 2014 general election.

John Key resigned as leader of the National Party and prime minister in December 2016. English won the resulting leadership election unopposed and was sworn in as prime minister on 12 December 2016. His tenure was only ten months, and included a three-month election campaign. In the 2017 general election, National won the largest number of seats but fell short of a majority. The parties holding the balance of power declined to support the existing government, and English was subsequently replaced as prime minister by Jacinda Ardern, leader of the Labour Party. English initially continued on as Leader of the Opposition, but resigned as leader of the National Party on 27 February 2018 and left parliament two weeks later.

== Early life ==
Simon William English was born on 30 December 1961 at Lumsden Maternity Centre in Lumsden, a small town in the South Island of New Zealand. He is the eleventh of twelve children of Mervyn English and Norah (née O'Brien) English. His parents purchased "Rosedale", a mixed sheep and cropping farm in Dipton, Southland from Mervyn's uncle, Vincent English, a bachelor, in 1944. English was born in the maternity unit at Lumsden.

English attended St Thomas's School in Winton, then boarded at St. Patrick's College in Upper Hutt, where he became head boy. He played in the first XV of the school's rugby team. English went on to study commerce at the University of Otago, where he was a resident at Selwyn College, and then completed an honours degree in English literature at Victoria University of Wellington.

After finishing his studies, English returned to Dipton and farmed for a few years. From 1987 to 1989, he worked in Wellington as a policy analyst for the New Zealand Treasury, at a time when the free market policies favoured by Labour's finance minister Roger Douglas (known collectively as "Rogernomics") were being implemented.

English joined the National Party in 1980, while at Victoria University. He served for a period as chairman of the Southland branch of the Young Nationals, and became a member of the Wallace electorate committee. After moving to Wellington, he served for periods on the Island Bay and Miramar electorate committees, respectively.

== Fourth National Government (1990–1999) ==
New Zealand Parliament
Years	Term	Electorate	List	Party
1990–1993	43rd	Wallace		National
1993–1996	44th	Wallace		National
1996–1999	45th	Clutha-Southland	9	National
1999–2002	46th	Clutha-Southland	4	National
2002–2005	47th	Clutha-Southland	1	National
2005–2008	48th	Clutha-Southland	4	National
2008–2011	49th	Clutha-Southland	2	National
2011–2014	50th	Clutha-Southland	2	National
2014–2017	51st	List	2	National
2017–2018	52nd	List	1	National

At the 1990 general election, English stood as the National candidate in Wallace, the former electorate of National's first full-time leader, Adam Hamilton. The incumbent, Derek Angus, was retiring. English was elected with a large majority amid that year's National landslide. He would hold this seat, renamed Clutha-Southland in 1996, until 2014. He and three other newly elected National MPs (Tony Ryall, Nick Smith, and Roger Sowry) were soon identified as rising stars in New Zealand politics, and at various points were dubbed the "brat pack", the "gang of four", and the "young Turks". In his first term in parliament, English chaired a select committee into social services. He was made a parliamentary under-secretary in 1993, serving under the Minister of Health.

=== First period in cabinet (1996–1999) ===
In early 1996, English was elevated to cabinet by Prime Minister Jim Bolger, becoming the Minister for Crown Health Enterprises and Associate Minister of Education (to Wyatt Creech). He was 34 at the time, becoming the cabinet's youngest member. After the 1996 general election, the National Party was forced into a coalition with New Zealand First to retain government. In the resulting cabinet reshuffle, English emerged as Minister of Health. However, as a condition of the coalition agreement, NZ First's Neil Kirton (a first-term MP) was made Associate Minister of Health, effectively becoming English's deputy. This arrangement was described in the press as a "shotgun marriage", and there were frequent differences of opinion between the two ministers. After their relationship became unworkable, Kirton was sacked from the role in August 1997, with the agreement of NZ First leader Winston Peters.

As Minister of Health, English was responsible for continuing the reforms to the public health system that National had begun after the 1990 general election. The reforms were unpopular, and health was perceived as one of the government's weaknesses, with the health portfolio consequently being viewed as a challenge. English believed that the unpopularity of the reforms was in part due to a failure in messaging, and encouraged his National colleagues to avoid bureaucratic and money-focused language (such as references to "balance sheets" and "user charges") and instead talk about the improvements to services the government's reforms would bring. He also rejected the idea that public hospitals could be run as commercial enterprises, a view which some of his colleagues had previously promoted.

By early 1997, as dissatisfaction with Bolger's leadership began to grow, English was being touted as a potential successor, along with Jenny Shipley and Doug Graham. His age (35) was viewed as the main impediment to a successful leadership run. National's leadership troubles were resolved in December 1997, when Bolger resigned and Shipley was elected to the leadership unopposed. English had been a supporter of Bolger as leader, but Shipley reappointed him Minister of Health in her new cabinet.

English was promoted to Minister of Finance in a reshuffle in January 1999, a position which was at the time subordinate to the Treasurer, Bill Birch. After a few months, the pair switched positions as part of Birch's transition to retirement, with English assuming the senior portfolio. In early interviews, he emphasised his wish to be seen as a pragmatist rather than an ideologue, and said that the initiatives of some of his predecessors (Roger Douglas's "Rogernomics" and Ruth Richardson's "Ruthanasia") had focused on "fruitless, theoretical debates" when "people just want to see problems solved".

== Opposition (1999–2008) ==
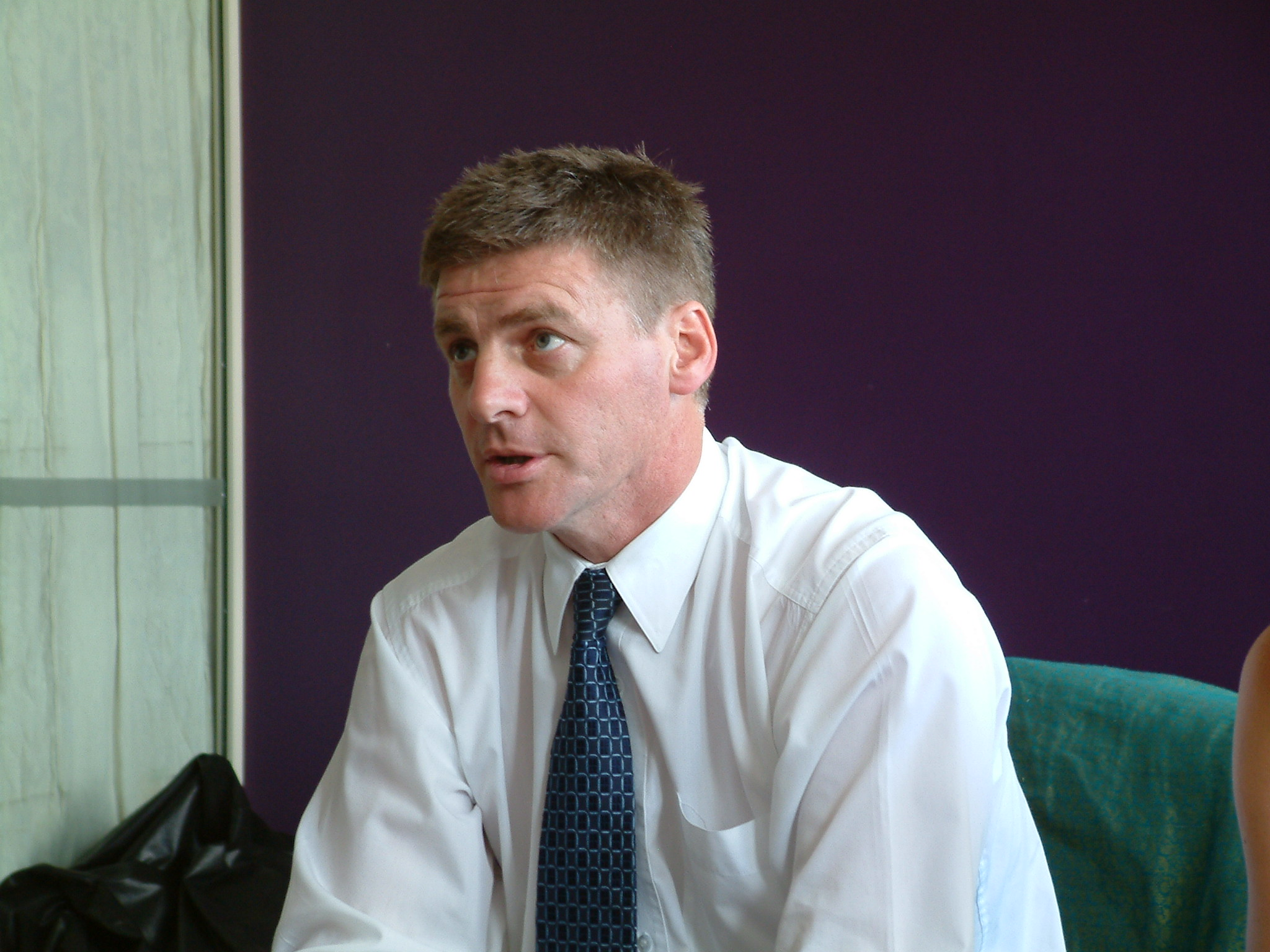
English in February 2005

After the National Party lost the 1999 election to Helen Clark's Labour Party, English continued on in the shadow cabinet as National's spokesperson for finance. He was elected deputy leader of the party in February 2001, following the resignation of Wyatt Creech, with Gerry Brownlee being his unsuccessful opponent.

=== Leader of the Opposition ===
In October 2001, after months of speculation, Jenny Shipley resigned as leader of the National Party after being told she no longer had the support of the party caucus. English was elected as her replacement unopposed (with Roger Sowry as his deputy), and consequently became Leader of the Opposition. However, he did not openly organise against Shipley, and according to The Southland Times "there was almost an element of 'aw, shucks, I'll do it then' about Mr English's ascension".

Aged 39 when he was elected, English became the second-youngest leader in the National Party's history, after Jim McLay (who was 38 when elected in 1984). He also became only the third Southlander to lead a major New Zealand political party, after Joseph Ward and Adam Hamilton. However, English failed to improve the party's performance. In the 2002 election, National suffered its worst electoral defeat ever, gaining barely more than twenty percent of the vote. English described it as "the worst day of my political life". Both party insiders and the general public were split as to how much to blame him for the loss, but most of the party believed that English would be able to rebuild National's support.

By late 2003, however, National's performance in opinion polls remained poor. The party had briefly increased its popularity in the year following the election, but by October its support had fallen to levels only slightly better than what it achieved in the last ballot. English also appeared in a boxing match for a charity against entertainer Ted Clarke. This did not boost his polling or that of the National party either, with suggestions that it devalued his image as a serious politician. Don Brash, former governor of the Reserve Bank and a relative newcomer to politics, began to build up support to replace English. On 28 October, Brash gained sufficient backing in Caucus to defeat English in a leadership contest.

=== Shadow cabinet roles and deputy leader ===
On 2 November 2003, when Brash changed responsibilities for certain MPs, English became National's spokesman for education, ranked at fifth place in the party's parliamentary hierarchy. He remained in parliament after the 2005 election. In his new shadow education portfolio, English performed strongly, and remained a party favourite despite his election defeat as leader in 2002, eventually being returned to the finance portfolio in August 2004 as deputy spokesman (while still retaining responsibility for education).

In November 2006, Brash resigned as leader. English was considered as a potential replacement leader (running against John Key) or deputy leader (against incumbent Gerry Brownlee) in the ensuing leadership election. However, a contest was avoided when the MPs agreed a Key/English ticket would run unopposed in a display of party unity. English took over the deputy leadership and the finance portfolio in the Key shadow cabinet.

== Fifth National Government (2008–2017) ==
=== Deputy Prime Minister and Minister of Finance (2008–2016) ===
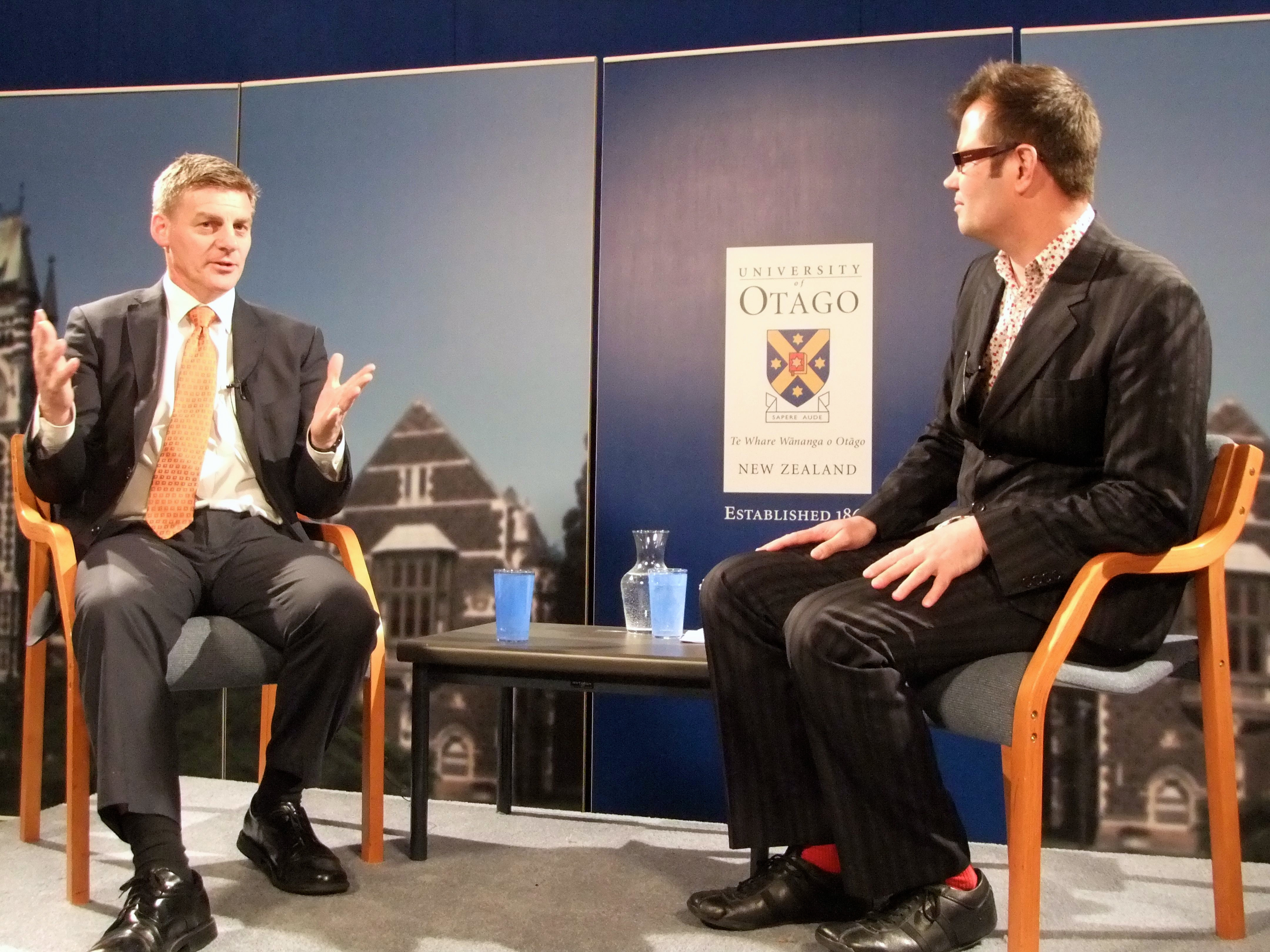
English interviewed as a part of the Vote Chat forum at the University of Otago, October 2011

At the 2008 election, English was re-elected by his electorate, winning by a margin of about 15,500 votes. He became Deputy Prime Minister of New Zealand and Minister of Finance in the fifth National Government, being sworn into office on 19 November 2008 and continued to serve in those roles until becoming Prime Minister on 12 December 2016. He was also made Minister of Infrastructure in National's first term of government and Minister responsible for Housing New Zealand Corporation and minister responsible for the New Zealand flag consideration process in its third.

He was comfortably re-elected in Clutha-Southland in the 2011 election but opted to run as a party-list candidate in 2014.

The pairing of John Key as leader of the National Party and English as his deputy has been compared to that of Bob Hawke and Paul Keating (in Australia) and Tony Blair and Gordon Brown (in the UK).

English acceded to the role of finance minister during the 2008 financial crisis. In response to New Zealand's rising debt, English made budget deficit-reduction his main priority. His first budget outlined three focuses in New Zealand's financial recovery: "improving the business environment and removing roadblocks to growth; investment in productive infrastructure; and improving the way government works". One of his first acts was creating the National Infrastructure Unit, charged with formulating a plan for infrastructure projects and investments. He commissioned a government-wide spending review, with an aim to reducing government expenditure—with the exceptions of a two-year stimulus package and long-term increases on infrastructure spending.

In April 2011, the Opposition criticised English for suggesting that New Zealand businesses could use New Zealand's low wages to help it compete with Australia. The National Government campaigned for re-election in 2011 on its economic record. The Government boasted growth for five consecutive quarters up to mid-2010, totalling 1.6% of real GDP.

Strong growth resulted in a surplus of $473 million for the 2015/16 financial year, projected to rise to $8.5 billion by 2020/21. In his 2016 Economic and Fiscal Update address, English stated that reducing debt and tackling the costs of the 2016 Kaikōura earthquake were higher priorities than reducing rates of tax.

==== Allowances issue ====
In 2009, the media, including TVNZ and TV3 revealed that English was receiving about NZ$900 a week as part of a living allowance for ministers, to live in his own NZ$1.2 million Wellington home. At the time, English also received $276,200 in his annual salary as deputy prime minister. It was also revealed other ministers with homes in the capital city were also claiming accommodation allowances. On 3 August 2009, Prime Minister John Key started a review of the housing allowances claimed by cabinet ministers. English subsequently paid back $12,000 and only claimed about $24,000 a year in living allowances. The Auditor-General's office said in September 2009 that they were making "preliminary enquiries" into parliamentary housing expenses in response to a letter of complaint from Progressive party leader Jim Anderton. Two days later English stated that he would no longer take up any housing allowance and had paid back all the allowance he had received since the November 2008 election.

=== Prime Minister (2016–2017) ===
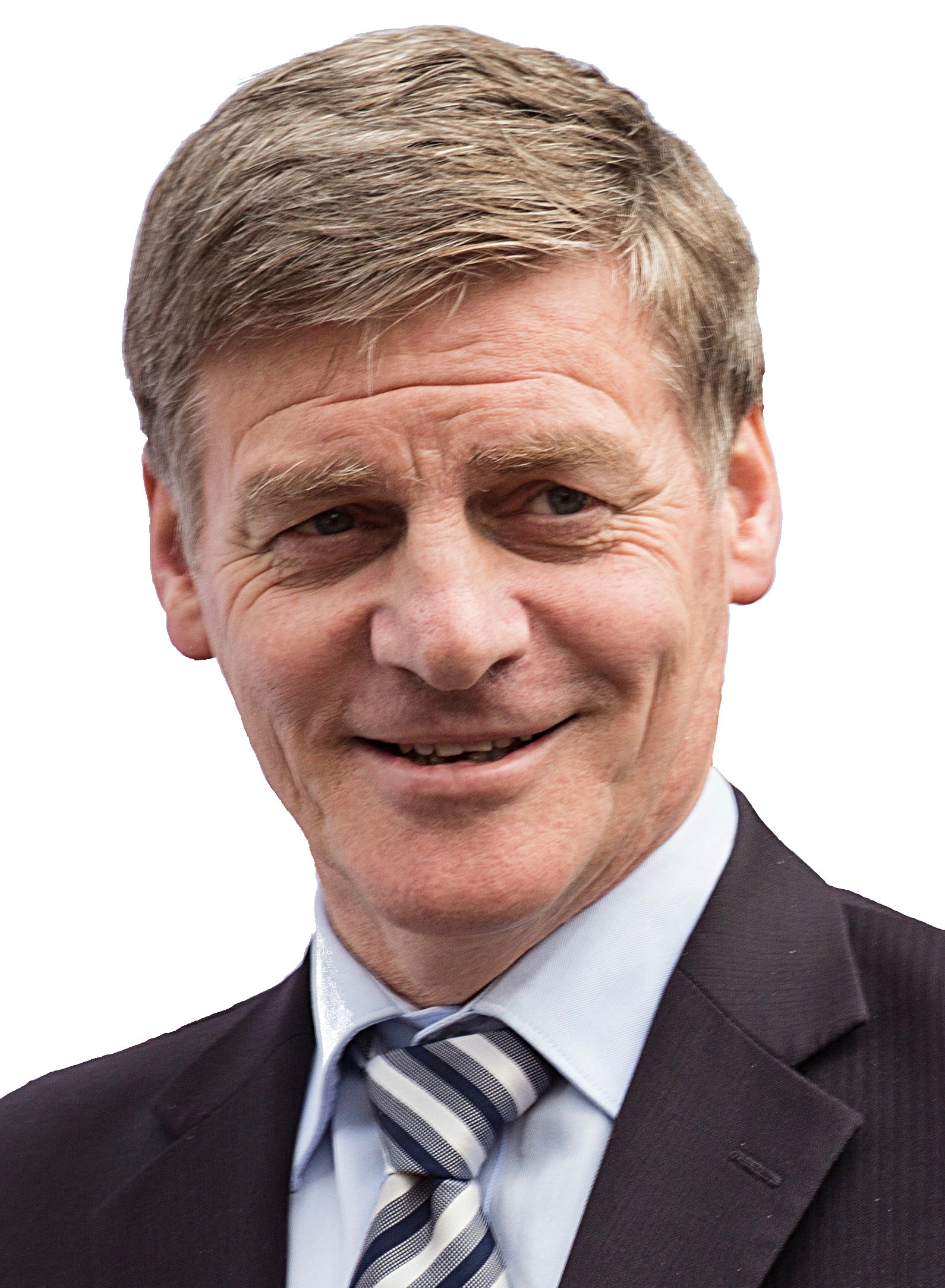
- Premiership of Bill English; 12 December 2016 – 26 October 2017
- Monarch: Elizabeth II
- Cabinet: Fifth National Government of New Zealand
- Party: New Zealand National Party
- Appointed by: Patsy Reddy

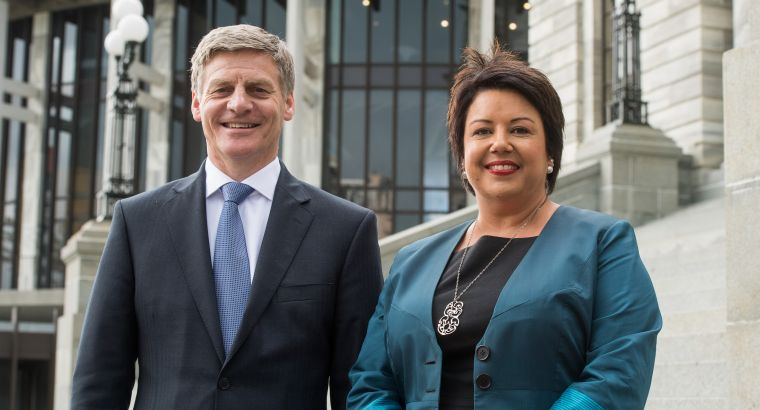
English with Deputy Prime Minister Paula Bennett on the steps of Parliament, December 2016

John Key resigned on 12 December, and endorsed English as his successor in the resulting leadership election. Following the drop-out of both Judith Collins and Jonathan Coleman from the leadership election, English was sworn in as the 39th Prime Minister of New Zealand on 12 December 2016.

English appointed his first cabinet on 18 December. In a reshuffle, he appointed Steven Joyce to succeed him as finance minister, while most ministerial portfolios remained the same.

In February 2017, English did not attend Waitangi Day commemorations at the historic treaty grounds, reportedly in response to the Ngāpuhi iwi's decision to stop the Prime Minister from speaking at the marae. Ngāpuhi have protested the Government's negotiation of the Trans Pacific Partnership Agreement (TPPA), which the iwi believe infringes upon Māori sovereignty, and thus does not adhere to the Treaty of Waitangi. English had been invited to attend in an official capacity; his non-attendance was criticised by a Ngāpuhi elder and Opposition leader Andrew Little.

In his first overseas trip as prime minister, English travelled to Europe to discuss trade ties, including a prospective New Zealand–European Union free trade agreement. He first travelled to London on 13 January 2017 to meet British prime minister Theresa May. Discussing trade relations, English said the two nations were "natural partners" and would "continue to forge ties" after the UK's withdrawal from the EU. He also arranged to meet with London Mayor Sadiq Khan, Belgian prime minister Charles Michel and German Chancellor Angela Merkel. In a meeting with Merkel, English received crucial backing from Germany for a trade deal with the EU. On 16 January, English stated that his government would continue to promote TPPA, despite the United States' decision to withdraw from the agreement. He explained that Southeast Asian countries would now be treated as a priority in negotiations—he also asserted that the United States was ceding influence to China by its rejection of the trade pact.

At a press conference at the Beehive on 1 February 2017, English announced that the 2017 general election would be held on 23 September. The Prime Minister later confirmed that his party would approach ACT, United Future and the Māori Party if confidence and supply agreements were required to form a government following the election. In his second cabinet reshuffle on 24 April, English appointed Gerry Brownlee as his new Foreign Affairs Minister; he also promoted Nikki Kaye to the portfolio of Education Minister, and moved Mark Mitchell into the cabinet to become Defence Minister. The reshuffle was perceived as an election preparation.

On 13 February 2017, English welcomed Australian prime minister Malcolm Turnbull to Wellington. The two leaders reaffirmed their shared trade agenda, and discussed changes to the Australian citizenship pathway which will affect permanent residents originating from New Zealand.

On 19 June, it was reported that Todd Barclay, who succeeded English as MP for Clutha-Southland, had clandestinely recorded one of his employee's conversations the previous year, and that John Key's leaders' budget was used to pay a confidential settlement after the employee resigned. English admitted that he had been aware of the illegal recording and the settlement, and thus implicated in the scandal.

During the 2017 National campaign launch, English introduced a $379 million social investment package including digital learning academies for high school students, more resources for mathematics, and boosting support for teaching second languages in schools, and maintaining National Standards in the school curriculum. Prime Minister English also sought to defend National's financial management and economic track record and claimed that the opposition Labour Party would raise taxes. Early opinion polling had forecast a poor showing in the election for the Labour Party, but in early August 37-year-old Jacinda Ardern took over as Labour leader and seemingly energised younger voters.

At the 2017 general election, National won the largest share of the party vote (44.4%) and the largest number of seats (56) in the House of Representatives. However, National lacked enough seats to govern alone due to two of the party's support partners, the Māori Party and United Future, losing their parliamentary seats. In response, English stated that the party would be entering into talks to form a coalition with New Zealand First. Following talks with the two largest parties, New Zealand First entered a coalition arrangement with the Labour Party. English was succeeded as prime minister by Jacinda Ardern on 26 October.

== Opposition (2017–2018) ==
=== Leader of the Opposition ===
English was re-elected as National Party leader on 24 October 2017. At the time of his re-election, English announced his intention to stay on as leader until the next general election. On 13 February 2018, however, he stood down as National Party leader for personal reasons, and instructed the party to put into motion the processes to elect a new leader. He also retired from Parliament. English's resignation followed weeks of speculation that he would step aside for a new leader. On 27 February, he was succeeded as party leader by Simon Bridges as the result of the leadership election held that day.

== Post-prime ministerial career ==
In 2018, English joined the board of Australian conglomerate, Wesfarmers. English serves in Chairmanships of Mount Cook Alpine Salmon, Impact Lab Ltd and Manawanui Support Ltd. He is also a director of The Instillery, Centre for Independent Studies and The Todd Corporation Limited, and is a member of the Impact Advisory Group of Macquarie Infrastructure and Real Assets.

In mid December 2023, the National-led coalition government appointed English to lead an independent review into housing agency Kāinga Ora's financial situation, procurement, and asset management. On 20 May 2024, English's review found that Kāinga Ora exploited its easy access to Government credit and excessively borrowed without exercising fiscal discipline.

== Political and social views ==
English is regarded as more socially conservative than his predecessor, John Key. He has stated his opposition to voluntary euthanasia and physician-assisted suicide, same-sex civil unions, and the decriminalisation of prostitution. As prime minister he opposed any "liberalisation" of abortion law.

In 2004, English voted against a bill to establish civil unions for both same-sex and opposite-sex couples. In 2005, he voted for the Marriage (Gender Clarification) Amendment Bill, which would have amended the Marriage Act to define marriage as only between a man and a woman. English voted against the Marriage (Definition of Marriage) Amendment Bill, a bill that legalised same-sex marriage in New Zealand. However, in December 2016 he stated, "I'd probably vote differently now on the gay marriage issue. I don't think that gay marriage is a threat to anyone else's marriage".

In 2009, English voted against the Misuse of Drugs (Medicinal Cannabis) Amendment Bill, a bill aimed at amending the Misuse of Drugs Act so that cannabis could be used for medical purposes.

== Personal life ==
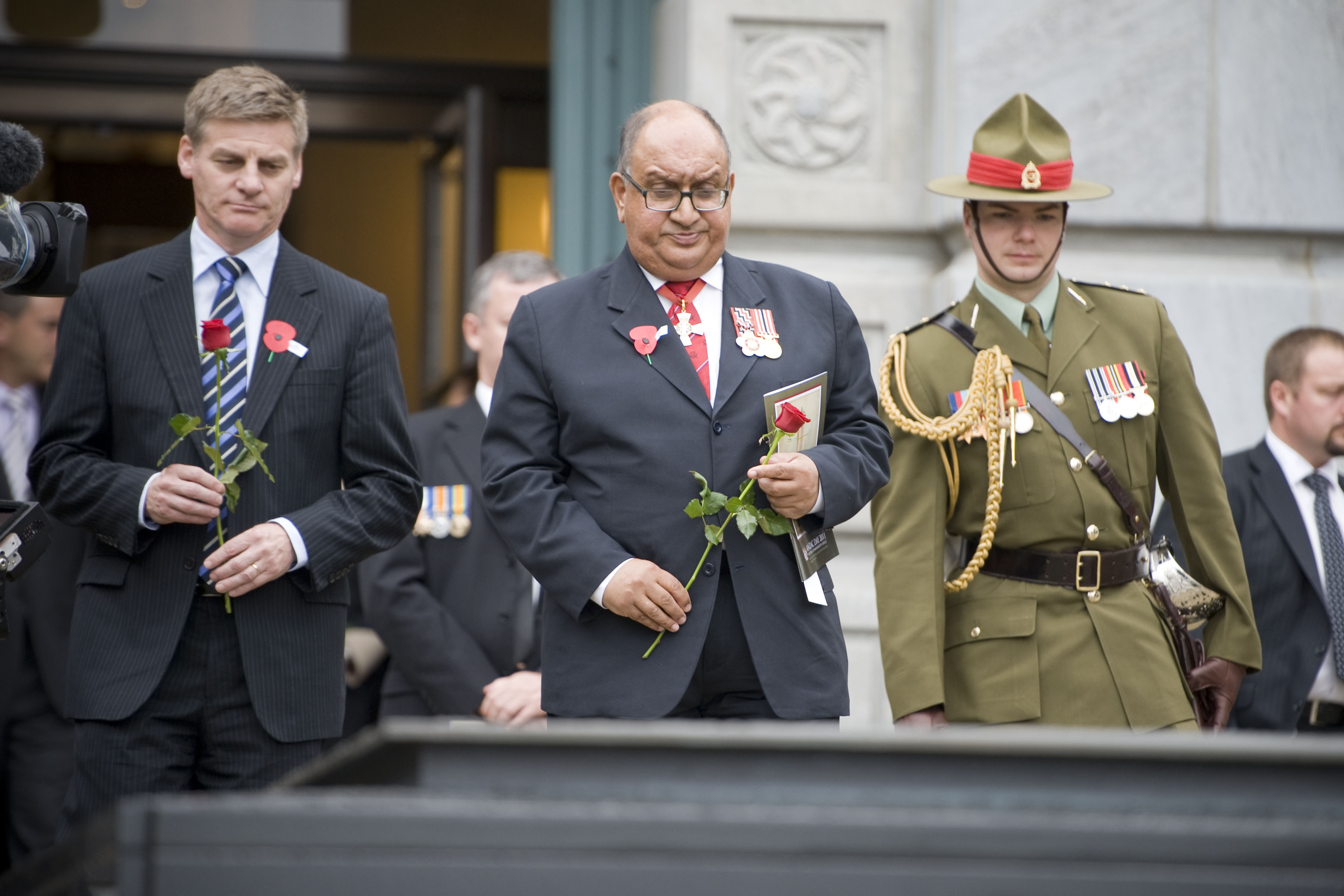
English (left) at a 2011 Anzac Day service in Wellington, alongside then-Governor-General Sir Anand Satyanand (centre)

English met his future wife, Mary Scanlon, at university. She was studying medicine at the time, and became a general practitioner. Both her parents were immigrants, her father being Samoan and her mother Italian, born on the island of Stromboli. They have six children: a daughter and five sons.

English is a practising Roman Catholic, but has stated that he considers his religious beliefs personal and thus separate from politics.

In June 2002, English took part in TV3's Fight For Life, a celebrity boxing fundraiser to raise money for the Yellow Ribbon anti-youth-suicide campaign, influenced by the death of a teenage nephew in 1997. He lost a split decision to former university colleague Ted Clarke.

== Honours ==
During a 2017 visit to Samoa marking 55 years of independence, English was bestowed with the mātai, or Samoan chiefly title, of Leulua'iali'iotumua by the village of Faleula, the home village of his wife Mary. It is considered an 'igoa ali'i', one of Faleula's highest titles.

In the 2018 Queen's Birthday Honours, English was appointed a Knight Companion of the New Zealand Order of Merit, for services of over 27 years to the State.

== See also ==
- List of New Zealand governments
- Politics of New Zealand

New Zealand Parliament
Preceded by Derek Angus	Member of Parliament for Wallace; 1990–1996	Constituency abolished
New constituency	Member of Parliament for Clutha-Southland; 1996–2014	Succeeded by Todd Barclay
Political offices
Preceded by Jenny Shipley	Minister of Health; 1996–1999	Succeeded by Wyatt Creech
Preceded by Bill Birch	Minister of Finance; 1999	Succeeded by Bill Birch
Preceded by Bill Birch	Treasurer of New Zealand; 1999	Succeeded by Michael Cullen
Preceded by Jenny Shipley	Leader of the Opposition; 2001–2003	Succeeded by Don Brash
Preceded by Michael Cullen	Deputy Prime Minister of New Zealand; 2008–2016	Succeeded by Paula Bennett
Preceded by Michael Cullen	Minister of Finance; 2008–2016	Succeeded by Steven Joyce
New office	Minister of Infrastructure; 2008–2011	Position abolished
New office	Minister for the Housing New Zealand Corporation; 2014–2016	Succeeded by Amy Adams
Preceded by John Key	Prime Minister of New Zealand; 2016–2017	Succeeded by Jacinda Ardern
Preceded by John Key	Minister of National Security and Intelligence; 2016–2017	Succeeded by Jacinda Ardern
Preceded by Jacinda Ardern	Leader of the Opposition; 2017–2018	Succeeded by Simon Bridges
Party political offices
Preceded by Wyatt Creech	Deputy Leader of the National Party; 2001	Succeeded by Roger Sowry
Preceded by Jenny Shipley	Leader of the National Party; 2001–2003	Succeeded by Don Brash
Preceded by Gerry Brownlee	Deputy Leader of the National Party; 2006–2016	Succeeded by Paula Bennett
Preceded by John Key	Leader of the National Party; 2016–2018	Succeeded by Simon Bridges
Honorary titles
Preceded by Peter Dunne	Father of the House; 2017–2018	Succeeded by Nick Smith
