= Sarah Pallett =

New Zealand politician

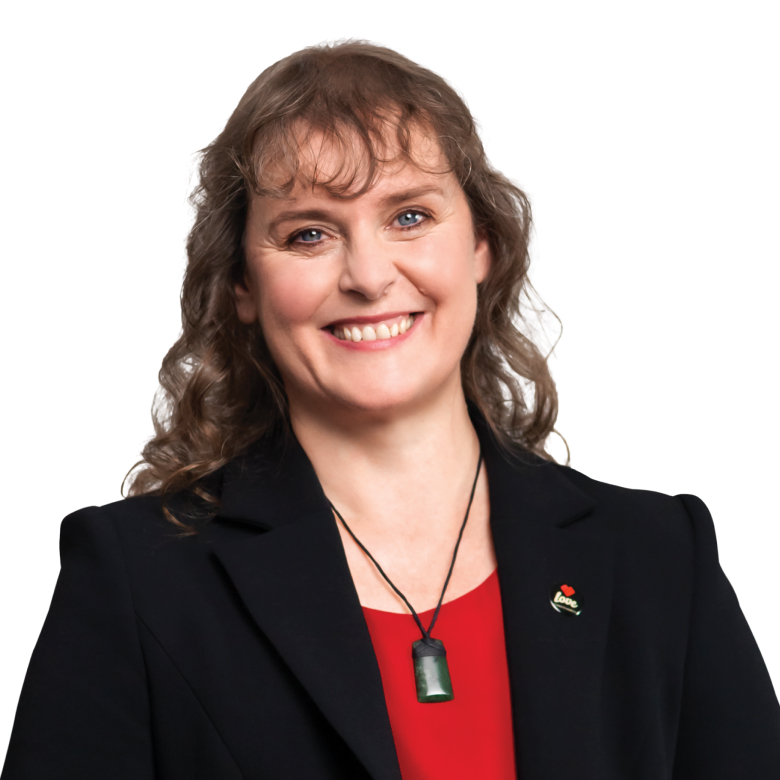
- Pallett in 2023

Member of the New Zealand Parliament for Ilam
- In office 17 October 2020 – 14 October 2023
- Preceded by: Gerry Brownlee
- Succeeded by: Hamish Campbell

Personal details
- Born: Jersey, Channel Islands
- Party: Labour
- Children: 2
- Profession: Midwife

Sarah Jean Pallett is a New Zealand midwife and politician who was the Member of Parliament for Ilam in the House of Representatives for the Labour Party from 2020 to 2023.

== Early life and career ==
Pallett was born in Jersey, Channel Islands, and spent her early years in the United Kingdom. Her mother died of breast cancer when Pallett was 21. She moved to New Zealand with her husband and two daughters, and later divorced. She was a midwife for 10 years, working as a rural midwife and then at Christchurch Women's Hospital. She became a midwifery lecturer at Ara Institute of Canterbury, and served as president of the majority union of academic staff at Ara.

== Political career ==
New Zealand Parliament
Years	Term	Electorate	List	Party
2020–2023	53rd	Ilam	62	Labour

Pallett founded and later chaired the Canterbury Women's Branch of the Labour Party.

In the 2020 election, Pallett won the seat of Ilam by a margin of 3,463 votes, ousting incumbent National Party Member of Parliament Gerry Brownlee. Dominic Harris of news website Stuff called it "perhaps the most unlikely of election night coups" which resulted in Labour taking every seat in Christchurch.

Pallett voted for cannabis reform in the 2020 New Zealand cannabis referendum and for the End of Life Choice Act 2019 to come into force in the 2020 New Zealand euthanasia referendum. Pallett said after her election that she felt it was “really time to move forward” on cannabis leglisation and that the law disproportionately affected Māori and Pasifika. In 2021 she expressed support for a student-led campaign for discounted bus fares in Canterbury.

Pallett was a member of the Health Select Committee and deputy chairperson of the Petitions Select Committee.

In the 2023 New Zealand general election, Pallett was unseated by National Party candidate Hamish Campbell. With 9,010 votes, she came third place behind Campbell and The Opportunities Party leader Raf Manji.

== Personal life ==
Pallett was diagnosed with breast cancer at the age of 36, but being diagnosed early, she survived it, saying she is "one of the lucky ones". Pallett lives in Ilam with her husband Andy, whom she married on 9 July 2021 at Parliament in Wellington. Her son-in-law, Matthew Grace, was her campaign manager.

New Zealand Parliament
Preceded by Gerry Brownlee	Member of Parliament for Ilam; 2020–2023	Succeeded by Hamish Campbell
