= Gerry Brownlee =

New Zealand politician (born 1956)

The Right Honourable Gerry Brownlee
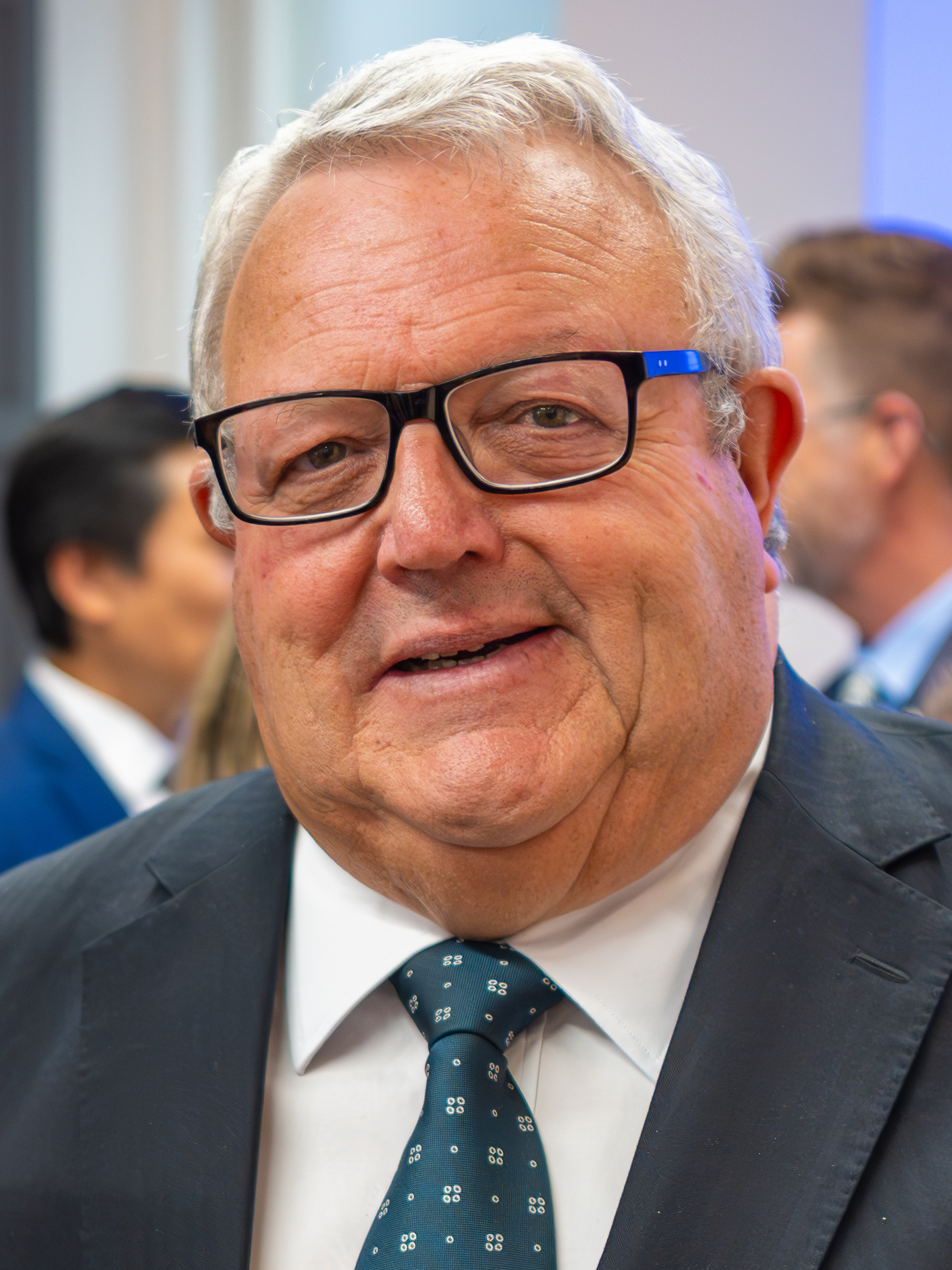
- Brownlee in 2025

32nd Speaker of the New Zealand House of Representatives
- Incumbent
- Assumed office 5 December 2023
- Monarch: Charles III
- Governor-General: Cindy Kiro
- Prime Minister: Christopher Luxon
- Deputy: Barbara Kuriger
- Preceded by: Adrian Rurawhe

Deputy Leader of the National Party
- In office 14 July 2020 – 10 November 2020
- Leader: Judith Collins
- Preceded by: Nikki Kaye
- Succeeded by: Shane Reti
- In office 17 November 2003 – 27 November 2006
- Leader: Don Brash
- Preceded by: Nick Smith
- Succeeded by: Bill English

27th Minister of Foreign Affairs
- In office 2 May 2017 – 26 October 2017
- Prime Minister: Bill English
- Preceded by: Murray McCully
- Succeeded by: Winston Peters

Leader of the House
- In office 19 November 2008 – 2 May 2017
- Prime Minister: John Key; Bill English
- Preceded by: Michael Cullen
- Succeeded by: Simon Bridges

Minister supporting Greater Christchurch Regeneration
- In office 7 September 2010 – 2 May 2017
- Prime Minister: John Key; Bill English
- Preceded by: Position established
- Succeeded by: Nicky Wagner

38th Minister of Defence
- In office 6 October 2014 – 2 May 2017
- Prime Minister: John Key; Bill English
- Preceded by: Jonathan Coleman
- Succeeded by: Mark Mitchell

25th Minister of Transport
- In office 12 December 2011 – 6 October 2014
- Prime Minister: John Key
- Preceded by: Steven Joyce
- Succeeded by: Simon Bridges

13th Minister of Energy and Resources
- In office 19 November 2008 – 14 December 2011
- Prime Minister: John Key
- Preceded by: David Parker
- Succeeded by: Phil Heatley

Member of the New Zealand Parliament for National party list
- In office 17 October 2020 – 7 November 2026

Member of the New Zealand Parliament for Ilam
- In office 12 October 1996 – 17 October 2020
- Preceded by: Seat established
- Succeeded by: Sarah Pallett

Personal details
- Born: Gerard Anthony Brownlee; 4 February 1956 (age 70) Christchurch, New Zealand
- Party: National Party
- Relations: Mark Brownlee (uncle); Scott Brownlee (cousin)
- Education: St Bede's College
- Occupation: Teacher
- Committees: Privileges Committee (Deputy Chairperson)

Gerard Anthony Brownlee (born 4 February 1956) is a New Zealand politician who has served as the 32nd speaker of the New Zealand House of Representatives since 2023. He was first elected as a member of the New Zealand House of Representatives for Ilam in 1996, representing the National Party. He became a list MP in 2020.

Brownlee was a senior member of the Fifth National Government, serving as Leader of the House, Minister for Canterbury Earthquake Recovery and Minister of Foreign Affairs. He was twice deputy leader of the National Party, first from November 2003 until November 2006 and again from July until November 2020. As the longest continuously serving member of Parliament, Brownlee became Father of the House in October 2022.

== Early life and family ==
Brownlee was born in Christchurch to Leo (a sawmiller, who died in 1989) and Mary Brownlee. He is the eldest of five children. His uncle, Mark Brownlee, represented New Zealand in rowing at the Summer Olympic Games in 1964 and 1968, and his cousin Scott Brownlee (Mark's son), represented New Zealand in rowing at the Olympics in 1992, 1996, and 2000.

A Roman Catholic, he attended St Bede's College where he twice failed to gain University Entrance. After leaving high school, he worked in his family's timber business and received training in carpentry. After qualifying as a builder, he retrained as a teacher and taught woodwork, technical drawing and Māori, over a period of twelve years, at Ellesmere College, and at his alma mater, St Bede's.

== Early political career ==
In the 1989 local elections, Brownlee stood in the Riccarton ward of Christchurch City Council for a seat on the Riccarton–Wigram community board as part of the Christchurch Action ticket formed by Margaret Murray. Of fourteen candidates, he came second and was thus declared elected as one of the three board members for Riccarton. He stood as a candidate for the Canterbury Regional Council in 1992 on the Citizens' Association ticket, but was unsuccessful.

== Member of Parliament ==
New Zealand Parliament
Years	Term	Electorate	List	Party
1996–1999	45th	Ilam	47	National
1999–2002	46th	Ilam	36	National
2002–2005	47th	Ilam	9	National
2005–2008	48th	Ilam	2	National
2008–2011	49th	Ilam	3	National
2011–2014	50th	Ilam	4	National
2014–2017	51st	Ilam	4	National
2017–2020	52nd	Ilam	5	National
2020–2023	53rd	List	2	National
2023–2026	54th	List	14	National

Brownlee first stood for National in the 1993 election, unsuccessfully contesting Sydenham against Jim Anderton, the Alliance leader. In the 1996 election he contested the nearby seat of Ilam, a longstanding conservative bastion, and won by a comfortable margin. He remained the MP for Ilam until losing his seat in the 2020 election. Before that his closest brush with defeat occurred in the 2002 election wherein he had a majority of 3,872 votes – 11.52%. Brownlee stood as a list-only candidate in 2023, fuelling speculation he would be National's candidate for speaker should it win the election.

As a junior government MP from 1997 to 1999, Brownlee was a member of the education and science committee and the internal affairs and local government committee, and deputy chair of the social services committee. He chaired the Accident Insurance Bill committee in 1998. When National went into opposition in 1999, was appointed the party's new junior whip and spokesperson for ACC. From 1999 to 2001, he was on the transport and industrial relations committee; in 2001, promoted to education spokesperson, he was on the education and science committee.

Brownlee has held senior roles within the National Party since October 2001, when the new National leader Bill English appointed him shadow leader of the House, a position he continued to hold under subsequent leaders Don Brash and John Key. Brownlee was the Leader of the House and a senior minister in the Fifth National Government, including Minister of Foreign Affairs. He returned to the shadow House leadership from 2018 to 2020. He was also deputy leader to Brash from 2003 to 2006 and to Judith Collins in 2020.

Brownlee became Father of the House in October 2022, having the longest uninterrupted membership of the House of Representatives. On 24 November 2023, prime minister-designate Christopher Luxon announced that Brownlee would be nominated to be Speaker of the House.

== Opposition, 1999–2008 ==
Brownlee received criticism during the 1999 election campaign when he ejected Neil Abel, a 60-year-old Native Forest Action campaigner, from the National Party's 1999 election campaign launch. The ejection took place with what many, including watching journalists, considered excessive force. Neil Abel started civil assault proceedings against Brownlee, seeking damages of $60,000. In 2002, a District Court judge found in favour of Abel that Brownlee had "used excessive and unnecessary force on Abel when he tried to remove him from a staircase handrail". Brownlee was ordered to pay Abel $8,500 in damages. Brownlee later sought unsuccessfully to have $48,000 of his legal fees reimbursed by the Government.

Brownlee challenged the vacant deputy leadership of the National Party in 2001, but was defeated by Bill English. English eventually succeeded to the leadership later that year. In the English shadow cabinet, Brownlee was spokesperson for local government and energy, as well as shadow Leader of the House. By 2003, Brownlee was seen by Labour Party MP Phil Goff and Scoop columnist Paulo Politico as a potential challenger to English's leadership. English was eventually replaced as National Party leader by former Reserve Bank Governor Don Brash. Brownlee was thought to be a possible deputy leader to Brash but declined to pursue the position, which went to Nick Smith.

Shortly after his election, however, Smith opted to take two weeks of stress leave, saying that the protracted leadership disputes had exhausted him. When Smith returned to Parliament, Brownlee challenged him for the deputy leadership. Informed of the challenge, Smith resigned, and on 17 November 2003 Brownlee won the caucus vote unopposed. Initially, Smith alleged that while he was on stress leave, "a campaign to oust me was conducted in the media while I was under the leader's instructions to make no comment." Audrey Young wrote in the New Zealand Herald that Brownlee and Murray McCully were rumoured to have been behind the campaign to oust Smith as deputy leader.

After becoming a deputy leader, Brownlee continued his confrontational and colourful style of political debate. Following the controversy surrounding Brash's Orewa Speech of 27 January 2004, Brownlee became the National Party's spokesman for Maori Affairs in place of Georgina te Heuheu, who resigned from the position after refusing to endorse Brash's comments. Brownlee's approach to this portfolio involved criticising the government's policies regarding perceived special treatment for Māori, an issue at the core of National's 2005 election manifesto.

When Brash resigned as National Party Leader in November 2006, Brownlee was reported as "probably" considering a bid to remain in the deputy leadership; however, he stepped aside in place to allow former leader Bill English to take the deputy leadership and was appointed the third-ranked National Party MP by new party leader John Key.

== Fifth National Government, 2008–2017 ==
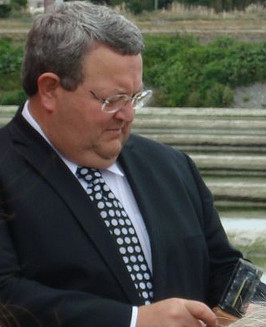
Brownlee in 2009

Following the election of the Fifth National Government in November 2008, Brownlee was appointed a member of the Executive Council of New Zealand and to Cabinet as Minister of Economic Development, Minister of Energy and Resources and as Associate Minister for the Rugby World Cup. He also became the Leader of the House. When the Canterbury earthquakes struck in 2010, Brownlee was appointed Minister for Canterbury Earthquake Recovery. In the government's second term (2011–2014), Brownlee was Minister of Transport. In its third term, he was Minister of Defence from November 2014 until May 2017, and thereafter Minister of Foreign Affairs until October 2017.

In April 2013, Brownlee was represented New Zealand in London at the funeral of former British Prime Minister Margaret Thatcher.

=== Minister of Energy and Resources ===
In August 2009, Brownlee was criticised by Forest and Bird Spokesperson Kevin Hackwell for playing down government discussions to possibly allow more mining within conservation areas. Hackwell was reported as stating that "If the Government's to go down this line they could be buying a fight with the people of the Coromandel, with the people of New Zealand generally, who have put these areas aside and want them protected for their conservation values". The New Zealand mining industry was reported as welcoming the move.

In early December 2009, Forest and Bird released a leaked document that included the proposal to remove part of the conservation status of Mount Aspiring National Park to allow mining. The result of the controversy was that the government decided not to explore considerations amongst significant debate on the issue in the House, in submissions to the Select Committees and within the National Party's own parliamentary caucus.

On the withdrawal Brownlee stated "I suspect few New Zealanders knew the country had such considerable mineral potential before we undertook this process, and I get a sense that New Zealanders are now much more aware of that potential". He went on that it might contribute to economic growth and further stated that "New Zealanders have given the minerals sector a clear mandate to go and explore that land, and where appropriate, within the constraints of the resource consent process, utilise its mineral resources for everyone's benefit". An additional announcement from Conservation Minister Kate Wilkinson pronounced that future National Park land would receive protections, stating that, "This is an added layer of protection for New Zealand's most highly valued conservation land..."

=== Minister for Canterbury Earthquake Recovery ===
As the Government's most senior Christchurch-based MP, Brownlee led the Government's work in earthquake recovery after the 2010, 2011 and 2016 earthquakes. Following National's re-election in 2011 and 2014, Brownlee additionally served as Minister of Transport, Minister of Defence, and Minister of Civil Defence. When Bill English became Prime Minister, Brownlee succeeded Murray McCully as Minister of Foreign Affairs. On 14 September 2010, Brownlee introduced the Canterbury Earthquake Response and Recovery Act 2010 into the house with leave to pass the legislation in one sitting. This Bill was passed by the time the House adjourned at 10.02 pm.

Brownlee had little sympathy for attempts to preserve heritage buildings, saying not long after the 2011 quake: "My absolutely strong position is that the old dungers, no matter what their connection, are going under the hammer." In 2012, it was reported that the idea of using part of Christchurch's residential red zone for an international rowing regatta course known as East Lake had found the support of Brownlee as Earthquake Recovery Minister. In September 2012, Brownlee accused residents in Christchurch's newly created TC3 zone of "carping and moaning" for comments they made in a survey conducted by the main local newspaper. The comments were about perceived inaction by the authorities, including the government. He apologised soon after.

=== Minister of Transport ===
In March 2012, Brownlee made controversial comments about Finland in a parliamentary session. Rejecting a New Zealand Labour Party plan to model the economy on Finland, he said Finland: "has worse unemployment than us, has less growth than us, can hardly feed the people who live there, has a terrible homicide rate, hardly educates its people, and has no respect for women." Finnish Foreign Minister Erkki Tuomioja, said that Finland would not take any action as the comments were clearly a device for internal politics rather than an attack on Finland. He continued to say: "I doubt he even knows where Finland is."

In November 2014 Brownlee was fined $2000 by New Zealand's Civil Aviation Authority for a breach of airport security that occurred at Christchurch Airport on 24 July 2014. An official inquiry found that Brownlee and two of his aides had evaded airport security screening by entering a departure lounge through an exit door while in a rush to board a domestic flight.

=== Minister of Foreign Affairs ===
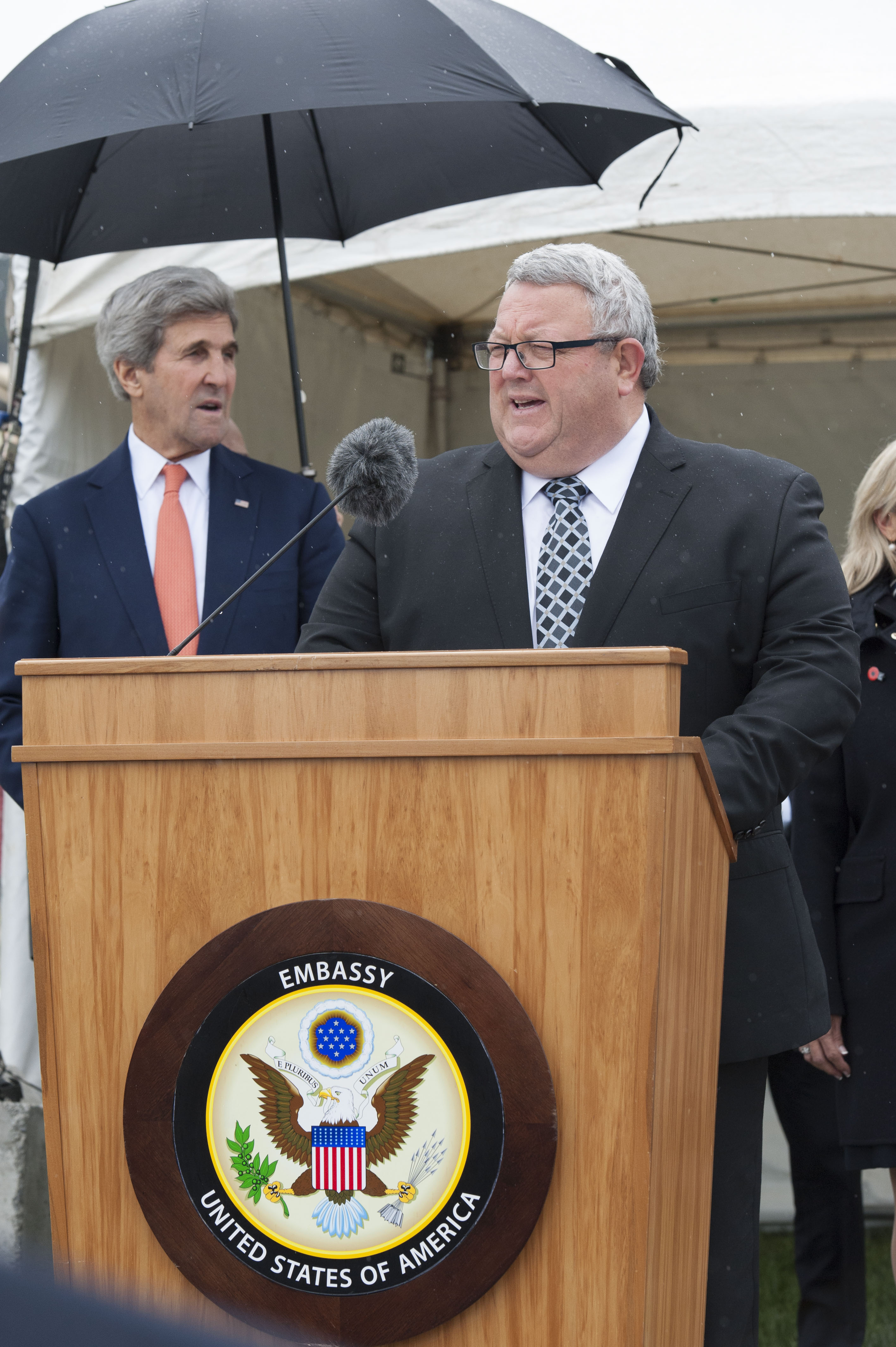
Brownlee, as Minister of Foreign Affairs, meets US Secretary of State John Kerry, 13 November 2016

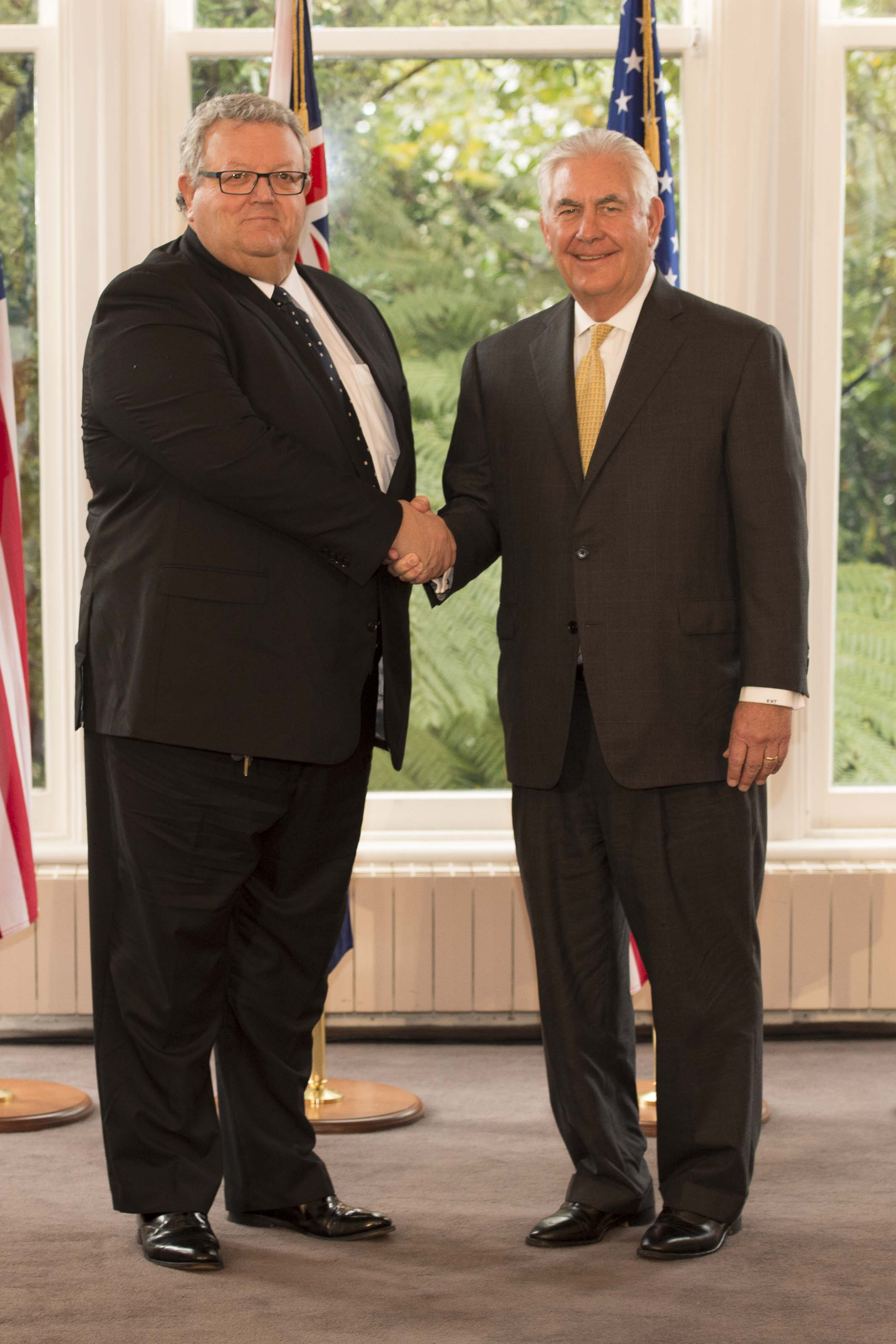
Brownlee meets US Secretary of State Rex Tillerson, 6 June 2017

In May 2017, less than a week after being appointed as Foreign Minister, Brownlee was publicly corrected by Prime Minister Bill English, after claiming that a New Zealand-sponsored United Nations Security Council Resolution on Israel (about settlements in occupied territories) was "premature". The Prime Minister said Brownlee was "still getting familiar" with the language used by his predecessor, Murray McCully, who had authorised the sponsorship of the resolution. Responding to questions in Parliament on Brownlee's behalf, Deputy Prime Minister Paula Bennett commented that Brownlee's use of the word "premature" was because the Government "would have liked to give Israel notice of the resolution, and our part in that, but did not."

English said he had confidence that Brownlee was clear on New Zealand's position now, a position that had not changed since the Government had chosen to push through the resolution. Brownlee had been a Cabinet minister at the time; however, the decision to co-sponsor the resolution (described by McCully and Bennett as being in line with New Zealand's "long-standing position") had not gone to Cabinet.

== Opposition, 2017–2023 ==
From 2018 to 2020, Brownlee served in Opposition as Shadow Leader of the House, and was the National Party Spokesperson for Disarmament, NZSIS, and GCSB. He was the deputy chairperson on the Privileges, Standing Orders, and Foreign Affairs, Defence and Trade Select Committees, as well as a member of the Business Committee and the Parliamentary Service Commission.

On 14 July 2020, Brownlee was elected by the National Party parliamentary caucus as the Deputy Leader of the National Party following a leadership election held after the resignation of Party Leader Todd Muller that same day. Judith Collins was elected as the leader of the National Party.

In August 2020, Brownlee was widely criticised during the COVID-19 pandemic for comments he made that were widely interpreted to be promoting misinformation and conspiracy theories regarding the NZ Government response to the pandemic. In particular, his comments were considered to imply that the Government was withholding information about confirmed cases, without providing any evidence that this was the case. Brownlee was also accused of attacking the integrity of independent public servants and promoting the propagation of misinformation.

During the 2020 New Zealand general election, Brownlee lost his seat of Ilam to Labour candidate Sarah Pallett by a final margin of 3,463 votes. Dominic Harris of news website Stuff described it "perhaps the most unlikely of election night coups". Despite this defeat, Brownlee returned to Parliament due to ranking second on the National Party list.

On 6 November 2020, Brownlee announced his resignation as deputy leader of National. He was succeeded by Shane Reti.

Brownlee announced on 2 August 2022 that he would seek re-election at the 2023 New Zealand general election, although would not attempt to win back Ilam, instead opting to contest as a list only candidate, indicating he may become Speaker of the House should National form a Government following the election.

In September 2022, Brownlee was criticised by Rodney Jones and Jason Young for his response to the United Nations Xinjiang Report in saying that China is "dealing with a terrorist problem" and that China’s anti-terrorism laws were comparable to New Zealand’s and those of other countries.

During the 2023 New Zealand general election, Brownlee was re-elected to Parliament as a list MP.

In early November 2023, Brownlee accompanied the caretaker Deputy Prime Minister, Carmel Sepuloni, to the 2023 Pacific Islands Forum in his capacity as National’s foreign affairs spokesperson. There, he met with several non-Pacific representatives from Cuba, Portugal, France and South Korea in Rarotonga.

== Speaker of the House, 2023–2026 ==
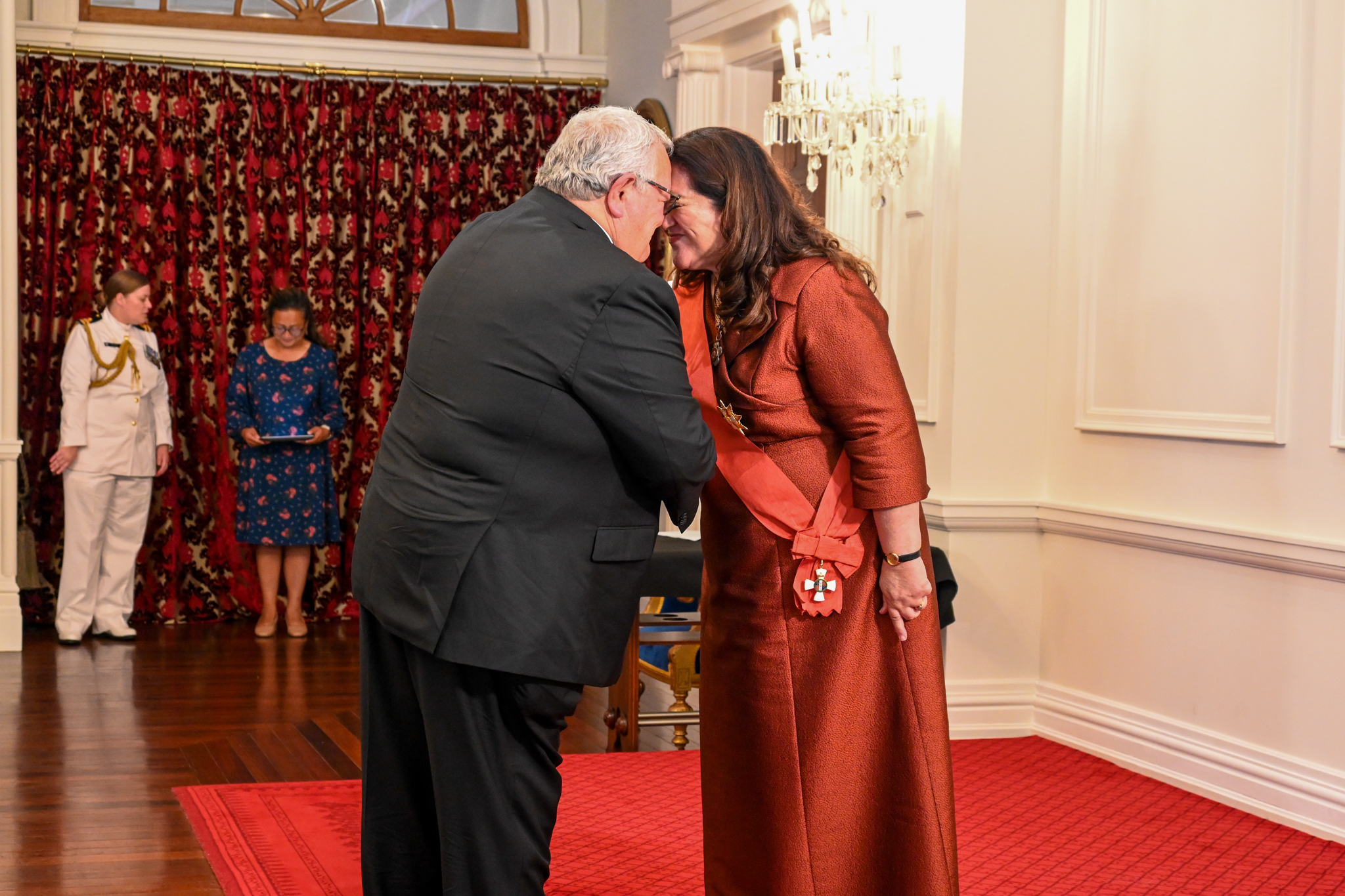
Brownlee performs a hongi with Governor-General Dame Cindy Kiro, after appointment as speaker, 5 December 2023

Brownlee was nominated as Speaker of the House of Representatives for the 54th New Zealand Parliament. He was elected unopposed, after Debbie Ngarewa-Packer nominated his predecessor Adrian Rurawhe, who declined the nomination.

In November 2024, Brownlee's initial decision to bar Newsroom journalist Aaron Smale from attending the National Apology ceremony at Parliament for survivors of abuse in state and faith-based care attracted criticism from both survivor groups and the Parliamentary Press Gallery, the latter of whom appealed the decision. Smale had previously asked Prime Minister Christopher Luxon whether there was a link between tough and crime policies and gang membership, and had also criticised Children's Minister Karen Chhour for comparing the Government's boot camp programme to the Māori battalion. On 11 November, Brownlee reversed the ban and permitted Smale access to the National Apology on the condition that he was accompanied by a fellow Newsroom journalist.

On 10 December 2024, Brownlee as Speaker disagreed with Clerk of the New Zealand House of Representatives David Wilson and Assistant Speaker Barbara Kuriger, ruling that the list of projects under the Fast-track Approvals Bill does not grant a private benefit. Earlier that day, RMA Reform Minister Chris Bishop had submitted an amendment paper with a large number of changes to the proposed legislation during the Committee of the House stage of the Fast-Track Approvals Bill. Based on the Clerk's advice, Kuriger expressed concern that the listing of projects under the Fast-Track Bill benefitted specific people and should thus be classified as private legislation and removed from the Bill. The Government disagreed and recalled Brownlee, who overruled Kuriger. Brownlee's decision was criticised by the opposition Labour and Green parties, with the former saying it had lost confidence in Brownlee's role as Speaker of the House. The Fast-Track Approvals Bill passed its third reading on 17 December 2024.

In early March 2025, Brownlee ordered Members of Parliament to stop filing complaints about the use of Aotearoa as the Māori name for New Zealand. In mid-February 2026, Brownlee ejected Shadow Leader of the House Kieran McAnulty from a House debate after the latter accused the former of showing "double standards" towards New Zealand First leader Winston Peters, who had earlier criticised Green Party MP Teanau Tuiono for referring to New Zealand as Aotearoa.

In mid-August 2025, Brownlee ordered Greens co-leader Chlöe Swarbrick to leave Parliament's debating chamber after she criticised Government MPs during a debate on the recognition of Palestine. The following day, Brownlee "named" Swarbrick and ordered her to leave the debating chamber after she refused to apologise for her earlier actions.

In early August 2026, Brownlee ordered Swarbrick to leave the debating chamber after she accused him of favouring New Zealand First leader Winston Peters over opposition Members of Parliament during a Question Time debate. Swarbrick and her Green Party colleagues had also earlier condemned Peters for telling Green MP Lawrence Xu-Nan to "go back to his own country" during a parliamentary debate in late July 2026. On 15 September 2026, Brownlee ordered Labour MP Ginny Andersen and ACT leader David Seymour to leave the debating chamber for heckling National MP Carl Bates and arguing with the Speaker during question time respectively.

During the 2026 New Zealand general election, Brownlee was ranked ninth on the National Party list. He opted to stand as a list-only candidate. Based on preliminary results, Brownlee and several other National list-only MPs and including Nicola Willis, Chris Bishop and Paul Goldsmith did not make it back into Parliament.

== Political views ==
Brownlee has generally voted conservatively on conscience issues.

In April 2013, Brownlee voted against the Marriage (Definition of Marriage) Amendment Bill, a bill allowing same-sex couples to marry in New Zealand.

He voted against the Abortion Legislation Bill in 2019 and 2020 and against the End of Life Choice Bill in 2017 and 2019.

== See also ==
- List of foreign ministers in 2017

New Zealand Parliament
New constituency	Member of Parliament for Ilam; 1996–2020	Succeeded by Sarah Pallett
Preceded by Adrian Rurawhe	Speaker of the House of Representatives; 2023–present	Incumbent
Party political offices
Preceded by Nick Smith	Deputy Leader of the National Party; 2003–2006; 2020	Succeeded by Bill English
Preceded by Nikki Kaye	Deputy Leader of the National Party; 2003–2006; 2020	Succeeded by Shane Reti
Political offices
Preceded by Pete Hodgson	Minister for Economic Development; 2008–2011	Succeeded by Steven Joyce
Preceded by David Parker	Minister of Energy and Resources; 2008–2011	Succeeded by Phil Heatley
Preceded by Steven Joyce	Minister of Transport; 2011–2014	Succeeded by Simon Bridges
Preceded by Michael Cullen	Leader of the House; 2008–2017	Succeeded by Simon Bridges
Preceded by Murray McCully	Minister of Foreign Affairs; 2017	Succeeded by Winston Peters
New title	Minister for Canterbury Earthquake Recovery; 2010–2016	Post abolished
New title	Minister for EQC; 2011–2017	Succeeded by Megan Woods
Preceded by Nikki Kaye	Minister of Civil Defence; 2016	Succeeded by Nathan Guy
Preceded by Nikki Kaye	Deputy Leader of the Opposition; 2020	Succeeded by Shane Reti
Honorary titles
Preceded by Trevor Mallard	Father of the House; 2022–present	Incumbent
