= 2009 New Zealand budget =

- Submitted by: Bill English
- Parliament: Parliament of New Zealand
- Party: National
- Total revenue: ▼$58.8 billion
- Total expenditures: ▲$62.3 billion
- Deficit: ▼ -$2.9 billion
- Debt: ▼$15.4 billion (Net) ▼8.7% (Net debt to GDP)
- ^{ǂ}Numbers in italics are projections.

The New Zealand budget for fiscal year 2009-2010 was presented to the New Zealand House of Representatives by Finance Minister Bill English on 28 May 2009.

This was the first budget Bill English has presented as Minister of Finance.

== Outline ==
The fifth National Government's first Budget was delivered with the New Zealand economy in recession from the last quarter of 2007, and the effects of the 2008 financial crisis and rising national debt.

The 2009 Budget included new spending of $5.8 billion to "help maintain economic activity and to support jobs". New spending included a home insulation and clean heating campaign, infrastructure investment and a national cycleway network.

The Budget confirmed 2009 tax cuts but deferred the second and third tranches of planned tax cuts in 2010 and 2011 as "unaffordable". Automatic contributions to the New Zealand Super Fund were suspended. $2 billion of planned spending by the previous Government's was reprioritised.

Budget 2009 forecast gross debt to peak at 43% of GDP in 2016/17.
