= 2003 New Zealand National Party leadership election =

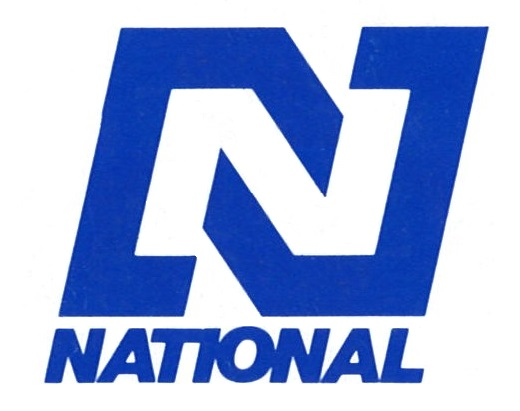
- 28 October 2003
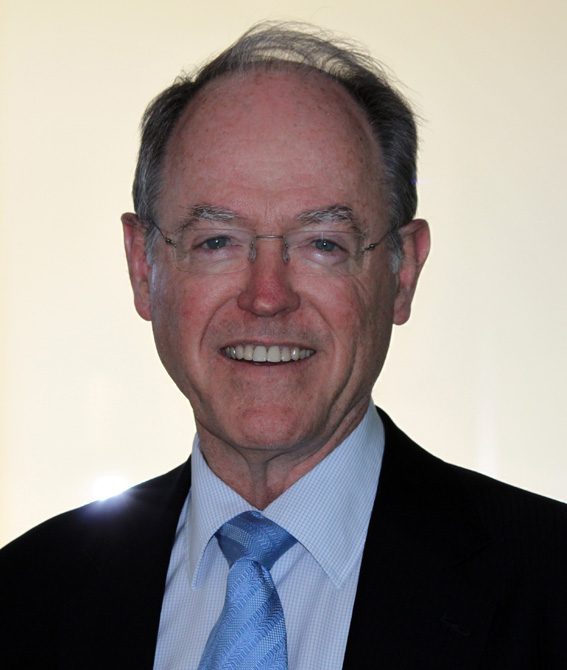

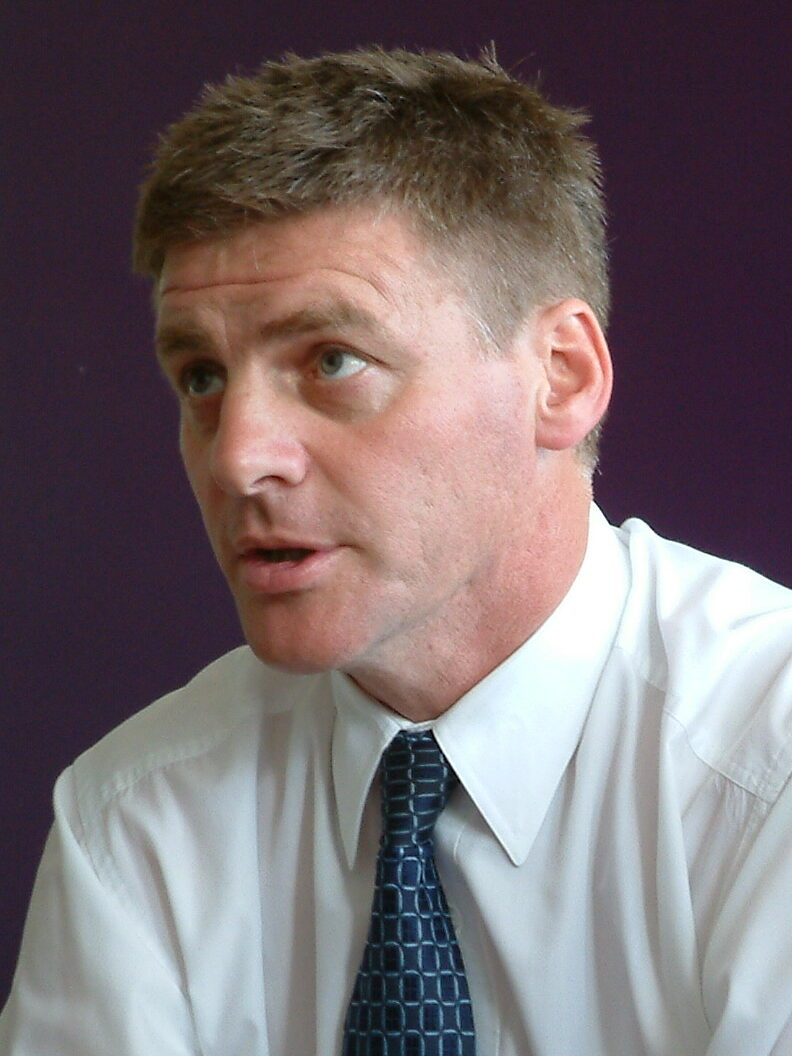
Candidate	Don Brash	Bill English
Popular vote	14	12
Percentage	53.84%	46.16%
Leader before election
Bill English
Leader after election
Don Brash

The New Zealand National Party leadership election was an election for the National Party leadership position held in 2003.

== Background ==
Aged 39 when he was elected, English became the second-youngest leader in the National Party's history, after Jim McLay (who was 38 when elected in 1984). He also became only the third Southlander to lead a major New Zealand political party, after Joseph Ward and Adam Hamilton. However, English failed to improve the party's performance. In the 2002 elections, National suffered its worst electoral defeat ever, gaining barely more than twenty percent of the vote. English described it as "the worst day of my political life". Both party insiders and the general public were split as to how much to blame him for the loss, but most of the party believed that English would be able to rebuild National's support.

By late 2003, however, National's performance in opinion polls remained poor. The party had briefly increased its popularity in the year following the election, but by October its support had fallen to levels only slightly better than what it achieved in the last ballot. English also appeared in a boxing match for a charity against entertainer Ted Clarke. This "stunt" did not boost his polling or that of the National party either, with suggestions that it devalued his image as a serious politician. Don Brash, former governor of the Reserve Bank and a relative newcomer to politics, began to build up support to replace English. On 28 October, Brash gained sufficient backing in Caucus to replace English as leader.

== Result ==
Brash defeated English in a caucus ballot lost by a two-vote margin. Afterwards a "key player" told media "He [English] was stabbed in the front not the back".

=== Leadership ballot ===
Name	Votes	Percentage
Don Brash	14	53.84
Bill English	12	46.16
