= Second Shadow Cabinet of Bill English =

New Zealand shadow cabinet (2017–2018)

The second Shadow Cabinet of Bill English formed the official Opposition in the 52nd New Zealand Parliament from 2 November 2017 until 11 March 2018, during Bill English's second term as Leader of the Opposition.

The Shadow Cabinet was formed after the 2017 New Zealand general election, when a new Government was formed by the New Zealand Labour Party, New Zealand First party and Green Party of Aotearoa New Zealand. As the largest party not in government, the New Zealand National Party became the official opposition. National Party leader Bill English assigned spokesperson roles to his MPs in order to scrutinise the policies and actions of the government, as well to offer an alternative program. As many National MPs were Ministers in the previous National-led Government, many of them were named Spokespersons for areas in which they had previously had ministerial responsibility. Most other MPs picked up minor portfolios, although new MPs were not assigned any particular responsibilities.

In early 2018, English resigned from the leadership and was replaced as National Party leader by Simon Bridges on 27 February 2018. Other than Bridges' succession to the leadership, no changes to portfolio responsibilities were named until 11 March 2018, when Bridges announced his own Shadow Cabinet.

== List of spokespersons ==
The Opposition portfolio spokespersons were as follows:

Rank	Spokesperson	Portfolio
1	Rt Hon Bill English	Leader of the Opposition; Spokesperson for National Security and Intelligence
2	Hon Paula Bennett	Deputy Leader of the Opposition; Spokesperson for Children; Spokesperson for Women; Spokesperson for Social Investment
3	Hon Steven Joyce	Spokesperson for Finance; Spokesperson for Infrastructure
4	Hon Gerry Brownlee	Spokesperson for Foreign Affairs; Spokesperson for Fisheries; Spokesperson for Land Information
5	Hon Simon Bridges	Shadow Leader of the House; Spokesperson for Economic and Regional Development; Spokesperson for Immigration
6	Hon Amy Adams	Spokesperson for Justice; Spokesperson for Workplace Relations and Safety (including Pike River)
7	Hon Dr Jonathan Coleman	Spokesperson for Health; Spokesperson for Sport and Recreation
8	Hon Chris Finlayson	Shadow Attorney General; Spokesperson for Commerce; Spokesperson for Government Communications Security Bureau; Spokesperson for New Zealand Security and Intelligence Service
9	Hon Judith Collins	Spokesperson for Transport; Spokesperson for Revenue
10	Hon Michael Woodhouse	Spokesperson for Housing; Spokesperson for Social Housing
11	Hon Nathan Guy	Spokesperson for Primary Industries
12	Hon Nikki Kaye	Spokesperson for Education
13	Hon Todd McClay	Spokesperson for Trade; Spokesperson for State Services
14	Hon Paul Goldsmith	Spokesperson for Tertiary Education, Skills and Employment; Spokesperson for Arts, Culture and Heritage
15	Hon Louise Upston	Spokesperson for Social Development
16	Hon Anne Tolley	Deputy Speaker
17	Rt Hon David Carter	Spokesperson for State Owned Enterprises
18	Hon Dr Nick Smith	Spokesperson for Forestry; Spokesperson for Aquaculture
19	Hon Maggie Barry	Spokesperson for Conservation
20	Hon Alfred Ngaro	Spokesperson for Courts; Spokesperson for the Community and Voluntary Sector; Spokesperson for Pacific Peoples
21	Hon Mark Mitchell	Spokesperson for Defence
22	Hon Nicky Wagner	Spokesperson for Disability Issues
23	Hon Jacqui Dean	Spokesperson for Tourism; Spokesperson for Small Business
24	Hon David Bennett	Spokesperson for Food Safety; Spokesperson for Racing; Associate Spokesperson for Immigration
25	Hon Tim Macindoe	Spokesperson for ACC
26	Hon Scott Simpson	Spokesperson for the Environment; Spokesperson for Planning
27	Jami-Lee Ross	Senior Whip; Spokesperson for Local Government; Associate spokesperson for Transport
28	Barbara Kuriger	Junior Whip; Spokesperson for Biosecurity; Spokesperson for Rural Communities
29	Matt Doocey	Third Whip; Spokesperson for Greater Christchurch Regeneration; Spokesperson for Mental Health
30	Kanwaljit Singh Bakshi	Spokesperson for Internal Affairs; Associate spokesperson for Police
31	Melissa Lee	Spokesperson for Broadcasting, Communications and Digital Media; Spokesperson for Ethnic Affairs
32	Jonathan Young	Spokesperson for Energy and Resources
33	Jo Hayes	Spokesperson for Whānau Ora; Associate spokesperson for Children
34	Ian McKelvie	Spokesperson for Seniors; Spokesperson for Veterans
35	Simon O'Connor	Spokesperson for Corrections
36	Dr Jian Yang	Spokesperson for Statistics; Associate Spokesperson for Ethnic Affairs
37	Andrew Bayly	Spokesperson for Building Regulation; Associate Spokesperson for Commerce
38	Chris Bishop	Spokesperson for Police; Spokesperson for Youth
39	Sarah Dowie	Spokesperson for Early Childhood Education
40	Brett Hudson	Spokesperson for ICT; Spokesperson for Government Digital Services
41	Nuk Korako	Spokesperson for Treaty of Waitangi Negotiations; Spokesperson for Māori Development
42	Todd Muller	Spokesperson for Climate Change; Spokesperson for Crown/Māori Relations
43	Dr Parmjeet Parmar	Spokesperson for Science and Innovation
44	Dr Shane Reti	Spokesperson for Data; Associate spokesperson for Health
45	Alastair Scott	Spokesperson for Customs; Associate Spokesperson for Regional Development
46	Stuart Smith	Spokesperson for Civil Defence; Spokesperson for the Earthquake Commission

The ten MPs who entered Parliament at the 2017 general election (Simeon Brown, Andrew Falloon, Harete Hipango, Matt King, Denise Lee, Chris Penk, Erica Stanford, Tim van de Molen, Hamish Walker, and Lawrence Yule) were not ranked or given portfolio allocations.
