= Shadow Cabinet of Simon Bridges =

New Zealand shadow cabinet (2018–2020)

- Shadow Cabinet of New Zealand
- 27 February 2018 – 22 May 2020
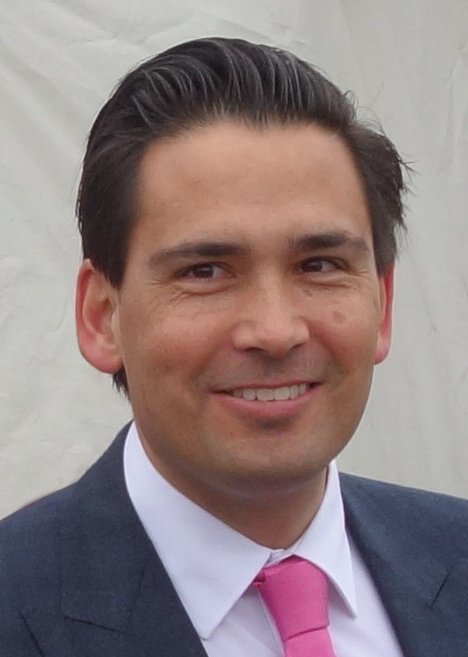
- Date formed: 27 February 2018
- Date dissolved: 22 May 2020

People and organisations
- Monarch: Elizabeth II
- Leader of the Opposition: Simon Bridges
- Deputy Leader of the New Zealand National Party and Deputy Leader of the Opposition: Paula Bennett
- Member party: New Zealand National Party
- Status in legislature: Official Opposition

History
- Elections: 27 February 2018; 22 May 2020
- Legislature term: 52nd New Zealand Parliament
- Predecessor: Second Shadow Cabinet of Bill English
- Successor: Shadow Cabinet of Todd Muller

The Shadow Cabinet of Simon Bridges was the official Opposition in the 52nd New Zealand Parliament between 11 March 2018 and 22 May 2020. It comprised all members of the New Zealand National Party, which was the largest party not a member of the Government.

Simon Bridges was elected Leader of the National Party and Leader of the Opposition on 27 February 2020 and announced his first shadow cabinet two weeks later. The portfolio allocations were amended six times during the term as a number of National members of Parliament either resigned or announced their intention not to contest the 2020 general election.

Following Bridges' defeat by Todd Muller in the May 2020 National Party leadership election and the formation of Muller's shadow Cabinet, the Bridges shadow Cabinet ceased to exist.

== Formation ==
Bridges followed his predecessor Bill English's lead by naming each of National's 56 members of Parliament to at least one spokesperson or associate spokesperson role. Like English, Bridges took no portfolios other than national security and intelligence, which is traditionally held by the Leader of the Opposition. His deputy, Paula Bennett, was given responsibility for social investment and social services; tertiary education, skills and employment; and women.

Commentators noticed that the initial portfolio allocations and caucus rankings rewarded Bridges' rivals for the leadership. Former justice minister Amy Adams, who had placed second in the leadership election, was named finance spokesperson and was ranked third. Judith Collins, who finished third, was placed at fourth rank, and received the housing portfolio, which she had asked for. Previous aspirants to the leadership, Jonathan Coleman and Mark Mitchell were also ranked highly, in sixth and seventh position respectively. Bridges' allies Todd McClay and Jami-Lee Ross were placed fifth and eighth respectively. Ross was the highest-ranked National MP who did not serve as a minister in the previous National-led government. The front bench was completed economic and regional development spokesperson Paul Goldsmith and education spokesperson Nikki Kaye. Melissa Lee and Sarah Dowie were the other two non-ministers to gain promotion to the top twenty.

Bridges had promised "generational change" on his ascension to the leadership. The front bench line up in particular was praised for including a high proportion of women MPs. Bridges and Bennett were, notably, the first National leadership team both to be of Māori descent. Bridges also placed several former ministers in lower positions than they had held in the English shadow Cabinet. Former senior minister Gerry Brownlee lost the foreign affairs portfolio to McClay, while former finance minister Steven Joyce resigned from Parliament when he was not offered the finance portfolio. Former conservation minister Maggie Barry (who had openly supported Amy Adams' leadership bid) and customs minister Nicky Wagner were also demoted. The twelve new MPs elected in the 2017 general election were listed last, alphabetically by surname. Whānau Ora spokesperson Jo Hayes was the lowest ranked returning MP.

=== Amendments ===
Portfolio allocations were amended six times throughout Bridges' tenure as leader to accommodate the departures or planned retirements of members. The first change was made two weeks after the formation of the shadow Cabinet, on 26 March, with the resignation of Jonathan Coleman. Coleman had been the spokesperson for health and sport and recreation, portfolios he had held ministerial warrants for in the previous government. Michael Woodhouse, a former hospital chief executive, gained health. Education spokesperson Nikki Kaye picked up sport and recreation. Woodhouse's portfolio of workplace relations and safety was added to the responsibilities of environment spokesperson Scott Simpson.

In October 2018, a series of events that involved the leaking of Bridges' travel expenses saw transport and infrastructure spokesperson Jami-Lee Ross stand down from his portfolios while undertaking personal leave before resigning from the National Party. Judith Collins and Paul Goldsmith picked up Ross's portfolios. The third resignation, in January 2019, was of former Attorney-General Chris Finlayson. His shadow Attorney-General portfolio went to Amy Adams and a new drug reform portfolio, responding to the Government's decision to hold a referendum on legalising the sale, use, possession and production of cannabis in 2020, was assigned to Paula Bennett.

In June 2019, finance spokesperson Amy Adams and Wairarapa MP Alastair Scott announced they would not seek re-election to Parliament at the 2020 general election. Along with the retirement of list MP and Māori development spokesperson Nuk Korako in mid-May, this triggered a broad reshuffle. Paul Goldsmith was promoted to be the third-ranked MP, holding the finance portfolio. Goldsmith's economic and regional development portfolios were split between Todd McClay and Chris Bishop, who was promoted to the second bench and also gained the transport portfolio. Jo Hayes was promoted to be spokesperson for Māori development and Treaty of Waitangi negotiations, but retained a low ranking. Tim Macindoe became Shadow Attorney-General and Gerry Brownlee returned as foreign affairs spokesperson.

Agriculture spokesperson Nathan Guy announced his intention to retire at the next election in July 2019. He was replaced by Bridges' eventual successor to the leadership, Todd Muller, whose climate change portfolio was passed to Simpson. The sixth and final reshuffle, in February 2020, featured minor redistributions of portfolios following announcements that Maggie Barry (on 5 November 2019), Nicky Wagner, Sarah Dowie and David Carter (all on 11 February 2020, although Carter had previously indicated his intentions on 17 October 2018) would retire at the next election.

== List of spokespersons ==
=== Original membership ===
Rank	MP	Portfolio
1	Hon Simon Bridges	Leader of the Opposition; Spokesperson for National Security and Intelligence
2	Hon Paula Bennett	Deputy Leader of the Opposition; Spokesperson for Social Investment and Social Services; Spokesperson for Tertiary Education, Skills and Employment; Spokesperson for Women
3	Hon Amy Adams	Spokesperson for Finance
4	Hon Judith Collins	Spokesperson for Housing and Urban Development; Spokesperson for Planning (RMA Reform)
5	Hon Todd McClay	Spokesperson for Foreign Affairs and Trade; Spokesperson for Tourism
6	Hon Dr Jonathan Coleman	Spokesperson for Health; Spokesperson for Sport and Recreation
7	Hon Mark Mitchell	Spokesperson for Justice; Spokesperson for Defence; Spokesperson for Disarmament
8	Jami-Lee Ross	Spokesperson for Infrastructure; Spokesperson for Transport
9	Hon Paul Goldsmith	Spokesperson for Economic and Regional Development; Spokesperson for Revenue; Associate Spokesperson for Arts, Culture and Heritage
10	Hon Nikki Kaye	Spokesperson for Education
11	Hon Gerry Brownlee	Shadow Leader of the House; Spokesperson for the GCSB; Spokesperson for the NZSIS; Spokesperson for the America's Cup
12	Hon Nathan Guy	Spokesperson for Agriculture; Spokesperson for Biosecurity; Spokesperson for Food Safety
13	Hon Michael Woodhouse	Deputy Shadow Leader of the House; Spokesperson for Immigration; Spokesperson for Workplace Relations and Safety
14	Hon Louise Upston	Spokesperson for Social Development
15	Hon Alfred Ngaro	Spokesperson for Children; Spokesperson for the Community and Voluntary Sector; Spokesperson for Pacific Peoples
16	Hon Christopher Finlayson	Shadow Attorney-General; Spokesperson for Crown-Māori Relations; Spokesperson for Pike River Re-entry
17	Hon Scott Simpson	Spokesperson for the Environment
18	Hon Jacqui Dean	Spokesperson for Local Government; Spokesperson for Small Business
19	Melissa Lee	Spokesperson for Broadcasting, Communications and Digital Media; Spokesperson for Ethnic Communities
20	Sarah Dowie	Spokesperson for Conservation
21	Hon Anne Tolley	Deputy Speaker
22	Rt Hon David Carter	Spokesperson for State Owned Enterprises
23	Hon David Bennett	Spokesperson for Corrections; Spokesperson for Land Information; Associate Spokesperson for Infrastructure
24	Jonathan Young	Spokesperson for Energy and Resources; Spokesperson for Regional Development (North Island)
25	Hon Maggie Barry	Spokesperson for Seniors; Spokesperson for Veterans; Associate Spokesperson for Health
26	Hon Dr Nick Smith	Spokesperson for State Services (including Open Government); Spokesperson for Electoral Reform
27	Barbara Kuriger	Senior Whip
28	Matt Doocey	Spokesperson for Mental Health; Junior Whip
29	Simon O'Connor	Spokesperson for Customs; Associate Spokesperson for Housing (Social); Associate Spokesperson for Social Development
30	Kanwaljit Singh Bakshi	Spokesperson for Internal Affairs; Associate Spokesperson for Justice
31	Hon. Tim Macindoe	Spokesperson for ACC; Associate Spokesperson for Foreign Affairs and Trade
32	Brett Hudson	Spokesperson for Commerce and Consumer Affairs; Spokesperson for Government Digital Services; Associate Spokesperson for Transport
33	Stuart Smith	Spokesperson for the Earthquake Commission; Spokesperson for Civil Defence; Spokesperson for Viticulture
34	Todd Muller	Spokesperson for Climate Change
35	Dr. Jian Yang	Spokesperson for Statistics; Associate Spokesperson for Ethnic Communities
36	Dr. Parmjeet Parmar	Spokesperson for Research, Science and Innovation; Associate Spokesperson for Economic Development
37	Nuk Korako	Spokesperson for Māori Development; Spokesperson for Treaty of Waitangi Negotiations
38	Chris Bishop	Spokesperson for Police; Spokesperson for Youth
39	Ian McKelvie	Spokesperson for Fisheries; Spokesperson for Racing
40	Hon. Nicky Wagner	Spokesperson for Arts, Culture and Heritage; Spokesperson for Greater Christchurch Regeneration
41	Andrew Bayly	Spokesperson for Building and Construction; Associate Spokesperson for Finance
42	Dr. Shane Reti	Spokesperson for Data and Cybersecurity; Spokesperson for Disability Issues; Associate Spokesperson for Health
43	Alastair Scott	Spokesperson for Forestry; Associate Spokesperson for Finance
44	Jo Hayes	Spokesperson for Whānau Ora; Spokesperson for Māori Education
45	Simeon Brown	Associate Spokesperson for Education
46	Andrew Falloon	Spokesperson for Regional Development (South Island)
47	Harete Hipango	Spokesperson for Māori Tourism
48	Matt King	Spokesperson for Rural Communities
49	Denise Lee	Spokesperson for Local Government (Auckland)
50	Chris Penk	Spokesperson for Courts
51	Erica Stanford	Associate Spokesperson for the Environment
52	Tim van de Molen	Third Whip
53	Hamish Walker	Associate Spokesperson for Agriculture
54	Lawrence Yule	Spokesperson for Horticulture
55	Maureen Pugh	Associate Spokesperson for Children
56	Nicola Willis	Spokesperson for Early Childhood Education

=== Final iteration ===
At the point of its disestablishment, the Bridges Shadow Cabinet consisted of the following spokespersons.

Rank	MP	Portfolio
1	Hon Simon Bridges	Leader of the Opposition; Spokesperson for National Security and Intelligence
2	Hon Paula Bennett	Deputy Leader of the Opposition; Spokesperson for Social Investment and Social Services; Spokesperson for Women; Spokesperson for Drug Reform
3	Hon Paul Goldsmith	Spokesperson for Finance; Spokesperson for Infrastructure; Spokesperson for State Owned Enterprises
4	Hon Judith Collins	Spokesperson for Housing and Urban Development; Spokesperson for Planning (RMA Reform)
5	Hon Todd McClay	Spokesperson for Trade; Spokesperson for Economic Development; Spokesperson for Workplace Relations and Safety; Spokesperson for Tourism; Spokesperson for Small Business
6	Hon Mark Mitchell	Spokesperson for Justice; Spokesperson for Defence; Spokesperson for Disarmament; Spokesperson for Pike River Mine re-entry
7	Hon Nikki Kaye	Spokesperson for Education; Spokesperson for Sport and Recreation
8	Hon Gerry Brownlee	Spokesperson for Foreign Affairs; Shadow Leader of the House; Spokesperson for the GCSB; Spokesperson for the NZSIS; Spokesperson for Greater Christchurch Regeneration
9	Hon Michael Woodhouse	Deputy Shadow Leader of the House; Spokesperson for Health; Associate Spokesperson for Finance
10	Hon Louise Upston	Spokesperson for Social Development
11	Hon Alfred Ngaro	Spokesperson for Children; Spokesperson for the Community and Voluntary Sector; Spokesperson for Pacific Peoples; Spokesperson for Disability Issues
12	Hon Scott Simpson	Spokesperson for the Environment; Spokesperson for Climate Change
13	Hon Jacqui Dean	Spokesperson for Local Government; Spokesperson for Conservation
14	Melissa Lee	Spokesperson for Broadcasting, Communications and Digital Media; Spokesperson for Ethnic Communities
15	Chris Bishop	Spokesperson for Regional Development; Spokesperson for Transport
16	Todd Muller	Spokesperson for Agriculture; Spokesperson for Biosecurity; Spokesperson for Food Safety; Spokesperson for Forestry
17	Hon Anne Tolley	Deputy Speaker; Spokesperson for Veterans
18	Hon David Bennett	Spokesperson for Corrections; Spokesperson for Land Information; Associate Spokesperson for Infrastructure
19	Jonathan Young	Spokesperson for Energy and Resources; Spokesperson for Arts, Culture and Heritage; Spokesperson for Regional Development (North Island)
20	Hon Dr Nick Smith	Spokesperson for State Services (including Open Government); Spokesperson for Electoral Law Reform; Spokesperson for Crown-Māori relations
21	Barbara Kuriger	Senior Whip
22	Matt Doocey	Spokesperson for Mental Health; Junior Whip
23	Simon O'Connor	Spokesperson for Customs; Associate Spokesperson for Housing (Social); Associate Spokesperson for Social Development
24	Kanwaljit Singh Bakshi	Spokesperson for Internal Affairs; Associate Spokesperson for Justice
25	Hon Tim Macindoe	Shadow Attorney-General; Spokesperson for Seniors; Spokesperson for ACC
26	Brett Hudson	Spokesperson for Police; Spokesperson for Commerce and Consumer Affairs; Spokesperson for Government Digital Services; Associate Spokesperson for Transport
27	Stuart Smith	Spokesperson for Immigration; Spokesperson for the Earthquake Commission; Spokesperson for Civil Defence; Spokesperson for Viticulture
28	Dr Shane Reti	Spokesperson for Data and Cybersecurity; Associate Spokesperson for Health; Spokesperson for Tertiary Education, Skills and Employment
29	Dr Jian Yang	Spokesperson for Statistics; Associate Spokesperson for Ethnic Communities
30	Dr Parmjeet Parmar	Spokesperson for Research, Science and Innovation; Associate Spokesperson for Economic Development
31	Ian McKelvie	Spokesperson for Fisheries; Spokesperson for Racing
32	Andrew Bayly	Spokesperson for Building and Construction; Spokesperson for Revenue; Associate Spokesperson for Finance
33	Jo Hayes	Spokesperson for Māori Development; Spokesperson for Treaty of Waitangi Negotiations; Spokesperson for Whānau Ora
34	Simeon Brown	Associate Spokesperson for Education; Associate Spokesperson for Tertiary Education, Skills and Employment
35	Andrew Falloon	Spokesperson for Regional Development (South Island)
36	Harete Hipango	Spokesperson for Māori Tourism
37	Matt King	Spokesperson for Rural Communities
38	Denise Lee	Spokesperson for Local Government (Auckland)
39	Chris Penk	Spokesperson for Courts
40	Erica Stanford	Associate Spokesperson for the Environment
41	Tim van de Molen	Third Whip
42	Hamish Walker	Associate Spokesperson for Agriculture
43	Lawrence Yule	Spokesperson for Horticulture
44	Maureen Pugh	Spokesperson for West Coast Issues; Associate Spokesperson for Children
45	Nicola Willis	Spokesperson for Early Childhood Education; Spokesperson for Youth
46	Dan Bidois	Associate Spokesperson for Workplace Relations & Safety
47	Agnes Loheni	Associate Spokesperson for Small Businesses; Associate Spokesperson for Pacific Peoples
48	Paulo Garcia	Associate Spokesperson for Foreign Affairs
49	Hon Amy Adams	
50	Hon Nathan Guy	
51	Rt Hon David Carter	
52	Sarah Dowie	
53	Hon Nicky Wagner	
54	Hon Maggie Barry	
55	Alastair Scott	
