= Shadow Cabinet of Todd Muller =

New Zealand shadow cabinet (May–July 2020)

- Shadow Cabinet of New Zealand
- 22 May 2020 – 14 July 2020
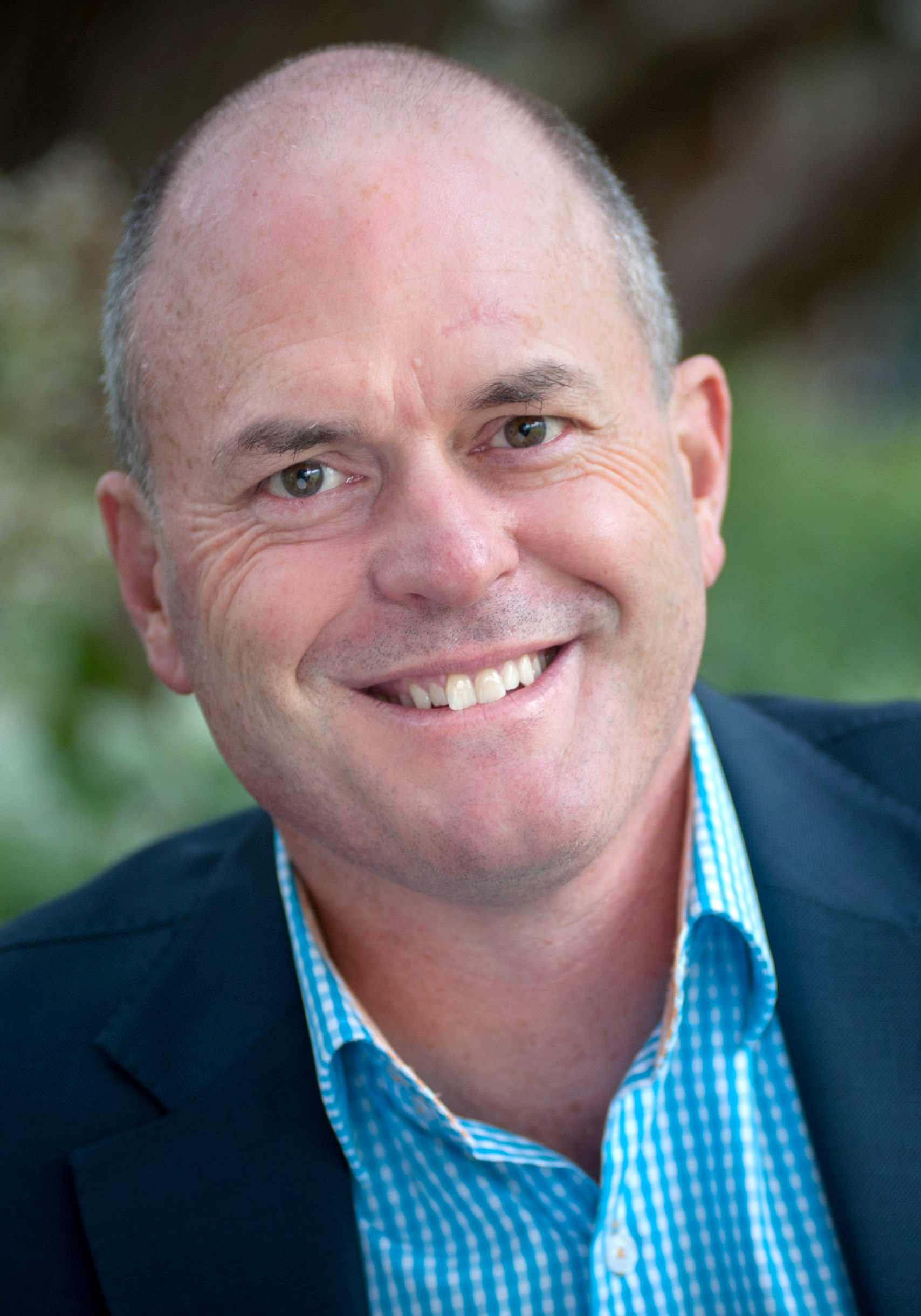
- Date formed: 22 May 2020
- Date dissolved: 14 July 2020

People and organisations
- Monarch: Elizabeth II
- Leader of the Opposition: Todd Muller
- Deputy Leader of the New Zealand National Party and Deputy Leader of the Opposition: Nikki Kaye
- Member party: New Zealand National Party
- Status in legislature: Official Opposition

History
- Election: 22 May 2020
- Legislature term: 52nd New Zealand Parliament
- Predecessor: Shadow Cabinet of Simon Bridges
- Successor: Shadow Cabinet of Judith Collins

The Shadow Cabinet of Todd Muller was the official Opposition of the 52nd New Zealand Parliament. It comprised the members of the New Zealand National Party, which was the largest party not a member of the Government.

The Shadow Cabinet was established on 22 May 2020, after Todd Muller was elected Leader of the National Party. Portfolio allocations were announced three days later. Two minor reshuffles were made during the Shadow Cabinet's duration, to reflect the decisions of two MPs not to seek re-election at the general election scheduled for September 2020.

The Muller Shadow Cabinet ceased to exist after Muller abruptly resigned the leadership on 14 July 2020 after only 53 days.

== Formation ==
Muller was voted in as Leader of the National Party in an emergency caucus meeting on 22 May 2020, replacing Simon Bridges. Former Education Minister and Auckland Central representative Nikki Kaye was voted as his deputy. At his first press conference, Muller confirmed that Paul Goldsmith would retain his position as National's Spokesperson for Finance. The following day, Muller announced that he would be taking on the Small Business portfolio.

The remaining portfolio allocations and caucus rankings were announced on 25 May. Notably, key supporters of Muller received promotions, including Transport Spokesperson Chris Bishop and first-term list MP Nicola Willis, who succeeded Judith Collins as Housing Spokesperson. Collins, a former Minister of Justice and two-time aspirant to the party leadership who did not contest the May 2020 vacancy, was appointed Shadow Attorney-General and Spokesperson for Economic Development. Selwyn MP Amy Adams, who, like Collins is also a former Justice Minister and 2018 leadership contender, rescinded her previously-announced decision to retire at the 2020 general election and was ranked third with the new position of Spokesperson for COVID-19 Recovery.

Former leader Simon Bridges was not allocated a portfolio, with the National Party press release noting that Bridges would be taking time "reflect on his future" and that Muller would offer him a Shadow Cabinet position if he decides to remain in politics. Bridges immediately issued a counter-statement that he was "not considering his future" and intended to remain in Parliament and seek re-election as MP for Tauranga. The New Zealand Herald reported that Bridges had been offered the Justice portfolio, but rejected this and instead asked to be Foreign Affairs spokesperson. These positions were filled by Mark Mitchell and Gerry Brownlee, respectively. It was also reported that Muller had intended not to assign portfolios or a rank to Bridges' former deputy Paula Bennett, who had unsuccessfully attempted to retain this position under the new leader. A year later, Bennett confirmed in an interview that Muller had told her he planned to rank her "really poorly," and "didn't see a role" for her. Ultimately, Bennett was placed thirteenth and lost her social investment portfolio to Louise Upston and role as the party's election campaign chair to Brownlee. She remained spokesperson for women and for drug reform but, in June, announced that she would retire from Parliament at the election. Anne Tolley, who had previously indicated her intention to be the party's nominee for Speaker but was demoted fifteen places in the Muller Shadow Cabinet, also announced her retirement.

The six National Members of Parliament that had previously indicated they will not contest the general election (David Carter, Nicky Wagner, Nathan Guy, Maggie Barry, Sarah Dowie and Alastair Scott) were not ranked or assigned a portfolio.

=== Criticism ===
The Shadow Cabinet received some criticism immediately after its formation for its lack of Māori representation within its top ranking MPs. The highest ranking Māori MP is Paula Bennett at 13; Shane Reti (17) is the only other Māori in the top 20. At its dissolution, the Bridges Shadow Cabinet also had two Māori in the top 20, although these were the leader and deputy leader. Muller and Kaye attracted further criticism when they claimed that Pākehā MP Paul Goldsmith has Ngāti Porou descent; Goldsmith later confirmed that he does not.

== Subsequent changes ==
Todd Muller announced a shadow cabinet reshuffle on 2 July 2020, after the recent announcement of the retirement of Paula Bennett. The changes were minor. Shane Reti was promoted to rank 13, replacing Bennett, and taking on the additional portfolio of Associate Drug Reform. Former leader Simon Bridges was returned to the Shadow Cabinet in Reti's former position of 17, and took over from Gerry Brownlee the Foreign Affairs portfolio that he had previously requested. Bennett's former portfolios were assigned to Nikki Kaye (Women) and Amy Adams (Drug Reform). Like other retiring MPs, Bennett was assigned no portfolio or ranking. Anne Tolley was also assigned no ranking after announcing her retirement, but retained her parliamentary role as Deputy Speaker.

On 7 July 2020, Todd Muller removed the portfolios of Forestry, Land Information and Associate Tourism from Hamish Walker and transferred them to Ian McKelvie, initially as an interim measure while Walker was under investigation following his admission that he provided the personal details of COVID-19 patients to the media. On 8 July, Muller told the media that he was seeking to have Walker removed from the party, following which Walker announced that he would not seek re-election. He was therefore added to the group of unranked retiring MPs, while his portfolios remained with Ian McKelvie.

To the surprise of most commentators, Muller announced his resignation from the leadership on 14 July 2020 for health reasons, after 53 days in the leadership with only 67 days until the election on 19 September (later postponed to 17 October). In an emergency National Party caucus meeting over teleconference, Nikki Kaye was elected interim leader until an in-person meeting could be convened.

== List of spokespersons ==
At the point of its disestablishment, the Muller Shadow Cabinet consisted of the following spokespersons:

Rank	MP	Portfolio
1	Todd Muller	Leader of the Opposition; Spokesperson for Small Business; Spokesperson for National Security and Intelligence
2	Hon Nikki Kaye	Deputy Leader of the Opposition; Spokesperson for Education; Spokesperson for Sports and Recreation; Spokesperson for Women
3	Hon Amy Adams	Spokesperson for COVID-19 Recovery; Spokesperson for Drug Reform
4	Hon Judith Collins	Shadow Attorney General; Spokesperson for Economic Development; Spokesperson for Regional Development; Spokesperson for the Pike River Re-entry
5	Hon Paul Goldsmith	Spokesperson for Finance; Spokesperson for the Earthquake Commission
6	Hon Gerry Brownlee	Shadow Leader of the House; Spokesperson for Disarmament and Arms Control; Spokesperson for the GCSB; Spokesperson for the NZSIS
7	Hon Michael Woodhouse	Shadow Deputy Leader of the House; Spokesperson for Health; Associate Spokesperson of Finance
8	Hon Louise Upston	Spokesperson for Social Development; Spokesperson for Social Investment
9	Hon Mark Mitchell	Spokesperson for Justice; Spokesperson of Defence
10	Hon Scott Simpson	Spokesperson for the Environment; Spokesperson for Climate Change; Spokesperson for Planning (RMA Reform)
11	Hon Todd McClay	Spokesperson for Trade; Spokesperson for Tourism
12	Chris Bishop	Spokesperson for Infrastructure; Spokesperson for Transport
13	Shane Reti	Spokesperson for Tertiary Education, Skills and Employment; Spokesperson for Treaty of Waitangi Negotiations; Associate Spokesperson for Health; Associate Spokesperson for Drug Reform
14	Nicola Willis	Spokesperson for Housing and Urban Development; Spokesperson for Early Childhood Education
15	Hon Jacqui Dean	Spokesperson for Conservation
16	Hon David Bennett	Spokesperson for Agriculture
17	Hon Simon Bridges	Spokesperson for Foreign Affairs
18	Melissa Lee	Spokesperson for Broadcasting, Communications and Digital Media; Spokesperson for Data and Cyber-security
19	Andrew Bayly	Spokesperson for Revenue; Spokesperson for Commerce; Spokesperson for State-Owned Enterprises; Associate Spokesperson of Finance
20	Hon Alfred Ngaro	Spokesperson for Pacific Peoples; Spokesperson for the Community and Voluntary Sector; Spokesperson for Children; Spokesperson for Disability Issues
21	Barbara Kuriger	Senior Whip; Spokesperson for Food Safety; Spokesperson for Rural Communities
22	Jonathan Young	Spokesperson for Energy & Resources; Spokesperson for Arts, Culture and Heritage
23	Hon Tim Macindoe	Spokesperson for ACC; Spokesperson for Seniors; Spokesperson for Civil Defense
24	Hon Nick Smith	Spokesperson for State Services; Spokesperson for Electoral Law Reform; Associate Spokesperson for COVID-19 Recovery
25	Kanwaljit Singh Bakshi	Spokesperson for Ethnic Communities
26	Matt Doocey	Junior Whip; Spokesperson for Mental Health
27	Jian Yang	Spokesperson for Statistics; Associate Spokesperson for Education; Associate Spokesperson for Ethnic Communities
28	Stuart Smith	Spokesperson for Immigration; Spokesperson for Viticulture
29	Simon O'Connor	Spokesperson for Customs; Associate Spokesperson for Social Development; Associate Spokesperson for Housing and Urban Development (Social Housing)
30	Lawrence Yule	Spokesperson for Local Government
31	Denise Lee	Spokesperson for Local Government (Auckland)
32	Parmjeet Parmar	Spokesperson for Research, Science and Innovation
33	Brett Hudson	Spokesperson for Police; Spokesperson for Government Digital Services
34	Simeon Brown	Spokesperson for Corrections; Spokesperson for Youth; Associate Spokesperson for Education
35	Ian McKelvie	Spokesperson for Racing; Spokesperson for Fisheries; Spokesperson for Land Information; Spokesperson for Forestry; Associate Spokesperson for Tourism
36	Jo Hayes	Spokesperson for Whanau Ora; Spokesperson for Māori Development
37	Andrew Falloon	Spokesperson for Biosecurity; Associate Spokesperson for Agriculture; Associate Spokesperson for Transport
38	Harete Hipango	Spokesperson for Crown-Māori Relations; Spokesperson for Māori Tourism
39	Matt King	Spokesperson for Regional Development (North Island); Associate Spokesperson for Transport
40	Chris Penk	Spokesperson for Courts; Spokesperson for Veterans
41	Erica Stanford	Spokesperson for Internal Affairs; Associate Spokesperson for the Environment; Associate Spokesperson for Conservation
42	Tim van de Molen	Third Whip; Spokesperson for Building and Construction
43	Maureen Pugh	Spokesperson for Consumer Affairs; Spokesperson for Regional Development (South Island); Spokesperson for West Coast Issues
44	Dan Bidois	Spokesperson for Workplace Relations and Safety
45	Agnes Loheni	Associate Spokesperson for Small Business; Associate Spokesperson for Pacific Peoples
46	Paulo Garcia	Associate Spokesperson for Justice

=== Unranked MPs ===
- Hon Anne Tolley (Deputy Speaker)
- Rt Hon David Carter
- Hon Paula Bennett
- Hon Nicky Wagner
- Hon Nathan Guy
- Hon Maggie Barry
- Sarah Dowie
- Alastair Scott
- Hamish Walker
