= Shadow Cabinet of Judith Collins =

New Zealand shadow cabinet (2020–2021)

- Shadow Cabinet of New Zealand
- 14 July 2020 – 25 November 2021
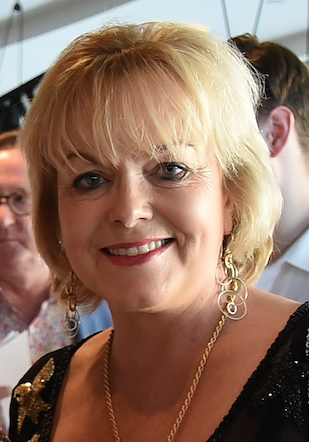
- Date formed: 14 July 2020
- Date dissolved: 25 November 2021

People and organisations
- Monarch: Elizabeth II
- Leader of the Opposition: Judith Collins
- Member party: New Zealand National Party
- Status in legislature: Official Opposition

History
- Elections: July 2020; October 2020 (general)
- Outgoing election: 2021 New Zealand National Party leadership election (did not contest)
- Legislature terms: 52nd New Zealand Parliament; 53rd New Zealand Parliament
- Predecessor: Shadow Cabinet of Todd Muller
- Successor: Shadow Cabinet of Christopher Luxon

The Shadow Cabinet of Judith Collins formed the official Opposition in the 53rd New Zealand Parliament, and previously in the 52nd Parliament. It comprised the members of the New Zealand National Party, which is the largest party not a member of the Government. On Collins' dismissal as leader on 25 November 2021, the cabinet essentially ceased to exist, but what remained was de jure led on an interim basis by her deputy leader, Shane Reti, until the next leadership election. The cabinet was succeeded by that of Christopher Luxon.

Collins came to power after the resignation of Todd Muller on 14 July 2020. She led the party into the 2020 New Zealand general election and was reconfirmed as leader after the election on 6 November 2020. Following a reduction in the National Party's parliamentary membership as a result of the election, the second iteration of Collins' shadow Cabinet was announced on 11 November 2020.

== 52nd Parliament (July–October 2020) ==
=== Formation ===
After gaining the leadership, Collins stated that she would formally announce portfolio assignations and the caucus rankings on 16 July. However, she indicated in her first press conference on 14 July that Paul Goldsmith would likely retain the Finance portfolio, suggested in a television interview that ousted deputy leader Nikki Kaye would likely keep the Education portfolio, and stated in her second press conference on 15 July that Shane Reti would replace Michael Woodhouse as Health spokesperson and join the front bench.

Ahead of Collins' announcement, Kaye and Amy Adams, who had ranked third and been a key part of the leadership "triangle", announced they would retire at the general election. Adams' retirement was apparently linked to the loss of her COVID-19 recovery portfolio. The full list of party spokespersons was announced on 16 July. Commentators noticed that the departures of senior MPs Kaye and Adams meant that the "minor" reshuffle Collins had foreshadowed was "more substantial" as a result.

National's former leaders were ranked highly: Simon Bridges at four, the same rank he had given Collins when he was leader, and Muller at eight. Woodhouse, the former Health spokesperson, was demoted and given the Pike River recovery and regional economic development portfolios. Mark Mitchell, who had contested the leadership against Collins, was also demoted, from ninth to 15th, and lost the Justice portfolio to Bridges. Chris Bishop and Nicola Willis, who are regarded as members of the "liberal wing" of the National Party and were key players in Muller's coup two months earlier, were both promoted and received new roles. Bishop became Shadow Leader of the House; Willis picked up the Education role. These promotions were regarded as replacing the more liberal but departing Kaye and Adams. Another significant promotion was that of first-term MP Harete Hipango who was moved up 21 places and made Shadow Attorney-General. Deputy leader Gerry Brownlee took a new portfolio for COVID-19 Border Response. Adams' drug reform role went to the conservative MP Nick Smith who, other than Collins and Brownlee, is the last remaining member of former Prime Minister John Key's 2008 Cabinet.

As in previous National Party portfolio allocations, only MPs contesting the next election are assigned portfolios. The press release issued with most of the changes appears to have been incomplete; the National Party website shows Paulo Garcia holding the Land Information portfolio (which previously belonged to the now-retiring Hamish Walker), Agnes Loheni in an Associate Health role, and Jian Yang in the list of retiring MPs.

==== Subsequent changes ====
Under pressure from Collins, the first-term MP for Rangitata, Andrew Falloon, resigned from Parliament on 21 July 2020 after sending sexually explicit text messages to young women. Falloon had been ranked at 35 and was spokesperson for biosecurity, and an associate spokesperson for agriculture, economic development and transport. The National Party website was updated to show that senior whip Barbara Kuriger was allocated Falloon's agriculture role and third whip Tim van de Molen had picked up Falloon's biosecurity and transport responsibilities; the associate economic development portfolio was not reassigned.

=== List of spokespersons ===
Rank	MP	Portfolio
1	Hon Judith Collins	Leader of the Opposition; Spokesperson for National Security and Intelligence
2	Hon Gerry Brownlee	Deputy Leader of the Opposition; Spokesperson for the GCSB; Spokesperson for the NZSIS; Spokesperson for COVID-19 Border Response
3	Hon Paul Goldsmith	Spokesperson for Finance; Spokesperson for the Earthquake Commission
4	Hon Simon Bridges	Spokesperson for Foreign Affairs; Spokesperson for Justice
5	Shane Reti	Spokesperson for Health
6	Hon Todd McClay	Spokesperson for Economic Development; Spokesperson for Tourism
7	Chris Bishop	Spokesperson for Infrastructure; Spokesperson for Transport; Shadow Leader of the House
8	Todd Muller	Spokesperson for Trade
9	Hon Louise Upston	Spokesperson for Social Development; Spokesperson for Social Investment
10	Hon Scott Simpson	Spokesperson for the Environment; Spokesperson for Climate Change; Spokesperson for Planning (RMA Reform)
11	Hon David Bennett	Spokesperson for Agriculture
12	Hon Michael Woodhouse	Spokesperson for Regional Economic Development; Spokesperson for Pike River Mine re-entry; Deputy Shadow Leader of the House
13	Nicola Willis	Spokesperson for Education; Spokesperson for Early Childhood Education
14	Hon Jacqui Dean	Spokesperson for Housing and Urban Development; Spokesperson for Conservation
15	Hon Mark Mitchell	Spokesperson for Defence & Disarmament; Spokesperson for Sport & Recreation
16	Melissa Lee	Spokesperson for Broadcasting, Communications and Digital Media; Spokesperson for Data and Cyber-security
17	Andrew Bayly	Spokesperson for Revenue; Spokesperson for Commerce; Spokesperson for State-Owned Enterprises; Spokesperson for Small Business and Manufacturing; Associate Spokesperson for Finance
18	Hon Nick Smith	Spokesperson for State Services; Spokesperson for Electoral Law Reform; Spokesperson for Drug Reform
19	Hon Alfred Ngaro	Spokesperson for Pacific Peoples; Spokesperson for the Community and Voluntary Sector; Spokesperson for Children; Spokesperson for Disability Issues
20	Barbara Kuriger	Senior Whip; Spokesperson for Food Safety; Spokesperson for Rural Communities; Spokesperson for Women; Associate Spokesperson for Agriculture
21	Harete Hipango	Shadow Attorney-General; Spokesperson for Crown-Māori Relations; Spokesperson for Treaty of Waitangi Negotiations; Spokesperson for Māori Tourism
22	Jonathan Young	Spokesperson for Energy & Resources; Spokesperson for Arts, Culture and Heritage
23	Hon Tim Macindoe	Spokesperson for ACC; Spokesperson for Skills and Employment; Spokesperson for Seniors; Spokesperson for Civil Defence
24	Kanwaljit Singh Bakshi	Spokesperson for Ethnic Communities; Associate Spokesperson for Justice
25	Matt Doocey	Junior Whip; Spokesperson for Mental Health
26	Stuart Smith	Spokesperson for Immigration; Spokesperson for Viticulture
27	Simon O'Connor	Spokesperson for Customs; Associate Spokesperson for Social Development; Associate Spokesperson for Housing and Urban Development (Social Housing)
28	Lawrence Yule	Spokesperson for Local Government
29	Denise Lee	Spokesperson for Local Government (Auckland)
30	Parmjeet Parmar	Spokesperson for Research, Science and Innovation; Spokesperson for Statistics
31	Brett Hudson	Spokesperson for Police; Spokesperson for Government Digital Services
32	Simeon Brown	Spokesperson for Corrections; Spokesperson for Tertiary Education; Spokesperson for Youth; Associate Spokesperson for Education; Associate Spokesperson for Drug Reform
33	Ian McKelvie	Spokesperson for Racing; Spokesperson for Fisheries; Spokesperson for Forestry
34	Jo Hayes	Spokesperson for Whanau Ora; Spokesperson for Māori Development
35	Matt King	Spokesperson for Regional Development (North Island); Associate Spokesperson for Transport
36	Chris Penk	Spokesperson for Courts; Spokesperson for Veterans
37	Erica Stanford	Spokesperson for Internal Affairs; Associate Spokesperson for the Environment; Associate Spokesperson for Conservation
38	Tim van de Molen	Third Whip; Spokesperson for Building and Construction; Spokesperson for Biosecurity; Associate Spokesperson for Transport
39	Maureen Pugh	Spokesperson for Consumer Affairs; Spokesperson for Regional Development (South Island); Spokesperson for West Coast Issues
40	Dan Bidois	Spokesperson for Workplace Relations and Safety
41	Agnes Loheni	Associate Spokesperson for Small Business; Associate Spokesperson for Pacific Peoples; Associate Spokesperson for Health
42	Paulo Garcia	Spokesperson for Land Information

==== Unranked MPs (retiring at 2020 election) ====
- Hon Amy Adams
- Hon Maggie Barry
- Hon Paula Bennett
- Rt Hon David Carter
- Hon Nathan Guy
- Hon Nikki Kaye
- Hon Anne Tolley (Deputy Speaker)
- Hon Nicky Wagner
- Sarah Dowie
- Alastair Scott
- Hamish Walker
- Jian Yang

== 53rd Parliament (November 2020–November 2021) ==
=== Formation ===
The 2020 election saw National lose 23 seats compared to its 2017 result, including 14 sitting MPs who failed to be re-elected. The composition of the new National caucus was definitively confirmed by the release of the final election results on 6 November, while the Government announced its new ministerial line-up on 2 November. Before the announcement of the new Shadow Cabinet, the party held a contest on 10 November for its leadership and whip roles, as required by its internal rules. On 6 November, incumbent deputy leader Gerry Brownlee announced that he would not seek to retain his position. At the meeting Collins was confirmed as leader without opposition, and Shane Reti was elected deputy leader, also without opposition. Matt Doocey and Maureen Pugh were chosen as the Senior and Junior Whips, respectively. The new Shadow Cabinet was announced on 11 November.

Commentary on the portfolio allocations focused on the finance role, which was split between Andrew Bayly (in the new role of Shadow Treasurer) and Michael Woodhouse (as finance spokesperson). Collins' former finance spokesperson, Paul Goldsmith, had also held that position under Collins' two predecessors as National Party leader but attracted negative attention during the election campaign after a "four billion dollar hole" was identified in the party's fiscal and economic plan. Goldsmith was demoted to twelfth-rank and assigned the education portfolio. The New Zealand Herald reported that Collins asked former leader Simon Bridges to take the finance portfolio, but that Bridges did not agree to Collins' plan to divide the portfolio across two positions. In a press conference, Collins explained that Bayly would be responsible for revenue, budget preparation and review, monetary policy, KiwiSaver and the New Zealand Superannuation Fund, while Woodhouse would have responsibility for the monitoring of government expenditure, fiscal settings debt and interest rates. The twin roles are similar to the Australian model of Treasurer and Minister for Finance, which was also used in New Zealand at the end of the Fourth National Government in 1996–1999. Attention was drawn to the fact that while the Shadow Cabinet has a Shadow Treasurer, there is no person in the Government with the role of Treasurer for them to shadow, although Collins suggested re-establishing that role if National were to win the next general election.

In addition, Collins assigned herself a new role as spokesperson for technology, manufacturing and artificial intelligence; she had previously committed, during the election campaign, to establishing a Minister for Technology. Chris Bishop picked up a new role as spokesperson for COVID-19 recovery, mirroring the new ministerial role held by Labour's Chris Hipkins. Brownlee, no longer deputy leader, was placed at 15 on the list, ahead of former leader Todd Muller at 19 as spokesperson for internal affairs and trade. National's five newest MPs were put in alphabetical order at the bottom of the list.

=== Subsequent changes ===
On 3 June 2021, Collins gave herself the additional role of spokesperson for space. On 10 June 2021, the list MP Nick Smith resigned from Parliament, and was replaced by the next candidate on National's party list, the former MP Harete Hipango. Hipango was subsequently ranked at 23 in the caucus, as Smith had been, and was allocated the two portfolios that he had vacated, Research and Science and Electoral Reform, as well as the re-created portfolio of Māori Tourism, which she had held for most of the previous Parliament. Collins signaled that a wider reshuffle was due in September 2021.

A portfolio reshuffle was announced on 28 August 2021, while New Zealand was in an Alert Level Four lockdown in response to an outbreak of the Delta variant of COVID-19. Collins stated that there were two main reasons for the reshuffle: Smith's resignation and Todd Muller's announcement that he would not stand at the 2023 New Zealand general election. Muller was ranked last and given no portfolios; his Trade and Export Growth portfolio was given to Nicola Grigg and his Internal Affairs portfolio went to Simon O'Connor. Harete Hipango was assigned the roles of spokesperson for Children/Oranga Tamariki, Whānau Ora, Māori Development and Māori Tourism. The Research and Science portfolio was reassigned to Christopher Luxon while Chris Penk gained responsibility for electoral reform.

Additionally, Chris Bishop was relieved of his role as Shadow Leader of the House. Collins' press release stated this was to enable Bishop to focus on his role as COVID-19 response spokesperson. However, The New Zealand Herald's journalist Thomas Coughlan claimed that this was a punishment for "not toeing the party line hard enough" in the aftermath of National's vote against the Conversion Practices Prohibition Legislation Bill on 5 August. Bishop was replaced by Michael Woodhouse with Collins loyalist Simeon Brown as Deputy Shadow Leader of the House. To accommodate this change, David Bennett was assigned Woodhouse's transport portfolio; Bennett's agriculture portfolio was given to Barbara Kuriger. Louise Upston picked up a new role as spokesperson for regional economic development; her land information portfolio went to Luxon. An associate economic development position, previously held by Bishop ally Nicola Willis, was disestablished.

A number of other minor changes were made. Deputy leader Shane Reti became spokesperson for child poverty, having given up the children portfolio to Hipango. To accommodate Simeon Brown's assumption of the deputy shadow leader of the house role, he was replaced as spokesperson for youth by senior whip Matt Doocey. Ian McKelvie lost the disability issues portfolio to Penny Simmonds, who had previously been his associate spokesperson. Simmonds also picked up an associate transport position from Kuriger. Joseph Mooney replaced Kuriger in the rural communities portfolio and also became associate spokesperson for space. Simon O'Connor and Nicola Grigg became associate spokespeople for the ethnic communities portfolio, and Simon Watts became associate spokesperson for revenue. Changes to the National Party's select committee membership based on the new portfolio arrangements were announced on 31 August 2021.

On 9 September 2021, following the 2021 Auckland Countdown stabbing, Collins announced that Mark Mitchell would become National's spokesperson for counter-terrorism, and would also take up a role shadowing Andrew Little in his capacity as the minister in charge of the government's response to the Royal Commission into the Christchurch mosque shootings .

Former National Leader Simon Bridges was demoted from Collin's shadow cabinet unexpectedly on 24 November 2021, with Collins citing historical allegations of "serious misconduct". Collin's demotion of Bridges prompted members of the National Party's parliamentary caucus to pass a vote of no confidence in her leadership on 25 November. Deputy leader Shane Reti assumed the role of interim leader until a leadership vote was held on 30 November, when Christopher Luxon and Nicola Willis were elected leader and deputy leader.

=== Policy ===
In late January 2021, 1News reported that the National Party had plans to contest the Māori electorates in the future following lobbying by Māori Members of Parliament including Jo Hayes. 1 News also reported that Collins was planning to announce the change during a caucus meeting the following week. On 1 February 2021, Collins and Party President Peter Goodfellow confirmed that National would be contesting the Māori electorates at the 2023 New Zealand general election.

=== List of spokespersons ===
Rank	MP	Portfolio
1	Hon Judith Collins	Leader of the Opposition; Spokesperson for National Security and Intelligence; Spokesperson for Pacific Peoples; Spokesperson for Technology, Artificial Intelligence and Space
2	Dr Shane Reti	Deputy Leader of the Opposition; Spokesperson for Health; Spokesperson for Child Poverty
3	Andrew Bayly	Shadow Treasurer (Revenue); Spokesperson for Infrastructure; Spokesperson for Statistics
4	Hon Michael Woodhouse	Spokesperson for Finance; Shadow Leader of the House
5	Hon Louise Upston	Spokesperson for Regional Economic Development; Spokesperson for Social Development and Employment; Spokesperson for Social Investment
6	Hon Todd McClay	Spokesperson for Economic Development; Spokesperson for Tourism; Spokesperson for Small Business; Spokesperson for Commerce and Consumer Affairs; Associate Spokesperson for Pacific Peoples
7	Hon Simon Bridges	Spokesperson for Justice; Spokesperson for Water; Spokesperson for Pike River Mine re-entry; Spokesperson for Māori-Crown Relations
8	Chris Bishop	Spokesperson for COVID-19 Response
9	Melissa Lee	Spokesperson for Broadcasting and Media; Spokesperson for the Digital Economy and Communications; Spokesperson for Ethnic Communities
10	Hon Scott Simpson	Spokesperson for the Environment; Spokesperson for Workplace Relations; Spokesperson for RMA (Environment)
11	Hon David Bennett	Spokesperson for Transport; Spokesperson for Horticulture; Spokesperson for Biosecurity
12	Hon Paul Goldsmith	Spokesperson for Education
13	Hon Mark Mitchell	Spokesperson for Counter-Terrorism; Spokesperson for the Government's Response to the Royal Commission's Report into the Terrorist Attack on the Christchurch Mosques; Spokesperson for the Public Service; Spokesperson for State Owned Enterprises; Spokesperson for Sports & Recreation
14	Barbara Kuriger	Spokesperson for Agriculture; Spokesperson for Energy & Resources; Spokesperson for Food Safety
15	Hon Gerry Brownlee	Spokesperson for Foreign Affairs; Spokesperson for the GCSB & NZSIS; Associate Spokesperson for Finance
16	Nicola Willis	Spokesperson for RMA (Housing); Spokesperson for Housing & Urban Development (including Social Housing)
17	Stuart Smith	Spokesperson for Climate Change; Spokesperson for Viticulture; Spokesperson for the Earthquake Commission
18	Hon Jacqui Dean	Spokesperson for Conservation; Assistant Speaker
19	Simeon Brown	Spokesperson for Police; Spokesperson for Corrections; Spokesperson for the Serious Fraud Office; Deputy Shadow Leader of the House
20	Matt Doocey	Senior Whip; Spokesperson for Mental Health and Suicide Prevention; Spokesperson for Youth; Associate Spokesperson for Social Development & Employment; Associate Spokesperson for Health
21	Maureen Pugh	Junior Whip; Spokesperson for the Community and Voluntary Sector; Spokesperson for Emergency Management
22	Harete Hipango	Spokesperson for Children/Oranga Tamariki; Spokesperson for Whānau Ora; Spokesperson for Māori Development; Spokesperson for Māori Tourism
23	Chris Penk	Shadow Attorney-General; Spokesperson for Defence; Spokesperson for Courts; Spokesperson for Veterans; Spokesperson for Electoral Reform
24	Simon O'Connor	Spokesperson for Customs; Spokesperson for Internal Affairs; Spokesperson for Arts, Culture & Heritage; Associate Spokesperson for Ethnic Communities; Associate Spokesperson for Foreign Affairs
25	Erica Stanford	Spokesperson for Immigration; Spokesperson for Early Childhood Education
26	Ian McKelvie	Spokesperson for Seniors; Spokesperson for Forestry; Spokesperson for Racing
27	Tim van de Molen	Spokesperson for Oceans & Fisheries; Spokesperson for Animal Welfare; Spokesperson for Building & Construction
28	Nicola Grigg	Spokesperson for Trade and Export Growth; Spokesperson for Women; Associate Spokesperson for Ethnic Communities; Associate Spokesperson for Arts, Culture & Heritage
29	Christopher Luxon	Spokesperson for Local Government; Spokesperson for Research, Science and Manufacturing; Spokesperson for Land Information; Associate Spokesperson for Transport
30	Joseph Mooney	Spokesperson for Treaty Negotiations; Spokesperson for Rural Communities; Associate Spokesperson for Defence; Associate Spokesperson for Tourism; Associate Spokesperson for Space
31	Penny Simmonds	Spokesperson for Tertiary Education; Spokesperson for Disability Issues; Associate Spokesperson for Agriculture; Associate Spokesperson for Transport
32	Simon Watts	Spokesperson for ACC; Associate Spokesperson for Health; Associate Spokesperson for Revenue
33	Todd Muller	No portfolios
