= Shadow Cabinet of Christopher Luxon =

New Zealand shadow cabinet (2021–2023)

- Shadow Cabinet of New Zealand
- 30 November 2021 – 27 November 2023
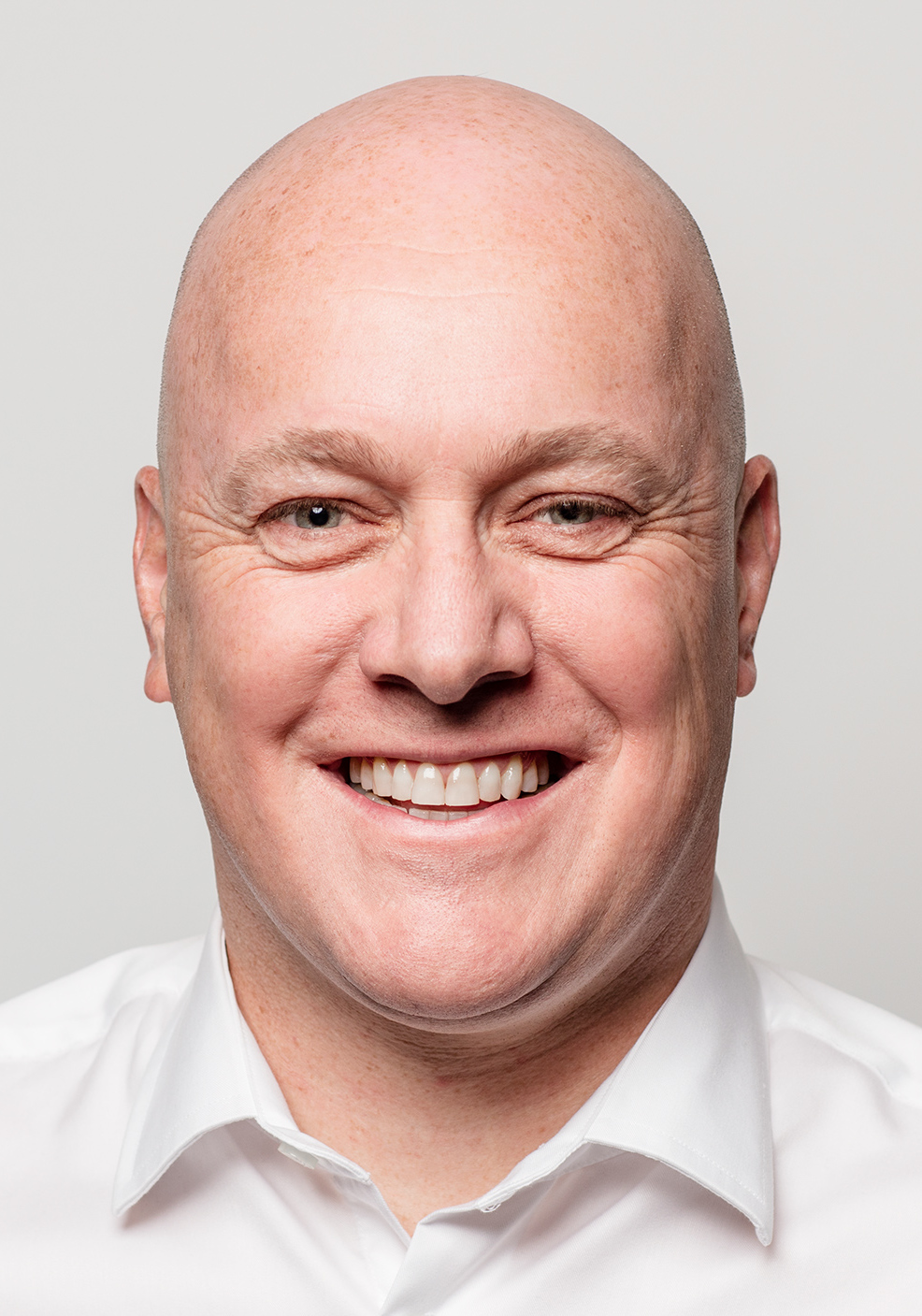
- Date formed: 6 December 2021
- Date dissolved: 27 November 2023

People and organisations
- Monarch: Elizabeth II; Charles III
- Leader of the Opposition: Christopher Luxon
- Deputy Leader of the Opposition: Nicola Willis
- Member party: New Zealand National Party
- Status in legislature: Official Opposition

History
- Election: 30 November 2021
- Legislature term: 53rd New Zealand Parliament
- Predecessor: Shadow Cabinet of Judith Collins
- Successor: Shadow Cabinet of Chris Hipkins

The Shadow Cabinet of Christopher Luxon formed the official Opposition in the 53rd New Zealand Parliament from December 2021 to November 2023, replacing the Shadow Cabinet of Judith Collins. Christopher Luxon was appointed Leader of the National Party and Leader of the Opposition in a party leadership election on 30 November 2021.

== History ==
=== Origins ===
On 24 November 2021, National Party leader Judith Collins demoted National MP and former leader Simon Bridges over historical allegations of "serious misconduct" involving fellow MP Jacqui Dean. In reality, the "serious misconduct" was just a joke Bridges had made to Dean several years earlier, causing mild offense to her, for which he had already given an accepted apology. In response to Collins' demotion of Bridges, the National Party's parliamentary caucus passed a vote of no confidence in her leadership on 25 November. Deputy leader Shane Reti assumed the role of interim leader until a leadership vote was held on 30 November.

Bridges and Christopher Luxon announced they were running for the leadership while Nicola Willis announced she was running for the deputy leadership. Prior to the leadership vote on 30 November, Bridges withdrew from the race and endorsed Luxon. As a result, Luxon and Willis were elected as leader and deputy leader.

=== Formation ===
In his first post-leadership election press conference on 30 November 2021, Luxon did not release many details on portfolio allocations that would be given out in the first iteration of his shadow cabinet, but it was confirmed that Wellington Central-based List MP Nicola Willis would be Deputy Leader of the Opposition and that she would most likely retain the Housing spokesperson portfolio.

The following day the Otago Daily Times reported that Michael Woodhouse, who shared the Finance portfolio with Andrew Bayly, was likely to not retain the role in Luxon's shadow cabinet. Luxon announced on 2 December 2021 that Bridges would be the finance and infrastructure spokesperson, ranked third in the shadow cabinet. Luxon announced the remaining portfolio allocations on 6 December. Only the first 20 were given numerical rankings, with the rest being listed by seniority. On 7 December, the caucus elected Chris Penk as senior whip and re-elected Maureen Pugh as junior whip.

=== Subsequent changes ===
Luxon carried out his first shadow cabinet reshuffle on 16 March 2022 to account for the resignation of Finance and Infrastructure spokesperson Simon Bridges, who was ranked third in the line up. Bridge's Finance portfolio was given to Deputy Leader Nicola Willis while Infrastructure was given to Chris Bishop, who also moved up in the rankings from fourth to third, while replacing Willis in the Housing portfolio. Dr Shane Reti moved up from fifth to fourth in the rankings, with Justice spokesperson Paul Goldsmith moving up from 12th to replace Reti in fifth.

On 14 October 2022 Barbara Kuriger, Spokesperson for Agriculture, Biosecurity and Food Safety, resigned from her portfolios due to a personal conflict of interest between her and the Ministry for Primary Industries. Todd Muller picked up the roles in an acting capacity pending a larger reshuffle.

National MP Sam Uffindell entered Parliament as Simon Bridges' successor through the 2022 Tauranga by-election in June 2022, although was suspended from caucus the following month before being allocated any portfolio. Following an investigation into historical bullying allegations, Uffindell was reinstated into the National caucus and, in November 2022, he confirmed in an Instagram Q and A he was the party's new Associate Spokesperson for Research, Science, and Innovation, and Associate Spokesperson for Economic and Regional Development.

Luxon announced an election year reshuffle on 19 January 2023. Former leaders Judith Collins and Todd Muller were reported as the "big winners" with Collins returning to 10th position and Muller returned to the climate change and agriculture portfolios he had held between 2018 and 2020. New MP Tama Potaka became spokesperson for Māori Development. Senior MP Chris Bishop gained responsibility for reform of the Resource Management Act 1991, losing the COVID-19 portfolio to Health spokesperson Shane Reti. Barbara Kuriger was retained as Conservation spokesperson and Todd McClay was returned to the group of twenty ranked MPs.

== List of spokespersons ==
The list of portfolio spokespersons, as of 19 January 2023, is as follows.

Rank	MP	Portfolio
1	Christopher Luxon	Leader of the Opposition; Spokesperson for National Security and Intelligence
2	Nicola Willis	Deputy Leader of the Opposition; Spokesperson for Finance; Spokesperson for Social Investment
3	Chris Bishop	Spokesperson for Housing; Spokesperson for Infrastructure; Spokesperson for RMA Reform – Urban Development
4	Dr Shane Reti QSM	Spokesperson for Health; Spokesperson for COVID-19 Response; Spokesperson for Māori-Crown Relations; Spokesperson for Pacific Peoples
5	Hon Paul Goldsmith	Spokesperson for Justice; Spokesperson for Workplace Relations and Safety; Spokesperson for Regulatory Reform
6	Hon Louise Upston	Spokesperson for Social Development and Employment; Spokesperson for Child Poverty Reduction; Spokesperson for Family Violence Prevention
7	Erica Stanford	Spokesperson for Education; Spokesperson for Immigration; Associate Spokesperson for Ethnic Communities
8	Matt Doocey	Spokesperson for Mental Health and Suicide Prevention; Spokesperson for Youth; Associate Spokesperson for Health; Associate Spokesperson for Transport
9	Simeon Brown	Spokesperson for Transport; Spokesperson for Auckland; Spokesperson for the Public Service; Deputy Shadow Leader of the House
10	Hon Judith Collins	Spokesperson for Science, Innovation and Technology; Spokesperson for Foreign Direct Investment; Spokesperson for Land Information; Spokesperson for Digitising Government
11	Hon Mark Mitchell	Spokesperson for Police; Spokesperson for the Serious Fraud Office; Spokesperson for Counter-Terrorism; Spokesperson for Corrections
12	Todd Muller	Spokesperson for Agriculture; Spokesperson for Climate Change
13	Melissa Lee	Spokesperson for Broadcasting and Media; Spokesperson for the Digital Economy and Communications; Spokesperson for Ethnic Communities
14	Andrew Bayly	Spokesperson for Small Business; Spokesperson for Commerce and Consumer Affairs; Spokesperson for Manufacturing; Spokesperson for Revenue
15	Hon Gerry Brownlee	Spokesperson for Foreign Affairs; Spokesperson for the GCSB & NZSIS; Spokesperson for Emergency Management
16	Hon Todd McClay	Spokesperson for Trade; Spokesperson for Tourism; Spokesperson for Hunting and Fishing
17	Hon Michael Woodhouse	Spokesperson for State Owned Enterprises; Spokesperson for Economic Development; Spokesperson for Sport & Recreation; Shadow Leader of the House
18	Stuart Smith	Spokesperson for Energy & Resources; Spokesperson for the Earthquake Commission; Spokesperson for Viticulture
19	Hon Scott Simpson	Spokesperson for the Environment; Spokesperson for Water; Spokesperson for Oceans and Fisheries
20	Penny Simmonds	Spokesperson for Tertiary Education and Skills; Spokesperson for Workforce Planning; Spokesperson for Early Childhood Education; Associate Spokesperson for Education; Associate Spokesperson for Social Development and Employment
	Simon O'Connor	Spokesperson for Customs; Spokesperson for Internal Affairs; Spokesperson for Arts, Culture and Heritage; Associate Spokesperson for Foreign Affairs
	Barbara Kuriger	Spokesperson for Conservation
	Maureen Pugh ONZM	Junior Whip; Spokesperson for Disability and Carers; Spokesperson for the Community and Voluntary Sector
	Harete Hipango	Spokesperson for Whānau Ora; Spokesperson for Children/Oranga Tamariki
	Chris Penk	Senior Whip; Shadow Attorney-General; Spokesperson for Courts; Associate Spokesperson for Justice
	Tim van de Molen	Spokesperson for Defence; Spokesperson for Veterans; Spokesperson for Building and Construction; Spokesperson for ACC
	Nicola Grigg	Spokesperson for Rural Communities; Spokesperson for Animal Welfare; Spokesperson for Biosecurity; Spokesperson for Food Safety; Spokesperson for Women; Associate Spokesperson for Agriculture
	Joseph Mooney	Spokesperson for Treaty of Waitangi Negotiations; Spokesperson for Forestry; Spokesperson for Space; Associate Spokesperson for Tourism; Associate Spokesperson for Agriculture
	Simon Watts	Spokesperson for Local Government; Spokesperson for Regional Development; Spokesperson for Statistics; Associate Spokesperson for Finance; Associate Spokesperson for Infrastructure
	Sam Uffindell	Spokesperson for Horticulture; Associate Spokesperson for Science, Innovation and Technology
	Tama Potaka	Spokesperson for Māori Development; Associate Spokesperson for Housing – Social Housing
	Hon David Bennett	Spokesperson for Racing
	Hon Jacqui Dean	Assistant Speaker
	Ian McKelvie	Spokesperson for Seniors

== Policies ==
=== Agriculture ===
On 19 April 2023, National unveiled its 19-point plan called "Getting Back to Farming." Key policies include scrapping two existing local and Central Government policies for every new policy brought in, doubling the number of Recognised Seasonal Employer (RSE) scheme workers from 19,000 to 38,000, creating a residency pathway for RSE workers via the Accredited Employer Work Visa, scrapping the requirement to pay migrant workers the median wage of $30 an hour, banning foreign investors from buying farms to convert into carbon farming, resuming live animal exports, amending the Government's proposed drinking standards, and deferring winter grazing rules. Agriculture Minister Damien O'Connor and Green Party environment spokesperson Eugenie Sage criticised National's proposal to scrap every two existing policies, with the former describing it as "ridiculous" and the latter expressing concern about the rollback of environmental regulations. Federated Farmers national president Andrew Hoggard praised National's proposal to defer winter grazing rules while O'Connor criticised National for its alleged unwillingness to give clear guidelines to farmers. The Green Party and Greenpeace Aotearoa New Zealand opposed the proposed resumption of animal live exports on animal welfare grounds.

=== Childcare ===
In early March 2023, Luxon announced National's childcare tax rebate policy known as "Family Boost" during his "State of the Nation" speech in Auckland. As part of the Family Boost policy, National if elected at the 2023 New Zealand general election would order the public service to slash consultancy bills by NZ$400 million. National would reallocate these funds to giving a 25% rebate to most families' childcare bills. Under National's proposed childcare policy, families earning below NZ$140,000 per annum would get a weekly rebate of NZ$75, totalling to an annual rebate of NZ$3,900. Families earning between NZ$140,000 and NZ$180,000 would be eligible for a progressively smaller rebate while those earning above NZ$180,000 would not qualify for the rebate. National's public service spokesperson Simeon Brown announced that a future National Government would also reduce the amount of public funds spent on hiring consultants and contractors. In response, Deputy Prime Minister Carmel Sepuloni claimed that National's childcare rebate policy was not well designed and would not help the bottom income earners.

=== Climate change ===
In late March 2023, Luxon launched the National Party's "Electrify New Zealand" policy with the aim of doubling the country's supply of affordable clean energy. The first part of this policy include encouraging new renewable power projects including solar, wind and geothermal by requiring decisions on resource consents to be issued in one year and consents to last for 35 years, and encouraging investment in transmission and local lines by eliminating the consents requirements for upgrades to existing infrastructure and most new infrastructure. To fix the resource consent process, National has promised to issue National Policy Statements on the Resource Management Act 1991 and "Renewable Electricity Generation."

=== Conversion therapy ===
In early February 2022, Luxon announced that National MPs would be allowed a conscience vote on the Labour Government's Conversion Practices Prohibition Legislation Bill; abandoning Collins' opposition to the legislation. The Conversion Practices Prohibition Bill passed its third and final reading on 15 February 2022; with 25 National MPs including Luxon voting in favour of the legislation and eight voting against it.

=== Education ===
On 23 March 2023, Luxon unveiled National's education policy in the leadup to the 2023 New Zealand general election. To improve literacy and numeracy in the primary school curriculum, the Party proposed introducing at least one hour of mandatory reading, writing, and mathematics; standardised testing of children's reading, writing and numeracy skills twice a year; scrapping teachers' registration fees; and creating a centralised online database for teachers to access lesson plans. Prime Minister Chris Hipkins responded that the two major parties could work to reach a bipartisan consensus on improving foundational skills for children while the Greens denounced the proposed policy as an expensive distraction. The ACT Party urged the National Party to focus on improving children's learning outcomes rather than "artificially inflated" grades.

On 9 August 2023, Luxon announced that a future National government would ban cellphones at school to help children focus on their lessons and improve their academic performance. National's proposed cellphone ban was described as unnecessary by Prime Minister Chris Hipkins, Secondary Principals' Association president and Papatoetoe High School principal Vaughan Couillault, and Wairarapa College principal Matt White who contended that schools should be allowed to decide their own cellphone usage policies. Otago Boys' High School rector Richard Hall supported a national ban on cellphones in school while Otago Secondary Principals' Association president and South Otago High School principal Mike Wright, and Waitaki Girls High School Principal Sarah Hay said that schools should decide their own cellphone policies.

=== Health ===
In early July 2023, the National Party campaigned on building a new medical school at the University of Waikato to address the national shortage of doctors and reversing the Government's cuts to the new Dunedin Hospital. In September 2023, Radio New Zealand (RNZ) reported that Waikato University's Vice-Chancellor Neil Quigley had worked with several National Party figures including health spokesperson Shane Reti, former National cabinet minister Steven Joyce and his lobbying firm Joyce Advisory to develop National's policy to establish a third medical school at Waikato. Waikato University then hired Joyce's former press secretary and political advisor Anna Lillis to promote the school. In response, Tertiary Education Union's Waikato University organiser Shane Vugler criticised the university leadership for compromising its political independence. According RNZ, Quigley had told a senior National MP that the Waikato Medical School could be a "gift" for a future National government. In June 2023, RNZ had also reported that Waikato University had paid nearly NZ$1 million in consultancy fees to Joyce Advisory. In response to media coverage, Luxon defended Waikato University's process for establishing a third medical school, and emphasised that National and Waikato had supported the proposal for several years. Luxon argued that the proposed Waikato Medical School could help address the national shortage of doctors.

=== Justice ===
==== Organised crime ====
In mid–June 2022, Luxon announced that the National Party if elected into government would introduce several anti-gang legislation banning gang insignia in public spaces and social media platforms such as Instagram and TikTok, and giving the Police special powers to disperse gang gatherings, and preventing certain gang members from associating with each other or obtaining firearms. The National Party had unveiled its anti-gang policies at its Northern Regional Conference in response to heightened gang activity and conflict that year.

In response, Waikato Mongrel Mob leader Sonny Fatupaito claimed that National's proposed policies would discriminate against Māori and Pasifika while criminologist Dr. Jarrod Gilbert suggested focusing on the gang's criminal activities. Despite supporting National's anti-gang policies, the ACT Party's firearms law reform and justice spokeswoman Nicole McKee expressed concern that legitimate firearms owners could be affected by some of the legislation. Former National Party MP, cabinet minister, and police officer Chester Borrows questioned the effectiveness of his party's proposed anti-gang policies, citing the failure of previous anti-gang insignia legislation in Whanganui.

On 11 June, National announced that it would adopt several anti-gang policies include banning gang patches in public and giving Police the power to issue Firearms Prohibition Orders, dispersal notices, and "Consorting Prohibition" notices barring gang associates from associating with each other.

On 18 June, Luxon and justice spokesperson Paul Goldsmith announced that a National government would make gang membership an aggravating factor in criminal sentencing. The policy announcement came in response to a large gang presence in Ōpōtiki during the funeral of a local Mongrel Mob leader that week. Police Minister Ginny Andersen described the policy as unnecessary, stating that existing legislation took into account gang membership when sentencing criminals.

On 25 June, Luxon announced several law and order policies including limiting judges' ability to give sentencing discounts, scrapping "cultural reports" and the Labour Government's "prisoner reduction" target, and boosting investment in victim support funding and rehabilitation programmes for remand prisoners.

==== Youth crime ====
In mid November 2022, Luxon announced that the National Party's youth crime policy would include:

- Creating a new Young Serious Offender category for juveniles aged between 10 and 17 years who had committed at least two serious offenses. The category can last for two years and would carry consequences including electronic monitoring, community service, or being sent to Young Offender Military Academies.
- Establishing Youth Offender Military Academies. These boot camps would be run by the Ministry of Justice and New Zealand Defence Force for young offenders aged between 15 and 17 years. The academies would provide education, counselling, drug and alcohol treatment, cultural support, and assigning mentors to the offenders' families.
- Banning gang patches, insignia and gatherings in public places and giving Police additional search powers for firearms.
- Funding iwi and rehabilitative community groups to support young offenders who have attended youth offender military academies.

Luxon stated that the policy was in response to a recent surge in ram raids in 2022. He estimated that the youth justice police would cost NZ$25 million a year and would constitute part of National's social investment.

National also confirmed that it would support placing ankle bracelets on young offenders below the age of 17 years. In addition, Justice spokesperson Paul Goldsmith confirmed the Party would support a law change to fit young offenders below the age of 12 years with ankle bracelets. National had earlier opposed the ACT Party's policy of fitting juvenile offenders with ankle bracelets; with education spokesperson Erica Stanford describing it as "heartbreaking."

In response, Prime Minister Jacinda Ardern described National's proposed boot camp policy as a failure while Green Party co-leader Marama Davidson described it as "absolutely disgusting." The NZ Psychological Society described "forced" military boot camps as "draconian, oppressive, and ineffective." Auckland youth development worker and advocate Aaron Hendry stated that boot camps failed to address recidivism and the causes of youth crime while Just Speak executive director Aphiphany Forward-Taua described the policy as lazy "politicking." By contrast, former Hamilton City councillor Mark Bunting opined that boot camps could help deal with high youth crime in the Waikato region and was a better alternative to sending youth offenders to prison.

In early December 2022, a 1News Kantar public opinion poll found that 60% of respondents supported National's military boot camp policy while 31% opposed it and 9% were undecided. The poll surveyed 1,011 eligible voters including mobile phone users and online panels. Those most likely to support the boot camp policy were National and ACT voters, women aged 55 years and above, and Aucklanders. Those most opposed to the policy were Green voters, Wellingtonians, Labour voters, and those aged between 18 and 29 years.

In August 2023, National's police spokesperson Mark Mitchell confirmed that the Youth Offender Military Academies would be modeled after the New Zealand Defence Force's six-week Limited Service Volunteer programme. Youth offenders would be able to undertake courses in numeracy, team-building, literacy and physical activities. He said that the Academies would last for one year and would be based at several military bases including Trentham Military Camp in Upper Hutt, Whenuapai's RNZAF Base Auckland, and Burnham Military Camp near Christchurch. The New Zealand Herald reported that National had not been in contact with the Defence Force, which offered no comment on the boot camp policy.

=== Science and technology ===
On 11 June, the party's science and technology spokesperson Judith Collins announced that National would end New Zealand's ban on genetic modification and establish a national biotechnology regulator if elected into government. This policy announcement was welcome by the ACT party and International Science Council president and biomedical scientist Sir Peter Gluckman.

=== Social development ===
On 7 July 2022, Luxon outlined the National Party's policies to combat youth unemployment during the party's annual conference in Christchurch. One key policy is redirecting funding from the Ministry of Social Development to supporting job coaches for young people under the age of 25 years who have been on the Jobseeker benefit for three months. Welfare beneficiaries who find a job and stay off the benefit for the next 12 consecutive months will receive NZ$1,000 for staying in the workforce. However, beneficiaries who do not follow their agreed plan will face "sanctions." Luxon claimed that the incumbent Labour Government's policies had caused the number of under 25s on welfare to increase by 34,000 (roughly 40%).

=== Taxation ===
On 30 August, Luxon and Willis announced National's tax plan during the 2023 general election, which they estimated would cost NZ$14.6 billion and consist of a combination of new taxes and cuts to public spending over the next four years. Key components include tax bracket adjustments, extending the upper eligibility limit of the "Independent Earner Tax Credit," introducing a childcare rebate through its "FamilyBoost" policy, and increasing the Working for Families tax credit from NZ$72.50 to NZ$97.50 weekly. As part of the tax plan, National proposed restoring interest deductibility for rental properties, cancelling the Government's app tax, Clean Car Discount, 20 hours of free early childhood education for under-two year olds, and cancelling the Auckland Regional Fuel Tax and other proposed fuel tax hikes. National also announced it would introduced a "climate dividend," which it claimed would yield NZ$2.3 billion annually. In addition, National announced that it would reduce back-office government spending in non-frontline services, and cut back on government consultants and contractors.

In early September 2023, the Chinese Ambassador Wang Xiaolong expressed concern that National's proposed 15% tax on foreign buyers could breach New Zealand's bilateral trade agreements with China. In response, National's tax expert Robin Oliver said that National's proposed tax would not discriminate against Chinese buyers on the grounds of nationality, and defended New Zealand's right to impose taxes on anyone. The Labour Party's finance spokesperson and cabinet minister Grant Robertson claimed that New Zealand citizens living overseas for extended periods could be taxed as well.

=== Transport ===
On 16 July 2023, Luxon announced that National if elected at the 2023 general election would create a NZ$500 million Pothole Repair Fund to repair local roads and state highways.

On 31 July 2023, Luxon announced that a National government would spend NZ$24 billion on transportation including building 13 new roads of "national significance" including four-lane highways, investing in three new bus "transport corridors" in Auckland, upgrading the lower North Island's railway infrastructure, and investing in road infrastructure in both the North and South Islands. Luxon had earlier proposed creating a National Infrastructure Agency to coordinate government funding, promote investment, and improve funding, procurement and delivery. In response, Transport Minister David Parker questioned National's cost estimates for its transportation policy while the Green Party's transportation spokesperson Julie Anne Genter claimed that National's proposed road policies would worsen pollution and congestion.

On 24 September, Transport spokesperson Simeon Brown said that National would reverse the Government's "blanket speed limit reductions" and restoring highway and local roads' speed limits to 100 km and 50 km respectively.

=== Voting age ===
Following the Supreme Court of New Zealand's landmark Make It 16 Incorporated v Attorney-General, the party's Justice spokesperson Paul Goldsmith stated that National would not be supporting lowering the voting age on the grounds that it regarded the current voting age of 18 years as appropriate. Goldsmith described the Labour Government's support for introducing legislation lowering the voting age as a distraction from youth crime.
