= Corran School =

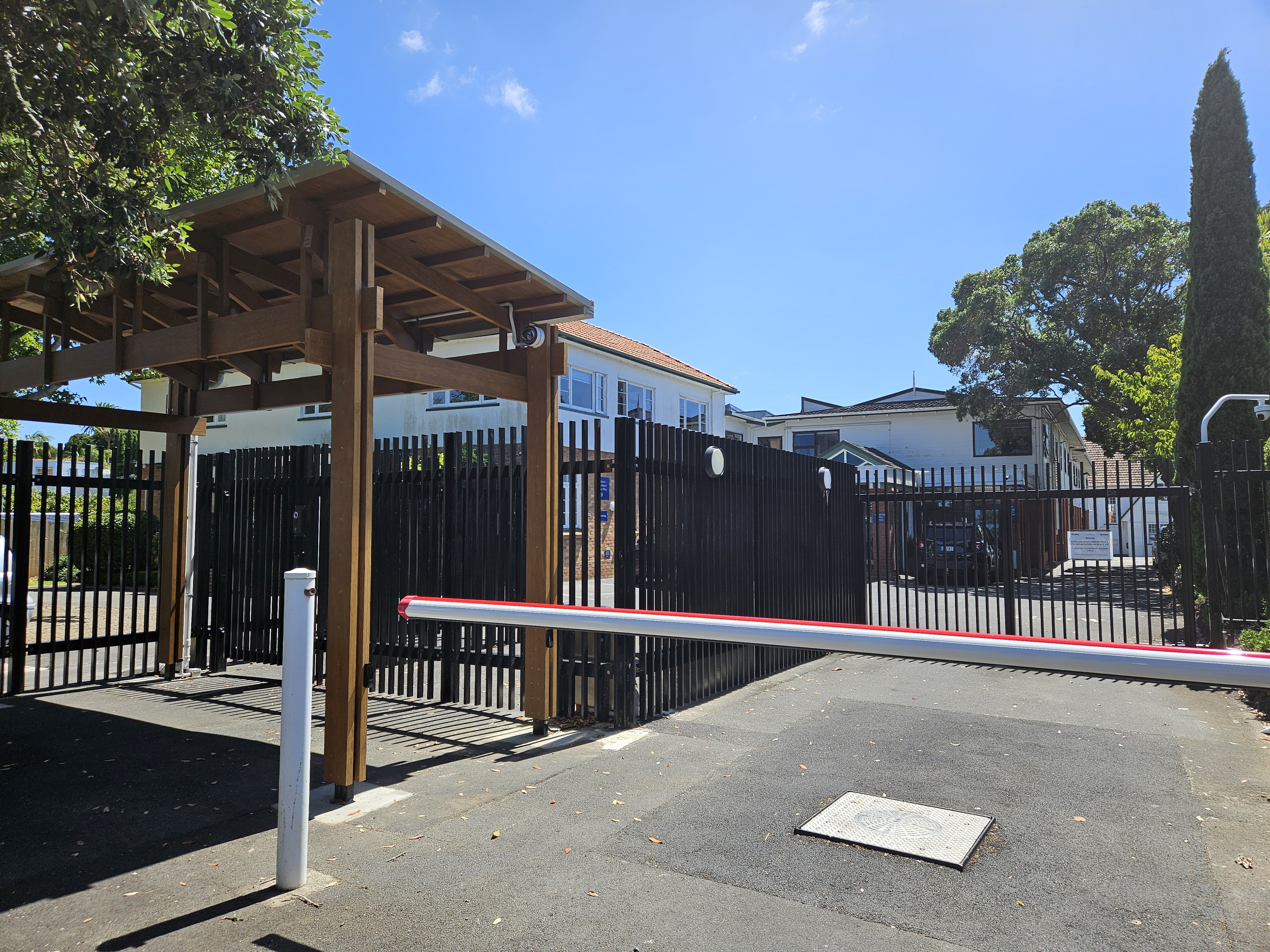
- Kadimah School, located at the former site of Corran School

Location
- Auckland, New Zealand; Auckland, New Zealand; 36°52′50″S 174°48′19″E

Information
- School type: Private Primary and Secondary School
- Motto: Gaudeamus (Let us rejoice)
- Denomination: Anglican
- Founded: 1947
- Founder: Mrs Constance Duthie
- Status: Closed
- Closed: 2009

Corran School was a small independent girls' school catering for students from ages 5 to 18 located in Remuera, Auckland, New Zealand. This school was established in 1947 by Mrs Constance Duthie. It closed at the end of 2009, and Saint Kentigern School for Girls was established at the site of the former school.

== History ==
Corran School was established by Mrs Constance Duthie in 1947 as a private kindergarten. It was initially located at her private residence before being relocated to some rooms located behind the Remuera Library in Auckland, New Zealand. Corran School was officially established as a Primary School on 28 July 1952. In 1955 the Trust Board purchased land and a building located at 514 Remuera Road from the LDS Church. This house came to be known as "Corran House". In 1956 the co-educational portion of the private kindergarten was closed, and the school was registered as a secondary school with the New Zealand Education Board. It was officially known as Corran School for Girls until 1967, when the name was shortened to Corran School. Over the following 60 years, the school expanded to encompass several bordering properties. The school remained at the Remuera site until its closure in late 2009.

Corran School had a strong relationship with the Anglican Church throughout its 62 years. For many years the students made weekly visits to Saint Aidan's Anglican Church in Remuera, Auckland.

== Motto ==
The Corran School Motto was Gaudeamus which can be translated as "Let us rejoice". This motto was included in the school emblem. Initially, the Latin phrase was incorporated around the Tudor Rose to form the school badge. The rose was later replaced with the Manuka flower, which was felt to be more appropriate for a school located in New Zealand.

== Headmistresses and Principals ==
Mrs Victoria Constance Duthie was the founder and first headmistress of Corran School. She served as headmistress from 1947 until her retirement in 1960. She was succeeded by six other headmistresses and principals, including:

- Mrs Mary Kathleen Macky (1960–1965)
- Mrs Margaret Heath Lamb (1966–1982)
- Mrs Margaret Birnie Allan (1982–1994)
- Mrs Gillian Eadie (1994–1997)
- Mrs Jacqueline Scorgie (1998–2005)
- Mrs Sally Dalzell (2005–2009)

== Closure ==
On 6 April 2009 it was announced that Corran School would close at the end of the school year. The Corran School Trust Board announced that it intended to hand over all of its assets to the Saint Kentigern College Trust Board due to ongoing financial difficulties caused by their mismanagement and lack of transparency with the close knit school community. Despite some controversy surrounding the closing of the school, the two Trust Boards forced an official merger on 7 May 2009, which had been pre-determined before announcement to the Corran School community. In a further lack of transparency, parents of the St Kentigern community were informed of the merger before the Corran families. This caused a wide rift between the two factions and even though the actions were deemed illegal after a legal review, the St Kentigern Board forced the sale in order to acquire the valuable land and assets that formed Corran School in Remuera.

== Notable alumni ==
- Nikki Kaye, M.P. for Auckland Central in the New Zealand Parliament
- Anna Jullienne, actress

== Old Girls' Association ==
The Corran Old Girls' Association survives the former school. Its stated aims include providing educational support to the school's former students and maintaining the former school's archives and history.
