= Brett Hudson (politician) =

New Zealand politician

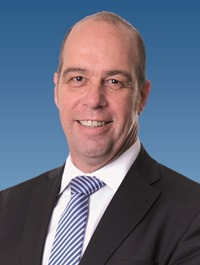
- Brett Hudson publicity photo 2014

Member of the New Zealand Parliament for National Party List
- In office 20 September 2014 – 17 October 2020

Personal details
- Born: Brett John Hudson; 1965 (age 60–61)
- Spouse: Lindsay Renwick
- Children: Three adult daughters
- Profession: IT Sales and Consultancy, Member of Parliament

Brett John Hudson (born 1965) is a New Zealand politician who was a Member of Parliament for the New Zealand National Party from 2014 to 2020.

== Early life ==
Born to Alfred "Rocky" Hudson, and his wife – Jantzen Swimwear factory machinist Carol – Hudson's family moved to Porirua in 1972. Hudson attended Porirua East School, Tītahi Bay Intermediate School, and Mana College.

Hudson undertook tertiary study at Victoria University, graduating in 1990 with a Bachelor of Arts degree in History and Psychology.

Immediately prior to entering politics, Hudson had a career in information technology, working in business development, contracting, sales and account management for major international firms such as IBM, Oracle, and Telstra-Clear – as well as New Zealand-owned consultancy StarFish.

== Political career ==
New Zealand Parliament
Years	Term	Electorate	List	Party
2014–2017	51st	List	39	National
2017–2020	52nd	List	30	National

Hudson stood in the 2011 election, but his rank of 73rd on National's party list meant he was not elected to Parliament. In 2014 election the National Party selected him to contest Ōhāriu against incumbent Peter Dunne of the United Future Party. While unsuccessful in his electorate, he was ranked 39th on National's 2014 party list, enough to become a list MP.

In opposition, Hudson was appointed as his party's Spokesperson for Police, Commerce and Consumer Affairs, Government Digital Services, and Associate Spokesperson for Transport in Simon Bridges' shadow cabinet 2018–20. Hudson retained the Police and Government Digital Services portfolios through the leaderships of Bridges' successors Todd Muller and Judith Collins.

At the 2020 election's landslide result against National, Hudson lost Ōhāriu by nearly 12,000 votes, and was not placed high enough on National's list to return to Parliament as a list MP.

=== Political positions ===
During his time in Parliament, Hudson marked himself out as a social liberal on conscience issues, by voting in favour of legislation that: decriminalised abortion; set up a referendum to enable euthanasia; and allowed territorial authorities to decide whether to permit Easter opening in their respective districts. Hudson supported all three measures in each of the three readings of the bill.

Hudson was more conservative when it came to law and order measures. He voted against cannabis liberalisation in January 2018 (in line with caucus colleagues), and supported the introduction of an Australian-inspired, 'Strike Force Raptor'-style, anti-gang squad while he was Police Spokesperson in 2019.

== After politics ==
Following his exit from Parliament, Hudson relocated to Dunedin and returned to study in economics. He has served on the board of recreational and environmental charity the Waitaki Whitestone Geopark Trust – a UNESCO Global Geopark – since September 2021.

Hudson also serves as Chair of the Audit and Risk Committee on the board of Able Minds, a mental health charity that seeks to support those suffering from distress and addicition, and their families and whānau.

== Personal life ==
Hudson is partnered with IT professional Lindsay Renwick, and has three adult daughters from a previous marriage.

For recreation, Hudson enjoys road cycling and motorcycling.
