= Michael Woodhouse =

New Zealand politician

The Honourable Michael Woodhouse
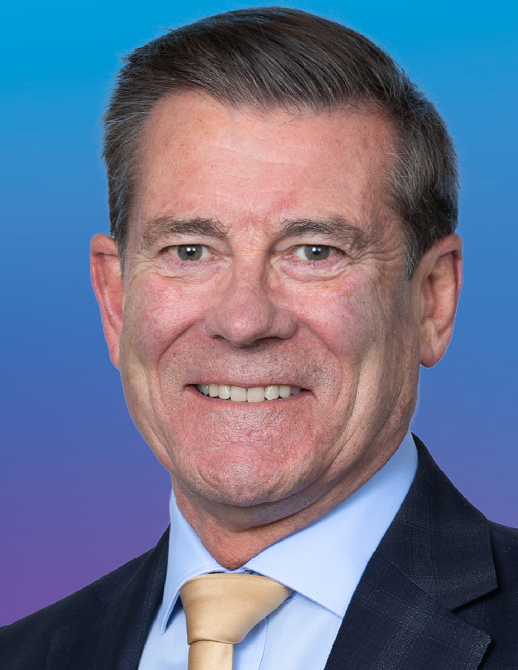
- Woodhouse in 2023

12th Shadow Leader of the House
- In office 19 January 2023 – 14 October 2023
- Leader: Christopher Luxon
- Preceded by: Chris Bishop
- Succeeded by: Kieran McAnulty
- In office 28 August 2021 – 6 December 2021
- Leader: Judith Collins; Christopher Luxon
- Preceded by: Chris Bishop
- Succeeded by: Chris Bishop

Deputy Leader of the House
- In office 2 May 2017 – 26 October 2017
- Prime Minister: Bill English
- Preceded by: Simon Bridges
- Succeeded by: Iain Lees-Galloway

12th Minister for ACC
- In office 20 December 2016 – 26 October 2017
- Prime Minister: Bill English
- Preceded by: Nikki Kaye
- Succeeded by: Iain Lees-Galloway

55th Minister of Immigration
- In office 31 January 2013 – 26 October 2017
- Prime Minister: John Key; Bill English
- Preceded by: Nathan Guy
- Succeeded by: Iain Lees-Galloway

1st Minister for Workplace Relations and Safety
- In office 8 October 2014 – 26 October 2017
- Prime Minister: John Key; Bill English
- Preceded by: Simon Bridges (as Minister of Labour)
- Succeeded by: Iain Lees-Galloway

28th Minister of Revenue
- In office 14 December 2015 – 20 December 2016
- Prime Minister: John Key; Bill English
- Preceded by: Todd McClay
- Succeeded by: Judith Collins

37th Minister of Police
- In office 8 October 2014 – 14 December 2015
- Prime Minister: John Key
- Preceded by: Anne Tolley
- Succeeded by: Judith Collins

Member of the New Zealand Parliament for National party list
- In office 8 November 2008 – 14 October 2023

Personal details
- Born: Michael Allan Woodhouse; 1965 (age 60–61) South Dunedin, New Zealand
- Party: National

Michael Allan Woodhouse (born 1965) is a New Zealand healthcare chief executive and former politician. He was a Member of Parliament for the National Party from 2008 to 2023.

== Early years ==
Woodhouse was born and raised in South Dunedin, the fifth of nine children. He attended St Patrick's, St Edmund's and St Paul's High School (now Trinity Catholic College), which he left at the end of sixth form in 1982.

He worked for the National Bank of New Zealand in Dunedin and Wellington until 1987 when he embarked on a rugby sojourn to Scotland and England, playing for Dunfermline 1987/88 and Broughton Park in Manchester 1988/89. He then returned to Dunedin where he studied commerce and accounting at the University of Otago, graduating in 1993.

He worked at Taylor McLachlan Accountants in Dunedin, Dunedin Hospital and ACC. He was chief executive of Mercy Hospital, a private hospital in Dunedin, from 2001 to 2008. While working for Mercy Hospital in 2005, he earned a Master of Health Administration degree at the University of New South Wales in Australia.

Woodhouse was convicted for drink-driving when he was 21 years old.

== Member of Parliament ==
New Zealand Parliament
Years	Term	Electorate	List	Party
2008–2011	49th	List	49	National
2011–2014	50th	List	31	National
2014–2017	51st	List	20	National
2017–2020	52nd	List	10	National
2020–2023	53rd	List	12	National

Woodhouse was first elected to Parliament in the 2008 general election as a list MP for the National Party. In six subsequent elections, he unsuccessfully contested the electorate that covers central Dunedin: first Dunedin North (2008–2017), and then Dunedin (2020 and 2023). He refused a position on the National Party list for the 2023 general election, ending his parliamentary career.

Woodhouse served senior roles in the John Key and Bill English-led Fifth National Government, including senior whip, Minister of Immigration, Minister of Transport, Minister of Police and Minister of Revenue. He was the National Party health spokesperson, finance spokesperson and Shadow Leader of the House under opposition leaders Simon Bridges, Todd Muller, Judith Collins, and Christopher Luxon between 2017 and 2023.

=== Fifth National Government, 2008–2017 ===
Woodhouse was selected as National's Dunedin North candidate in 2008, succeeding Katherine Rich who had been a list MP for 9 years but was retiring. The electorate had been held by the Labour Party for all but six years since 1922, and Woodhouse was defeated by the Labour incumbent Pete Hodgson. Despite this loss, due to the National Party's strong result, Woodhouse's position on the party list allowed him to enter Parliament as a list MP. In his first term, Woodhouse served as a member of the Health and Transport & Industrial Relations select committees. After the 2011 election, Woodhouse was elected as the National Party's senior whip.

In a ministerial reshuffle in January 2013, Woodhouse was made a minister outside cabinet and was given the Immigration, Veteran's Affairs and associate transport portfolios. In January 2014, he was promoted into the Cabinet; that October, after the 2014 election, he was assigned the Police portfolio and the new Workplace Relations and Safety portfolio. In 2016 he served as Minister of Revenue and in 2017, under new prime minister Bill English, was Minister for the Accident Compensation Corporation.

As Minister for Workplace Relations and Safety, Woodhouse caused controversy when he released a list of 57 high-risk industries for his Health and Safety Reform Bill in August 2015. This list was mocked by the Opposition because worm farming and mini golf were deemed "high risk", while dairy and cattle farming was not. Labour leader Andrew Little stated the new classifications were "overly complicated, ill-thought-out and rushed through to appease National Party backers, putting the lives of New Zealanders at risk". While Labour's spokesperson for Labour issues, Iain Lees-Galloway, said Woodhouse "can’t worm his way out of this. He will be forever ridiculed as the Minister who made killer worm farms safer but failed to protect people working in some of New Zealand's most dangerous industries".

Woodhouse also led the passage of the Shop Trading Hours Amendment Bill, which devolved to local authorities the power to pass bylaws allowing shops to open on Easter Sunday.

=== Opposition, 2017–2023 ===
Following the formation of a Labour-led coalition government with the support of New Zealand First and the Green Party, National and its former support partner, the libertarian ACT New Zealand party, formed the opposition in the House of Representatives. By this time, Woodhouse ranked 10th on the National list, allowing him to remain in Parliament as a list MP. He became Deputy Shadow Leader of the House and the National Party's spokesperson for health and immigration.

In early August 2018, Woodhouse in his capacity as National health spokesperson called for National Health Targets to be a legal requirement in response to the Labour Party's proposed Child Poverty legislation. In late August 2018, Woodhouse objected to United States whistleblower Chelsea Manning's proposed tour of New Zealand in early September 2018, arguing that she should be banned due to her lack of remorse over her role in leaking sensitive US military documents to WikiLeaks.

As Opposition health spokesperson, Woodhouse was a member of the Epidemic Response Committee, a select committee that considered the government's response to the COVID-19 pandemic. On 17 June 2020, Woodhouse claimed that a source had told him that two travellers, who tested positive for COVID-19, had made physical contact with others while travelling from Auckland to Wellington to attend a funeral. In response, the Ministry of Health confirmed that the two infected travellers had "five minutes" of limited contact with two friends during their journey.

On 18 June, Woodhouse alleged that a homeless man had bluffed his way into a two-week stay in a five-star hotel being used as a COVID-19 isolation facility by pretending to have newly returned from overseas. On 23 June, after Director-General of Health Ashley Bloomfield told media that an investigation had found no evidence to support Woodhouse's claims and that the alleged incident was likely to be "an urban myth," Woodhouse responded that he stood by his statements, saying "the absence of any evidence does not mean it did not occur." On 11 August, Radio New Zealand (RNZ) reported that official investigations had concluded that a man with no fixed abode had spent time in managed isolation, but had done so after returning from Australia, and hence had been present legitimately.

On 4 July 2020, The Spinoff reported that Woodhouse had posed with a toilet seat with a picture of Labour Dunedin South electorate Clare Curran during the National Party's April 2012 Mainland Regional conference. The toilet seat was apparently a trophy presented to a debating team headed by former broadcaster and Waitaki District councillor Jim Hopkins. National delegates at the Mainland conference had allegedly labelled Curran a "potty mouth" after she criticised KiwiRail and the-then National Government's decision to sell off Hillside Engineering in South Dunedin. In response, Curran said that she was traumatised after learning about the incident, stating that it was "worse that dirty politics." In response to media coverage, Woodhouse refused to comment about the incident, stating that "he had made no public or social media comment on the incident in eight years and I don't intend to do so now." Party leader Todd Muller also declined to comment on the incident during his visit to Dunedin in July 2020.

On 10 July, Woodhouse admitted that he had received private patient information from former National Party President Michelle Boag in late June, which had led to Boag's resignation from the National Party and fellow National MP Hamish Walker being stripped of his portfolios. Woodhouse confirmed that he had deleted the emails, stating that it was inappropriate to have leaked them. Woodhouse was criticised by Health Minister Chris Hipkins, who alleged that he had been "sitting on information" related to the recent COVID-19 leak. Following a leadership election within the National Party that was held on 15 July 2020, Woodhouse was stripped of his health spokesperson portfolio by newly elected leader Judith Collins, who gave the role to Shane Reti.

During the 2020 New Zealand general election held on 17 October, Woodhouse contested the new Dunedin electorate but was defeated again by David Clark, by a final margin of 15,521 votes. Woodhouse was re-elected to Parliament on the party list. After Gerry Brownlee resigned as National Party deputy leader, Stuff reported that Woodhouse was considering running for the position and was "taking soundings", though said that he was "unlikely to run if there is caucus consensus around [Shane] Reti. In the end, Woodhouse did not stand and Reti was elected as deputy leader unopposed on 10 November. The next day, Woodhouse was announced as the party's new finance and transport spokesperson, and deputy shadow leader of the House in Collins' Shadow Cabinet. He was promoted to shadow leader of the House in August 2021. During his tenure as finance spokesperson, Woodhouse was a member of the Finance and Expenditure Committee.

In December 2021, following the leadership election won by Christopher Luxon, Woodhouse lost the finance portfolio to Simon Bridges and the shadow leadership of the House to Chris Bishop. Luxon appointed Woodhouse the party's spokesperson for state owned enterprises and statistics. He was reappointed as shadow leader of the House on 19 January 2023. He was a member of the Governance and Administration committee between 2021 and 2023 and of the Economic Development, Science and Innovation committee in 2023.

In the lead up to the 2023 New Zealand general election, Woodhouse withdrew his name from National's party list rankings. Woodhouse said that he withdrew his name after learning his proposed position on the list. Woodhouse still contested the Dunedin electorate, a safe Labour seat that has been being won by Labour in every election but one since 1928. During an interview with the Otago Daily Times, Woodhouse stated that "being male" cost him and several National MPs a high slot on the party list, and alleged that the National Party favoured diversity over experience. Woodhouse's absence at local candidate debates was noted during the campaign.

During the 2023 election, he came second to Rachel Brooking of the Labour Party, who won by a margin of 7,980 votes.

== Later career ==
Woodhouse was appointed chief executive of Forté Health, which runs a private hospital in Christchurch, in April 2024.

== Political views ==
Woodhouse voted against the Marriage (Definition of Marriage) Amendment Bill, a bill allowing same-sex couples to marry in New Zealand. He also opposed the End of Life Choice Bill and the Abortion Legislation Bill. Woodhouse was one of only eight MPs to vote against the Conversion Practices Prohibition Legislation Act 2022 at its final reading in February 2022.

Despite his opposition to the Contraception, Sterilisation, and Abortion (Safe Areas) Amendment Act 2022 on free speech grounds, Woodhouse voted in favour of the bill during its first Parliamentary reading because the public needed to have their say on the proposed legislation at the select committee stage. Woodhouse voted against the bill during its second and third readings.

== Personal life ==
Woodhouse is married to Amanda; the couple has three children.

He is an avid rugby fan, having played for Otago and South Island representative teams in his youth. He has been active in the Parliamentary Sports Trust as a rugby player and referee, having also refereed the game before and during his parliamentary career.

Political offices
Preceded by Maurice Williamson	Minister for Land Information; 2014	Succeeded by Louise Upston
Preceded by Anne Tolley	Minister of Police; 2014–2015	Succeeded by Judith Collins
