= Nikki Kaye =

New Zealand politician (1980–2024)

The Honourable Nikki Kaye
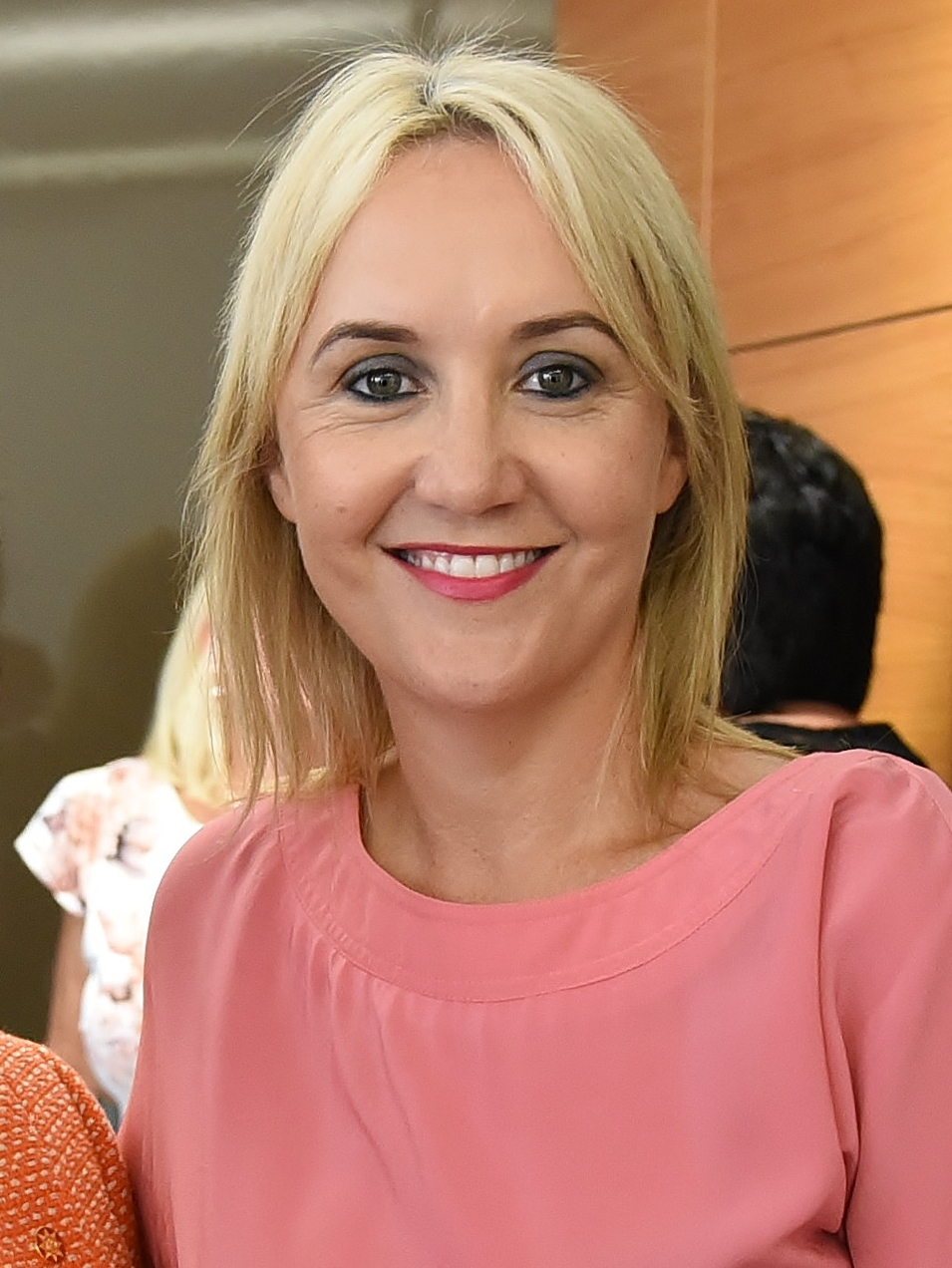
- Kaye in 2017

Deputy Leader of the Opposition
- In office 22 May 2020 – 14 July 2020
- Leader: Todd Muller
- Preceded by: Paula Bennett
- Succeeded by: Gerry Brownlee

Deputy Leader of the National Party
- In office 22 May 2020 – 14 July 2020
- Leader: Todd Muller
- Preceded by: Paula Bennett
- Succeeded by: Gerry Brownlee

46th Minister of Education
- In office 2 May 2017 – 26 October 2017
- Prime Minister: Bill English
- Preceded by: Hekia Parata
- Succeeded by: Chris Hipkins

13th Minister for Youth
- In office 31 January 2013 – 26 October 2017
- Prime Minister: John Key; Bill English
- Preceded by: Paula Bennett
- Succeeded by: Peeni Henare

11th Minister for ACC
- In office 6 October 2014 – 20 December 2016
- Prime Minister: John Key; Bill English
- Preceded by: Judith Collins
- Succeeded by: Michael Woodhouse

22nd Minister of Civil Defence
- In office 22 January 2013 – 20 December 2016
- Prime Minister: John Key; Bill English
- Preceded by: Chris Tremain
- Succeeded by: Gerry Brownlee

Member of the New Zealand Parliament for Auckland Central
- In office 8 November 2008 – 6 September 2020
- Preceded by: Judith Tizard
- Succeeded by: Chlöe Swarbrick
- Majority: 1,497 (4.38%)

Personal details
- Born: 11 February 1980 Auckland, New Zealand
- Died: 23 November 2024 (aged 44)
- Party: National Party
- Education: University of Otago; Victoria University of Wellington
- Website: www.nikkikaye.co.nz

Nicola Laura Kaye (11 February 1980 – 23 November 2024) was a New Zealand politician who served as Deputy Leader of the New Zealand National Party and Deputy Leader of the Opposition from 22 May 2020 to 14 July 2020.

Kaye served as the member of the New Zealand Parliament for the Auckland Central electorate from 2008 until 2020. She was a Cabinet minister in the Fifth National Government, holding the portfolios of civil defence and youth from 2013. In 2017, she was Minister of Education for five months.

In September 2016, Kaye took sick leave from the House of Representatives for breast cancer treatment and returned to Parliament in early 2017 to resume full duties. She left politics at the 2020 general election and died of breast cancer in November 2024.

== Early life ==
Kaye was born in Auckland and grew up in the surrounding suburbs of Epsom and Kohimarama. Kaye's parents separated when she was seven years old. Her family includes a brother and sister, "two half-brothers, four half-sisters, one stepbrother and two step-parents".

She was originally going to be called Laura, her middle name, as she said in a Radio NZ interview: "I was supposed to be called Laura, my middle name, but my dad got it wrong on the birth certificate, so I ended up being called Nicola."

She was educated at Victoria Avenue Primary School, Remuera Intermediate School, and Corran School (where she was head prefect), before earning a science degree in genetics from the University of Otago, where she also began her Bachelor of Laws. She would later complete her law degree in Wellington.

Kaye was an accomplished competitive athlete, having been the Auckland Women's 3,000 m running champion in 1997, and has raced in numerous marathons and multi-sport events. In 2008 Kaye competed in the Coast to Coast multi-sport event. In February 2013, Kaye completed the Coast to Coast race a second time, becoming the first New Zealand Cabinet minister to do so.

In 1997, Kaye participated in a television documentary called Fish out of Water, in which she and five other teenagers were marooned on Rakitu Island (off Great Barrier Island) and fended for themselves for eight days. The documentary footage was located in March 2014 and was published on New Zealand on Air's on-line archive NZ On Screen as part of its "before they were famous" series.

Kaye joined the National Party in 1998, becoming women's vice-chair of the southern region of the New Zealand Young Nationals. ("I was the only woman in the room so I was elected," she said in 2008.) She was an International Vice-Chairman of the International Young Democrat Union.

Kaye began working for Bill English in the office of the Leader of the Opposition in 2002 as a policy researcher. In 2003 she travelled to the United Kingdom, where she worked as a policy officer and project manager at the London boroughs of Enfield and Bromley, and then at Transport for London, where she managed a disabled people transport program, before working as an IT project manager at the Halifax Bank of Scotland.

Kaye founded a company, networkme.com, which developed software to help organisations identify candidates for volunteer and paid positions.

== Member of Parliament ==
New Zealand Parliament
Years	Term	Electorate	List	Party
2008–2011	49th	Auckland Central	57	National
2011–2014	50th	Auckland Central	33	National
2014–2017	51st	Auckland Central	19	National
2017–2020	52nd	Auckland Central	13	National

Kaye returned to New Zealand in late 2007 to contest the National Party candidacy for the Auckland Central electorate. Standing against three other nominees, including sitting list MP Jackie Blue, Kaye's win was considered an upset.

Kaye worked full-time as the National Party candidate from the time of her selection. She campaigned on improving public transport infrastructure, improving marine protection around Great Barrier Island, and taking a greater interest in small businesses in Auckland. During her campaign she knocked on 10,000 doors.

At the general election on 8 November 2008, Kaye was elected as National's MP for Auckland Central, defeating incumbent Labour MP Judith Tizard. This was a significant upset in the 2008 general election, breaking a 90-year hold by left-wing parties over the seat; Kaye became the first ever National MP for the electorate.

=== First term ===
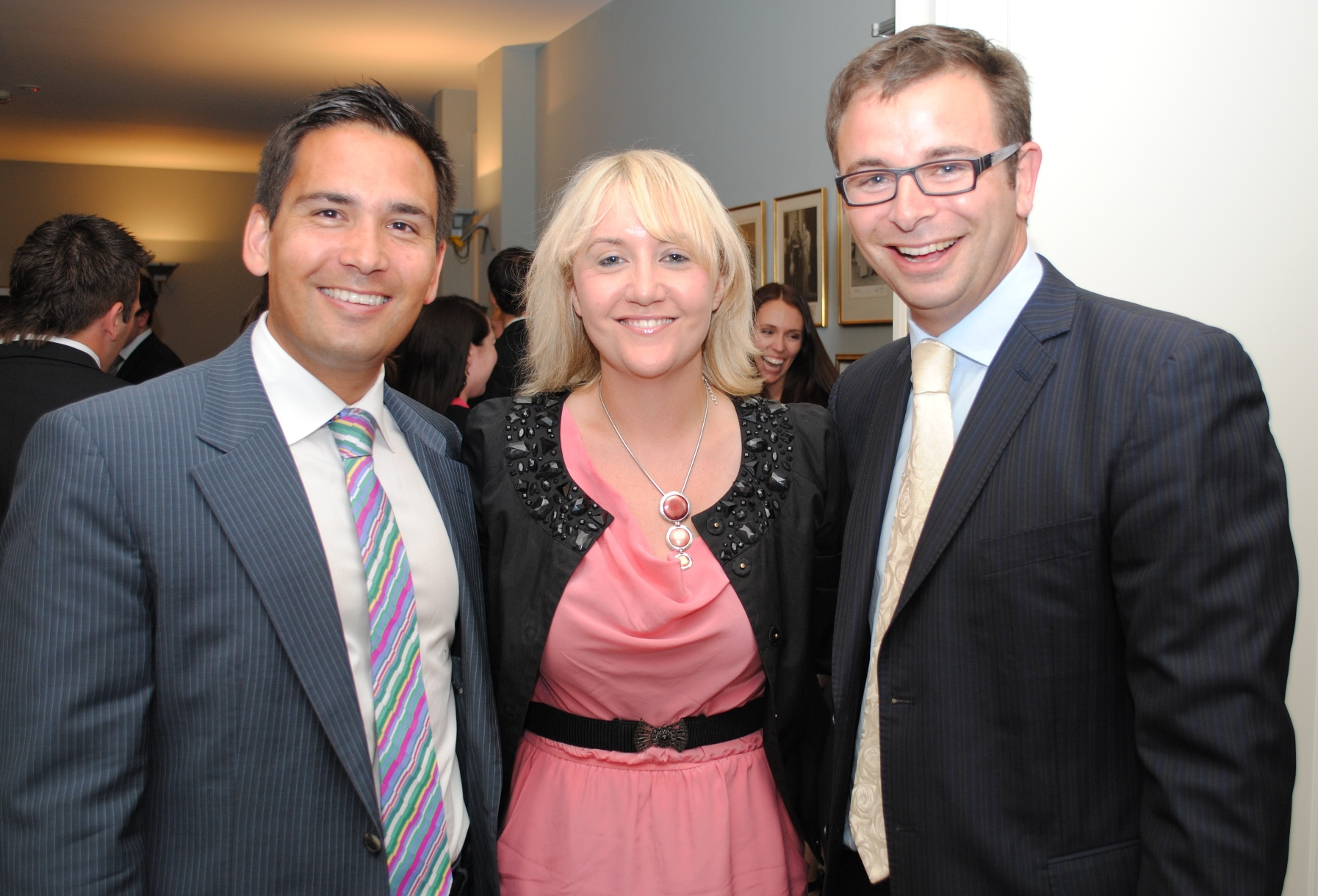
Kaye with Simon Bridges and Cameron Brewer in 2010

As an MP Kaye supported applications for the New Zealand Cycle Trail fund for routes in urban Auckland, on Waiheke Island and Great Barrier Island (the latter two islands being in her electorate as well). In early 2010, she broke with the National Party's policy of encouraging mining in conservation land, including on Great Barrier – claiming long connections to the island, and fitting in with her known support for environmental causes. She had noted during her maiden speech in parliament that "Our environment is the greatest gift we have been given as a nation", and that economical considerations, especially of the short term, should not trump this. Kaye was a supporter of reinstating trams for Auckland, and called for a feasibility study into extending the new Wynyard Loop.

She held up former National MP Katherine Rich as one of her role models. Kaye's own policies, placing her in the socially liberal wing of the National Party, were criticised by some people in her own party, where some called her a "high maintenance backbencher". Others called her "obsessive", or, in a more positive vein, "driven". However, commentators argued that her stance was unlikely to hurt her in her marginal electorate, which had traditionally voted Labour.

Kaye was elected the deputy chair of the government administration committee in February 2011. In her first parliamentary term, she also sat on the local government and environment committee and the Auckland Governance legislation committee. Through her time in Parliament on these committees she was heavily involved in the review of the Resource Management (Simplifying and Streamlining) Amendment Bill and legislation creating the Auckland Council.

In May 2011, Kaye appeared in an episode of the TVNZ series Make the Politician Work. The episode featured Kaye working a shift on a rubbish collection route and highlighted her campaign for waste minimisation in Auckland.

At the 2011 election, Kaye stood again in Auckland Central in a high-profile race to retain the seat. She was challenged for the seat by Labour list MP Jacinda Ardern and Green candidate Denise Roche, and was placed at position 33 on the National Party list. She defeated Ardern, although her majority was halved to 717, her share of the vote increased to 45.39%, due to significant strategic voting by Green Party voters supporting Ardern for the electorate vote.

=== Second term ===
Following the 2011 election, Kaye was elected chair of Parliament's education and science committee. During this time, despite her party not having a majority, she managed to progress a significant number of inquiries and pieces of legislation through the House process. At the end of 2012, the committee completed an inquiry into 21st century learning environments and digital literacy, which Kaye championed.

Kaye was instrumental in bringing a gay pride event back to Auckland, where there is a significant LGBT community in her electorate. In 2012, she worked with Green MP Kevin Hague on a private member's bill to reform adoption and surrogacy laws, which was introduced to Parliament that year. In August 2012, Kaye successfully led the campaign within the National Party to retain the alcohol purchase age at 18, despite significant support from parliamentary colleagues to raise the purchase age. On 29 August 2012, Kaye delivered a speech at Parliament in favour of Louisa Wall's Marriage (Definition of Marriage) Amendment Act 2013, which she voted for through all stages. This was met with a positive reception from members of the LGBT community.

=== Third term and promotion to Cabinet Minister ===
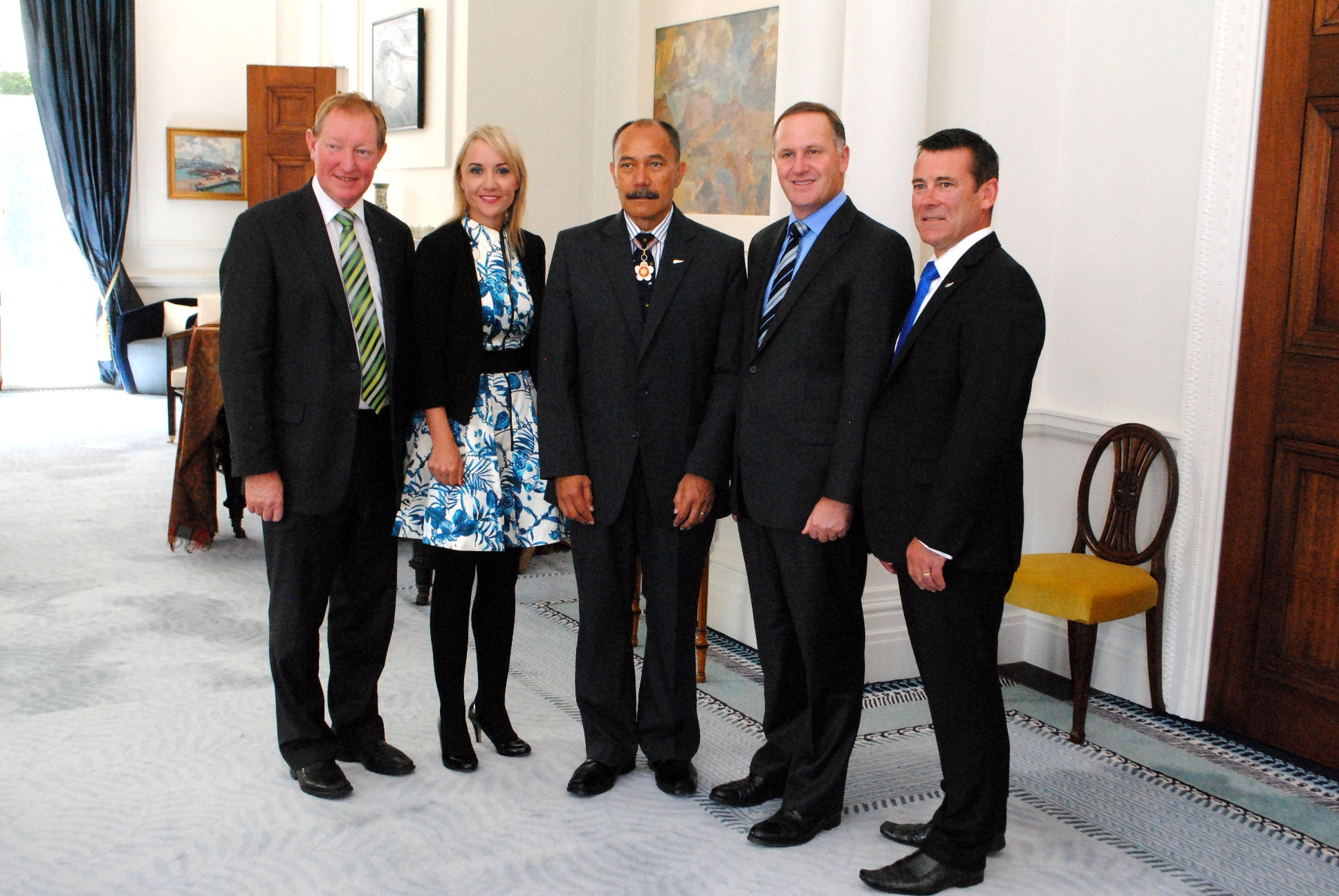
Kaye at her swearing-in as a Cabinet Minister in 2013

On 22 January 2013, Kaye was appointed by Prime Minister John Key to the Cabinet of New Zealand and was appointed Minister for Food Safety, Minister of Civil Defence and Minister of Youth Affairs, along with being made the Associate Minister of Education and Associate Minister of Immigration.

After the 2014 general election, Kaye was appointed Minister for ACC, while retaining her portfolios in civil defence, youth, and education. In September 2016, she took leave from Parliament and her ministerial duties while being treated for breast cancer. She returned to Parliament in early 2017 to resume full duties and was promoted to Minister of Education in May 2017.

Kaye retained the Auckland Central seat in the 2017 election, but National was not returned to government, after failing to form a coalition with NZ First.

=== National Party deputy leader ===
In May 2020, there was a challenge to the National Party leadership, where Todd Muller sought to replace Simon Bridges as leader of the National Party. The media reported days ahead of the vote that Kaye was understood to be Muller's running mate and was seeking to become the party's deputy leader, but she refused to confirm if she would stand, with news articles referring to her as the "presumed" candidate even hours before the vote. On 22 May 2020, the party parliamentary caucus elected Muller as leader and Kaye as deputy leader.

On 25 May 2020, she incorrectly described Paul Goldsmith as Māori when defending the diversity of Muller's Shadow Cabinet. On 2 July 2020, Kaye assumed the Women's portfolio within Todd Muller's shadow cabinet after former Deputy Leader Paula Bennett announced that she would not be contesting the 2020 general election.

Following Todd Muller's resignation as National Party leader, Kaye became acting (interim) leader for several hours. Later that day, Judith Collins was elected to succeed Muller, and Gerry Brownlee replaced Kaye. Kaye announced that she was leaving politics two days later, with her resignation taking effect at the October 2020 general election.

In her valedictory speech in July 2020, Kaye said, "To the Parliamentarians, I've always said I believe there are two types of Parliamentarians in this place: Those that are in it for themselves and those that are in it for the country. Be the latter. Be brave and have courage. Don't leave anything in the tank."

== Death ==
Kaye died of breast cancer on 23 November 2024, at the age of 44. Her father, lawyer Peter Kaye, died several days after her.

New Zealand Parliament
Preceded by Judith Tizard	Member of Parliament for Auckland Central; 2008–2020	Succeeded by Chlöe Swarbrick
Party political offices
Preceded by Paula Bennett	Deputy Leader of the National Party; 2020	Succeeded by Gerry Brownlee
Political offices
Preceded by Hekia Parata	Minister of Education; 2017	Succeeded by Chris Hipkins
Preceded by Judith Collins	Minister for ACC; 2014–2016	Succeeded by Michael Woodhouse
Preceded by Chris Tremain	Minister of Civil Defence; 2013–2016	Succeeded by Gerry Brownlee
Preceded by Paula Bennett	Minister for Youth; 2013–2017	Succeeded by Peeni Henare
Preceded by Paula Bennett	Deputy Leader of the Opposition; 2020	Succeeded by Gerry Brownlee
