= Todd Muller =

New Zealand politician (born 1968)

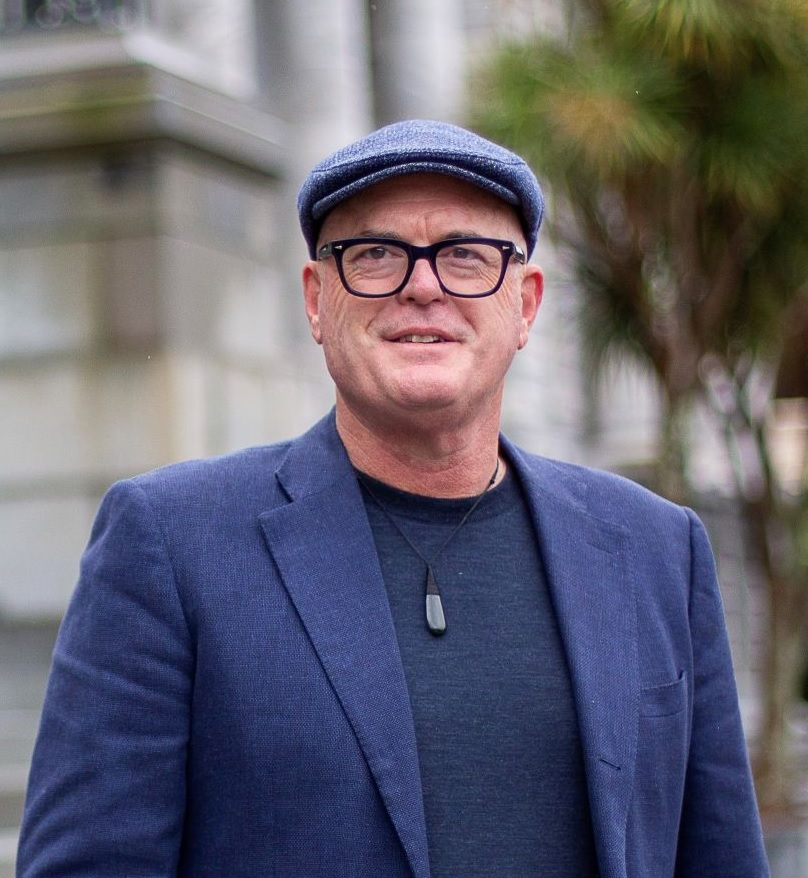
- Muller in 2023

38th Leader of the Opposition
- In office 22 May 2020 – 14 July 2020
- Prime Minister: Jacinda Ardern
- Deputy: Nikki Kaye
- Preceded by: Simon Bridges
- Succeeded by: Judith Collins

13th Leader of the National Party
- In office 22 May 2020 – 14 July 2020
- Deputy: Nikki Kaye
- Preceded by: Simon Bridges
- Succeeded by: Judith Collins

Member of the New Zealand Parliament for Bay of Plenty
- In office 20 September 2014 – 14 October 2023
- Preceded by: Tony Ryall
- Succeeded by: Tom Rutherford
- Majority: 3,415

Personal details
- Born: Todd Michael Muller; 23 December 1968 (age 57) Te Aroha, New Zealand
- Party: National
- Children: 3
- Education: University of Waikato

Todd Michael Muller (/ˈmʌlər/; born 23 December 1968) is a New Zealand former politician who served as the Leader of the New Zealand National Party and the Leader of the Opposition from 22 May to 14 July 2020. Muller entered Parliament at the 2014 general election. He was elected as the MP for the Bay of Plenty electorate, which held until his retirement at the 2023 general election. In his second term, Muller became the leader of the National Party after successfully challenging then-leader Simon Bridges. However, his mental health suffered, including suffering panic attacks, and he resigned the leadership after 53 days.

== Early life ==
Muller was born in Te Aroha on 23 December 1968, where his grandfather Henry Skidmore was mayor, and was raised in Te Puna, where his parents started a kiwifruit orchard. He attended St Joseph's primary school in Te Puna, Te Puna primary school and Tauranga Boys' College. Muller recollected in 2020 that for two years he was the only Pākehā boy at St Joseph's. He became interested in politics at a young age, once authoring a story in which he served thirteen consecutive terms as President of the United States.

He studied English, history and politics at the University of Waikato and graduated with a master's degree.

== Career before politics ==
Muller joined the New Zealand National Party in 1989. From 1994 to 1997 he worked as executive assistant to Jim Bolger during his second term as prime minister.

Muller started his corporate career working for kiwifruit company Zespri as industry relations manager from 2001 to 2003. He lists his CV as including the role of general manager corporate and grower services from 2003 to 2006, followed by a move to the position of chief executive at Apata Ltd in January 2006. Apata, a Bay of Plenty company specialising in post-harvest operations, was founded by his father and others in 1983. Muller was approached to contest the Tauranga electorate for the National Party in 2008, which was being vacated by incumbent MP Bob Clarkson. Muller declined, preferring to progress his commercial career, and the seat was won by Muller's eventual predecessor as National Party leader, Simon Bridges.

Muller started work at dairy company Fonterra as manager of local government and regional relations from February 2011 to May 2012. He then became group director of co-operative affairs in May 2012. He was part of the leadership group that responded to the 2013 Fonterra botulism scare and product recall.

Muller held various directorships in the agribusiness sector. From June 2011 to June 2014 he served as a director of Plant and Food Research, a New Zealand Crown Research Institute that undertakes research and development to add value to fruit, vegetable, crop and food products. From August 2012 until June 2014, Muller served as a director of the Sustainable Business Council. He served as a co-opted Waikato University councillor from October 2007 to June 2014.

Muller left Fonterra and his directorships in June 2014 to campaign for the 2014 general election after being selected as the National Party candidate for the Bay of Plenty electorate.

== Member of Parliament ==
New Zealand Parliament
Years	Term	Electorate	List	Party
2014–2017	51st	Bay of Plenty	59	National
2017–2020	52nd	Bay of Plenty	43	National
2020–2023	53rd	Bay of Plenty	8	National

Muller became a Member of Parliament in 2014. He was selected to replace Tony Ryall in 2014 as National's candidate in the Bay of Plenty electorate, and won by a margin of 15,096 votes. He retained the electorate in 2017, defeating Labour candidate Angie Warren-Clark by a margin of 13,996 votes. In his maiden statement, delivered on 27 October 2014, Muller stated that entering Parliament was the realisation of a childhood dream.

Muller's first term in Parliament was the final term of the Fifth National Government. Muller served as the deputy chair of the local government and environment committee in 2015 and of the education and science committee in 2016. He was chair of the foreign affairs, defence and trade committee in 2017. During the 2016 New Zealand National Party leadership election, Muller was identified as part of an internal party grouping of influential backbenchers nicknamed the "Four Amigos" with Chris Bishop, Alfred Ngaro and Mark Mitchell. The group had come together campaigning for National in the 2015 Northland by-election.

National lost the 2017 general election and Muller was assigned spokesperson roles in the agriculture, biosecurity, climate change, food safety, and forestry portfolios by new leader Simon Bridges. He sat on the Primary Production Select Committee. He was ranked 16th in the shadow cabinet. While in Opposition he was given the task of working with the Government on its Zero Carbon Bill. National ended up supporting the bill, with some caveats. Muller's work on the bill earned him respect from across the House and a lasting friendship with Green Party climate change minister James Shaw.

In November 2019, Muller heckled Green MP Chlöe Swarbrick during her speech on climate change. Swarbrick quickly retorted "OK boomer." Although there was little reaction to her comment in Parliament, her two-word throwaway remark was covered in international news media.

In December 2019, Muller criticised a Te Papa display of bottles of water representing various water sources, with water dyed brown representing farm streams, describing it as "part of the museum's continued attacks on New Zealand's farmers."

== National Party leadership, 2020 ==
=== Leadership election ===
In May 2020, Muller challenged National Party leader Simon Bridges for the leadership on a joint ticket with Auckland Central MP Nikki Kaye. The reasons cited were poll results in a Newshub Reid Research Poll. The day prior to the challenge, he had publicly denied having leadership ambitions and supported Bridges despite a media endorsement from Jim Bolger. A One News Colmar Brunton poll released the evening before the coup had Muller with the support of 0.2% of voters as preferred prime minister compared to Jacinda Ardern on 63% and Bridges on 5%.

Muller won the resulting vote on 22 May 2020 with more than 29 votes cast for him. The party's caucus was said to be evenly divided over whether the leadership change was the correct course of action. Along with Kaye, MPs in National's group of liberal MPs such as Chris Bishop, Amy Adams, and Nicola Willis were among those supporting Muller's run. Senior MP Anne Tolley, a conservative, was among those who spoke out in opposition to Muller's leadership challenge, calling it "nutty stuff", announcing that she would be retiring shortly thereafter. Another National MP, speaking to media on the condition of anonymity, described Muller in contrast to Bridges as a "pale, stale male". Judith Collins, a Bridges rival, and senior MP Gerry Brownlee joined Muller at his first press conference.

=== Leader of the Opposition ===
Muller announced his shadow cabinet on 25 May, with senior caucus member Amy Adams announcing she was reversing her previous decision to retire. Other senior positions were given to Muller allies Chris Bishop and Nicola Willis. Bridges ally Paul Goldsmith was retained as finance spokesperson. Muller stated former leader Simon Bridges was offered a shadow ministerial role but declined, saying he was taking time to consider his future. Bridges quickly stated he was taking "time out" and would stand and help win the next election. National MP Jo Hayes criticised Muller for the lack of ethnic diversity present in the new frontbench, telling media: "This is not good. We need to remedy this or you [the party leadership] need to front it and take it head-on and say why. You need to give a better explanation." On the same day, Newshub reported that several National MPs were already leaking to media against Muller and his deputy Nikki Kaye, four days after the leadership change had occurred.

On 27 May, another leak against the leadership was made to Newshub claiming the campaign chair, Gerry Brownlee, had set up an "intelligence unit" to find negative information on political opponents. Brownlee said the leaks were "disappointing," untrue, and had come from "bitter backers" of former leader Simon Bridges. As a result of the leaks to media, inability to fend off criticism over his "Make America Great Again" cap display (see below), and allegedly poor television interview performances, Muller was criticised by commentators traditionally supportive of the National Party, including Mark Richardson. Fellow conservative commentator Mike Hosking opined in his New Zealand Herald column that "Todd Muller's first full day out including Parliament was little short of a disaster."

New Zealand First, who had been relentless critics of Bridges and who Bridges had ruled out as coalition partners in any future government, warmed to the new leader. MP Shane Jones said that "... I do sense coming from [him], good vibrations in contrast to Paula and Simon." Muller indicated he would be willing to work with New Zealand First to form a new government after the 2020 election. He had previously known New Zealand First leader Winston Peters when Peters had been the National Party MP in Tauranga and Muller had led the Young Nationals at Waikato University.

Muller's first major speech was delivered at the Te Puna rugby club on 14 June 2020 and focused on the economy. Referring to the "decent society" policy under the Jim Bolger-led National Party of the 1990s, Muller stated that the New Zealand economy was not "truly internationally competitive or agile enough [or] as green as [it] should be." Muller's economic pitch was described by The Spinoff as "arguably pretty indistinguishable from the sitting government." Muller also distanced himself from some previous iterations of the National Party by describing the Treaty of Waitangi as the nation's "founding document." However, the speech drew attention for several new gaffes. An event organiser inadvertently hung the tino rangatiratanga flag upside down behind the podium and Muller accidentally referred to himself as having joined the Labour Party.

On 7 and 8 July, Muller moved to sack Hamish Walker after the first-term MP admitted to leaking personal details of COVID-19 patients to the media. The weekend after, Muller refused to appear on Q+A to discuss the incident and directed his inner circle to focus on National's energy policy to be announced the next week.

That energy policy was never announced. To the surprise of most commentators, Muller resigned from the leadership before 8:00 a.m. on 14 July 2020, stating, "I am not the best person to be Leader of the Opposition and Leader of the New Zealand National Party at this critical time for New Zealand" and that the role had had a negative impact on his mental health. At just 53 days, Muller is the shortest-serving leader of any political party represented in Parliament in New Zealand's history. After being replaced as leader by Judith Collins, and taking sick leave for nearly four weeks, Muller stated in interviews, "I had anxiety. I had experienced that quite severely and I had panic attacks" that began on 27 May, five days after taking the leadership. He also ruled out another bid for the party leadership.

== Post-leadership ==
=== Third term in Parliament ===
In the 2020 New Zealand general election held in October, Muller retained his Bay of Plenty seat, defeating Labour candidate Angie Warren-Clark by a margin of 3,415 votes. He was assigned responsibility for internal affairs and trade in the Shadow Cabinet of Judith Collins. Muller also became a mental health advocate.

On 11 March 2021, Muller's Sunscreen (Product Safety Standard) Bill was pulled from the ballot. This Bill would allow consumers to seek redress under the Fair Trading Act 1986 if the sunscreen that they used was found to be weaker than its label. The bill passed its first reading on 7 April 2021. On 2 March 2022, the bill passed its third reading with unanimous cross-party support. As a result, sunscreen producers whose products fail to provide the protection they promised can be fined under the Fair Trading Act. Muller stated that the new legislation would give New Zealand customers confidence in sunscreen products that they purchased. The Sunscreen Product Safety Standard Act 2022 received royal assent on 8 March 2022.

=== Retirement announcement, reversal, and re-announcement ===
On 16 June 2021, Newsroom published an article on returning National MP Harete Hipango featuring negative comments from some MPs. At a late-night meeting on 22 June 2021, Muller admitted to the National caucus that he had been one of the MPs quoted, and apologised for the comments. He also admitted that for several years he had been providing inside information about the party to Richard Harman, the proprietor of the political news website Politik. According to the New Zealand Herald, Collins threatened to have the caucus vote to suspend him if he did not step down, while Chris Bishop urged him to leave with dignity "for the good of the party."

The next day, Muller announced that he would not stand for re-election at New Zealand's next general election. Muller declined to comment on any connection between his admission of speaking to Newsroom and his retirement, and cited health reasons for the resignation. He also took six weeks of leave after the announcement. Collins refused to say why Muller was resigning, or whether she felt Muller should leave Parliament before the next election. On 30 July 2021, Newsroom reported that Muller would not be returning to work at Parliament that week as scheduled, but would instead take a further three weeks of leave. A week later, 1News reported that Muller would not attend National caucus meetings when he did return to Parliament.

On 21 August 2021, the Bay of Plenty Times published an interview with Muller where he stated that he intended to return to Parliament when it next sat and to serve until the end of the term, despite speculation that he would leave earlier. In reflecting on his decisions over the previous 16 months, he said "I'm comfortable with what I've done with one exception – clearly my comments with respect to Harete [Hipango] were a mistake and I've apologised for that." Concerning the fallout from those comments, Muller said he bears Judith Collins "no ill will," while acknowledging that "the relationship between the two of us has broken down."

In December 2021, Christopher Luxon took over leadership of the National Party from Judith Collins. Subsequently, Muller announced that he had reversed his decision and would not retire. It was reported that Luxon asked him to stay on. Muller became the National Party's spokesperson for oceans and fisheries and internal affairs in the Luxon shadow cabinet. In October 2022, Muller also became National's acting spokesperson for agriculture, biosecurity, and food safety after Barbara Kuriger resigned from those positions due to a personal conflict of interest. Following a reshuffle in January 2023, Muller was confirmed as National's agriculture spokesperson and also became the party's climate change spokesperson. He was promoted to 12th place in Luxon's shadow cabinet.

In March 2023, Muller announced he would, in fact, leave politics at the 2023 general election, stating that he did not "have enough fire in the belly for the job" and that he would like to spend more time with his family. His spokesperson roles were assigned to other National MPs. In exit interviews, he said that he did not think that his mental health would withstand the pressures of a ministerial role.

== Political views ==
Muller takes a socially conservative position on issues such as abortion, euthanasia and drug liberalisation. He voted against the Abortion Legislation Bill and the End of Life Choice Bill, and supported the Contraception, Sterilisation, and Abortion (Safe Areas) Amendment Bill and Conversion Practices Prohibition Legislation Bill.

He has called for greater action on climate change, having worked with Jacinda Ardern's government on the Zero Carbon Bill.

Muller is an admirer of American politics. He received attention in 2020 for his intention to display a 'Make America Great Again' cap in his Parliamentary office as part of a collection of American political memorabilia, with a Muslim community leader calling on him to leave it at home. Muller responded that he was "very comfortable" including it in his collection and that he hoped people would understand the context of the display. He later changed his mind and decided not to display it. After seeing both of them speak in person, Muller stated that he believed Biden was better at delivering speeches than Trump.

During his valedictory speech, Muller called for New Zealand to be realistic about its ability to address climate change based on its "size, distance from market, infrastructure vulnerabilities, and balance sheet capacity." He also criticised political parties for using mental health policy as a "regular political sport" and called for bipartisan action on addressing mental health. Muller has also expressed concern about growing partisanship on issues relating to Māori and the Treaty of Waitangi, which in his view is fuelling a level of political toxicity that is corrosive to our society." Muller also talked about the need for partisanship on these issues. On the issues of voting and representation, he stated "I believe one person, one vote is the bedrock of democracy, but bedrocks can be built on, so where there is inequality in political representation, we should be open to ensuring these voices can see a pathway for greater representation. For if our political institutions are to endure, they must reflect our changing country."

== Personal life ==
Muller and his wife have three children. Muller is a practising Catholic. Muller has had five skin cancers cut from his body, prompting his interest in legislation regulating the use of sunscreens in New Zealand.

New Zealand Parliament
Preceded by Tony Ryall	Member of Parliament for Bay of Plenty; 2014–2023	Succeeded by Tom Rutherford
Political offices
Preceded by Simon Bridges	Leader of the Opposition; 2020	Succeeded by Judith Collins
Party political offices
Preceded by Simon Bridges	Leader of the National party 2020	Succeeded by Judith Collins
