= Alastair Scott (politician) =

New Zealand politician

Member of the New Zealand Parliament for Wairarapa
- In office 20 September 2014 – 17 October 2020
- Preceded by: John Hayes
- Succeeded by: Kieran McAnulty

Personal details
- Born: 18 September 1965 (age 61) Wellington, New Zealand
- Party: National
- Domestic partner: Robyn Noble-Campbell
- Children: six

Alastair Oliver Scott (born 18 September 1965) is a New Zealand politician who was elected to the New Zealand parliament at the 2014 general election as a representative of the New Zealand National Party.

== Private life and business interests ==
Scott grew up in Auckland and Wellington attending Wellington College and then Massey University in Palmerston North. He is the owner of the Matahiwi Estate winery.

Scott and his partner Robyn Noble-Campbell share their time between homes in the Wellington suburb of Kelburn (their primary home) and Masterton. Both of them have three children each.

== Political career ==
New Zealand Parliament
Years	Term	Electorate	List	Party
2014–2017	51st	Wairarapa	61	National
2017–2020	52nd	Wairarapa	46	National

Scott defeated Jo Hayes to win the National Party's selection for the Wairarapa electorate at the 2014 election. The late entry of Carterton mayor and former MP Ron Mark for New Zealand First turned the 2014 election into a "three-horse race" with Labour's Kieran McAnulty and Scott. In the end, Scott had a clear majority over McAnulty, with Mark slightly behind in third place. He won the Wairarapa seat again in the 2017 New Zealand general election with a reduced majority, and placed 46th on the party list.

On 25 June 2019, Scott announced that he would not contest the 2020 general election.
