= Shadow Leader of the House (New Zealand) =

New Zealand political title

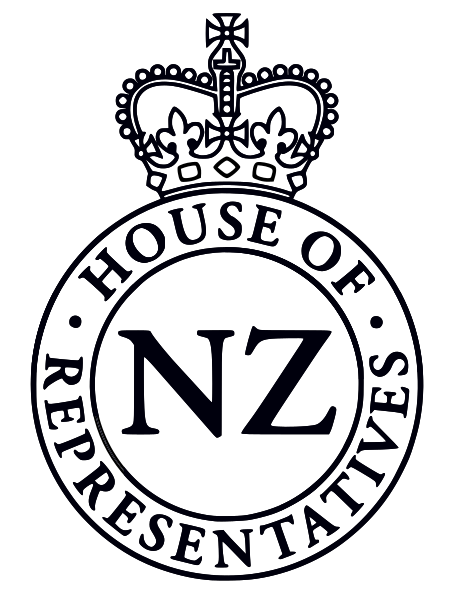

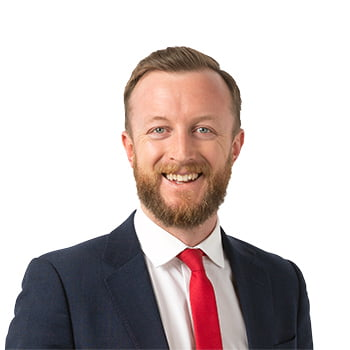
- Incumbent; Hon Kieran McAnulty since 30 November 2023
- Member of: Shadow Cabinet
- Appointer: Leader of the Opposition
- Inaugural holder: Bill Birch
- Formation: 7 April 1986
- Deputy: Tangi Utikere

In the New Zealand Parliament, the shadow leader of the House is traditionally appointed by the largest Opposition party. The position is currently held by Kieran McAnulty, a member of the New Zealand Labour Party.

== List of shadow leaders of the House ==
The following individuals have been appointed as shadow leader of the New Zealand House of Representatives:

Key

National Labour

No.	Name	Portrait	Term of Office		Leader
1	Bill Birch		7 April 1986	2 November 1990	Bolger
2	Jonathan Hunt		27 November 1990	10 December 1999	Moore
2	Jonathan Hunt		27 November 1990	10 December 1999	Clark
3	Roger Sowry		15 December 1999	8 October 2001	Shipley
4	Gerry Brownlee		8 October 2001	19 November 2008	English
4	Gerry Brownlee		8 October 2001	19 November 2008	Brash
4	Gerry Brownlee		8 October 2001	19 November 2008	Key
5	Michael Cullen		20 November 2008	29 April 2009	Goff
6	Darren Hughes		5 May 2009	3 February 2011	Goff
7	Trevor Mallard		3 February 2011	23 September 2013	Goff
7	Trevor Mallard		3 February 2011	23 September 2013	Shearer
8	Grant Robertson		23 September 2013	24 November 2014	Cunliffe
9	Chris Hipkins		24 November 2014	26 October 2017	Little
9	Chris Hipkins		24 November 2014	26 October 2017	Ardern
10	Simon Bridges		2 November 2017	27 February 2018	English
(4)	Gerry Brownlee		27 February 2018	14 July 2020	Bridges
(4)	Gerry Brownlee		27 February 2018	14 July 2020	Muller
11	Chris Bishop		14 July 2020	28 August 2021	Collins
12	Michael Woodhouse	Michael Woodhouse	28 August 2021	6 December 2021	Collins
(11)	Chris Bishop		6 December 2021	19 January 2023	Luxon
(12)	Michael Woodhouse	Michael Woodhouse	19 January 2023	14 October 2023	Luxon
13	Kieran McAnulty		30 November 2023	present	Hipkins

== See also ==
- Leader of the Opposition – Leader of the largest faction of a legislature that is not in government
- Minority leader – Legislative political position
- Shadow cabinet – Feature of the Westminster system of government
