= Dipton, New Zealand =

Dipton
- Interactive map of Dipton
- Coordinates: 45°54′S 168°22′E
- Country: New Zealand
- Region: Southland region
- Territorial authorities of New Zealand: Southland District
- Ward: Oreti Ward
- Community: Oreti Community
- Electorates: Southland; Te Tai Tonga (Māori)

Government
  - Territorial authority: Southland District Council
  - Regional council: Southland Regional Council
  - Mayor of Southland: Rob Scott
  - Southland MP: Joseph Mooney
  - Te Tai Tonga MP: Tākuta Ferris

Dipton is a small town in the Southland region of New Zealand. It is located 20 kilometres south of Lumsden and 60 kilometres north of Invercargill, on the banks of the Ōreti River. From 20 October 1875 until its closure on 13 December 1982, Dipton was situated on the Kingston Branch railway.

Dipton is the hometown of former New Zealand National Party leader and former prime minister, Bill English, who was born in nearby Lumsden. It is also the birthplace of Todd Barclay, who succeeded English as the electorate MP for Clutha-Southland.

Dipton is also close to the White Hill Wind Farm, completed in 2007 by New Zealand state-owned enterprise Meridian Energy.

== Demographics ==
Dipton is part of the statistical area of Oreti River, which surrounds but does not include Winton, and covers 629.89 km^{2} (243.20 sq mi). It had an estimated population of 2,360 as of June 2025, with a population density of 3.7 people per km^{2}.

Historical population for Oteti River
Year	Pop.	±% p.a.
2006	1,926	—
2013	2,169	+1.71%
2018	2,100	−0.64%

Oreti River had a population of 2,100 at the 2018 New Zealand census, a decrease of 69 people (−3.2%) since the 2013 census, and an increase of 174 people (9.0%) since the 2006 census. There were 774 households, comprising 1,098 males and 1,002 females, giving a sex ratio of 1.1 males per female. The median age was 38.3 years (compared with 37.4 years nationally), with 480 people (22.9%) aged under 15 years, 354 (16.9%) aged 15 to 29, 981 (46.7%) aged 30 to 64, and 285 (13.6%) aged 65 or older.

Ethnicities were 89.6% European/Pākehā, 7.9% Māori, 0.6% Pasifika, 7.3% Asian, and 1.7% other ethnicities. People may identify with more than one ethnicity.

The percentage of people born overseas was 15.0, compared with 27.1% nationally.

Although some people chose not to answer the census's question about religious affiliation, 46.3% had no religion, 45.7% were Christian, 0.6% had Māori religious beliefs, 0.6% were Hindu, 0.1% were Buddhist and 0.7% had other religions.

Of those at least 15 years old, 234 (14.4%) people had a bachelor's or higher degree, and 354 (21.9%) people had no formal qualifications. The median income was $40,600, compared with $31,800 nationally. 312 people (19.3%) earned over $70,000 compared to 17.2% nationally. The employment status of those at least 15 was that 942 (58.1%) people were employed full-time, 273 (16.9%) were part-time, and 21 (1.3%) were unemployed.

== Education ==
Dipton School is a state full primary school for years 1 to 8 with a roll of 45 as of July 2026. The school was established in 1877.
