= Todd Barclay =

New Zealand former politician

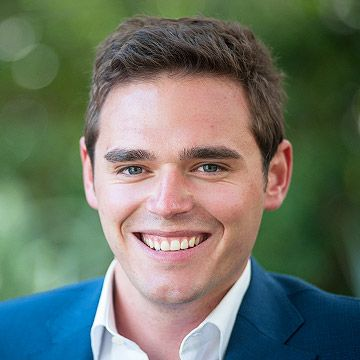

Member of the New Zealand Parliament for Clutha-Southland
- In office 20 September 2014 – 23 September 2017
- Preceded by: Bill English
- Succeeded by: Hamish Walker
- Majority: 13,583

Personal details
- Born: Todd Keith Barclay; 8 June 1990 (age 36) Dipton, New Zealand
- Party: National

Todd Keith Barclay (born 8 June 1990) is a former New Zealand politician. A member of the National Party, he was elected to the New Zealand House of Representatives in 2014 as the Member of Parliament (MP) for Clutha-Southland. In 2017, Barclay resigned from parliament in disgrace after a scandal involving secret recordings he made.

== Early life ==
Barclay was born in 1990 in Dipton, where his parents Maree and Paul Barclay operated the Four Square supermarket. The family moved to Gore, where Barclay attended Gore High School, before graduating from Victoria University of Wellington with a Bachelor of Commerce in Commercial Law.

Prior to his election, Barclay worked at Parliament for Bill English (the MP he later replaced), Gerry Brownlee and Hekia Parata before moving to Auckland and working for Philip Morris. Barclay has insisted that with regards to working for a tobacco company, his ethics are strong: "I don't smoke, I don't encourage smoking".

== Political career ==
New Zealand Parliament
Years	Term	Electorate	List	Party
2014–2017	51st	Clutha-Southland	54	National

Barclay won the election by a significant margin to Labour's Liz Craig, obtaining nearly 64% of the candidate votes. Barclay was the first New Zealand MP to be born in the 1990s and at the time of his election, at age 24 he was the youngest MP in the House of Representatives. He delivered his maiden statement on 22 October 2014, in which he explained that he wanted contribute to the portfolios of primary industries, education, trade, and tourism. He also spoke to Margaret Thatcher's views on "moral society."

During his term in Parliament, Barclay sat as a member of the primary production committee and education and science committee. He was deputy chair of the law and order committee from 2015 to 2017, and chaired his other two committees for several months in 2017.

On 10 April 2015 Barclay featured in news media for criticising supporters of current affairs television show Campbell Live which had been threatened with cancellation. He subsequently deleted his Twitter comment.

In November 2016, media reports indicated that Queenstown resident Simon Flood intended to challenge Barclay for selection as the National candidate for Clutha-Southland at the 2017 election. At a party meeting on 21 December 2016 to select the candidate for the Clutha-Southland electorate in 2017, Barclay won the selection over challenger Simon Flood.

== Clandestine recording scandal ==
On 9 February 2016, Glenys Dickson, a senior electorate agent for Barclay, resigned because of an "employment problem" between the two. Dickson, originally the electorate agent for Bill English from 1998 to 2014, became Barclay's agent in 2014 after he replaced Bill English as the MP for Clutha-Southland. The circumstances leading to her resignation were described as confidential. Later that month Stuart Davie, the Clutha-Southland chairman, became the third resignation of Barclay's staff in 2016, Barbara Swan being the first. Davie claimed it was "untenable" to stay on at present.

On 21 June 2017, after revelations that Barclay had made clandestine recordings of staff members he suspected of being critical of him, Barclay announced that he would not stand for re-election. Secretly recording a conversation that you are not party to is a crime in New Zealand. He subsequently left New Zealand and moved to London, later moving to Sydney and Saudi Arabia where he works as a consultant for KPMG.

New Zealand Parliament
Preceded by Bill English	Member of Parliament for Clutha-Southland; 2014–2017	Succeeded by Hamish Walker
Preceded by Jami-Lee Ross	Baby of the House; 2014–2017	Succeeded by Chlöe Swarbrick
