= Todd Stephenson =

New Zealand politician

Todd Stephenson MP
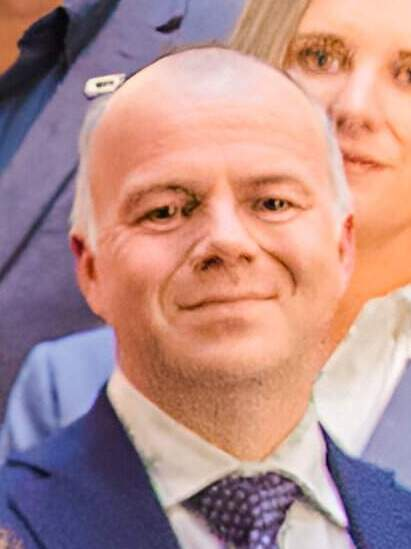
- Stephenson in 2023

Member of the New Zealand Parliament for ACT party list
- Incumbent
- Assumed office 14 October 2023

Personal details
- Born: Todd Michael Stephenson Lumsden, New Zealand
- Party: ACT New Zealand
- Spouse: Alex

Todd Michael Stephenson is a New Zealand lawyer and politician. He was elected to the New Zealand House of Representatives as a list MP for ACT New Zealand at the 2023 New Zealand general election.

His prior career was in the pharmaceutical industry.

== Early life ==
Stephenson was born in Lumsden and educated in Invercargill, attending James Hargest College and later gaining a law degree from the University of Otago. He worked in the pharmaceutical industry for the 17 years, including for the company Vertex Pharmaceuticals, which makes cystic fibrosis drug Trikafta.

== Political career ==
New Zealand Parliament
Years	Term	Electorate	List	Party
2023–2026	54th	List	4	ACT
2026–present	55th	List	6	ACT

Stephenson has been a member of ACT for nearly 30 years, since its formation, and formerly worked for ACT's former president Catherine Isaac. He was attracted to the party by its focus on "private enterprise and individual freedom". He campaigned for the party four times between 1996 and 2005, and was employed by the party from 1997 to 2000. He has been elected to the ACT party board twice.

=== 2023 general election ===
Stephenson contested Southland in the 2023 election. He was fourth on the national list. At the time of his selection he was living in Sydney, Australia. He subsequently moved to a house he already owned and rented out in Queenstown. During the campaign, Stephenson was interviewed by Jack Tame on Q+A on ACT's policy of an independent review of medicine-buying agency Pharmac. Stephenson said Pharmac needed to do a better job engaging with its stakeholders, and raised the possibility that treatment decisions should be made with a productivity focus in mind. Stephenson identified the cost of living as a particular issue for his electorate, with rents for workers in Queenstown being unaffordable.

=== First term, 2023–2026 ===
On election night, Stephenson received 2,807 votes in Southland, coming fourth behind National's Joseph Mooney, Labour's Simon McCallum and the Greens' Dave Kennedy. He was elected to Parliament ranked fourth on the ACT party list. In his first term, he is ACT spokesperson for arts, culture and heritage; corrections; finance; health; justice; police; the public service; and tourism, and also the party whip. In 2024 he was appointed a parliamentary private secretary to the Associate Minister of Health, David Seymour, advising Seymour on Pharmac and Medsafe.

The Parole (Mandatory Completion of Rehabilitative Programmes) Amendment Bill, a private member's bill in Stephenson's name, was introduced into Parliament on 15 February 2024. The bill proposes that offenders cannot be considered for parole by the New Zealand Parole Board if they have not completed a rehabilitative plan. The justice committee recommended amendments to the bill but could not agree to pass it. The original drafting had seen criticism from Parole Board chair Sir Ron Young and chief ombudsman Peter Boshier. Stephenson said he would seek to make further changes to the bill before its second reading.

In April 2024 Labour MP Rachel Boyack called for Stephenson's removal as ACT spokesperson for the arts, after an interview in which he revealed he doesn't believe taxpayers should fund the arts sector, and "took 20 minutes to think of a single New Zealand author and the only artistic experience he could think of was that he went to see the musical Hamilton in New York".

In late May 2024, Stephenson sold off his shares in health companies Chimeric Therapeutics, CSL Limited and Johnson & Johnson following allegations by Labour deputy leader Carmel Sepuloni that these shares created a conflict of interest in his role as Parliamentary Private Secretary to the associate health minister.

=== 2026 general election ===
During the 2026 New Zealand general election, Stephenson was ranked sixth on the ACT party list and contested the Southland electorate. Based on preliminary results, he came fourth place in Southland on 7 November with 2,199 votes. Stephenson was re-elected to Parliament on the ACT party list.

== Personal life ==
Stephenson lives in Queenstown with his partner Alex, who is Australian. Stephenson is gay and was founder of the J&J Open and Out Employee Resource Network in Australia, which aims to make sure company policies use language that "reflect[s] a diverse workforce".
