= Dipton =

Dipton can refer to:

- Dipton, County Durham, England
- Dipton, New Zealand
