= Clutha-Southland =

Coordinates: 45.6333°S 167.9167°E

Clutha-Southland electorate boundaries used since the 2008 election

Clutha-Southland was a parliamentary constituency returning one member to the New Zealand House of Representatives. The last MP for Clutha Southland was Hamish Walker of the National Party. He held the seat for one term, being elected at the 2017 general election and representing the electorate until the 2020 general election where he retired from Parliament, and the seat was replaced with the Southland electorate.

== Population centres ==
Clutha-Southland was promulgated as one of the original 65 MMP electorates, centred on Southland district and covering an area stretching from Fiordland across the far south of the South Island to the south Otago coast. Its largest population centres were Gore and Balclutha. In 2008, the seat of Otago was abolished and split between the Waitaki and Clutha-Southland electorates, and parts of Central Otago, primarily around Arrowtown, Queenstown and Roxburgh were also transferred to Clutha-Southland.

Clutha-Southland was the successor to the old Wallace, Clutha and Awarua constituencies. Its boundaries had changed at all three redistributions undertaken since its creation, as dwindling populations in both the old Clutha-Southland electorate and in the neighbouring Invercargill electorate have forced both seats northwards to ensure every electorate population stays within certain limits. This trend stopped in the 2013 redistribution, however, with both the Clutha-Southland and Invercargill electorates remaining unchanged in area, and then reversed in the 2020 redistribution, with the electorate gaining a large area around Alexandra from Waitaki, but losing the Balclutha area to the new Taieri electorate and Tuatapere to Invercargill. It was renamed Southland as it no longer included the Clutha area.

== History ==
Because of its largely rural nature, Clutha-Southland was one of the National Party's safest seats. Bill English, who is the former Prime Minister, held the seat from 1996 to 2014. English announced in January 2014 that he would retire as the electorate MP at the 2014 general election, becoming a list MP only.

Todd Barclay won the 2014 election by a significant margin over Labour's Liz Craig, obtaining nearly 64% of the candidate votes. Barclay became at that time the youngest MP in the House of Representatives. In 2017, he announced he would not stand for re-election at the 2017 election, after revealing he had secretly recorded staff in his office without their consent. The seat was won at the election by Hamish Walker, retaining it for the National Party. Similarly, in 2020, Walker admitted leaking sensitive private patient details about COVID-19 patients, and subsequently announced that he would not stand for re-election during the 2020 New Zealand general election.

In April 2020, the Electoral Commission announced that Clutha-Southland would have its borders substantially changed and that it would be renamed to the Southland electorate. As part of the changes, the Alexandra and the Clyde area would be transferred from Waitaki to Southland while South Otago was transferred to the newly created Taieri electorate. The Invercargill electorate also expanded into western Southland.

== Members of Parliament for Clutha-Southland ==
The electorate has been represented by three members of parliament so far.

Key National NZ First

Election	Winner
1996 election	Bill English
1999 election	Bill English
2002 election	Bill English
2005 election	Bill English
2008 election	Bill English
2011 election	Bill English
2014 election	Todd Barclay
2017 election	Hamish Walker
(Electorate abolished in 2020; see Southland)

=== List MPs ===
Members of Parliament elected from party lists in elections where that person also unsuccessfully contested the electorate. Unless otherwise stated, all MPs terms began and ended at general elections.

Election	Winner
2005	Lesley Soper (Note: Soper entered Parliament on 4 April 2005 following Jonathan Hunt's resignation.)
2017 election	Mark Patterson

== Election results ==
=== 2017 election ===
2017 general election: Clutha-Southland
Notes:	Blue background denotes the winner of the electorate vote. Pink background denotes a candidate elected from their party list. Yellow background denotes an electorate win by a list member, or other incumbent. A ✓ or ✗ denotes status of any incumbent, win or lose respectively.						
Party	Candidate	Votes	%	±%	Party votes	%	±%
National	Hamish Walker	21,819	59.89	−4.18	21,915	59.26	−4.12
Labour	Cherie Chapman	7,465	20.49	+0.66	8,960	24.22	+9.51
NZ First	Mark Patterson	3,485	9.57	—	2,900	7.84	+1.60
Green	Rachael Goldsmith	2,650	7.27	+0.15	1,654	4.47	−3.26
Ban 1080	Brian Adams	674	1.85	−0.87	144	0.39	−0.39
Independent	Joe Stringer	200	0.55	–			
Conservative	Lachie Ashton	141	0.39	−3.78	75	0.20	−4.84
Opportunities					894	2.42	—
ACT					141	0.38	+0.02
Legalise Cannabis					118	0.32	−0.22
Māori Party					95	0.26	−0.07
United Future					29	0.07	−0.13
Outdoors					26	0.07	—
People's Party					13	0.04	—
Democrats					10	0.03	−0.08
Internet					5	0.01	−0.45 (Note: 2017 Internet Party swing is relative to the votes for Internet-Mana in 2014; it shared a party list with Mana Party in the 2014 election)
Mana Party					4	0.01	−0.45 (Note: 2017 Mana Party swing is relative to the votes for Internet-Mana in 2014; it shared a party list with the Internet Party in the 2014 election)
Informal votes		359			171		
Total valid votes		36,434			36,983		
Turnout		37,154					
National hold	Majority	14,354	39.40	−4.83			

=== 2014 election ===
2014 general election: Clutha-Southland
Notes:	Blue background denotes the winner of the electorate vote. Pink background denotes a candidate elected from their party list. Yellow background denotes an electorate win by a list member, or other incumbent. A ✓ or ✗ denotes status of any incumbent, win or lose respectively.						
Party	Candidate	Votes	%	±%	Party votes	%	±%
National	Todd Barclay	21,561	64.06	−4.76	21,694	63.37	+0.48
Labour	Liz Craig	6,675	19.83	+3.06	5,036	14.71	−1.50
Green	Rachael Goldsmith	2,398	7.13	−1.35	2,647	7.73	−0.91
Conservative	Lachie Ashton	1,403	4.17	+1.63	1,726	5.04	+1.93
Ban 1080	James Veint	915	2.71	—	268	0.78	—
ACT	Don Nicolson	447	1.33	−1.23	122	0.36	−1.48
Independent Coalition	Karl Barkley	168	0.50	—	32	0.09	—
Democrats	Jason Jobsis	88	0.26	−0.15	36	0.11	−0.13
NZ First					2,135	6.23	+1.35
Legalise Cannabis					184	0.54	−0.12
Internet Mana					158	0.46	+0.31 (Note: 2014 Internet Mana swing is relative to the votes for Mana in 2011; it shared a party list with Internet in the 2014 election.)
Māori Party					113	0.33	−0.10
United Future					68	0.20	−0.61
Civilian					10	0.03	—
Focus					0	0.00	—
Informal votes		370			107		
Total valid votes		34,025			34,336		
Turnout		34,443	78.51	+4.68			
National hold	Majority	14,886	44.23	−7.83			

=== 2011 election ===
2011 general election: Clutha-Southland
Notes:	Blue background denotes the winner of the electorate vote. Pink background denotes a candidate elected from their party list. Yellow background denotes an electorate win by a list member, or other incumbent. A ✓ or ✗ denotes status of any incumbent, win or lose respectively.						
Party	Candidate	Votes	%	±%	Party votes	%	±%
National	✓ Bill English	21,375	68.83	+0.96	20,020	62.89	+3.03
Labour	Tat Loo	5,207	16.77	−4.69	5,160	16.21	−7.73
Green	Rachael Goldsmith	2,633	8.48	+1.57	2,751	8.64	+3.54
ACT	Don Nicolson	796	2.56	+0.79	583	1.83	−2.06
Conservative	Ross Calverley	787	2.53	+2.53	992	3.12	+3.12
Sovereignty Party	Tony Corbett	130	0.42	+0.42			
Democrats	Robert Mills	128	0.41	+0.41	75	0.24	+0.18
NZ First					1,556	4.89	+2.02
United Future					259	0.81	+0.06
Legalise Cannabis					210	0.66	+0.27
Māori Party					136	0.43	+0.01
Mana					48	0.15	+0.15
Libertarianz					24	0.08	+0.03
Alliance					17	0.05	−0.13
Informal votes		810			209		
Total valid votes		31,056			31,831		
National hold	Majority	16,168	52.06	+5.65			

Electorate (as at 26 November 2011): 43,395

=== 2008 election ===
2008 general election: Clutha-Southland
Notes:	Blue background denotes the winner of the electorate vote. Pink background denotes a candidate elected from their party list. Yellow background denotes an electorate win by a list member, or other incumbent. A ✓ or ✗ denotes status of any incumbent, win or lose respectively.						
Party	Candidate	Votes	%	±%	Party votes	%	±%
National	✓ Bill English	22,631	67.87	+1.39	20,235	59.87	+2.73
Labour	Don Pryde	7,156	21.46	−1.74	8,091	23.94	−4.76
Green	Tim Gow	2,304	6.91	+4.23	1,726	5.11	+2.74
ACT	Roly Henderson	590	1.77	+0.18	1,315	3.89	+1.98
Family Party	Paul Tankard	515	1.54	+1.54	193	0.57	+0.57
Alliance	Marvin Hubbard	149	0.45	+0.45	63	0.19	+0.11
NZ First					968	2.86	−1.70
Bill and Ben					259	0.77	+0.77
United Future					254	0.75	−2.64
Progressive					226	0.67	−0.09
Māori Party					141	0.42	−0.21
Legalise Cannabis					131	0.39	+0.13
Kiwi					131	0.39	+0.39
Democrats					18	0.05	−0.03
Workers Party					18	0.05	+0.05
Libertarianz					16	0.05	−0.02
Pacific					8	0.02	+0.02
RAM					4	0.01	+0.01
RONZ					2	0.01	-0.004
Informal votes		354			142		
Total valid votes		33,345			33,799		
National hold	Majority	15,475	46.41	+3.14			

=== 2005 election ===
2005 general election: Clutha-Southland
Notes:	Blue background denotes the winner of the electorate vote. Pink background denotes a candidate elected from their party list. Yellow background denotes an electorate win by a list member, or other incumbent. A ✓ or ✗ denotes status of any incumbent, win or lose respectively.						
Party	Candidate	Votes	%	±%	Party votes	%	±%
National	✓ Bill English	20,020	66.48	+10.83	17,334	57.14	+16.45
Labour	David Talbot	6,988	23.20		8,705	28.70	−8.62
NZ First	Dave Mackie	999	3.32	−0.33	1,386	4.57	−2.20
Green	Robert Guyton	808	2.68		719	2.37	−1.08
United Future	Joy Lietze	701	2.33	−0.23	1,028	3.39	−3.21
ACT	John Fraser	479	1.59		579	1.91	−3.20
Independent	David Webber	121	0.40	+0.15			
Progressive					230	0.76	−0.26
Destiny					99	0.33	
Legalise Cannabis					79	0.26	−0.24
Māori Party					63	0.21	
Democrats					26	0.09	
Christian Heritage					24	0.08	−1.07
Alliance					23	0.08	−0.69
99 MP					13	0.04	
Family Rights					9	0.03	
Libertarianz					7	0.02	
One NZ					6	0.02	−0.02
RONZ					3	0.01	
Direct Democracy					2	0.01	
Informal votes		211			150		
Total valid votes		30,116			30,335		
National hold	Majority	13,032	43.28	+19.84			

=== 2002 election ===
2002 general election: Clutha-Southland
Notes:	Blue background denotes the winner of the electorate vote. Pink background denotes a candidate elected from their party list. Yellow background denotes an electorate win by a list member, or other incumbent. A ✓ or ✗ denotes status of any incumbent, win or lose respectively.						
Party	Candidate	Votes	%	±%	Party votes	%	±%
National	✓ Bill English	16,159	55.65	+4.43	11,881	40.69	−1.36
Labour	Lesley Soper	9,351	32.21	+1.98	9,290	31.82	+1.85
NZ First	Dave Mackie	1,059	3.65	−0.06	1,977	6.77	+3.37
United Future	Joy Lietze	742	2.56		1,928	6.60	
Green	Dayle Belcher	605	2.08		1,006	3.45	+0.40
ACT	Roly Henderson	396	1.36		1,491	5.11	−2.27
Christian Heritage	Grant Bradfield	365	1.26	−2.37	335	1.15	−2.53
Progressive	Roger White*	168	0.58	−2.86	299	1.02	
Alliance	Jim Flynn	117	0.40		224	0.77	−5.38
Independent	David Webber	73	0.25	−0.08			
ORNZ					602	2.06	
Legalise Cannabis					147	0.50	−0.46
One NZ					13	0.04	−0.01
Mana Māori					2	0.01	−0.01
NMP					1	0.00	0.00
Informal votes		185			166		
Total valid votes		29,035			29,196		
National hold	Majority	6,808	23.44	+2.45			

*Percentage change calculation based on percent as Alliance candidate in 1999 election.

=== 1999 election ===
1999 general election: Clutha-Southland
Notes:	Blue background denotes the winner of the electorate vote. Pink background denotes a candidate elected from their party list. Yellow background denotes an electorate win by a list member, or other incumbent. A ✓ or ✗ denotes status of any incumbent, win or lose respectively.						
Party	Candidate	Votes	%	±%	Party votes	%	±%
National	✓ Bill English	15,619	51.22	+4.13	12,882	42.05	−0.69
Labour	Lesley Soper	9,218	30.23	+11.98	9,182	29.97	+10.72
NZ First	Dave Mackie	1,131	3.71		1,043	3.40	−11.57
Christian Heritage	Grant Bradfield	1,108	3.63		1,128	3.68	
Alliance	Roger White	1,049	3.44		1,883	6.15	−1.30
ACT	John Morrison	945	3.10		2,260	7.38	+1.34
Green	Tim Gow	854	2.80		935	3.05	
South Island	Pat McCarrigan	469	1.54		421	1.37	
Independent	David Webber	102	0.33				
Legalise Cannabis					293	0.96	−0.28
Christian Democrats					243	0.79	
United NZ					112	0.37	−0.21
Libertarianz					87	0.28	+0.25
McGillicuddy Serious					65	0.21	−0.21
Animals First					57	0.19	+0.07
One NZ					15	0.05	
Natural Law					8	0.03	−0.05
Mauri Pacific					6	0.02	
Mana Māori					5	0.02	+0.01
The People's Choice					5	0.02	
Freedom Movement					4	0.01	
Republican					3	0.01	
NMP					0	0.00	
Informal votes		481			339		
Total valid votes		30,495			30,637		
National hold	Majority	6,401	20.99	−7.85			

=== 1996 election ===
1996 general election: Clutha-Southland
Notes:	Blue background denotes the winner of the electorate vote. Pink background denotes a candidate elected from their party list. Yellow background denotes an electorate win by a list member, or other incumbent. A ✓ or ✗ denotes status of any incumbent, win or lose respectively.						
Party	Candidate	Votes	%	±%	Party votes	%	±%
National	Bill English	14,764	47.09		13,449	42.74	
Labour	Lesley Soper	5,721	18.25		6,058	19.25	
NZ First	Alan Wise	5,075	16.19		4,709	14.97	
Alliance	Tracey Hicks	2,326	7.42		2,345	7.45	
ACT	Peter Snow	2,049	6.54		1,901	6.04	
Christian Coalition	Russell Zwies	1,060	3.38		2,147	6.82	
McGillicuddy Serious	Robyn West	306	0.98		133	0.42	
Natural Law	Gilbert Urquhart	50	0.16		24	0.08	
Legalise Cannabis					390	1.24	
United NZ					181	0.58	
Animals First					37	0.12	
Progressive Green					33	0.10	
Green Society					15	0.05	
Conservatives					14	0.04	
Superannuitants & Youth					11	0.03	
Libertarianz					10	0.03	
Advance New Zealand					2	0.01	
Asia Pacific United					2	0.01	
Ethnic Minority Party					2	0.01	
Mana Māori					2	0.01	
Te Tawharau					0	0.00	
Informal votes		202			88		
Total valid votes		31,351			31,465		
National win new seat	Majority	9,043	28.84				
