= Mark Billcliff =

New Zealand cricketer (born 1977)

Personal information
- Full name: Mark Robert Billcliff
- Born: 21 April 1977 (age 49); Dunedin, New Zealand
- Batting: Right-handed
- Bowling: Right-arm fast-medium
- Relatives: Sarah Dowie (spouse; separated in 2018); Ian Billcliff (brother)

Domestic team information
- Years: Team
- 1998/99: Otago
- Source: ESPNcricinfo, 5 May 2016

Mark Robert Billcliff (born 21 April 1977) is a New Zealand former cricketer. He played two first-class matches for Otago during the 1998–99 season.

Billcliff was born at Dunedin in 1977 and educated at Otago Boys' High School in the city. He was married to Sarah Dowie, a Member of Parliament, but they separated in 2018. His brother is cricketer Ian Billcliff, who played internationally for Canada.
