= Sarah Dowie =

New Zealand politician

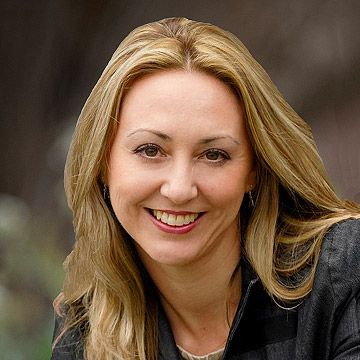

Member of the New Zealand Parliament for Invercargill
- In office 20 September 2014 – 17 October 2020
- Preceded by: Eric Roy
- Succeeded by: Penny Simmonds
- Majority: 5,579

Personal details
- Born: Sarah Maree Dowie; 1974 (age 51–52)
- Party: National
- Spouse: Mark Billcliff (separated in 2018)
- Children: 2
- Profession: Lawyer
- Website: sarahdowie.national.org.nz

Sarah Maree Dowie (born 1974) is a New Zealand former politician of the National Party. She was the Member of Parliament for Invercargill from 2014 to 2020.

== Early life and career ==
Dowie's parents, Ann and Alan Dowie, were both police officers. At age 15 in 1990, she was a member of a semi-professional dance group that performed in the Soviet Union. Before her election to Parliament, she worked as a lawyer.

Dowie attended the University of Otago, studying law and ecology. After graduating, Dowie worked for the law firm Macalisters and later the Department of Conservation. Dowie joined the National Party and was affiliated with their "Blue Greens" environmentalist faction.

== Member of Parliament ==
New Zealand Parliament
| Years | Term | Electorate | List | Party |
|---|---|---|---|---|
| 2014–2017 | 51st | Invercargill | 57 | National |
| 2017–2020 | 52nd | Invercargill | 41 | National |

=== Political career ===
Dowie was selected by the National Party to replace retiring MP Eric Roy as the party's Invercargill for the 2014 election. At the time, she was described in the media as "relatively unknown" but was able to retain to retain the seat for National with a large margin over Labour's Lesley Soper. Dowie was returned again in 2017 with a slightly reduced margin over new Labour candidate Liz Craig and sitting New Zealand First list MP Ria Bond.

During her first term, Dowie served on a range of select committees. She was deputy chairperson of the Government Administration committee, deputy chairperson of the Local Government and Environment committee and chairperson of the Justice and Electoral committee.

In Dowie's second term, National was in Opposition. She was appointed to Simon Bridges' shadow cabinet as conservation spokesperson and one of only a few members who had not been a minister in the previous Government. In this role she campaigned against Conservation Minister Eugenie Sage's proposed tahr cull, supported recreational whitebaiting, and promoted a member's bill aimed at regulating the shark cage diving industry. She also opposed the Labour government's plans to merge the country's polytechnics into a single entity, Te Pūkenga – New Zealand Institute of Skills and Technology.

=== Jami-Lee Ross scandal and retirement ===
Botany MP Jami-Lee Ross split from National in October 2018. Shortly after this Newsroom reported that four women claimed to have been sexually harassed by Ross and Ross revealed in a radio interview that he had been having an affair with two women including a fellow MP. On 25 January 2019, that MP was revealed to be Dowie. Ross had disclosed her identity to news media in October 2018, but they chose not to name her until it was learned that a police investigation had been launched into a text message Dowie sent to Ross which included the words “You deserve to die“. However, the police decided that no further action was needed.

In 2019 Dowie was re-selected unopposed as National's Invercargill candidate, but in February 2020 announced her decision not to stand for re-election. Her change of heart was attributed to the fallout from the Ross scandal. Southern Institute of Technology chief executive Penny Simmonds was announced as the replacement candidate.

Dowie delivered her valedictory speech on 29 July 2020. She criticised the news media for the way it portrayed her when the news broke of her relationship with Ross and accused journalists and political commentators of inaccurate reporting and “downright lies”. She described Ross as a “predator” who was able to “manipulate the media for his agenda” and said when the “media is directly party to it, it is the media fraternity that needs to audit themselves as to their ethics and their conscious peddling of sexism and patriarchy”. Dowie said if it takes for her to be “New Zealand’s ‘scarlet woman’ to highlight that situation, “then so be it”, and that New Zealand has a long way to go with how it views women.

Her speech was met with a standing ovation by MPs throughout the debating chamber. Dowie gave a number of high-profile interviews with news media following the announcement of her retirement from Parliament, including with New Zealand Herald senior writer David Fisher, Stuff’s Andrea Vance, and Newsroom’s Melanie Reid. In these interviews she described Ross as psychologically, sexually and emotionally abusive and called for an overhaul of the way in which women MPs are treated.

Dowie also wrote an op-ed for Newsroom providing advice to other women caught in abusive relationships including breaking off contact with the abuser and reaching out to and confiding in friends.

== Post-Parliamentary career ==
In exit interviews, Dowie stated her intention to work as a consultant championing Southland and shepherding policy through central and local government.

In January 2021 she was announced as the chief executive of Able Charitable Trust, a mental health charity.

== Personal life ==
Sarah Dowie is married to Mark Billcliff, a former first class cricketer for Otago, but it is understood they have separated. Dowie has two young children.

New Zealand Parliament
| Preceded by Eric Roy | Member of Parliament for Invercargill; 2014–2020 | Succeeded by Penny Simmonds |
