= Hamish Walker =

New Zealand politician

Member of the New Zealand Parliament for Clutha-Southland
- In office 23 September 2017 – 17 October 2020
- Preceded by: Todd Barclay
- Succeeded by: Joseph Mooney (Southland electorate)
- Majority: 14,354

Personal details
- Born: 1985 (age 40–41) Dunedin, New Zealand
- Party: National

Hamish Richard Walker (born 1985) is a New Zealand former politician and former Member of Parliament in the House of Representatives for the National Party.

== Early life ==
Walker was born and raised in Dunedin where he attended Māori Hill Primary School and John McGlashan College. At age 14, he was diagnosed with diabetes.

== Political career ==
At the 2014 general election, Walker stood in Dunedin South, placing second in the seat.

=== Member of parliament ===
New Zealand Parliament
Years	Term	Electorate	List	Party
2017–2020	52nd	Clutha-Southland	68	National

At the 2017 general election, Walker stood in the electorate of Clutha-Southland. The Clutha-Southland electorate has been held since its creation in 1996 by the National Party. Walker was selected as a last minute candidate to replace Todd Barclay, who had resigned due to an employment scandal. Walker won Clutha-Southland, defeating Labour candidate Cherie Joy Chapman by a margin of 14,354 votes.

During his first term, Walker lobbied for the preservation of maternity services in Lumsden and greater support for Queenstown businesses affected by the COVID-19 pandemic in New Zealand. Walker was also a member of Parliament's primary production select committee and served as the party's associate agriculture spokesperson between 12 March 2018 and 25 May 2020. Between 25 May and 7 July 2020, Walker served as National's spokesperson on forestry and land information, and associate spokesperson on tourism.

In February 2020, Walker admitted to misleading the public through posting a fake social media post falsely indicating he had participated in a door knocking campaign in the small Southland town of Mataura.

On 2 July 2020, Walker again attracted media attention when he issued a press release criticising the Labour-led coalition government for not consulting residents of Dunedin, Queenstown, and Invercargill about hosting quarantine facilities for 11,000 returnees from India, Pakistan and South Korea. Walker's remarks were criticised as racist by Minister of Housing Megan Woods for singling out returnees from those countries. Walker defended his remarks, asserting that charges of racism were an attempt to deflect from the Government's failings. Prime Minister Jacinda Ardern criticised Walker's remarks as inappropriate while Mayor of Dunedin Aaron Hawkins described Walker's remarks as "dog whistling." On 3 July 2020, Walker was reprimanded by National Party leader Todd Muller, who expressed disappointment and concern about his press statement. According to Stuff, Walker's statements had not been approved by the National Party's leadership.

On 7 July 2020 Walker admitted leaking sensitive medical information (private patient details) to media outlets about COVID-19 patients and was stripped of his portfolios. That same day, former National Party president Michelle Boag admitted passing COVID-19 patient details to Walker and resigned from her position as chief executive of the Auckland Rescue Helicopter Trust. On 8 July, National leader Todd Muller told the media that he had written to the party board asking them to remove Walker from the party. That same day Walker announced that he would not be standing for re-election in the Southland electorate during the 2020 New Zealand general election.

On 30 July 2020, a report published by former solicitor general Michael Heron, QC, concluded Walker was responsible for the unauthorised disclosure of sensitive information, his motivations were political and his actions were not justified or reasonable.

== Post-political career ==
Following his retirement from politics, Walker found work as a real estate salesman at the Harcourts real estate company in Queenstown. Walker later finished working at Harcourts and launched a new real estate company in Queenstown called Premium Real Estate Queenstown, which has since closed down.

== Personal life ==
Hamish Walker is of Scottish New Zealand heritage and his family has roots in the South Island town of Balclutha. Walker's wife Penny Tipu is of Māori descent. The couple have a cat named Monty. On 1 January 2019, Walker reportedly saved a distressed man at the Lake Hāwea dam.

New Zealand Parliament
Preceded by Todd Barclay	Member of Parliament for Clutha-Southland; 2017–2020	Succeeded by Constituency abolished
