= 1Law4All Party =

- Founded: June 2013
- Colours: Green

Website
- 1law4all.kiwi.nz

1Law4All was a registered political party in New Zealand. The party was launched in June 2013 and was temporarily led by Tom Johnson. The party supported removing references to the Treaty of Waitangi from legislation, abolition of the Waitangi Tribunal and Māori electorates, repeal of the Marine and Coastal Area (Takutai Moana) Act 2011, and withdrawal of New Zealand from the UN Declaration on the Rights of Indigenous Peoples. The party never contested an election and was deregistered in May 2015.

== History ==
Originally the party made reference to Northland farmer Allan Titford as one reason for its policies, mentioning claims that he had been forced off his farm by a campaign of vandalism, government malfeasance, and arson by local Maori. When Titford was convicted of rape and arson charges, the party amended its web site by removing reference to him.

The Party held its inaugural Annual General Meeting in Napier, on 25 May 2014, at which members elected a board of directors. The meeting venue was full (approx 120 people) and was preceded by a lecture by David Round, a law lecturer from Canterbury University, New Zealand. Members present were told that the Party had applied to be a registered political party and hoped to stand candidates in the September 2014 General Election.

On 14 June 2014, the Electoral Commission announced that an application had been submitted for registration of the party and its logo. The party was registered on 24 July.

Shortly before the end of candidate nominations for the 2014 election, a post was made to the party's Facebook page indicating that it would not be standing any candidates. According to the message, the resignation of four out of five board members (described by the author of the post as "a deliberate act of sabotage") prevented the party from approving a candidate list before the official deadline. On 5 May 2015, the party's registration with the electoral commission was cancelled at the party's request.

Prior to the 2017 general election, 1Law4All distributed pamphlets calling for the dissolution of the Waitangi Tribunal and advertising a book which rejects 'race-separatism'. Don Brash, former leader of the New Zealand National Party, authored a chapter in the advertised book but denied knowledge of the pamphlet. 1Law4All applied for broadcasting funding prior to this election but was not eligible due to being unregistered.

In April 2019 1Law4All again distributed pamphlets with similar messaging, but was ordered to cease by the Advertising Standards Authority as it was likely to cause 'serious offence'.

== See also ==
- Don Brash
- Orewa Speech
- One New Zealand Party (1999–2006)
- Hobson's Pledge (2016–present)
