= 2014 New Zealand general election =

General election in New Zealand

- 20 September 2014

All 121 seats in the House of Representatives, including one overhang seat. 61 seats needed for a majority
- Opinion polls
- Registered: 3,140,417
- Turnout: 2,446,279; 77.90% (▲3.69%)
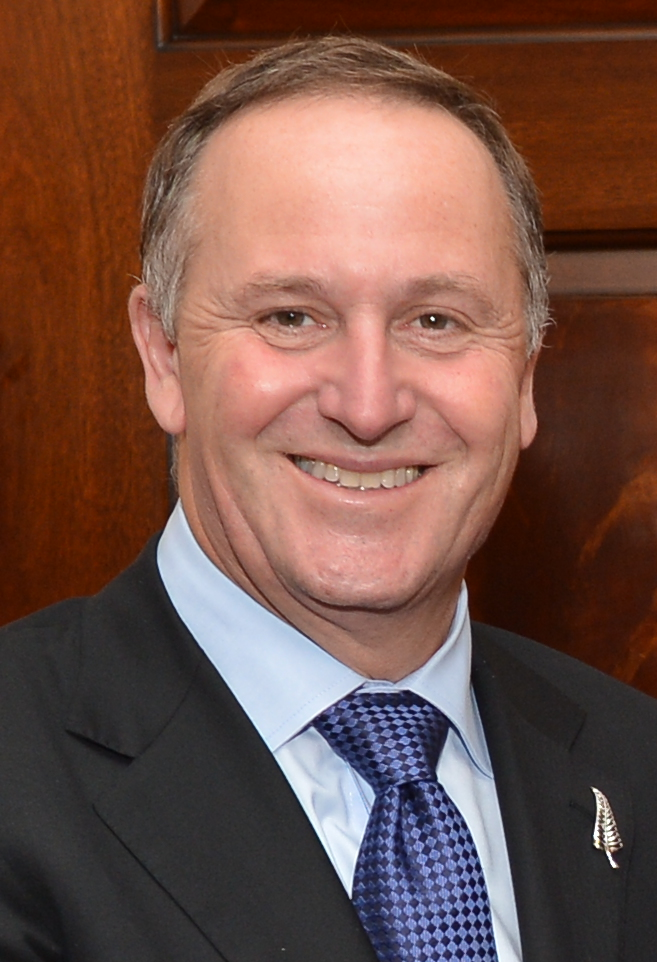

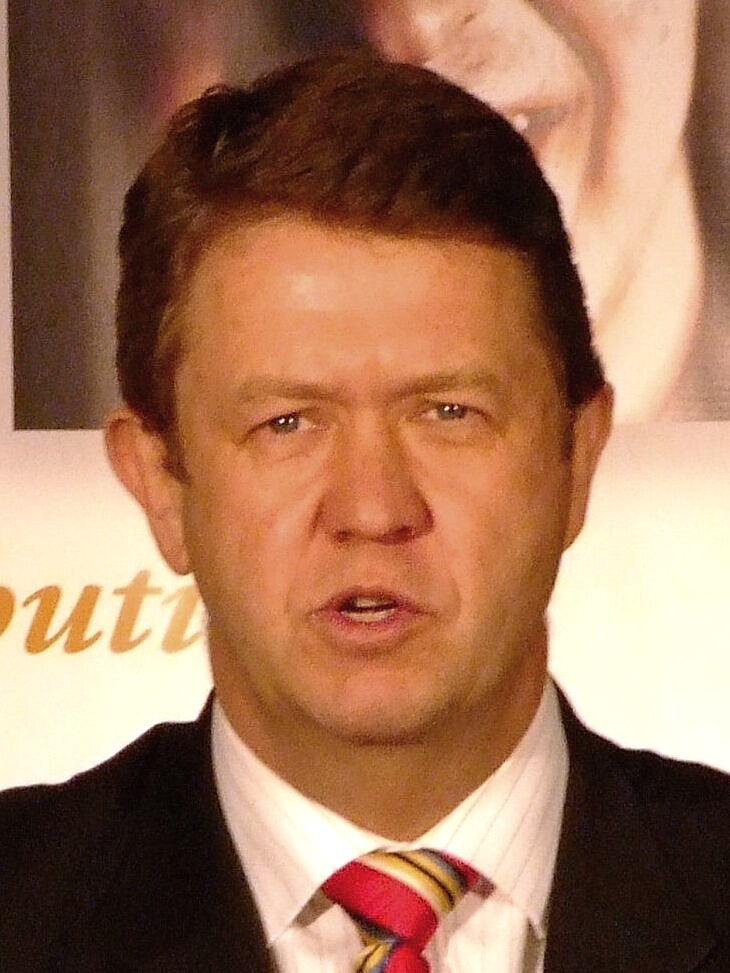

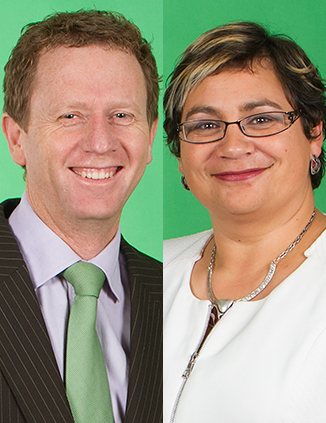

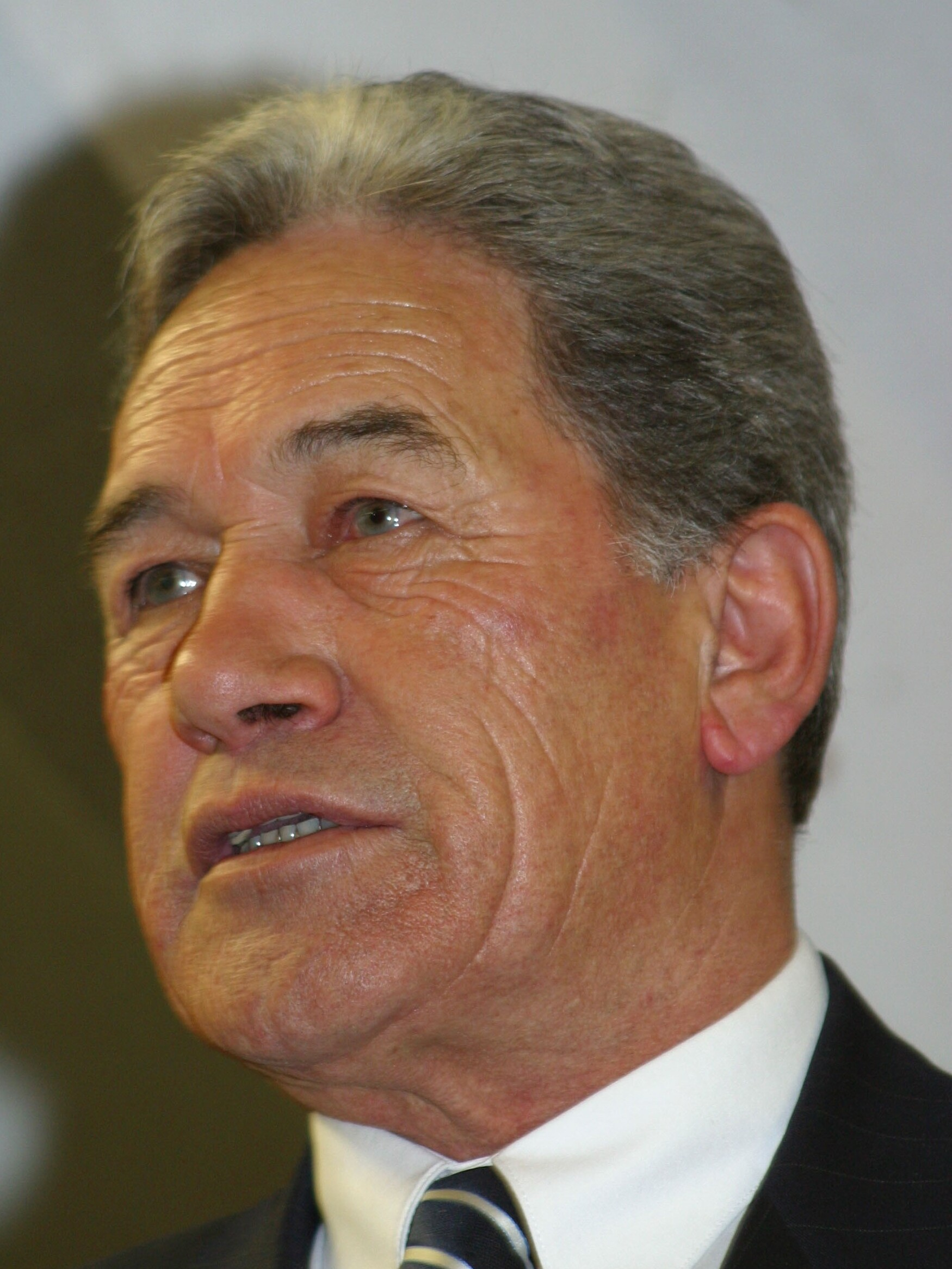

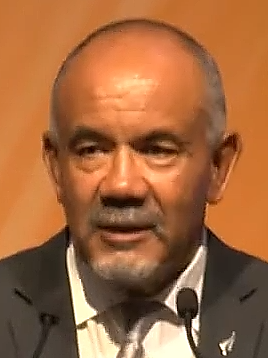

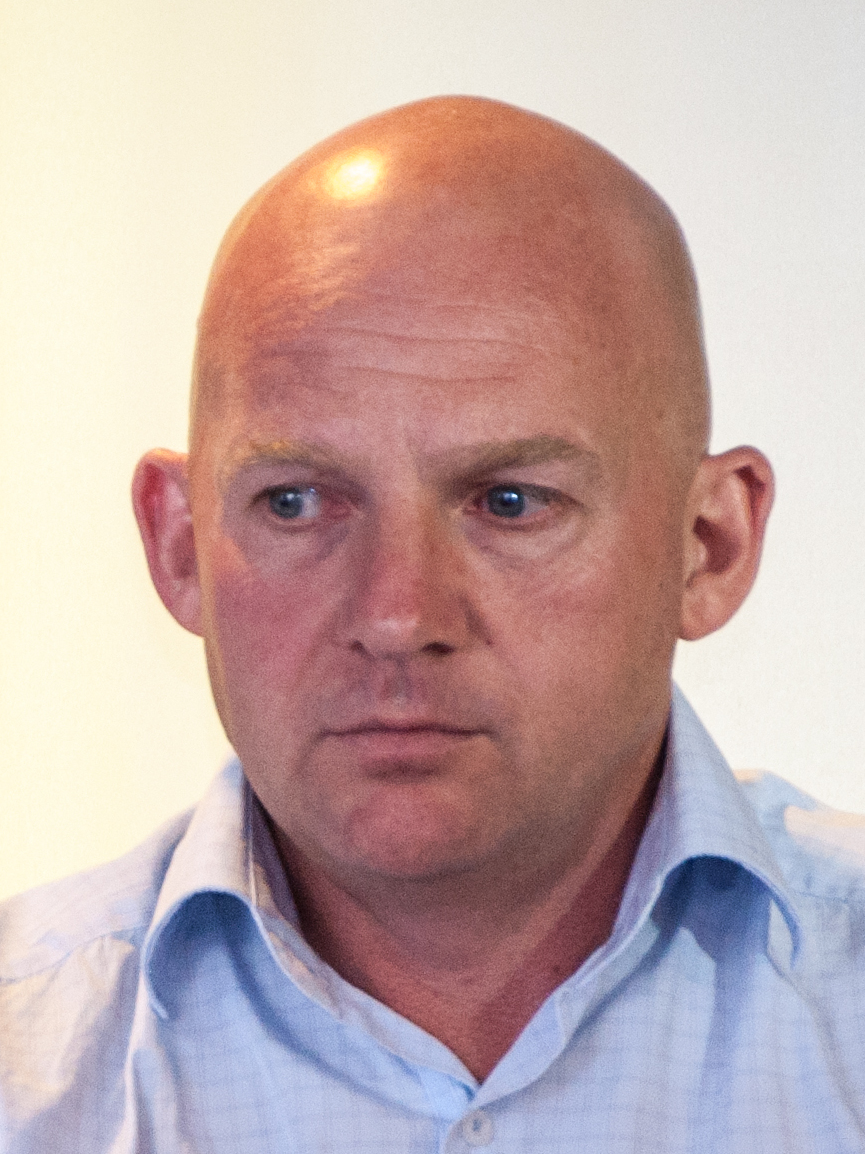

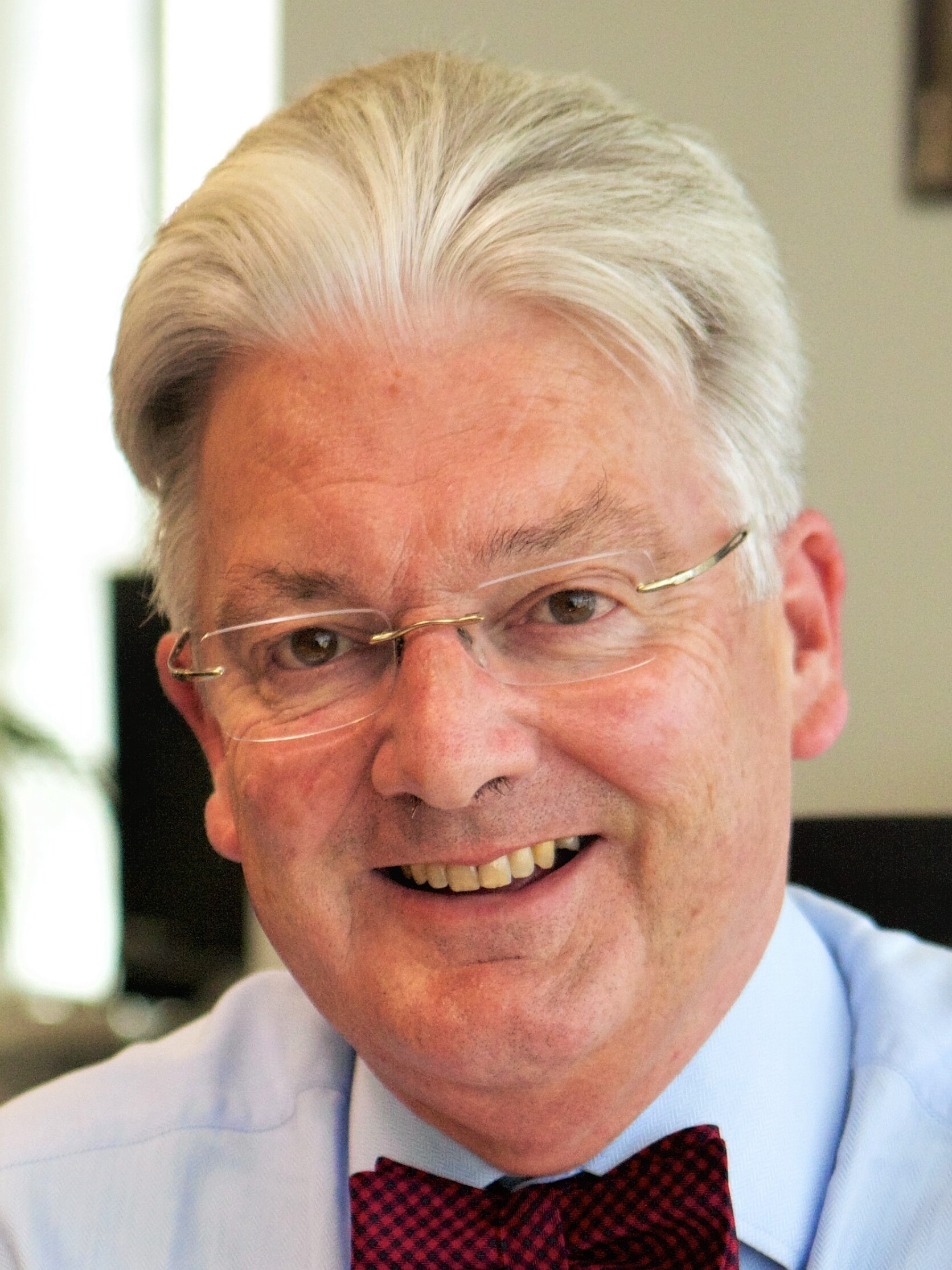

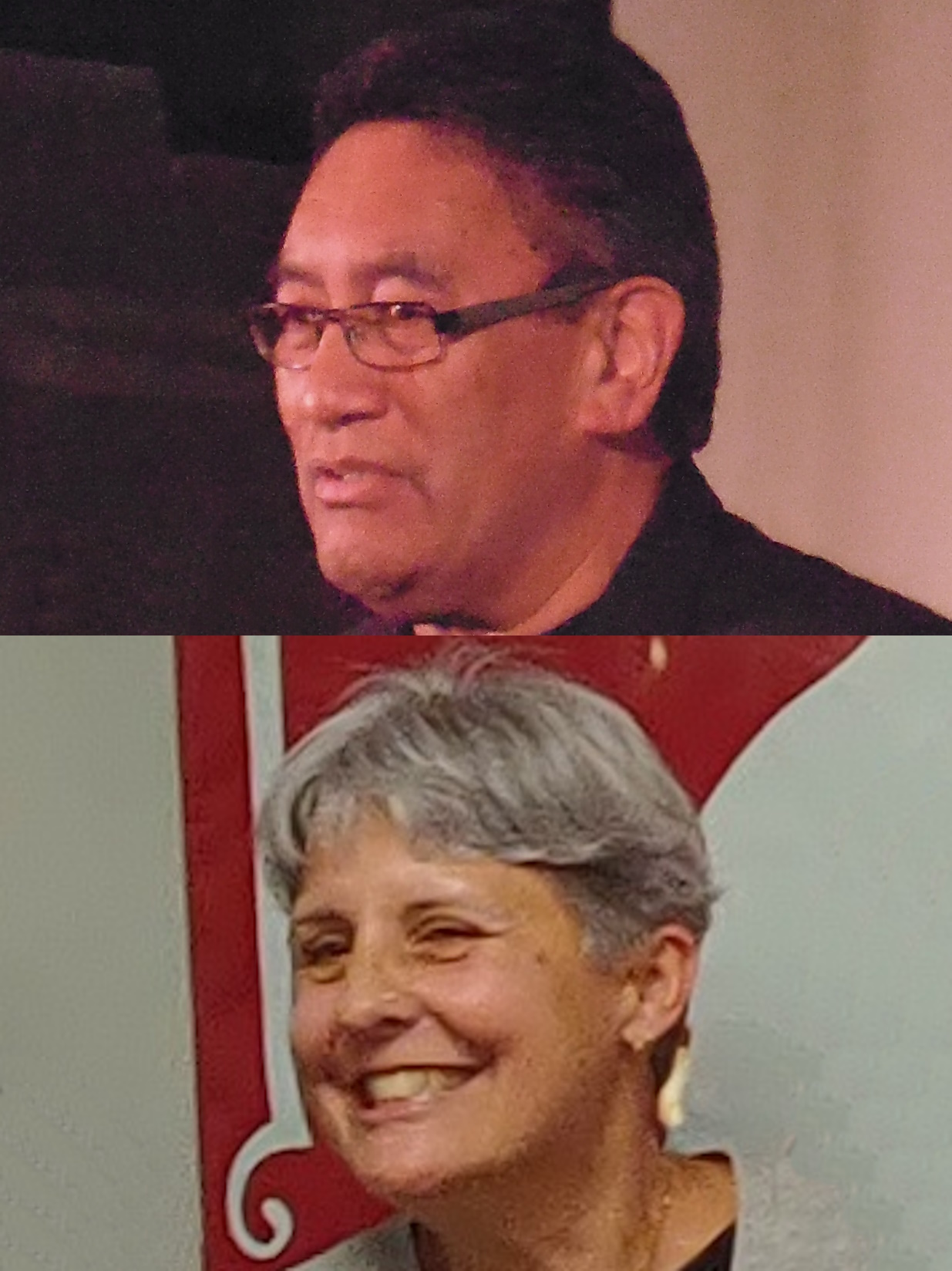
	First party	Second party	Third party
Leader	John Key	David Cunliffe	Russel Norman; Metiria Turei
Party	National	Labour	Green
Leader since	27 November 2006	15 September 2013	3 June 2006; 30 May 2009
Leader's seat	Helensville	New Lynn	List; List
Last election	59 seats, 47.31%	34 seats, 27.48%	14 seats, 11.06%
Seats before	59	34	14
Seats won	60	32	14
Seat change	▲1	▼2	Steady
Party vote	1,131,501	604,534	257,356
Percentage	47.04%	25.13%	10.70%
Swing	▼0.28 pp	▼2.35 pp	▼0.36 pp
	Fourth party	Fifth party	Sixth party
Leader	Winston Peters	Te Ururoa Flavell	Jamie Whyte
Party	NZ First	Māori Party	ACT
Leader since	18 July 1993	13 July 2013	2 February 2014
Leader's seat	List	Waiariki	Ran in Pakuranga (lost)
Last election	8 seats, 6.59%	3 seats, 1.43%	1 seat, 1.07%
Seats before	7	3	1
Seats won	11	2	1
Seat change	▲3	▼1	Steady
Party vote	208,300	31,850	16,689
Percentage	8.66%	1.32%	0.69%
Swing	▲2.06 pp	▼0.11 pp	▼0.37 pp
	Seventh party	Eighth party
Leader	Peter Dunne	Hone Harawira; Laila Harré
Party	United Future	Internet Mana
Leader since	16 November 2000	2014
Leader's seat	Ōhariu	Te Tai Tokerau (lost seat); Ran in Helensville (lost)
Last election	1 seat, 0.60%	1 seat, 1.08% (Note: For constituent Mana Party only)
Seats before	1	1
Seats won	1	0
Seat change	Steady	▼1
Party vote	5,286	34,095
Percentage	0.22%	1.42%
Swing	▼0.38 pp	▲0.34 pp
- Results by electorate, shaded by winning margin
Prime Minister and coalition before election
John Key (National)
National (C&S: Māori, ACT, United Future)
Subsequent Prime Minister and coalition
John Key (National)
National (C&S: Māori, ACT, United Future)

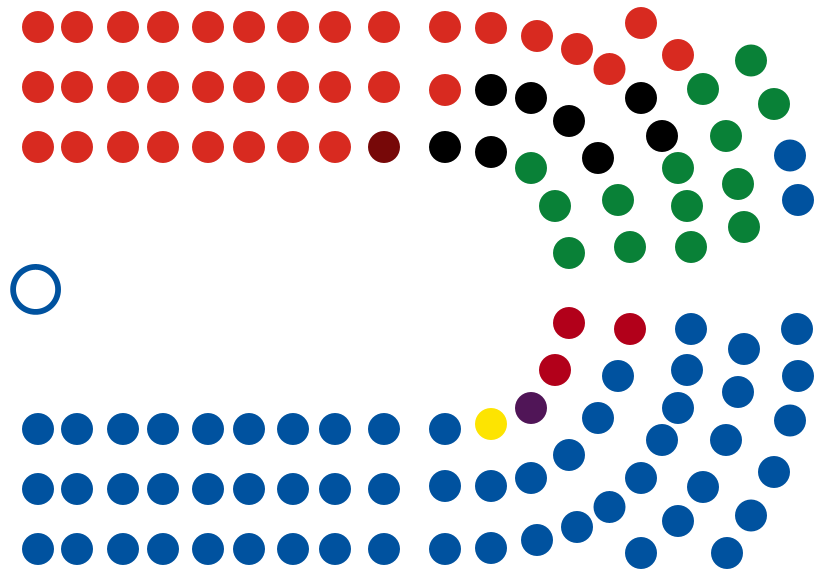
Parliamentary makeup prior to the 2014 election. Government: National (59) Māori (3) ACT (1) United Future (1) Opposition: Labour (34) Green (14) NZ First (7) Mana (1) Independent Coalition (1)

The 2014 New Zealand general election took place on Saturday 20 September 2014 to determine the membership of the 51st New Zealand Parliament.

Voters elected 121 members to the House of Representatives, with 71 from single-member electorates (an increase from 70 in 2011) and 49 from party lists. Since 1996, New Zealand has used the Mixed Member Proportional (MMP) voting system, giving voters two votes: one for a political party and one for their local electorate MP. The party vote decides how many seats each party gets in the new Parliament; a party is entitled to a share of the seats if it receives 5% of the party vote or wins an electorate. Normally, the House has 120 seats but extra seats may be added where there is an overhang, caused by a party winning more electorates than seats it is entitled to. The one-seat overhang from the 50th Parliament remained for the 51st Parliament, after United Future won one electorate when their 0.22% party vote did not entitle them to any seats.

A total of 3,140,417 people were registered to vote in the election; around 92.6% of all eligible New Zealanders. A total of 2,446,279 votes were cast, including a record 717,579 advance votes, more than double the number cast in 2011. Turnout was 77.90%, higher than the 2011 election, but the sixth-lowest since women gained the vote in 1893.

The centre-right National Party, led by incumbent Prime Minister John Key, won a plurality with 47.0% of the party vote and 60 of the 121 seats. On election night counts, the party appeared to hold the first majority since 1994 with 61 seats, but lost one seat to the Green Party on the official count. National re-entered confidence and supply agreements with the centrist United Future, the neoliberal ACT Party, and the indigenous rights-based Māori Party to form a minority government and give the Fifth National Government a third term.

The centre-left Labour Party, National's traditional opponent, lost ground for the fourth election in a row, receiving 25.1% of the party vote and 32 seats. The Green Party dropped in the party vote from 11.1% to 10.7%, but remained steady on 14 seats. New Zealand First meanwhile increased its vote share to 8.7% and seat count to 11. The Māori Party, ACT, and United Future retained their Parliamentary representation, despite losing party votes. The Internet Mana Party did not return to Parliament after its only representative in Parliament, Hone Harawira, was defeated in his electorate of Te Tai Tokerau.

== Background ==
=== MMP review ===
A referendum on the voting system took place in conjunction with the 2011 election, with 57.8% of voters voting to keep the existing Mixed Member Proportional (MMP) voting system. Under the terms of the Electoral Referendum Act 2010 the majority vote in favour of retaining MMP meant that the Electoral Commission had the task of conducting an independent review of the workings of the MMP system.

The Commission released a consultation paper in February 2012 calling for public submissions on ways to improve the MMP system, with the focus put on six areas:

1. basis of eligibility for list seats (thresholds)
2. by-election candidates
3. dual candidacy
4. order of candidates on party lists
5. overhang
6. proportion of electorate seats to list seats

The Commission released a proposal paper for consultation in August 2012 and published its final report on 29 October 2012. In the report, the Commission recommended the following:

- Reducing the party vote threshold from 5 percent to 4 percent. If introduced, the 4 percent threshold should be reviewed after three general elections.
- Abolishing the one electorate seat threshold – a party must cross the party vote threshold to gain list seats.
- Abolishing the provision of overhang seats for parties not reaching the threshold – the extra electorates would be made up at the expense of list seats to retain 120 MPs
- Retaining the status quo for by-election candidacy and dual candidacy.
- Retaining the status quo with closed party lists, but increasing scrutiny in selection of list candidates to ensure parties comply with their own party rules.
- Parliament should give consideration to fixing the ratio between electorate seats and list seats at 60:40 (72:48 in a 120-seat parliament).

Parliament has the right to decide whether to implement any changes to the system, which had been largely unchanged since it was introduced in 1994 for the 1996 election. In November 2012 a private member's bill under the name of opposition Labour Party member Iain Lees-Galloway proposed implementing the first two recommendations; it was drawn from the member's bill ballot on 14 November 2013, but by the time Parliament dissolved for the election, it was still awaiting its first reading. In May 2014 Judith Collins and John Key announced that no inter-party consensus existed on implementing the recommendations of the Commission, so the Government would not introduce any legislation.

=== 50th Parliament (2011–14) ===
Following the 2011 general election, the National Party entered into confidence and supply agreements with ACT, the Māori Party and United Future to continue the Fifth National Government. These arrangements give the National-led government a majority of seven seats, with 64 on confidence-and-supply in the 121-seat Parliament.

The Labour, Green, New Zealand First and Mana parties are all in opposition, but only the Labour Party constitutes the formal Opposition.

At the 2011 election, the National Party gained 59 seats, the Labour Party 34 seats, the Green Party 14 seats, New Zealand First eight seats, Māori three seats, and Mana, ACT, and United Future gained one seat each. One change was made to the allocation during the Parliament. In 2012, Brendan Horan was expelled from the NZ First caucus but continued to sit as an independent, meaning NZ First had seven caucus MPs for the remainder of the Parliament.

On 31 May 2013, the Electoral Commission de-registered United Future after it could not prove it had the 500 financial members required for registration. The party successfully re-registered on 13 August 2013, but in the interim its sole MP, Peter Dunne, sat in the house as an independent. On 13 June 2014, ACT's sole MP John Banks resigned from Parliament after being found guilty of filing a false electoral return for his 2010 Auckland mayoral campaign. As his resignation came within six months of the election, his seat was left vacant, meaning ACT had no representation in Parliament until the general election.

== Dates ==
On 10 March 2014, Prime Minister John Key announced that the election would take place on Saturday 20 September 2014. As in 2011, the Prime Minister announced the date early, although only six months in advance compared to the nearly ten months in 2011. Traditionally, the election date is a closely guarded secret, and announced as late as possible.

A general election must take place every three years, and Parliaments generally run the full three-year term unless an early election is called or the election date is set to circumvent holding a by-election. Voting for the previous election occurred on Saturday, 26 November 2011. In 1950, New Zealand introduced a legal requirement to hold elections on a Saturday, and beginning with the 1957 election, a convention evolved to hold general elections on the last Saturday of November. The events of 1984 upset this convention, and it took until the 1999 election for election dates to creep gradually back towards the conventional timing, only for an early election to occur in 2002. By the 2011 election, the conventional "last Saturday of November" was achieved again. If the convention had been followed in 2014, the election would have taken place on 29 November.

In October 2013, Prime Minister John Key hinted that the election would take place before November. The setting of the election date became further influenced by Australia inviting New Zealand to attend the G20 summit in Brisbane on 15 and 16 November 2014, with the possibility that some leaders might make flying visits to New Zealand. Ideally, major diplomatic visits and engagements should be avoided during the election period, as they can distract politicians from campaigning and voters may see them as an attempt to influence the election result.

Key dates relating to the General Election include:

10 March 2014 (Monday)	Prime Minister John Key announces election to be held on 20 September
20 June 2014 (Friday)	The regulated election advertising period begins.
31 July 2014 (Thursday)	Last sitting day for the 50th Parliament
14 August 2014 (Thursday)	Governor General dissolves the 50th Parliament
20 August 2014 (Wednesday)	Writ Day – Governor General issues formal direction to the Electoral Commission to hold the election. Electoral roll closes for printing (all people enrolling after this date must cast special declaration votes); Official campaigning begins; radio and television advertising begins
27 August 2014 (Wednesday)	Details of candidates for election and polling places released
3 September 2014 (Wednesday)	Advance and overseas voting begins
19 September 2014 (Friday)	Advance voting ends; overseas voting ends at 16:00 local time The regulated election advertising period ends; all election advertising must be taken down by midnight
20 September 2014 (Saturday)	Election Day – polling places open 09:00 to 19:00; Preliminary results released progressively after 19:00
4 October 2014 (Saturday)	Official results released
9 October 2014 (Thursday)	Writ for election returned; official declaration of elected members (subject to judicial recounts)

== Electorate boundaries ==
Per the Electoral Act 1993, the South Island must have 16 general electorates, with the number of North Island general and Maori electorates calculated by dividing the respective population in each group by one-sixteenth of the South Island general electorate population, within a tolerance of five percent. At the 2011 election, the North Island had 47 general electorates and the Maori roll had seven Māori electorates, totalling 70 electorates across the country. Following the March 2013 New Zealand census and the 2013 Maori electoral option, the Representation Commission re-drew some electorate boundaries.

In October 2013, Statistics New Zealand announced that there would be one additional North Island general electorate, bringing the total number of North Island general electorates to 48 and the overall number of electorates to 71. Growth in Auckland saw three existing electorates, Auckland Central, Helensville and Hunua, exceed their quota by at least 14 percent. Population changes in Christchurch following the 2011 earthquakes meanwhile saw the Christchurch East electorate drop to 23 percent below quota, while the urban fringe electorate of Selwyn grew to 14 percent above quota.

The Representation Commission, tasked with redrawing the electorate boundaries, released its final electorate boundaries on 17 April 2014. The largest changes took place in northern and western Auckland, with two new electorates – Upper Harbour and Kelston – created, while the existing Waitakere electorate was dissolved. Upper Harbour centres on the Upper Harbour Bridge, stretching from Wairau Valley to Massey, and was predicted to be a safe National seat. Kelston centres on the western Auckland suburb of the same name, stretching from Oratia to Waterview, and was predicted to be a safe Labour seat. Kelston's creation took population from the Mount Albert electorate, which in turn allowed Mount Albert to take Westmere and Grey Lynn from Auckland Central, bringing Auckland Central within quota. Helensville's over-quota has been solved by the creation of the Upper Harbour electorate, while Hunua has lost the area south of the Auckland Region boundary to Waikato to bring it within quota.

In Christchurch, the under-quota Christchurch East and Christchurch Central electorates took population from Waimakariri in the north and from Port Hills in the south. While it was correctly predicted Christchurch East would remain a Labour seat, the prediction that the marginal Christchurch Central electorate would move in Labour's favour proved false; the seat instead swung in National's favour. The loss of Labour-leaning urban parts of Waimakariri made it a safer seat for National, which increased it majority from 642 votes in 2011 to 2,133 in 2014. The Halswell-Oaklands-Westmorland area moved from Selwyn into Port Hills to compensate for Port Hills' loss and to bring Selwyn within quota. As Halswell-Oaklands-Westmorland are predominantly National-leaning, it caused the Labour-held electorate of Port Hills to become more marginal.

In Wellington, the Labour-leaning Hutt South electorate took the National-leaning western hill suburbs of Lower Hutt from Ōhariu and Rimutaka, in exchange for Rimutaka taking the Labour-leaning state housing suburb of Naenae. The changes allowed Ōhariu to take Wadestown off the over-quota Wellington Central electorate. This was correctly predicted to make Hutt South more marginal; Labour's Trevor Mallard retained the seat in 2011 by a 4825-vote majority, and this reduced to just 709 in 2014, while Rimutaka's Chris Hipkins increased his majority by 3,378 votes.

== Retiring MPs ==
Twenty-two existing Members of Parliament did not stand for re-election, including fourteen members of the governing National Party.

Name	Party	Electorate/List	Term in office
John Banks (Note: After his trial for filing a false electoral return John Banks resigned from Parliament on 13 June 2014)	ACT	Epsom	1981–99; 2011–14
Holly Walker (Note: Although Walker contested Hutt South, she did not expect to win and was not on the party list.)	Green	List	2011–14
Darien Fenton	Labour	List	2005–14
Rajen Prasad	Labour	List	2008–14
Ross Robertson	Labour	Manukau East	1987–2014
Pita Sharples	Māori	Tāmaki Makaurau	2005–14
Tariana Turia	Māori	Te Tai Hauāuru	1996–14
Shane Ardern	National	Taranaki-King Country	1998–2014
Chris Auchinvole	National	List	2005–14
Cam Calder	National	List	2009–14
Claudette Hauiti	National	List	2013–14
John Hayes	National	Wairarapa	2005–14
Phil Heatley	National	Whangarei	1999–2014
Tau Henare	National	List	1993–99; 2005–14
Paul Hutchison	National	Hunua	1999–2014
Colin King	National	Kaikoura	2005–14
Eric Roy	National	Invercargill	1993–2002; 2005–14
Tony Ryall	National	Bay of Plenty	1990–2014
Katrina Shanks (Note: Although she had previously announced her intention to stand down at the election, Shanks resigned from Parliament at the end of 2013.)	National	List	2007–13
Chris Tremain	National	Napier	2005–14
Kate Wilkinson	National	Waimakariri	2005–14
Andrew Williams (Note: Although he was previously announced as New Zealand First candidate for East Coast Bays and thirteenth-ranked on the list, Williams was removed as a candidate before the election.)	New Zealand First	List	2011–14

=== List-only MPs ===
Bill English (National) announced in January 2014 that he would retire as the electorate MP for Clutha-Southland and he instead stood as a list-only MP.

== Contesting parties and candidates ==
At the close of nominations, 554 individuals had been nominated to contest the election, up from 544 at the 2011 election. Of those, 71 were list-only, 114 were electorate-only (including 13 candidates from non-registered parties and 23 independent candidates), and 369 contested for both list and electorate seats. Just under 30% of candidates (164) were female, up from 27% in 2011.

Political parties registered with the Electoral Commission on Writ Day can contest the general election as a party. Each such party can submit a party list to contest the party vote, and can have a party election-expenses limit in addition to limits on individual candidates' campaigns. At Writ Day, 19 political parties had registered to contend the general election. At the close of nominations, 15 registered parties had put forward a party list to the Commission to contest the party vote, up from 13 in 2011.

On 27 May 2014, the Mana Party and Internet Party announced an agreement to field a combined party list at the election under the Internet Mana Party banner. Their electorate candidates, however, can continue to campaign under each individual party's banner.

While registered, the 1Law4All Party and the Alliance did not put forward party lists.

Party	Leader(s)	Party vote % (2011 election)	Seats (as of 31 July 2014)	Electorate candidates	Party list candidates
Parties with seats in the 50th Parliament
ACT	Jamie Whyte	1.07	0 (Note: ACT's sole MP, John Banks, resigned from Parliament on 13 June 2014. No by-election took place for his electorate seat, as his resignation occurred within six months of the foreshadowed election.)	39	41
Green	Russel Norman / Metiria Turei	11.06	14	57	59
Independent Coalition	Brendan Horan	– (Note: Party did not exist at the time of the 2011 election.)	1	4	10
Labour	David Cunliffe	27.48	34	71	64
Mana (Note: The Internet Party and Mana Party will present a combined party list to contest the 2014 election as an electoral bloc under the name "Internet Mana".)	Hone Harawira	1.08	1	18	—N/a
Māori Party	Te Ururoa Flavell	1.43	3	24	24
National	John Key	47.31	59	64	75
NZ First	Winston Peters	6.59	7	31	31
United Future	Peter Dunne	0.60	1	11	11
Other registered parties without seats in the 50th Parliament
Alliance	Kevin Campbell / Kay Murray	0.05	–	1	0
Ban 1080	Bill Wallace / Mike Downard	–	–	5	9
Civilian	Ben Ufindell	–	–	0	8
Conservative	Colin Craig	2.65	–	64	20
Democrats	Stephnie de Ruyter	0.08	–	30	35
Focus	Ken Rintoul	–	–	2	8
Internet	Laila Harré	–	–	15	—N/a
Internet Mana	Hone Harawira / Laila Harré	–	–	—N/a	32
Legalise Cannabis	Julian Crawford	0.52	–	10	13

Non-registered parties contending the election include:

- Climate Party (Auckland Central, Rongotai)
- Communist League (Manukau East, Maungakiekie)
- Economic Euthenics Party (Wigram)
- Expatriate Party (Ikaroa-Rāwhiti)
- Human Rights Party (Mount Albert)
- Money Free Party (Auckland Central, Kaikōura, Nelson, Northland, West Coast-Tasman)
- Patriotic Revolutionary Front (Rongotai)

Independents are standing in Botany, Dunedin North (×2), Epsom (×4), Helensville (×2), Hutt South, Mount Albert, Northland, Ōhariu, Ōtaki, Rongotai, Tauranga (×2), Wellington Central, West Coast-Tasman, Ikaroa-Rāwhiti, Tāmaki Makaurau and Te Tai Tokerau.

== Campaigning ==
=== Campaign expense limits and broadcasting allocations ===
During the three-month regulated period prior to election day (i.e. 20 June to 19 September 2014), parties and candidates have limits on how much they may spend on election campaigning. It is illegal in New Zealand to campaign on election day itself.

For the 2014 election, every registered party contending the party vote is permitted to spend $1,091,000 plus $25,700 per electorate candidate on election campaigning during the regulated period, excluding radio and television campaigning (broadcasting funding is allocated separately). A party contesting all 71 electorates is therefore permitted to spend $2,915,700 on election campaigning. All electorate candidates are permitted to spend $25,700 each on campaigning over and above their party's allocation.

Registered parties are allocated a separate broadcasting budget for radio and television campaigning, and broadcasting time on Radio New Zealand and Television New Zealand to make opening and closing addresses. Only money from the broadcasting allocation can be used to purchase airtime; the actual production costs of advertisements can come from the general election expenses budget.

The Electoral Commission sets the amount of broadcasting funds and time each party gets. The initial election broadcasting allocation was announced on 6 June 2014. Two parties who were allocated broadcasting funds and time failed to register by Writ Day, so their funding and allocation of time for closing address were redistributed to the remaining parties. ACT did not receive any redistributed funding as they had lost their only MP since the initial allocation. Broadcasting funding was further redistributed on 29 August after the Alliance failed to register its party list (a requirement to receive broadcasting funds). This coincided with the Conservative Party's bid to receive a court-mandated increase in broadcasting funds and time, which was taken into consideration when funding was redistributed for the second time.

Party	Party expenses limit	Broadcasting allocation (final)	Opening address time allocation	Closing address time allocation
ACT	$2,093,300	$76,930	2 mins	2 mins
Civilian	$1,091,000	$34,729	60 secs	1 min 5 secs
Conservative	$2,735,800	$62,166	1 min 30 secs	1 min 40 secs
Democrats	$1,862,000	$34,729	60 secs	1 min 5 secs
Focus	$1,142,400	$34,729	60 secs	1 min 5 secs
Green	$2,555,900	$414,439	7 mins 30 secs	7 mins 55 secs
Independent Coalition	$1,193,800	$79,433	2 mins	2 mins 5 secs
Internet Mana	$1,939,100	$79,433	2 mins	2 mins 5 secs
Labour	$2,915,700	$949,756	13 mins 30 secs	14 mins 10 secs
Legalise Cannabis	$1,348,000	$34,729	60 secs	1 min 5 secs
Māori Party	$1,707,800	$103,610	2 mins 30 secs	2 mins 40 secs
National	$2,735,800	$1,087,902	15 mins 30 secs	16 mins 15 secs
NZ First	$1,887,700	$207,220	4 mins 30 secs	4 mins 45 secs
United Future	$1,373,700	$79,433	2 mins	2 mins 5 secs

Third party promoters, such as trade unions and lobby groups, can campaign during the regulated period. The maximum expense limit is $308,000 for those groups registered with the Electoral Commission, and $12,300 for unregistered groups. Those third party promoters registered for the election include:

- ActionStation
- Campaign 4 Change
- Dairy Workers Union
- Engineering, Printing and Manufacturing Union
- Family First
- Federated Mountain Clubs of New Zealand
- Financial Services Council
- First Union New Zealand
- Jill Whitmore
- Living Wage Movement Aotearoa New Zealand
- Maritime Union of New Zealand
- New Zealand Aged Care Association
- New Zealand Council of Trade Unions
- New Zealand Educational Institute
- New Zealand Nurses Organisation
- New Zealand Post Primary Teachers' Association
- New Zealand Union of Students' Associations
- The Opinion Partnership
- Pitt Street Methodist Church
- Public Service Association
- Service and Food Workers Union
- Unite Union

All campaign expense limits are inclusive of GST.

=== Campaigning timeline ===
==== Early campaigning: before 20 August ====
- 20 July – Election hoardings and billboards begin to appear.
- 31 July – The 50th New Zealand Parliament concludes with the adjournment debate.
- 10 August – Labour officially launches its election campaign in Auckland, making a promise of free GP visits and prescriptions to pregnant women and those aged under 13 and over 65.
- 13 August – Nicky Hager releases the book Dirty Politics, based on leaked e-mails from blogger Cameron Slater, alleging various ways National Party figures participated in Slater's "attack politics." Among other claims, Hager suggests one of John Key's staff members accessed the Labour Party online database, which journalist John Armstrong compared to the Watergate break-in.

==== First week: 20–24 August ====
- 20 August – Writ Day: radio and television advertising begins.
- 22 August – The party radio opening addresses air on Radio New Zealand National at 20:06.
- 23 August – The party television opening addresses air on TV One at 19:00.
- 24 August
  - National officially launches its election campaign in South Auckland. It promises to allow KiwiSaver members to withdraw member tax credits to help buy a first home, double the KiwiSaver first home deposit subsidy, and increase the limit on house prices to qualify for the subsidy.
  - Internet Mana officially launches its election campaign in Auckland. Kim Dotcom makes a comment that he once hacked the German credit rating system and put the Prime Minister's rating to zero because he "didn't like the guy." When interviewed, Internet Party press secretary Pam Corkery intervenes, calling reporter Brook Sabin a "puffed-up little shit".

==== Second week: 25–31 August ====
- 27 August – The National and Conservative parties admit they had installed motion-activated cameras to monitor their election hoardings, which had been subject to persistent vandalism. Among the more creative vandalism are Labour Auckland Central candidate Jacinda Ardern as a pirate and Conservative leader Colin Craig as a member of KISS.
- 28 August – The first TVNZ leaders' debate between John Key and David Cunliffe takes place.
- 30 August – Judith Collins resigns as a minister due to recurring controversies throughout her tenure as Minister of Justice. Her resignation comes following an accusation by Winston Peters that her office came to him with a possible leadership challenge against John Key, and the revelation of an e-mail from blogger Cameron Slater in 2011 that suggests Collins may have undermined a Director of the Serious Fraud Office.

==== Third week: 1–7 September ====
- 2 September – The Press leaders' debate between John Key and David Cunliffe takes place in Christchurch. Key claims a win after Cunliffe could not answer whether family homes held in a trust would be exempt under Labour's capital gains tax policy.
- 3 September – Advance voting opens, with Labour leader David Cunliffe and Internet Party founder Kim Dotcom among the first to vote.
- 5 September – The TVNZ multi-party leaders' debate takes place. The leaders participating are Russel Norman (Green), Winston Peters (NZ First), Peter Dunne (United Future), Te Ururoa Flavell (Māori), Hone Harawira (Internet Mana), Jamie Whyte (ACT), Brendan Horan (NZIC) and Colin Craig (Conservative).
- 7 September – ACT officially launches its election campaign at Ellerslie, Auckland, making promises to repeal the Resource Management Act and abolish the Overseas Investment Office if elected.

==== Fourth week: 8–14 September ====
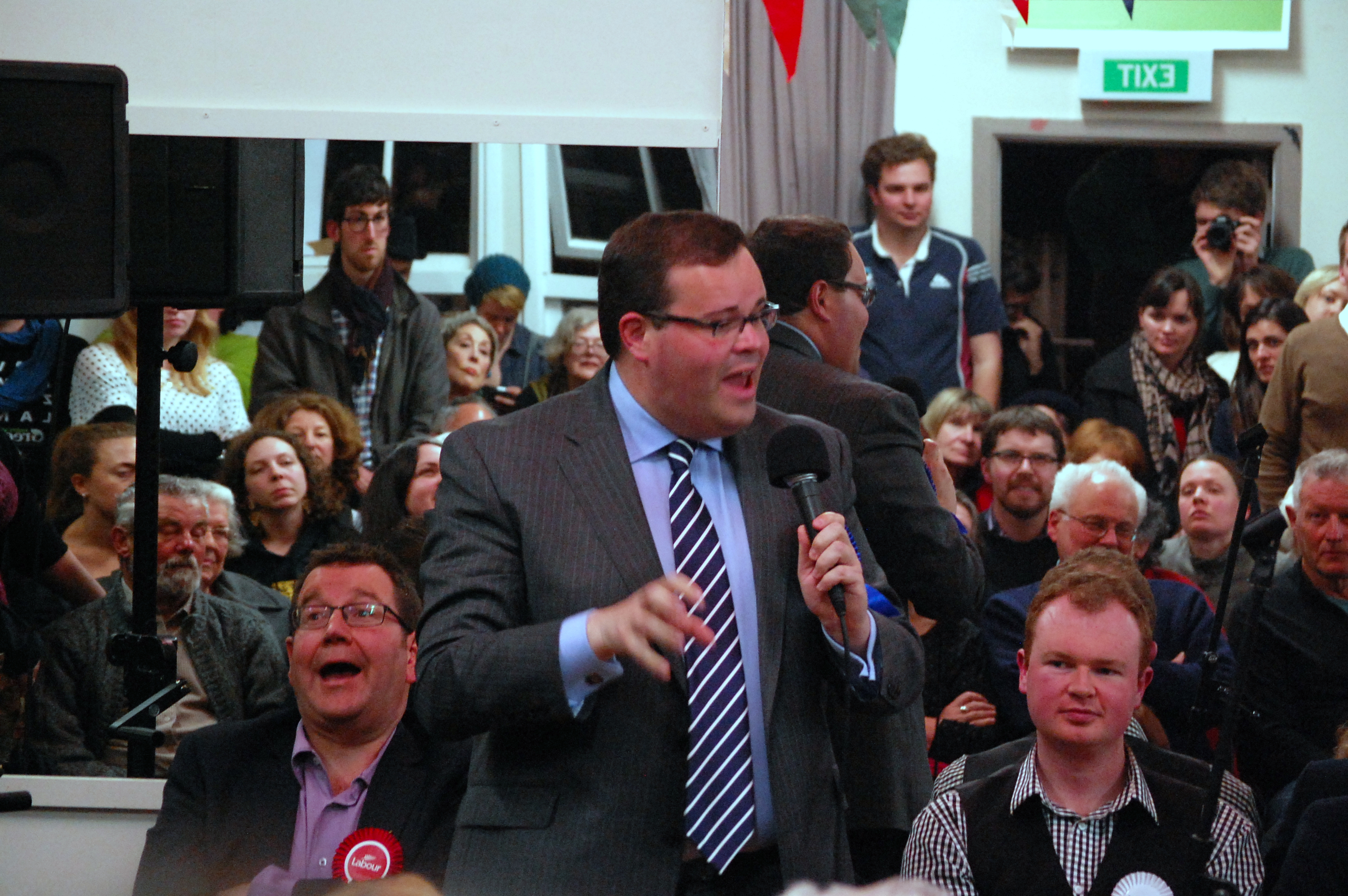
Paul Foster-Bell speaking at the Aro Valley candidates meeting, held in Wellington on 8 September

- 8 September – An expletive-filled email is sent by Mana Party leader Hone Harawira to party members. In it, Harawira claims the Internet Party is putting too many resources into promoting cannabis law reform rather than into Mana's flagship policy of providing breakfast and lunch to students at low socio-economic decile schools.
- 10 September
  - The TV3 leaders' debate between John Key and David Cunliffe takes place.
  - The Electoral Commission announces it will not allow photography in polling booths, after several incidents where advance voters had taken selfies with their completed ballot paper or behind voting screens and posted them to social media. Posting an image of a completed ballot paper within 3 days of election day is illegal, and can attract a $20,000 fine.

==== Final week: 15–19 September ====
Raw audio of the press conference held after The Moment of Truth

- 15 September
  - The Internet Party organises "The Moment of Truth", an event held in Auckland to release information related to New Zealand's involvement in the Five Eyes network. Kim Dotcom, Glenn Greenwald, Edward Snowden and Julian Assange all participate.
  - A Māori Television Reid Research poll of the Te Tai Tokerau electorate is released, showing Labour candidate Kelvin Davis on 37%, only one percent behind incumbent Mana Party leader Hone Harawira. Harawira is relying on an electorate win to allow Internet Mana to enter Parliament without needing to get 5% of the party vote.
- 16 September – The publishers for US rapper Eminem files a lawsuit with the Wellington High Court, alleging the National Party had infringed copyright by using an instrumental version of the song "Lose Yourself" in its television advertisements without permission. The party rejects the lawsuit, with campaign manager Steven Joyce saying the song was "pretty legal", having been purchased from an Australian music library.
- 17 September – The second TVNZ leaders' debate between John Key and David Cunliffe takes place. Key reiterates for supporters not to split the party vote, saying "If you want steak for dinner tonight, go and buy steak; don't buy a lamb chop. If you want a National government, party vote National." Cunliffe says he would work with the Greens and NZ First after the election, which based on the 3 News Reid Research poll released the same day would out-poll National and its "ragtag bunch of right-wing weirdos". Both leaders ruled out working with the Internet Mana Party after the election.
- 18 September
  - Conservative leader Colin Craig's press secretary, Rachel MacGregor, resigns, allegedly calling Craig a "manipulative man". Craig only learns about the resignation when questioned about it by the media, and says the resignation most likely relates to burnout.
  - National leader John Key and NZ First leader Winston Peters publicly endorse Labour candidate Kelvin Davis in Te Tai Tokerau. In response, incumbent Hone Harawira says that National and NZ First are trying to sway the election against the wishes of voters.
- 19 September – Last day of campaigning. Party closing addresses air on TV One at 19:30 and Radio New Zealand National at 20:06.

== Opinion polling ==
Opinion polls have been undertaken periodically since the 2011 election by Fairfax Media (Fairfax Media Ipsos), MediaWorks New Zealand (3 News Reid Research), The New Zealand Herald (Herald Digipoll), Roy Morgan Research, and Television New Zealand (One News Colmar Brunton). The graph on the left below shows the collated results of all five polls for parties that polled above the 5% electoral threshold at the 2011 election; The graph on the right shows results for parties that polled between 1% and 4.9%, or won an electorate seat, at the 2011 election, as well as parties contesting the 2014 election which have polled over 1.0% since 2011.

After the November 2011 election, National remained around the 47% mark in polling until the end of 2013, when its popularity slowly rose to 49% by the last week before the election. Labour recovered from its 27.5% election result to cross the 30% mark in March 2012, before levelling out around 33% for most of 2013. From around November 2013, Labour's support started slipping, down to 25% by election day. The Green Party and New Zealand First did not move much from the 11% and 5% marks respectively until the last few weeks before the election, where they each gained 1–2%. No other party has polled above the 5% threshold, although the Conservative Party came close on individual polls in the weeks before the election.

== Results ==
Preliminary results were gradually released after 19:00 (NZST) on 20 September, with the targets that all advance vote results were available by 20:30 and all preliminary results were available by 23:30. The preliminary count is done within the polling booths, and only includes ordinary votes; it does not include any special votes. Special votes include votes from those who enrolled after the deadline on 20 August, those who voted outside their electorate (this includes all overseas votes), hospital votes, and those voters enrolled on the unpublished roll.

All voting papers, counterfoils and electoral rolls are returned to the electorate's returning officer for a compulsory recount; this also includes approving and counting any special votes, and compiling a master roll to ensure no voter has voted more than once. Official results, including all recounted ordinary votes and special votes, were released at 14:00 on Saturday 4 October 2014. Parties and candidates had 3 working days afterwards (i.e. until 8 October 2014) to apply to the District Court for a judicial recount.

On 7 October 2014, Mana Party leader Hone Harawira filed for a judicial recount of the Te Tai Tokerau electorate. The recount was taken under the auspices of Judge TJ Broadmore at the Kaitaia District Court on 8 and 9 October, and apart from a few minor changes in vote tallies, the official result was upheld.

=== Overall results ===
Party vote percentage
1. National (47.0%)
2. Labour (25.1%)
3. Green (10.7%)
4. NZ First (8.66%)
5. Conservative (3.97%)
6. Internet Mana (1.42%)
7. Māori (1.32%)
8. ACT (0.69%)
9. United Future (0.22%)
10. Other (0.85%)

Seating diagram after the election.

Summary of the 20 September 2014 election for the House of Representatives
Party	Party vote			Electorate vote			Seats			
Party	Votes	%	Change (pp)	Votes	%	Change (pp)	List	Electorate	Total	+/-
National	1,131,501	47.04	▼0.28	1,081,787	46.08	▼1.23	19	41	60	▲1
Labour	604,535	25.13	▼2.35	801,287	34.13	▼0.99	5	27	32	▼2
Green	257,359	10.70	▼0.36	165,718	7.06	▼0.10	14	0	14	Steady
NZ First	208,300	8.66	▲2.06	73,384	3.13	▲1.29	11	0	11	▲3
Māori Party	31,849	1.32	▼0.11	42,108	1.79	▼0.02	1	1	2	▼1
ACT	16,689	0.69	▼0.37	27,778	1.18	▼0.25	0	1	1	Steady
United Future	5,286	0.22	▼0.38	14,722	0.63	▼0.24	0	1	1	Steady
Conservative	95,598	3.97	▲1.32	81,075	3.45	▲1.07	0	0	0	Steady
Internet Mana	34,094	1.42	▲0.34 (Note: Change in comparison with the 2011 vote for the MANA Movement.)	37,181	1.58	▲0.20 (Note: Change in comparison with the 2011 vote for the MANA Movement.)	0	0	0	▼1
Legalise Cannabis	10,961	0.46	▼0.07	4,936	0.21	▼0.08	0	0	0	Steady
Ban 1080	5,113	0.21	new	4,448	0.19	new	0	0	0	new
Democrats	1,730	0.07	▼0.01	4,647	0.20	▲0.10	0	0	0	Steady
Civilian	1,096	0.05	new	—	—	—		0	0	new
Independent Coalition	872	0.04	new	1,929	0.08	new	0	0	0	new
Focus	639	0.03	new	1,797	0.08	new	0	0	0	new
Alliance	—	—	▼0.05	59	0.00	▼0.06	0	0	0	Steady
Unregistered Parties	—	—	—	887	0.04	▼0.03	0	0	0	Steady
Independent	—	—	—	3,864	0.16	▲0.03	0	0	0	Steady
Valid votes	2,405,622	98.34	▲0.16	2,347,607	95.97	▲0.65				
Informal votes	10,857	0.44	▼0.43	27,886	1.14	▼1.20				
Disallowed votes	29,818	1.22	▲0.29	70,804	2.89	▲0.55				
Below electoral threshold	150,103	6.14	—	—	—	—				
Total	2,446,297	100		2,446,297	100		50	71	121	
Eligible voters and Turnout	3,140,417	77.90	▲3.96	3,140,417	77.90	▲3.96				

=== Non-parliamentary parties ===
Eight parties did not gain 5% of the party vote or win an electorate seat, entitling them to no representation in the 51st Parliament.

Despite speculation that the Conservative Party might cross the 5% threshold, it did not; nonetheless, it secured an increase in its share of the party vote, winning just under 4.0%. The Aotearoa Legalise Cannabis Party received 0.46% of the vote, twice as many as the lowest-polling party to gain a seat, United Future.

=== Voting summary ===
Constituency Vote
National	46.08%
Labour	34.13%
Green	7.06%
Conservative	3.45%
NZ First	3.13%
Māori	1.79%
Internet Mana	1.58%
ACT	1.18%
United Future	0.63%
Others	0.97%

Party Vote
National	47.04%
Labour	25.13%
Green	10.70%
NZ First	8.66%
Conservative	3.97%
Internet Mana	1.42%
Māori	1.32%
ACT	0.69%
United Future	0.22%
Others	0.85%

Parliament seats
National	49.59%
Labour	26.44%
Green	11.57%
NZ First	9.09%
Māori	1.65%
ACT	0.83%
United Future	0.83%

=== Electorate results ===
Party affiliation of winning electorate candidates.

Prior to the election, the National Party held the majority of the electorate seats with 41. Labour held 22 seats, Māori held three seats, and ACT, Mana and United Future held one seat each. There are two new electorates in 2014, Kelston and Upper Harbour.

National held steady on 41 electorates, Labour gained three seats to hold 27 electorates, Māori lost two seats to hold one, and ACT and United Future held steady with one seat each. The Mana Party lost its only seat, after sole incumbent MP Hone Harawira lost Te Tai Tokerau to Labour's Kelvin Davis.

In the two new electorates, Labour's Carmel Sepuloni won Kelston, while National's Paula Bennett won Upper Harbour. Bennett previously held Waitakere, which was disestablished prior to the election in favour of the two new electorates.

In 11 electorates, the incumbents did not seek re-election, and the seats passed to new MPs of the same party. In the remaining 3 electorates where the incumbent did not seek re-election, the electorate changed allegiance. In Napier, Labour's Stuart Nash won the seat off retiring National MP Chris Tremain, caused by large vote splitting between National candidate Wayne Walford and Conservative candidate Garth McVicar. In Tāmaki Makaurau and Te Tai Hauāuru, Labour won both seats off the retiring Māori Party co-leaders Pita Sharples and Tariana Turia.

Of the 55 electorates where the incumbents sought re-election, only the aforementioned Te Tai Tokerau changed hands.

The table below shows the results of the 2014 general election:

Key:

National	Labour	Green	NZ First	Conservative
ACT	United Future	Māori Party	Mana

Electorate results of the 2014 New Zealand general election
Electorate	Incumbent	Winner	Majority	Runner up	Third place
Auckland Central	Nikki Kaye		600	Jacinda Ardern (Note: This candidate was ultimately elected to Parliament via their party list.)	Denise Roche
Bay of Plenty	Tony Ryall (Note: This MP retired prior to the election.)	Todd Muller	15,096	Clare Wilson	Raymond Dolman
Botany	Jami-Lee Ross		13,495	Tofik Mamedov	Paul Young
Christchurch Central	Nicky Wagner		2,420	Tony Milne	David Moorhouse
Christchurch East	Poto Williams		4,073	Jo Hayes	Mojo Mathers
Clutha-Southland	Bill English (Note: This MP did not re-contest the electorate this election, instead contesting the party list only.)	Todd Barclay	14,886	Liz Craig	Rachael Goldsmith
Coromandel	Scott Simpson		15,801	Catherine Delahunty	Korbinian Poschl
Dunedin North	David Clark		5,917	Michael Woodhouse	Metiria Turei
Dunedin South	Clare Curran		3,858	Hamish Walker	Shane Gallagher
East Coast	Anne Tolley		7,934	Moana Mackey	Gavin Maclean
East Coast Bays	Murray McCully		15,034	Colin Craig	Greg Milner-White
Epsom	(vacant) (Note: This electorate had been vacant since John Banks' resignation from Parliament on 13 June 2014 after his trial for filing a false electoral return.)	David Seymour	4,250	Paul Goldsmith	Michael Wood
Hamilton East	David Bennett		10,199	Cliff Allen	Mark Servian
Hamilton West	Tim Macindoe		5,784	Sue Moroney	Bill Gudgeon
Helensville	John Key		18,287	Kennedy Graham	Corie Haddock
Hunua	Paul Hutchison	Andrew Bayly	17,376	Arena Williams	Jon Reeves
Hutt South	Trevor Mallard		709	Chris Bishop	Holly Walker
Ilam	Gerry Brownlee		11,898	James Dann	John Kelcher
Invercargill	Eric Roy	Sarah Dowie	7,482	Lesley Soper	Ria Bond
Kaikoura	Colin King	Stuart Smith	12,570	Jannette Walker	Steffan Browning
Kelston	New electorate	Carmel Sepuloni	5,367	Chris Penk	Ruth Irwin
Mana	Kris Faafoi		7,953	Hekia Parata	Jan Logie
Māngere	William Sio		14,933	Misa Fia Turner	Edward Saafi
Manukau East	Ross Robertson	Jenny Salesa	13,254	Kanwal Singh Bakshi	Asenati Taylor
Manurewa	Louisa Wall		6,402	Simeon Brown	John Hall
Maungakiekie	Sam Lotu-Iiga		2,348	Carol Beaumont	Richard Leckinger
Mount Albert	David Shearer		10,656	Melissa Lee	Jeanette Elley
Mount Roskill	Phil Goff		8,091	Parmjeet Parmar	Barry Coates
Napier	Chris Tremain	Stuart Nash	3,850	Wayne Walford	Garth McVicar
Nelson	Nick Smith		7,605	Maryan Street	Colin Robertson
New Lynn	David Cunliffe		4,557	Tim Groser	Daniel Rogers
New Plymouth	Jonathan Young		9,778	Andrew Little	Sarah Roberts
North Shore	Maggie Barry		16,503	Claire Szabó	Brett Stansfield
Northcote	Jonathan Coleman		9,664	Richard Hills	Anne-Elise Smithson
Northland	Mike Sabin		9,300	Willow-Jean Prime	David Clendon
Ōhariu	Peter Dunne		710	Ginny Andersen	Brett Hudson
Ōtaki	Nathan Guy		7,782	Rob McCann	Maddy Drew
Pakuranga	Maurice Williamson		12,867	Barry Kirker	Andrew Craig
Palmerston North	Iain Lees-Galloway		2,212	Jono Naylor	Darroch Ball
Papakura	Judith Collins		5,119	Jerome Mika	Brent Catchpole
Port Hills	Ruth Dyson		2,228	Nuk Korako	Eugenie Sage
Rangitata	Jo Goodhew		14,107	Steven Gibson	Oliver Vitali
Rangitīkei	Ian McKelvie		11,060	Deborah Russell	Romuald Rudzki
Rimutaka	Chris Hipkins		6,664	Lewis Holden	Aaron Hunt
Rodney	Mark Mitchell		20,230	Eric Bolt	Tracey Martin
Rongotai	Annette King		9,617	Chris Finlayson	Russel Norman
Rotorua	Todd McClay		7,418	Tāmati Coffey	Fletcher Tabuteau
Selwyn	Amy Adams		20,561	Peter Hill	Gordon Dickson
Tāmaki	Simon O'Connor		20,421	Chao-Fu Wu	Dorthe Siggaard
Taranaki-King Country	Shane Ardern	Barbara Kuriger	16,773	Penny Gaylor	Robert Moore
Taupō	Louise Upston		15,046	Jamie Strange	Edwin Perry
Tauranga	Simon Bridges		14,842	Rachel Jones	Clayton Mitchell
Te Atatū	Phil Twyford		2,813	Alfred Ngaro	Gary Stewart
Tukituki	Craig Foss		6,490	Anna Lorck	Chris Perley
Upper Harbour	New electorate	Paula Bennett	9,692	Hermann Retzlaff	Nicholas Mayne
Waikato	Lindsay Tisch		16,169	Christine Greer	Barbara Stewart
Waimakariri	Kate Wilkinson	Matt Doocey	2,506	Clayton Cosgrove	Reuben Hunt
Wairarapa	John Hayes	Alastair Scott	6,771	Kieran McAnulty	Ron Mark
Waitaki	Jacqui Dean		16,668	Glenda Alexander	Sue Coutts
Wellington Central	Grant Robertson		8,267	Paul Foster-Bell	James Shaw
West Coast-Tasman	Damien O'Connor		4,094	Maureen Pugh	Kevin Hague
Whanganui	Chester Borrows		4,505	Hamish McDouall	Kim MacIntyre
Whangarei	Phil Heatley	Shane Reti	13,169	Kelly Ellis	Paul Doherty
Wigram	Megan Woods		3,330	Karl Varley	Richard Wesley
Māori electorates
Hauraki-Waikato	Nanaia Mahuta		7,695	Susan Cullen	Angeline Greensill
Ikaroa-Rāwhiti	Meka Whaitiri		4,673	Te Hāmua Nikora	Marama Fox
Tāmaki Makaurau	Pita Sharples	Peeni Henare	1,462	Rangi McLean	Marama Davidson
Te Tai Hauāuru	Tariana Turia	Adrian Rurawhe	1,554	Chris McKenzie	Jack Tautokai McDonald
Te Tai Tokerau	Hone Harawira	Kelvin Davis	743	Hone Harawira	Te Hira Paenga
Te Tai Tonga	Rino Tirikatene		3,554	Ngaire Button	Dora Roimata Langsbury
Waiariki	Te Ururoa Flavell		3,889	Rawiri Waititi	Annette Sykes

=== List results ===
==== Party vote by electorate ====
Highest polling party in each electorate.

Highest polling party bloc in each electorate. Government is the combined party vote of National, Māori, ACT and United Future; Opposition is the combined party vote of Labour, Green and NZ First.

The following is a breakdown of the party vote received in each electorate. Only parties that polled over 5 percent in at least one electorate are included.

New Zealand First 2014 general election results by electorate

Electorate	National	Labour	Green	NZ First	Conservative	Internet Mana	Māori
Auckland Central	44.93	21.67	22.17	5.18	1.73	1.96	0.56
Bay of Plenty	57.66	13.07	7.23	13.94	5.66	0.51	0.57
Botany	59.65	22.27	4.35	5.44	4.53	0.61	0.21
Christchurch Central	44.66	26.25	15.82	7.19	3.11	1.03	0.46
Christchurch East	39.79	32.16	12.66	9.45	3.26	0.88	0.40
Clutha-Southland	63.38	14.71	7.73	6.24	5.04	0.46	0.33
Coromandel	54.17	15.71	9.82	12.50	5.28	0.68	0.49
Dunedin North	32.26	31.82	22.94	6.75	2.73	1.72	0.35
Dunedin South	39.87	33.26	12.29	9.11	2.93	0.82	0.25
East Coast	48.62	22.74	9.21	11.84	4.08	1.17	0.95
East Coast Bays	63.38	12.15	8.23	5.96	6.70	0.67	0.38
Epsom	63.60	13.42	12.52	3.48	2.48	0.83	0.46
Hamilton East	50.03	23.77	11.02	7.14	4.81	1.00	0.64
Hamilton West	47.73	25.69	8.21	10.82	4.67	0.72	0.56
Helensville	58.51	12.53	13.58	7.38	4.78	0.96	0.54
Hunua	63.91	13.10	5.79	9.58	5.04	0.46	0.40
Hutt South	45.30	27.98	12.75	7.48	3.57	0.72	0.53
Ilam	57.72	17.67	12.96	5.12	3.68	0.66	0.48
Invercargill	49.48	25.07	7.57	11.16	3.68	0.62	0.32
Kaikōura	56.64	17.10	9.18	9.85	4.66	0.46	0.36
Kelston	32.32	42.13	10.74	8.45	2.96	1.41	0.31
Mana	40.53	34.39	12.80	6.80	2.67	0.96	0.62
Māngere	15.66	67.56	3.97	7.35	3.07	1.19	0.45
Manukau East	20.29	63.70	3.65	7.80	2.08	1.04	0.32
Manurewa	27.69	53.03	3.97	9.49	2.82	1.15	0.69
Maungakiekie	41.65	35.30	9.46	6.61	3.17	1.09	0.54
Mount Albert	39.08	29.45	21.78	4.11	1.96	1.64	0.48
Mount Roskill	42.08	35.63	9.67	5.32	3.66	0.09	0.39
Napier	49.38	25.96	8.77	7.43	6.23	0.60	0.44
Nelson	44.43	24.71	14.14	7.67	5.50	0.83	0.33
New Lynn	39.23	36.09	10.05	7.18	3.68	1.10	0.36
New Plymouth	55.84	21.16	8.00	9.04	3.20	0.70	0.53
North Shore	61.71	14.21	10.69	5.83	4.34	0.65	0.45
Northcote	50.71	22.11	11.61	7.32	4.31	0.95	0.46
Northland	49.87	16.63	10.84	12.79	6.31	1.69	0.59
Ōhariu	50.40	23.50	15.07	4.77	3.00	0.69	0.58
Ōtaki	49.08	24.84	9.46	9.96	4.41	0.65	0.44
Pakuranga	60.41	15.96	6.35	7.11	5.59	0.62	0.31
Palmerston North	43.21	30.97	9.87	8.66	4.51	0.96	0.48
Papakura	51.28	25.93	5.21	10.81	4.14	0.80	0.50
Port Hills	46.96	23.87	17.09	6.62	3.11	0.75	0.40
Rangitata	55.55	22.28	7.50	7.87	4.37	0.39	0.26
Rangitīkei	53.64	18.49	7.81	11.29	6.10	0.60	0.56
Rimutaka	41.45	32.88	8.52	10.28	4.03	0.87	0.40
Rodney	61.16	12.33	8.52	9.09	6.77	0.59	0.36
Rongotai	32.73	30.52	26.42	5.44	1.62	1.47	0.62
Rotorua	52.05	21.17	6.75	12.20	4.01	0.80	1.43
Selwyn	63.58	12.97	10.90	6.95	3.49	0.51	0.31
Tāmaki	65.70	14.81	8.81	4.42	3.06	0.72	0.48
Taranaki-King Country	61.46	13.35	7.21	9.48	5.68	0.57	0.55
Taupō	57.13	18.63	6.14	10.29	4.77	0.52	0.82
Tauranga	55.81	14.43	7.12	14.50	5.78	0.48	0.60
Te Atatū	41.12	35.04	8.11	8.41	3.75	1.15	0.43
Tukituki	52.00	22.84	8.57	7.60	6.56	0.68	0.52
Upper Harbour	54.46	23.45	7.00	6.95	4.85	0.86	0.36
Waikato	60.21	14.78	5.78	10.79	5.72	0.50	0.55
Waimakariri	57.51	18.96	8.87	8.47	4.33	0.39	0.26
Wairarapa	52.48	20.62	8.38	11.74	4.34	0.44	0.56
Waitaki	57.16	18.07	11.06	6.97	4.39	0.40	0.26
Wellington Central	37.64	23.84	29.58	3.58	1.51	1.48	0.77
West Coast-Tasman	44.78	23.53	12.99	8.71	5.12	0.76	0.28
Whanganui	47.28	25.53	7.21	11.96	5.02	0.73	0.58
Whangarei	50.24	17.85	9.80	13.40	5.23	1.05	0.53
Wigram	42.91	28.67	12.82	8.56	3.61	0.76	0.47
Hauraki-Waikato	7.57	46.50	9.77	13.37	0.76	8.08	11.97
Ikaroa-Rāwhiti	5.45	48.09	10.43	11.42	0.60	9.87	12.37
Tāmaki Makaurau	7.63	40.84	11.81	14.12	0.62	10.82	12.84
Te Tai Hauāuru	7.11	42.23	11.93	11.79	0.57	6.82	17.64
Te Tai Tokerau	8.56	35.47	10.06	14.55	0.68	18.75	10.15
Te Tai Tonga	14.45	36.92	16.51	12.89	0.74	4.96	11.25
Waiariki	5.05	38.77	8.06	12.67	0.35	11.39	22.01

==== Successful list MPs ====
National	Labour	Green	NZ First	Māori
Bill English (02); David Carter (03); Steven Joyce (05); Hekia Parata (07); Chris Finlayson (08); Tim Groser (14); Michael Woodhouse (20); Paul Goldsmith (30); Melissa Lee (31); Kanwal Singh Bakshi (32); Jian Yang (33); Alfred Ngaro (34); Brett Hudson (39); Paul Foster-Bell (46); Jo Hayes (47); Parmjeet Parmar (48); Chris Bishop (49); Nuk Korako (50); Jono Naylor (51)	David Parker (02); Jacinda Ardern (05); Clayton Cosgrove (08); Sue Moroney (10); Andrew Little (11)	Metiria Turei (01); Russel Norman (02); Kevin Hague (03); Eugenie Sage (04); Gareth Hughes (05); Catherine Delahunty (06); Kennedy Graham (07); Julie Anne Genter (08); Mojo Mathers (09); Jan Logie (10); David Clendon (11); James Shaw (12); Denise Roche (13); Steffan Browning (14)	Winston Peters (01); Tracey Martin (02); Richard Prosser (03); Fletcher Tabuteau (04); Barbara Stewart (05); Clayton Mitchell (06); Denis O'Rourke (07); Pita Paraone (08); Ron Mark (09); Darroch Ball (10); Mahesh Bindra (11)	Marama Fox (02)

==== Unsuccessful list candidates ====
National	Maureen Pugh, Misa Fia Turner, Wayne Walford, Simeon Brown, Hamish Walker, Lewis Holden, Karl Varley, Chris Penk, Linda Cooper, Letitia O'Dwyer, Mark Bridges, Boris Sokratov, Matthew Evetts, Carolyn O'Fallon, Charlotte Littlewood
Labour	Maryan Street, Moana Mackey, Raymond Huo, Priyanca Radhakrishnan, Rachel Jones, Carol Beaumont, Tāmati Coffey, Liz Craig, Deborah Russell, Willow-Jean Prime, Jerome Mika, Tony Milne, Ginny Andersen, Claire Szabó, Michael Wood, Arena Williams, Hamish McDouall, Anjum Rahman, Sunny Kaushal, Christine Greer, Penny Gaylor, Janette Walker, Richard Hills, Shanan Halbert, Anahila Suisuiki, Clare Wilson, James Dann, Kelly Ellis, Corrie Haddock, Jamie Strange, Katie Paul, Steven Gibson, Chao-Fu Wu, Paul Grimshaw, Tracey Dorreen, Tofik Mamedov, Hikiera Toroa, Hugh Tyler, Susan Elliot, Simon Buckingham
Green	Marama Davidson, Barry Coates, John Hart, David Kennedy, Jeanette Elley, Jack McDonald, David Moorhouse, Sea Rotmann, Richard Leckinger, Umesh Perinpanayagam, Susanne Ruthven, Teresa Moore, Dora Roimata Langsbury, Tane Woodley, Chris Perley, Rachel Goldsmith, John Kelcher, Daniel Rogers, Richard Wesley, Anne-Elise Smithson, Malcolm McAll, Chris Ford, Reuben Hunt, Paul Bailey, Caroline Conroy, Sue Coutts, Paul Doherty, Maddy Drew, Shane Gallagher, Peter Hill, Ruth Irwin, Henare Kani, Gavin Maclean, Nicholas Mayne, Ian McLean, Robert Moore, Sarah Roberts, Colin Robertson, Dave Robinson, Mark Servian, Dorthe Siggaard, Brett Stansfield, Gary Stewart, Mua Strickson-Pua, Patricia Tupou
NZ First	Ria Bond, Mataroa Paroro, Romuald Rudzki, Jon Reeves, Asenati Lole-Taylor, Brent Catchpole, George Abraham, Ray Dolman, Hugh Barr, Anne Degia-Pala, Steve Campbell, Edwin Perry, Bill Gudgeon, Brent Pierson, Aaron Hunt, John Hall, Richard Taurima, Grant Ertel, Cliff Lyon, Bill Woods
Conservative	Colin Craig, Christine Rankin, Garth McVicar, Melissa Perkin, Edward Saafi, Callum Blair, Mel Taylor, Steve Taylor, Roy Brown, Paul Young, Donald Aubrey, Brian Dobbs, John Stringer, Anton Heyns, Michael Brunner, Brent Reid, Deborah Cunliffe, Philip Lynch, Howard Hudson, Elliot Ikilei
Māori Party	Chris McKenzie, Te Hira Paenga, Ngaire Button, Nancy Tuaine, Tame Iti, Eraia Kiel, Anaru Kaipo, Raewyn Bhana, Rangimarie Naida Glavish, Aroha Reriti-Crofts, Hinurewa Te Hau, Tom Phillips, Verna Ohia-Gate, Ann Kendall, Hiria Pakinga, Claire Winitana, Ra Smith, Lenis Davidson, Tania Mataki, Sheryl Gardyne, Te Whe Ariki Phillips, Benita Wakefield
Internet Mana	Hone Harawira, Laila Harré, Annette Sykes, John Minto, Chris Yong, Miriam Pierard, Te Hāmua Nikora, David Currin, James Papali'i, Beverley Ballantine, Angeline Greensill, Gil Ho, Pat O'Dea, Pani Farvid, Makelisi Ngata, Patrick Salmon, Tangi Tipene, Roshni Sami, Joe Carolan, Callum Valentine, Sitaleki Finau, Grant Keinzley, Joe Trinder, Lois McClintock, Ariana Paretutanganui-Tamati, Robert Stewart, Lisa Gibson, Raymond Calver, Heleyni Pratley, Andrew LePine, Roger Fowler, Yvonne Dainty
ACT	Jamie Whyte, Kenneth Wang, Robin Grieve, Beth Houlbrooke, Don Nicolson, Stephen Berry, Dasha Kovalenko, Gareth Veale, Ian Cummings, Sara Muti, Toni Severin, Phelan Pirrie, Stephen Fletcher, David Olsen, Nick Kearney, Sean Fitzpatrick, Richard Evans, Michael Milne, Ron Smith, Tim Kronfeld, Shane Atkinson, Mike Burrow, Bruce Carley, Tom Corbett, Alan Davidson, Tommy Fergusson, Paul Gilbert, James Gray, Shaun Grieve, Bruce Haycock, Paul Hufflett, Peter Juang, Duncan Lennox, Kath McCabe, Craig Nelson, Colin Nichols, Grae O'Sullivan, Joanne Reeder, Geoff Russell, John Thompson, Neil Wilson
Legalise Cannabis	Julian Crawford, Abe Gray, Emma-Jane Kingi, Alistair Gregory, Jeffrey Lye, Richard Goode, Romana Manning, Rob Wilkinson, Jamie Dombroski, Sandy Mulqueen, Adrian McDermott, Ant Heath, Paul McMullan
United Future New Zealand	Alan Simmons, Damian Light, Sultan Eusoff, Ben Rickard, Jason Woolston, Dave Stonyer, Bryan Mockridge, Quentin Todd, James Maxwell, Sam Park
Ban 1080	Mike Downard, Bill Wallace, Peter Salter, James Veint, Glen Tomlinson, Patricia Cheel, Mike McClunie, John Burrill, Andy Blick
Democrats	Stephnie de Ruyter, Chris Leitch, John Pemberton, Katherine Ransom, Warren Voight, Alida Steemson, Hessel van Wieren, Andrew Leitch, Jason Jobsis, James Knuckey, Carolyn McKenzie, Robin Columbus, Dick Ryan, Harry Alchin-Smith, Mischele Rhodes, Hahona Rakiri Tamati, Barry Pulford, Peter Adcock-White, Tracy Livingston, David Wilson, Huia Mitchell, John McCaskey, John Ring, Miriam Mowat, David Espin, Heather Marion Smith, Gary Gribben, Adrian Bayly, Tim Leitch, Ron England, Kelly Balsom, Errol Baird, Karl Hewlett, Kerry Balsom, Robert Richards
Civilian	Ben Uffindell, Lucy-Jane Walsh, Marcus Gower, Michael Topp, Katie O'Neill, Harry Berger, Tim McLeod, Kim Downing
Independent Coalition	Brendan Horan, Michael O'Neill, Pat Spellman, Joanne Rye-McGregor, Jack Keogh, Barjindar Singh, Karl Barkley, Wal Gordon, Rick Pollock, Giovanni Mollo
Focus	Ken Rintoul, Les King, Terry Oakley, John Vujcich, Hayden Flintoff, Ranjit Singh, Julian Fairlie, Christie Gordon

=== Changes in MPs ===
In total, 23 new MPs were elected to Parliament and 4 former, non-sitting MPs returned. Eight MPs stood and were not re-elected.

In addition Bill English went from being an electorate MP to a list MP, while Kelvin Davis went from being a list MP to an electorate MP.

Among the new MPs was 24-year-old Todd Barclay, elected for National in Clutha-Southland, who became not only the youngest MP in the new Parliament, but also the first New Zealand MP to be born in the 1990s. As a comparison, he was only 4 months old when outgoing Clutha-Southland MP Bill English was first elected at the 1990 election.

New MPs

Darroch Ball, Todd Barclay, Andrew Bayly, Mahesh Bindra, Chris Bishop, Matt Doocey, Sarah Dowie, Marama Fox, Peeni Henare, Brett Hudson, Barbara Kuriger, Clayton Mitchell, Todd Muller, Jono Naylor, Parmjeet Parmar, Shane Reti, Adrian Rurawhe, Jenny Salesa, Alastair Scott, David Seymour, James Shaw, Stuart Smith, Fletcher Tabuteau

Returning MPs

Ron Mark, Stuart Nash, Pita Paraone, Carmel Sepuloni

Defeated MPs

Carol Beaumont, Hone Harawira, Brendan Horan, Raymond Huo, Asenati Taylor, Moana Mackey, Maryan Street, Holly Walker (Electorate only, not the Green Party List)

=== Demographics of elected MPs ===
Attribute	Number	Change
Gender
Male	83	▲1
Female	38	▼1
Ethnicity
European & other	83	▼5
Māori	25	▲3
Pacific	8	▲2
Asian	5	0
Date of birth/Generation
1945 or earlier ("Silent Generation")	2	
1946 to 1965 ("Baby Boomer")	65	
1966 to 1985 ("Generation X")	53	
1986 or later ("Millennial")	1	▲1

=== Electoral expenses ===
The Electoral Commission released party electoral expense returns on 23 February 2015, stating how much each party spent on campaigning between 20 June and 19 September 2014. Candidate only expenses were excluded.

Party	Campaign expenditure	Expenditure per party vote
National	$2,558,212	$2.26
Conservative	$1,914,072	$19.95
Green	$1,291,420	$5.02
Labour	$1,269,299	$2.10
Internet Mana	$1,008,926	$29.59
ACT	$294,406	$17.64
NZ First	$268,530	$1.29
Māori Party	$202,562	$6.36
Independent Coalition	$80,142	$91.91
Democrats	$43,514	$25.15
Ban 1080	$32,376	$6.33
Focus	$18,470	$28.90
United Future New Zealand	$1,995	$0.38
Legalise Cannabis	$1,169	$0.11
Civilian	$59	$0.05
Total/Average	$8,985,158	$3.74

== Post-election events ==
=== Leadership changes ===
On 30 September 2014, Labour leader David Cunliffe stepped down and forced a party leadership election. Andrew Little won leadership of the Labour Party,

=== Local by-elections ===
Two sitting mayors of local councils were elected: Jono Naylor (National) of Palmerston North City and Ron Mark (NZ First) of Carterton District. Both announced they would stand down as mayors if elected to Parliament, resulting in by-elections being called in Palmerston North and Carterton.

Nominations for the Palmerston North mayoral by-election close on 22 December 2014, with the by-election taking place on 10 February 2015 if needed. Carterton's incumbent deputy mayor, John Booth, was elected mayor unopposed on 28 October 2014.

=== Financial market reaction ===
Within an hour of the New Zealand Exchange opening on Monday 22 September, the headline NZX 50 Index jumped 1.27%, led by the country's five main electricity generator-retailers: Contact Energy, Genesis Energy, Meridian Energy, Mighty River Power and TrustPower. During the previous Parliament, the National Party partially privatised Genesis, Meridian and Mighty River, reducing the Crown's share from 100% to 51%. In response, the Labour and Green parties promised to reform the wholesale electricity market if elected, which would have provided cheaper retail prices by cutting how much generators could profit off their wholesale prices.

=== Election offences ===
Under section 197(1g) of the Electoral Act 1993, it is illegal for any person to publish anything that may influence voters to vote in a particular way between 00:00 and 19:00 on election day. The rule applies equally to traditional media and social media, and those found breaking the rule can be fined up to $20,000. After the election, 24 people were caught out by the rule and referred to Police. Among those were former All Black Jonah Lomu, current All Black Israel Dagg, and Olympic rowing medallist Eric Murray, who were caught tweeting their support for the National Party during the gag period.

A complaint was made against the Civilian Party for failure to include a promoter statement on their Facebook page as required by section 204F of the Electoral Act. Ben Uffindell, Party Leader, noted that the omission of the promoter statement was inadvertent and immediately placed a promoter statement onto the page after being instructed to do so by the Electoral Commission.
