= Liz Craig =

New Zealand politician and Member of Parliament

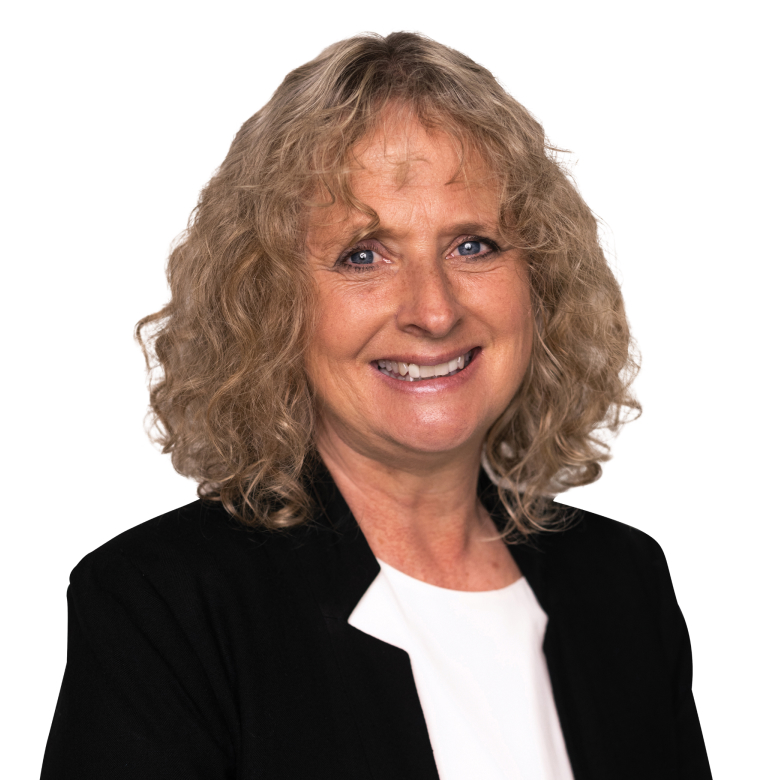
- Craig in 2023

Parliamentary Private Secretary to the Minister of Health
- In office 3 May 2022 – 27 November 2023
- Prime Minister: Jacinda Ardern; Chris Hipkins
- Minister: Andrew Little; Ayesha Verrall

Member of the New Zealand Parliament for Labour party list
- In office 23 September 2017 – 14 October 2023

Personal details
- Born: 1967 (age 58–59)
- Party: Labour (2010–present)
- Spouse(s): David Craig Philip Melgren (m. 2020)
- Children: 2

Elizabeth Dorothy Craig (born 1967) is a New Zealand politician of the Labour Party. She served as a Member of Parliament from 2017 to 2023. As a public health physician before entering Parliament, she is known for her research work on child poverty.

== Early life and family ==
Craig was born in 1967 and received her secondary education at Spotswood College in New Plymouth. She left New Plymouth at the age of 18 to attend medical school in Auckland. She was married to David Craig for 27 years, with whom she has two children. In January 2020 she married Philip Melgren.

Prior to the 2014 election, she lived in Dunedin. For the 2014 election, the family split its time between Dunedin and Romahapa in The Catlins. In 2016, when her selection for the Invercargill electorate was confirmed, she started looking for a house in Invercargill and has lived there since.

== Public health career ==
Craig is a public health doctor and child poverty advocate. In 2009, she won a $50,000 Dunedin School of Medicine's research development investment award, and she established a child and youth health policy research unit with that funding. She was the director of the New Zealand Child and Youth Epidemiology Service of the University of Otago. In 2012, she warned that New Zealanders had to get used to poor children suffering from Third World diseases. She was part of a group that compiled an annual child poverty monitor, and the group has been credited with making the issue one of the core topics of the 2017 election. Craig resigned as director from the research group, and as editor of the child poverty monitor, prior to the 2014 election.

== Political career ==
New Zealand Parliament
| Years | Term | Electorate | List | Party |
|---|---|---|---|---|
| 2017–2020 | 52nd | List | 31 | Labour |
| 2020–2023 | 53rd | List | 41 | Labour |

Craig stressed that her political views were formed through her work on child poverty, and "not the other way around". She joined the Labour Party in 2010 and was a contributing author of Labour's children's policies for the 2011 and 2014 elections. She stood for Labour in the Clutha-Southland electorate in the 2014 election, placing second. Ranked 32 on the Labour list, she was not returned on the list either.

In May 2016, she was selected unopposed to contest the Invercargill electorate at the 2017 election. Craig was placed 31 on Labour's party list. Craig lost the electorate to incumbent Sarah Dowie, but entered parliament via the Party list. In her first term, she was a member of the health, environment and regulations review committees.

During the 2020 election, Craig contested the Invercargill electorate but lost to National candidate Penny Simmonds by 224 votes. Craig had trailed by 685 votes in the preliminary results, causing speculation that she could win the seat when the special votes were counted. Despite this defeat, Craig was able to remain in Parliament via the Labour Party list.

Craig was chair of the health select committee from 2020 to 2022 when she was appointed the Parliamentary Private Secretary for Health.

During the 2023 New Zealand general election, she contested Invercargill for a third time. She came second place to National candidate Penny Simmonds, who won by a margin of 10,945 votes. Due to her low ranking on the Labour Party list, she was not re-elected to Parliament.
