= Joseph Mooney (New Zealand politician) =

New Zealand politician (born 1979)

Joseph Mooney MP
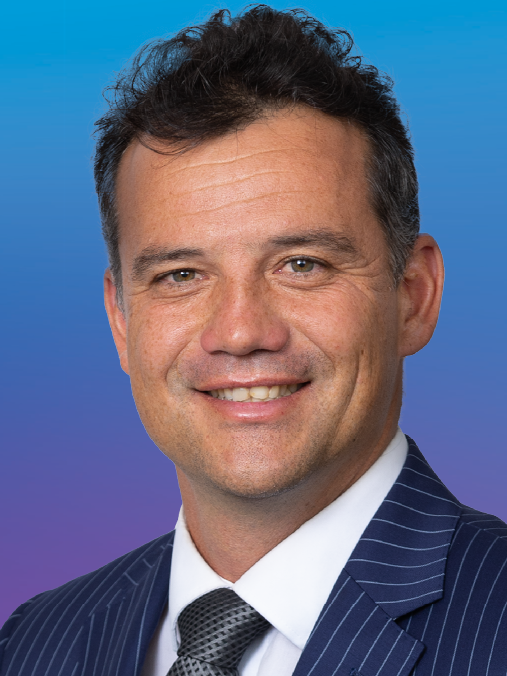
- Mooney in 2023

Member of the New Zealand Parliament for Southland
- Incumbent
- Assumed office 17 October 2020
- Preceded by: Hamish Walker (for previous electorate Clutha-Southland)

Personal details
- Born: 1979 (age 46–47)
- Party: National
- Spouse: Silvia
- Children: 3
- Profession: Lawyer

Joseph Mooney (born 1979) is a New Zealand politician. In 2020 he was elected as a Member of Parliament in the House of Representatives for the National Party in the Southland electorate.

== Early life and career ==
Mooney is originally from Hawke's Bay and grew up in poverty. At the age of 11, he and his younger brother left home and lived on the streets of Wellington for a week. He dropped out of high school without any qualifications and worked in a range of areas including "orchards, forestry, fishing boats, building sites, retail stores, and skifields". However, he later went to university where he obtained an honours degree in law. He became a senior trial lawyer and later a member of the Southland Branch Council of the New Zealand Law Society. In 2017 he was appointed by the Deputy Solicitor-General to the Crown Prosecution Panel for the Invercargill Crown Solicitor. He is also a court-appointed Youth Advocate.

Mooney has been a volunteer firefighter and army reservist.

== Political career ==
New Zealand Parliament
Years	Term	Electorate	List	Party
2020–2023	53rd	Southland	62	National
2023–2026	54th	Southland	53	National
2026–present	55th	Southland	49	National

=== First term, 2020–2023 ===
Mooney was selected as the National Party candidate for the new Southland electorate in July 2020, following Hamish Walker's decision to leave Parliament after he admitted that he had leaked private patient information to the media. Mooney won preference over journalist Olivia Caldwell and Dunedin restaurant manager Matthew French. At the 2020 general election, he was elected to the Southland seat by a margin of 5,645 votes over Labour Party candidate Jon Mitchell. Labour, however, won the party vote in the electorate, with 38.7%. Mooney has identified the first issue he intended to deal with as an MP will be to get more seasonal workers "on the ground" to address the fruit-picking "crisis" in Central Otago. Mooney was one of five new National Party MPs in the 53rd Parliament.

From November 2020, Mooney served as National Party spokesperson for Treaty of Waitangi negotiations and associate spokesperson for defence. Since December 2021, after Christopher Luxon became the party leader, Mooney has additionally been spokesperson for water and space. He served as a member of the Māori Affairs Committee and was also a member of the Regulations Review Committee from December 2021 to August 2022.

In April 2023, National Party leader Christopher Luxon said Mooney had got it wrong after he made comments on social media about Te Tiriti o Waitangi, saying on Twitter that Te Tiriti o Waitangi promised tino rangatiratanga to every person in New Zealand. Dame Claudia Orange, who has written extensively about Te Tiriti o Waitangi, said Mooney appeared to be subscribing to the old politics of former National leader, Don Brash. “That's just kind of one way that Don Brash tended to argue, and it's really got no substance to it, if you looked at why [tino rangatiratanga] was included in the Treaty and the effect that it actually gave Māori in terms of recognising their mana,” she said.

=== Second term, 2023–2026 ===
During the 2023 New Zealand general election, Mooney retained his Southland electorate seat by a margin of 17,211 votes.

=== Third term, 2026–present ===
During the 2026 New Zealand general election, Mooney contested Southland again for National. He was ranked 49th on the National Party list. He retained Southland by a large margin of 11,484 votes.

== Personal life ==
Mooney and his wife Silvia have three children. He is an enthusiast of skiing and mountain biking. Former Labour MP Bill Fox is his great-great uncle.

New Zealand Parliament
New constituency	Member of Parliament for Southland; 2020–present	Incumbent
