= One New Zealand Party =

Defunct New Zealand political party

One New Zealand
- Founded: 1999
- Dissolved: 2006
- Ideology: Conservatism; Hansonism; Right-wing populism
- Political position: Right-wing

The One New Zealand Party was a small political party in New Zealand. It was partly modelled on the Australian One Nation party, founded by Pauline Hanson. Its primary focus was on matters such as the Treaty of Waitangi, but its wider platform was broadly paleoconservative or producerist. It strongly opposed the policies of the government at the time, accusing it of giving special privileges to Māori and of undermining the concept of "one law for all". It claimed that the policies amount to a form of apartheid.

People involved with the party included Richard Fisher, John Porter, and Alan McCulloch, a former mayor of East Coast Bays.

One New Zealand was founded in 1999, and in the 1999 election, it won 0.06% of the vote. It had the shortest party list of any party in that election, with only one person, Walter Boyd. In the 2002 election, it won 0.09% of the vote. In the 2005 election, it won 0.02% of the vote.

In 2006, the party went into recess pending a decision as to whether the party would continue. In September, it was deregistered at its own request.

== Electoral history ==
=== Parliament ===
Election	# of seats won	# of party votes (Note: For the 1993 election this is the national popular vote. For subsequent elections this is the party list vote.)	% of party vote	Government or opposition
1999	0 / 120	1,311	0.06% #18	Extra-parliamentary
2002	0 / 120	1,782	0.09% #13	Extra-parliamentary
2005	0 / 120	478	0.02% #18	Extra-parliamentary

== See also ==
- 1Law4All Party (2013–2015)
- Hobson's Pledge (2016–present)
