= Focus NZ =

Focus New Zealand
- President: Les King
- Founded: 2012
- Dissolved: 2016
- Headquarters: Northland, New Zealand
- Ideology: Populism; Agrarianism; Economic nationalism

Focus NZ was a political party in New Zealand. Founded as "NZ Rural", the party was based in Northland and represented the interests of business owners, producers and provincial communities. Areas of concern include the exchange rate and empowerment of communities.

== History ==
On 22 August 2012 the party applied to register a logo with the Electoral Commission. The logo was approved on 24 September 2012.

Original logo of the NZ Rural Party

The party held its first meeting on 24 November 2012, during which it decided to change its name to "Focus New Zealand" in order to reach out to urban supporters.

The Party stood candidates in the 2013 local body elections in the Far North District Council and Whangarei District Council

The party was registered on 29 January 2014. The logo of the party was changed at the same time.

The party contested the 2014 general election. It received 639 votes, making it the least successful of the fifteen registered parties in that election.

On 22 February 2016 the party's registration was cancelled at its own request.

== Electoral results ==
Election	# of candidates nominated (electorate/list)	# of seats won	# of party votes	% of popular vote
2014	2/8	0 / 121	639	0.03%
