= Southland (electorate) =

- Single-member general constituency for the New Zealand House of Representatives
- Interactive map of boundaries from the 2026 election
- Formation: 2020
- Region: Otago and Southland
- Character: Rural
- Term: 3 years

Member for Southland
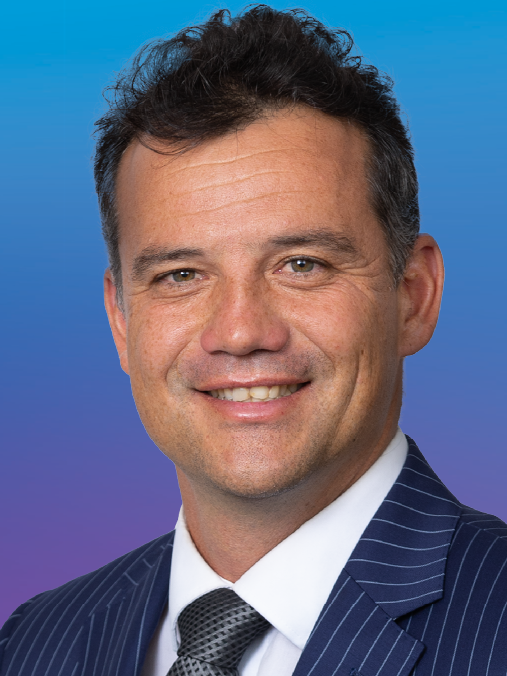
- Joseph Mooney since 17 October 2020
- Party: National
- List MPs: Todd Stephenson (ACT)
- Previous MP: null
Party vote distribution

Southland is an electorate to the New Zealand House of Representatives. It was first created for the 2020 New Zealand general election and has since then been held by Joseph Mooney of the National Party.

== Population centres ==
Map of boundaries at the 2020 and 2023 general elections

Despite its name, the electorate straddles the border between the Southland and Otago regions. It is the second-largest general electorate in New Zealand, behind West Coast-Tasman, and is predominantly rural in nature. The electorate includes Gore, Winton, Mataura, Alexandra, Arrowtown, Queenstown and Te Anau (among others), and much of Fiordland National Park. In the 2025 boundary review, the electorate's boundary with Invercargill would be moved east of the Ōreti River, transferring away the communities west of Winton.

== History ==
The Southland electorate emerged at the 2020 redistribution after the Clutha region moved out of the former electorate of Clutha-Southland. It comprised the bulk of Clutha-Southland, plus another area around Alexandra that had been moved in from Waitaki. The Representation Commission initially proposed to move Winton and The Catlins into Invercargill, but after a public consultation process these areas remained in Southland, which instead shed a large area in West Southland around Tuatapere.

The incumbent from the Clutha-Southland electorate, Hamish Walker, announced in July 2020 that he would not contest the Southland electorate. Later that month, the National Party selected Joseph Mooney as their candidate for this safe National seat. Mooney was elected by a margin of 5,645 votes over Labour Party candidate Jon Mitchell.

=== Members of Parliament ===
Key National

| Election | Winner |
|---|---|
| 2020 election | Joseph Mooney |
| 2023 election | Joseph Mooney |

=== List MPs ===
Members of Parliament elected from party lists in elections where that person also unsuccessfully contested the Southland electorate. Unless otherwise stated, all MPs terms began and ended at general elections.

| Election | Winner |
|---|---|
| 2023 election | Todd Stephenson |

== Election results ==
=== 2026 election ===
The next election will be held on 7 November 2026. Candidates for Southland are listed at Candidates in the 2026 New Zealand general election by electorate § Southland. Official results will be available after 27 November 2026.

=== 2023 election ===
2023 general election: Southland
| Notes: | Blue background denotes the winner of the electorate vote. Pink background denotes a candidate elected from their party list. Yellow background denotes an electorate win by a list member, or other incumbent. A ✓ or ✗ denotes status of any incumbent, win or lose respectively. | | | | | | |
| Party | Candidate | Votes | % | ±% | Party votes | % | ±% |
|---|---|---|---|---|---|---|---|
| National | ✓ Joseph Mooney | 23,231 | 58.89 | +7.29 | 19,222 | 48.25 | +12.18 |
| Labour | Simon McCallum | 6,020 | 15.26 | –21.72 | 6,546 | 16.43 | –22.42 |
| Green | Dave Kennedy | 3,860 | 9.78 | +4.29 | 3,482 | 8.74 | +3.60 |
| ACT | Todd Stephenson | 2,807 | 7.11 | – | 5,412 | 13.58 | +0.88 |
| NZ Loyal | Logan Evans | 2,172 | 5.50 | – | 974 | 2.44 | – |
| Legalise Cannabis | Anntwinette Grumball | 687 | 1.74 | – | 217 | 0.54 | +0.16 |
| Vision NZ | Naomi Maclean | 228 | 0.57 | – | | | |
| NZ First | | | | | 2,258 | 5.66 | +3.65 |
| Opportunities | | | | | 810 | 2.03 | +0.47 |
| NewZeal | | | | | 246 | 0.61 | +0.41 |
| Te Pāti Māori | | | | | 190 | 0.47 | +0.32 |
| Freedoms NZ | | | | | 91 | 0.22 | – |
| Animal Justice | | | | | 65 | 0.16 | – |
| DemocracyNZ | | | | | 60 | 0.15 | – |
| New Nation | | | | | 35 | 0.08 | – |
| New Conservatives | | | | | 32 | 0.08 | –1.41 |
| Women's Rights | | | | | 28 | 0.07 | – |
| Leighton Baker Party | | | | | 20 | 0.05 | – |
| Informal votes | | 437 | | | 148 | | |
| Total valid votes | | 39,442 | | | 39,836 | | |
| National hold | Majority | 17,211 | 43.63 | +31.81 | | | |

=== 2020 election ===
2020 general election: Southland
| Notes: | Blue background denotes the winner of the electorate vote. Pink background denotes a candidate elected from their party list. Yellow background denotes an electorate win by a list member, or other incumbent. A ✓ or ✗ denotes status of any incumbent, win or lose respectively. | | | | | | |
| Party | Candidate | Votes | % | ±% | Party votes | % | ±% |
|---|---|---|---|---|---|---|---|
| National | Joseph Mooney | 19,975 | 51.60 | — | 14,244 | 36.07 | — |
| Labour | Jon Mitchell | 14,330 | 36.98 | — | 15,341 | 38.85 | — |
| Green | David Kennedy | 2,127 | 5.49 | — | 2,085 | 5.14 | — |
| Opportunities | Joel Rowlands | 880 | 2.27 | — | 616 | 1.56 | — |
| New Conservative | Fiona Meyer | 664 | 1.71 | — | 588 | 1.49 | — |
| Advance NZ | Robert Wilson | 508 | 1.31 | — | 373 | 0.94 | — |
| Social Credit | Elisabeth Dacker | 139 | 0.36 | — | 39 | 0.09 | — |
| ONE | Judith Terrill | 130 | 0.34 | — | 78 | 0.19 | — |
| ACT | | | | | 5,016 | 12.70 | — |
| NZ First | | | | | 794 | 2.01 | — |
| Legalise Cannabis | | | | | 151 | 0.38 | — |
| Māori Party | | | | | 60 | 0.15 | — |
| Outdoors | | | | | 56 | 0.14 | — |
| Sustainable NZ | | | | | 25 | 0.06 | — |
| Heartland | | | | | 8 | 0.02 | — |
| Vision NZ | | | | | 7 | 0.02 | — |
| TEA | | | | | 6 | 0.02 | — |
| Informal votes | | 679 | | | 164 | | |
| Total valid votes | | 39,432 | | | 39,651 | | |
| Turnout | | 39,651 | 86.5 | — | | | |
| National win new seat | Majority | 5,645 | 14.62 | | | | |
