= Botany (New Zealand electorate) =

- Single-member general constituency for the New Zealand House of Representatives
- Interactive map of boundaries from the 2026 election
- Formation: 2008
- Region: Auckland Region
- Character: Suburban
- Term: 3 years

Member for Botany
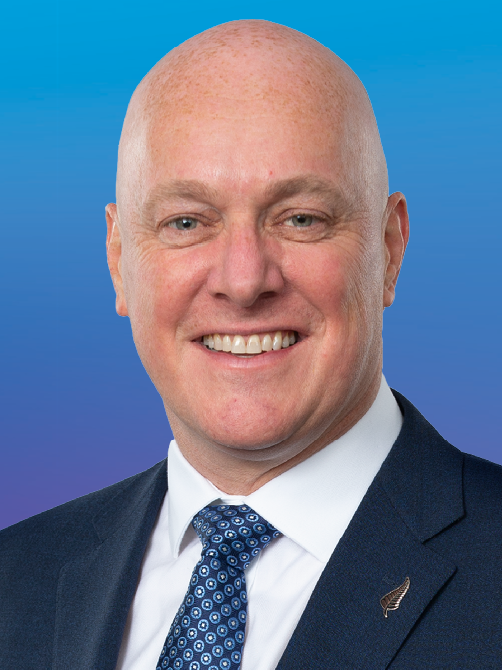
- Christopher Luxon since 17 October 2020
- Party: National
- Previous MP: Jami-Lee Ross (Ind)
Party vote distribution

Botany is a New Zealand parliamentary electorate, returning one Member of Parliament to the New Zealand House of Representatives. It was contested for the first time at the 2008 general election, and won by Pansy Wong for the National Party. Following Wong's resignation in late 2010, a by-election returned Jami-Lee Ross, who was confirmed by the voters in the 2011 general election. Ross left the National Party in October 2018 and became an independent. Ross did not contest the seat at the 2020 general election, and was succeeded by the new National candidate, Christopher Luxon, who became the party's leader in November 2021 and has served as prime minister since November 2023.

== Background ==
The Representation Commission established the electoral district of Botany after the 2006 New Zealand census due to high population growth in and around Auckland. The new electorate resulted from several sweeping changes to the electoral landscape of South Auckland:

- The southern end of Port Waikato was lanced and combined with the area around Clevedon township to form Hunua.
- The resultant change pulled the Clevedon electorate tighter around the city of Papakura for which the electorate is now named.
- In the north, Manukau East was pulled up through Otahuhu into Auckland City, in the process dropping the western suburbs of Flat Bush, East Tāmaki, Dannemora and Botany Downs, which combined with fragments of the Clevedon and Pakuranga electorates to form Botany.

== Population centres ==
Map of boundaries at the 2020 and 2023 general elections

The electorate is located in East Auckland and includes the suburbs of Botany, Botany Downs, Somerville, Northpark, Huntington Park, Golflands, Burswood, Dannemora, Shamrock Park, East Tāmaki, East Tāmaki Heights, Highbrook and Flat Bush. In the 2025 boundary review, the electorate would gain Mission Heights from Takanini, and the coastal and rural communities of Whitford, Beachlands and Maraetai from Papakura, while transferring Cockle Bay and Shelly Park to Pakuranga, and Clover Park to Otahuhu.

== Demographics ==
Demographically, Botany is older than the rest of New Zealand, with over half of its population aged over 30. Asian New Zealanders make up a plurality of the electorate (44.9%) nearly three times the national average, and nearly twice as many Pasifika New Zealanders (13 to 8.1%), which makes Botany a minority-majority electorate. Botany has the highest proportion of people born overseas of any New Zealand electorate (53.9% in 2018), the most Buddhists in a New Zealand electorate, the lowest proportion of residents who do not speak English (10.8%) of the general electorates, and the highest number of one-family homes. The average income in the electorate is high, with over half of the electorate's residents earning over $50,000 a year.

A 2005 academic survey assessing the voting behaviour of Asian New Zealanders showed a strong preference for the Labour Party, with a sizeable proportion prepared to vote for the National Party (47 to 40); it also showed that among Asian New Zealanders, the most important issues were the economy and law and order. This was demonstrated by a large anti-crime march (a crowd of 15,000 was estimated, with a significant number of these being Asian New Zealanders) was held in Auckland (on the streets of Botany) in July 2008 amidst claims of increasing violent crime in New Zealand targeted against its Asian population. The march's organiser Peter Low used his website to clarify his position, calling for harsher sentencing, victims' rights and zero "criminal rights".

== History ==
Botany was first created for the 2008 general election, and won by Pansy Wong for the National Party.

Both National and the ACT party stood Chinese New Zealanders as their candidates in 2008; Pansy Wong and Kenneth Wang, respectively. Labour chose Koro Tawa, an Auckland University lecturer. Raymond Huo, a Chinese-speaking lawyer, was initially mooted for the Labour nomination, but eventually chose to stand as a list-only candidate.

On 14 December 2010 it was announced that a by-election was to be held on 5 March 2011 due to the resignation of incumbent MP Pansy Wong. The electorate was won by Jami-Lee Ross from the New Zealand National Party.

In October 2018, Jami-Lee Ross resigned from the National Party and accused party leader Simon Bridges of breaching electoral law. Ross announced his intention to resign from parliament and run as an independent in the resulting by-election, however he later decided against resigning. Christopher Luxon won the National Party selection in November 2019.

On 15 September 2020 Ross announced he was no longer intending to contest the electorate, but will instead contest the upcoming election as a list only candidate for his newly formed party, Advance NZ. Luxon won the seat at the 2020 election as Ross was ejected from Parliament.

== Members of Parliament ==
Key

National Independent

Election	Winner
2008 election	Pansy Wong
2011 by-election	Jami-Lee Ross
2011 election	Jami-Lee Ross
2014 election	Jami-Lee Ross
2017 election	Jami-Lee Ross
2020 election	Christopher Luxon
2023 election	Christopher Luxon

=== List MPs ===
Members of Parliament elected from party lists in elections where that person also unsuccessfully contested the Botany electorate. Unless otherwise stated, all MPs' terms began and ended at general elections.

Key

Labour ACT

Election	Winner
2020 election	Naisi Chen
2020 election	Damien Smith

== Election results ==
=== 2026 election ===
The 2026 election was held on 7 November. Candidates for Botany are listed at Candidates in the 2026 New Zealand general election by electorate § Botany. Official results will be available after 27 November.

=== 2023 election ===
2023 general election: Botany
Notes:	Blue background denotes the winner of the electorate vote. Pink background denotes a candidate elected from their party list. Yellow background denotes an electorate win by a list member, or other incumbent. A ✓ or ✗ denotes status of any incumbent, win or lose respectively.						
Party	Candidate	Votes	%	±%	Party votes	%	±%
National	✓ Christopher Luxon	24,769	66.57	+14.11	22,239	58.74	+21.69
Labour	Kharag Singh	8,432	22.66	−18.77	7,708	22.27	−25.21
ACT	Bo Burns	1,959	5.26	+1.85	2,788	7.36	+0.56
NZ Loyal	John Armstrong	624	1.67	—	280	0.73	—
Animal Justice	Robert McNeil	428	1.15	—	98	0.25	–
New Conservative	Dieuwe de Boer	300	0.80	−0.92	86	0.22	−1.44
Green					2,212	5.84	+2.56
NZ First					1,136	3.00	+1.57
Opportunities					439	1.15	+0.33
Te Pāti Māori					188	0.49	+0.30
NewZeal					156	0.41	+0.18
Freedoms NZ					127	0.33	–
Legalise Cannabis					106	0.28	+0.08
New Nation					37	0.09	–
DemocracyNZ					29	0.07	–
Women's Rights					27	0.07	–
Leighton Baker Party					12	0.03	–
Informal votes		692			189		
Total valid votes		37,204			37,857		
National hold	Majority	16,337	43.91	+33.38			

=== 2020 election ===
2020 general election: Botany
Notes:	Blue background denotes the winner of the electorate vote. Pink background denotes a candidate elected from their party list. Yellow background denotes an electorate win by a list member, or other incumbent. A ✓ or ✗ denotes status of any incumbent, win or lose respectively.						
Party	Candidate	Votes	%	±%	Party votes	%	±%
National	Christopher Luxon	19,017	52.46	–9.17	13,970	37.05	−23.78
Labour	Naisi Chen	15,018	41.43	+16.81	17,900	47.48	+18.30
ACT	Damien Smith	1,236	3.41	+2.46	2,563	6.80	+6.20
New Conservative	Dieuwe De Boer	624	1.72	—	624	1.66	+1.40
Sustainable NZ	Peter Fleming	358	0.99	—	26	0.07	–
Green					1,236	3.28	+0.89
NZ First					541	1.43	−3.14
Opportunities					237	0.63	−0.19
Advance NZ					159	0.42	–
TEA					152	0.40	–
ONE					85	0.23	–
Legalise Cannabis					76	0.20	+0.05
Māori Party					70	0.19	−0.37
Vision NZ					40	0.11	–
Outdoors					15	0.04	±0.00
Heartland					5	0.01	–
Social Credit					4	0.01	±0.00
Informal votes		1,264			261		
Total valid votes		36,253			37,703		
Turnout		37,964	73.83	+1.20			
National hold	Majority	3,999	10.53	−26.48			

=== 2017 election ===
2017 general election: Botany
Notes:	Blue background denotes the winner of the electorate vote. Pink background denotes a candidate elected from their party list. Yellow background denotes an electorate win by a list member, or other incumbent. A ✓ or ✗ denotes status of any incumbent, win or lose respectively.						
Party	Candidate	Votes	%	±%	Party votes	%	±%
National	✓ Jami-Lee Ross	21,378	61.63	−2.21	21,428	60.83	+1.41
Labour	Tofik Mamedov	8,539	24.62	+1.72	10,279	29.18	+6.99
Green	Julie Zhu	2,103	6.06	—	841	2.39	−1.95
Māori Party	Wetex Kang	1,165	3.36	—	195	0.55	+0.34
United Future	Damian Light	500	1.44	—	33	0.09	−0.06
ACT	Sam Singh	330	0.95	—	209	0.59	−1.81
NZ First					1,612	4.58	−0.84
Opportunities					288	0.82	—
Conservative					91	0.26	−4.25
Legalise Cannabis					54	1.53	+1.26
People's Party					44	0.12	—
Outdoors					14	0.04	—
Mana Party					12	0.03	—
Internet					9	0.02	—
Ban 1080					6	0.02	−0.02
Democrats					2	0.01	—
Informal votes		673			110		
Total valid votes		34,688			35,227		
Turnout		35,658	72.63	+0.78			
National hold	Majority	12,839	37.01	−3.93			

=== 2014 election ===
2014 general election: Botany
Notes:	Blue background denotes the winner of the electorate vote. Pink background denotes a candidate elected from their party list. Yellow background denotes an electorate win by a list member, or other incumbent. A ✓ or ✗ denotes status of any incumbent, win or lose respectively.						
Party	Candidate	Votes	%	±%	Party votes	%	±%
National	✓ Jami-Lee Ross	21,044	63.84	−0.19	20,016	59.42	−1.71
Labour	Tofik Mamedov	7,549	22.90	−2.45	7,473	22.19	−1.59
Conservative	Paul Young	3,053	9.26	+1.57	1,519	4.51	+1.83
Independent	David McCormick	668	2.03	+2.03			
NZ First					1,825	5.42	+1.02
Green					1,461	4.34	−0.06
ACT					808	2.40	+0.75
Internet Mana					204	0.61	+0.36 (Note: 2014 Internet Mana swing is relative to the votes for Mana in 2011; it shared a party list with Internet in the 2014 election.)
Legalise Cannabis					90	0.27	−0.02
Māori Party					71	0.21	−0.08
United Future					49	0.15	−0.17
Ban 1080					12	0.04	+0.04
Independent Coalition					9	0.03	+0.03
Civilian					8	0.02	+0.02
Focus					6	0.02	+0.02
Democrats					5	0.01	−0.01
Informal votes		648			128		
Total valid votes		32,962			33,684		
Turnout		33,812	71.00	+3.25			
National hold	Majority	13,495	40.94	+2.26			

=== 2011 election ===
2011 general election: Botany
Notes:	Blue background denotes the winner of the electorate vote. Pink background denotes a candidate elected from their party list. Yellow background denotes an electorate win by a list member, or other incumbent. A ✓ or ✗ denotes status of any incumbent, win or lose respectively.						
Party	Candidate	Votes	%	±%	Party votes	%	±%
National	✓ Jami-Lee Ross	17,780	64.03	+7.81	17,749	61.13	−0.11
Labour	Chao-Fu Wu	7,039	25.35	+4.29	7,111	24.49	−0.69
Conservative	Paul Young	2,135	7.69	+7.69	777	2.68	+2.68
ACT	Lyn Murphy	631	2.27	−12.98	478	1.65	−3.19
United Future	Ram Parkash	185	0.67	−0.72	94	0.32	−0.37
NZ First					1,278	4.40	+2.26
Green					1,277	4.40	+2.01
Legalise Cannabis					85	0.29	+0.10
Māori Party					84	0.29	−0.02
Mana					72	0.25	+0.25
Libertarianz					13	0.04	+0.01
Alliance					9	0.03	+0.01
Democrats					7	0.02	+0.02
Informal votes		1,069			238		
Total valid votes		27,770			29,034		
National hold	Majority	10,741	38.68	+3.52			

Electorate (as at 26 November 2011): 43,204

=== 2011 by-election ===
Official results of the 5 March by-election.

2011 Botany by-election
Notes: Blue background denotes the winner of the by-election. Pink background denotes a candidate elected from their party list prior to the by-election. Yellow background denotes the winner of the by-election, who was a list MP prior to the by-election. A ✓ or ✗ denotes status of any incumbent, win or lose respectively.
Party	Candidate	Votes	%	±%
National	Jami-Lee Ross	8,352	54.25	-1.97
Labour	Michael Wood	4,380	28.45	+7.39
New Citizen	Paul Young	1,626	10.56	
ACT	Lyn Murphy	687	4.46	−10.80
Independent	Penny Bright	128	0.83	
Legalise Cannabis	Leo Biggs	61	0.40	
Independent	Wayne Young	54	0.35	
Join Australia	Robin Caithness	45	0.29	
Pirate	Hussain Al-saady	32	0.21	
Independent	Robert Goh	31	0.20	
Informal votes		25	0.16	
Total Valid votes		15,396	35.84	
National hold	Majority	3,972	25.76	-9.40

=== 2008 election ===
2008 general election: Botany
Notes:	Blue background denotes the winner of the electorate vote. Pink background denotes a candidate elected from their party list. Yellow background denotes an electorate win by a list member, or other incumbent. A ✓ or ✗ denotes status of any incumbent, win or lose respectively.						
Party	Candidate	Votes	%	±%	Party votes	%	±%
National	Pansy Wong	17,382	56.22		19,355	61.25	
Labour	Koro Tawa	6,510	21.06		7,958	25.18	
ACT	Kenneth Wang	4,717	15.26		1,528	4.84	
Green	Peter Cooper	1,226	3.97		756	2.39	
United Future	Judy Carter	428	1.38		220	0.70	
Progressive	Racheal Cheam	304	0.98		217	0.69	
Kiwi	Simon Kan	212	0.69		125	0.40	
Independent	Raj Subramanian	140	0.45				
NZ First					678	2.15	
Pacific					295	0.93	
Family Party					166	0.53	
Bill and Ben					98	0.31	
Māori Party					98	0.31	
Legalise Cannabis					62	0.20	
Workers Party					13	0.04	
Libertarianz					10	0.03	
Alliance					8	0.03	
RONZ					7	0.02	
RAM					6	0.02	
Democrats					2	0.01	
Informal votes		386			131		
Total valid votes		30,919			31,602		
National win new seat	Majority	10,872	35.16				
