= List of by-elections to the Auckland Council =

By-elections to the Auckland Council occur to fill vacant seats in the Council. The death, resignation, bankruptcy or expulsion of a sitting Councillor can cause a by-election to occur.

== List of by-elections ==
The following is a list of by-elections held to fill vacancies on the Auckland Council:

Key

| Independent | Citizens & Ratepayers | Labour | Auckland Future |

| Ward | Date | Incumbent | Cause | Winner |
|---|---|---|---|---|
| Howick | 2011 | Jami-Lee Ross | Resignation | Dick Quax |
| Maungakiekie-Tāmaki | 2018 | Denise Lee | Resignation | Josephine Bartley |
| Howick | 2018 | Dick Quax | Death | Paul Young |

=== Local board by-elections ===
Key

| Independent | Labour | Communities & Residents | Papatoetoe Otara Action Team | Team Franklin |

| Local board | Subdivision | Date | Incumbent | Cause | Winner | Ref. |
|---|---|---|---|---|---|---|
| Albert-Eden | Maungawhau | 2022 | Benjamin Lee | Resignation | Will McKenzie | |
| Aotea / Great Barrier | At-large | 2023 | Valmaine Toki | Resignation | Laura Caine | |
| Ōtara-Papatoetoe | Ōtara | 2023 | Swanie Nelson | Resignation | Lorenzo Kaisara | |
| Ōtara-Papatoetoe | Papatoetoe | 2026 | Paramjeet Singh | Election result for subdivision voided by court order | Vi Hausia | Link |
| Ōtara-Papatoetoe | Papatoetoe | 2026 | Sandeep Saini | Election result for subdivision voided by court order | Paramjeet Singh | Link |
| Ōtara-Papatoetoe | Papatoetoe | 2026 | Kushma Nair | Election result for subdivision voided by court order | Sandeep Saini | Link |
| Ōtara-Papatoetoe | Papatoetoe | 2026 | Kunal Bhalla | Election result for subdivision voided by court order | Kushma Nair | Link |
| Franklin | Wairoa | 2026 | Malcolm Bell | Resignation | Clare Alder | |

== Results ==
=== 2011 by-election, Howick ward ===
Howick ward by-election, 2011
| Party | Candidate | Votes | % | ±% |
|---|---|---|---|---|
| Citizens & Ratepayers | Dick Quax | 11,600 | 41.32 | |
| Independent | Maggie Burrill | 7,023 | 25.01 | |
| Independent | David Collings | 5,393 | 19.21 | |
| Independent | Penny Bright | 1,491 | 5.31 | |
| Independent | Wayne Young | 1,349 | 4.80 | |
| Independent | Ram Parkash | 1,116 | 3.97 | |
| Informal votes | | 37 | 0.13 | |
| Majority | | 4,577 | 16.30 | |
| Turnout | | 28,072 | 30.88 | |

=== 2018 by-election, Maungakiekie-Tāmaki ward ===
Maungakiekie-Tāmaki ward, 2018
| Party | Candidate | Votes | % | ±% |
|---|---|---|---|---|
| Labour | Josephine Bartley | 7,225 | 56.12 | |
| Auckland Future | Josh Beddell | 5,648 | 43.87 | |
| Informal votes | | 8 | 0.06 | |
| Majority | | 1,577 | 12.25 | |
| Turnout | | 12,873 | 24.85 | |

=== 2018 by-election, Howick ward ===
Howick ward by-election, 2018
| Party | Candidate | Votes | % | ±% |
|---|---|---|---|---|
| Independent | Paul Young | 7,631 | 27.20 | |
| Independent | Jim Donald | 5,830 | 20.78 | |
| Independent | Phil Taylor | 5,606 | 19.98 | |
| Independent | Damian Light | 5,501 | 19.61 | |
| Independent | Jessica Collings | 1,786 | 6.36 | |
| Independent | Olivia Montgomery | 1,671 | 5.95 | |
| Informal votes | | 25 | 0.08 | |
| Majority | | 1,801 | 6.42 | |
| Turnout | | 28,050 | | |
