= Jami-Lee Ross =

New Zealand politician

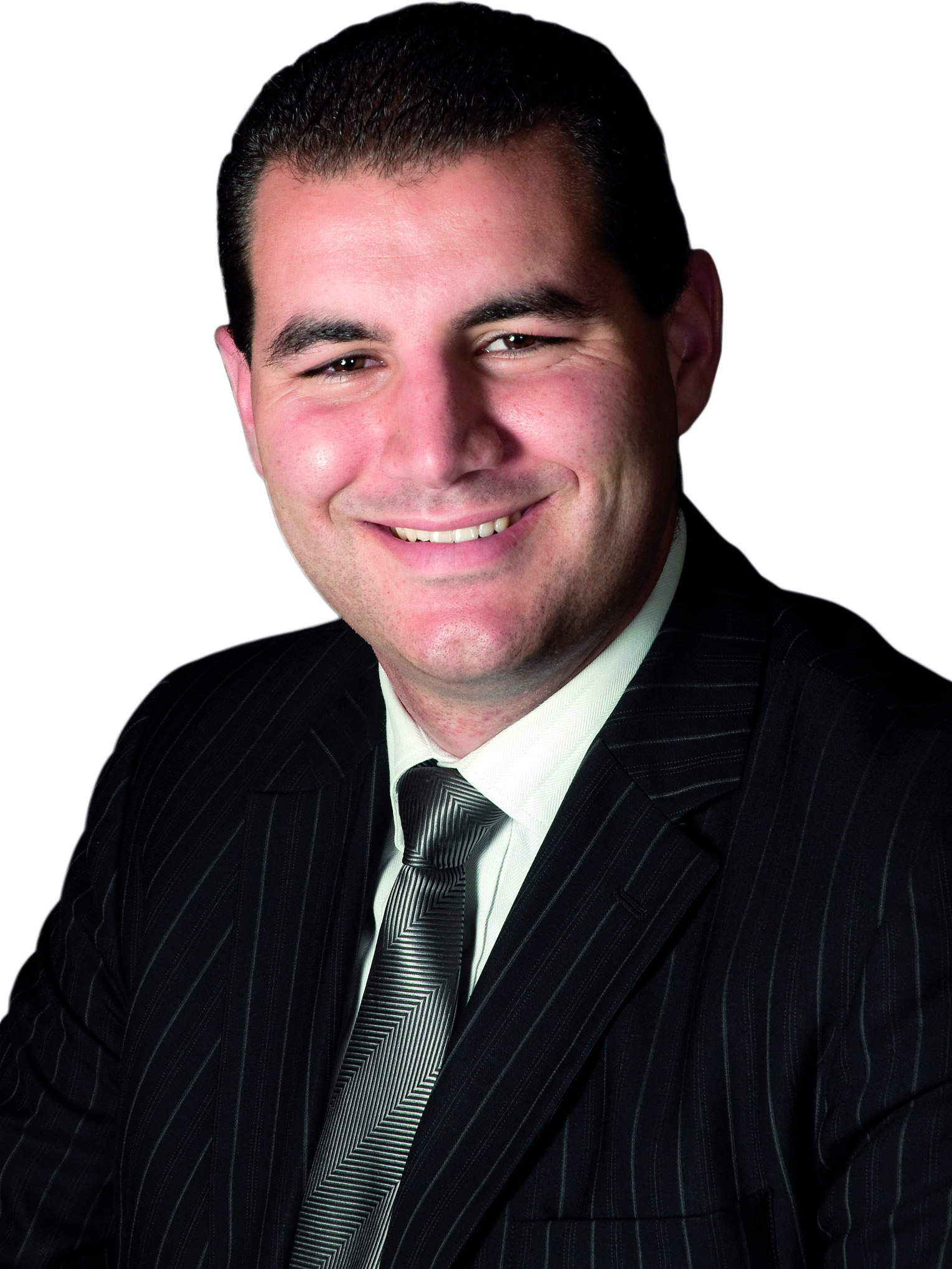
- Official portrait, 2011

Leader of Advance NZ
- In office 6 August 2020 – 19 August 2021

Chief Government Whip in the House of Representatives
- In office 2 May 2017 – 26 October 2017
- Prime Minister: Bill English
- Preceded by: Tim Macindoe
- Succeeded by: Ruth Dyson

Deputy Chief Government Whip
- In office 7 October 2014 – 2 May 2017
- Prime Minister: John Key; Bill English
- Preceded by: Tim Macindoe
- Succeeded by: Barbara Kuriger

Member of the New Zealand Parliament for Botany
- In office 5 March 2011 – 17 October 2020
- Preceded by: Pansy Wong
- Succeeded by: Christopher Luxon
- Majority: 12,840 (2017)

Howick ward councillor
- In office 31 October 2010 – 5 March 2011
- Preceded by: Position created
- Succeeded by: Dick Quax

Personal details
- Born: Jami-Lee Matenga Ross; 1985 (age 40–41) New Zealand
- Party: Advance New Zealand (2020–2021); Independent (2018–2020); National (2003–2018)
- Spouse: Lucy Schwaner (separated)
- Children: 2

Jami-Lee Matenga Ross (born 1985) is a New Zealand businessman and former politician. He was the Member of Parliament for Botany from a by-election in March 2011 until he lost his re-election bid at the 2020 general election.

Originally elected as a member of the New Zealand National Party, and having served as its chief whip during the final year of the Fifth National Government, Ross left the party in 2018 amid accusations of corruption, bullying, and sexual harassment. He sat in Parliament as an independent until 2020, when he formed the conspiracy theorist and electorally unsuccessful Advance New Zealand party. He was charged with electoral fraud in 2020 but found not guilty on the basis it was possible he had lied about his involvement in a donation-splitting scheme.

Prior to his parliamentary career, Ross had been a local government politician in Auckland on the Manukau City Council where he had been elected aged 18, from 2004 to 2010 and on the consolidated Auckland Council for five months from October 2010. As of 2023, his main occupation was running an escort service.

== Early life and family ==
Ross was brought up by his grandmother as his mother was "not in the best space to raise a child", and he has never met his father, who descends from the Māori iwi of Ngāti Porou. He was raised in Manukau City, first in Papatoetoe then Pakuranga after his grandmother shifted houses so Ross, a keen swimmer, could be closer to a pool. Ross boarded at Dilworth School, where he was a swimming champion, before changing to Pakūranga College but left without formal qualifications. He obtained a commercial pilot's licence, having trained at Ardmore Flying School. Later, he studied politics and economics at the University of Auckland but did not graduate.

He was married to Lucy Schwaner, a former member of the Howick Local Board, with whom he has two children. Their separation came after Ross had multiple extramarital relationships.

== Early political career ==
Auckland Council
Years	Ward	Affiliation
2010–2011	Howick	Citizens & Ratepayers

Ross joined the National Party in 2003. In 2004 he contested the Howick ward of the Manukau City Council as an 18-year-old and was elected alongside Sharon Stewart. He was re-elected for a second term in 2007, in which he chaired the performance and accountability committee.

As a councillor, Ross opposed the continuation of free entry to Manukau swimming pools. He supported the amalgamation of Auckland councils into a single authority proposed by the Royal Commission on Auckland Governance, in opposition to his own council's proposal of three medium-sized authorities. He self-described as a fiscal conservative and stated that his view that local government should not provide social services and these should be left to central government. In 2009, Ross led criticism of Manukau mayor Len Brown's use of council credit cards for personal spending. Ross himself was accused of seeking reimbursement for frivolous spending, including $14 for self-driving to an Anzac Day ceremony.

While a councillor, Ross was employed as an electorate secretary for Pakuranga MP Maurice Williamson.

He stood for a place on the new Auckland Council in the 2010 Auckland local elections, winning one of two Howick ward seats alongside former Manuakau City councillor colleague Sharon Stewart. Prior to the election, Ross had petitioned for a name change in the ward, which had originally been proposed to be called Te Irirangi after an historic chief. Ross called the proposed name "appalling" and "not appropriate." Ross joined the Citizens & Ratepayers ticket for the election and, after the election, became co-leader (with Christine Fletcher) of the five-strong bloc on council. He was appointed by Auckland mayor Len Brown to chair the tenders and procurement panel. In his maiden speech on the council, he pledged to "oppose overspending."

He resigned from Auckland Council on 7 March 2011, after being elected to Parliament in a by-election, and was succeeded by Citizens & Ratepayers candidate Dick Quax.

== Member of Parliament ==
New Zealand Parliament
Years	Term	Electorate	List	Party
2011	49th	Botany		National
2011–2014	50th	Botany	54	National
2014–2017	51st	Botany	29	National
2017–2018	52nd	Botany	27	National
2018–2020	Changed allegiance to:			Independent

A by-election in the Botany electorate was called when former Cabinet minister Pansy Wong resigned from Parliament in December 2010. Ross announced his candidacy on 15 December and, with the support of right-wing strategists Simon Lusk and Cameron Slater, was selected on 27 January 2011 over former broadcaster Maggie Barry. Ross's candidacy was criticised because he had only been elected to Auckland Council seven weeks earlier on a platform of cutting spending, and a by-election to replace him on the council would cost about $150,000.

Ross defeated Labour's Michael Wood in the 5 March 2011 by-election with a majority of 3,972. Upon his swearing into Parliament on 23 March, Ross became the youngest Member of Parliament, taking the informal title of Baby of the House from Green Party MP Gareth Hughes. His maiden speech, delivered on 6 April, outlined Ross's philosophy of limited government. Quoting Ronald Reagan's first inaugural address, he said: "government is not the solution to the problem; government is the problem." He also described socialism as a "failed experiment" and offered an analysis of the Treaty of Waitangi that concluded the Māori electorates were not necessary; this was consistent with his previous comments about Māori wards on Auckland Council.

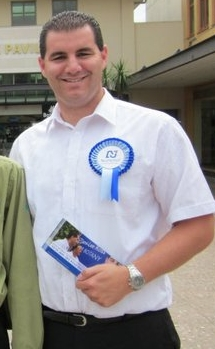
Ross campaigning in 2011

After his re-election as Botany MP at the 2011 general election, Ross was appointed a member of the Māori affairs committee and the transport and industrial relations committee. He also began to pick up more duties in the management of party affairs. In early 2013, he was appointed the third government whip. As early as that year, he also became more involved in party fundraising. Ross's Botany electorate was one of the country's most diverse and, as recently as 2008, had been described as an "Asian battleground" for votes with a large Chinese diaspora population making up a third of its total population. Ross developed connections within the Chinese community and was a "constant figure" at fundraising events, bringing in "big money" as the party's "bagman." During this term, he voted for the Marriage (Definition of Marriage) Amendment Bill, which legalised same-sex marriage in New Zealand.

He was promoted to junior whip after his re-election in Botany at the 2014 general election, and succeeded Tim Macindoe as senior whip in May 2017. He was the final person to hold the office of chief whip during the Fifth National Government. During this term, Ross sat on the foreign affairs committee and the finance and expenditure committee and promoted a member's bill intended to create an enforcement regime against roadside windscreen washers, which passed its first reading in April 2017 with support from both National and Labour before being adopted as part of a government bill that August. In 2016, with Todd Muller, he traveled to the United States with the International Democracy Union to view the Republican National Convention, which he described as "vicious [and] nasty." At the end of that year, he "ran numbers" for Bill English in the 2016 New Zealand National Party leadership election and led unsuccessful lobbying efforts within National for Simon Bridges to become English's deputy leader. Ross's support for English and Bridges was regarded as surprising because he had previously been viewed as an ally of Judith Collins, who had also been a leadership aspirant.

Ross contested the Botany seat for a fourth time during the 2017 election and was re-elected. During the election campaign he apologised for his sign-written vehicle being parked in a bicycle lane. After the formation of the Sixth Labour Government, he was appointed spokesperson for local government in the Bill English shadow cabinet, ranked 27. He supported Simon Bridges in the February 2018 New Zealand National Party leadership election and was ranked eighth within the Bridges shadow cabinet on 11 March, holding the transport and infrastructure portfolios and sitting as a National Party representative on the transport and infrastructure committee. Although this was the highest rank given to anyone who had not previously been a minister, Ross was disappointed with these appointments and later said that he had expected to be shadow leader of the house, chief whip, and housing spokesperson.

== Split with National ==
=== Simon Bridges expense scandal and corruption allegations ===
As transport spokesperson, Ross denounced the Labour government's plans to increase subsidies for electric vehicle purchases, to raise transport revenue for Auckland through a fuel tax, and to build light rail. He also leveled complaints against the Counties Manukau District Health Board of "unauthorised, excessive or unjustified" payments made to senior executives and alleged the board's then chief executive Stephen McKernan, later the acting director-general of health, was involved. McKernan was cleared after an investigation by the state services commissioner.

Through this period, Ross remained a confidante of Bridges. In mid-August 2018, Bridges' travel expenses were leaked to media and investigation was started. On 2 October 2018, Ross issued a statement that he was standing down from his portfolios and from the front bench of the Opposition due to personal health issues. His transport portfolio was picked up by Paul Goldsmith, and Judith Collins took over his infrastructure portfolio. Ross had denied being responsible for leaking the travel expenses but the investigation concluded two weeks later he was the leaker. Ross denied the accusations and issued a series of tweets alleging that Bridges had attempted to silence him for speaking out against his leadership decisions, including an election donation that allegedly broke the law. Bridges indicated that National would seek disciplinary action against Ross.

On 16 October, Ross gave further allegations relating to Bridges' apparent corruption. In a press conference, in which he also announced his resignation from the National Party and intention to resign from Parliament, he claimed Bridges had violated electoral law several times, including accepting an illegal NZ$100,000 donation from Chinese businessman Zhang Yikun, and denied allegations that he had sexually harassed several female staff (see § Bullying and sexual harassment allegations). He stated that he had not been on medical leave but had been forced to take leave by Bridges and deputy leader Paula Bennett as part of an apparent smear attempt. That same day, Ross was expelled from National for disloyalty. Bridges said the allegations of corruption were baseless and a matter for the police. Ross spoke with police the next day and soon after released an audio recording between himself and Bridges in which Bridges described National list MP Maureen Pugh as "fucking useless" and Ross and Bridges compared the value that Asian minority members of Parliament could bring from National's donors, with Ross saying "two Chinese MPs are better than two Indians." Ross and Zhang, but not Bridges, were eventually charged with electoral fraud (see § Electoral fraud investigation and trial).

=== Bullying and sexual harassment allegations ===
On 18 October Newsroom journalist Melanie Reid released an exclusive report, with four women accusing Ross of incoherent rages, harassment, and bullying behaviour. The women had spoken to Reid before the recent media publicity around Ross's conflict with his former National colleagues. Katrina Bungard, the former National candidate for Manurewa and a member of the Howick Local Board, identified herself as one of the four women. She alleged she had been harassed by Ross before and after a failed vote to install Ross's wife as the board chair in 2016. Bungard praised the way that National had dealt with the complaints and the other women for coming forward with the allegations. Ross indicated that he was seeking legal options but also admitted he had had two past extramarital affairs, including with a married MP later revealed to be Invercargill MP Sarah Dowie.

On 21 October, it was reported that Ross had been admitted to a mental health facility in Auckland by police having made a suicide attempt. He was discharged two days later. Ross later stated that his mental health crisis was triggered by a message Dowie had sent him two months earlier which contained the words "you deserve to die." Dowie was investigated by police for possibly breaching the Harmful Digital Communications Act 2015 but charges were not pursued. The police complaint that triggered the investigation was made anonymously and Ross denied he had made it. Ahead of her retirement from Parliament in 2020, Dowie claimed Ross orchestrated the investigation and deliberately used his mental health as a cover to seek revenge against her.

Further bullying and sexual harassment allegations were leveled at Ross in early February 2020. A Parliamentary Service investigation substantiated a number of complaints about Ross's behaviour towards staff, including the existence of a "toxic environment", sexualised comments towards female staff members and "lies and mind games". Further investigation revealed at least two sexual relationships between Ross and his staffers and that Ross would target staffers through repeated pressure, controlling behaviour, "incoherent rages" and "brutal sex". Ross denied any allegations of wrongdoing and claimed that the allegations against him were part of a "wider, politically-motivated attack."

While some commentary toward Ross called for him to be treated kindly in recognition of his mental health struggles, despite the way he treated others, political commentators described Ross as "a narcissistic and ruthless game-player" and "the most extreme example" of a young career politician with no real life experience outside of politics, who viewed House of Cards as a model for how to behave.

== Independent MP and Advance New Zealand ==
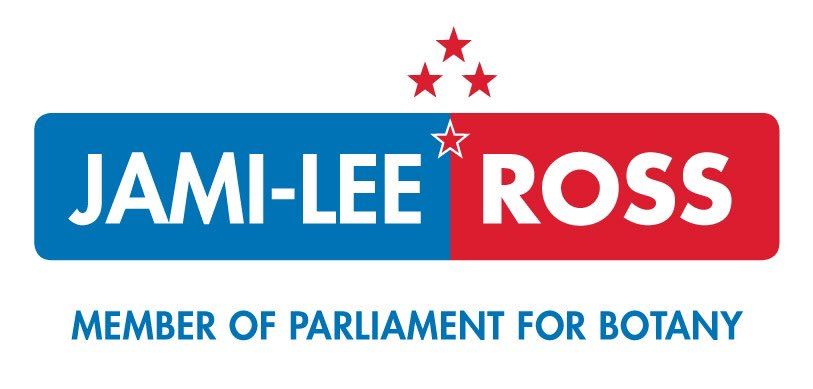
Jami-Lee Ross's branding as an independent politician drew inspiration from the party colours of National and Labour in an attempt to position himself in the political centre.

=== Return to Parliament ===
Despite announcing he would resign from Parliament in October 2018, Ross stayed on as an independent MP, albeit on medical leave until early 2019. National refused to use the Electoral (Integrity) Amendment Act 2018, which it had opposed, to expel him from Parliament but equally refused to use Ross's proxy vote in his absence. Instead, Ross's proxy vote was given to New Zealand First.

When Ross returned to Parliament in February 2019, he said he would focus on advocating for more funding for mental health and on electoral reform. Citing his experience in raising funds for the National Party, he claimed it was too easy to hide donations from foreigners by funnelling them through New Zealand-based companies and that "tens of thousands, or even hundreds of thousands, of dollars in donations are put through this way." In March, he called for all political donations from non-New Zealand citizens to be banned. Soon after, his police complaint concerning Simon Bridges' disclosure of political donations was referred to the Serious Fraud Office. In February 2020, Ross—not Bridges—was charged with electoral fraud (see § Electoral fraud investigation and trial).

Ross voted in favour of the End of Life Choice Bill in 2019 and the Abortion Legislation Bill in 2020.

=== 2020 general election ===
In April 2020, two months after being accused of further bullying and sexual harassment allegations (see § Bullying and sexual harassment allegations) and being charged with electoral fraud, and in anticipation of the general election called for that September, Ross declared that he would form a new political party, Advance New Zealand. The party was formally launched on 26 July and soon merged with Billy Te Kahika's conspiracy theorist party, the New Zealand Public Party, which opposed mandatory vaccination, 5G technology, 1080 poison, fluoridation, electromagnets, abortion, and United Nations action plans Agenda 21 and Agenda 30 on sustainable development. Ross described the coalition as "centrist."

In late August, Advance New Zealand published a Facebook video alleging that the New Zealand government was forcing citizens to get a COVID-19 vaccine. According to Agence France-Presse's Fact Check, key parts of speeches made by other MPs were cut out and edited to distort what they were saying. The video was controversial because it violated Parliamentary rules prohibiting the use of parliamentary debate videos for political campaigning. After Ross refused to remove the video, he was referred to Parliament's privileges committee by the Speaker of the House, Trevor Mallard. On 1 September, the privileges committee unanimously agreed that Ross had broken the rules by misusing edited parliamentary video for political adverting. Ross rejected the committee's decision, denouncing the committee as a "kangaroo court".

Ross had planned to re-contest Botany for Advance New Zealand in the October 2020 New Zealand general election but, one month before the election, announced he had pulled out of that race. Instead, Ross said he would campaign as a list-only candidate and focus on overall party strategy. In the event, neither Ross nor any other Advance New Zealand candidates were elected. The day after the election, Ross was interviewed by Newshub journalist Tova O'Brien, who criticised him for "peddling misinformation" about COVID-19 and challenged his decision to ally with Te Kahika. Ross also stated that he planned to rest after the election. The interview attracted international and national media coverage with journalist Glenn Greenwald describing it as "an absolute masterclass in interviewing a politician."

The final 17 days of Ross's failed campaign was portrayed in Tony Sutoris's 2023 fly-on-the-wall documentary Elements of Truth. It offered key insights into Ross's motives and rationales behind his alliance with Te Kahika and his movement, and the extent to which Ross truly believed the rhetoric espoused by the party that he co-led. Sutoris said that Ross views political parties as cults and politicians as salespeople who don't need to believe in the policies they are promoting. In the documentary, Ross said he probably was "not as open-minded" towards Te Kahika's approach to COVID-19 at the beginning of the campaign, "but over time, I've come to believe the stuff that we're talking about."

Advance New Zealand was deregistered in 2021 following legal and political disputes between Ross and Te Kahika (see Advance New Zealand § Election aftermath).

== Electoral fraud investigation and trial ==
On 12 March 2019, it was reported that the New Zealand Police had referred Ross's complaint about Simon Bridges' disclosure of political donations to the Serious Fraud Office (the SFO). Bridges denied any wrongdoing and asserted that it was a National Party matter rather than an investigation into himself.

On 29 January 2020 the SFO announced it had charged four people in relation to the claims made by Ross in 2018 around the $100,000 donation, none of whom were sitting National Party MPs. On 19 February 2020, it was reported that Ross was one of the four charged and the charges related to a NZ$105,000 donation made to the National Party in June 2018. The SFO alleged that Ross and the other defendants had committed fraud by splitting the 2018 donation into sums of money less than $15,000, which were then transferred into the bank accounts of eight different people before being donated to the National Party. On 25 February, Ross appeared in court where he pleaded not guilty to the charges relating to the National Party donations.

In late July 2022, Ross was one of seven defendants in a High Court case involving three donations made to the Labour and National parties between 2017 and 2018. Ross and his co-defendants were accused of assisting businessman Yikun Zhang with concealing electoral donations. The Crown accused Ross of serving as Zhang's insider within the National Party when the latter made two donations worth over NZ$100,000 in 2017 and 2018. Under the Electoral Act 1993, all donations worth more than NZ$15,000 must be reported to the Electoral Commission. The trial took ten weeks; Ross's defense was that he had lied to the SFO in order to save his political career and seek revenge against Bridges, and that the statements underpinning the Crown's case were unreliable. Zhang and two others were found guilty of fraud; the judge acquitted Ross on the grounds that it was possible that he was "so driven by a desire to take down Mr Bridges that he lied in the most compelling way he could imagine, that is by falsely stating he had carried out Mr Bridges' instructions."

== Later career ==
After leaving Parliament Ross began a business career. In 2020, he founded a company called Praesidium Life to sell a pseudoscientific medical treatment which he claims protects users from electromagnetic radiation. In 2022, he founded an escort agency called Sapphire Blue under the pseudonym Dylan Rose. As of March 2023 it employed over 20 women, most of whom have their ages listed as in their late teens and early twenties. Several of them have raised safety concerns.

Ross stood unsuccessfully for the Howick Local Board in the 2025 Auckland local board elections, as an independent candidate in the Flat Bush subdivision.

New Zealand Parliament
Preceded by Pansy Wong	Member of Parliament for Botany; 2011–2020	Succeeded by Christopher Luxon
