= 2011 Botany by-election =

New Zealand by-election

- 5 March 2011
- Turnout: 15,421 (36.20%)
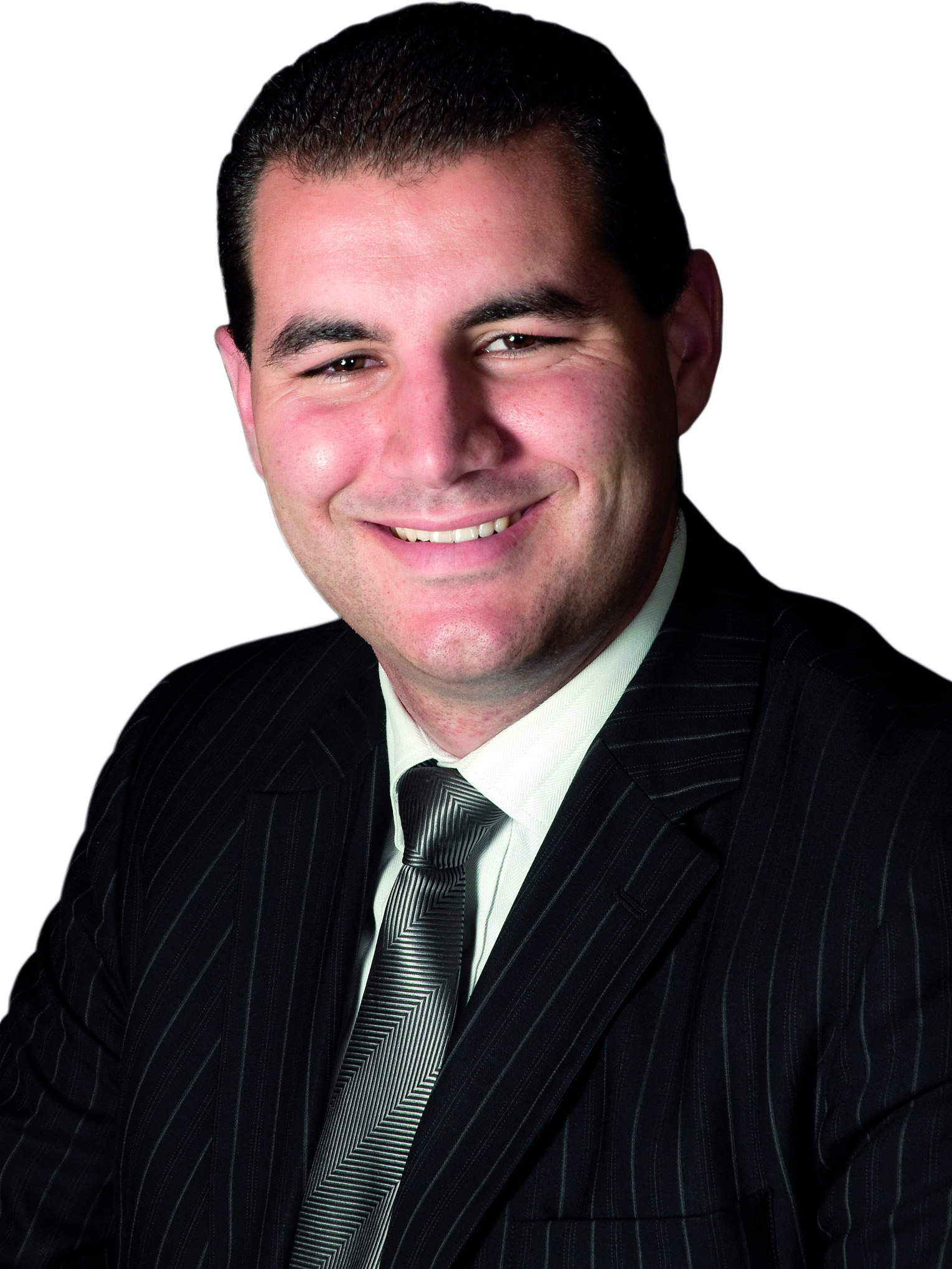

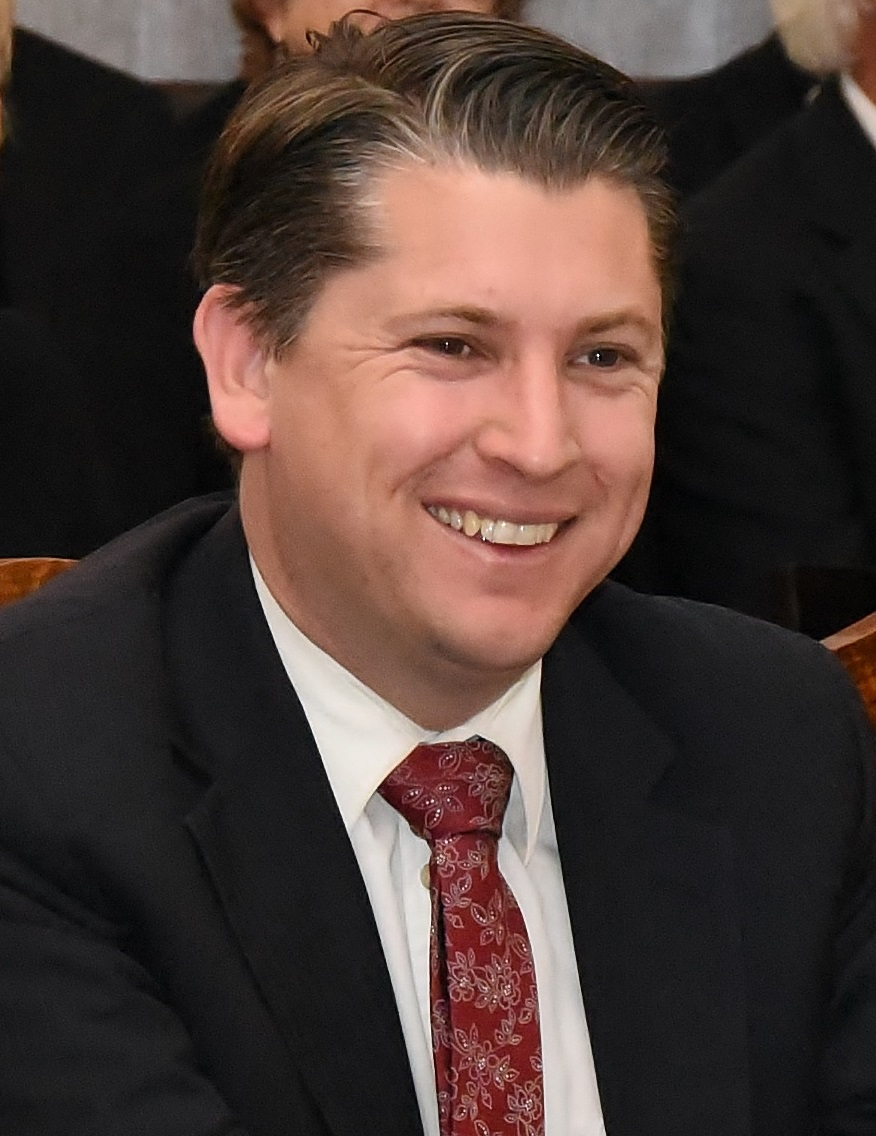

Candidate	Jami-Lee Ross	Michael Wood	Paul Young
Party	National	Labour	New Citizen
Popular vote	8,352	4,380	1,626
Percentage	54.16%	28.40%	10.54%
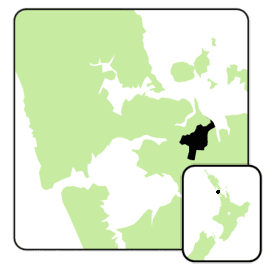
MP before election
Pansy Wong
National
Elected MP
Jami-Lee Ross
National

A by-election was held in the New Zealand electorate of Botany on 5 March 2011. The seat was vacated by former National Ethnic Affairs Minister Pansy Wong, who announced her resignation from the New Zealand Parliament on 14 December 2010 following allegations her husband Sammy had misused taxpayer money in relation to overseas travel.

The seat was won by Jami-Lee Ross, retaining the seat for the New Zealand National Party but with a 27% reduction in majority.

== Demographics and election history ==
The Botany electorate was created shortly before the 2008 election and is considered a safe National seat. A third of the population is born overseas and it has a large Chinese population.

Wong won the seat with 17382 (56.22%) votes in the 2008 general election. Labour candidate Koro Tawa was runner-up with 6510 (21.06%) and ACT's Kenneth Wang on 4717 (15.26%). Party votes were National 19355 (61.25%), Labour 7958 (25.18%) and Act 1528 (4.84%).

== Candidates ==
Nominations opened on 2 February and closed at noon on 8 February.

=== National Party ===
The National Party selected Jami-Lee Ross, a member of the Auckland Council representing Howick, as their candidate. He was selected from a shortlist of five candidates, the other four being former Auckland City councillor Aaron Bhatnagar, media presenter Maggie Barry, Elim Christian College teacher Darron Gedge, and health research scientist Edward Saafi.

A total of 13 people had initially put their names forward for the nomination. The list was not released, but was reported to include Denise Krum (a National Party official and former president of United Future), Ram Rai (a National Party official), Ken Yee (a former Manukau City councillor and unsuccessful candidate for Manukau East), Youngshin Watkins, and Daniel Newman. Other names that had been speculated included current list MP Melissa Lee (who had unsuccessfully contested the Mount Albert by-election earlier in the parliamentary term), party official Kit Parkinson, and Howick Local Board chairman Michael Williams.

=== ACT ===
ACT selected MIT lecturer and Counties Manukau DHB member Lyn Murphy.

=== Labour Party ===
The Labour Party selected Michael Wood, Puketapapa Local Board member, as their candidate. The other two people that contested the nomination were Roy Bootle and David Collings. Collings withdrew before the selection process was completed. Koro Tawa, who contested the seat in the previous general election had already been selected to contest it in the next one, was originally reported to be seeking the nomination for the by-election as well, but did not in the end.

=== Others ===
The Green Party selected Richard Leckinger, a former ministerial advisor and researcher at Parliament. However, he was stuck in traffic and could not submit the nomination form in time.

The Pirate Party selected Hussain Al-Saady, a recent university graduate.

The recently founded New Citizen Party selected businessman Paul Young.

Independents included veteran campaigner Penny Bright, translator and former candidate for Puketapapa Local Board Robert Goh, and former candidate for mayor Wayne Young.

== Campaign ==
Wood started the campaign by admitting to the local paper in Puketapapa he had no chance of winning. A week later, he told the local paper in Botany he hadn't given up yet. NZPA reported that the new New Citizen Party had put up more billboards than him. Wood claimed Ross was "too scared" to have a TV debate with him on the "big issues", while making a pledge "to drive penis lollies out of the community".

Meanwhile, National warned against being complacent and taking the election for granted.

Paul Young wanted 10% GST, "traditional values in the education system" and "respect for elders".

Bright again campaigned on her theme of open, transparent and democratically accountable governments. She condemned the planned partial privatisation of state assets, saying "partial privatisation is like partial pregnancy – there is no such thing".

Wayne Young, made homeless by the leaky homes crisis, wanted building standards to be strengthened.

The Pirate Party left its campaign to the last minute, handing out fliers at 6pm on the day before the election.

== Results ==
Official results as declared on Wednesday 16 March 2011 after special votes were counted. Ross resigned his seat on the Auckland Council on the Monday after the election.

2011 Botany by-election
Notes: Blue background denotes the winner of the by-election. Pink background denotes a candidate elected from their party list prior to the by-election. Yellow background denotes the winner of the by-election, who was a list MP prior to the by-election. A ✓ or ✗ denotes status of any incumbent, win or lose respectively.
Party	Candidate	Votes	%	±%
National	Jami-Lee Ross	8,352	54.25	-1.97
Labour	Michael Wood	4,380	28.45	+7.39
New Citizen	Paul Young	1,626	10.56	
ACT	Lyn Murphy	687	4.46	−10.80
Independent	Penny Bright	128	0.83	
Legalise Cannabis	Leo Biggs	61	0.40	
Independent	Wayne Young	54	0.35	
Join Australia	Robin Caithness	45	0.29	
Pirate	Hussain Al-saady	32	0.21	
Independent	Robert Goh	31	0.20	
Informal votes		25	0.16	
Total Valid votes		15,396	35.84	
National hold	Majority	3,972	25.76	-9.40

== Alleged illegal campaigning ==
New Zealand law prohibits campaigning on election day. It is alleged that the United Chinese Press newspaper published a front-page article on election day endorsing Paul Young. It is further alleged the paper ran an ad in the same edition for the New Citizen Party. The editor of the United Chinese Press insists the newspaper in question was printed on the day before, and therefore legal.
