= Sharon Stewart =

Sharon Stewart may refer to:

- Sharon Stewart (politician), New Zealand local politician in Auckland
- Sharon Stewart (athlete) (born 1965), Australian middle-distance runner
