= Damian Light =

New Zealand politician

Leader of United Future
- In office 23 August 2017 – 14 November 2017
- Deputy: Judy Turner
- Preceded by: Peter Dunne

Personal details
- Born: 31 October 1983 (age 43)
- Party: United Future (2002–2017)
- Domestic partner: Josh Harding
- Website: Official website

Damian Francis Light (born 31 October 1983) is a New Zealand politician who was the leader of the United Future party from August 2017 until the party's dissolution in November 2017. He became party leader following the resignation of Peter Dunne. Light had previously served as the president of the party. He was the first openly gay leader of a political party in New Zealand. Light later entered local politics, and in 2022 became the Chair of the Howick Local Board.

== Personal life ==
Light was born and raised in Auckland. He attended Rosmini College in Takapuna. He currently lives in Botany Downs, Auckland, with his partner, Josh Harding. He works as an improvement analyst at AsureQuality, and previously worked as a line manager at KiwiRail.

== Political career ==
Light stated that he was motivated to become involved in politics at the 2002 general election after seeing Peter Dunne's memorable television debate with the "worm". He first stood for parliament at the 2008 general election in the North Shore electorate and ranked 13 on United Future's party list. At the 2011 general election Light was again United Future's candidate for North Shore and was ranked 12 on the party list. In the 2014 general election Light was United Future's candidate for the Northcote electorate and ranked third on the party list. In the 2017 general election, Light was United Future's candidate for the Botany electorate, and first place on the party list.

Upon becoming party leader, Light stated he would prefer United Future to gravitate closer towards Labour than National as he claimed to possess a 'social conscience' and indicated his key area of policy concern was drug reform. After appearing in a televised debate on TVNZ 1, Light went viral on social media, being compared to Hollywood film star Ryan Gosling, with "Damian Light" trending on Twitter, and United Future's website crashing from an increased surge in internet traffic.

Light ran for the Auckland Council as an independent in the 2018 Howick ward by-election, placing fourth behind the winner, businessman Paul Young. He contested the ward again in the 2019 Auckland local elections and placed third behind the two winners, Young and Sharon Stewart, making him the highest ranked candidate in the ward to not be elected.

In 2022 Light stood for the council again unsuccessfully but was elected to the Howick Local Board for the Botany subdivision. Light became the Chair of the Board for the 2022-2025 term.

Light stood once again for Howick ward councillor and for re-election to the Howick Local Board at the 2025 Auckland Council elections. Light was re-elected to the Howick Local Board, but failed once again in his bid for Howick ward.

Party political offices
Preceded by Peter Dunne	Leader of United Future New Zealand; 2017	Party dissolved
