= Howick Youth Council =

- Founded: August 2011
- Type: Youth council, youth empowerment, youth voice
- Location(s): Howick, Pakuranga, Botany Downs and Ormiston
- Region served: East Auckland, New Zealand
- Affiliations: Howick Local Board
- Website: https://www.howickyouthcouncil.org.nz

The Howick Youth Council (HYC) is a youth voice organisation covering the region of the Howick Local Board in Auckland, New Zealand.

The council runs events in East Auckland, advocates on behalf of youth and facilitates Auckland Council consultation. Operating in the suburbs of Howick, Pakuranga, Botany Downs and Ormiston, the group represents the youth in the population of 140,000 people living in the boundaries of the Howick Local Board. Howick Youth Council's 3 main goals are to offer opportunities, represent, and empower the youth of East Auckland.

== Structure ==
The council has roughly three dozen members and functions on a team-based structure. There is a Leadership Team, 4 Project Teams, and a Communications Team. The Leadership Team consists of a Chairperson, Deputy Chairperson, a Council Community Lead, Secretary, Treasurer, and Communications Lead. The Project Teams aim at creating events to engage the youth of East Auckland. The Communications Teams aim at creating promotions for said events. The council is primarily funded by the Howick Local Board.

== History ==
The organisation was created by the Howick Local Board shortly following the board's first meeting, after the 2010 supercity amalgamation and formation of Auckland Council, with the group being founded in August 2011.

The youth council's inaugural meeting was held on 4 August 2011. The organisation was initially coined the "Howick Local Board Youth Council", with its portfolio initially assigned to Local Board member David Collings. The group gave its first deputation to the Howick Local Board on 12 December 2011. Following this, the youth council's work programme consisted of several events including a yearly "Youth Summit". The group has worked in advocating for a youth space in Howick, with a feasibility study commissioned and published in 2017.

In 2018, the council hosted a debate in the 2018 Howick ward councillor by-election. This was produced as part of a series on voter engagement which The New Zealand Herald pegged as "following the lead of [Chloe] Swarbrick". Stuff city hall reporter, Todd Niall, described the debates "as the most engaging campaign meeting I'd attended". A series of videos running on the youth council's Facebook page attained 5500 views. Later in 2019, the youth council advocated for further consultation on a proposed transit route in Pakuranga. The group did not take a position on the issue but presented to the Auckland Council's Governing Body. The youth council later presented to the Auckland Youth Advisory Panel on public transport fares.

The group has helped organise a variety of events including a youth film festival, youth awards, beach clean-up, and charity concert.

== See also ==
- Youth council
