= Maurice Williamson =

New Zealand politician

The Honourable Councillor Maurice Williamson
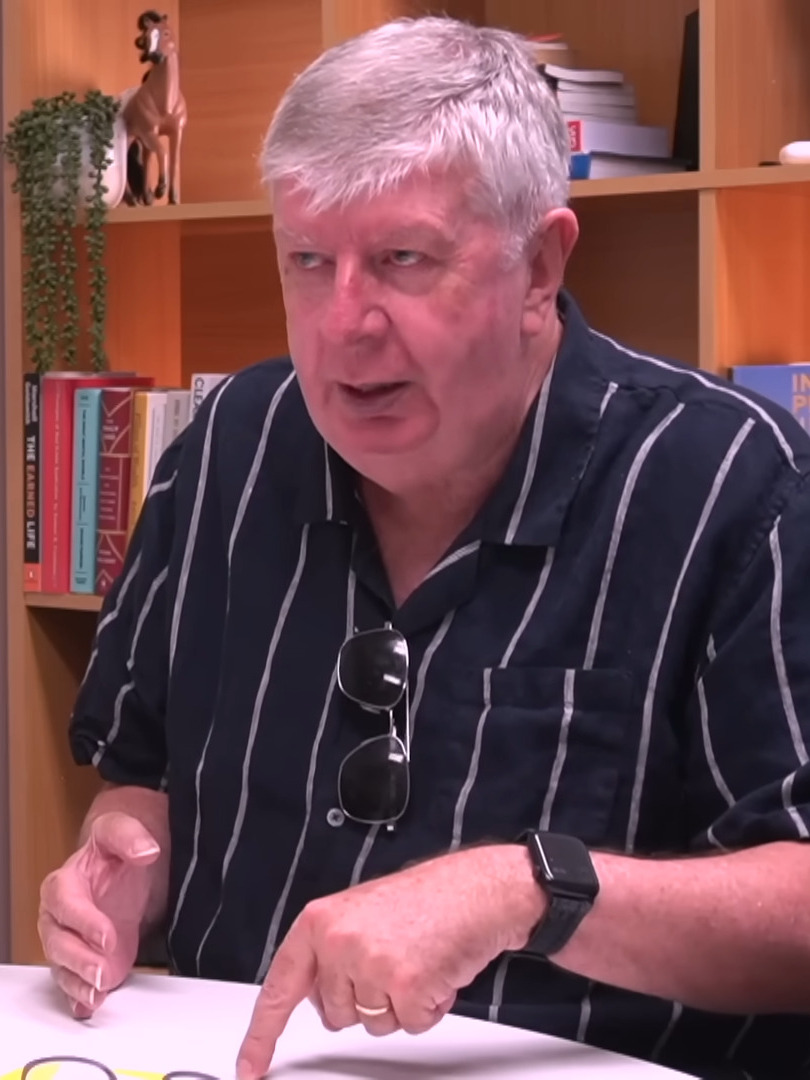
- Williamson in 2025

Howick Ward councillor
- Incumbent
- Assumed office 28 October 2022 Serving with Sharon Stewart
- Preceded by: Paul Young

60th Minister of Customs
- In office 19 November 2008 – 1 May 2014
- Prime Minister: John Key
- Preceded by: Nanaia Mahuta
- Succeeded by: Nicky Wagner

5th Minister for Building and Construction
- In office 19 November 2008 – 1 May 2014
- Prime Minister: John Key
- Preceded by: Shane Jones
- Succeeded by: Nick Smith

19th Minister of Statistics
- In office 19 November 2008 – 1 May 2014
- Prime Minister: John Key
- Preceded by: Darren Hughes
- Succeeded by: Nicky Wagner
- In office 1 July 1993 – 10 December 1999
- Prime Minister: Jim Bolger; Jenny Shipley
- Preceded by: Rob Storey
- Succeeded by: Paul Swain

Minister for Small Business
- In office 19 November 2008 – 12 December 2011
- Prime Minister: John Key
- Preceded by: Clayton Cosgrove
- Succeeded by: John Banks

Member of the New Zealand Parliament for Pakuranga
- In office 15 August 1987 – 23 September 2017
- Preceded by: Neil Morrison
- Succeeded by: Simeon Brown

Personal details
- Born: 6 March 1951 (age 75) Auckland, New Zealand
- Party: National
- Spouse: Raewyn
- Children: 3
- Education: University of Auckland
- Profession: Computer programmer

Maurice Donald Williamson (born 6 March 1951) is a New Zealand politician and former diplomat.

Williamson had a 30-year career as the National Party Member of Parliament for Pakuranga in the New Zealand House of Representatives. During this period, he was a minister in both the Fourth and Fifth National Governments, including as Minister of Transport, Minister of Broadcasting, Minister of Local Government, Minister of Customs and Minister of Statistics.

After retiring from Parliament, Williamson was New Zealand consul-general in Los Angeles from 2017 to 2021. He returned to politics in 2022, successfully contesting the Howick ward of Auckland Council.

== Member of Parliament ==
New Zealand Parliament
Years	Term	Electorate	List	Party
1987–1990	42nd	Pakuranga		National
1990–1993	43rd	Pakuranga		National
1993–1996	44th	Pakuranga		National
1996–1999	45th	Pakuranga	20	National
1999–2002	46th	Pakuranga	13	National
2002–2005	47th	Pakuranga	none	National
2005–2008	48th	Pakuranga	17	National
2008–2011	49th	Pakuranga	8	National
2011–2014	50th	Pakuranga	19	National
2014–2017	51st	Pakuranga	35	National

Williamson was a member of Parliament for the National Party, a centre-right political Party in New Zealand, as MP for Pakuranga since the 1987 general election. He held a number of ministerial posts, including Minister of Communications, Minister of Broadcasting, Minister of Transport, and Minister of Research, Science and Technology, and associate Minister of Health (1990–96). He was a strong supporter of reform of prostitution law.

His 2005 election campaign saw one of the strongest results for National across New Zealand.

=== Suspensions ===
He was suspended from caucus on 22 July 2003, after refusing to curtail his criticism of the National Party leader, Bill English, who he blamed for poor performance in the polls. After English was replaced by Don Brash, Williamson was reinstated. After his return from suspension, Williamson played an active role in National and was elevated up the ranks to eighth position in the National lineup in 2008.

On 1 May 2014, he resigned his ministerial portfolios after making what the Prime Minister, John Key, called, "A serious error of judgement." The Prime Minister was referring to a phone call Mr Williamson had made to the police enquiring about a charge they were laying against businessman and National Party donor Donghua Liu over domestic violence allegations. Williamson had told police he was not trying to interfere with the process – he just wanted to make sure somebody had reviewed the matter to ensure the police were on solid ground as "Mr Liu is investing a lot of money in New Zealand".

=== Candid remarks ===
Williamson became known for his candid remarks and humor which often attracted controversy. In 2011, he attracted controversy for making crude jokes during a speech addressing a conference audience. Speaking to a Samoan speaker, he joked about whether his "papers were in order". Later he said: "What is the difference between Muslims and Kiwis? Muslims get to commit adultery and get stoned, Kiwis get stoned and commit adultery". In 2015, Prime Minister John Key defended him as a "flamboyant" person with a "strong sense of humour" after Williamson was accused of making "sexist" remarks during another speech. He later apologised. Earlier in 2007, Williamson was slammed for an email he sent in response to a TV report on obesity: "If some people can't lose weight no matter what ... how come there were no fat people in the Nazi concentration camps?"

=== 49th and 50th New Zealand Parliaments ===
After the 2008 general election the National Party formed a minority government with three confidence and supply partners. Despite his high list placing, Williamson was not selected for cabinet due in part to a series of gaffes during the election campaign relating to the party's policy on road tolls. He was given ministerial responsibilities outside of cabinet for Customs, Building and Construction, Statistics and Small Business. One of the major matters under his governance was the ongoing leaky homes crisis, which he noted as having the government "stumped" due to its enormity.

In June 2009, Richard Worth left Parliament after Prime Minister John Key lost confidence in him as a minister over sexual allegations. Williamson was made the acting minister of Worth's portfolios of Internal Affairs, National Library and Archives New Zealand which were subsequently passed on to Nathan Guy.

After the election of the 50th Parliament of New Zealand Williamson was returned to his seat and re-appointed as a minister in the second term of the National-led government. Williamson retained his 2008 portfolios of Customs, Land Information and Building and Construction but lost the role of Minister for Small Business to John Banks as part of the new National-ACT Confidence and Supply deal. Williamson remained a minister outside of Cabinet, along with Jo Goodhew, Chester Borrows and Chris Tremain, until his resignation from all ministerial portfolios on 1 May 2014.

He announced that he would not stand for Parliament in the 2017 election.

=== Transport advocacy ===
In 2003, Williamson suggested that "cities have squandered fortunes upgrading their public transport only to find the car remains the mode of choice for most" and said local government subsidies should be axed for roading maintenance and public transport.

As a one-time Transport Minister and a local MP, Williamson has long supported and advocated for more motorway and roading projects. In 2005, he advocated for the Eastern Transport Corridor motorway to expand Auckland's motorway network, saying that the city was "grossly short" of motorways. As the National Party's transport spokesperson in the 2008 general election, he prompted controversy for supporting significant road tolls to enable new motorway construction projects.

In 2015, he advocated for two local roads in his Pakuranga electorate to be redesignated as state highways, as he felt Auckland Transport was prioritising public transport infrastructure too heavily in planning.

=== 'Big gay rainbow' speech ===
In April 2013, Williamson voted in favour of the Marriage (Definition of Marriage) Amendment Bill which legalised same-sex marriage, delivering a memorable speech prior to the third reading vote.

One of the messages that I had was that this bill was the cause of our drought. Well, in the Pakuranga electorate this morning, it was pouring with rain. We had the most enormous big gay rainbow across my electorate.

The speech was soon being referenced worldwide by news outlets and was chosen as 2013's quote of the year by Massey University. With Williamson's sarcastic and honest approach, the speech was viewed hundreds of thousands of times over the next few days, and featured on high-profile news sites like The Huffington Post and Gawker. Williamson said he had an offer to go on The Ellen DeGeneres Show, but had to turn it down due to rules around ministers accepting gifts. Williamson was later given approval by the prime minister to go on the show as long as he donated any money received to charity. Williamson's speech was praised by Opposition politicians and left-wing media commentators.

== Later career and return to politics ==
Auckland Council
Years	Ward	Affiliation
2022–present	Howick	Independent

After he announced his intention to leave parliament at the 2017 election, Williamson was appointed the New Zealand consul-general in Los Angeles in 2016. He took up the post the following year.

Williamson returned to the New Zealand political scene in 2022 by running for Auckland Council as one of the two councillors for the Howick Ward, which encompasses all of Williamson's former Pakuranga parliamentary electorate. Williamson ran on a ticket with sitting councillor Sharon Stewart, and in October 2022 Williamson and Stewart were both elected, defeating sitting Howick councillor Paul Young.

Auckland mayor Wayne Brown appointed Williamson to the chair of the expenditure control and procurement committee, charged with identifying cost savings. As a councillor, Williamson attracted criticism for his comments characterising posters promoting the use of te reo Māori as "objectionable" and for making comments "of a sexual nature" in relation to Wellington mayor Tory Whanau.

Williamson was re-elected as a councillor in the 2025 elections for the Howick ward.

New Zealand Parliament
Preceded by Neil Morrison	Member of Parliament for Pakuranga; 1987–2017	Succeeded by Simeon Brown
Political offices
Preceded by Richard Worth	Minister for Land Information; 2009–2014	Succeeded by Michael Woodhouse
