= Maungakiekie-Tāmaki Local Board =

Coordinates: 36.8987017°S 174.8546809°E

Maungakiekie-Tāmaki Local Board Te Poari ā-Rohe o Maungakiekie-Tāmaki
- Local board of Auckland Council
- Country: New Zealand
- Region: Auckland
- Territorial authority: Auckland Council
- Ward: Maungakiekie-Tāmaki ward
- Legislated: 2010

Area
  - Land: 36.47 km^{2} (14.08 sq mi)

Population (June 2025)
  - Total: 88,100

Local Board Members

Leadership
- Chairperson: Debbie Burrows, C&R
- Deputy chairperson: Tabetha Elliott, C&R

Structure
- Seats: 7
- Political groups: Communities and Residents (4); Labour (3)
- Length of term: 3 years

Elections
- Last election: 2025
- Next election: 2028

Meeting place
- 7-13 Pilkington Road, Panmure

The Maungakiekie-Tāmaki Local Board is one of the 21 local boards of the Auckland Council. It is the only local board overseen by the council's Maungakiekie-Tāmaki Ward councillor (some wards administer more than one local board).

The Maungakiekie-Tāmaki board, named after Maungakiekie / One Tree Hill and the Tamaki River estuary in the board area, covers the suburbs of Glen Innes, Mount Wellington, Onehunga, Oranga, Panmure, Penrose, Point England, Royal Oak, Southdown, Sylvia Park, Tamaki, Te Papapa, Wai o Taiki Bay, and Westfield.

The board is governed by seven board members elected from two subdivisions: three from the Maungakiekie subdivision (board area west of the Southern Motorway, excluding Westfield), and four from the Tāmaki subdivision (Westfield and board area east of the Southern Motorway). The first board members were elected with the nationwide local elections on Saturday 9 October 2010.

== Demographics ==
Maungakiekie-Tāmaki Local Board Area covers 36.47 km^{2} (14.08 sq mi), a slightly smaller area than the 40.39 km^{2} (15.59 sq mi) covered by the Maungakiekie-Tāmaki ward, as local board area and ward boundaries do not fully align. The local board area had a population of 78,102 at the 2023 New Zealand census, an increase of 1,818 people (2.4%) since the 2018 census, and an increase of 8,097 people (11.6%) since the 2013 census.

Historical population
Year	Pop.	±% p.a.
2006	66,372	—
2013	70,005	+0.76%
2018	76,284	+1.73%
2023	78,102	+0.47%

== 2025-2028 term ==
The current board members for the 2025–2028 term, elected at the 2025 local elections, are:

Name	Affiliation	Subdivision	Position
Debbie Burrows	Communities and Residents	Maungakiekie	Chairperson
Tabetha Elliott	Communities and Residents	Tāmaki	Deputy Chairperson
Maria Meredith	Labour	Tāmaki	Board member
Don Allan	Communities and Residents	Maungakiekie	Board member
Nerissa Henry	Labour	Tāmaki	Board member
Tony Woodcock	Communities and Residents	Maungakiekie	Board member
Dianna Fuka	Labour	Tāmaki	Board member

== 2022-2025 term ==
The board members for the 2022–2025 term, elected at the 2022 local elections, were:

Name	Ticket (if any)	Subdivision	Position
Maria Meredith	Labour	Tāmaki	Chairperson
Debbie Burrows	Communities and Residents	Maungakiekie	Deputy Chairperson
Don Allan	Communities and Residents	Maungakiekie	Board member
Nerissa Henry	Labour	Tāmaki	Board member
Chris Makoare	Labour	Tāmaki	Board member
Peter McGlashan	Labour	Tāmaki	Board member
Tony Woodcock	Communities and Residents	Maungakiekie	Board member

== 2019–2022 term ==
The board members for the 2019–2022 term, elected at the 2019 local body elections, were:

Name	Party	Votes
Maria Meredith	Labour	4269
Don Allan	C&R – Communities and Residents	4116
Nerissa Henry	Labour	4110
Peter McGlashan	Labour	3944
Chris Makoare	Labour	3940
Debbie Burrows	C&R – Communities and Residents	3760
Tony Woodcock	C&R – Communities and Residents	3394

== 2016–2019 term ==
The board members, elected at the 2016 local body elections or in a subsequent by-election, were:

Name	Party	Position
Chris Makoare	Labour	Chair
Don Allan		Deputy Chair
Debbie Burrows	Auckland Future	
Bernie Diver	Auckland Future	
Nerissa Henry	Labour	
Maria Meredith^{n1}	Labour	
Alan Verrall	Labour	

^{n1} This member was elected in a May 2018 by-election triggered when member Josephine Bartley was elected as a ward councillor.

== Election results ==
=== 2016 election results ===
==== Maungakiekie subdivision ====
Name	Party	Votes
Bernie Diver	Auckland Future	3183
Don Allan	nil	3032
Debbie Leaver	Auckland Future	2847
Hema Wihongi	Maungakiekie Community Voices	2537
Angelina Weir	Maungakiekie Community Voices	2364
Jacqueline Clark	Independent	2098
Chris Jenkin	Maungakiekie Community Voices	2000
Caroline Gray	Independent	1260
INFORMAL		10
BLANK		930

==== Tāmaki subdivision ====
Name	Party	Votes
Josephine Bartley	Labour	5161
Chris Makoare	Labour	4506
Nerissa Henry	Labour	4497
Alan Verrall	Labour	4227
Tony Smith	Independent	2946
Yvonne Dainty	Independent	2311
Barbara Shaw	Independent	2101
Patrick O'Meara	Independent	1173
Bryan Mockridge	United Future	1566
INFORMAL		22
BLANK		839

=== 2013 election results ===
==== Maungakiekie subdivision ====
Name	Party	Votes
Simon Randall	Maungakiekie Team	Elected Unopposed
Brett Clark	Maungakiekie Team	Elected Unopposed
Bridget Graham	Maungakiekie Team	Elected Unopposed

==== Tāmaki subdivision ====
Name	Party	Votes
Josephine Bartley	Labour	6194
Chris Makoare	Labour	5708
Alan Verral	Labour	5548
Obed Unasa	Labour	4392
Jocelyn Calvert	Independent	2587
Patrick O'Meara	Independent	2435
Yvonne Dainty	Independent	2125
Makelesi Ngata		1847
INFORMAL		14
BLANK		662

=== 2010 election results ===
==== Maungakiekie subdivision ====
Name	Party	Votes
Simon Randall	Maungakiekie Team	5173
Bridget Graham	Maungakiekie Team	4847
Brett Clark	Maungakiekie Team	4711
Debbie Leaver	Focus Local	3209
Carl Power	Citizens & Ratepayers	2440
Roshni Golian	Citizens & Ratepayers	2060
Joseph Rebello	Citizens & Ratepayers	1425
Kane Te Waaka	Independent	904
Walter Wi-Peri		343
Informal		16
Blank		875

==== Tāmaki subdivision ====
Name	Party	Votes
Leila Boyle	Labour	8388
Alan Verral	Labour	7523
Josephine Bartley	Labour	7432
Chris Makoare	Labour	7367
Bob Wakefield	Citizens & Ratepayers	4447
Informal		7
Blank		1238

== List of board chairs ==
#	Name	Affiliation	Term
1	Leila Boyle	Labour	2010–2012
2	Simon Randall	Maungakiekie Team	2012–2016
3	Josephine Bartley	Labour	2016–2018
4	Chris Makoare	Labour	2018–2019
5	Maria Meredith	Labour	2019–2025
6	Debbie Burrows	Communities and Residents	2025–present
