= Maungakiekie-Tāmaki ward =

- Ward of Auckland
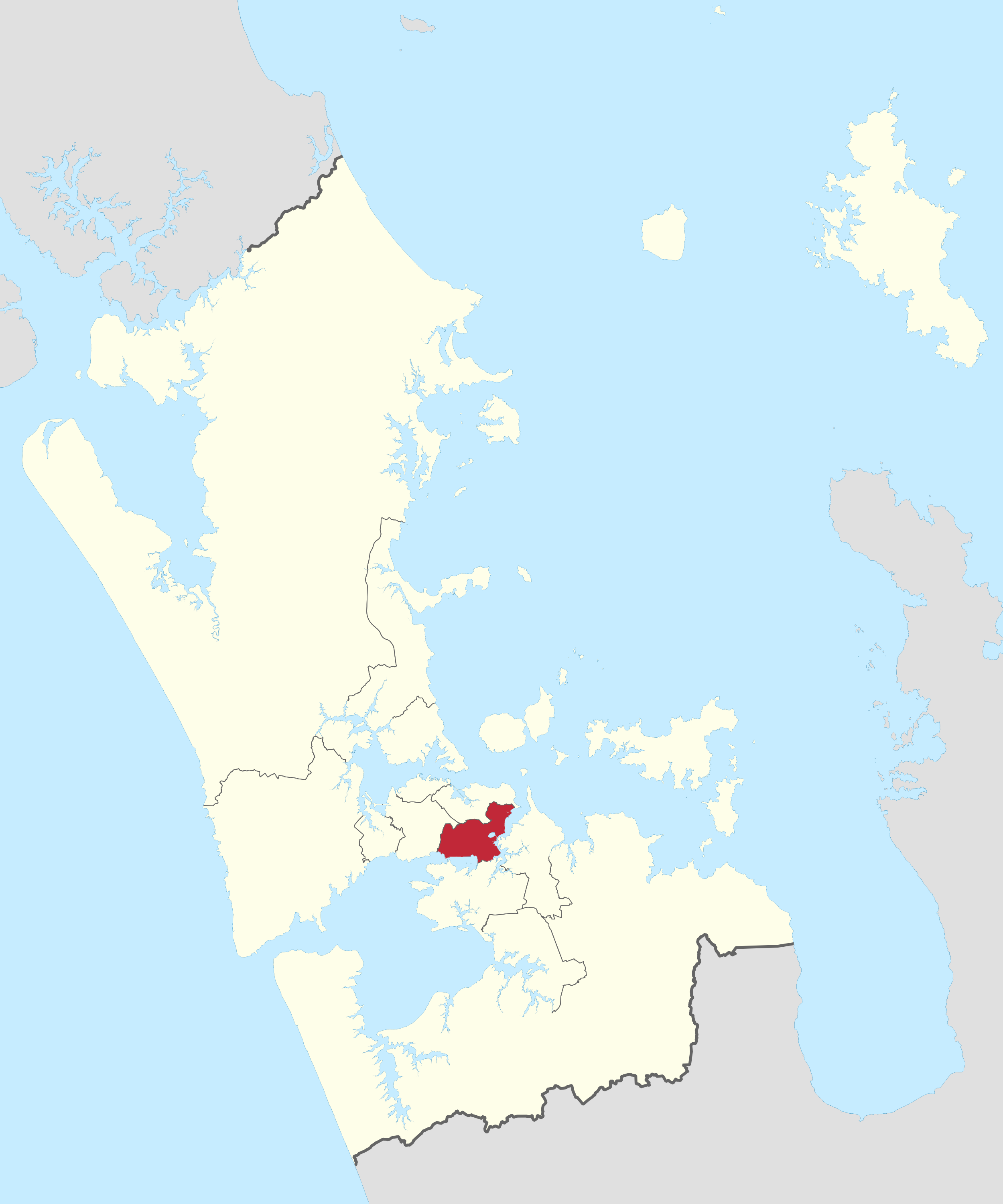
- Country: New Zealand
- Island: North Island
- Region: Auckland Region

Government
  - Councillor: Josephine Bartley

Area
  - Land: 40.39 km^{2} (15.59 sq mi)

Population (June 2025)
  - Total: 96,800
  - Density: 2,400/km^{2} (6,210/sq mi)

The Maungakiekie-Tāmaki ward is an Auckland Council ward which elects one councillor and covers the Maungakiekie-Tāmaki Local Board Area. The current councillor is Josephine Bartley. It is coterminous with the Maungakiekie-Tāmaki local government area governed by the board and Auckland Council.

== Geography ==
The area is the south-eastern part of the Auckland isthmus. It includes the suburbs of Glen Innes, Point England, Tāmaki, Panmure, Mount Wellington, Westfield, Penrose, Oranga, Onehunga, Southdown and One Tree Hill.

There are several geographic features, including:

- Maungakiekie / One Tree Hill
- Maungarei / Mount Wellington
- Mutukaroa / Hamlins Hill
- Panmure Basin

== Features ==
The local board includes the major retail areas of Panmure, Onehunga and Sylvia Park. Manufacturing, bulk storage and distribution are major employers. Mt Smart Stadium is also located within the area.

== Demographics ==
Maungakiekie-Tāmaki ward covers 40.39 km^{2} (15.59 sq mi) and had an estimated population of 96,800 as of June 2025, with a population density of 2,397 people per km^{2}.

Historical population
Year	Pop.	±% p.a.
2006	66,372	—
2013	80,346	+2.77%
2018	87,054	+1.62%
2023	88,545	+0.34%
The 2006 population is for a smaller area of 36.38 km^{2}. Source:

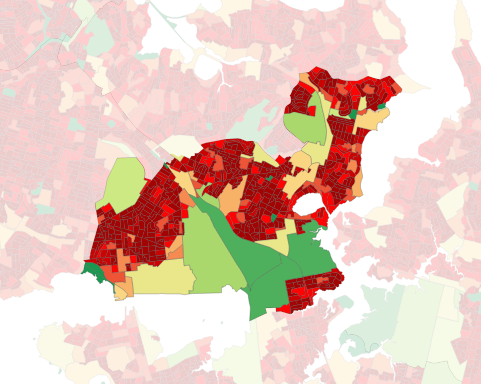
Population density in the 2023 census

Maungakiekie-Tāmaki had a population of 88,545 in the 2023 New Zealand census, an increase of 1,491 people (1.7%) since the 2018 census, and an increase of 8,199 people (10.2%) since the 2013 census. There were 43,521 males, 44,655 females and 366 people of other genders in 30,423 dwellings. 3.9% of people identified as LGBTIQ+. The median age was 34.6 years (compared with 38.1 years nationally). There were 16,698 people (18.9%) aged under 15 years, 19,230 (21.7%) aged 15 to 29, 41,898 (47.3%) aged 30 to 64, and 10,719 (12.1%) aged 65 or older.

People could identify as more than one ethnicity. The results were 44.2% European (Pākehā); 13.4% Māori; 23.6% Pasifika; 30.3% Asian; 3.2% Middle Eastern, Latin American and African New Zealanders (MELAA); and 1.5% other, which includes people giving their ethnicity as "New Zealander". English was spoken by 91.8%, Māori language by 2.8%, Samoan by 4.4%, and other languages by 30.3%. No language could be spoken by 2.8% (e.g. too young to talk). New Zealand Sign Language was known by 0.4%. The percentage of people born overseas was 42.5, compared with 28.8% nationally.

Religious affiliations were 40.6% Christian, 4.4% Hindu, 2.6% Islam, 1.1% Māori religious beliefs, 2.6% Buddhist, 0.3% New Age, 0.2% Jewish, and 1.8% other religions. People who answered that they had no religion were 40.6%, and 6.0% of people did not answer the census question.

Of those at least 15 years old, 24,282 (33.8%) people had a bachelor's or higher degree, 28,557 (39.7%) had a post-high school certificate or diploma, and 19,014 (26.5%) people exclusively held high school qualifications. The median income was $46,600, compared with $41,500 nationally. 10,194 people (14.2%) earned over $100,000 compared to 12.1% nationally. The employment status of those at least 15 was that 40,383 (56.2%) people were employed full-time, 7,380 (10.3%) were part-time, and 2,400 (3.3%) were unemployed.

== Councillors ==
Maungakiekie-Tāmaki Ward councillor of Auckland
- Incumbent; Josephine Bartley since 2018
- Term length: Three years
- Inaugural holder: Richard Northey
- Formation: 1 November 2010
- Website: www.aucklandcouncil.govt.nz

Election	Councillors elected	Affiliation	Votes	Notes
2010	Richard Northey	Labour	9236	
2013	Denise Krum	Communities and Residents	8483	
2016	Denise Lee	Auckland Future	9361	elected as Denise Krum. Reverted to her maiden name, Lee, after the election. Resigned after election to parliament at the 2017 general election, triggering a by-election.
2018 by-election	Josephine Bartley	Labour	7225	elected in by-election, 17 February 2018.
2019	Josephine Bartley	Labour	8358	
2022	Josephine Bartley	Labour	8877	
2025	Josephine Bartley	Labour		

== Election results ==
Election results for the Maungakiekie-Tāmaki ward:

=== 2025 election results ===
Maungakiekie-Tāmaki ward
Affiliation	Candidate	Votes	%
Labour	Josephine Bartley^{†}	7,818	52.94
Communities and Residents	Tabetha Elliott	3,567	24.15
Independent	John Alcock	1,590	10.77
Independent	Patrick O'Meara	850	5.76
Independent	FaAfuhia Michael Fia	593	4.02
Informal		25	0.17
Blank		326	2.21
Turnout		14,769	26.23
Registered		56,301	
Labour hold			
^{†} incumbent

=== 2022 election results ===
	Name	Affiliation	Votes
1	Josephine Bartley	Labour	8877
	Troy Elliott	Communities and Residents	6868
	John Peebles	Independent	1812
	Christopher Carroll		1213
Blank			954
Informal			29

=== 2016 election results ===
	Name	Affiliation	Votes	%
1	Denise Krum	Auckland Future	9,361	53.9%
	Patrick Cummuskey	Labour	4,920	28.3%
	Viliami Teli Tiseli		1,748	10.1%
Blank			1,320	7.6%
Informal			25	0.1%
Turnout			17,374	
