= Josephine Bartley =

New Zealand politician

Councillor Josephine Bartley
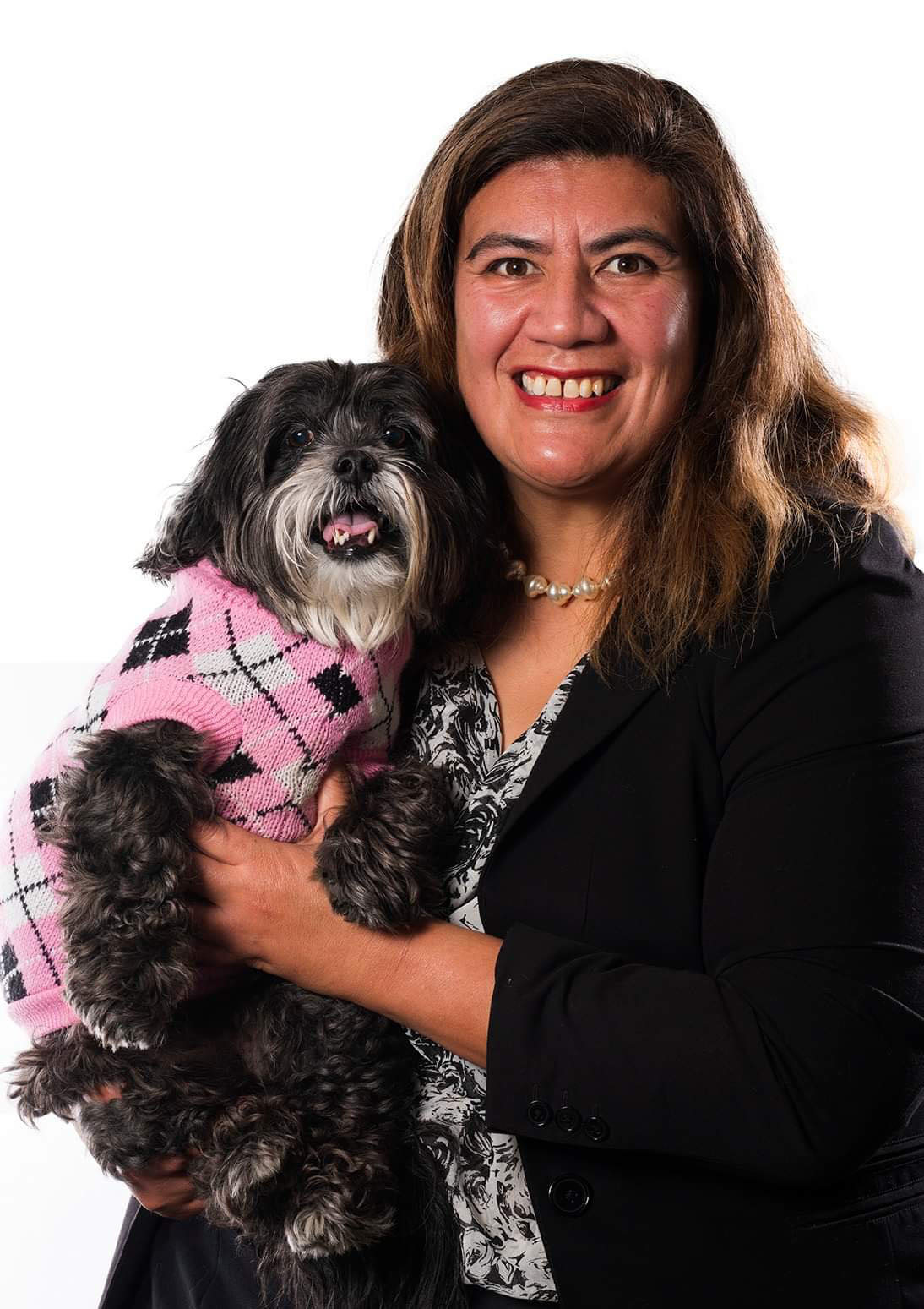
- Bartley and her dog Milo in 2022

Member of the Auckland Council
- Incumbent
- Assumed office 21 February 2018
- Preceded by: Denise Lee
- Constituency: Maungakiekie-Tāmaki ward

Personal details
- Party: Labour

Josephine Ruth Bartley is a New Zealand politician who has been on the Auckland Council as a member of the Labour Party since 2018, and is the first Pacific Islander elected to the council. Prior to her tenure on the council she was a member of the Maungakiekie-Tāmaki Local Board.

== Early life ==
Josephine Ruth Bartley was born to Eddie Bartley and raised in Māngere. She is of Samoan descent, with her father being from the villages of Tapatapao and Singamoga in Samoa. Her great-grandfather was from Guangzhou and moved to Samoa to work as a tailor. Her family financially struggled due to her mother's gambling addiction.

== Career ==
In the 2006 election Bartley unsuccessfully ran for a seat on a community board. Bartley was the Labour candidate for a seat in the New Zealand Parliament from Tāmaki in the 2008 election, but lost to Allan Peachey. Bartley won a seat on the Maungakiekie-Tāmaki Local Board from the Tāmaki subdivision in 2010. She was reelected in 2013 and 2016. She had the highest number of votes out of any candidate in 2013 and 2016. She became chair of the board in 2016.

Denise Lee left the Auckland Council after being elected to the New Zealand Parliament. Bartley defeated Auckland Future nominee Josh Beddell in the 2018 by-election. She was the first Pacific Islander woman elected to the council.

Bartley received a substantial number of threats of violence because of her involvement in the COVID-19 vaccine rollout.

Bartley ran for and won re-election as a councillor for the Maungakiekie-Tāmaki ward in the 2025 elections.

== Personal life ==
Bartley obtained her first house in 2025, due to the shared ownership scheme by the Tamaki Regeneration Company.

== Works cited ==
=== News ===
- "Auckland Councillor Josephine Bartley tells John Cowan about her journey to the city council". Newstalk ZB. 13 April 2025. Archived from the original on 30 June 2025.
- "First Pacific woman has been elected to Auckland's Council". Radio New Zealand. 20 February 2018. Archived from the original on 30 June 2025.
- "New Auckland Council representatives elected". The New Zealand Herald. 19 February 2018. Archived from the original on 30 June 2025.
- Burrows, Matt (1 November 2021). "Community rallies around Auckland councillor Josephine Bartley after abuse by COVID-19 anti-vaxxers". Newshub. Archived from the original on 1 November 2021.
- Burrows, Matt (14 April 2025). "Real Life: Auckland Council's Josephine Bartley on politics, faith and facing down abuse". The New Zealand Herald. Archived from the original on 30 June 2025.
- Edmunds, Susan (18 February 2025). "Auckland councillor among those helped into homeownership". Radio New Zealand. Archived from the original on 30 June 2025.
- Mayron, Sapeer (11 January 2025). "How councillor Josephine Bartley got into her first ever home". The Post. Archived from the original on 30 June 2025.
- Owen, Catrin (30 October 2021). "Covid-19: Auckland councillor worried after three 'intimidating men' threaten to vandalise car". Stuff. Archived from the original on 30 June 2025.
- Pasley, James (21 December 2017). "Auckland Councillor and Waitematā Local Board candidates confirmed". Stuff. Archived from the original on 30 June 2025.

=== Web ===
- "Official Count Results -- Tāmaki". Electoral Commission. Archived from the original on 3 February 2025.
- "2013 Auckland Election Results" (PDF). Auckland Council. Archived from the original (PDF) on 26 October 2013.
- "Local board members" (PDF). Auckland Council. Archived from the original (PDF) on 3 February 2018.
