= Howick ward =

- Ward of Auckland
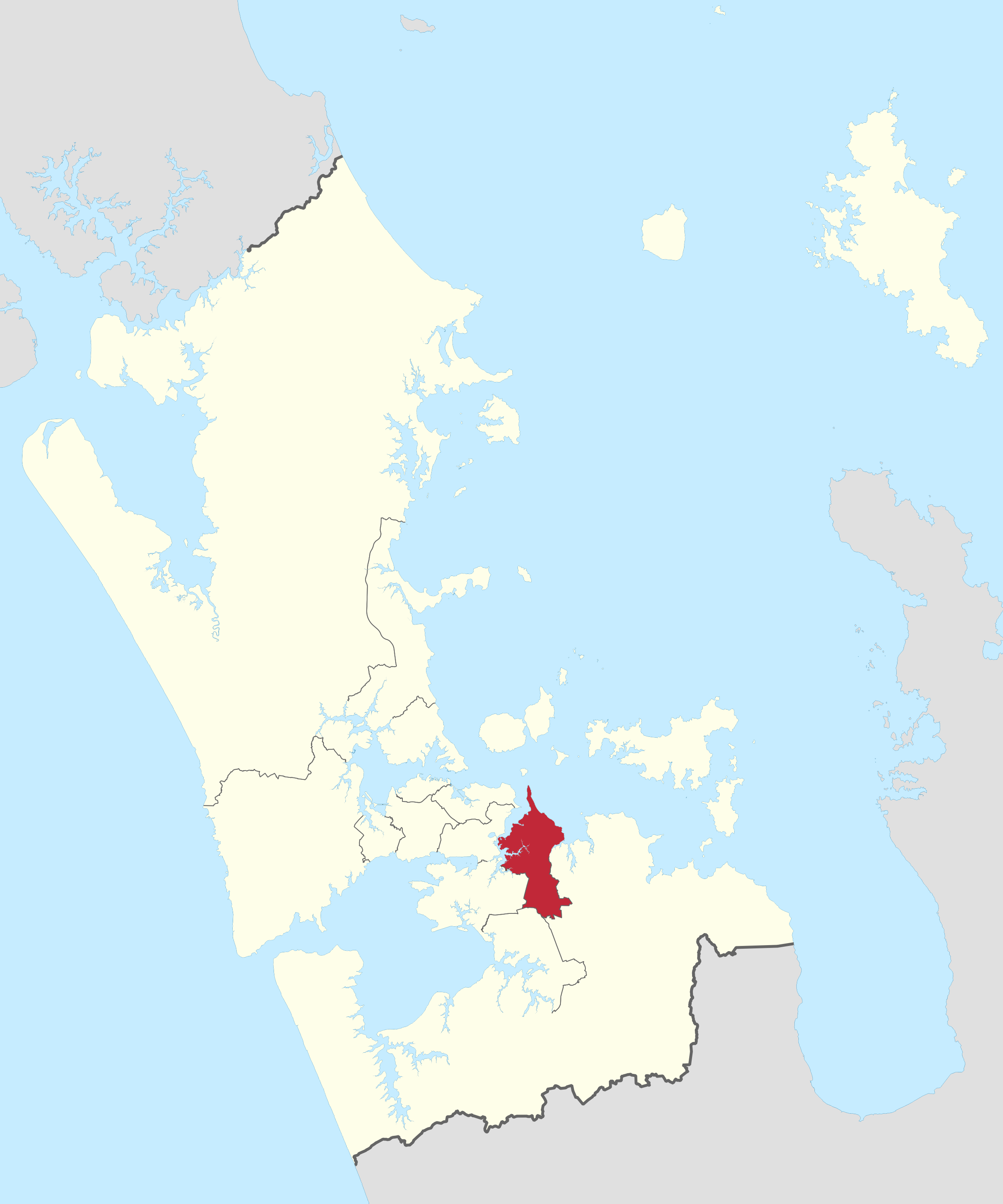
- Country: New Zealand
- Island: North Island
- Region: Auckland Region

Area
  - Land: 69.70 km^{2} (26.91 sq mi)

Population (June 2025)
  - Total: 173,200
  - Density: 2,485/km^{2} (6,436/sq mi)

The Howick ward is an Auckland Council ward which elects two councillors and covers the same area as the Howick Local Board. Bo Burns and Maurice Williamson are the current councillors.

== Demographics ==
Howick ward covers 69.70 km^{2} (26.91 sq mi) and had an estimated population of 173,200 as of June 2025, with a population density of 2,485 people per km^{2}.

Historical population
Year	Pop.	±% p.a.
2006	113,505	—
2013	127,125	+1.63%
2018	140,970	+2.09%
2023	153,570	+1.73%

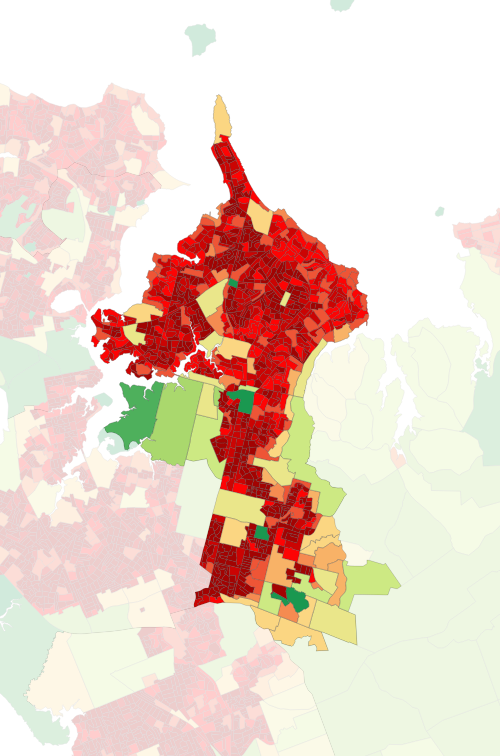
Population density in the 2023 census

Howick ward had a population of 153,570 in the 2023 New Zealand census, an increase of 12,600 people (8.9%) since the 2018 census, and an increase of 26,445 people (20.8%) since the 2013 census. There were 75,996 males, 77,190 females and 381 people of other genders in 47,061 dwellings. 2.5% of people identified as LGBTIQ+. The median age was 38.1 years (compared with 38.1 years nationally). There were 29,202 people (19.0%) aged under 15 years, 29,346 (19.1%) aged 15 to 29, 73,104 (47.6%) aged 30 to 64, and 21,915 (14.3%) aged 65 or older.

People could identify as more than one ethnicity. The results were 38.1% European (Pākehā); 6.3% Māori; 8.0% Pasifika; 52.5% Asian; 2.8% Middle Eastern, Latin American and African New Zealanders (MELAA); and 2.7% other, which includes people giving their ethnicity as "New Zealander". English was spoken by 88.6%, Māori language by 1.1%, Samoan by 2.1%, and other languages by 43.3%. No language could be spoken by 2.1% (e.g. too young to talk). New Zealand Sign Language was known by 0.3%. The percentage of people born overseas was 55.5, compared with 28.8% nationally.

Religious affiliations were 32.4% Christian, 7.2% Hindu, 3.5% Islam, 0.3% Māori religious beliefs, 3.6% Buddhist, 0.2% New Age, 0.1% Jewish, and 4.3% other religions. People who answered that they had no religion were 42.6%, and 5.9% of people did not answer the census question.

Of those at least 15 years old, 39,618 (31.9%) people had a bachelor's or higher degree, 49,611 (39.9%) had a post-high school certificate or diploma, and 35,130 (28.2%) people exclusively held high school qualifications. The median income was $44,900, compared with $41,500 nationally. 17,046 people (13.7%) earned over $100,000 compared to 12.1% nationally. The employment status of those at least 15 was that 66,246 (53.3%) people were employed full-time, 14,814 (11.9%) were part-time, and 3,156 (2.5%) were unemployed.

== Councillors ==
Howick Ward councillors of Auckland
- Incumbent; Bo Burns; Maurice Williamson
- Term length: Three years
- Inaugural holder: Sharon Stewart; Jami-Lee Ross
- Formation: 1 November 2010
- Website: Howick ward on the Auckland Council website

Election		Councillors elected	Affiliation	Votes	Notes
2010	1	Sharon Stewart	Independent	23716	
2010	2	Jami-Lee Ross	Citizens & Ratepayers	19289	Resigned on 7 March 2011 after winning election to parliament.
2011 by-election		Dick Quax	Citizens & Ratepayers	11600^{(a)}	Elected in May 2011 by-election.
2013	1	Sharon Stewart	Independent	–	Unopposed
2013	2	Dick Quax	Independent	–	Unopposed
2016	1	Sharon Stewart	Independent	17923	
2016	2	Dick Quax	Independent	15516	Died in office in May 2018.
2018 by-election		Paul Young	Independent	7624^{(a)}	Elected in September 2018 by-election.
2019	1	Sharon Stewart	Independent	19531	
2019	2	Paul Young	Independent	16809	
2022	1	Sharon Stewart	Independent	16013	
2022	2	Maurice Williamson	Independent	14544	
2025	1	Bo Burns	Independent		
2025	2	Maurice Williamson	Independent		

^{(a)}By-election result.

== Election results ==
Election results for the Howick Ward:

=== 2025 election results ===
Howick ward
Party	Candidate	Votes	%	±%
Independent	Bo Burns	12,038	37.07	+6.70
Independent	Maurice Williamson^{†}	11,535	35.52	−2.92
Independent	Paul Young	9,615	29.61	−1.78
Independent	Damian Light	7,873	24.24	−1.73
Independent	Barry Jensen	5,461	16.82	(new)
Independent	Stephen Hill	4,736	14.58	(new)
ACT Local	Ali Dahche	3,902	12.02	(new)
Independent	Leanne Seniloli	2,947	9.07	(new)
Informal votes		108	0.33	0.00
Blank votes		642	1.98	−1.20
Turnout		32,474	28.84	−6.89
Registered electors		112,594		
Independent gain from Independent				
Independent hold				
^{†} incumbent

=== 2022 election results ===
	Name	Affiliation	Votes
1	Sharon Stewart	Independent	16013
2	Maurice Williamson	Independent	14544
	Paul Young	#Burns&Young	11876
	Bo Burns	#Burns&Young	11491
	Damian Light	Independent	9825
	Morgan Xiao		3840
Blank			1202
Informal			123

=== 2016 election results ===
	Name	Affiliation	Votes	%
1	Sharon Stewart	Independent	17,923	25.4%
2	Dick Quax	Independent	15,516	22.0%
	Paul Young	Independent	7,046	10.0%
	David Hay	Independent	5,757	8.2%
	Julie Zhu	Green Party	5,732	8.1%
	Matthew Cross		5,034	7.1%
	Olivia Montgomery		4,409	6.3%
	Gyanandra Kumar	Labour Party	3,129	4.4%
	Tofik Mamedov	Labour Party	2,743	3.9%
	Ian Colin Ireland		1,120	1.6%
Blank			1,878	2.7%
Informal			164	0.2%
Turnout			70,451	
