= Paul Young (New Zealand politician) =

New Zealand politician

Paul Young is a New Zealand politician who was an Auckland Councillor and a board member of the Counties Manukau District Health Board.

== Early life and education ==
Then aged 25, Young immigrated from Taiwan in 1989. The councillor operates his own business "Paul Young International", which operates events around New Zealand and Australia. He studied marketing at the University of Auckland and is married with two children.

== Political career ==
Auckland Council
| Years | Ward | Affiliation |
|---|---|---|
| 2018–2019 | Howick | Independent |
| 2019–2022 | Howick | Independent |

Young contested the 2011 Botany by-election under the New Citizen Party and came third. He later contested the Botany seat in the 2011 general election and 2014 general election, while affiliated to the Conservative Party. Young was unsuccessful in his attempts. He then ran again unsuccessfully to be Howick ward councillor in the 2016 Auckland local elections.

He was elected to Auckland Council in a 2018 by-election, replacing the late Dick Quax in the Howick ward. Young was Auckland's first Chinese councillor.

The politician was then re-elected to the council in the 2019 Auckland local elections. In 2019, Young's promotional material was subject to graffiti, which accused him of being associated with the Chinese Communist Party, with the attacks being described as "racist" in nature. During the campaign, he had been a keen advocate of "trackless trams".

In his tenure, Young opposed the regional fuel tax and the sale of council-owned parks in his ward. Meanwhile, he advocated to speed up delivery of the Eastern Busway project, voted to support climate change action through improving public transport, and supported cycleway construction in the city. He has also advocated to increase the speed of Covid-19 vaccination uptake in Asian communities.

He was unsuccessful in re-election in the 2022 Auckland local elections. Young again stood unsuccessfully to be a councillor for the Howick ward in the 2025 elections.
