= Howick Local Board =

Coordinates: 36.91379457°S 174.87111479°E

Howick Local Board Te Poari ā-Rohe o Howick
- Local board of Howick
- Country: New Zealand
- Region: Auckland
- Territorial authority: Auckland Council
- Ward: Howick Ward
- Legislated: 2010

Area
  - Land: 69.70 km^{2} (26.91 sq mi)

Population (June 2025)
  - Total: 173,200
  - Density: 2,485/km^{2} (6,436/sq mi)

Local Board Members

Leadership
- Chairperson: Bruce Kendall, C&R
- Deputy chairperson: Kai Zeng, Healthy and Happy

Structure
- Seats: 11
- Political groups: Communities and Residents (3); #weknowhowick (2); Healthy and Happy (2); Practical not political (1); Flat Bush First (1); Independent (2)
- Length of term: 3 years

Elections
- Last election: 2025
- Next election: 2028

Meeting place
- Howick Local Board Meeting Room, Pakuranga Library Complex, 7 Aylesbury Street, Pakuranga

Howick Local Board is one of the 21 local boards of the Auckland Council, and is overseen by the council's Howick Ward councillors.

The board's administrative area includes the suburbs Pakuranga, Howick, Flat Bush, and East Tāmaki, and covers much of East Auckland.

The board was initially governed by nine board members, with three elected from each of the boards three sub-divisions: Pakuranga, Howick and Botany. The inaugural members were elected in the nationwide 2010 local elections, coinciding with the introduction of the Auckland Council.

In 2025, the number of board members increased to eleven with the introduction of a new subdivision for Flat Bush.

== Geography ==
The area includes the large communities of Pakuranga and Howick, the newer suburbs of Botany and Flat Bush, and the area of East Tāmaki.

== Demographics ==
Howick Local Board Area covers 69.70 km^{2} (26.91 sq mi) and had an estimated population of 173,200 as of June 2025, with a population density of 2,485 people per km^{2}.

== 2025-2028 term ==
Due to its growing population, a new subdivision for Flat Bush, electing three additional board members, was introduced at the 2025 local elections. In turn, the number of members elected from the Botany subdivision was reduced from three to two.

The current board members for the 2025-2028 term, elected at the 2025 local elections, are:

Name	Affiliation	Subdivision	Position
Bruce Kendall	Communities and Residents	Pakuranga	Chairperson
Kai Zeng	Healthy and Happy	Flat Bush	Deputy Chairperson
Damian Light	Independent	Botany	Board member
Mike Turinsky	Practical not Political	Botany	Board member
Krish Naidu	Flat Bush First	Flat Bush	Board member
Peter Young	Healthy and Happy	Flat Bush	Board member
Luke Collings (Note: Elected as ranking candidate Bo Burns was elected as councillor)	Communities and Residents	Howick	Board member
John Spiller	#weknowhowick	Howick	Board member
Adele White	#weknowhowick	Howick	Board member
Katrina Bungard		Pakuranga	Board member
Jack Collins	Communities and Residents	Pakuranga	Board member

== 2022–2025 term ==
The board members, elected at the 2022 local body elections in October 2022 were:

Members	Affiliation	Subdivision	Position
Damian Light	Independent	Botany	Chairperson
Bo Burns	#weknowhowick	Howick	Deputy Chairperson
Mike Turinsky	Practical Not Political	Botany	Board member
Peter Young	#weknowbotany	Botany	Board member
John Spiller	#weknowhowick	Howick	Board member
Adele White	#weknowhowick	Howick	Board member
Katrina Bungard	Communities and Residents	Pakuranga	Board member
Bruce Kendall	Practical Not Political	Pakuranga	Board member
David Collings	Communities and Residents	Pakuranga	Board member

== 2019–2022 term ==
The board members, elected at the 2019 local body elections in October 2019 for the 2019–2022 term were:

Members	Affiliation	Subdivision	Position
Adele White	#weknowhowick	Howick	Chairperson
John Spiller	#weknowhowick	Howick	Deputy Chairperson
Mike Turinsky	Practical Not Political	Botany	Board member
Peter Young	Communities and Residents	Botany	Board member
Bob Wichman	Communities and Residents	Botany	Board member
Bo Burns (Note: Elected as ranking candidate Sharon Stewart was elected as councillor)	#weknowhowick	Howick	Board member
Katrina Bungard	Communities and Residents	Pakuranga	Board member
Bruce Kendall	Independent	Pakuranga	Board member
David Collings	Communities and Residents	Pakuranga	Board member

== 2016–2019 term ==
The 2016–2019 term ran from the 2016 local body elections to the local body elections in 2019. The board members were:

Members	Affiliation	Subdivision	Position
David Collings	Vision and Voice	Pakuranga	Chairperson
Katrina Bungard	Vision and Voice	Pakuranga	Deputy Chairperson
Mike Turinsky (Note: Elected via 2017 byelection following resignation of Lucy Schwaner)	Practical Not Political	Botany	Board member
Peter Young	Vision and Voice	Botany	Board member
Bob Wichman	Vision and Voice	Botany	Board member
Jim Donald (Note: Elected as ranking candidate Sharon Stewart was elected as councillor)	Ratepayers and Residents	Howick	Board member
John Spiller	Vision and Voice	Howick	Board member
Adele White	Vision and Voice	Howick	Board member
Garry Boles	Vision and Voice	Pakuranga	Board member

Lucy Schwaner, Vision and Voice - Botany, was elected at the 2016 election but resigned during the first board meeting following the re-election of David Collings as chairperson.

== See also ==
- Howick Youth Council
- East Auckland
- Howick
- Pakuranga
- Flat Bush
