= Dick Quax =

New Zealand athlete (1948–2018)

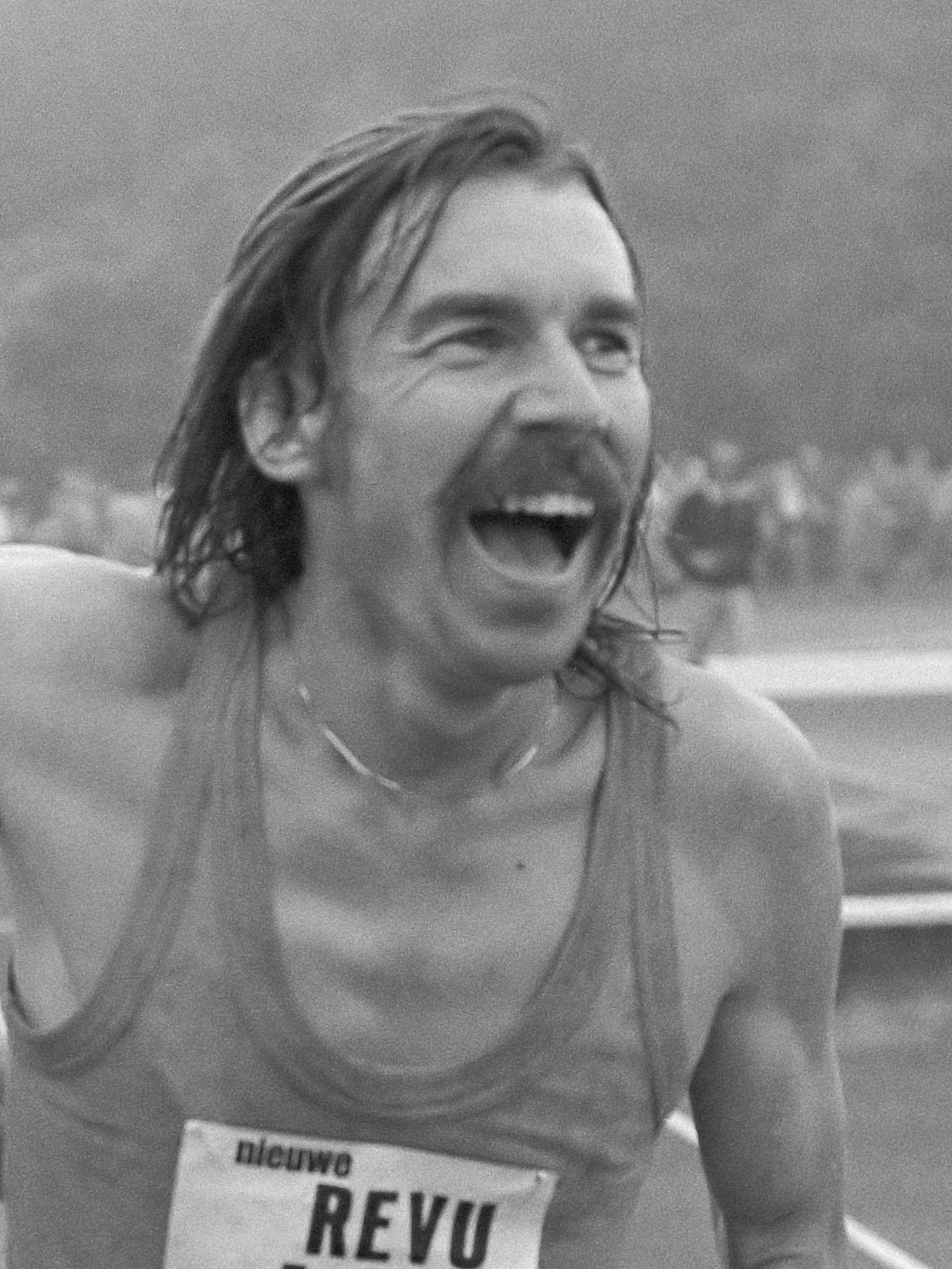
- Quax in 1977

Personal information
- Full name: Theodorus Jacobus Leonardus Quax
- Citizenship: New Zealand
- Born: 1 January 1948 Alkmaar, Netherlands
- Died: 28 May 2018 (aged 70) Auckland, New Zealand

Sport
- Coached by: John Davies

Achievements and titles
- National finals: 1 mile champion (1969); 5000 m champion (1972, 1973, 1974)
- Personal bests: 5,000 m – 13:12.87; 10,000 m – 27:41.95; Marathon – 2:10:47
Medal record
Men's athletics
Representing New Zealand
Olympic Games
Silver medal – second place	1976 Montreal	5000 metres
Commonwealth Games
Silver medal – second place	1970 Edinburgh	1500 metres

Theodorus Jacobus Leonardus Quax (1 January 1948 – 28 May 2018), known as Dick Quax, was a Dutch-born New Zealand runner, one-time world record holder in the 5000 metres, and local-body politician.

Quax stood for Parliament for the ACT Party in 1999 and 2002. He was a Manukau City councillor from 2001 to 2007, when he stood unsuccessfully for mayor, and was a councillor on the Auckland Council from 2011 until his death in 2018.

== Athletic career ==
Quax won four New Zealand national athletics titles: the 5000 m in 1972, 1973, and 1974; and the one mile in 1969.

At the 1970 British Commonwealth Games, Quax won the silver medal in the 1500 metres. In the 5000 m, at the 1972 Summer Olympics he was eliminated in the heats, but he won silver in a closely fought and dramatic race in 1976. He did not compete in 1980 in Moscow due to the West's boycott.

In 1977 at Stockholm Quax set a world record of 13:12.9 in the 5000 m. This record stood for less than a year, but as a national record it stood for over 31 years, until beaten by Adrian Blincoe in July 2008.

Early in 1980 at Stanford Stadium Quax missed Jos Hermens' 15 km world record by five seconds, running a New Zealand national record of 43:01.7. In his later career Quax switched his focus to the marathon, running 2:11.13 in his debut for 4th place at the Nike OTC Marathon in 1979, at that time the fastest debut marathon in history. In 1980 he returned and won the race in a New Zealand record time of 2:10.47. After retiring from competition, Quax established a career in sports management. He also coached his son, Theo, the New Zealand U18 and U20 Champion for 1500 m.

=== Personal bests ===
Distance	Time	Place	Date
5000 m	13:12.87	Stockholm	1977
10000 m	27:41.95	London	1977

== Political career ==
Quax was a member of the ACT Party and stood in the 1999 election in the Pakuranga electorate but was unsuccessful. He was ranked 11th on the ACT party list, which was too low to be elected from the list, as only the first 9 candidates got returned. He stood again in the 2002 general election.

In October 2001 Quax was elected to the Manukau City Council for the Pakuranga ward and was re-elected in 2004 to represent the new Botany-Clevedon ward after a failed bid for the Manukau City mayoralty. On 13 October 2007 Quax lost his bid to become mayor of Manukau City to Len Brown by 14,000 votes.

During this election, Quax complained to the electoral office over an "offensive flyer" depicting him and members of his People's Choice party as the Thunderbirds. His complaint was not upheld as there was no evidence to suggest who had posted the flyers.

Auckland Council
Years	Ward	Affiliation
2011–13	Howick	Citizens & Ratepayers
2013–16	Howick	Independent
2016–18	Howick	Independent

Quax stood for Citizens & Ratepayers in the 2010 Auckland Council elections, losing to Jami-Lee Ross by 253 votes. In 2011 Quax was elected to the council after a by-election was held in Howick due to Ross resigning after becoming a Member of Parliament. He was re-elected unopposed in 2013.

During the 2013 Len Brown mayoral scandal, Quax took the opportunity for political payback against Brown, leading the call for him to resign for not declaring hotel upgrades as gifts. It emerged that Quax had also not filed returns on the gifts he had received during the previous term.

Quax was re-elected in the 2016 Auckland elections.

In his tenure as councilor, he opposed high density housing and public transportation, and supported selling Auckland's council-owned water and wastewater supplier Watercare Services. While originally opposing the council's proposed Unitary Plan, Quax later supported the plan in full. Quax was described by The New Zealand Herald as "right wing".

=== "Quaxing" ===
Quax tweeted in January 2015 about his disbelief that anyone in the Western world would go shopping by means of "walking, cycling, or public transit." Twitter users responded by creating the hashtag "#quaxing". The Public Address website voted "quaxing" as its word of the year 2015, followed by "Red Peak" and "twitterati".

Quax, [verb; past: quaxed, present: quaxing] — to shop, in the western world, by means of walking, cycling or public transit. #quaxing

— Non-motorist (@ByTheMotorway), 26 April 2015

== Personal life ==
Quax and his family arrived in New Zealand from the Netherlands on 10 October 1954. According to an interview in the New Zealand Listener the family had travelled on the same ship as future Race Relations Commissioner Joris de Bres. Quax became a naturalised New Zealander in 1969.

Quax married three times, his third marriage being to Roxanne in August 1991. He had three children including son Theo, who was selected to represent New Zealand over 5 km at the 2026 World Athletics Road Running Championships in Denmark.

== Illness and death ==
It was revealed on 27 November 2013 that Quax had been undergoing treatment for throat cancer, which had been diagnosed two months earlier.

Quax died of cancer in Auckland on 28 May 2018, aged 70.

Records
Preceded by (Belgium) Emiel Puttemans	Men's 5000m World record holder 5 July 1977 – 8 April 1978	Succeeded by (Kenya) Henry Rono
Sporting positions
Preceded by (Belgium) Emiel Puttemans	Men's 5000m best year performance 1976–1977	Succeeded by (Kenya) Henry Rono
Awards
Preceded by John Walker	Lonsdale Cup of the New Zealand Olympic Committee; 1976	Succeeded by Rebecca Perrott
