= Join Australia Movement Party =

Former New Zealand political party

- Abbreviation: JAMP
- Leader: Rob Caithness
- Secretary: Craig Bushell
- Founded: 2011
- Ideology: New Zealand integration into Australia
- Colours: Green and Orange

Website
- joinaustraliamovement.co.nz (Defunct)

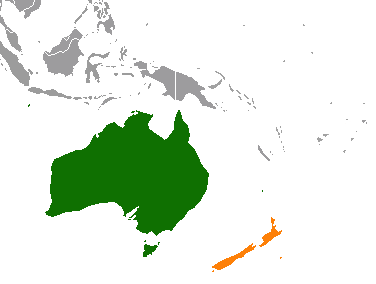
Australia and New Zealand

The Join Australia Movement Party was a political party in New Zealand. The party advocated political unity between New Zealand and Australia, and was led by Robin Caithness.

Caithness ran as a candidate for the party in the 2011 Botany by-election, receiving 45 votes. The party did not run any candidates in the 2011 general election.

== See also ==
- Australia–New Zealand relations
- Proposals for new Australian states
