= Auckland Future =

- Founded: 2016
- Ideology: Conservatism; Localism
- Political position: Centre-right
- Colors: Blue
- Slogan: Make it happen
- Auckland Council: 0 / 20
- Auckland Local Board Members: 0 / 149

Auckland Future is a centre-right political ticket that ran for local seats under the Auckland Council in 2016. It campaigned on a fiscally conservative platform. It did not stand candidates in the 2019 election.

== Policies ==
Auckland Future has a four-point policy for a fiscally conservative Auckland. It consists of the following pledges;

1. Keeping rates low
2. Cutting waste
3. Reducing staff costs
4. Getting debt under control

The ticket was formed in order to combat dissatisfaction with the status quo in the Auckland Council while under Mayor Len Brown, who served two terms 2010–16. Auckland Future's aims were to ensure that rates are kept low and that the council could be held accountable by those who elected them for any pledges it committed to.

Many National Party members supported the ticket, and given that National does not run candidates in local body elections, the support from its members was an indication of the party's support for Auckland Future. Like the National Party, Auckland Future intends to be a fiscally conservative ticket and much of the policy is ideologically aligned with the National Party.

Auckland Future ran a region-wide campaign in the lead up to the 2016 Auckland local elections, but secured few seats. In March 2019, it announced that it would not field candidates at the 2019 election.

=== Former Representatives ===
==== Local Boards ====
- Danielle Grant – Kaipātiki Local Board - stood in 2019 under Shore Action
- Bernie Diver – Maungakiekie Subdivision: Maungakiekie-Tamaki Local Board
- Debbie Leaver – Maungakiekie Subdivision: Maungakiekie-Tamaki Local Board
- Lisa Whyte – Upper Harbour Local Board (chair) - stood in 2019 as an independent

==== Councillors ====
- Denise Lee – Maungakiekie-Tamaki ward – resigned after being elected MP for Maungakiekie at the 2017 general election

==== Local boards ====
- Mark Davey – Waitematā Local Board

== Election results ==
Election	Candidates nominated		Seats won	
Election	Local Board Candidates	Council Candidates	Local Board Seats	Council Seats
2016	29/149	9/20	4 / 149	1 / 20

== Structure ==
Auckland Future is governed by a 10-member board, which in 2017 was made up of: Peter Tong (chair), Leilua Pulotu Lui Alofa, Joseph Bergin, Jo Bransgrove, Alan Dormer, Murray Higgs, Beth O'Loughlin, Darren Ward, Jenny Wang QSM, and Sue Wood.
