= New Citizen Party =

- Founded: December 2, 2010
- Dissolved: February 29, 2012

The New Citizen Party was a political party in New Zealand that aimed to represent Chinese New Zealanders and had a focus on economic and law-and-order issues. Auckland businessman Paul Young, former New Zealand Labour Party list-candidate Stephen Ching, and Chinese businessman Jack Chen were organisers for the party.

== Party history ==
On 2 December 2010 the Electoral Commission registered the party, making it eligible to contest the party vote in general elections.

Paul Young came third in the 2011 Botany by-election, based on provisional figures.

On 18 October 2011 the party announced that it would withdraw from the 2011 election, and that Young would instead stand for the Conservative Party of New Zealand. At about the same time, authorities in Hong Kong laid charges against Jack Chen and issued a warrant for his arrest.

On 29 February 2012 the Electoral Commission cancelled the party's registration at its own request. As of March 2012 the Party website no longer operated.
