= Sharon Stewart (politician) =

New Zealand politician

Councillor Sharon Stewart

Howick Ward councillor
- In office 31 October 2010 – 11 October 2025 Serving with Maurice Williamson
- Preceded by: Position created
- Succeeded by: Bo Burns

Sharon Stewart is a New Zealand politician who was an Auckland Councillor for the Howick ward.

She was also the chair of Auckland Council's Civil Defence and Emergency Management Committee. Stewart assumed the role in 2013.

== Political career ==
Auckland Council
Years	Ward	Affiliation
2010–2013	Howick	Independent
2013–2016	Howick	Independent
2016–2019	Howick	Independent
2019–2022	Howick	Independent
2022–2025	Howick	Independent

She was awarded the Queen's Service Medal (QSM) in 1998 for services to Howick. Stewart served on the Manukau City Council for twelve years, between 1998 and 2010. The councillor was instrumental in helping aid New Zealand rescue efforts in the 1999 Jiji earthquake. On the Manukau council, she was an advocate against 3G cell tower construction, in her local area, on the basis of decreased property values and "health risk[s]".

In the 2010 Auckland Council elections, Stewart won a seat on the Auckland Council, topping the poll in the Howick ward.

Prior to being elected an Auckland councillor, she opposed the naming of her ward seat, which originally had been named 'Te Irirangi' after the area's principal Māori chief prior to European colonisation. Stewart organised a petition to instead name the ward 'Howick', which was successful. She was reelected unopposed in 2013. She was again re-elected in the 2016 Auckland elections. She was again re-elected in the 2019 Auckland elections.

Between 2010 and 2019, Stewart opposed denser housing in discussion around the Auckland Unitary Plan, as well as rate rises. During debate over the Unitary Plan, she attracted controversy by suggesting that potential requirements to consult with Māori were "undemocratic" and a "form of economic and social apartheid". The councillor stood on the self-dubbed "B Team" in opposition to the leadership of Auckland Mayor Phil Goff.

In the run-up to the 2019 Auckland elections, the New Zealand Herald opined that the councillor made little contribution to council discussions and that Stewart would be better suited as a member of the Howick Local Board. In that year, she supported the prioritisation of the Reeves Road Flyover roading project instead of the Eastern Busway public transport project. In March 2022, Stewart was the only councillor to vote against the council's Regional Streets for People programme which would give money to walking and cycling infrastructure projects. Stewart has advocated for higher-quality pavement due to personal experiences – known as her "war with footpaths". In June 2022, she said high-density, affordable housing should be built in rural areas like Glenbrook, instead of within existing central isthmus suburbs amid a debate over special character area housing provisions. Stewart said: "We should be building where the blue-collar want to work – if they want to work."

Stewart announced she would not seek another term and retire from local government in October 2025.
