= May 2020 New Zealand National Party leadership election =

- 22 May 2020
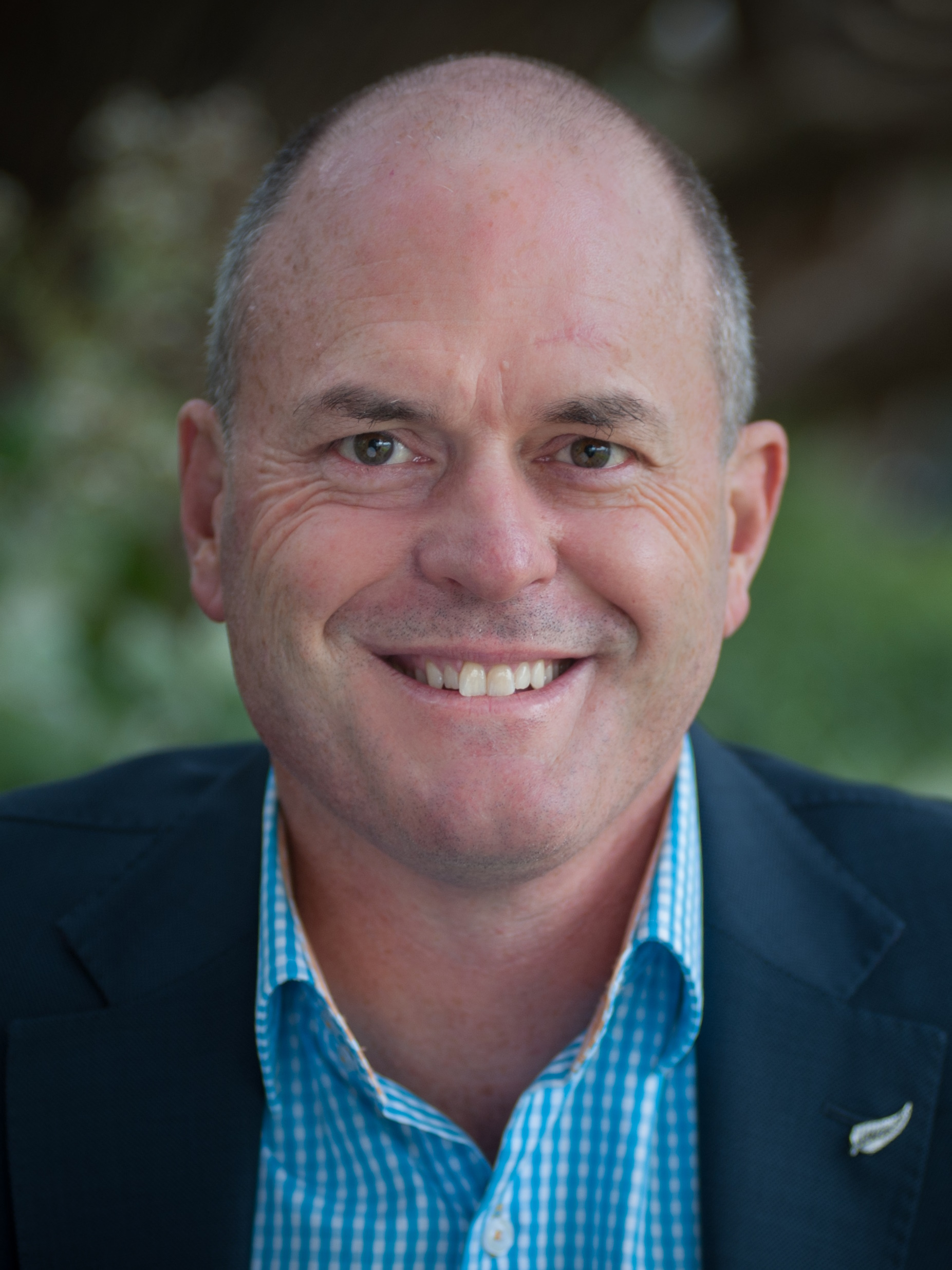

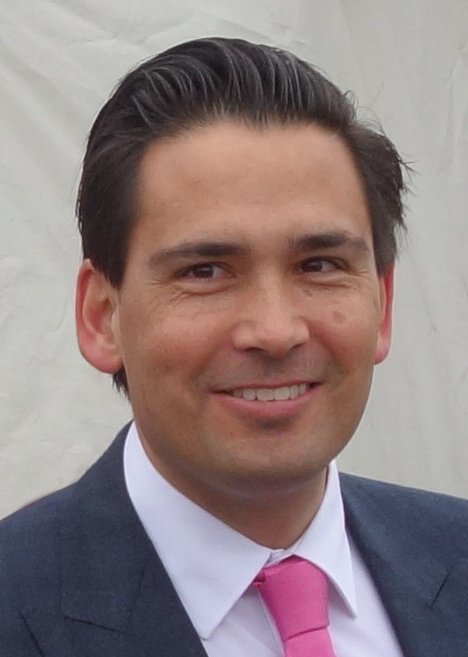
| Candidate | Todd Muller | Simon Bridges |
| Popular vote | ≥28 | <28 |
Leader before election
Simon Bridges
Leader after election
Todd Muller

May 2020 New Zealand National Party deputy leadership election
- 22 May 2020
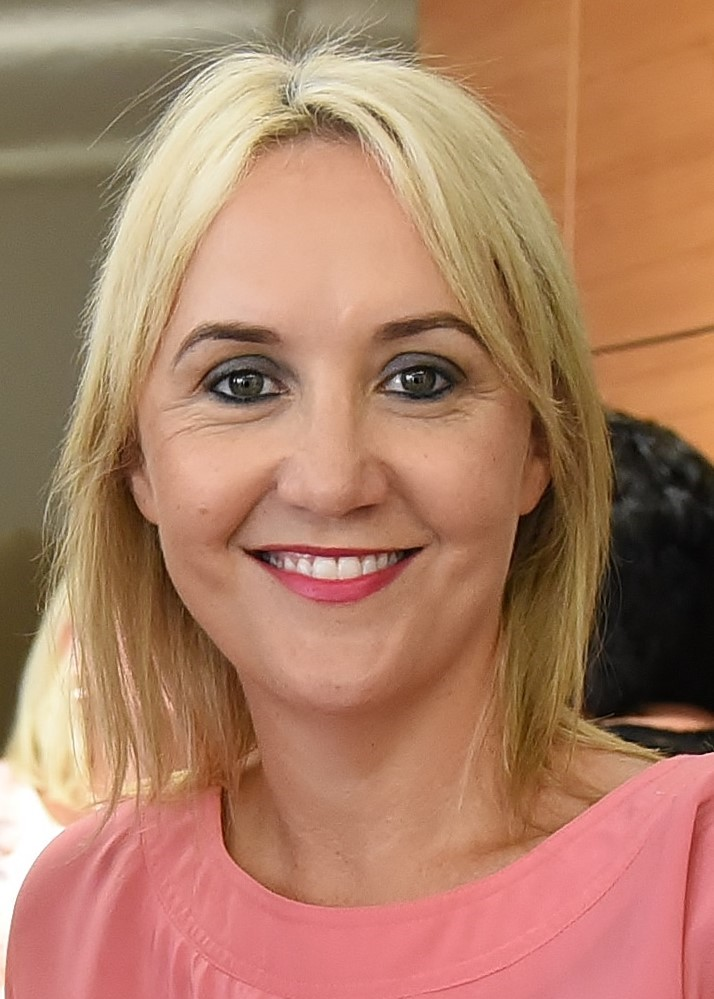

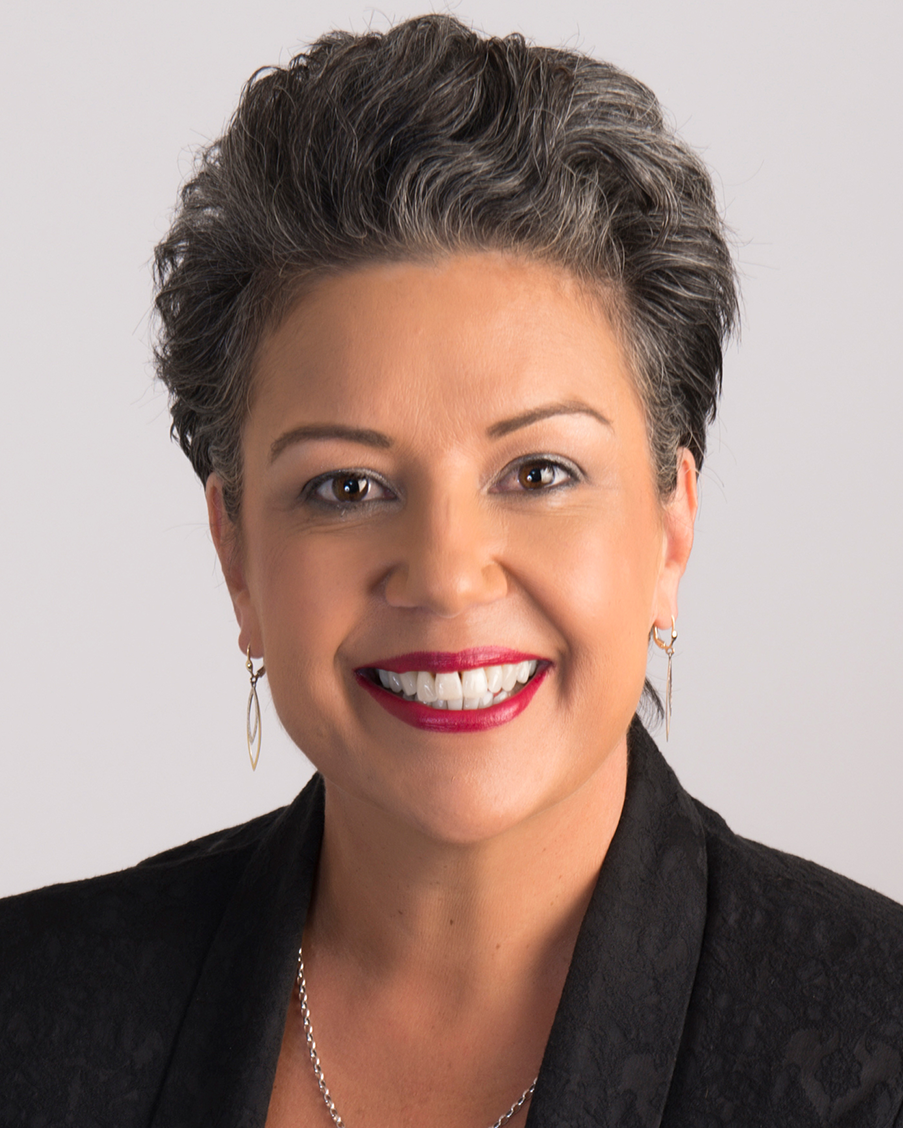
| Candidate | Nikki Kaye | Paula Bennett |
| Popular vote | ≥28 | <28 |
Deputy Leader before election
Paula Bennett
Deputy Leader after election
Nikki Kaye

An election for the parliamentary leadership of the New Zealand National Party took place in the National Party parliamentary caucus on 22 May 2020. Todd Muller and Nikki Kaye stood against the existing leader Simon Bridges and his deputy leader Paula Bennett following poor polling results. Muller and Kaye won the votes and became the new leader and deputy leader respectively.

== Background ==
After the National Party lost the 2017 election, its leader Bill English resigned and Simon Bridges won the leadership election in February 2018. Bridges had promised a "generational refresh" of a National Party in Opposition for the first time in almost a decade. Under Bridges' leadership, National continued to poll between 40% and 45% and on some polls was projected to be able to form a government with the support of ACT New Zealand. However, Bridges' personal popularity remained well below that of Prime Minister and Labour Party leader Jacinda Ardern. Despite this, he saw off an apparent challenge for the leadership made by Judith Collins in April 2019, although a leadership election was never called (Collins would later go on to win the leadership after Todd Muller). In September 2020, political commentator Matthew Hooton alleged that at this time Collins had formed a leadership ticket with Todd Muller, but they had been unable to gather sufficient support to remove Bridges.

Bridges' judgement was questioned throughout his leadership. Among other incidents, he received criticism for describing National MP Jami-Lee Ross as having "embarrassing" personal health problems ahead of Ross quitting to become an independent MP and for describing a National Party staffer as "junior" and "emotional" when he deleted, in the aftermath of the Christchurch mosque shootings, an anti-migration petition that was hosted on the Party's website. In April 2020, during New Zealand's COVID-19 pandemic, Bridges published a long Facebook post criticising the Government's response to COVID-19. The post attracted more than 25,000 comments, most of them negative. Opinion polling would show that most New Zealanders supported the Government's decision to implement a nationwide stay-at-home order and the Government's economic response. Bridges also received some criticism for choosing to drive weekly between his home in Tauranga and Parliament to chair the Epidemic Response Committee, which was meeting virtually over Zoom.

On 18 May 2020, four months before the next general election, a poll was released in which 56.5% of those surveyed would vote for Labour, compared with 30.6% for National. The same poll reported that 59.5% of those surveyed preferred Labour's leader Jacinda Ardern for prime minister, whereas Simon Bridges was preferred by only 4.5%. This was the first public poll since the COVID-19 pandemic reached New Zealand, and Labour had seen widespread support for its actions in the pandemic including from National supporters.

By 19 May, media were reporting on a challenge to Bridges' leadership, citing comments from anonymous National MPs. The same day, Muller said he had no leadership ambitions and wasn't interested in the job. However, on 20 May Muller confirmed in an email to National MPs that he would mount a challenge for the National Party leadership. Later that day the party announced that the vote would be held on 22 May.

Former National Party president Michelle Boag said that the poll was not the only reason for the leadership challenge, describing it as the "catalyst" but saying that there had been "months and months, and sometimes years, of [National] MPs having negative feedback about their leader, not only from party members but from constituents." Some National MPs told reporters that a leadership challenge by Muller had been "brewing for a while."

Muller arrived in Wellington on 21 May in order to talk with National MPs one-on-one. When asked whether Nikki Kaye was his running mate for the deputy position, he refused to comment, saying "all conversations about leadership should stay within caucus". Kaye also refused to confirm she was Muller's running mate. That night, another poll was released which had Labour at 59% and National at 29%. In this poll, which was conducted from 16 to 20 May, Bridges received 5% support as preferred prime minister, while Muller received 0.2%.

National MPs arrived at Parliament on the morning of 22 May for an emergency caucus meeting to be held at midday, many having flown into Wellington that morning. Very few would indicate which way they intended to vote, and the vote was a secret ballot.

== Candidates ==
=== Declared candidates ===
| Name | Positions | Endorsements |
|---|---|---|
| Simon Bridges | MP for Tauranga since 2008; Leader of the National Party since 2018; Leader of the Opposition since 2018 | Endorsements: Bob Clarkson, former National MP; Reported caucus support: Chris Penk; Michael Woodhouse; Louise Upston; Paula Bennett; Todd McClay; Paul Goldsmith; Anne Tolley; Publicly-announced caucus support: Sarah Dowie; Brett Hudson; Simon O'Connor |
| Todd Muller | MP for Bay of Plenty since 2014; Spokesperson for Agriculture, Biosecurity, Food Safety, Forestry since 2019 | Endorsements: Jim Bolger, former Prime Minister; Matthew Hooton, political commentator; Reported caucus support: Nikki Kaye; Chris Bishop; Amy Adams; Nicola Willis; Shane Reti; Matt King; David Bennett; Matt Doocey; David Carter; Gerry Brownlee; Nicky Wagner; Publicly-announced caucus support: Maggie Barry; Maureen Pugh; Judith Collins |

=== Declined ===
The following individuals were speculated as being possible leadership candidates, but ruled out a bid:

- Judith Collins, MP for Papakura since 2002. Collins declined to say who she would support ahead of the vote, but a month later confirmed that she had voted for Muller.
- Mark Mitchell, MP for Rodney since 2011. Mitchell pledged support to Bridges on 20 May. Despite media speculation, Mitchell confirmed on the day of the vote that he would not run in the election.

== Results ==
Todd Muller won the vote for the party leadership, and Nikki Kaye won the vote for the deputy position in a secret ballot. On 24 May, the Herald on Sunday reported that Muller may have won the leadership by a single vote. By contrast, Stuff reported that while Bridges' supporters were claiming such a margin, the margin was likely to have been wider. In October 2020 an outgoing National MP said Muller won by one vote.

== Aftermath ==
On 25 May, three days after the election, Muller announced a National caucus reshuffle, though there were only a few changes. Amy Adams, who had planned to retire at the 2020 election, instead changed her mind and was awarded the newly created "Covid-19 Recovery" portfolio. It was reported that Simon Bridges was offered the Justice portfolio; reportedly he turned it down and asked for the Foreign Affairs portfolio, but was refused it. Bridges was not given any caucus ranking but Muller said that there would be a place for Bridges in his senior leadership team should he decide to stay in politics.

Bridges announced he was staying in the party and would run again for the Tauranga electorate. After retaining the Tauranga electorate in the 2020 general election, Bridges resigned as a Member of Parliament on 15 March 2022, causing a byelection for his seat.

Paula Bennett announced on 29 June her intention to retire from politics at the 2020 general election. Her announcement prompted a second caucus reshuffle; in this reshuffle Bridges was given the Foreign Affairs portfolio he wanted and a caucus ranking of 17.

Muller held the position of National Party leader for less than two months. Muller would later reveal that he suffered severe panic attacks, starting five days after his election, which became worse as the days went on, until he found himself unable to get out of bed. On 14 July 2020, he resigned as leader, saying: "the role has taken a heavy toll on me personally, and on my family, and this has become untenable from a health perspective." This triggered the second leadership election in 2020.
