= Jake Bezzant =

New Zealand politician and businessman

Personal details
- Born: 1987 or 1988 (age 37–38) Cambridge, New Zealand
- Education: University of Waikato
- Profession: Electric Vehicle Charging / Clean Energy / Energy as a Service

Jacob Max Bezzant (1988) is co-founder and CEO of Invisible Urban Charging, a “charging as a service” solutions provider for commercial real estate. He was a former political candidate for the New Zealand National Party and a former CEO of Parking Sense USA.

== Early life ==
Bezzant was born in Cambridge in 1987 or 1988. He attended Cambridge High School and the University of Waikato, where he earned a degree in Law and Politics/International Relations.

Bezzant played cricket for the Furnace Old Boys Cricket Club, Hamilton, Iikely, MCC, and Yorkshire Gentleman. He recorded his first century in Furnace Old Boys' victory over Lonestar Hamilton Boys' High School in the first round of Hamilton club cricket's Eddy Marr Bowl competition. He also played for Northern Districts Maori, the first Maori domestic representative cricket team in New Zealand cricketing history.

== Professional career ==
=== Invisible Urban Charging ===
In 2019, Bezzant co-founded Invisible Urban Charging (IUC), an electric vehicle “charging as a service” solutions provider for commercial real estate locations, with Nigel Broomhall. As of 2020, Bezzant was a 42% shareholder of IUC, which raised money in 2021 using PledgeMe.

In 2024, IUC formed a strategic agreement with CBRE Group, Inc. to deploy one million EV chargers in the next five years, with IUC as its preferred partner for large asset-class properties, including public lots, shopping centers, large offices, and hospitality sites. That same year, IUC entered into a partnership with Icon Parking to deploy 5,000 chargers at Icon lots throughout New York City.

== Mexico $500m ==
Invisible Urban Charging Inc. (IUC) and ATX Smart Mobility will oversee an initial investment of $500 million, with plans to begin in the coming months in the Bajío region.

The project involves installing 38 electric chargers and operating 140 electric buses, as part of an effort to promote sustainable transportation in Mexico. The company will also provide a software platform for charging point owners and an application that will allow drivers to locate and use these services.

For its part, Miami-based ATX Smart Mobility will contribute artificial intelligence- based technology to optimize public transport routes and improve energy use in mobility systems.

The agreement was finalized in partnership with the real estate firm CBRE Group, which will be responsible for selecting the locations for the charging centers and providing installation and maintenance services.

The main objective is to strengthen the infrastructure for commercial fleets. Jake Bezzant, CEO of IUC, explains the logic behind this approach: “If we do what we need to in the fleet segment, it will create an environment where the everyday user will have the necessary infrastructure to easily make the decision to switch to electric.”

=== Parking Sense ===
Bezzant was named Chief Executive Officer of Parking Sense USA in 2016. He was initially identified by then CEO Paul Collins to work for the parking operator while still at University. Under his leadership, Parking Sense USA won a contract with Los Angeles County Metropolitan Transportation Authority (LA Metro) to supply parking guidance for over 21,000 parking spaces across Los Angeles.

Bezzant stated that he was co-founder of the company Parking Sense and told a magazine that the company “grew from the lounge of my university flat”, but company records for its incorporation do not list him as a founding director or shareholder, and Paul Collins, another person associated with the company, said that Bezzant joined the company six months after it was founded and was not involved while he was at university.

A BusinessDesk article said that Bezzant had to leave his job as CEO at Parking Sense "after disagreements over multi-million dollar contracts and 'fantasy' projects, including a Texas development now mired in bankruptcy and fraud allegations," adding that “there is no suggestion they are linked to Bezzant.” Parking Sense did confirm Bezzant was removed as CEO due to the disagreements.

An article in The Spinoff commenting on the BusinessDesk report said, "There's a lot of he said, he said about whether or not Bezzant has been entirely accurate”. National Party president Peter Goodfellow said the matter was “thoroughly investigated” and that the party "accepts Jake's position about his time at Parking Sense."

== Political career ==
In November 2019, Bezzant sought to be the National Party candidate in the Botany electorate after incumbent National MP Jami-Lee Ross became an independent MP, but National instead gave the candidacy to former Air New Zealand chief executive Christopher Luxon.

A month later, Bezzant was selected as the National Party candidate for the Upper Harbour electorate, following Paula Bennett's decision to become a list MP. At the 2020 general election, like many National MPs and candidates, Bezzant lost his electorate. While Bennett had a 9,000-vote majority, Bezzant lost to Labour's Vanushi Walters by 2,392 votes (Bezzant received 38% of the electorate vote compared to Walters' 44%).

Bezzant resigned from the National Party in 2021.

== Misconduct allegations ==
On 31 May 2021, Bezzant's former partner began a podcast called Whips, Chains and Brains and in its first episode alleged that Bezzant had used intimate photos of her on the internet to impersonate her and to engage in online sex with other men. While the police investigated the matter, they determined a crime had not been committed. Bezzant's former partner alleged that he had taunted her over the police's decision. Bezzant told one news outlet that the allegations were untrue, and said in a statement that "Personal relationship break ups sometimes get messy. Two sides to every story. There is more than just her and I involved so I am going to respect that and so I am not going to discuss it." On 3 June 2021, another former partner alleged that Bezzant had also created a Snapchat account using her name, and was using this account to trick men into sending nude images.

Bezzant resigned from the National Party; this was announced on 2 June 2021. The National Party stated that day that “we looked into the matter, and Mr Bezzant is no longer a member of the National Party.” Judith Collins, the party's leader, said that she became aware of the allegations in the evening of 1 June. She labelled Bezzant a "fantasist" and "possible sociopath" and suggested that the National Party needs to overhaul their candidate selection process.

The allegations led to Prime Minister Jacinda Ardern saying that her government will see if the law needs to be changed to cover similar incidents.
