= Epidemic Response Committee =

Select committee in New Zealand

The Epidemic Response Committee was a select committee of the New Zealand House of Representatives. It was established on 25 March 2020 during the 52nd Parliament while the House of Representatives was adjourned because of the coronavirus pandemic. The committee was disestablished on 26 May 2020, after normal parliamentary sittings had resumed.

== History ==
On 25 March 2020, meetings of the House of Representatives were adjourned for more than one month while the country locked down to contain the coronavirus pandemic in New Zealand. Before adjourning, the House unanimously passed emergency legislation, created sessional rules to enable written questions asked of Ministers to be answered under more flexible timeframes, and established a cross-party committee to scrutinise the government's management of the pandemic. The motion to establish the Epidemic Response Committee was proposed by the Leader of the House, Chris Hipkins, and supported by Gerry Brownlee, Tracey Martin, James Shaw and David Seymour on behalf of their parties. Brownlee, the shadow leader of the House, said the committee would fill the gap left by the absence of Question Time.

The purpose of the committee was to hold the government to account with regards to its response to the coronavirus pandemic, in lieu of standard parliamentary scrutiny like oral questions and debates. In the motion establishing the committee, it was given the power to "send for persons, papers and records," which is not normally a power that New Zealand select committees have. The Speaker of the House, Trevor Mallard, indicated his expectation that this power would be used "to effectively interrogate ministers or public servants on their actions around the pandemic."

The committee met 24 times. Its meetings were conducted using Zoom and were livestreamed. Each meeting had a theme, such as media or tourism, and consisted of briefings to members followed by opportunities for members to question ministers, senior public servants, or experts.

On 26 May 2020 the committee was disestablished. Hipkins moved the disestablishment motion, stating the committee was no longer needed as New Zealand had relaxed its pandemic control settings and Parliament could function largely as it did pre lockdown. The motion was opposed by the National Party, ACT New Zealand, and conservative independent Jami-Lee Ross but passed with the support of the government, 63–57. Calls to "bring back the Epidemic Response Committee" were occasionally issued in the subsequent 53rd Parliament, but were resisted by the re-elected government.

== Membership ==
The committee had eleven members. Permanent members of the committee were Simon Bridges, the then Leader of the Opposition, as chairperson and David Seymour as the sole member of ACT New Zealand. Other members were made up from the various parties represented in parliament: four further National Party members, three members from the Labour Party, and one member each from the Green Party and New Zealand First. The committee therefore had an opposition majority. Michael Woodhouse, the National Party health spokesperson, was designated as deputy chair on 5 May 2020.

The membership of the committee was as follows:

Key

National Labour Green NZ First ACT

Name	Portrait	Electorate
Simon Bridges		Tauranga
Kiri Allan		List
Paula Bennett		Upper Harbour
Marama Davidson		List
Ruth Dyson		Port Hills
Paul Goldsmith		List
Shane Reti		Whangarei
David Seymour		Epsom
Fletcher Tabuteau		List
Michael Wood		Mount Roskill
Michael Woodhouse		List
