= 2018 Green Party of Aotearoa New Zealand co-leadership election =

Leadership election within the New Zealand Green Party

- 8 April 2018
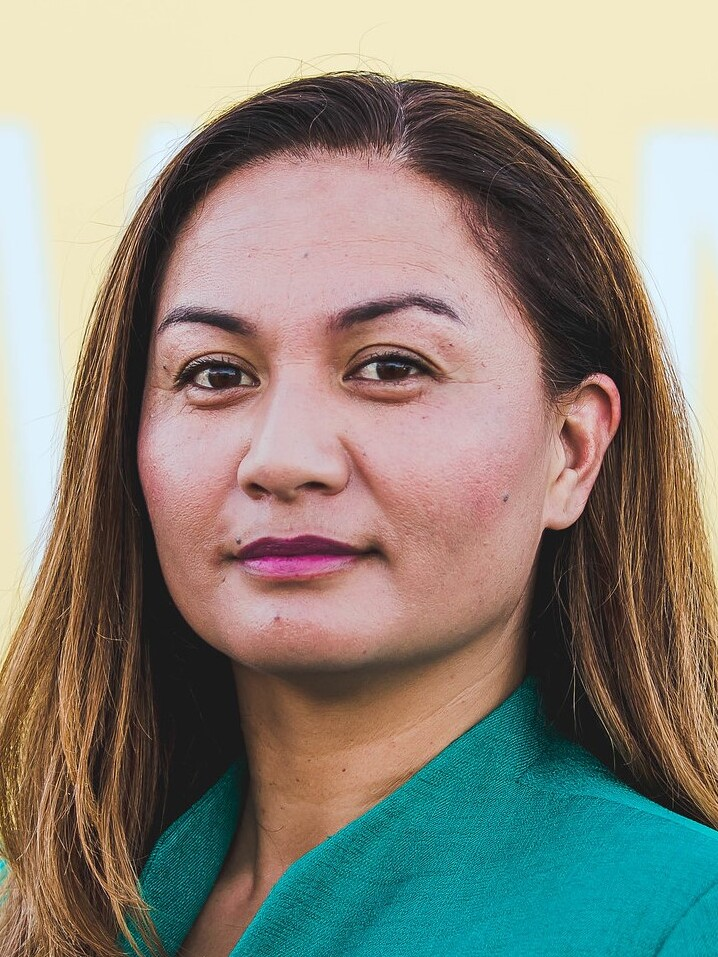

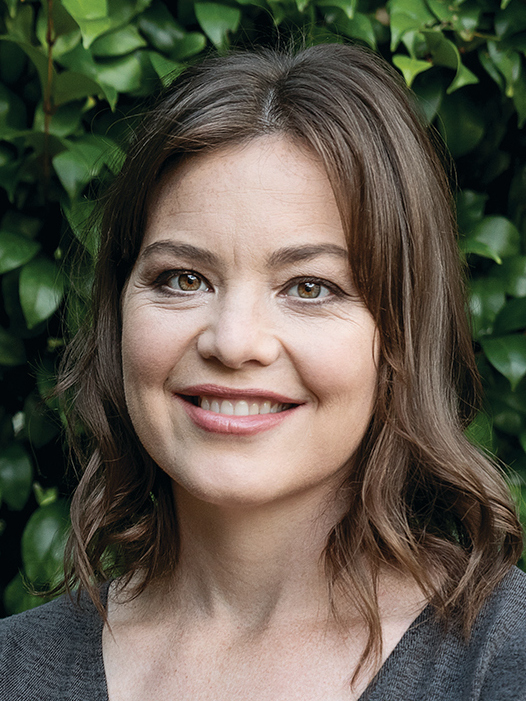
Candidate	Marama Davidson	Julie Anne Genter
Popular vote	110	34
Percentage	76.38	23.62
Co-leader before election
Metiria Turei
Co-leader after election
Marama Davidson

An election took place between 26 March and 7 April 2018 to elect one of the two co-leaders of the Green Party of Aotearoa New Zealand.

== Background ==
On 9 August 2017, Metiria Turei announced she had stood down as co-leader of the Green Party following media scrutiny of her public admission to committing benefit fraud in the early 1990s, stating that the "scrutiny on [her] family has become unbearable." This triggered an election to fill the now vacant female co-leadership, which the party had previously stated would be conducted at the 2018 party annual general meeting. It had been possible that a Special General Meeting or postal ballot may have been used to elect a new co-leader earlier.

On 26 January 2018, James Shaw announced the election timeline to determine the next female co-leader, with the ballots to be counted and a winner to be announced on 8 April 2018. Following the election, Marama Davidson was elected the new female co-leader of the Green Party.

== Key dates ==
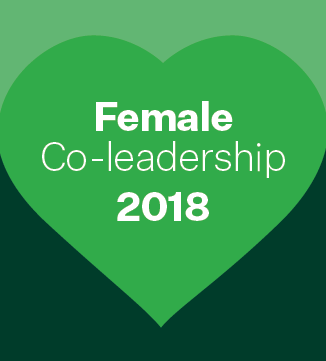
Logo used for the contest

- Friday 2 February – Nominations open
- Friday 9 February – Nominations close
- Monday 12 February – Full list of nominations announced
- Saturday 3 March – Co-leader candidate session held at Green Party policy conference in Napier
- Sunday 25 March – Zoom conference to be held between candidates and delegates.
- Monday 26 March – End of official campaigning, balloting opens
- Saturday 7 April – Balloting closes
- Sunday 8 April – Ballots counted and winner announced

== Candidates ==
=== Declared candidates ===
The following individuals announced their candidacy:

Name	Position	Notes
Marama Davidson	List MP since 2015: Deputy-Musterer	Davidson held a Facebook event on 4 February for an "announcement", but would not tell the press what the topic would be. Media had hypothesized the event as being a candidacy declaration. On the same day, Davidson announced her candidacy for co-leader.
Julie Anne Genter	List MP since 2011: Minister for Women; Associate Minister of Transport; Associate Minister of Health	Genter had been described as one of the top contenders to take over as co-leader, but hadn't yet commented on any leadership aspirations. Following Turei's resignation, Genter said she was still to make a decision on her candidacy, but might do so when dates were finalised. She announced her candidacy on 8 February.

=== Declined ===
The following individuals were speculated as being possible leadership candidates, but ruled out a bid:

Golriz Ghahraman

Ghahraman, elected as a List MP in 2017 (following special votes being cast) said to media she was "not at all" interested in the position of co-leader.

Jan Logie

A List MP since 2011 and Under-Secretary for Justice since 2017, Jan Logie did not respond to media requests for comment regarding the co-leadership. The press speculated that after Davidson announced her candidacy Logie ruled out running herself.

Deborah Morris-Travers

Former Green Party Chief of Staff Deborah Morris-Travers, who was replaced following Turei's admission to benefit fraud due to her involvement, ruled out a bid for the co-leadership herself.

Denise Roche

Former Green List MP (2011–17) and Auckland City Councillor (2007–10) Denise Roche ruled herself out of standing.

Eugenie Sage

Sage, a List MP since 2011 and since 2017 Minister of Conservation and Minister for Land Information as well as a member of the Green Party's negotiation team with Labour, said she had not yet made any decision; "I'm still getting my feet under the table as a minister." There had been widespread speculation that Sage would put her hand up as a "compromise candidate". Ultimately, she ruled out standing citing a desire to focus on her ministerial duties instead.

Chlöe Swarbrick

Elected as a List MP in 2017, Chlöe Swarbrick declined to stand stating it was "too early" in her career to be co-leader.

== Debates ==
On 1 March a live-streamed debate between Davidson and Genter was held in the Legislative Council Chambers, Wellington hosted by Henry Cooke. Davidson and Genter again met in a debate hosted by Lisa Owen on Newshub Nation on 10 March, and in another hosted by Mihingarangi Forbes on The Hui on 11 March.

== Result ==
The voting was conducted by delegates from electorates across the country. The following table gives the ballot results:

Candidate	Votes	%
Marama Davidson	110	76.38
Julie Anne Genter	34	23.62
Majority	76	52.77
Turnout	144	—N/a

== See also ==
- 2017 New Zealand general election
- 2018 New Zealand National Party leadership election
