= Simon Bridges =

New Zealand politician and lawyer

The Honourable Simon Bridges
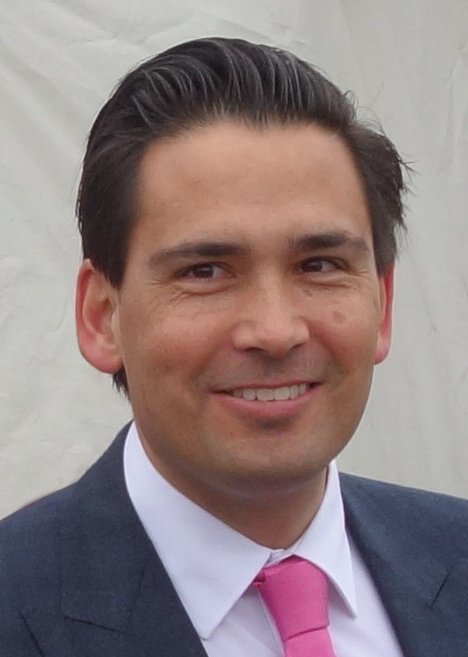
- Bridges in 2015

37th Leader of the Opposition
- In office 27 February 2018 – 22 May 2020
- Prime Minister: Jacinda Ardern
- Deputy: Paula Bennett
- Preceded by: Bill English
- Succeeded by: Todd Muller

12th Leader of the National Party
- In office 27 February 2018 – 22 May 2020
- Deputy: Paula Bennett
- Preceded by: Bill English
- Succeeded by: Todd Muller

10th Shadow Leader of the House
- In office 2 November 2017 – 27 February 2018
- Leader: Bill English
- Preceded by: Chris Hipkins
- Succeeded by: Gerry Brownlee

10th Leader of the House
- In office 2 May 2017 – 26 October 2017
- Prime Minister: Bill English
- Deputy: Michael Woodhouse
- Preceded by: Gerry Brownlee
- Succeeded by: Chris Hipkins

Minister of Economic Development
- In office 20 December 2016 – 26 October 2017
- Prime Minister: Bill English
- Preceded by: Steven Joyce
- Succeeded by: David Parker

26th Minister of Transport
- In office 6 October 2014 – 26 October 2017
- Prime Minister: John Key; Bill English
- Preceded by: Gerry Brownlee
- Succeeded by: Phil Twyford

24th Minister for Communications
- In office 20 December 2016 – 26 October 2017
- Prime Minister: Bill English
- Preceded by: Amy Adams
- Succeeded by: Clare Curran (Communications and Digital Media)

Member of the New Zealand Parliament for Tauranga
- In office 8 November 2008 – 6 May 2022
- Preceded by: Bob Clarkson
- Succeeded by: Sam Uffindell
- Majority: 1,856

Personal details
- Born: Simon Joseph Bridges; 12 October 1976 (age 50) Auckland, New Zealand
- Party: National
- Relations: Simon O'Connor (brother-in-law)
- Education: University of Auckland (BA, LLB); London School of Economics; St Catherine's College, Oxford (BCL)
- Website: Official website

Simon Joseph Bridges (born 12 October 1976) is a New Zealand former politician, broadcaster and lawyer. He served as Leader of the National Party and Leader of the Opposition between 2018 and 2020, and as the Member of Parliament for Tauranga from the 2008 election to May 2022, when he resigned. Bridges is the first and currently the only Māori person to serve as leader of a major political party in New Zealand.

A self-described "compassionate conservative", Bridges served in several Cabinet positions, including Minister of Transport (2014–2017) and Minister of Economic Development (2016–2017). He took the role of Leader of the House from May to October 2017. Bridges was elected as National Party leader on 27 February 2018, succeeding former Prime Minister Bill English, who resigned. On 22 May 2020, following poor polling for the party, Bridges was challenged for the party leadership and replaced by Todd Muller, who would relinquish the leadership less than two months later.

On 24 November 2021, Bridges was sacked from the shadow cabinet of Judith Collins, who cited a crude comment he made in 2016 to fellow MP Jacqui Dean. Collins's actions triggered a successful vote of no-confidence in her leadership the following day.

Bridges announced his retirement from politics in March 2022 to spend more time with his family, triggering a by-election. He subsequently became CEO of the Auckland Business Chamber. He also began a career in broadcasting, launching his podcast Generally Famous with Stuff in 2022, and in 2024 became Chairperson of Waka Kotahi.

== Early life ==
Simon Bridges was born in October 1976 in Auckland, the youngest of six children. His father, of Māori and Pākehā (New Zealand European) descent, was a Baptist minister, and his mother, a Pākehā from Waihi, was a primary school teacher. His father Heath's mother, Naku Joseph, was a member of Ngāti Kinohaku, a hapū (subtribe) of the Ngāti Maniapoto tribe, and associated with Oparure Marae near Te Kūiti, through which Bridges has family connections to former Labour Cabinet Minister Koro Wētere.

Bridges grew up in Te Atatū, West Auckland, and attended Rutherford College. There, he was taught by future Labour Education Minister Chris Carter, and became head boy of the college. He went on to complete a Bachelor of Arts in political science and history, and a Bachelor of Laws (Hons) at the University of Auckland.

== Legal career ==
Bridges began his legal career as a litigation lawyer in a major Auckland law firm, Kensington Swan. He moved to Tauranga in 2001 to take up a position as a Crown prosecutor in the District and High Courts. During this time, he took leave to travel to the United Kingdom to study at the London School of Economics and Political Science, and later to complete a postgraduate law degree at St Catherine's College, Oxford; he also worked as an intern in the British House of Commons. As a Crown prosecutor in Tauranga, Bridges mainly worked on jury trials. Bridges ended his legal career in 2008, when he was nominated by the National Party to stand for election to the New Zealand Parliament.

== Early political career ==
Bridges became a member of the Young Nationals in 1992 at the age of 16 and was elected Deputy New Zealand Chair in 1997. He was active in National's West Auckland organisation as a member of MP Brian Neeson's electorate team. Bridges supported Neeson against a challenge by John Key for the National Party candidacy to contest the new seat of Helensville at the 2002 general election. In the following years, Bridges held several senior positions within the party, including sitting on the party's rules committee and serving as chairperson of the Tauranga National Party branch.

== Member of Parliament ==
New Zealand Parliament
Years	Term	Electorate	List	Party
2008–2011	49th	Tauranga	51	National
2011–2014	50th	Tauranga	30	National
2014–2017	51st	Tauranga	18	National
2017–2020	52nd	Tauranga	6	National
2020–2022	53rd	Tauranga	4	National

=== Election to Parliament: 2008–2011 ===
In 2008 the incumbent National MP for the Tauranga electorate Bob Clarkson announced his intention not to stand for re-election. Bridges then announced his candidacy for the party's selection to stand in the electorate, and resigned from his roles within the party. In June 2008 Bridges was selected as the party's candidate for the electorate. He was placed at No. 51 on National's party list. Several opinion polls during the campaign suggested Bridges was likely to win the seat by a large margin.

Bridges won the seat with a majority of 11,742 votes, against a field of 11 candidates, including New Zealand First leader Winston Peters. As New Zealand First did not meet the 5% party vote threshold nationally, it was reliant on at least one candidate winning an electorate seat to be represented in Parliament, and Winston Peters's Tauranga candidacy had been its best chance that year.

Bridges sponsored a Private Member's Bill to increase penalties for animal cruelty, which was drawn from the ballot in early 2010. After passing its first reading, the Animal Welfare Amendment Bill was adopted by the Minister of Agriculture David Carter as a Government Bill and was passed into law.

=== Minister: 2012–2017 ===
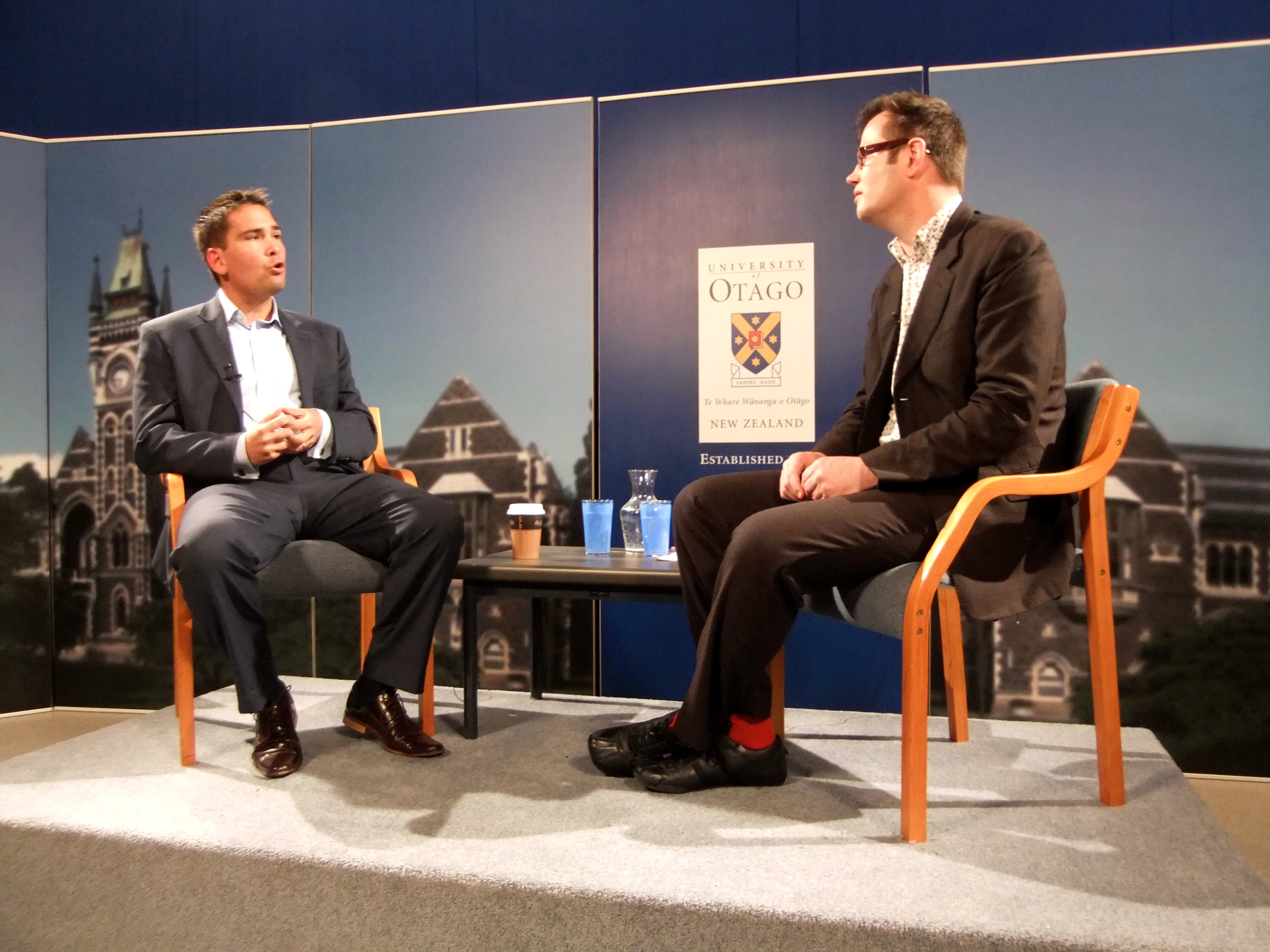
Bridges speaking to Bryce Edwards at a 2011 election event

Bridges was re-elected for Tauranga in the 2011 election. In April 2012, Prime Minister John Key appointed him as a Minister outside Cabinet, as Minister for Consumer Affairs, Associate Minister of Transport, and Associate Minister for Climate Change Issues. In January 2013 Bridges moved into the Cabinet and became Minister of Labour and Minister of Energy and Resources. He continued as Associate Minister for Climate Change Issues, but was no longer Minister of Consumer Affairs and Associate Minister of Transport.

Bridges made regular appearances on TVNZ's Breakfast programme as part of the "Young Guns" feature, in which he appeared alongside Labour MP Jacinda Ardern.

In April 2013 Bridges voted against the Marriage (Definition of Marriage) Amendment Bill, a bill allowing same-sex couples to marry in New Zealand.

In October 2013, during a TV interview on Campbell Live, Bridges and presenter John Campbell became engaged in a heated discussion about the benefits and risks of offshore oil drilling.

In April 2014, environmental activist group Greenpeace launched a campaign calling for Bridges to be removed as Energy and Resources Minister over an allegation he approved potential oil and gas exploration in Victoria Forest Park, West Coast, but later said he was unaware of having given the approval. Opponents perceived that Bridges had wrongly approved the exploration in a sensitive area, however this was denied by Bridges and John Key.

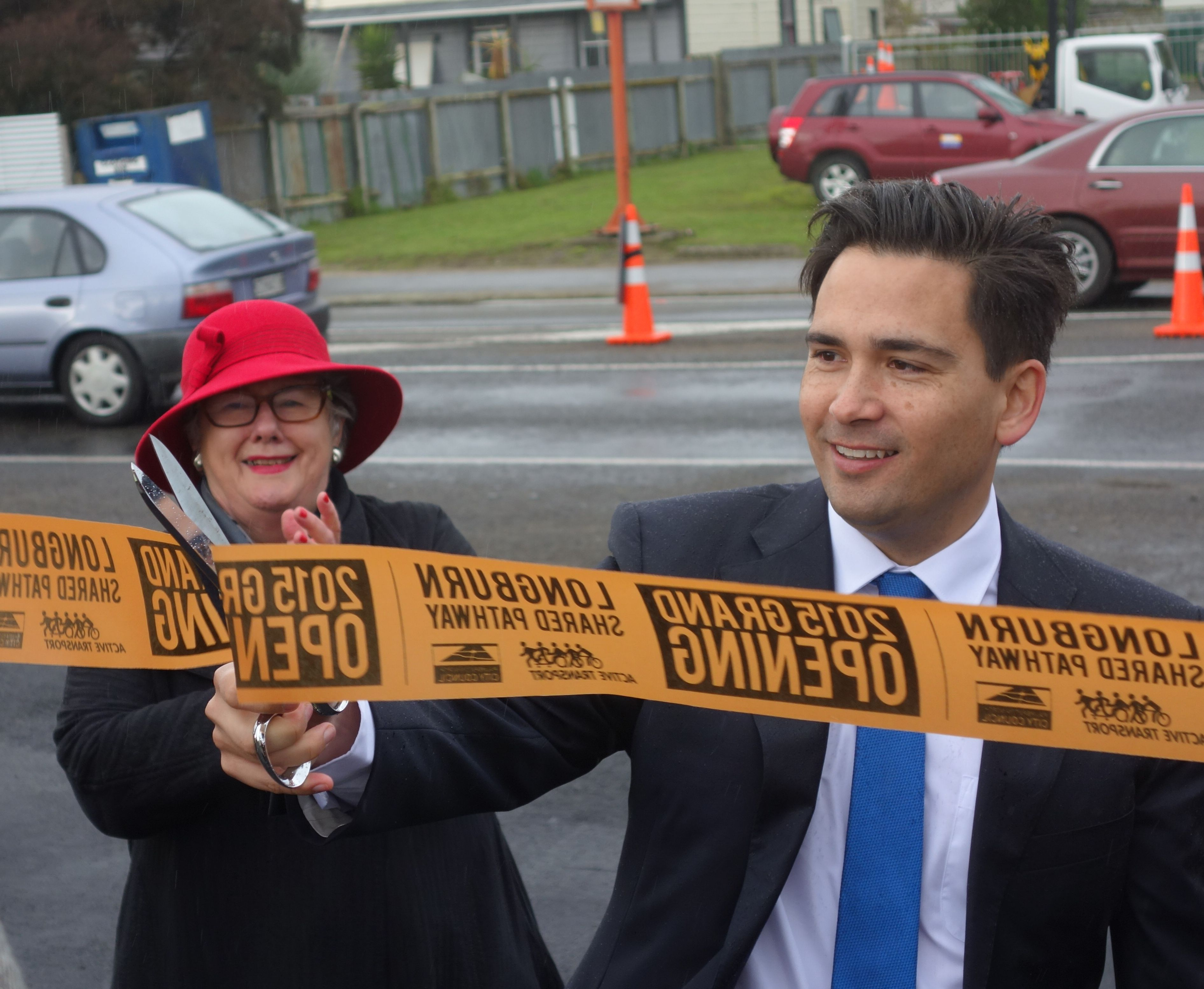
Bridges, as Transport Minister, opens a cycle route in Palmerston North

On 9 March 2015, when a by-election was scheduled to be held in the Northland electorate on 28 March, the National Party candidate Mark Osborne announced with Bridges (then Minister of Transport) that National pledged to upgrade 10 one-lane bridges in the region at a cost of up to $69 million. Opponents criticised the government for using its advantage inappropriately in the Northland by-election campaign, especially since it was later revealed that Bridges had asked officials for information on the 10 one-lane bridges days before the announcement. However, John Key defended the request because Bridges had sought factual information rather than policy advice, which is permitted under the Cabinet Manual rules.

Following the resignation of John Key from the prime ministership on 5 December 2016, Bridges announced his candidacy for the Deputy Leadership of the National Party and consequent Deputy Prime Ministership. He withdrew from the election process when it became clear Paula Bennett had the numbers to win.

New Prime Minister Bill English made changes to the Cabinet effective 20 December 2016, and Bridges became Minister for Economic Development, Minister for Communications, and Associate Minister of Finance. He retained his role as Minister of Transport and was no longer Minister of Energy and Resources, and Associate Minister of Justice, and Climate Change Issues.

=== Opposition: 2017–2022 ===
Simon Bridges was re-elected in the 2017 election. Following the defeat of the National government, Bridges was no longer a minister, but was appointed Shadow Leader of the House, and National spokesperson for the portfolios for both Economic and Regional Development, and Immigration. Bridges realised his desire to hold office was now out of reach, but he hoped to be New Zealand’s first Māori prime minister, ideally at the next election.

In February 2018, Bill English resigned as the leader of the National Party, paving way for a leadership contest. In a press conference held the day after English's resignation, Bridges announced his candidacy for the leadership of the party. On 27 February 2018, he was elected as National Party leader, thus also becoming Leader of the Opposition. He is the first person with Māori ancestry to serve as leader of the National Party. Bridges announced his Shadow Cabinet appointments on 11 March 2018. Paula Bennett served as his deputy.

==== MP expenses saga ====
On 13 August 2018 Newshub reported that Bridges had spent $113,000 in taxpayer money on limousines and hotels between April and June 2018. (His expenses were higher than normal because he was travelling around New Zealand on a 'getting to know Simon' road-show.) Information on Bridges's spending emerged in a leak of MPs' expenses. In response, the National Party demanded an independent inquiry into the source of the leak. Bridges publicly stated that he was "supremely confident" that his MPs were not behind the leak. On 15 August, Speaker of the House Trevor Mallard launched an independent inquiry into who had leaked information about Bridges's expenses.

On 24 August 2018 RNZ reported that a person claiming to be the National Party leaker had sent separate anonymous text messages to Bridges and to Mallard calling for the inquiry into the leaking of Bridges's expenses to be called off. The author of the text alleged that they had suffered from mental health problems and claimed that the publicity would endanger their health and life. In response, Mallard subsequently called off the inquiry, prompting criticism from both Bridges and Shadow leader of the House Gerry Brownlee, who demanded that the investigation into the identity of the leaker continue. Bridges claimed that the New Zealand Police were reportedly aware of the leaker's identity.

At a press conference on 15 October 2018, Bridges implied that National MP Jami-Lee Ross had leaked his (Bridges's) expenses. Bridges cited a PwC report which strongly suggested that Ross had been the leaker, based on text messages sent to a Radio New Zealand reporter, the Speaker of the House, and a police officer in the Botany electorate during the leak. Bridges also rejected claims made by Ross in a series of tweets alleging that Bridges had been trying to pin the blame on him for questioning his leadership decisions. Bridges also indicated that National would seek disciplinary action against Ross.

On 16 October 2018, Ross alleged that Bridges had violated election law several times, including accepting an illegal NZ$100,000 donation in May 2018, which Ross claimed that Bridges had told him to cover up. The donation came from a businessman, Yikun Zhang, connected to the Chinese Communist Party. In addition, Ross alleged that Bridges and Deputy Leader Paula Bennett had tried to smear him with allegations that he had sexually harassed several women. Bridges publicly denied Ross's allegations as baseless and said it was a matter for the police. That same day, the National Party caucus voted to expel Ross for disloyalty. Ross announced his intention to stay in parliament as an independent MP.

On 29 January 2020, the Serious Fraud Office filed criminal charges against four people in relation to an alleged NZ$100,000 donation paid into a National Party electorate bank account. Bridges stated neither he nor anyone from National Party are among those who have been charged in relation to the donation allegations. The Serious Fraud Office launched an investigation on 12 March 2019, after police referred on a complaint made by Ross.

==== 2020 COVID-19 pandemic ====
On 24 March, it was reported that Bridges would lead a cross-party select committee that would scrutinise the Government's response to the COVID-19 pandemic in New Zealand. The cross-party Epidemic Response Committee would run in the absence of the New Zealand Parliament, which would adjourn for five weeks on 25 March. Two thirds of members will be from the opposition National and ACT parties while the rest will come from the governing Labour-New Zealand First-Greens coalition government.

On 6 April, Bridges drew media attention when he admitted that despite the advice against long road trips during the pandemic lockdown he was commuting back and forth between Tauranga and Wellington to chair the committee, even though its proceedings were being conducted by video conference. He said that he had not considered basing his family in Wellington, as Jacinda Ardern had done, and that his actions were "absolutely an appropriate way of doing things." Later that day he also said that his internet was unreliable, and that he needed to be close to the Press Gallery and other media. The next day, he downplayed the issue of his internet connection after it was reported that his home has fibre and ultra-fast broadband. He also said that the "resources and focus" available from his physical presence in Wellington were of use, and that it was not practicable for him to relocate there completely. Bridges's actions were defended by both the left-wing blogger Martyn Bradbury and right-wing blogger David Farrar, who compared him favourably to Health Minister David Clark's lapses during the lockdown.

On 16 April, Simon Bridges called upon the New Zealand Government to lift the level 4 lockdown the following week to help struggling businesses that were affected by the lockdown. Bridges's disagreement with the decision to extend the lockdown was poorly received, prompting Deputy Leader Paula Bennett to issue a statement claiming that Bridges had the support of National's caucus. On 23 April, a man was charged in court for threatening to kill Bridges and his family in a Facebook post.

==== 2020 New Zealand National Party leadership challenge ====
On 18 May, a Newshub Reid Research public opinion poll was released, which recorded Bridges's preferred Prime Minister rating at 4.5% and voting intention for National at 30.6%, in contrast to Prime Minister Ardern and Labour's high approval rating. In response to Bridges's low approval rating, National MPs Todd Muller and Nikki Kaye mounted a challenge for the leadership and deputy leadership of the National Party. An emergency caucus meeting was held on 22 May to determine the party's leadership, resulting in him losing his position as leader of the National Party and Leader of the Opposition.

==== Todd Muller Shadow Cabinet ====
On 2 July 2020, Bridges was allocated the foreign affairs portfolio in Todd Muller's shadow cabinet and was moved down to the number 17 spot on the National Party list.

==== Judith Collins Shadow Cabinet ====
Following the election of Judith Collins as National's leader, Bridges was moved to the number four spot on the National Party List. Besides retaining his foreign affairs portfolio, Bridges also assumed the justice portfolio.

During the 2020 general election, Bridges retained his seat in Tauranga by a final margin of 1,856 votes. National was returned for a second term in opposition; in the post-election portfolio reshuffle, Bridges was named spokesperson for justice, water, Pike River Mine re-entry and Māori–Crown relations.

On 19 February 2021 Bridges attracted media attention when he criticised Police Commissioner Andrew Coster's efforts to combat gang and gun violence in New Zealand. Bridges described Coster as a "wokester commissioner" in a Twitter post. On 25 February, Bridges clashed with Coster during a select committee hearing, criticising the New Zealand Police's "policing by consent" policies and asking whether the Police still conducted arrests.

Bridges criticised Coster again in June 2021, claiming on Twitter that he witnessed a gang fight in the car park of a Tauranga hospital and adding "Just another day in the Bay of Plenty". Police confirmed that an altercation took place but denied any gang involvement. Further investigation revealed that a patched Mongrel Mob member had helped jump start a vehicle in the parking lot shortly before an unrelated incident took place over a parking space.

In August 2021 Bridges published a book National Identity: Confessions of an Outsider.

On 24 November 2021—amid speculation that Bridges was considering challenging Collins for the leadership—he was unexpectedly demoted from Collins's shadow cabinet over allegations of "serious misconduct" after it emerged that he had made an inappropriate comment to fellow National Party MP Jacqui Dean during an interaction in 2017. Bridges said he previously offered a private apology to Dean regarding his comment. Collins was accused of using the allegation to smear him so he could not succeed her, as she was seen to believe a leadership challenge was inevitable due to severe unpopularity. This claim was justified by espousers because Bridges was always seen to pose a significant threat to her leadership, as the figurehead of the party's moderate faction. Bridges responded by calling his sacking "desperate" on Collins's part, while acknowledging that he had "engaged in some old wives' tales about [my wives and children] and how to have a girl" around Dean, and called some of his statements "clearly inappropriate".

Collins's demotion of Bridges led members of the National Party's parliamentary caucus to call for a vote of no confidence in her leadership on 25 November. Deputy leader Shane Reti assumed the role of interim leader, with a leadership vote scheduled for 30 November.

==== Christopher Luxon Shadow Cabinet ====
Though Bridges initially announced that he would be running for the leadership of the National Party he subsequently withdrew from the contest and endorsed Christopher Luxon as leader on 30 November. Luxon was subsequently elected by the party caucus as National Party leader that same day. In Luxon’s Cabinet he was given spot number 3 and the portfolios of Finance and Infrastructure.

Bridges was one of only eight MPs to vote against the Conversion Practices Prohibition Legislation Act 2022 in mid-February 2022.

==== Retirement ====
Bridges announced his retirement from politics in March 2022 to spend more time with family and pursue commercial and media opportunities, triggering a by-election. Bridges's finance and infrastructure spokesperson portfolios were filled by Nicola Willis and Chris Bishop, respectively. Bridges later revealed that his decision to retire was prompted by a life-threatening liver injury his son Harry received in December 2021. His retirement took effect on 6 May 2022.

== After Parliament ==
Bridges moved to Auckland in 2022, to become the CEO and spokesman for the Auckland Business Chamber, replacing Michael Barnett (the CEO for 31 years). He also has an arrangement with Stuff New Zealand involving an audio deal. His podcast Generally Famous launched in August 2022.

On 11 March 2024, Bridges was appointed a member and chairperson of the New Zealand Transport Agency Board for a three-year term.

== Personal life ==
Bridges grew up in a Christian household and has himself been a Christian since the age of 12 or 13. He met his future wife Natalie, a British-born public relations consultant, while she was studying at the University of Oxford. The couple have two sons, born in 2012 and 2014, and a daughter, born in 2017. The family lived in Matua, Tauranga. As of 2008 he attended Holy Trinity Tauranga, an Anglican church.

Bridges has a personal superannuation scheme, like 241 other New Zealanders (mainly MPs).

Bridges's sister, Rachel Trimble, married National MP Simon O'Connor in December 2016.

New Zealand Parliament
Preceded by Bob Clarkson	Member of Parliament for Tauranga; 2008–2022	Succeeded by Sam Uffindell
Political offices
Preceded by Gerry Brownlee	Minister of Transport; 2014–2017	Succeeded by Phil Twyford
Preceded by Gerry Brownlee	Leader of the House; 2017	Succeeded by Chris Hipkins
Preceded by Bill English	Leader of the Opposition; 2018–2020	Succeeded by Todd Muller
Party political offices
Preceded by Bill English	Leader of the National party 2018–2020	Succeeded by Todd Muller
