= Vanushi Walters =

New Zealand Labour Party politician

Vanushi Walters MP
- வனுசி வோல்ட்டர்ஸ்
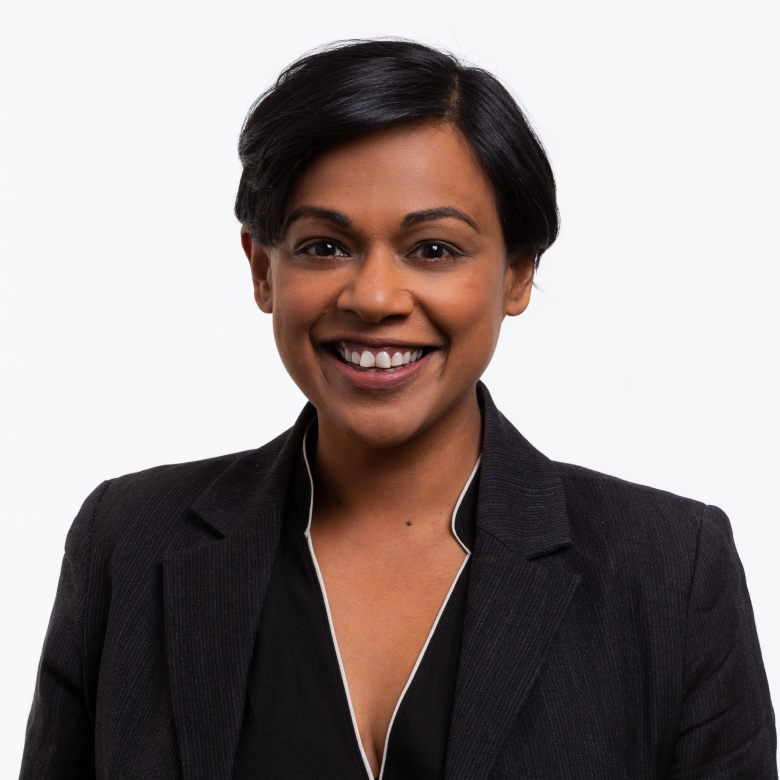
- Walters in 2023

Member of the New Zealand Parliament for Labour Party list
- Incumbent
- Assumed office 12 May 2025
- Preceded by: David Parker (Note: Normally, list MPs do not have individual predecessors or successors, but Parker resigned during a sitting parliament and therefore was succeeded by Walters.)

Member of the New Zealand Parliament for Upper Harbour
- In office 17 October 2020 – 14 October 2023
- Preceded by: Paula Bennett
- Succeeded by: Cameron Brewer

Personal details
- Born: Vanushi Sitanjali Rajanayagam; August 1981 (age 45) Sri Lanka
- Party: Labour
- Children: 3
- Education: University of Auckland; University of Oxford
- Profession: Lawyer

Vanushi Sitanjali Walters (née Rajanayagam; born August 1981) is a New Zealand lawyer and politician who served as Member of Parliament in the House of Representatives for the Labour Party representing the Upper Harbour electorate from 2020 to 2023. She returned to Parliament as a Labour list MP in May 2025, following the resignation of David Parker.

== Early life ==
Walters was born in August 1981 in Sri Lanka. She is the great-granddaughter of Ratnasothy Saravanamuttu, a member of the State Council of Ceylon and the first native Mayor of Colombo, and Naysum Saravanamuttu, Ceylon's second female MP. Her second cousin was the murdered Sri Lankan journalist and human rights activist Richard de Zoysa. At the age of five she moved to New Zealand, via Zambia and Scotland, with her parents Jana Rajanayagam and Prithiva Rajanayagam (née Mather).

Walters graduated with conjoint Bachelor of Arts and Bachelor of Laws (Honours) degrees from the University of Auckland in 2005, and earned a master's degree in international human rights law from the University of Oxford.

== Legal career ==
Walters is a human rights lawyer and has worked in private practice, the public sector and for non-profit and community organisations. She was general manager for YouthLaw Aotearoa and a member of Amnesty International's International Board. She was a senior manager at the Human Rights Commission and was a trustee of Foundation North.

== Member of Parliament ==
New Zealand Parliament
Years	Term	Electorate	List	Party
2020–2023	53rd	Upper Harbour	22	Labour
2025–2026	54th	List	30	Labour
2026–present	55th	Waitākere	8	Labour

At the 2020 election Walters stood for parliament for the Labour Party in the Upper Harbour electorate and was ranked 22nd on the party list. She won the seat over National candidate Jake Bezzant by a final margin of 2,392 votes. She became New Zealand's first Sri Lankan-born MP.

Walters delivered her maiden statement on 2 December 2020, announcing an intention to address racism, human rights injustices and climate change and listing Sir Bob Harvey, Chris Carter and Lecretia Seales as her mentors. During her first term in parliament she was deputy chair, and later chair, of the justice select committee. She led the New Zealand delegation to the 2023 International Parliamentary Union meetings in Bahrain, where she drafted an emergency resolution condemning Russia's invasion of Ukraine, and Rwanda.

At the 2023 election, Walters once again stood in Upper Harbour but was defeated by National's Cameron Brewer by 11,192 votes. Walter's list placement was also too low to make it into parliament, making her one of the 14 first-term Labour MPs to lose their seat at the election. Following David Parker's resignation, Walters returned to Parliament as a list MP on 12 May 2025. She is the Labour Party shadow attorney-general and associate spokesperson on foreign affairs, and a member of the justice select committee.

Following a portfolio reshuffle on 11 March 2026, Walters gained the foreign affairs, New Zealand Security Intelligence Service (NZSIS) and Government Communications Security Bureau (GCSB) portfolios.

During the 2026 New Zealand general election, Walters was ranked eighth on the Labour Party list. She contested the Waitākere electorate. Based on preliminary results, Walters came first place in the Waitākere contest, winning 13,480 votes.

== Personal life ==
Walters is married to Rhys Walters and has three sons. She lives in Titirangi, West Auckland.

== Notes ==
New Zealand Parliament
Preceded by Paula Bennett	Member of Parliament for Upper Harbour; 2020–2023	Succeeded by Cameron Brewer
