= 2018 New Zealand National Party leadership election =

2018 election to determine the 12th leader of the National Party

- 27 February 2018
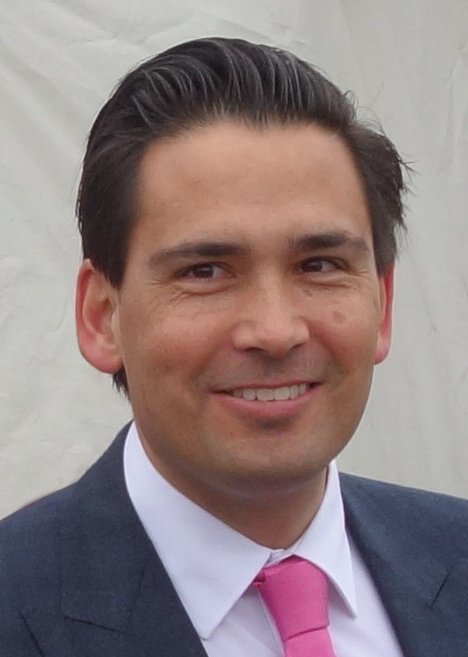

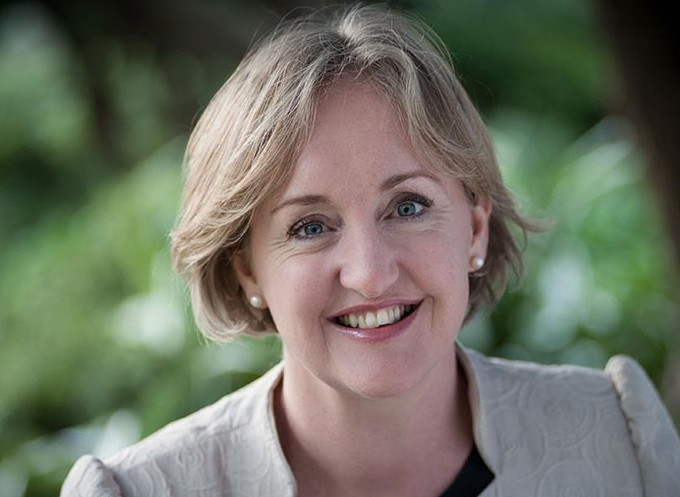

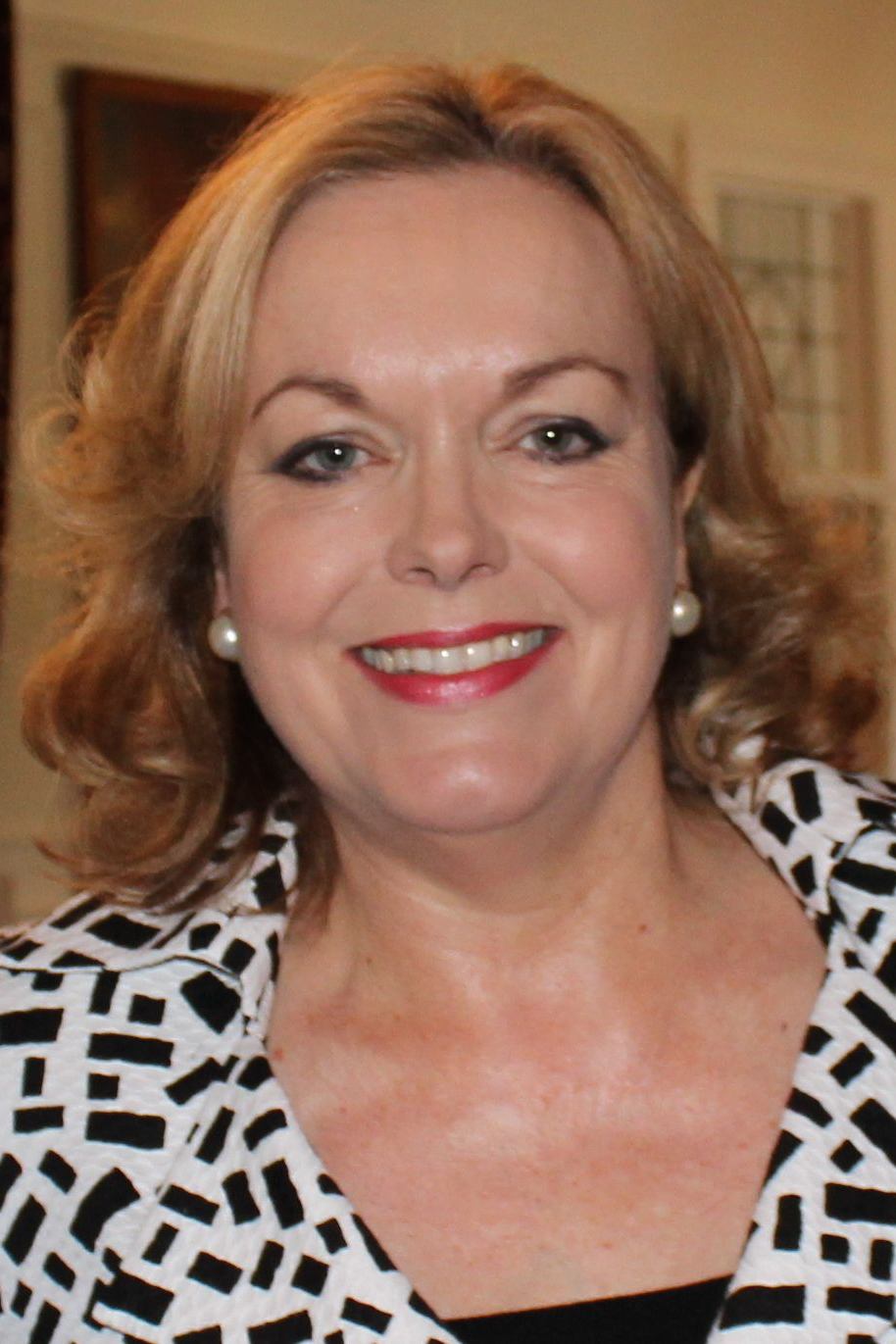

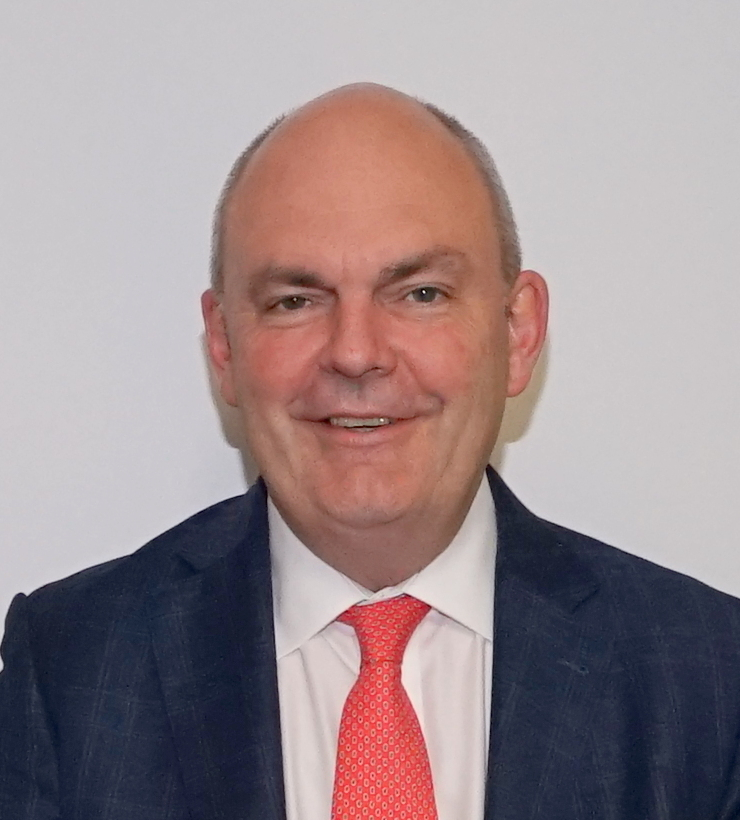
Candidate	Simon Bridges	Amy Adams
1st Rd.	Qualified to 2nd Rd.	Qualified to 2nd Rd.
2nd Rd.	≥29	<29
Candidate	Judith Collins	Steven Joyce
1st Rd.	Eliminated	Eliminated
Leader before election
Bill English
Leader after election
Simon Bridges

2018 New Zealand National Party deputy leadership election
- 27 February 2018
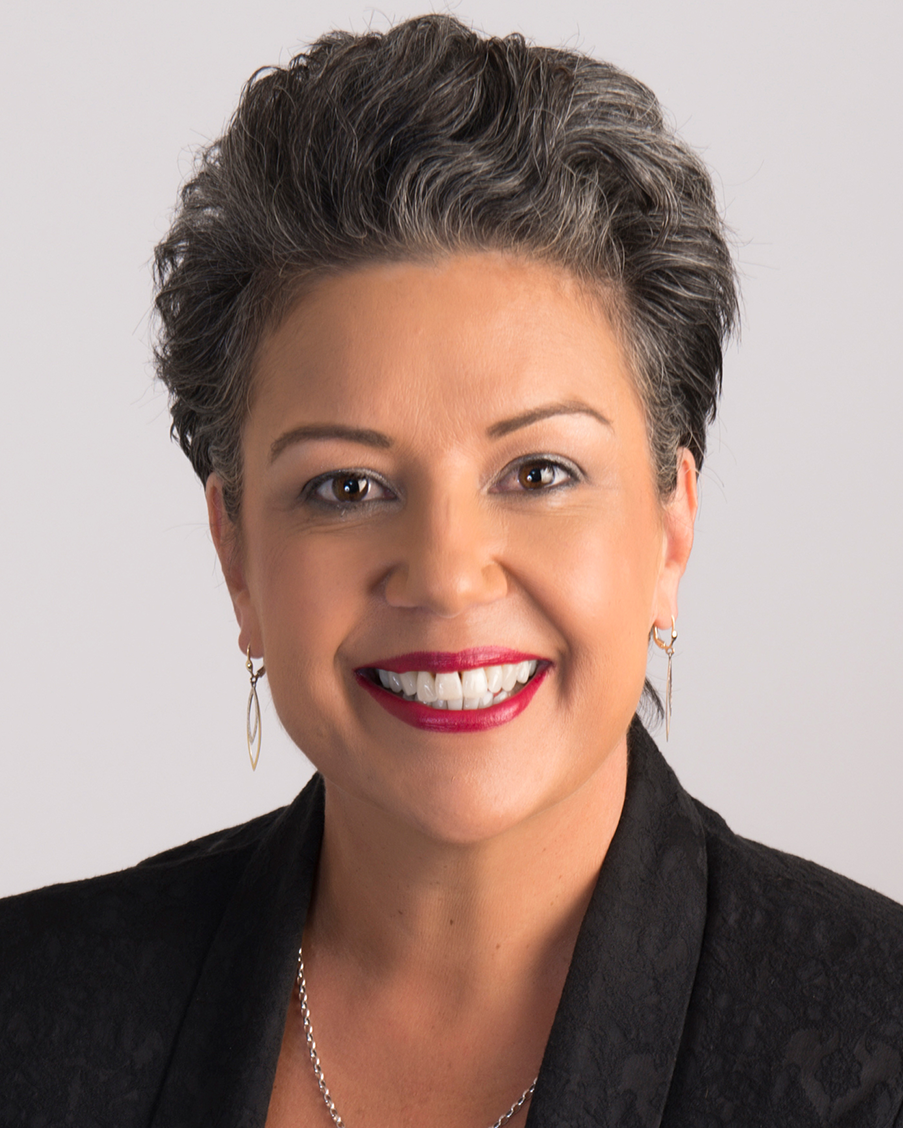

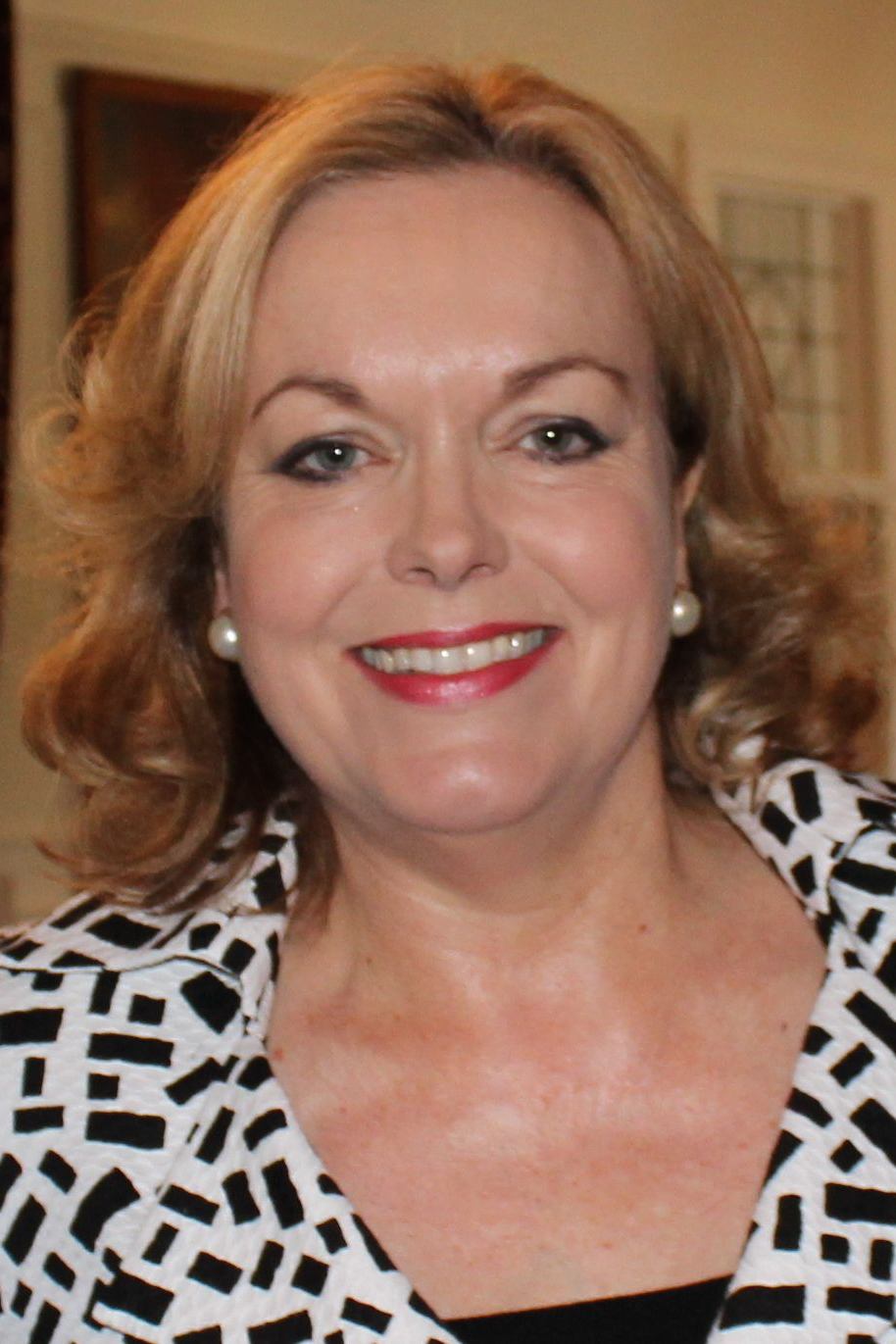
Candidate	Paula Bennett	Judith Collins
1st Rd.	≥29	≤29
Deputy Leader before election
Paula Bennett
Deputy Leader after election
Paula Bennett

The 2018 New Zealand National Party leadership election was held on 27 February 2018 to determine the 12th Leader of the National Party. On 13 February 2018, Bill English announced his resignation as leader of the National Party, effective on 27 February 2018. He left Parliament on 13 March 2018. On 20 February, Deputy Leader Paula Bennett announced that a concurrent deputy leadership election would take place, in which she would stand.

After a secret caucus ballot Simon Bridges was declared the new leader of the National Party and Paula Bennett was re-elected as deputy.

== Background ==
The Fifth National Government of New Zealand came to an end after the 2017 general election saw the National Party win 44% of the vote and Labour and New Zealand First form the minority Sixth Labour Government with confidence and supply from the Green Party. On 13 February 2018 Bill English, the leader of the National Party and Prime Minister from 2016 to 2017, announced his resignation as party leader effective on 27 February, and as a Member of Parliament effective on 13 March. Deputy leader Paula Bennett asked National senior whip Jami-Lee Ross for her role to also be put up for election, but she would run to keep the position. No other candidate declared an intention to run for the deputy leadership before 27 February.

== Candidates ==
=== Declared candidates ===
At the time of the election, the following individuals were candidates:

Name	Positions	Notes	Endorsements
Amy Adams	MP for Selwyn since 2008; Shadow Minister of Justice, Shadow Minister of Workplace Relations	Adams announced her candidacy on 14 February 2018.	National MPs: Maggie Barry; Chris Bishop; Nikki Kaye; Tim Macindoe; Media personalities: Kate Hawkesby, broadcaster – retracted on 20 February after Mark Mitchell announced his candidacy; Damian Light, political commentator, former United Future leader
Simon Bridges	MP for Tauranga since 2008; Shadow Leader of the House, Shadow Minister of Economic and Regional Development, Shadow Minister of Immigration	Bridges announced his candidacy on 14 February 2018.	Steve Braunias, The New Zealand Herald columnist; Liam Hehir, columnist and former National activist
Judith Collins	MP for Papakura since 2002; Shadow Minister of Transport, Shadow Minister of Revenue	Collins announced her candidacy on 14 February 2018.	Former political figures: Don Brash, former National Party leader and former Governor of the Reserve Bank; Mike Williams, former Labour Party president; Media personalities: Mike Hosking, broadcaster – retracted on 20 February after Steven Joyce announced his candidacy; Cameron Slater, blogger; Chris Trotter, commentator; Duncan Garner, broadcaster; Heather du Plessis-Allan, broadcaster; Barry Soper, broadcaster; Jane Bowron, broadcaster
Steven Joyce	List MP since 2008; Shadow Minister of Finance, Shadow Minister of Infrastructure	Joyce announced his candidacy on 20 February 2018.	Mike Hosking, broadcaster

=== Withdrew before vote ===
Name	Positions	Notes	Endorsements
Mark Mitchell	MP for Rodney since 2011; Shadow Minister of Defence	Mitchell announced his candidacy on 19 February 2018. He withdrew the morning of the caucus vote, either before or during the caucus meeting.	Kate Hawkesby, broadcaster

=== Declined ===
The following individuals were speculated as being possible leadership candidates, but ruled out a bid:

- Maggie Barry, MP for North Shore since 2011
- Paula Bennett, MP for Upper Harbour since 2014, Deputy Leader of the National Party
- Jonathan Coleman, MP for Northcote since 2005
- Nathan Guy, MP for Ōtaki since 2005
- Nikki Kaye, MP for Auckland Central since 2008
- Todd McClay, MP for Rotorua since 2008
- Todd Muller, MP for Bay of Plenty since 2014

== Public opinion polling ==
Date	Polling organisation	Sample size	Amy Adams	Paula Bennett	Simon Bridges	Jonathan Coleman	Judith Collins	Steven Joyce	Nikki Kaye	Mark Mitchell	Todd Muller	Unsure
30 Jan – 14 Feb 2018	UMR Research	1,000	8%	11%	8%	4%	12%	10%	12%	—	2%	34%
30 Jan – 14 Feb 2018	UMR Research	Nat.	9%	14%	9%	3%	17%	14%	11%	—	1%	19%
19–25 Feb 2018	UMR Research	600	13%	—N/a	11%	—N/a	21%	16%	—N/a	7%	—N/a	33%
19–25 Feb 2018	UMR Research	~230 Nat.	8%	—N/a	11%	—N/a	25%	23%	—N/a	7%	—N/a	26%

== Result ==
The election was conducted as a secret ballot of the National Party parliamentary caucus. An exhaustive ballot method was used, so that the support of 29 of the 56 MPs were required to elect the leader. Bridges was elected party leader after two rounds of voting. Bennett and Collins ran for the deputy leadership, and Bennett was re-elected to the position.

== Outcomes ==
On 6 March Joyce announced his retirement from politics following speculation he would lose the finance portfolio. Joyce wouldn't confirm or deny this but said Bridges offered him a "high-ranking" portfolio. On 11 March Bridges announced his shadow cabinet which saw Adams, Collins and Mitchell receive promotions; ranked 3rd, 4th and 7th respectively. Two weeks later, former leadership contender Jonathan Coleman resigned from Parliament; Adams announced her own upcoming retirement in early 2019.

Bridges held the leadership for two years, before being successfully challenged for the role by Todd Muller.

== See also ==
- 2018 Green Party of Aotearoa New Zealand female co-leadership election
- 52nd New Zealand Parliament
