= Paula Bennett =

Former New Zealand politician

The Honourable Paula Bennett
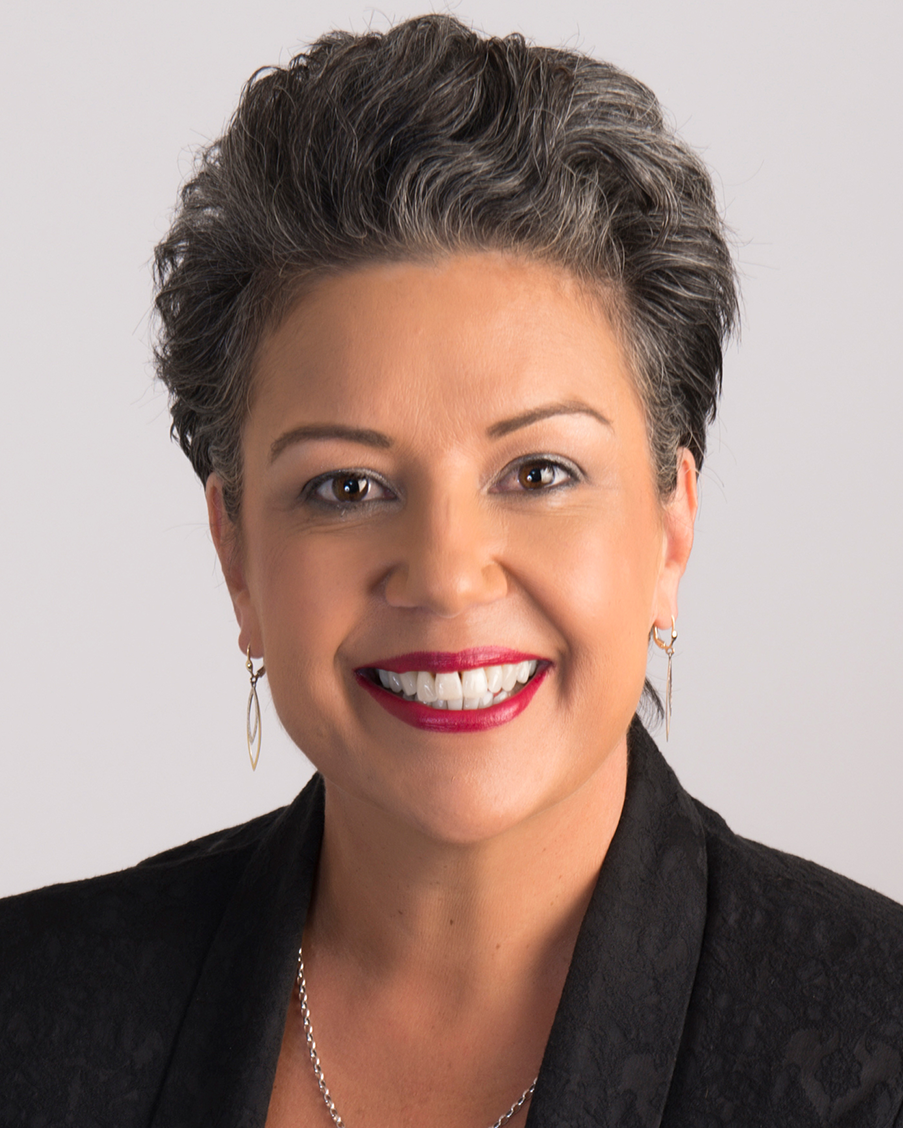
- Bennett in 2018

18th Deputy Prime Minister of New Zealand
- In office 12 December 2016 – 26 October 2017
- Monarch: Elizabeth II
- Prime Minister: Bill English
- Governor-General: Patsy Reddy
- Preceded by: Bill English
- Succeeded by: Winston Peters

Deputy Leader of the Opposition
- In office 26 October 2017 – 22 May 2020
- Prime Minister: Jacinda Ardern
- Leader: Bill English; Simon Bridges
- Preceded by: Kelvin Davis
- Succeeded by: Nikki Kaye

Deputy Leader of the National Party
- In office 12 December 2016 – 22 May 2020
- Leader: Bill English; Simon Bridges
- Preceded by: Bill English
- Succeeded by: Nikki Kaye

18th Minister of State Services
- In office 8 October 2014 – 26 October 2017
- Prime Minister: John Key; Bill English
- Preceded by: Jonathan Coleman
- Succeeded by: Chris Hipkins

14th Minister for Women
- In office 20 December 2016 – 26 October 2017
- Prime Minister: Bill English
- Preceded by: Louise Upston
- Succeeded by: Julie Anne Genter

35th Minister of Tourism
- In office 20 December 2016 – 26 October 2017
- Prime Minister: Bill English
- Preceded by: John Key
- Succeeded by: Kelvin Davis

38th Minister of Police
- In office 20 December 2016 – 26 October 2017
- Prime Minister: Bill English
- Preceded by: Judith Collins
- Succeeded by: Stuart Nash

5th Minister for Climate Change Issues
- In office 14 December 2015 – 26 October 2017
- Prime Minister: John Key; Bill English
- Preceded by: Tim Groser
- Succeeded by: James Shaw

Member of the New Zealand Parliament for Waitakere
- In office 8 December 2008 – 14 August 2014
- Preceded by: Lynne Pillay
- Succeeded by: constituency abolished
- Majority: 9

Member of the New Zealand Parliament for Upper Harbour
- In office 21 September 2014 – 17 October 2020
- Preceded by: constituency established
- Succeeded by: Vanushi Walters
- Majority: 9,692

Personal details
- Born: 9 April 1969 (age 57) Auckland, New Zealand
- Party: National Party
- Spouse: Alan Philps
- Children: 1
- Education: Massey University (BA)
- Occupation: Recruitment consultant

Paula Lee Bennett (born 9 April 1969) is a New Zealand former politician who served as the 18th deputy prime minister of New Zealand between December 2016 and October 2017. She served as the deputy leader of the National Party from 2016 to 2020 and as MP for Upper Harbour from 2014 to 2020.

Bennett previously represented the electorate of Waitakere, which was abolished prior to the 2014 general election. She held the Cabinet portfolios of State Services, Women, Tourism, Police, and Climate Change Issues in the fifth National Government until 2017. She retired from Parliament at the 2020 general election.

== Early life and career ==
Bennett was born on 9 April 1969 in Auckland, New Zealand, the daughter of Bob Bennett and Lee Bennett. She has Tainui ancestry through her Māori paternal grandmother, Ailsa Bennett. Her father had a flooring business in Auckland, then in 1974 bought the village store at Kinloch, near Taupō. Bennett attended Taupo-nui-a-Tia College in Taupō. At 17 she gave birth to a daughter, Ana, and raised her alone while working in hospitality and tourism-industry jobs or, at times, receiving the Domestic Purposes Benefit.

In 1992 Bennett moved to Auckland, where she worked in a rest home, first as a kitchenhand and then as a nurse aide. She began studying social work at the Albany campus of Massey University in 1994. She became the welfare officer of the Massey University at Albany Students' Association, then, in 1996, the president, which she said gave her a taste for politics. She discontinued the social work component of her course of study, leaving simply social policy, and graduated with a Bachelor of Arts.

After graduating, Bennett worked as an electorate secretary for Murray McCully, National Party member of Parliament for East Coast Bays, until the 1999 general election. She then worked as a recruitment consultant for several years and assisted McCully in the 2002 general election campaign.

== Political career ==
New Zealand Parliament
Years	Term	Electorate	List	Party
2005–2008	48th	List	45	National
2008–2011	49th	Waitakere	41	National
2011–2014	50th	Waitakere	14	National
2014–2017	51st	Upper Harbour	9	National
2017–2020	52nd	Upper Harbour	2	National

=== Fifth Labour Government, 2005–2008 ===
In the 2005 general election Bennett stood as the National Party candidate for the Waitakere seat, with a ranking of 45th on National's party list. She failed to win Waitakere, but entered Parliament as a list MP. National did not have sufficient parliamentary support to form a government.

In opposition, Bennett was appointed National's associate spokesperson for welfare and liaison to the community and voluntary sector under Don Brash from 2005 to 2006 and associate spokesperson for education (early childhood education) under John Key from 2006 to 2008.

In the 2008 election, she unseated Waitakere MP Lynne Pillay, winning the seat with a majority of 632. Bennett was appointed to several cabinet roles in the new National-led government.

=== Fifth National Government, 2008–2017 ===
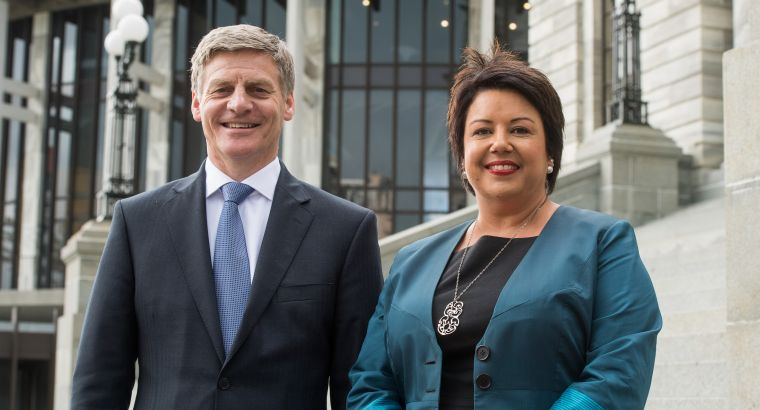
Bennett as Deputy Prime Minister, with Prime Minister Bill English, 2016

As a senior minister in the Fifth National Government, Bennett was best known for leading social welfare reforms as Minister of Social Development from 2008 to 2014. During that time she was also Minister of Youth Affairs (2008–2013), Minister for Disability Issues (2008–2009), and Associate Minister of Housing (2013–14). In the government's third term, she was Minister of State Services (2014–2017), Minister of Social Housing (2014–2016), Associate Minister of Finance (2014–2016), Minister of Local Government (2014–2015) and Minister for Climate Change Issues (2015–2017) before becoming Deputy Prime Minister, Minister for Women, Minister of Police, and Minister of Tourism (2016–2017).

Bennett's appointment as Minister of Social Development and Employment after the 2008 election was regarded by some commentators as a "surprise." She had been ranked at 41st on the party list prior to the election and the social development portfolio had previously been held by senior MP Judith Collins. It was expected that Bennett's background as a former beneficiary would give the portfolio a "softer face" than under Collins, who was instead appointed Minister of Police and Minister of Corrections.

Bennett faced criticism in enacting welfare reform during her first and second terms in government, especially around her previous use of government support programs. Scrutiny came from both members of parliament and from people on government incomes. In particular, the Training Incentive Allowance (TIA) was abolished under her leadership, after she had received this allowance herself as a student, and the requirement for single parents in receipt of the domestic purposes benefit was changed, with beneficiaries having to look for part-time work when their child turned six instead of eighteen. Bennett had her first child at 17 and was at times on a domestic purposes benefit. In response to criticisms, Bennett said that times were different 25 years later, and that beneficiaries get more (in 2012) than they did when she was in similar need.

In the 2011 election, Bennett again stood for the Waitakere seat, and secured an election night majority of 349 votes. After the routine counting of special votes 10 days later, the result had swung towards Labour candidate Carmel Sepuloni. Bennett was subsequently declared the winner after a judicial recount. Carmel Sepuloni was not placed high enough on Labour's list to remain an MP and was ousted from Parliament as a result of her loss.

The 2013/14 electoral boundary review saw Bennett's Waitakere electorate abolished in favour of two new electorates in western Auckland, Kelston and Upper Harbour. At the 2014 election, Bennett stood for the Upper Harbour seat and won with a majority of 9,692 votes.

National won a third term of government in 2014. Prime Minister John Key suggested prior to the announcement of the new Cabinet that Bennett would leave the social development portfolio and instead be given a financial or economic role. Bennett was eventually announced as the highest-ranking female Cabinet minister, holding the State Services, Social Housing, and Local Government portfolios. She was also Associate Minister of Finance and Associate Minister of Tourism. From December 2015, she became Minister for Climate Change Issues.

John Key resigned the leadership of the National Party in December 2016. He was succeeded as prime minister by Bill English. Bennett was appointed National's deputy leader and sworn in as deputy prime minister on 12 December 2016. She held this role, as well as the State Services, Women, Tourism, Police and Climate Change Issues Cabinet portfolios, for the remainder of the term of government.

During the 2017 election, Bennett contested the Upper Harbour seat for a second time and was re-elected with a majority of 9,556 votes.

=== Sixth Labour Government, 2017–2020 ===
National did not have sufficient parliamentary support to continue in government after the 2017 election. Bennett continued as National's deputy leader under Simon Bridges after Bill English retired in 2018 and was the party's spokesperson for social investment and social services, women and drug reform. Bennett has argued that the government's drug reform policy needs to consider health, education, and justice.

In mid-August 2019, Bennett announced her intention not to contest Upper Harbour in 2020 and run as a list-only candidate. She was also named as National's 2020 election campaign manager.

While Parliament was adjourned in the first year of the COVID-19 pandemic, Bennett was a member of the Epidemic Response Committee, a select committee that considers the government's response to the pandemic.

Following a Newshub-Reid research poll released on 18 May 2020 which returned a low approval rating for the National Party and its leader Simon Bridges, Bennett as deputy leader was challenged by Auckland Central MP Nikki Kaye. Bridges' leadership of National was contested by Bay of Plenty MP Todd Muller. A leadership vote was held during an emergency National Party caucus on 22 May, in which Bridges and Bennett were defeated by Muller and Kaye, who assumed the positions of leader and deputy leaders of the party.

Bennett was subsequently ranked at 13 in Muller's Shadow Cabinet, and on 29 June she announced that she would retire from politics at the general election in September. On 2 July, Bennett's former Women and Drug Reform portfolios were assumed by Nikki Kaye and Amy Adams respectively.

== Post-political career ==
On 19 October 2020, after the general election, Bennett joined Bayleys Real Estate as Director - Strategic Advisory. In 2021 she was asked to host the TVNZ revival of British game show Give Us a Clue.

In 2024, Associate Minister of Health David Seymour appointed Bennett as chair of Pharmac.

== Controversies ==
=== Release of private information about beneficiaries ===
As Social Development Minister, Bennett had been criticised by opponents for a "hardline" approach to benefit policies. When Bennett revealed that solo mothers could take home more than $1000 per week in government support, two women, Natasha Fuller and Jennifer Johnston, came forward to reveal parts of their own benefit allowances, and criticised the Government's policy of abolishing the Training Initiative Allowance (TIA). In response, Bennett released full details of the two women's benefits.

When challenged by opposition parties and the media on this revelation of private details, Bennett said she believed she had "implied consent" for the release of the information based on the women releasing their own details. The Green Party labeled the act as "beneficiary bashing", while Labour's social welfare spokesperson Annette King likened it to Robert Muldoon's government, when anyone speaking out against government policy "was hit over the head with a political sledge hammer." Labour MP Charles Chauvel said he would lay a complaint on behalf of the women, and Fuller said she would proceed with a complaint.

Bennett apologised to Johnston personally for the public reaction to the figures, but not for releasing the women's details, and after talking to Johnston said she would investigate the idea raised by Johnston for a larger loan for solo parents to cover study costs. Johnston also apologised to Bennett, telling the media "I was pretty angry yesterday. I don't bear her any ill will." Johnston also said that the privacy breach was of little concern, suggesting that it was not hard to find out what sort of benefits a woman in her position would be eligible for. Fuller rejected the offer to talk with Bennett.

The Privacy Commissioner investigated Bennett's actions after receiving a complaint from Fuller, and later referred the matter to the Director of Human Rights Proceedings for the Human Rights Commission. In August 2012, the director announced the resolution of the complaint, saying, "On the basis of the Minister’s letter to me, I have agreed to close my file. The matter has been resolved to the satisfaction of all parties."

When TV3 News reported in April 2010 that Bennett had paid Fuller to settle the privacy dispute, both parties rejected this claim. Later, after the Human Rights Commission's resolution in 2012, answering an OIA request, Bennett gave the same response, stating "I made no private settlement with Ms Fuller as I do not accept that I breached her privacy."

=== Christine Rankin appointment ===
In May 2009, Bennett appointed the controversial Christine Rankin as Families Commissioner; her term ended in 2013.

=== Job numbers claims ===
In November 2012, a week after unemployment was reported at 7.3 percent – a 13-year high – Bennett read out job listings in Parliament, claiming there were "300 jobs" available at retailer The Warehouse, if anyone wanted them, as well as 40 jobs at retailer Bunnings. The Warehouse refuted this claim, saying it only had 30 jobs available, and Bunnings only had three advertised.

=== Gun control ===
In October 2017, prior to the Christchurch mosque shootings, Bennett rejected 12 of 20 recommendations from a select committee inquiry into the illegal possession of firearms. This decision was criticised at the time by New Zealand's Police Association president Chris Cahill who lamented to news website Stuff that "the opportunity was missed and you know what it's going to take to bring it on the table again, and unfortunately that's a tragedy."

== Personal life ==
Bennett married Alan Philps in 2012. Philps keeps a low public profile and was mentioned by Bennett in October 2016. Philps did not appear in photographs from Bennett's swearing-in ceremony at Government House, Wellington, on 12 December 2016, but her daughter, granddaughter and stepdaughter did. After her announced retirement at the New Zealand 2020 general election, Bennett says she plans to venture into the business world.

In late 2017 Bennett announced she had undergone gastric bypass surgery for weight loss. In November 2018 she stated she had lost 50 kilograms (110 lb) over the previous year.

== Public image ==
For several years Bennett appeared on TV One's Breakfast with friend and Labour MP Darren Hughes.

In January 2009, Bennett broke up a fight between 30 teenagers at her local shopping mall in Henderson before police arrived, earning praise as a "tough lady." She also arranged community networking to address the underlying issues.

In March 2010, Bennett accepted an Eisenhower Fellowship. The prestigious six week fellowship in the United States was awarded to only 20 women around the world who were identified as outstanding leaders.

In November 2020 she was named one of the best dressed women on David Hartnell MNZM's Best Dressed List.

New Zealand Parliament
Preceded by Lynne Pillay	Member of Parliament for Waitakere; 2008–2014	Constituency abolished
New constituency	Member of Parliament for Upper Harbour; 2014–2020	Succeeded by Vanushi Walters
Party political offices
Preceded by Bill English	Deputy Leader of the National Party; 2016–2020	Succeeded by Nikki Kaye
Political offices
Preceded by Ruth Dyson	Minister for Disability Issues; 2008–2009	Succeeded by Tariana Turia
Preceded by Ruth Dyson	Minister of Social Development and Employment; 2008–2014	Succeeded by Anne Tolley
Preceded by Nanaia Mahuta	Minister for Youth Affairs; 2008–2013	Succeeded by Nikki Kaye
Preceded by Chris Tremain	Minister of Local Government; 2014–2016	Succeeded by Anne Tolley
Preceded by Jonathan Coleman	Minister of State Services; 2014–2017	Succeeded by Chris Hipkins
Preceded by Tim Groser	Minister for Climate Change Issues; 2015–2017	Succeeded by James Shaw
Preceded by Bill English	Deputy Prime Minister of New Zealand; 2016–2017	Succeeded by Winston Peters
Preceded by Louise Upston	Minister for Women; 2016–2017	Succeeded by Julie Anne Genter
Preceded by John Key	Minister of Tourism; 2016–2017	Succeeded by Kelvin Davis
Preceded by Judith Collins	Minister of Police; 2016–2017	Succeeded by Stuart Nash
Preceded by Kelvin Davis	Deputy Leader of the Opposition; 2017–2020	Succeeded by Nikki Kaye
