= Bob Clarkson =

New Zealand politician

Robert Moncrieff Clarkson CNZM (born 1939 in Gisborne) is a former Member of the New Zealand Parliament. He was the National Party MP for Tauranga from 2005 to 2008.

== Early life and family ==
Clarkson was raised in Kaiti, near Gisborne, on his parents' dairy farm. He attended Gisborne Boys' High School but left at age 15 with no qualifications. In 1958, Clarkson qualified as a fitter and turner in Gisborne. He then moved to the Waikato and worked on the Kaimai Tunnel. He began selling and servicing tractors in Matamata before deciding to import V8 motors from the United States, a business he continued for nine years. Clarkson then moved into commercial building construction.

Clarkson played field hockey for the Poverty Bay provincial team. He was selected as a standby goalkeeper for the New Zealand team that won gold at the 1976 Summer Olympics. He was also a member of the New Zealand stock car racing team from 1968 to 1971, and won seven New Zealand titles in dragster racing between 1972 and 1975.

Clarkson has two daughters from his first marriage.

== Member of Parliament ==
New Zealand Parliament
Years	Term	Electorate	List	Party
2005–2008	48th	Tauranga	49	National

A long-time member of the National Party, Clarkson was recruited to be National's Tauranga candidate at the 2005 general election by East Coast MP Tony Ryall. He challenged Winston Peters, leader of the New Zealand First party, who had held the seat for twenty-one years. The contest was of national significance as a party must win 5% of the vote or an electorate seat to qualify for proportional representation in parliament. A loss by Peters could have deprived New Zealand First of its electorate seat, leaving it vulnerable to a decline in its vote.

Clarkson won the seat by 730 votes, a 2.02% majority over Winston Peters. However, New Zealand First retained representation by achieving 5.72% of the vote.

As a member of parliament, Clarkson was the National Party's associate spokesperson for Building and Construction and Housing. He held socially conservative views and did not support the civil union legislation that gave legal recognition to same-sex partnerships or adoption by same-sex couples.

=== Controversies ===
==== Sexual harassment allegation: "left testicle" ====
During the campaign sexual harassment allegations were made against Clarkson by a former employee. Clarkson claimed the allegations were the result of a misunderstanding arising from a mention of his left testicle to a colleague. It was claimed Clarkson repeatedly made jokes, such as "I bet my left testicle the all blacks will win" to female employees. Clarkson, in the heat of the controversy, grabbed and talked about his crotch to a female reporter.

==== Campaign overspending petition ====
Winston Peters filed a petition in the High Court of New Zealand alleging that Clarkson had spent more on campaigning than is allowed under the Electoral Act 1993. The Act prescribes a campaign spending limit of $20,000 per local candidate. Peters alleged that Clarkson had spent more than $100,000. However the High Court found that Clarkson had only spent $18,159. The court ordered Peters to pay $40,000 in legal costs to Bob Clarkson.

==== Controversy over minority groups ====
In several interviews, Clarkson made a number of comments which caused offense to Muslim and homosexual groups. He was reported as saying that Muslim women wearing burqas, who did not want to fit in should "go back to Islam or Iraq" and that burqas should not be worn in banks or courts. Clarkson also made reference to the number of gay and lesbian Members of Parliament (MPs) in the New Zealand Labour Party and was quoted as saying "We've got a problem there they are employing more of those than average people." The National Party MP caused further controversy after comparing homosexuality to nose picking, saying that "If you walk up and down the street picking your nose, you're a bit different, aren't you? You're going to offend somebody." Clarkson was also reported as saying he had nothing against gays and lesbians unless they tried to "ram it down" his throat.

==== Folole Muliaga ====
Clarkson during a parliamentary debate on an electricity regulation to protect vulnerable customers yelled out "pay your bill" several times while the case of Folole Muliaga was being discussed. Muliaga died after her electricity was cut because she could not afford to pay the overdue bill. When asked to apologise in parliament after offence was taken by another member to the interjection, Clarkson left the House after refusing to apologise. Clarkson said: "Sorry that's his problem." Clarkson was reprimanded for the comments after John Key said the comments were "distasteful."

=== Stepping down from Parliament ===
In May 2008 it was announced Clarkson would not stand for re-election. He did not deliver a valedictory speech before he left Parliament on 25 September 2008. In 2011 he announced he was leaving the National Party and joining ACT New Zealand, although he did not stand as a candidate for that party.

== Honours and awards ==
Clarkson was appointed a Companion of the New Zealand Order of Merit, for services to philanthropy, in the 2003 New Year Honours.

New Zealand Parliament
Preceded by Winston Peters	Member of Parliament for Tauranga; 2005–2008	Succeeded by Simon Bridges
