= Upper Harbour (New Zealand electorate) =

- Single-member general constituency for the New Zealand House of Representatives
- Interactive map of boundaries from the 2026 election
- Formation: 2014
- Region: Auckland
- Character: Suburban
- Term: 3 years

Member for Upper Harbour
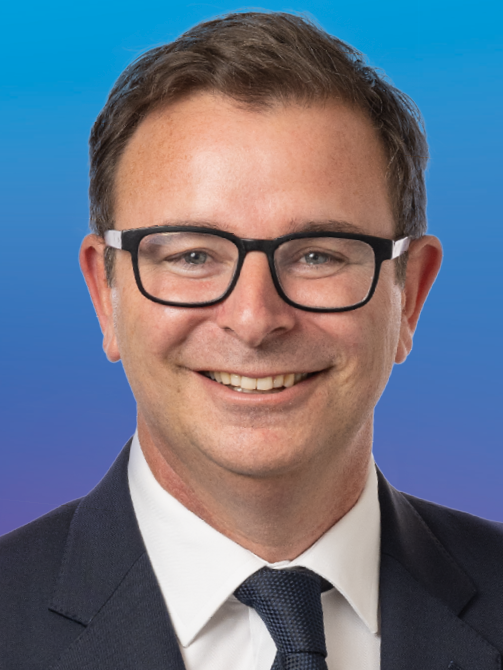
- Cameron Brewer since 14 October 2023
- Party: National
- List MPs: Karen Chhour (ACT)
- Previous MP: Vanushi Walters (Labour)
Party vote distribution

Upper Harbour is a parliamentary electorate in Auckland that returns one member to the New Zealand House of Representatives. It was first formed for the 2014 election. The seat was won by National's Paula Bennett in both the 2014 and 2017 election. The seat was then held by Labour's Vanushi Walters in the 2020 election. The seat is currently held by National's Cameron Brewer since the 2023 general election.

== Geography ==
Upper Harbour covers the northwestern reaches of Waitematā Harbour. It stretches from Massey, in West Auckland, through West Harbour and Hobsonville, and across to Greenhithe and on to Glenfield and Unsworth Heights on the North Shore.

== History ==
Upper Harbour was proposed in the 2013/14 electorate boundary review and confirmed by the Electoral Commission on 17 April 2014. The 2013 census showed that the Auckland region had seen faster population growth than other areas, so needed an extra electorate to keep all electorates within five percent of their quota. To achieve this, the Electoral Commission abolished Waitakere and established two new electorates, Upper Harbour and Kelston.

When the draft changes to electorate boundaries were first announced, the incumbent of the Waitakere electorate, Paula Bennett, was quick to announce that she would stand in Upper Harbour instead. This was to prevent Colin Craig of the Conservative Party making a claim for the electorate, as at the time, there was speculation whether the National Party would make a deal with the Conservatives for a safe seat in line with the agreement with ACT New Zealand in the Epsom electorate. Bennett won the 2014 election with a majority of nearly 10,000 votes over Labour's Hermann Retzlaff.

Map of boundaries at the 2020 and 2023 general elections

A small portion of the electorate around Tihema Stream was moved to the new electorate of Kaipara ki Mahurangi in the 2020 redistribution. At the 2020 election, Bennett retired and Labour's Vanushi Walters won the seat against National’s Jake Bezzant. This was one of fifteen electorates that Labour took from National in an election that dramatically changed the composition of New Zealand’s parliament.

The 2025 Boundary Review saw Upper Harbour shifted northwards to accommodate population changes in northern Auckland, gaining the suburbs of Whenuapai and Westgate from Kaipara ki Mahurangi and Schnapper Rock from East Coast Bays, and losing Massey and Wairau Valley to Henderson and Northcote respectively.

== Members of Parliament ==
Unless otherwise stated, all MPs' terms began and ended at general elections.

Key National Labour

Election	Winner
2014 election	Paula Bennett
2017 election	Paula Bennett
2020 election	Vanushi Walters
2023 election	Cameron Brewer

=== List MPs ===
Members of Parliament elected from party lists in elections where that person also unsuccessfully contested the Upper Harbour electorate. Unless otherwise stated, all MPs' terms began and ended at general elections.

Key ACT

Election	Winner
2020 election	Karen Chhour
2023 election	Karen Chhour
2025 (Note: Walters became a list MP in May 2025, while Wilson became a list MP in June 2025.)	Vanushi Walters
2025	David Wilson

== Election results ==
=== 2026 election ===
The next election will be held on 7 November 2026. Candidates for Upper Harbour are listed at Candidates in the 2026 New Zealand general election by electorate § Upper Harbour. Official results will be available after 27 November 2026.

=== 2023 election ===
2023 general election: Upper Harbour
Notes:	Blue background denotes the winner of the electorate vote. Pink background denotes a candidate elected from their party list. Yellow background denotes an electorate win by a list member, or other incumbent. A ✓ or ✗ denotes status of any incumbent, win or lose respectively.						
Party	Candidate	Votes	%	±%	Party votes	%	±%
National	Cameron Brewer	21,498	52.73	+15.03	20,689	49.94	+18.77
Labour	✗ Vanushi Walters	10,306	25.28	–18.36	9,314	22.48	–25.49
Green	Thea Doyle	3,018	7.40	+1.23	4,872	9.34	+4.05
ACT	Karen Chhour	2,313	5.67	+1.42	3,483	8.40	0.86
NZ First	David Wilson	1,330	3.26	–	1,671	4.03	+2.07
Opportunities	Shai Navot	1,109	2.72	–	884	2.13	+0.76
NZ Loyal	Chris Newman	387	0.94	–	275	0.66	–
Vision NZ	Bernadette Soares	137	0.33	–			
Sovereignty	Tony Corbett	83	0.20	–			
Te Pāti Māori					328	0.79	+0.44
NewZeal					207	0.49	+0.30
Legalise Cannabis					141	0.34	–0.04
New Conservatives					93	0.22	–1.62
Freedoms NZ					92	0.22	–
Animal Justice					48	0.11	–
DemocracyNZ					33	0.07	–
Women's Rights					31	0.07	–
Leighton Baker Party					12	0.02	–
New Nation					4	0.00	–
Informal votes		586			248		
Total valid votes		40,767			41,425		
National gain from Labour	Majority	11,192	27.45	+21.51			

=== 2020 election ===
2020 general election: Upper Harbour
Notes:	Blue background denotes the winner of the electorate vote. Pink background denotes a candidate elected from their party list. Yellow background denotes an electorate win by a list member, or other incumbent. A ✓ or ✗ denotes status of any incumbent, win or lose respectively.						
Party	Candidate	Votes	%	±%	Party votes	%	±%
Labour	Vanushi Walters	17,573	43.64	+14.89	19,507	47.97	+15.66
National	Jake Bezzant	15,181	37.70	−17.73	12,675	31.17	−22.86
Green	Ryan Nicholls	2,488	6.17	−1.33	2,151	5.29	+1.22
ACT	Karen Chhour	1,712	4.25	+3.25	3,066	7.54	+6.87
New Conservative	Bernadette Soares	1,265	3.14	—	752	1.84	+1.45
TEA	Winson Tan	410	1.01	—	136	0.33	—
Advance NZ	Peter Vaughan	309	0.76	—	256	0.62	—
Outdoors	Catherine Giorza	157	0.38	—	22	0.05	+0.02
Sustainable NZ	Dion Thomas	127	0.31	—	46	0.11	—
NZ First					797	1.96	−3.77
Opportunities					559	1.37	−0.27
Legalise Cannabis					157	0.38	+0.14
Māori Party					144	0.35	+0.04
ONE					81	0.19	—
Vision NZ					20	0.04	—
Social Credit					5	0.01	−0.01
Heartland					5	0.01	—
Informal votes		1,042			281		
Total valid votes		40,264			40,660		
Turnout		40,660					
Labour gain from National	Majority	2,392	5.94	−20.73			

=== 2017 election ===
2017 general election: Upper Harbour
Notes:	Blue background denotes the winner of the electorate vote. Pink background denotes a candidate elected from their party list. Yellow background denotes an electorate win by a list member, or other incumbent. A ✓ or ✗ denotes status of any incumbent, win or lose respectively.						
Party	Candidate	Votes	%	±%	Party votes	%	±%
National	✓ Paula Bennett	19,857	55.43	−0.52	19,722	54.03	−0.22
Labour	Jin An	10,301	28.75	+2.41	11,793	32.31	+8.95
Green	James Goodhue	2,688	7.5	−0.5	1,484	4.07	−2.9
NZ First	Jane Johnston	2,192	6.12	—	2,092	5.73	−1.18
ACT	Bruce Haycock	358	1	−0.67	246	0.67	−0.76
Opportunities					597	1.64	—
Conservative					144	0.39	−4.43
Māori Party					112	0.31	−0.44
Legalise Cannabis					88	0.24	−0.14
People's Party					25	0.07	—
Mana					24	0.07	−0.78 (Note: 2017 Mana Party swing is relative to the votes for Internet-Mana in 2014; it shared a party list with the Internet Party in the 2014 election)
United Future					21	0.06	−0.14
Internet					14	0.04	−0.81 (Note: 2017 Internet Party swing is relative to the votes for Internet-Mana in 2014; it shared a party list with Mana Party in the 2014 election)
Outdoors					11	0.03	—
Ban 1080					9	0.02	−0.01
Democrats					6	0.02	+0.01
Informal votes		429			114		
Total valid votes		35,825			36,502		
National hold	Majority	9,556	26.67	−2.94			

=== 2014 election ===
2014 general election: Upper Harbour
Notes:	Blue background denotes the winner of the electorate vote. Pink background denotes a candidate elected from their party list. Yellow background denotes an electorate win by a list member, or other incumbent. A ✓ or ✗ denotes status of any incumbent, win or lose respectively.						
Party	Candidate	Votes	%	±%	Party votes	%	±%
National	✓ Paula Bennett	18,315	55.95	—	20,853	54.25	—
Labour	Hermann Retzlaff	8,623	26.34	—	4,965	23.36	—
Green	Nicholas Mayne	2,619	8.00	—	2,329	6.97	—
Conservative	Callum Blair	1,839	5.61	—	1,613	4.82	—
ACT	Stephen Berry	549	1.67	—	450	1.34	—
Māori Party	Hinurewa Te Hau	246	0.75	—	119	0.35	—
Mana Party	Makelesi Ngata	204	0.62	—			
NZ First					2,311	6.91	—
Internet Mana					432	0.85	—
Legalise Cannabis					129	0.38	—
United Future					69	0.20	—
Civilian					14	0.04	—
Ban 1080					13	0.03	—
Independent Coalition					7	0.02	—
Focus					4	0.01	—
Democrats					4	0.01	—
Informal votes		338			130		
Total valid votes		32,733			33,403		
Turnout		33,420	73.42	—			
National win new seat	Majority	9,692	29.61				
