= Candidates in the 2011 New Zealand general election by electorate =

New Zealand political candidates in the MMP era
Year	Party list	Candidates
1996	party lists	by electorate
1999	party lists	by electorate
2002	party lists	by electorate
2005	party lists	by electorate
2008	party lists	by electorate
2011	party lists	by electorate
2014	party lists	by electorate
2017	party lists	by electorate
2020	party lists	by electorate
2023	party lists	by electorate
2026	party lists	by electorate

Seventy members of the New Zealand House of Representatives elected in the 2011 general election were from single member constituencies, the same number as in 2008. The initial composition of the 2008 Parliament gave the National Party 41 seats, the Labour Party 21, the Māori Party five and ACT, United Future and the Progressive Party one each.

The election was held on 26 November 2011. Nominations officially opened on 27 October, and the deadline for nominations was 12:00 noon on 1 November.

== General electorates ==
=== Auckland Central ===
2011 general election: Auckland Central
Notes:	Blue background denotes an incumbent. Pink background denotes a current list MP. Yellow background denotes a retiring MP.			
Party	Candidate	Notes	List #	Source
Labour	Jacinda Ardern	List since 2008. Returned as list MP	13	
NZ First	Allen Davies		33	
Conservative	Stephen Greenfield			
National	Nikki Kaye	Incumbent since 2008. Re-elected to 2nd term.	33	
Green	Denise Roche	Contested electorate in 2008. Elected as list MP.	11	
ACT	David Seymour		5	
Human Rights Party	Anthony van den Heuvel			
Independent	Liz Shaw	Candidate withdrew via her campaign facebook page (deleted).		
Pirate	Noel Zeng	Announced, but not on final candidate list.		

Electorate (as at 21 October 2011): 42,994

=== Bay of Plenty ===
2011 general election: Bay of Plenty
Notes:	Blue background denotes an incumbent. Pink background denotes a current list MP. Yellow background denotes a retiring MP.			
Party	Candidate	Notes	List #	Source
United Future New Zealand	Brian Carter		15	
Labour	Carol Devoy-Heena		68	
NZ First	Raymond Dolman		18	
Conservative	Peter Redman			
National	Tony Ryall	Incumbent since 1990	5	
Mana	Sharon Stevens		13	

Electorate (as at 21 October 2011): 46,546

=== Botany ===
2011 general election: Botany
Notes:	Blue background denotes an incumbent. Pink background denotes a current list MP. Yellow background denotes a retiring MP.			
Party	Candidate	Notes	List #	Source
ACT	Lyn Murphy		12	
United Future New Zealand	Ram Parkash		9	
National	Jami-Lee Ross	Incumbent since 2011 by-election	54	
Labour	Chao-Fu Wu		70	
Conservative	Paul Young		11	

Electorate (as at 21 October 2011): 43,204

=== Christchurch Central ===
2011 general election: Christchurch Central
Notes:	Blue background denotes an incumbent. Pink background denotes a current list MP. Yellow background denotes a retiring MP.			
Party	Candidate	Notes	List #	Source
Labour	Brendon Burns	Incumbent since 2008	29	
Independent	Luke Chandler			
Conservative	Michael Cooke		30	
Green	David Moorhouse		52	
ACT	Toni Severin		17	
National	Nicky Wagner	List MP since 2005	42	

Electorate (as at 11 November 2011): 38,775

=== Christchurch East ===
2011 general election: Christchurch East
Notes:	Blue background denotes an incumbent. Pink background denotes a current list MP. Yellow background denotes a retiring MP.			
Party	Candidate	Notes	List #	Source
Conservative	Leighton Baker		12	
Legalise Cannabis	Michael Britnell		2	
Labour	Lianne Dalziel	Incumbent since 1999; MP since 1990	None	
National	Aaron Gilmore	List MP since 2008	53	
Green	Mojo Mathers		14	
United Future New Zealand	Johnny Miller		16	

Electorate (as at 11 November 2011): 39,605

=== Clutha-Southland ===
2011 general election: Clutha-Southland
Notes:	Blue background denotes an incumbent. Pink background denotes a current list MP. Yellow background denotes a retiring MP.			
Party	Candidate	Notes	List #	Source
Conservative	Ross Calverley	Initially announced as an OurNZ candidate in Waitaki.		
Sovereignty	Tony Corbett			
National	Bill English	Incumbent since 1990	2	
Green	Rachael Goldsmith		37	
Labour	Tat Loo		54	
Democrats	Robert Mills		14	
ACT	Don Nicholson		3	

Electorate (as at 21 October 2011): 42,664

=== Coromandel ===
2011 general election: Coromandel
Notes:	Blue background denotes an incumbent. Pink background denotes a current list MP. Yellow background denotes a retiring MP.			
Party	Candidate	Notes	List #	Source
Green	Catherine Delahunty	List MP since 2008	4	
Legalise Cannabis	Jay Fitton		12	
United Future New Zealand	Steve Graf			
Labour	Hugh Kininmonth		65	
Conservative	Bruce Rurehe			
National	Scott Simpson		61	
NZ First	Kevin Stone		25	
Independent	Mapuna Turner			
National	Sandra Goudie	Retired; MP since 2002		

Electorate (as at 21 October 2011): 45,117

=== Dunedin North ===
2011 general election: Dunedin North
Notes:	Blue background denotes an incumbent. Pink background denotes a current list MP. Yellow background denotes a retiring MP.			
Party	Candidate	Notes	List #	Source
Alliance	Victor Billot		6	
Labour	David Clark		49	
Legalise Cannabis	Julian Crawford		4	
United Future New Zealand	Pete George	Initially announced as standing for his own "Your NZ" party.	8	
ACT	Guy McCallum		46	
Democrats	Jeremy Noble		8	
Green	Metiria Turei	Party co-leader, List MP since 2002	1	
National	Michael Woodhouse	List MP since 2008	31	
Labour	Pete Hodgson	Retired; MP since 1990		

Electorate (as at 21 October 2011): 39,926

=== Dunedin South ===
2011 general election: Dunedin South
Notes:	Blue background denotes an incumbent. Pink background denotes a current list MP. Yellow background denotes a retiring MP.			
Party	Candidate	Notes	List #	Source
Labour	Clare Curran	Incumbent since 2008	28	
Green	Shane Gallagher		27	
ACT	Kimberly Hannah		37	
National	Jo Hayes		64	
Alliance	Kay Murray		1	
NZ First	Randall Ratana		20	
Democrats	Warren Voight		3	
Restore All Things In Christ	Robert Wansink			

Electorate (as at 21 October 2011): 45,132

=== East Coast ===
2011 general election: East Coast
Notes:	Blue background denotes an incumbent. Pink background denotes a current list MP. Yellow background denotes a retiring MP.			
Party	Candidate	Notes	List #	Source
United Future New Zealand	Martin Gibson		10	
Mana	Val Irwin		12	
Labour	Moana Mackey	List MP since 2003	19	
Green	Darryl Monteith		49	
ACT	John Norvill		48	
NZ First	Tamati Reid		30	
Conservative	Kathy Sheldrake		2	
National	Anne Tolley	Incumbent since 2005; List MP from 1999–2002	8	

Electorate (as at 21 October 2011): 40,533

=== East Coast Bays ===
2011 general election: East Coast Bays
Notes:	Blue background denotes an incumbent. Pink background denotes a current list MP. Yellow background denotes a retiring MP.			
Party	Candidate	Notes	List #	Source
Conservative	Simonne Dyer		7	
Labour	Vivienne Goldsmith		61	
ACT	Toby Hutton		21	
National	Murray McCully	Incumbent since 1987	11	
Green	Brett Stansfield		54	

Electorate (as at 21 October 2011): 46,232

=== Epsom ===
2011 general election: Epsom
Notes:	Blue background denotes an incumbent. Pink background denotes a current list MP. Yellow background denotes a retiring MP.			
Party	Candidate	Notes	List #	Source
ACT	John Banks	MP 1981–1999	4	
Independent	Penny Bright			
National	Paul Goldsmith		39	
Independent	Matthew Goode			
Green	David Hay		16	
Conservative	Simon Kan		8	
Mana	Pat O'Dea		15	
Labour	David Parker	MP since 2002, List since 2005	4	
ACT	Rodney Hide	Deposed; incumbent since 2005, list 1996–2005		

Electorate (as at 11 November 2011): 47,600

=== Hamilton East ===
2011 general election: Hamilton East
Notes:	Blue background denotes an incumbent. Pink background denotes a current list MP. Yellow background denotes a retiring MP.			
Party	Candidate	Notes	List #	Source
National	David Bennett	Incumbent since 2005	48	
Conservative	Robyn Jackson		20	
Pirate	Bruce Kingsbury			
ACT	Garry Mallett		45	
Green	Nick Marryatt		44	
Labour	Sehai Orgad		46	
NZ First	Gordon Stewart		29	
Democrats	Carolyn McKenzie	Announced, but not on final candidate list.	5	

Electorate (as at 11 November 2011): 44,689

=== Hamilton West ===
2011 general election: Hamilton West
Notes:	Blue background denotes an incumbent. Pink background denotes a current list MP. Yellow background denotes a retiring MP.			
Party	Candidate	Notes	List #	Source
Independent	Robert Curtis			
Conservative	Pat Gregory		21	
NZ First	Bill Gudgeon	List MP 2002–2005	16	
National	Tim Macindoe	Incumbent since 2008	49	
Labour	Sue Moroney	List MP since 2005	10	
Democrats	Les Port		13	
Independent	Tim Wikiriwhi			
ACT	Robin Boom	Announced, but standing in Waikato instead.		
Green	Max Coyle	Withdrew candidacy after comments to media by his partner		

Electorate (as at 11 November 2011): 44,293

=== Helensville ===
2011 general election: Helensville
Notes:	Blue background denotes an incumbent. Pink background denotes a current list MP. Yellow background denotes a retiring MP.			
Party	Candidate	Notes	List #	Source
Conservative	Richard Drayson			
Green	Jeanette Elley		19	
Labour	Jeremy Greenbrook-Held			
ACT	Nick Kearney		41	
National	John Key	Incumbent since 2002; Party leader; Prime Minister	1	
Legalise Cannabis	Adrian McDermott		20	

Electorate (as at 11 November 2011): 46,983

=== Hunua ===
2011 general election: Hunua
Notes:	Blue background denotes an incumbent. Pink background denotes a current list MP. Yellow background denotes a retiring MP.			
Party	Candidate	Notes	List #	Source
Conservative	Kevin Campbell		10	
ACT	Ian Cummings		19	
Labour	Richard Hills		50	
National	Paul Hutchison	Incumbent since 1996	26	
Democrats	Huia Mitchell		11	
NZ First	Doug Nabbs		26	
Māori Party	Thomas Phillips		14	
Green	Charmaine Watts		60	

Electorate (as at 11 November 2011): 46,578

=== Hutt South ===
2011 general election: Hutt South
Notes:	Blue background denotes an incumbent. Pink background denotes a current list MP. Yellow background denotes a retiring MP.			
Party	Candidate	Notes	List #	Source
Conservative	Gordon Copeland	List MP 2002–2008		
United Future New Zealand	Rob Eaddy		3	
Labour	Trevor Mallard	Incumbent since 1996; MP since 1993 and from 1984–90	9	
National	Paul Quinn	List since 2008	55	
ACT	Alex Speirs		25	
Green	Holly Walker		12	

Electorate (as at 11 November 2011): 42,391

=== Ilam ===
2011 general election: Ilam
Notes:	Blue background denotes an incumbent. Pink background denotes a current list MP. Yellow background denotes a retiring MP.			
Party	Candidate	Notes	List #	Source
National	Gerry Brownlee	Incumbent since 1996	4	
Green	Kennedy Graham	List since 2008	5	
Conservative	Roger Larkins			
Labour	John Parsons			
United Future New Zealand	Vanessa Roberts		7	
ACT	Gareth Veale		20	

Electorate (as at 11 November 2011): 44,692

=== Invercargill ===
2011 general election: Invercargill
Notes:	Blue background denotes an incumbent. Pink background denotes a current list MP. Yellow background denotes a retiring MP.			
Party	Candidate	Notes	List #	Source
ACT	Ian Carline		32	
Democrats	Stephnie de Ruyter		1	
Green	David Kennedy		23	
Libertarianz	Shane Pleasance		7	
National	Eric Roy	Incumbent since 2005	25	
Labour	Lesley Soper	List MP in 2005 and 2007–2008		

Electorate (as at 11 November 2011): 44,731

=== Kaikōura ===
2011 general election: Kaikōura
Notes:	Blue background denotes an incumbent. Pink background denotes a current list MP. Yellow background denotes a retiring MP.			
Party	Candidate	Notes	List #	Source
Green	Steffan Browning		10	
Labour	Liz Collyns			
ACT	Richard Evans		18	
Libertarianz	Ian Hayes		22	
National	Colin King	Incumbent since 2005	52	
Democrats	John McCaskey		10	

Electorate (as at 11 November 2011): 44,588

=== Mana ===
2011 general election: Mana
Notes:	Blue background denotes an incumbent. Pink background denotes a current list MP. Yellow background denotes a retiring MP.			
Party	Candidate	Notes	List #	Source
Labour	Kris Faafoi	Incumbent since 2010 by-election	41	
Legalise Cannabis	Richard Goode		9	
Green	Jan Logie		9	
National	Hekia Parata	List MP since 2008	18	
ACT	Michael Warren		54	

Electorate (as at 11 November 2011): 43,664

=== Māngere ===
2011 general election: Māngere
Notes:	Blue background denotes an incumbent. Pink background denotes a current list MP. Yellow background denotes a retiring MP.			
Party	Candidate	Notes	List #	Source
ACT	Casey Costello		34	
Conservative	Fa'avae Gagamoe		4	
National	Claudette Hauiti		63	
NZ First	Olivia Ilalio		28	
Mana	James Papali’i		6	
Green	Todd Ross		53	
Labour	William Sio	Incumbent since 2008	17	

Electorate (as at 11 November 2011): 38,722

=== Manukau East ===
2011 general election: Manukau East
Notes:	Blue background denotes an incumbent. Pink background denotes a current list MP. Yellow background denotes a retiring MP.			
Party	Candidate	Notes	List #	Source
National	Kanwal Singh Bakshi	List MP since 2008	35	
Communist League	Felicity Coggan			
ACT	Johnathan Macfarlane		44	
Mana	John Minto		3	
Conservative	Frank John Naea		15	
Labour	Ross Robertson	Incumbent since 1987		
NZ First	Asenati Taylor		8	

Electorate (as at 11 November 2011): 41,070

=== Manurewa ===
2011 general election: Manurewa
Notes:	Blue background denotes an incumbent. Pink background denotes a current list MP. Yellow background denotes a retiring MP.			
Party	Candidate	Notes	List #	Source
Conservative	Richard Addis			
National	Cam Calder	List MP since 2009	50	
Mana	Richard Shortland Cooper		10	
NZ First	John Hall		24	
ACT	David Peterson		49	
Labour	Louisa Wall	List MP in 2008 and 2011		
Labour	George Hawkins	Retired; MP since 1990		

Electorate (as at 11 November 2011): 38,767

=== Maungakiekie ===
2011 general election: Maungakiekie
Notes:	Blue background denotes an incumbent. Pink background denotes a current list MP. Yellow background denotes a retiring MP.			
Party	Candidate	Notes	List #	Source
Labour	Carol Beaumont	List MP since 2008	22	
Conservative	Grace Haden			
NZ First	Jerry Ho		15	
Green	Tom Land		41	
National	Pesata Sam Lotu-Iiga	Incumbent since 2008	29	
Mana	Barry Tumai		19	
ACT	Kath McCabe	Announced, but standing in Tauranga instead.	8	

Electorate (as at 11 November 2011): 45,630

=== Mount Albert ===
2011 general election: Mount Albert
Notes:	Blue background denotes an incumbent. Pink background denotes a current list MP. Yellow background denotes a retiring MP.			
Party	Candidate	Notes	List #	Source
ACT	Stephen Boyle		30	
Green	David Clendon	List MP since 2009	8	
National	Melissa Lee	List MP since 2008	33	
Conservative	Frank Poching		16	
Labour	David Shearer	Incumbent since 2009 by-election	31	

Electorate (as at 11 November 2011): 44,129

=== Mount Roskill ===
2011 general election: Mount Roskill
Notes:	Blue background denotes an incumbent. Pink background denotes a current list MP. Yellow background denotes a retiring MP.			
Party	Candidate	Notes	List #	Source
NZ First	Mahesh Bindra		21	
National	Jackie Blue	List MP since 2005	46	
Communist League	Patrick Brown			
Green	Julie Anne Genter		13	
Labour	Phil Goff	Incumbent since 1993; MP 1981–1990; party leader	1	
Legalise Cannabis	Jasmin Hewlett		6	
Conservative	Feleti Key		13	
United Future New Zealand	Bryan Mockridge		6	
ACT	Pratima Nand		15	

Electorate (as at 11 November 2011): 45,292

=== Napier ===
2011 general election: Napier
Notes:	Blue background denotes an incumbent. Pink background denotes a current list MP. Yellow background denotes a retiring MP.			
Party	Candidate	Notes	List #	Source
Green	Paul Bailey		31	
Conservative	Roy Brown		6	
Labour	Stuart Nash	List MP since 2008	27	
Alliance	Mary O'Neill		7	
ACT	John Ormond		11	
Mana	Rod Paul		16	
National	Chris Tremain	Incumbent since 2005	22	

Electorate (as at 11 November 2011): 43,824

=== Nelson ===
2011 general election: Nelson
Notes:	Blue background denotes an incumbent. Pink background denotes a current list MP. Yellow background denotes a retiring MP.			
Party	Candidate	Notes	List #	Source
Green	Aaryn Barlow		18	
NZ First	Kevin Gardener		17	
ACT	Paul Hufflett		39	
National	Nick Smith	Incumbent since 1990	6	
United Future	Doug Stevens		2	
Labour	Maryan Street	List MP since 2005	7	
Conservative	Oliver Vitali		26	

Electorate (as at 11 November 2011): 46,301

=== New Lynn ===
2011 general election: New Lynn
Notes:	Blue background denotes an incumbent. Pink background denotes a current list MP. Yellow background denotes a retiring MP.			
Party	Candidate	Notes	List #	Source
Conservative	Ivan Bailey		28	
Legalise Cannabis	Sean Davidson		19	
Labour	David Cunliffe	Incumbent since 1999	3	
National	Tim Groser	List MP since 2005	12	
ACT	Barbara Steinijans		53	
Green	Saffron Toms		28	
Legalise Cannabis	Dakta Green	Candidacy withdrawn		
ACT	Raja Venkatesh	Announced, but not on final candidate list.		

Electorate (as at 11 November 2011): 45,226

=== New Plymouth ===
2011 general election: New Plymouth
Notes:	Blue background denotes an incumbent. Pink background denotes a current list MP. Yellow background denotes a retiring MP.			
Party	Candidate	Notes	List #	Source
Legalise Cannabis	Jamie Dombroski		15	
Independent	Rusty Kane			
Labour	Andrew Little		15	
Green	Geoff Steedman		55	
National	Jonathan Young	Incumbent since 2008	45	

Electorate (as at 11 November 2011): 44,973

=== North Shore ===
2011 general election: North Shore
Notes:	Blue background denotes an incumbent. Pink background denotes a current list MP. Yellow background denotes a retiring MP.			
Party	Candidate	Notes	List #	Source
National	Maggie Barry		57	
ACT	Don Brash	Party leader; National Party list MP 2002–2007	1	
Labour	Ben Clark		69	
Conservative	Craig Jensen		25	
United Future	Damian Light		12	
Libertarianz	Michael Murphy		6	
Green	Pieter Watson		59	
NZ First	Andrew Williams	former North Shore City Mayor	3	
Legalise Cannabis	Leo Biggs	Announced, but standing in Northcote instead.	11	
National	Wayne Mapp	Retired; incumbent since 1996		

Electorate (as at 11 November 2011): 48,453

=== Northcote ===
2011 general election: Northcote
Notes:	Blue background denotes an incumbent. Pink background denotes a current list MP. Yellow background denotes a retiring MP.			
Party	Candidate	Notes	List #	Source
Legalise Cannabis	Leo Biggs		11	
National	Jonathan Coleman	Incumbent since 2005	16	
United Future New Zealand	Steven Dromgool			
Labour	Paula Gillon		67	
NZ First	Dion Jelley		23	
ACT	Tim Kronfeld		42	
Libertarianz	Peter Linton		20	
Green	Vernon Tava		57	
Conservative	Matthew Webster			

Electorate (as at 11 November 2011): 44,925

=== Northland ===
2011 general election: Northland
Notes:	Blue background denotes an incumbent. Pink background denotes a current list MP. Yellow background denotes a retiring MP.			
Party	Candidate	Notes	List #	Source
ACT	Barry Brill		31	
Green	Pauline Evans		36	
Mana	Ngawai Herewini		20	
Māori Party	Josephine Peita		10	
National	Mike Sabin		60	
Labour	Lynette Stewart		39	
Conservative	Melanie Taylor		23	
National	John Carter	Appointed High Commissioner, Cook Islands. MP Since 1987; incumbent since 1996		

Electorate (as at 11 November 2011): 43,628

=== Ōhariu ===
2011 general election: Ōhariu
Notes:	Blue background denotes an incumbent. Pink background denotes a current list MP. Yellow background denotes a retiring MP.			
Party	Candidate	Notes	List #	Source
NZ First	Hugh Barr		10	
Labour	Charles Chauvel	List MP since 2006	11	
United Future New Zealand	Peter Dunne	MP since 1984, Incumbent 1984–1993 (Labour) and since 2008, party leader	1	
Libertarianz	Sean Fitzpatrick		2	
Green	Gareth Hughes	List MP since 2010	7	
National	Katrina Shanks	List MP since 2007	38	
Conservative	Stephen Woodnutt			
Independent	Don Richards	Announced, but standing in Rongotai instead.		

Electorate (as at 11 November 2011): 45,900

=== Ōtaki ===
2011 general election: Ōtaki
Notes:	Blue background denotes an incumbent. Pink background denotes a current list MP. Yellow background denotes a retiring MP.			
Party	Candidate	Notes	List #	Source
United Future New Zealand	Diane Brown		14	
Labour	Peter Foster		57	
Green	Michael Gilchrist		21	
National	Nathan Guy	List MP 2005–2008, Incumbent since 2008	20	
Legalise Cannabis	Fred MacDonald		10	
ACT	Peter McCaffrey		26	
Conservative	John Ryersson			
NZ First	David Scott		19	
Independent	Philip Dean Taueki			

Electorate (as at 11 November 2011): 47,118

=== Pakuranga ===
2011 general election: Pakuranga
Notes:	Blue background denotes an incumbent. Pink background denotes a current list MP. Yellow background denotes a retiring MP.			
Party	Candidate	Notes	List #	Source
Conservative	Lance Gedge		19	
Labour	Sunny Kaushal			
NZ First	Helen Mulford		9	
ACT	Chris Simmons		6	
National	Maurice Williamson	Incumbent since 1987	19	

Electorate (as at 11 November 2011): 45,420

=== Palmerston North ===
2011 general election: Palmerston North
Notes:	Blue background denotes an incumbent. Pink background denotes a current list MP. Yellow background denotes a retiring MP.			
Party	Candidate	Notes	List #	Source
United Future New Zealand	Sultan Eusoff		4	
National	Leonie Hapeta		65	
Labour	Iain Lees-Galloway	Incumbent since 2008	37	
Conservative	Andrew Marquet			
ACT	Dan Stratton		22	
Green	Corrina Tucker		58	

Electorate (as at 11 November 2011): 42,897

=== Papakura ===
2011 general election: Papakura
Notes:	Blue background denotes an incumbent. Pink background denotes a current list MP. Yellow background denotes a retiring MP.			
Party	Candidate	Notes	List #	Source
NZ First	Brent Catchpole	List MP 2002–2005	13	
National	Judith Collins	Incumbent since 2002	7	
Green	Caroline Conroy		34	
Conservative	Bob Daw		18	
Labour	Jerome Mika		36	
ACT	John Thompson		10	

Electorate (as at 11 November 2011): 43,528

=== Port Hills ===
2011 general election: Port Hills
Notes:	Blue background denotes an incumbent. Pink background denotes a current list MP. Yellow background denotes a retiring MP.			
Party	Candidate	Notes	List #	Source
Green	Joseph Burston		25	
National	David Carter	MP since 1994, List MP since 1999	10	
Labour	Ruth Dyson	Incumbent since 1993	5	
NZ First	Denis O'Rourke		7	
ACT	Geoff Russell		51	

Electorate (as at 11 November 2011): 43,027

=== Rangitata ===
2011 general election: Rangitata
Notes:	Blue background denotes an incumbent. Pink background denotes a current list MP. Yellow background denotes a retiring MP.			
Party	Candidate	Notes	List #	Source
Labour	Julian Blanchard		56	
ACT	Tom Corbett		33	
National	Jo Goodhew	Incumbent since 2005	23	
Green	Gerrie Ligtenberg		42	
United Future New Zealand	Andrew McMillan		13	

Electorate (as at 11 November 2011): 47,712

=== Rangitīkei ===
2011 general election: Rangitīkei
Notes:	Blue background denotes an incumbent. Pink background denotes a current list MP. Yellow background denotes a retiring MP.			
Party	Candidate	Notes	List #	Source
Green	Maree Brannigan		33	
Mana	Peter Cleave		11	
ACT	Hayden Fitzgerald		24	
National	Ian McKelvie		58	
Labour	Josie Pagani		38	
Conservative	Ian Robertson			
Independent	Grant Seton			
Independent	Charles Turner			
National	Simon Power	Retired; incumbent since 1999		

Electorate (as at 11 November 2011): 41,013

=== Rimutaka ===
2011 general election: Rimutaka
Notes:	Blue background denotes an incumbent. Pink background denotes a current list MP. Yellow background denotes a retiring MP.			
Party	Candidate	Notes	List #	Source
ACT	Alwyn Courtenay		35	
National	Jonathan Fletcher		67	
Labour	Chris Hipkins	Incumbent since 2008	30	
Green	Tane Woodley		24	
NZ First	Joe Glenn	Withdrew candidacy at party's request		

Electorate (as at 11 November 2011): 43,709

=== Rodney ===
2011 general election: Rodney
Notes:	Blue background denotes an incumbent. Pink background denotes a current list MP. Yellow background denotes a retiring MP.			
Party	Candidate	Notes	List #	Source
Conservative	Colin Craig		1	
ACT	Beth Houlbrooke		38	
NZ First	Tracey Martin		2	
National	Mark Mitchell		59	
Green	Teresa Moore		51	
Labour	Christine Rose		42	
National	Lockwood Smith	Speaker of the House, standing as list MP, MP since 1984, incumbent since 1996		

Electorate (as at 11 November 2011): 48,829

=== Rongotai ===
2011 general election: Rongotai
Notes:	Blue background denotes an incumbent. Pink background denotes a current list MP. Yellow background denotes a retiring MP.			
Party	Candidate	Notes	List #	Source
National	Christopher Finlayson	List MP since 2005	9	
Labour	Annette King	MP since 1984, incumbent since 1996	2	
ACT	Joel Latimer		43	
Green	Russel Norman	List MP since 2008, party co-leader	2	
NZ First	Brett Pierson		27	
Independent	Don Richards	Initially announced as standing in Ōhariu.		
Māori Party	Aroha Rickus		17	
Conservative	Bruce Welsh			

Electorate (as at 11 November 2011): 44,825

=== Rotorua ===
2011 general election: Rotorua
Notes:	Blue background denotes an incumbent. Pink background denotes a current list MP. Yellow background denotes a retiring MP.			
Party	Candidate	Notes	List #	Source
Labour	Steve Chadwick	Incumbent 1999–2008, list MP since 2008	34	
National	Todd McClay	Incumbent since 2008	47	
Mana	Grant Rogers		17	
Conservative	Daryl Smith			
NZ First	Fletcher Tabuteau		11	
Libertarianz	Fred Stevens	Announced, but not on final candidate list.		

Electorate (as at 11 November 2011): 42,548

=== Selwyn ===
2011 general election: Selwyn
Notes:	Blue background denotes an incumbent. Pink background denotes a current list MP. Yellow background denotes a retiring MP.			
Party	Candidate	Notes	List #	Source
National	Amy Adams	Incumbent since 2008	28	
Conservative	Wilton Gray			
Labour	Jo Mclean			
Green	Eugenie Sage		6	
NZ First	Bill Woods		32	

Electorate (as at 11 November 2011): 46,345

=== Tāmaki ===
2011 general election: Tāmaki
Notes:	Blue background denotes an incumbent. Pink background denotes a current list MP. Yellow background denotes a retiring MP.			
Party	Candidate	Notes	List #	Source
Labour	Nick Bakulich		62	
Independent	Stephen Berry			
ACT	John Boscawen	List MP since 2008, chose to have no list ranking so would retire after election.		
Green	Richard Leckinger		17	
National	Simon O'Connor		62	
Conservative	Litia Simpson		9	
Independent	Wayne Young			
National	Allan Peachey	Incumbent since 2005; withdrew candidacy and list position due to health problems		

Electorate (as at 11 November 2011): 48,348

=== Taranaki-King Country ===
2011 general election: Taranaki-King Country
Notes:	Blue background denotes an incumbent. Pink background denotes a current list MP. Yellow background denotes a retiring MP.			
Party	Candidate	Notes	List #	Source
National	Shane Ardern	Incumbent since 1998	27	
Labour	Rick Barker	MP since 1993, list MP since 2005	25	
Green	Robert Moore		50	
United Future New Zealand	Victoria Rogers			

Electorate (as at 11 November 2011): 41,152

=== Taupō ===
2011 general election: Taupō
Notes:	Blue background denotes an incumbent. Pink background denotes a current list MP. Yellow background denotes a retiring MP.			
Party	Candidate	Notes	List #	Source
Conservative	Mark Breetvelt			
Labour	Frances Campbell			
ACT	Roseanne Jollands		40	
Green	Zane McCarthy		45	
NZ First	Edwin Perry	List MP 2002–2005	22	
Mana	Keriana Reedy		14	
United Future New Zealand	Alan Simmons		5	
National	Louise Upston	Incumbent since 2008	44	

Electorate (as at 11 November 2011): 45,381

=== Tauranga ===
2011 general election: Tauranga
Notes:	Blue background denotes an incumbent. Pink background denotes a current list MP. Yellow background denotes a retiring MP.			
Party	Candidate	Notes	List #	Source
Conservative	Larry Baldock	United Future list MP 2002–2005	3	
Māori Party	Awanui Black		5	
National	Simon Bridges	Incumbent since 2008	30	
Mana	Jayson Gardiner		9	
NZ First	Brendan Horan		6	
Independent	Yvette Lamare			
Labour	Deborah Mahuta-Coyle		26	
ACT	Kath McCabe	Originally announced for Maungakiekie.	8	
Green	Ian McLean		47	
Democrats	Katherine Ransom		4	

Electorate (as at 11 November 2011): 47,514

=== Te Atatū ===
2011 general election: Te Atatū
Notes:	Blue background denotes an incumbent. Pink background denotes a current list MP. Yellow background denotes a retiring MP.			
Party	Candidate	Notes	List #	Source
ACT	Dominic Costello		16	
National	Tau Henare	MP 1993–1999, list MP since 2005	40	
Conservative	Cynthia Liu		24	
Green	Gary Stewart		56	
Labour	Phil Twyford	List MP since 2008	33	
Independent	Chris Carter	Incumbent (Labour) 1993–96 and since 1999, removed from Labour caucus 2010		

Electorate (as at 11 November 2011): 42,742

=== Tukituki ===
2011 general election: Tukituki
Notes:	Blue background denotes an incumbent. Pink background denotes a current list MP. Yellow background denotes a retiring MP.			
Party	Candidate	Notes	List #	Source
ACT	Robert Burnside		23	
National	Craig Foss	Incumbent since 2005	21	
Labour	Julia Haydon-Carr		59	
Conservative	Stephen Jenkinson			
Green	Jim MacDonald		43	
Legalise Cannabis	Romana Manning		13	
Democrats	Barry Pulford		9	

Electorate (as at 11 November 2011): 44,264

=== Waikato ===
2011 general election: Waikato
Notes:	Blue background denotes an incumbent. Pink background denotes a current list MP. Yellow background denotes a retiring MP.			
Party	Candidate	Notes	List #	Source
ACT	Robin Boom	Initially announced as standing in Hamilton West.	29	
Conservative	Brian Dobbs		5	
Green	Cameron Harper		38	
Democrats	John Pemberton		2	
NZ First	Barbara Stewart	List MP 2002–2008	5	
Labour	Kate Sutton		35	
National	Lindsay Tisch	Incumbent since 1999	24	

Electorate (as at 11 November 2011): 41,623

=== Waimakariri ===
2011 general election: Waimakariri
Notes:	Blue background denotes an incumbent. Pink background denotes a current list MP. Yellow background denotes a retiring MP.			
Party	Candidate	Notes	List #	Source
Labour	Clayton Cosgrove	Incumbent since 1999	8	
Conservative	Tim de Vries		22	
Green	John Kelcher		39	
NZ First	Richard Prosser		4	
National	Kate Wilkinson	List MP since 2005	17	

Electorate (as at 11 November 2011): 46,911

=== Wairarapa ===
2011 general election: Wairarapa
Notes:	Blue background denotes an incumbent. Pink background denotes a current list MP. Yellow background denotes a retiring MP.			
Party	Candidate	Notes	List #	Source
ACT	Shane Atkinson		27	
Labour	Michael Bott		60	
National	John Hayes	Incumbent since 2005	51	
Libertarianz	Richard McGrath	Party leader	1	
Conservative	Brent Reid		29	
Green	Sea Rotmann		20	

Electorate (as at 11 November 2011): 46,165

=== Waitakere ===
2011 general election: Waitakere
Notes:	Blue background denotes an incumbent. Pink background denotes a current list MP. Yellow background denotes a retiring MP.			
Party	Candidate	Notes	List #	Source
National	Paula Bennett	MP since 2005, incumbent since 2008	14	
Mana	Sue Bradford	List MP (Green), 1999–2009	4	
Legalise Cannabis	Jeff Lye		5	
Conservative	Danny Mountain		27	
Libertarianz	Peter Osborne		5	
Labour	Carmel Sepuloni	List MP since 2008	24	
Green	Stephen Tollestrup		29	

Electorate (as at 11 November 2011): 42,201

=== Waitaki ===
2011 general election: Waitaki
Notes:	Blue background denotes an incumbent. Pink background denotes a current list MP. Yellow background denotes a retiring MP.			
Party	Candidate	Notes	List #	Source
Green	Sue Coutts		35	
National	Jacqui Dean	Incumbent since 2005	41	
Independent	David Ford			
Conservative	Jesse Misa		17	
Labour	Barry Monks		64	
ACT	Colin Nicholls		47	
Democrats	Hessel van Wieren		6	

Electorate (as at 11 November 2011): 49,209

=== Wellington Central ===
2011 general election: Wellington Central
Notes:	Blue background denotes an incumbent. Pink background denotes a current list MP. Yellow background denotes a retiring MP.			
Party	Candidate	Notes	List #	Source
Legalise Cannabis	Michael Appleby		1	
New Economics	Laurence Boomert			
Alliance	Kelly Buchanan		8	
NZ First	Ben Craven		14	
Libertarianz	Reagan Cutting		4	
National	Paul Foster-Bell		56	
Independent	Puhi Karena			
Pirate	Gynn Rickerby			
Labour	Grant Robertson	Incumbent since 2008	14	
Green	James Shaw		15	
Conservative	Paul Stipkovits			
ACT	Stephen Whittington		7	
United Future New Zealand	Monique Watson	Announced, but not on final candidate list.		

Electorate (as at 11 November 2011): 46,212

=== West Coast-Tasman ===
2011 general election: West Coast-Tasman
Notes:	Blue background denotes an incumbent. Pink background denotes a current list MP. Yellow background denotes a retiring MP.			
Party	Candidate	Notes	List #	Source
National	Chris Auchinvole	MP since 2005, incumbent since 2008	43	
ACT	Allan Birchfield		28	
United Future New Zealand	Clyde Graf		11	
Green	Kevin Hague	List MP since 2008	3	
Conservative	Claire Holley		14	
Labour	Damien O'Connor	MP 1993–2008, list MP since 2009		
Youth	Robert Terry			
Legalise Cannabis	Steven Wilkinson		8	
United Future New Zealand	Jackie Douglas	Withdrew candidacy		

Electorate (as at 11 November 2011): 44,144

=== Whanganui ===
2011 general election: Whanganui
Notes:	Blue background denotes an incumbent. Pink background denotes a current list MP. Yellow background denotes a retiring MP.			
Party	Candidate	Notes	List #	Source
National	Chester Borrows	Incumbent since 2005	32	
NZ First	Ian Brougham		31	
ACT	Alan Davidson		36	
Labour	Hamish McDouall		52	
Green	John Milnes		48	
Democrats	Heather Smith		7	

Electorate (as at 11 November 2011): 43,350

=== Whangarei ===
2011 general election: Whangarei
Notes:	Blue background denotes an incumbent. Pink background denotes a current list MP. Yellow background denotes a retiring MP.			
Party	Candidate	Notes	List #	Source
Green	Rick Bazeley		32	
Conservative	Ross Craig			
Democrats	Kenneth Goodhue		12	
ACT	Robin Grieve		14	
National	Phil Heatley	Incumbent since 1999	15	
Libertarianz	Helen Hughes		10	
Labour	Pat Newman		58	
NZ First	Pita Paraone	Former list MP 2002–2008	12	

Electorate (as at 11 November 2011): 46,068

=== Wigram ===
2011 general election: Wigram
Notes:	Blue background denotes an incumbent. Pink background denotes a current list MP. Yellow background denotes a retiring MP.			
Party	Candidate	Notes	List #	Source
Alliance	Kevin Campbell	Alliance List MP 1999–2002	3	
National	Sam Collins		66	
United Future New Zealand	Ian Gaskin		17	
Economic Euthenics	Tubby Hansen			
Legalise Cannabis	Geoffrey McTague		14	
Conservative	Mark Peters			
Green	Richard Wesley		61	
Labour	Megan Woods		47	
Progressive	Jim Anderton	MP since 1984, incumbent since 1996, party leader, ex-deputy PM		

Electorate (as at 11 November 2011): 44,563

== Māori electorates ==
=== Hauraki-Waikato ===
2011 general election: Hauraki-Waikato
Notes:	Blue background denotes an incumbent. Pink background denotes a current list MP. Yellow background denotes a retiring MP.			
Party	Candidate	Notes	List #	Source
Mana	Angeline Greensill		8	
Nga Iwi	Te Ariki Karamaene			
Labour	Nanaia Mahuta	Incumbent since 1996	12	
Māori Party	Tau Bruce Mataki			

Electorate (as at 11 November 2011): 32,513

=== Ikaroa-Rāwhiti ===
2011 general election: Ikaroa-Rāwhiti
Notes:	Blue background denotes an incumbent. Pink background denotes a current list MP. Yellow background denotes a retiring MP.			
Party	Candidate	Notes	List #	Source
Labour	Parekura Horomia	Incumbent since 1999	6	
Mana	Tawhai McClutchie		7	
Māori Party	Na Raihania			
Independent	Maurice Wairau			

Electorate (as at 11 November 2011): 32,364

=== Tāmaki Makaurau ===
2011 general election: Tāmaki Makaurau
Notes:	Blue background denotes an incumbent. Pink background denotes a current list MP. Yellow background denotes a retiring MP.			
Party	Candidate	Notes	List #	Source
Green	Mikaere Curtis		26	
Labour	Shane Jones	List MP since 2005	16	
Mana	Kereama Pene			
Māori Party	Pita Sharples	Incumbent since 2005, party co-leader	8	

Electorate (as at 11 November 2011): 34,628

=== Te Tai Hauāuru ===
2011 general election: Te Tai Hauāuru
Notes:	Blue background denotes an incumbent. Pink background denotes a current list MP. Yellow background denotes a retiring MP.			
Party	Candidate	Notes	List #	Source
Green	Jack McDonald		30	
Labour	Soraya Peke-Mason		56	
Mana	Frederick Timutimu			
Māori Party	Tariana Turia	Incumbent since 1999; MP since 1996 (Labour), party co-leader	7	
Nga Iwi	Jennifer Waitai-Rapana			
Sovereignty	Robert Piriniha Wilson			

Electorate (as at 11 November 2011): 32,002

=== Te Tai Tokerau ===
2011 general election: Te Tai Tokerau
Notes:	Blue background denotes an incumbent. Pink background denotes a current list MP. Yellow background denotes a retiring MP.			
Party	Candidate	Notes	List #	Source
Labour	Kelvin Davis	List MP since 2008	23	
Mana	Hone Harawira	Incumbent since 2005	1	
Legalise Cannabis	Maki Herbert		3	
Māori Party	Waihoroi Shortland		1	

Electorate (as at 11 November 2011): 33,067

=== Te Tai Tonga ===
2011 general election: Te Tai Tonga
Notes:	Blue background denotes an incumbent. Pink background denotes a current list MP. Yellow background denotes a retiring MP.			
Party	Candidate	Notes	List #	Source
Mana	Clinton Dearlove			
Māori Party	Rahui Katene	Incumbent since 2008		
Legalise Cannabis	Emma-Jane Mihaere Kingi		7	
Green	Dora Langsbury		22	
Labour	Rino Tirikatene		45	

Electorate (as at 11 November 2011): 30,956

=== Waiariki ===
2011 general election: Waiariki
Notes:	Blue background denotes an incumbent. Pink background denotes a current list MP. Yellow background denotes a retiring MP.			
Party	Candidate	Notes	List #	Source
Māori Party	Te Ururoa Flavell	Incumbent since 2005	9	
Mana	Annette Sykes		2	
Labour	Louis Te Kani		53	

Electorate (as at 11 November 2011): 32,568
