= Party lists in the 2011 New Zealand general election =

New Zealand political candidates in the MMP era
Year	Party list	Candidates
1996	party lists	by electorate
1999	party lists	by electorate
2002	party lists	by electorate
2005	party lists	by electorate
2008	party lists	by electorate
2011	party lists	by electorate
2014	party lists	by electorate
2017	party lists	by electorate
2020	party lists	by electorate
2023	party lists	by electorate
2026	party lists	by electorate

This page provides the party lists for New Zealand's 2011 general election. Party lists determine (in the light of country-wide proportional voting) the appointment of list MPs under the mixed-member proportional (MMP) representation electoral system. The Electoral Commission issued a deadline of noon on 1 November for submitting party lists.

== Successful parties ==
Parties are ordered according to their share of the vote.

=== National Party ===
The National Party released a party list of 75 candidates in early September. The list was revised when Allan Peachey, ranked 48th, withdrew due to ill health. Simon O'Connor, who replaced Peachey as candidate for the Tāmaki electorate, was then added to the list, albeit in a lower position than Peachey had held.

Rank	Name	Incumbency	Contesting electorate	Previous rank	Change	Initial results	Later changes
1	John Key	Electorate	Helensville	1	0	✓ Won Helensville	
2	Bill English	Electorate	Clutha-Southland	2	0	✓ Won Clutha-Southland	
3	Lockwood Smith	Electorate		12	+9	✓ Elected from list	✗ Left parliament in 2013
4	Gerry Brownlee	Electorate	Ilam	3	−1	✓ Won Ilam	
5	Tony Ryall	Electorate	Bay of Plenty	6	+1	✓ Won Bay of Plenty	
6	Nick Smith	Electorate	Nelson	5	−1	✓ Won Nelson	
7	Judith Collins	Electorate	Papakura	7	0	✓ Won Papakura	
8	Anne Tolley	Electorate	East Coast	10	+2	✓ Won East Coast	
9	Chris Finlayson	List	Rongotai	14	+5	✓ Elected from list	
10	David Carter	List	Port Hills	9	−1	✓ Elected from list	
11	Murray McCully	Electorate	East Coast Bays	11	0	✓ Won East Coast Bays	
12	Tim Groser	List	New Lynn	15	+3	✓ Elected from list	
13	Steven Joyce	List		16	+3	✓ Elected from list	
14	Paula Bennett	Electorate	Waitakere	41	+27	✓ Won Waitakere	
15	Phil Heatley	Electorate	Whangarei	22	+7	✓ Won Whangarei	
16	Jonathan Coleman	Electorate	Northcote	29	+13	✓ Won Northcote	
17	Kate Wilkinson	List	Waimakariri	30	+13	✓ Won Waimakariri	
18	Hekia Parata	List	Mana	36	+18	✓ Elected from list	
19	Maurice Williamson	Electorate	Pakuranga	8	−11	✓ Won Pakuranga	
20	Nathan Guy	Electorate	Ōtaki	18	−2	✓ Won Ōtaki	
21	Craig Foss	Electorate	Tukituki	33	+12	✓ Won Tukituki	
22	Chris Tremain	Electorate	Napier	31	+9	✓ Won Napier	
23	Jo Goodhew	Electorate	Rangitata	39	+16	✓ Won Rangitata	
24	Lindsay Tisch	Electorate	Waikato	19	−5	✓ Won Waikato	
25	Eric Roy	Electorate	Invercargill	28	+3	✓ Won Invercargill	
26	Paul Hutchison	Electorate	Hunua	23	−3	✓ Won Hunua	
27	Shane Ardern	Electorate	Taranaki-King Country	24	−3	✓ Won Taranaki-King Country	
28	Amy Adams	Electorate	Selwyn	52	+24	✓ Won Selwyn	
29	Sam Lotu-Iiga	Electorate	Maungakiekie	35	+6	✓ Won Maungakiekie	
30	Simon Bridges	Electorate	Tauranga	51	+21	✓ Won Tauranga	
31	Michael Woodhouse	List	Dunedin North	49	+18	✓ Elected from list	
32	Chester Borrows	Electorate	Whanganui	32	0	✓ Won Whanganui	
33	Nikki Kaye	Electorate	Auckland Central	57	+24	✓ Won Auckland Central	
34	Melissa Lee	List	Mount Albert	37	+3	✓ Elected from list	
35	Kanwal Singh Bakshi	List	Manukau East	38	+3	✓ Elected from list	
36	Jian Yang			—	—	✓ Elected from list	
37	Alfred Ngaro			—	—	✓ Elected from list	
38	Katrina Shanks	List	Ōhariu	46	+8	✓ Elected from list	✗ Left parliament in 2014
39	Paul Goldsmith		Epsom	—	—	✓ Elected from list	
40	Tau Henare	List	Te Atatū	26	−14	✓ Elected from list	
41	Jacqui Dean	Electorate	Waitaki	40	−1	✓ Won Waitaki	
42	Nicky Wagner	List	Christchurch Central	43	+1	✓ Won Christchurch Central	
43	Chris Auchinvole	Electorate	West Coast-Tasman	42	−1	✓ Elected from list	
44	Louise Upston	Electorate	Taupō	53	+9	✓ Won Taupō	
45	Jonathan Young	Electorate	New Plymouth	66	+21	✓ Won New Plymouth	
46	Jackie Blue	List	Mount Roskill	45	−1	✓ Elected from list	✗ Left parliament in 2013
47	Todd McClay	Electorate	Rotorua	54	+7	✓ Won Rotorua	
48	David Bennett	Electorate	Hamilton East	44	−4	✓ Won Hamilton East	
49	Tim Macindoe	Electorate	Hamilton West	55	+6	✓ Won Hamilton West	
50	Cam Calder	List	Manurewa	58	+8	✓ Elected from list	
51	John Hayes	Electorate	Wairarapa	50	−1	✓ Won Wairarapa	
52	Colin King	Electorate	Kaikōura	47	−5	✓ Won Kaikōura	
53	Aaron Gilmore	List	Christchurch East	56	+3	✗ Lost seat	✓ Replaced Lockwood Smith in 2013. ✗ Left parliament in 2013
54	Jami-Lee Ross	Electorate	Botany	—	—	✓ Won Botany	
55	Paul Quinn	List	Hutt South	48	−7	✗ Lost seat	
56	Paul Foster-Bell		Wellington Central	—	—		✓ Replaced Jackie Blue in 2013
57	Maggie Barry		North Shore	—	—	✓ Won North Shore	
58	Ian McKelvie		Rangitikei	—	—	✓ Won Rangitikei	
59	Mark Mitchell		Rodney	—	—	✓ Won Rodney	
60	Mike Sabin		Northland	—	—	✓ Won Northland	
61	Scott Simpson		Coromandel	—	—	✓ Won Coromandel	
62	Simon O'Connor		Tāmaki	72	+10	✓ Won Tāmaki	
63	Claudette Hauiti		Māngere	—	—		✓ Replaced Aaron Gilmore in 2013
64	Jo Hayes		Dunedin South	—	—		✓ Replaced Katrina Shanks in 2014
65	Leonie Hapeta		Palmerston North	—	—		
66	Sam Collins		Wigram	—	—		
67	Jonathan Fletcher		Rimutaka	—	—		
68	Heather Tanner			—	—		
69	Denise Krum			(United Future: 3)	−66		
70	Carolyn O'Fallon			—	—		
71	Viv Gurrey			71	0		
72	Karen Rolleston			—	—		
73	Brett Hudson			—	—		
74	Linda Cooper			—	—		
75	Karl Varley			—	—		

=== Labour Party ===
The Labour Party announced a party list of 70 candidates.

Four sitting MPs were not placed on the list. Damien O'Connor, a list MP contesting West Coast-Tasman, and Lianne Dalziel, MP for Christchurch East, both declined a place on the list stating they only wanted to represent the electorate they held candidacy for. Louisa Wall, who had twice entered Parliament as a list MP following another list member's resignation, also stood as an electorate-only candidate in Manurewa. Manukau East MP Ross Robertson has never accepted a list position.

Rank	Name	Incumbency	Contesting electorate	Previous rank	Change	Initial results	Later changes
1	Phil Goff	Electorate	Mount Roskill	3	+2	✓ Won Mount Roskill	
2	Annette King	Electorate	Rongotai	4	+2	✓ Won Rongotai	
3	David Cunliffe	Electorate	New Lynn	8	+5	✓ Won New Lynn	
4	David Parker	List	Epsom	17	+13	✓ Elected from list	
5	Ruth Dyson	Electorate	Port Hills	13	+8	✓ Won Port Hills	
6	Parekura Horomia	Electorate	Ikaroa-Rāwhiti	5	−1	✓ Won Ikaroa-Rāwhiti	✗ Died in 2013
7	Maryan Street	List	Nelson	9	+2	✓ Elected from list	
8	Clayton Cosgrove	Electorate	Waimakariri	18	+10	✓ Elected from list	
9	Trevor Mallard	Electorate	Hutt South	14	+5	✓ Won Hutt South	
10	Sue Moroney	List	Hamilton West	22	+12	✓ Elected from list	
11	Charles Chauvel	List	Ōhariu	27	+16	✓ Elected from list	✗ Left parliament in 2013
12	Nanaia Mahuta	Electorate	Hauraki-Waikato	10	−2	✓ Won Hauraki-Waikato	
13	Jacinda Ardern	List	Auckland Central	20	+7	✓ Elected from list	
14	Grant Robertson	Electorate	Wellington Central	64	+50	✓ Won Wellington Central	
15	Andrew Little		New Plymouth	—	—	✓ Elected from list	
16	Shane Jones	List	Tāmaki Makaurau	16	0	✓ Elected from list	✗ Left parliament in 2014
17	William Sio	Electorate	Māngere	24	+7	✓ Won Māngere	
18	Darien Fenton	List		33	+15	✓ Elected from list	
19	Moana Mackey	List	East Coast	25	+6	✓ Elected from list	
20	Rajen Prasad	List		12	−8	✓ Elected from list	
21	Raymond Huo	List		21	0	✓ Elected from list	
22	Carol Beaumont	List	Maungakiekie	28	+6	✗ Lost seat	✓ Replaced Charles Chauvel in 2013
23	Kelvin Davis	List	Te Tai Tokerau	29	+6	✗ Lost seat	✓ Replaced Shane Jones in 2014
24	Carmel Sepuloni	List	Waitakere	35	+11	✗ Lost seat	
25	Rick Barker	List	Taranaki-King Country	34	+9	✗ Lost seat	
26	Deborah Mahuta-Coyle		Tauranga	—	—		
27	Stuart Nash	List	Napier	36	+9	✗ Lost seat	
28	Clare Curran	Electorate	Dunedin South	45	+17	✓ Won Dunedin South	
29	Brendon Burns	Electorate	Christchurch Central	49	+20	✗ Lost seat	
30	Chris Hipkins	Electorate	Rimutaka	47	+17	✓ Won Rimutaka	
31	David Shearer	Electorate	Mount Albert	—	—	✓ Won Mount Albert	
32	Michael Wood			56	+24		
33	Phil Twyford	List	Te Atatū	26	−7	✓ Won Te Atatū	
34	Steve Chadwick	List	Rotorua	30	−4	✗ Lost seat	
35	Kate Sutton		Waikato	63	+28		
36	Jerome Mika		Papakura	—	—		
37	Iain Lees-Galloway	Electorate	Palmerston North	48	+11	✓ Won Palmerston North	
38	Josie Pagani		Rangitikei	(Progressive: 3)	−35		
39	Lynette Stewart		Northland	—	—		
40	Jordan Carter			70	+30		
41	Kris Faafoi	Electorate	Mana	—	—	✓ Won Mana	
42	Christine Rose		Rodney	—	—		
43	Glenda Alexander			—	—		
44	Susan Zhu			62	+18		
45	Rino Tirikatene		Te Tai Tonga	—	—	✓ Won Te Tai Tonga	
46	Sehai Orgad		Hamilton East	—	—		
47	Megan Woods		Wigram	—	—	✓ Won Wigram	
48	Mea'ole Keil			—	—		
49	David Clark		Dunedin North	—	—	✓ Won Dunedin North	
50	Richard Hills		Hunua	—	—		
51	Anahila Suisuiki			—	—		
52	Hamish McDouall		Whanganui	60	+8		
53	Louis Te Kani		Waiariki	—	—		
54	Tat Loo		Clutha-Southland	—	—		
55	Soraya Peke-Mason		Te Tai Hauāuru	—	—		
56	Julian Blanchard		Rangitata	59	+3		
57	Peter Foster		Ōtaki	—	—		
58	Pat Newman		Whangarei	—	—		
59	Julia Haydon-Carr		Tukituki	—	—		
60	Michael Bott		Wairarapa	—	—		
61	Vivienne Goldsmith		East Coast Bays	67	+6		
62	Nick Bakulich		Tāmaki	—	—		
63	Chris Yoo			53	−10		
64	Barry Monks		Waitaki	—	—		
65	Hugh Kininmonth		Coromandel	75	+10		
66	Jo Kim			—	—		
67	Paula Gillon		Northcote	(Progressive: 4)	−63		
68	Carol Devoy-Heena		Bay of Plenty	76	+8		
69	Ben Clark		North Shore	—	—		
70	Chao-Fu Wu		Botany	—	—		

=== Green Party ===
The Green Party, after announcing a preliminary list in April, announced a list of thirty people in late May. In accordance with party rules, the remainder of the candidate pool was then ranked in alphabetical order, with the final list submitted to the Electoral Commission having sixty-one people.

Rank	Name	Incumbency	Contesting electorate	Previous rank	Change	Initial results	Later changes
1	Metiria Turei	List	Dunedin North	4	+3	✓ Elected from list	
2	Russel Norman	List	Rongotai	2	0	✓ Elected from list	
3	Kevin Hague	List	West Coast-Tasman	7	+4	✓ Elected from list	
4	Catherine Delahunty	List	Coromandel	8	+4	✓ Elected from list	
5	Kennedy Graham	List	Ilam	9	+4	✓ Elected from list	
6	Eugenie Sage		Selwyn	—	—	✓ Elected from list	
7	Gareth Hughes	List	Ōhariu	11	+4	✓ Elected from list	
8	David Clendon	List	Mount Albert	10	+2	✓ Elected from list	
9	Jan Logie		Mana	—	—	✓ Elected from list	
10	Steffan Browning		Kaikōura	12	+2	✓ Elected from list	
11	Denise Roche		Auckland Central	42	+31	✓ Elected from list	
12	Holly Walker		Hutt South	—	—	✓ Elected from list	
13	Julie Anne Genter		Mount Roskill	—	—	✓ Elected from list	
14	Mojo Mathers		Christchurch East	13	−1	✓ Elected from list	
15	James Shaw		Wellington Central	41	+26		
16	David Hay		Epsom	21	+5		
17	Richard Leckinger		Tāmaki	17	0		
18	Aaryn Barlow		Nelson	—	—		
19	Jeanette Elley		Helensville	18	−1		
20	Sea Rotmann		Wairarapa	—	—		
21	Michael Gilchrist		Ōtaki	60	+39		
22	Dora Langsbury		Te Tai Tonga	51	+29		
23	David Kennedy		Invercargill	—	—		
24	Tane Woodley		Rimutaka	—	—		
25	Joseph Burston		Port Hills	66	+41		
26	Mikaere Curtis		Tāmaki Makaurau	16	−10		
27	Shane Gallagher		Dunedin South	62	+35		
28	Saffron Toms		New Lynn	—	—		
29	Stephen Tollestrup		Waitakere	—	—		
30	Zachary Dorner			63	+33		
31	Paul Bailey		Napier	—	—		
32	Rick Bazeley		Whangarei	—	—		
33	Maree Brannigan		Rangitikei	—	—		
34	Caroline Conroy		Papakura	—	—		
35	Sue Coutts		Waitaki	—	—		
36	Pauline Evans		Northland	—	—		
37	Rachael Goldsmith		Clutha-Southland	—	—		
38	Cameron Harper		Waikato	—	—		
39	John Kelcher		Waimakariri	—	—		
40	Alex Kruize			—	—		
41	Tom Land		Maungakiekie	—	—		
42	Gerrie Ligtenberg		Rangitata	—	—		
43	Jim MacDonald		Tukituki	—	—		
44	Nick Marryatt		Hamilton East	—	—		
45	Zane McCarthy		Taupō	—	—		
46	Jack McDonald		Te Tai Hauāuru	—	—		
47	Ian McLean		Tauranga	—	—		
48	John Milnes		Whanganui	48	0		
49	Darryl Monteith		East Coast	—	—		
50	Robert Moore		Taranaki-King Country	—	—		
51	Teresa Moore		Rodney	—	—		
52	David Moorhouse		Christchurch Central	—	—		
53	Todd Ross		Māngere	—	—		
54	Brett Stansfield		East Coast Bays	40	−14		
55	Geoff Steedman		New Plymouth	—	—		
56	Gary Stewart		Te Atatū	38	−18		
57	Vernon Tava		Northcote	—	—		
58	Corrina Tucker		Palmerson North	—	—		
59	Pieter Watson		North Shore	32	−27		
60	Charmaine Watts		Hunua	—	—		
61	Richard Wesley		Wigram	—	—		

=== New Zealand First ===
New Zealand First released a party list of thirty-three people on 1 November.

Rank	Name	Incumbency	Contesting electorate	Previous rank	Change	Initial results	Later changes
1	Winston Peters	(Former MP)		1	0	✓ Elected from list	
2	Tracey Martin		Rodney	13	+11	✓ Elected from list	
3	Andrew Williams		North Shore	—	—	✓ Elected from list	
4	Richard Prosser		Waimakariri	—	—	✓ Elected from list	
5	Barbara Stewart	(Former MP)	Waikato	5	0	✓ Elected from list	
6	Brendan Horan		Tauranga	10	+4	✓ Elected from list	
7	Denis O'Rourke		Port Hills	—	—	✓ Elected from list	
8	Asenati Taylor		Manukau East	7	−1	✓ Elected from list	
9	Helen Mulford		Pakuranga	16	+7		
10	Hugh Barr		Ōhariu	—	—		
11	Fletcher Tabuteau		Rotorua	—	—		
12	Pita Paraone	(Former MP)	Whangarei	6	−6		
13	Brent Catchpole	(Former MP)	Papakura	15	+2		
14	Ben Craven		Wellington Central	—	—		
15	Jerry Ho		Maungakiekie	—	—		
16	Bill Gudgeon	(Former MP)	Hamilton West	—	—		
17	Kevin Gardener		Nelson	—	—		
18	Ray Dolman		Bay of Plenty	—	—		
19	David Scott		Ōtaki	12	−7		
20	Randall Ratana		Dunedin South	—	—		
21	Mahesh Bindra		Mount Roskill	—	—		
22	Edwin Perry	(Former MP)	Taupō	8	−14		
23	Dion Jelley		Northcote	—	—		
24	John Hall		Manurewa	20	−4		
25	Kevin Stone		Coromandel	—	—		
26	Doug Nabbs		Hunua	19	−7		
27	Brett Pierson		Rongotai	—	—		
28	Olivia Ilalio		Māngere	—	—		
29	Gordon Stewart		Hamilton East	—	—		
30	Tamati Reid		East Coast	—	—		
31	Ian Brougham		Whanganui	—	—		
32	Bill Woods		Selwyn	—	—		
33	Allen Davies		Auckland Central	—	—		

=== Māori Party ===
The Māori Party released a party list of 17 candidates on 29 October.

Rank	Name	Incumbency	Contesting electorate	Previous rank	Change	Initial results	Later changes
1	Waihoroi Shortland		Te Tai Tokerau	—	—		
2	Kaapua Smith			—	—		
3	Wheturangi Walsh-Tapiata			—	—		
4	Tina Porou			—	—		
5	Awanui Black		Tauranga	18	+13		
6	Davina Murray			—	—		
7	Tariana Turia	Electorate	Te Tai Hauauru	1	−6	✓ Won Te Tai Hauauru	
8	Pita Sharples	Electorate	Tamaki Makaurau	2	−6	✓ Won Tamaki Makaurau	
9	Te Ururoa Flavell	Electorate	Waiariki	4	−5	✓ Won Waiariki	
10	Josie Peita		Northland	15	+5		
11	Paora Te Hurihanganui			—	—		
12	Fallyn Flavell			—	—		
13	Daryl Christie			—	—		
14	Tom Phillips		Hunua	—	—		
15	Tim Morrison			—	—		
16	Tamai Nicholson			—	—		
17	Aroha Rickus		Rongotai	—	—		

=== Mana Party ===
The Mana Party announced a party list of twenty people on 1 November.

Rank	Name	Incumbency	Contesting electorate	Previous rank	Change	Initial results	Later changes
1	Hone Harawira	Electorate	Te Tai Tokerau	(Māori: 3)	+2	✓ Won Te Tai Tokerau	
2	Annette Sykes		Waiariki	—	—		
3	John Minto		Manukau East	—	—		
4	Sue Bradford	(Former MP)	Waitakere	(Green: 3)	−1		
5	Misty Harrison			—	—		
6	James Papali’i		Māngere	—	—		
7	Tawhai McClutchie		Ikaroa-Rāwhiti	—	—		
8	Angeline Greensill		Hauraki-Waikato	(Māori: 5)	−3		
9	Jayson Gardiner		Tauranga	—	—		
10	Richard Shortland Cooper		Manurewa	—	—		
11	Peter Cleave		Rangitīkei	—	—		
12	Val Irwin		East Coast	—	—		
13	Sharon Stevens			—	—		
14	Keriana Reedy		Taupō	—	—		
15	Pat O'Dea		Epsom	(RAM: 12)	−3		
16	Rod Paul		Napier	—	—		
17	Grant Rogers		Rotorua	(RAM: 10)	−7		
18	Te Nguha Huirama-Patuwai			—	—		
19	Barry Tumai		Maungakiekie	—	—		
20	Ngawai Herewini		Northland	—	—		

=== ACT New Zealand ===
ACT New Zealand released its party list on 28 August. A modified list was announced in October, reflecting the withdrawal of parliamentary leader John Boscawen (who was initially ranked second) and the confirmation of Catherine Isaac (whose name had not been officially released due to uncertainty about her availability). The full list eventually submitted to the Electoral Commission had fifty-five people on it, with those not previously ranked (with the exception of the very last) being ranked alphabetically.

Rank	Name	Incumbency	Contesting electorate	Previous rank	Change	Initial results	Later changes
1	Don Brash	(Former MP)	North Shore	—	—		
2	Catherine Isaac			—	—		
3	Don Nicolson		Clutha-Southland	—	—		
4	John Banks	(Former MP)	Epsom	—	—	✓ Won Epsom	✗ Left parliament in 2014
5	David Seymour		Auckland Central	55	+50		
6	Chris Simmons		Pakuranga	53	+47		
7	Stephen Whittington		Wellington Central	—	—		
8	Kath McCabe		Maungakiekie	42	+34		
9	Robyn Stent			—	—		
10	John Thompson		Papakura	22	+12		
11	John Ormond		Napier	8	−3		
12	Lyn Murphy		Botany	14	+2		
13	Kevin Moratti			—	—		
14	Robin Grieve		Whangarei	—	—		
15	Pratima Nand		Mount Roskill	—	—		
16	Dominic Costello		Te Atatū	—	—		
17	Toni Severin		Christchurch Central	54	+37		
18	Richard Evans		Kaikōura	—	—		
19	Ian Cummings		Hunua	—	—		
20	Gareth Veale		Ilam	—	—		
21	Toby Hutton		East Coast Bays	—	—		
22	Daniel Stratton		Palmerston North	—	—		
23	Robert Burnside		Tukituki	—	—		
24	Hayden Fitzgerald		Rangitīkei	—	—		
25	Alex Speirs		Hutt South	—	—		
26	Peter McCaffrey		Ōtaki	43	+17		
27	Shane Atkinson		Wairarapa	29	+2		
28	Allan Birchfield		West Coast-Tasman	—	—		
29	Robin Boom		Waikato	—	—		
30	Stephen Boyle		Mount Albert	—	—		
31	Barry Brill	(Former MP)	Northland	—	—		
32	Ian Carline		Invercargill	—	—		
33	Tom Corbett		Rangitata	—	—		
34	Casey Costello		Māngere	—	—		
35	Alwyn Courtenay		Rimutaka	—	—		
36	Alan Daniel Davidson		Whanganui	32	−4		
37	Kimberly Hannah		Dunedin South	—	—		
38	Beth Houlbrooke		Rodney	—	—		
39	Paul Hufflett		Nelson	—	—		
40	Rosanne Jollands		Taupō	—	—		
41	Nick Kearney		Helensville	13	−28		
42	Tim Kronfeld		Northcote	—	—		
43	Joel Latimer		Rongotai	—	—		
44	Jonathan Macfarlane		Manukau East	—	—		
45	Garry Mallett		Hamilton East	39	−6		
46	Guy McCallum		Dunedin North	—	—		
47	Colin Nicholls		Waitaki	47	0		
48	John Norvill		East Coast	—	—		
49	David Peterson		Manurewa	—	—		
50	James Read			50	0		
51	Geoff Russell		Port Hills	52	+1		
52	Andrew Sharrock			—	—		
53	Barbara Steinijans		New Lynn	—	—		
54	Michael Warren		Mana	—	—		
55	Vince Ashworth			28	−27		

=== United Future ===
United Future released a party list of fifteen people on 20 October.

Rank	Name	Incumbency	Contesting electorate	Previous rank	Change	Initial results	Later changes
1	Peter Dunne	Electorate	Ōhariu	1	0	✓ Won Ōhariu	
2	Doug Stevens		Nelson	—	—		
3	Rob Eaddy		Hutt South	—	—		
4	Sultan Eusoff		Palmerston North	—	—		
5	Alan Simmons		Taupō	—	—		
6	Bryan Mockridge		Mount Roskill	21	+15		
7	Vanessa Roberts		Ilam	14	+7		
8	Pete George		Dunedin North	—	—		
9	Ram Prakash		Botany	—	—		
10	Martin Gibson		East Coast	—	—		
11	Clyde Graf		West Coast-Tasman	—	—		
12	Damian Light		North Shore	13	+1		
13	Andrew McMillan		Rangitata	—	—		
14	Diane Brown		Ōtaki	25	+11		
15	Brian Carter		Bay of Plenty	—	—		
16	Johnny Miller		Christchurch East	—	—		
17	Ian Gaskin		Wigram	—	—		

== Unsuccessful parties ==
=== Conservative Party ===
The Conservative Party released a party list of thirty people on 1 November.

Rank	Name	Incumbency	Contesting electorate	Previous rank	Change	Initial results	Later changes
1	Colin Craig		Rodney	—	—		
2	Kathy Sheldrake		East Coast	—	—		
3	Larry Baldock	(Former MP)	Tauranga	(Kiwi: 1)	−2		
4	Fa'avae Gagamoe		Māngere	—	—		
5	Brian Dobbs		Waikato	—	—		
6	Roy Brown		Napier	—	—		
7	Simonne Dyer		East Coast Bays	(Kiwi: 5)	−2		
8	Simon Kan		Epsom	(Kiwi: 3)	−5		
9	Litia Simpson		Tāmaki	—	—		
10	Kevin Campbell		Hunua	—	—		
11	Paul Young		Botany	—	—		
12	Leighton Baker		Christchurch East	(Kiwi: 10)	−2		
13	Feleti Key		Mount Roskill	—	—		
14	Claire Holley		West Coast-Tasman	—	—		
15	Frank John Naea		Manukau East	(Kiwi: 4)	−11		
16	Frank Poching		Mount Albert	—	—		
17	Jesse Misa		Waitaki	—	—		
18	Bob Daw		Papakura	—	—		
19	Lance Gedge		Pakuranga	—	—		
20	Robyn Jackson		Hamilton East	(Kiwi: 13)	−7		
21	Pat Gregory		Hamilton West	—	—		
22	Timothy de Vries		Waimakariri	—	—		
23	Melanie Taylor		Northland	(Family: 8)	−15		
24	Cynthia Liu		Te Atatū	—	—		
25	Craig Jensen		North Shore	—	—		
26	Oliver Vitali		Nelson	—	—		
27	Danny Mountain		Waitakere	—	—		
28	Ivan Bailey		New Lynn	—	—		
29	Brent Reid		Wairarapa	—	—		
30	Michael Cooke		Christchurch Central	—	—		

=== Aotearoa Legalise Cannabis Party ===
The Aotearoa Legalise Cannabis Party released a party list of 28 candidates on 29 October.

Rank	Name	Incumbency	Contesting electorate	Previous rank	Change	Initial results	Later changes
1	Michael Appleby		Wellington Central	1	0		
2	Michael Britnell		Christchurch East	2	0		
3	Maki Herbert		Te Tai Tokerau	—	—		
4	Julian Crawford		Dunedin North	5	+1		
5	Jeff Lye		Waitakere	12	+7		
6	Jasmin Hewlett		Mount Roskill	—	—		
7	Emma-Jane Mihaere-Kingi		Te Tai Tonga	—	—		
8	Steven Wilkinson		West Coast-Tasman	7	−1		
9	Richard Goode		Mana	—	—		
10	Fred MacDonald		Ōtaki	20	+10		
11	Leo Biggs		North Shore	—	—		
12	Jay Fitton		Coromandel	—	—		
13	Romana Manning		Tukituki	—	—		
14	Geoff McTague		Wigram	—	—		
15	Jamie Dombroski		Taranaki-King Country	—	—		
16	Christine Mitchell			—	—		
17	Dwayne Sherwood			—	—		
18	Abe Gray			—	—		
19	Sean Norris		New Lynn	—	—		
20	Adrian McDermott		Helensville	—	—		
21	Philip Pophristoff			21	0		
22	Neville Yates			16	−6		
23	Mark Bradford			19	−4		
24	Blair Anderson			—	—		
25	Kevin O'Connell			4	−21		
26	Paula Lambert			3	−23		
27	Irinka Britnell			6	−21		
28	Paul McMullan			11	−17		

=== Democrats for Social Credit ===
The Democratic Party for Social Credit released a party list of twenty-four people on 21 October.

Rank	Name	Incumbency	Contesting electorate	Previous rank	Change	Initial results	Later changes
1	Stephnie de Ruyter		Invercargill	1	0		
2	John Pemberton		Waikato	2	0		
3	Warren Voight		Dunedin South	—	—		
4	Katherine Ransom		Tauranga	4	0		
5	Carolyn McKenzie		Hamilton East	5	0		
6	Hessel van Wieren		Waitaki	8	+2		
7	Heather Smith		Whanganui	7	0		
8	Jeremy Noble		Dunedin North	—	—		
9	Barry Pulford		Tukituki	9	0		
10	John McCaskey		Kaikōura	14	+4		
11	Huia Mitchell		Hunua	—	—		
12	Ken Goodhue		Whangarei	13	+1		
13	Les Port		Hamilton West	16	+3		
14	Robert Mills		Clutha-Southland	—	—		
15	Harry Alchin-Smith			27	+12		
16	Errol Baird			—	—		
17	Peter Adcock-White			—	—		
18	John Ring			15	−3		
19	Kelly Balsom			—	—		
20	David Espin			20	0		
21	Ross Hayward			21	0		
22	Gary Gribben			30	+8		
23	Ron England			—	—		
24	David Tranter			6	−18		

=== Libertarianz ===
Libertarianz has announced a party list of twenty-seven people.

Rank	Name	Incumbency	Contesting electorate	Previous rank	Change	Initial results	Later changes
1	Richard McGrath		Wairarapa	2	+1		
2	Sean Fitzpatrick		Ōhariu	16	+14		
3	Peter Cresswell			6	+3		
4	Reagan Cutting		Wellington Central	—	—		
5	Peter Osborne		Waitakere	15	+10		
6	Michael Murphy		North Shore	14	+8		
7	Shane Pleasance		Invercargill	20	+13		
8	Robert Palmer			21	+13		
9	Bernard Darnton			1	−8		
10	Helen Hughes		Whangarei	13	+3		
11	Colin Cross			5	−6		
12	Nik Haden			9	−3		
13	Luke Howison			18	+5		
14	Phil Howison			8	−6		
15	Andrew Couper			30	+15		
16	Mike Webber			11	−5		
17	Bruce Whitehead			23	+6		
18	Donald Rowberry			31	+13		
19	Ken Riddle			25	+6		
20	Peter Linton		Northcote	7	−13		
21	Allan Munro			—	—		
22	Ian Hayes		Kaikōura	—	—		
23	Shirley Riddle			22	−1		
24	Callum McPetrie			—	—		
25	Elahrairah Zamora			12	−13		
26	Euan McPetrie			27	+1		
27	Mitch Lees			4	−23		

=== Alliance ===
The Alliance party list consists of fourteen people.

Rank	Name	Incumbency	Contesting electorate	Previous rank	Change	Initial results	Later changes
1	Kay Murray		Dunedin South	1	0		
2	Andrew McKenzie			2	0		
3	Kevin Campbell	(Former MP)	Wigram	—	—		
4	Jim Flynn			8	+4		
5	Paul Piesse			4	−1		
6	Victor Billot		Dunedin North	3	−3		
7	Mary O'Neill		Napier	—	—		
8	Kelly Buchanan		Wellington Central	15	+7		
9	Robert van Ruyssevelt			7	−2		
10	Jen Olsen			16	+6		
11	Tom Dowie			13	+2		
12	Thomas O'Neill			14	+2		
13	Eunice Billot			—	—		
14	Norman MacRitchie			20	+6		
