= W. David McIntyre =

New Zealand historian (1932–2022)

David McIntyre OBE
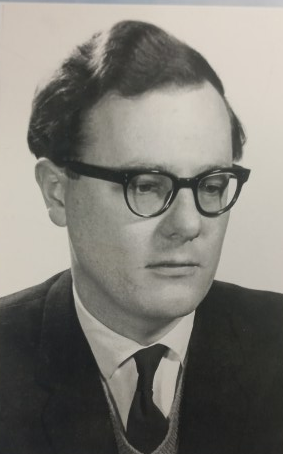
- McIntyre, c. 1960
- Born: William David McIntyre; 4 September 1932; Hucknall, England
- Died: 11 September 2022 (aged 90); Lower Hutt, New Zealand

Academic background
- Education: University of London
- Thesis: British policy in west Africa, the Malay peninsula and the south Pacific during the secretaryships of Lord Kimberley and Lord Carnarvon 1870–1876 (1959)

Academic work
- Discipline: History
- Institutions: University of Nottingham; University of Canterbury
- Notable students: Allan Peachey
- Main interests: British Empire / Commonwealth constitutional and military history

William David McIntyre OBE (4 September 1932 – 11 September 2022) was a British-born New Zealand historian, known for his expertise on the military and constitutional histories of the Commonwealth of Nations and British Empire.

== Early life and family ==
Born in England on 4 September 1932, McIntyre was the son of Rev. J. McIntyre, a congregationalist minister. He was educated at Caterham School and went on to study at Peterhouse, Cambridge, and the University of Washington, earning a Master of Arts degree, and the School of Oriental & African Studies at the University of London, where he completed a PhD. His 1959 doctoral thesis was titled British policy in west Africa, the Malay peninsula and the south Pacific during the secretaryships of Lord Kimberley and Lord Carnarvon 1870–1876.

In 1957, McIntyre married Marion Jean Hillyard, an American he met while at the University of Washington, and they went on to have five children.

== Career ==
McIntyre was a teaching fellow at the University of Washington from 1955 to 1956. After completing his PhD, in 1959 he became an assistant lecturer, and later lecturer, in Commonwealth and American history at the University of Nottingham. In 1966, he was appointed a professor in history at the University of Canterbury, in Christchurch, New Zealand, where he remained for the rest of his career. A notable student of McIntyre at Canterbury was politician Allan Peachey. He retired in 1997, and was awarded the title of professor emeritus. He continued to write and research. An expert on the constitutional and military histories of the Commonwealth of Nations and British Empire, McIntyre published and advised governments. He served as consultant to the Committee on Commonwealth Membership, and compiled its report which was accepted by Heads of Government at Kampala in 2007.

In the 1992 Queen's Birthday Honours, McIntyre was appointed an Officer of the Order of the British Empire, for services to historical research.

== Later life and death ==
McIntyre married his second wife in 1993. He died in Lower Hutt on 11 September 2022, aged 90 years.

== Works ==
=== Books written ===
- 1966: Colonies into Commonwealth
- 1967: The Imperial Frontier in the Tropics, 1865–75
- 1969: Neutrality, Non-alignment, and New Zealand
- 1969: Britain, New Zealand and the Security of South-East Asia in the 1970s
- 1970: Britain and the Commonwealth since 1907
- 1973: The Commonwealth: Its past, present, and future
- 1977: The Commonwealth of Nations: Origins and impact, 1869–1971
- 1979: The Rise and Fall of Singapore Naval Base, 1919–42
- 1988: New Zealand Prepares for War: Defence Policy 1919–39
- 1991: The Significance of the Commonwealth, 1965-90
- 1995: Background to the ANZUS Pact: Policy-making, strategy, and diplomacy, 1945–55
- 1998: British Decolonization, 1946–1997: When, why, and how did the British Empire fall?
- 2001: A Guide to the Contemporary Commonwealth
- 2002: When, if ever, did New Zealand become Independent?
- 2006: Shifting starr: A Presbyterian drama: St Andrew's at Rangi Ruru 1956-2006
- 2007: Dominion of New Zealand: Statesmen and status, 1907-1945
- 2009: The Britannic vision: historians and the making of the British Commonwealth of nations, 1907-48
- 2014: Winding up the British Empire in the Pacific Islands

=== Books edited ===
- 1971: Speeches and Documents on New Zealand History
- 1980: The Journal of Henry Sewell, 1853–7
