= Clem Simich =

New Zealand politician

The Honourable Clem Simich QSO
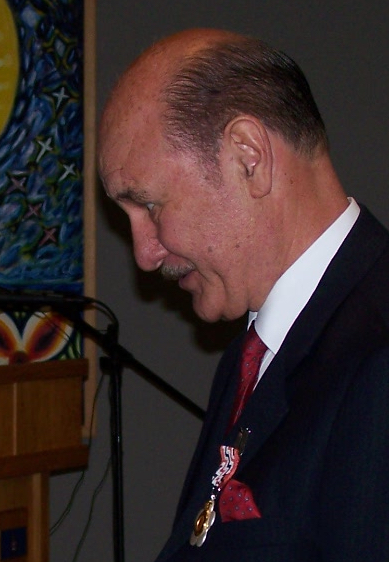
- Simich in 2009

Member of the New Zealand Parliament for Tāmaki
- In office 1992–2005
- Preceded by: Sir Robert Muldoon
- Succeeded by: Allan Peachey

Member of the New Zealand Parliament for National Party list
- In office 2005–2008

Personal details
- Born: 2 June 1939 (age 87) Te Kōpuru, New Zealand
- Party: National

Clement Rudolph "Clem" Simich or Šimić QSO (born 2 June 1939) is a New Zealand politician for the National Party.

== Early life ==
Simich was born in Te Kōpuru, Northland in 1939.

== Member of Parliament ==
New Zealand Parliament
Years	Term	Electorate	List	Party
1992–1993	43rd	Tāmaki		National
1993–1996	44th	Tāmaki		National
1996–1999	45th	Tāmaki	42	National
1999–2002	46th	Tāmaki	none	National
2002–2005	47th	Tāmaki	none	National
2005–2008	48th	List	18	National

He was first elected to Parliament in the 1992 by-election in Tamaki, which followed the retirement of former Prime Minister Robert Muldoon. He remained as MP for Tamaki until 2005, when he made way for Allan Peachey in Tamaki, and stood as the National candidate for Mangere instead. He became a list MP, having not succeeded in winning the Labour safe seat.

In August 1998, he was appointed to Cabinet, being Minister of Police, Minister of Racing, and Minister in Charge of the Audit Department. He also became Minister of Corrections in January 1999. He lost his ministerial positions, however, when National lost the 1999 election.

Simich served as Assistant Speaker of the House between 2002 and 2005. On the retirement of Jonathan Hunt, Simich stood for election as Speaker, but was defeated by Labour's Margaret Wilson.

Simich became the Deputy Speaker of the House after the 2005 election.

He retired from parliament in 2008, before that year's general election.

Simich is of Croatian (in Croatian the surname is Šimić) and also Māori descent.

New Zealand Parliament
Preceded by Sir Robert Muldoon	Member of Parliament for Tāmaki; 1992-2005	Succeeded by Allan Peachey
Political offices
Preceded by Jack Elder	Minister of Police; 1998–1999	Succeeded by George Hawkins
Preceded by Nick Smith	Minister of Corrections; 1999	Succeeded by Matt Robson
