= New Zealand Women's Political Party =

Women's Political Party
- Founded: March 1982
- Ideology: Feminism

The New Zealand Women's Political Party was a feminist political party in New Zealand that is now defunct. It was founded in 1982, with the goal of standing candidates in every electorate and advocating for women's issues.

== History ==
The party was formed in March 1982 at a one-day seminar organised by the collective which ran Broadsheet, a feminist magazine. Sandi Hall, a spokeswoman for the party, said that although men would not be excluded from membership they would not be able to hold office which did not infringe the Human Rights Commission Act 1977 as while under the act it was illegal to discriminate against people on grounds of race, sex or religion it only applied in certain areas and political activity was not such an area.

The 1984 snap general election, held with only a month's notice, was unexpected for the party. The party ultimately only ran 3 candidates in that election — Lyn Cotman in Auckland Central, Christine Corker in Kaipara, and Sandi Hall in Tamaki. The party only won 442 votes (0.02%), winning 253 votes (1.26%) in Auckland Central, 100 votes (0.49%) in Kaipara, and 89 votes (0.40%) in Tamaki.

In an interview of the party's candidates with feminist magazine Broadsheet after the 1984 election, Sandi Hall told Helen Watson that the party operated from feminist principles. In regards to other policies, Hall said that the party viewed ANZUS as a "military protection pact", which they would discard, and instead turn New Zealand into a global mediator of disputes between countries. In the same interview, Christine Corker, when asked if the party had any effect on the victorious Labour Party's policies, said that her Kaipara candidacy had an effect on the rhetoric of other candidates in the seat, saying that the Labour candidate held an event on women's issues, and the NZ Party candidate took out local ads directed at women.

The party did not contest the 1987 election or any future election, and is currently defunct.
