= Eye to Eye with Willie Jackson =

New Zealand current affairs programme

- Also known as: Eye to Eye
- Genre: Current affairs
- Presented by: Willie Jackson
- Country of origin: New Zealand
- Original language: English
- No. of series: 8

Production
- Executive producer: Claudette Hauiti
- Running time: 60 minutes
- Production company: Front of the Box Productions

Original release
- Network: TV One
- Release: 29 May 2004 – 3 May 2009

Eye to Eye with Willie Jackson, or more simply Eye to Eye, is a New Zealand current affairs programme on TV One which looks at the main events from a Māori point of view.

Willie Jackson, or back up presenter Claudette Hauiti, had both an interviewee and panellists; both were usually prominent Māori people.

The show was discontinued in 2009 by TVNZ amid funding changes.
