= Claudette Hauiti =

New Zealand politician

Member of the New Zealand Parliament for National party list
- In office 28 May 2013 – 20 September 2014
- Preceded by: Aaron Gilmore (Note: Normally, list MPs do not have individual predecessors or successors, but Gilmore resigned during a sitting parliament and therefore was succeeded by Hauiti.)

Personal details
- Born: 8 May 1961 (age 65) Auckland, New Zealand
- Party: National Party
- Spouse: Nadine Mau
- Children: 3
- Education: Canberra College of Advanced Education
- Occupation: Broadcaster

Claudette Hauiti (born 8 May 1961) is a New Zealand journalist, broadcaster and political commentator. She was the producer of the award winning programme Children of the Revolution. Hauiti was a New Zealand politician and member of the House of Representatives in 2013 and 2014 as a member of the National Party.

== Early life ==
Hauiti was born on 8 May 1961 in the St Helens Hospital in Auckland. She grew up in the suburb of Mount Roskill and attended Mount Roskill Grammar School. She received a Bachelor of Arts from the Canberra College of Advanced Education. Her father died when she was 16 years old.

== Broadcasting career ==
In 1993 Hauiti founded Front of the Box, a television production company specialising in Māori and Pasifika programming. Through this company Hauiti was the executive producer and presenter on Eye to Eye with Willie Jackson that ran from 2004 to 2009.

In the 2002 TV Guide NZ Television Awards she won the Best Entertainment Series award for Polyfest 2001. She also produced the documentary Children of the Revolution, which won the Best Maori Language Programme award at the 2008 Qantas Film and Television Awards. Children of the Revolution is about protest movements New Zealand in the 1970s and 1980s, directed by Makerita Urale.

Prior to becoming an MP, she held several high-profile roles, including deputy chair at Auckland's Museum of Transport and Technology, and strategy roles with Ngāti Te Ata and an iwi radio station.

Hauiti is a journalist for Radio Waatea and is the station's Parliamentary Press Gallery reporter.

In 2022 Hauiti was a competition judge for the New Zealand International Film Festival.

== Political career ==
New Zealand Parliament
| Years | Term | Electorate | List | Party |
|---|---|---|---|---|
| 2013–2014 | 50th | List | 63 | National |

During the 2010 Auckland local elections, Hauiti stood for the Albert-Eden Local Board in the Owairaka Subdivision. Representing Citizens & Ratepayers, she was not elected.

Hauiti stood in the Māngere electorate during the 2011 general election representing National, losing to Labour's William Sio.

Following Aaron Gilmore's resignation, Hauiti replaced him as a list MP on 28 May 2013.

In March 2014 she returned her parliamentary charge card to Parliamentary Services, after using it to pay for a Christmas trip to Australia. In April 2014 she breached parliament rules by employing her wife as an assistant in her electorate office. She said she was unaware of the rule and immediately terminated the employment after being made aware.

Hauiti announced her resignation from politics on 22 July 2014, after having already been selected as the candidate for Kelston in the upcoming election. She was replaced by Chris Penk as National's Kelston candidate.

=== Post-parliament ===
In December 2014 and again in January 2015 Hauiti re-appeared in media when she was found to have spent approximately $23,000 on MP's expenses despite her known decision to stand down. Her second media appearance came when her sister had an employment-related dispute with Raukawa FM, a station formerly run by Hauiti as Strategic Advisor.

== Personal life ==
Hauiti is Māori, of Ngāti Porou, Te Whānau-ā-Apanui, Ngāpuhi, Ngāti Kuta and Ngāti Ruanui descent. She is a lesbian and entered a civil union with her partner Nadine Mau in 2007. They have three children. She is a Christian.
