= Aaron Gilmore =

New Zealand politician (born 1973)

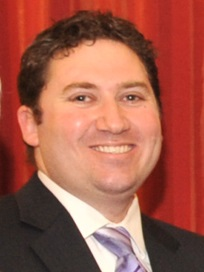

Member of the New Zealand Parliament for National Party list
- In office 8 November 2008 – 26 November 2011
- In office 15 February 2013 – 27 May 2013
- Preceded by: Lockwood Smith (Note: Normally, list MPs do not have individual predecessors or successors, but Smith resigned during a sitting parliament and therefore was succeeded by Gilmore, who later resigned himself and was succeeded by Hauiti.)
- Succeeded by: Claudette Hauiti

Personal details
- Born: 26 August 1973 (age 53) Christchurch, New Zealand
- Party: National
- Profession: Company manager

Aaron Wayne Gilmore (born 26 August 1973) is a New Zealand former politician and member of the New Zealand National Party. He was a list MP from the 2008 election until the 2011 election and again from February to May 2013.

== Early years ==
Gilmore was born in Christchurch to shopkeeper parents and attended Parkview Primary School, in the Christchurch suburb of Parklands. He attended Shirley Boys' High School, before attending the University of Canterbury where he gained a Master of Commerce degree in Economics in 1995.

Gilmore began his career working as an analyst with the Ministry of Transport in Wellington in 1995. The following year he began working at the Department of Treasury at the Crown Companies Monitoring Advisory Unit as an advisor on state owned enterprise privatisation. In 1997 Gilmore worked on secondment to SOE Minister Tony Ryall, where he advised on the sale of state owned enterprises.

Gilmore left the public service in 1999 to join Ernst and Young, where he worked on international projects advising utility companies. In 2001 he joined Cameron and Partners in a similar role before returning to Ernst and Young in Christchurch as a senior manager in 2004. In 2005 Gilmore worked as Corporate Development Manager at General Cable, until selection as a National Party candidate.

== Member of Parliament ==
New Zealand Parliament
| Years | Term | Electorate | List | Party |
|---|---|---|---|---|
| 2008–2011 | 49th | List | 56 | National |
| Feb–May 2013 | 50th | List | 53 | National |

=== First period in Parliament, 2008–2011 ===
Gilmore was selected by the National Party Christchurch East local electorate as its candidate in the safe Labour seat of Christchurch East at the end of 2007. In August 2008 the National Party announced that he would be placed at number 56 on the National Party list. Gilmore came second in the electorate race, losing to the incumbent, Lianne Dalziel, by 5,765 votes, but achieved a record for National in the area of over 12,000 party and personal votes.

Gilmore's curriculum vitae posted on the Parliament web page until 2010 listed him as a member of the Chartered Financial Analyst (CFA) Institute, a position he never had, although he had been a provisional member. He attributed the error to the Parliamentary Service, but a spokesman said "biographical information about MPs published on its website was supplied by them and approved by them as correct". The same online CV by Parliamentary Services contained other inaccuracies, including that Gilmore was married at the time.

In the 2011 election, he again contested Christchurch East and was 53rd on the party list. He again placed second in the electorate behind Dalziel, and on election night results was set to be returned to parliament via the list, the last-placed candidate to be returned. However, with the counting of special votes and the release of official results, National lost a seat to the Green Party so Gilmore was not returned.

=== Second period in Parliament, 2013 ===
In early 2013, Lockwood Smith was appointed as High Commissioner of New Zealand to the United Kingdom and resigned from Parliament. Gilmore was the highest person on National's party list not already in Parliament, and so he replaced Smith and became an MP again.

Emails were released under the Official Information Act in May 2013 from his time as a contractor to the Ministry of Business, Innovation and Employment (MBIE) in November 2012, just prior to his return to Parliament in 2013. The emails contained comments to a Treasury Manager during an argument in which Gilmore said, after noting he may be returning to Parliament as a government member, "I am sure this sort of thing will come back to haunt you if you want your career to reach its full potential." The emails were described as "inappropriate" by the Ministry and the Ministry. TV3 had asked Gilmore specifically, in a previously broadcast segment, whether there had been any complaints about his time at MBIE, and Gilmore had replied on camera that there was nothing that had been brought to his attention.

=== Departure from Parliament ===
Gilmore announced his resignation from Parliament on 12 May 2013, following a public scandal involving a restaurant in Hanmer Springs, in which it is "alleged Gilmore asked the barman (who had declined to sell him more alcohol) 'Do you know who I am?' and threatened to have Prime Minister John Key intervene to have him sacked." Gilmore's resignation followed pressure from senior Ministers and the revelation that he had misled the Prime Minister. He gave his valedictory speech two days later. His membership of Parliament ceased on 27 May, and his committee memberships (Maori Affairs, and Local Government and Environment) a day later. He was replaced by Claudette Hauiti.

== After Parliament ==
Gilmore runs a private property investment company, The Mighty Rocket Group, later renamed St Pauls Asset Management. Amanda High, a former employee of The Mighty Rocket Group, took the company to the Employment Relations Authority in 2018 to enforce payment of a settlement agreed in an employment dispute. Gilmore had disputed High's complaint.

In December 2021 Gilmore was ordered to pay NZ$11,000 in costs after a failed attempt to enforce a statutory demand against Mighty Rocket's landlord over the termination of its lease. In March 2022, he was taken to court by his parents over an unpaid loan worth more than $250,000.

In July 2022 Gilmore ran for the Wellington City Council in the Eastern Ward at the 2022 local government elections. After announcing his candidacy, Gilmore's parents commented that he needed to "pay his bills" before he seeks a seat on Wellington City Council, in reference to his unpaid debts that he owes them. According to preliminary results, he came ninth out of ten candidates and did not win a place on the council.
