= Tāmaki (electorate) =

- Single-member general constituency for the New Zealand House of Representatives
- Interactive map of boundaries from the 2026 election
- Formation: 1946
- Region: Auckland
- Character: Urban and suburban
- Term: 3 years

Member for Tāmaki
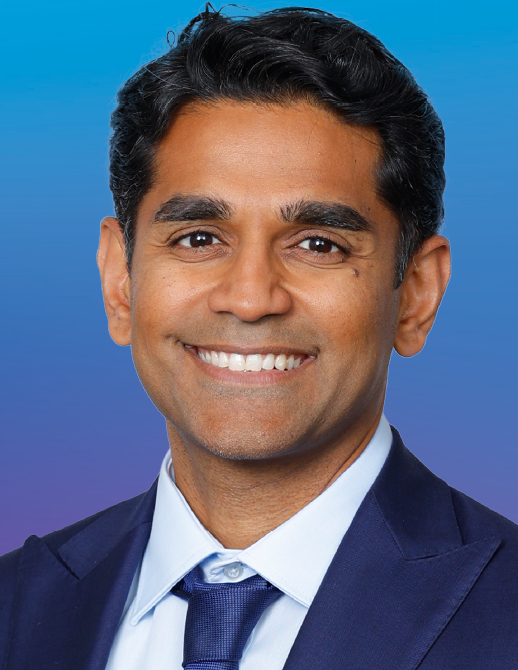
- Mahesh Muralidhar since 7 November 2026
- Party: National
- Previous MP: Simon O'Connor (National)
Party vote distribution

Tāmaki is a parliamentary electorate, returning one Member of Parliament to the New Zealand House of Representatives. The electorate is named after the Tāmaki River that runs immediately east of the seat. The electorate is represented by Mahesh Muralidhar, a member of the National party.

== Population centres ==
The 1941 New Zealand census had been postponed due to World War II, so the 1946 electoral redistribution had to take ten years of population growth and movements into account. The North Island gained a further two electorates from the South Island due to faster population growth. The abolition of the country quota through the Electoral Amendment Act, 1945 reduced the number and increased the size of rural electorates. None of the existing electorates remained unchanged, 27 electorates were abolished, eight former electorates were re-established, and 19 electorates were created for the first time, including Tamaki.

Tāmaki is based around the Auckland isthmus north-eastern beach suburbs, Mission Bay, Meadowbank, Saint Heliers, Kohimarama, Ōrākei and Glendowie; it also contains the suburbs of Glen Innes and Stonefields on its southern fringe. At the 2025 boundary review, the electorate would gain Point England from Panmure-Ōtāhuhu.

Tāmaki is the home of a selection of New Zealand's emblematic historical moments: Ngāti Whatua activism at Bastion Point (sparking a chain of events leading to the modern Treaty of Waitangi grievance settlement process) occurred inside the seat's boundaries, a seat at the time represented by the contentious Robert Muldoon, the Prime Minister responsible for the Crown's response to the occupation of Bastion Point. Among other Ngāti Whatua land taken through governmental application of public works legislation is Paratai Drive, once New Zealand's most expensive street. The area around Mission Bay is also home to the Savage Memorial, a huge site dedicated to the memory of former Labour Michael Joseph Savage, architect of the welfare state in New Zealand.

== History ==
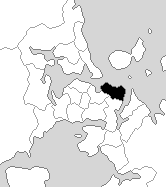
Tamaki boundaries from 1987 to 1993

Map of boundaries at the 2020 and 2023 general elections

The National Party held Tāmaki in all its various incarnations from 1960 until 2023, their domination beginning when future Prime Minister Robert Muldoon (later Sir Robert) began his parliamentary career by ousting the Labour Party's Bob Tizard. Muldoon remained firmly in place until his self-selected departure from parliament at the end of 1991. In four elections (1972, 1975, 1978 and 1981) Bill Andersen of the Socialist Unity Party ran against him, receiving between 39 and 188 votes.

Muldoon's departure caused a by-election in 1992, where candidate Clem Simich won despite fierce competition in an environment where both major parties were out of favour with the electorate. Simich gave up his seat ahead of the 2005 election to high school principal Allan Peachey. Simich was returned to parliament from his party's list, having chosen to move from standing for one of his party's safest seats to instead contest Māngere, easily Labour's safest seat. From 2005, Tāmaki was represented by Allan Peachey, who announced his retirement at the end of the parliamentary term in 2011 for health reasons, and subsequently died shortly before the election. Simon O'Connor was chosen by the National Party to contest the electorate in the 2011 general election.

O'Connor won the seat comfortably in the general elections held in 2011, 2014, 2017 and 2020 but later stirred controversy with his conservative views. O'Connor was one of only eight members of parliament to vote against the Conversion Practices Prohibition Legislation Act 2022, published a Facebook post welcoming the United States Supreme Court's overturning of Roe v. Wade and made comments in Parliament that linked a mass shooting in the US to remarks that Marama Davidson, co-leader of the Greens, had made about white cisgender men. In response to O'Connor's controversial views several Tāmaki residents called for O'Connor to resign as their Member of Parliament, and he faced ultimately unsuccessful challenges to his candidacy for the National Party in the lead up to the 2023 general election.

Brook van Velden of the ACT New Zealand party subsequently won the seat in the 2023 general election, ending the six-decade reign of the National Party.

=== Members of Parliament ===
Unless otherwise stated, all MPs terms began and ended at general elections.

Key

Labour National ACT NZ First

Election	Winner
1946 election	Tom Skinner
1949 election	Eric Halstead
1951 election	Eric Halstead
1954 election	Eric Halstead
1957 election	Bob Tizard
1960 election	Robert Muldoon^{1}
1963 election	Robert Muldoon^{1}
1966 election	Robert Muldoon^{1}
1969 election	Robert Muldoon^{1}
1972 election	Robert Muldoon^{1}
1975 election	Robert Muldoon^{1}
1978 election	Robert Muldoon^{1}
1981 election	Robert Muldoon^{1}
1984 election	Robert Muldoon^{1}
1987 election	Robert Muldoon^{1}
1990 election	Robert Muldoon^{1}
1992 by-election	Clem Simich
1993 election	Clem Simich
1996 election	Clem Simich
1999 election	Clem Simich
2002 election	Clem Simich
2005 election	Allan Peachey^{2}
2008 election	Allan Peachey^{2}
2011 election	Simon O'Connor
2014 election	Simon O'Connor
2017 election	Simon O'Connor
2020 election	Simon O'Connor
2023 election	Brooke van Velden
2026 election	Mahesh Muralidhar

^{1}Robert Muldoon resigned effective December 1991
^{2}Allan Peachey announced that, due to his ill-health he would retire at the 2011 election, but he died twenty days before election day

=== List MPs ===
Members of Parliament elected from party lists in elections where that person also unsuccessfully contested the Tāmaki electorate. Unless otherwise stated, all MPs terms began and ended at general elections.

Election	Winner
1996 election	Jonathan Hunt
1996 election	Patricia Schnauer
2002 election	Ken Shirley
2017 election	Jenny Marcroft

== Election results ==
=== 2026 election ===
The next election will be held on 7 November 2026. Candidates for Tāmaki are listed at Candidates in the 2026 New Zealand general election by electorate § Tāmaki. Official results will be available after 27 November 2026.

=== 2023 election ===
2023 general election: Tāmaki
Notes:	Blue background denotes the winner of the electorate vote. Pink background denotes a candidate elected from their party list. Yellow background denotes an electorate win by a list member, or other incumbent. A ✓ or ✗ denotes status of any incumbent, win or lose respectively.						
Party	Candidate	Votes	%	±%	Party votes	%	±%
ACT	Brooke van Velden	17,858	43.19	+38.01	5,172	12.36	+0.68
National	✗ Simon O'Connor	13,700	33.13	−18.60	21,916	52.41	+15.54
Labour	Fesaitu Solomone	8,968	21.69	−10.60	7,009	16.76	−21.66
NZ Loyal	Anne Perratt	389	0.94	–	167	0.39	–
Green					4,582	10.95	+3.00
NZ First					1,198	2.86	+1.25
Opportunities					980	2.34	+1.01
Te Pāti Māori					288	0.68	+0.38
Legalise Cannabis					88	0.21	+0.07
NewZeal					82	0.19	+0.12
Animal Justice					51	0.12	–
Freedoms NZ					47	0.11	–
DemocracyNZ					34	0.08	–
New Conservatives					29	0.06	−0.62
Women's Rights					28	0.06	–
Leighton Baker Party					6	0.01	–
New Nation					6	0.01	–
Informal votes		430			128		
Total valid votes		41,345			41,811		
ACT gain from National	Majority	4,158	10.05	−9.39			

=== 2020 election ===
2020 general election: Tāmaki
Notes:	Blue background denotes the winner of the electorate vote. Pink background denotes a candidate elected from their party list. Yellow background denotes an electorate win by a list member, or other incumbent. A ✓ or ✗ denotes status of any incumbent, win or lose respectively.						
Party	Candidate	Votes	%	±%	Party votes	%	±%
National	✓ Simon O'Connor	21,471	51.73	−11.77	15,435	36.87	−24.66
Labour	Shirin Brown	13,403	32.29	+9.50	16,082	38.42	+14.01
Green	Sylvia Boys	3,260	7.85	+1.07	3,200	7.65	+2.01
ACT	Carmel Claridge	2,151	5.18	+3.79	4,887	11.68	+10.52
New Conservative	Paul Sommer	246	0.59	–	286	0.68	+0.57
Advance NZ	Sarai Tepou	180	0.43	–	178	0.43	–
NZ First					673	1.61	−2.28
Opportunities					558	1.33	−0.72
Māori Party					127	0.30	−0.15
TEA					62	0.15	–
Legalise Cannabis					60	0.14	+0.01
Sustainable NZ					32	0.08	–
ONE					31	0.07	–
Outdoors					16	0.04	+0.03
Vision New Zealand					16	0.04	+0.02
Social Credit					6	0.01	+0.00
Heartland					4	0.01	–
Informal votes		794			202		
Total valid votes		41,505			41,855		
National hold	Majority	8,068	19.44	−21.27			

=== 2017 election ===
2017 general election: Tāmaki
Notes:	Blue background denotes the winner of the electorate vote. Pink background denotes a candidate elected from their party list. Yellow background denotes an electorate win by a list member, or other incumbent. A ✓ or ✗ denotes status of any incumbent, win or lose respectively.						
Party	Candidate	Votes	%	±%	Party votes	%	±%
National	✓ Simon O'Connor	24,026	63.50	−6.94	23,628	61.53	−4.03
Labour	Sam McDonald	8,624	22.79	+8.52	9,374	24.41	+9.63
Green	Richard Leckinger	2,567	6.78	−3.42	2,166	5.64	−3.16
NZ First	Jenny Marcroft	1,080	2.85	–	1,497	3.89	−0.52
ACT	Mike Milne	529	1.39	+0.08	524	1.36	−0.01
Māori Party	Mele Pepa	392	1.03	–	174	0.45	−0.03
Independent	Penny Bright	244	0.64	–			
Opportunities					789	2.05	–
Legalise Cannabis					53	0.13	−0.16
Conservative					45	0.11	−2.94
United Future					29	0.07	−0.12
People's Party					11	0.02	–
Ban 1080					8	0.02	+0.00
Mana					7	0.01	−0.71
Democrats					6	0.01	−0.02
Outdoors					6	0.01	–
Internet					2	0.01	−0.71
Informal votes		373			81		
Total valid votes		37,835			38,400		
National hold	Majority	15,402	40.71	−15.71			

=== 2014 election ===
2014 general election: Tāmaki
Notes:	Blue background denotes the winner of the electorate vote. Pink background denotes a candidate elected from their party list. Yellow background denotes an electorate win by a list member, or other incumbent. A ✓ or ✗ denotes status of any incumbent, win or lose respectively.						
Party	Candidate	Votes	%	±%	Party votes	%	±%
National	✓ Simon O'Connor	25,539	69.50	+1.83	24,091	65.56	+1.14
Labour	Chao-Fu Wu	5,118	13.93	−4.28	5,431	14.78	−2.80
Green	Dorthe Siggaard	3,711	10.10	+2.30	3,232	8.80	+0.03
Conservative	Danny Mountain	610	1.66	+0.12	1,122	3.05	+1.53
ACT	Mike Milne	474	1.29	−1.10	504	1.37	−0.99
Mana	Lisa Gibson	302	0.82	+0.82	263	0.72	+0.45
NZ First					1,619	4.41	+0.65
Māori Party					175	0.48	−0.03
Legalise Cannabis					106	0.29	+0.01
United Future					69	0.19	−0.22
Civilian					15	0.04	+0.04
Focus					13	0.04	+0.04
Independent Coalition					12	0.03	+0.03
Democrats					10	0.03	+0.03
Ban 1080					8	0.02	+0.02
Informal votes		438			78		
Total valid votes		36,192			36,748		
National hold	Majority	20,421	56.42	+7.96			

=== 2011 election ===
2011 general election: Tāmaki
Notes:	Blue background denotes the winner of the electorate vote. Pink background denotes a candidate elected from their party list. Yellow background denotes an electorate win by a list member, or other incumbent. A ✓ or ✗ denotes status of any incumbent, win or lose respectively.						
Party	Candidate	Votes	%	±%	Party votes	%	±%
National	Simon O'Connor	24,837	67.67	+1.93	24,338	64.42	+4.19
Labour	Nick Iusitini Bakulich	7,051	19.21	−1.53	6,642	17.58	−3.58
Green	Richard Leckinger	2,861	7.80	+1.94	3,314	8.77	+3.48
ACT	John Boscawen	877	2.39	−2.06	893	2.36	−5.56
Conservative	Litia Simpson	567	1.54	+1.54	575	1.52	+1.52
Independent	Wayne Young	358	0.98	+0.98			
Independent	Stephen Berry	152	0.41	+0.41			
NZ First					1,421	3.76	+1.29
Māori Party					193	0.51	−0.01
United Future					156	0.41	−0.35
Legalise Cannabis					107	0.28	+0.11
Mana					102	0.27	+0.27
Libertarianz					30	0.08	+0.03
Alliance					6	0.02	-0.002
Democrats					5	0.01	+0.01
Informal votes		755			255		
Total valid votes		36,703			37,782		
Turnout		38,037	77.50				
National hold	Majority	17,786	48.46	+3.45			

Electorate (as at 26 November 2011): 49,080

=== 2008 election ===
2008 general election: Tāmaki
Notes:	Blue background denotes the winner of the electorate vote. Pink background denotes a candidate elected from their party list. Yellow background denotes an electorate win by a list member, or other incumbent. A ✓ or ✗ denotes status of any incumbent, win or lose respectively.						
Party	Candidate	Votes	%	±%	Party votes	%	±%
National	✓ Allan Peachey	24,863	65.74		23,205	60.22	
Labour	Josephine Bartley	7,843	20.74		8,152	21.16	
Green	Richard Leckinger	2,216	5.86		2,040	5.29	
ACT	Chris Simmons	1,683	4.45		3,053	7.92	
NZ First	Doug Nabbs	639	1.69		954	2.48	
Progressive	Ralph Taylor	292	0.77		188	0.49	
United Future	Gregory Graydon	282	0.75		294	0.76	
Māori Party					201	0.52	
Bill and Ben					104	0.27	
Pacific					98	0.25	
Kiwi					79	0.21	
Legalise Cannabis					65	0.17	
Family Party					46	0.12	
Libertarianz					20	0.05	
RAM					19	0.05	
Alliance					7	0.02	
Democrats					3	0.01	
RONZ					2	0.01	
Workers Party					2	0.01	
Informal votes		402			152		
Total valid votes		37,818			38,532		
National hold	Majority	17,020					

=== 2005 election ===
2005 general election: Tāmaki
Notes:	Blue background denotes the winner of the electorate vote. Pink background denotes a candidate elected from their party list. Yellow background denotes an electorate win by a list member, or other incumbent. A ✓ or ✗ denotes status of any incumbent, win or lose respectively.						
Party	Candidate	Votes	%	±%	Party votes	%	±%
National	Allan Peachey	20,956	58.00	+22.69	19,829	53.87	
Labour	Leila Boyle	11,446	31.68	+0.09	11,890	32.30	
ACT	Ken Shirley	1,258	3.48		1,009	2.74	
NZ First	Brett Webster	973	2.69		1,393	3.78	
Progressive	Matt Robson	950	2.63		265	0.72	
United Future	Greg Graydon	504	1.39		615	1.67	
Direct Democracy	Grant Burch	45	0.12		6	0.02	
Green					1,423	3.87	
Māori Party					149	0.40	–
Destiny					98	0.27	
Legalise Cannabis					54	0.15	
Christian Heritage					22	0.06	
Family Rights					19	0.05	
Alliance					6	0.05	
Libertarianz					12	0.03	
99 MP					6	0.02	
Democrats					5	0.01	
RONZ					4	0.01	
One NZ					2	0.01	
Informal votes		411			139		
Total valid votes		36,132			36,807		
National hold	Majority	9,510	26.32	+22.61			

=== 1999 election ===
Refer to Candidates in the New Zealand general election 1999 by electorate#Tamaki for a list of candidates.

=== 1993 election ===
1993 general election: Tamaki
Party	Candidate	Votes	%	±%
National	Clem Simich	11,563	55.39	+9.94
Alliance	Richard Green	3,612	17.30	
Labour	Lorraine Wilson	3,300	15.80	
NZ First	Gordon Preston	1,739	8.33	
Christian Heritage	David Lindsay	279	1.33	
McGillicuddy Serious	Marc de Boer	185	0.88	
Natural Law	Warren Stott	75	0.35	
Defence Movement	Bevan Skelton	51	0.24	−0.09
Independent	Bertus Post	37	0.17	
Workers Rights	Carl Adams	32	0.15	
Majority		7,951	38.09	+30.89
Turnout		20,873	86.61	+14.64
Registered electors		24,099		

=== 1992 by-election ===
1992 Tamaki by-election
Party	Candidate	Votes	%	±%
National	Clem Simich	7,901	45.45	−13.47
Alliance	Chris Leitch	6,649	38.25	+21.06^{1}
Labour	Verna Smith	2,121	12.20	−10.03
Christian Heritage	Clive Thomson	199	1.14	
United New Zealand	Tania Harris	118	0.67	
Independent	Dean Lonergan	105	0.60	
McGillicuddy Serious	Adrian Holroyd	73	0.42	
Defence Movement	Bevan Skelton	57	0.33	
Independent	Cliff Emeny	47	0.27	
Blokes Liberation Front	Frank Barker	46	0.26	
Social Credit	Colin Maloney	34	0.20	
Independent	Andrew Aitkenhead	19	0.11	
Independent	Victor Bryers	7	0.04	−0.17
Communist League	James Robb	7	0.04	
Majority		1,252	7.20	
Turnout		17,383	71.97^{2}	−13.68^{2}
National hold		Swing	-29.49	

^{1} Alliance vote increase over 3,556 combined vote for Green Party, New Labour and Democrats in 1990 election.
^{2} Based on 1990 election figures.

=== 1990 election ===
1990 general election: Tamaki
Party	Candidate	Votes	%	±%
National	Robert Muldoon	12,191	58.93	+6.90
Labour	Malcolm Johnston	4,599	22.23	
Green	Richard Green	2,633	12.73	
NewLabour	Bill Logue	789	3.81	
McGillicuddy Serious	Craig Thomas Young	183	0.88	
Democrats	Craig Douglas Thomas	134	0.65	
Social Credit	Charles Thomas Willoughby	67	0.32	
Independent	Matthew Ford Elliot	49	0.23	
Independent	Victor Bryers	44	0.21	
Majority		7,592	36.70	+27.03
Turnout		20,689	85.65	−0.86
Registered electors		24,154		

=== 1987 election ===
1987 general election: Tamaki
Party	Candidate	Votes	%	±%
National	Robert Muldoon	10,466	52.03	+5.68
Labour	Carl Harding	8,519	42.35	
Democrats	Richard John Pittams	668	3.32	
NZ Party	D T Roberts	343	1.70	
Values	Bruce Symondson	119	0.59	
Majority		1,947	9.67	−7.05
Turnout		20,115	84.79	−6.50
Registered electors		23,721		

=== 1984 election ===
1984 general election: Tamaki
Party	Candidate	Votes	%	±%
National	Robert Muldoon	10,414	46.35	−7.16
Labour	Robin Tulloch	6,656	29.62	
NZ Party	John Hodgson	4,545	20.23	
Social Credit	Eddie Hagen	616	2.74	
Values	Brett Cunningham	93	0.41	
Women's	Sandi Hall	89	0.39	
Independent	D B Butler	51	0.22	
Majority		3,758	16.72	−7.16
Turnout		22,464	91.29	+2.73
Registered electors		24,607		

=== 1981 election ===
1981 general election: Tamaki
Party	Candidate	Votes	%	±%
National	Robert Muldoon	11,543	53.51	−3.18
Labour	Richard Northey	6,390	29.62	
Social Credit	John Stevens	3,449	15.98	
Socialist Unity	Bill Andersen	188	0.87	+0.58
Majority		5,153	23.88	−6.40
Turnout		21,570	88.56	+20.23
Registered electors		24,356		

=== 1978 election ===
1978 general election: Tamaki
Party	Candidate	Votes	%	±%
National	Robert Muldoon	11,814	56.69	−5.69
Labour	Audie Cooke-Pennefather	5,504	26.41	
Social Credit	Les Tasker	2,360	11.32	
Values	J Woolnough	791	3.79	
Progressive National	D Harden	276	1.32	
Socialist Unity	Bill Andersen	62	0.29	+0.09
Independent	P T P Grace	22	0.10	
United	A H Greig	8	0.03	
Majority		6,310	30.28	−5.22
Turnout		20,837	68.33	−15.97
Registered electors		30,491		

=== 1975 election ===
1975 general election: Tamaki
Party	Candidate	Votes	%	±%
National	Robert Muldoon	11,836	62.38	+4.61
Labour	Tim Kaye	5,101	26.88	
Values	Brent Impey	1,258	6.63	
Social Credit	David Stevens	725	3.82	
Socialist Unity	Bill Andersen	39	0.20	−0.41
Socialist Party	Ernie Higdon	12	0.06	−0.41
Majority		6,735	35.50	+9.37
Turnout		18,971	84.30	−6.69
Registered electors		22,502		

=== 1972 election ===
1972 general election: Tamaki
Party	Candidate	Votes	%	±%
National	Robert Muldoon	10,146	57.77	−7.37
Labour	Alan Hedger	5,556	31.63	
Values	Brian Jessup	876	4.98	
Social Credit	James Robinson	714	4.06	
Socialist Unity	Bill Andersen	108	0.61	
Socialist Party	Ernie Higdon	83	0.47	
Independent National	George Mullenger	48	0.27	
New Democratic	Ian Upton	31	0.17	
Majority		4,590	26.13	−8.31
Turnout		17,562	90.99	−0.29
Registered electors		19,301		

=== 1969 election ===
1969 general election: Tamaki
Party	Candidate	Votes	%	±%
National	Robert Muldoon	11,513	65.14	+9.77
Labour	Alfred David Bolton	5,425	30.69	
Social Credit	Keith Harold Arthur Branch	496	2.80	−3.37
Independent	Gladys May Thorpy	239	1.35	
Majority		6,088	34.44	+17.52
Turnout		17,673	90.70	+5.06
Registered electors		19,485		

=== 1966 election ===
1966 general election: Tamaki
Party	Candidate	Votes	%	±%
National	Robert Muldoon	9,248	55.37	−3.73
Labour	Kevin Ryan	6,421	38.44	
Social Credit	Keith Harold Arthur Branch	1,032	6.17	
Majority		2,827	16.92	−6.08
Turnout		16,701	85.64	−7.33
Registered electors		19,501		

=== 1963 election ===
1963 general election: Tamaki
Party	Candidate	Votes	%	±%
National	Robert Muldoon	9,645	59.10	+5.52
Labour	Norman Finch	5,891	36.09	
Social Credit	Joseph F. Richards	382	2.34	
Liberal	Robert Arthur Allen	307	1.88	
Communist	Donald McEwan	94	0.57	
Majority		3,754	23.00	+15.96
Turnout		16,319	92.97	+3.12
Registered electors		17,552		

=== 1960 election ===
1960 general election: Tamaki
Party	Candidate	Votes	%	±%
National	Robert Muldoon	8,728	53.58	
Labour	Bob Tizard	7,580	46.54	−4.07
Social Credit	Eric Ernest McGowan	352	2.16	
Communist	Rita Smith	77	0.47	
Majority		1,148	7.04	
Turnout		16,287	89.85	−6.22
Registered electors		18,125		

=== 1957 election ===
1957 general election: Tamaki
Party	Candidate	Votes	%	±%
Labour	Bob Tizard	7,749	50.61	
National	Eric Halstead	7,160	46.76	−6.54
Social Credit	James Norris	400	2.61	
Majority		589	3.84	
Turnout		15,309	96.07	+3.10
Registered electors		15,934		

=== 1954 election ===
1954 general election: Tamaki
Party	Candidate	Votes	%	±%
National	Eric Halstead	8,665	53.30	−0.61
Labour	Pat Curran	6,679	41.09	
Social Credit	Keith Edward Donald Robertson	910	5.59	
Majority		1,986	12.21	+3.93
Turnout		16,254	92.97	+0.73
Registered electors		17,482		

=== 1951 election ===
1951 general election: Tamaki
Party	Candidate	Votes	%	±%
National	Eric Halstead	9,504	53.91	+0.83
Labour	Tom Skinner	8,043	45.62	−0.52
Independent	Ethel Maude Wood	84	0.47	
Majority		1,461	8.28	+1.34
Turnout		17,631	92.24	−3.48
Registered electors		19,113		

=== 1949 election ===
1949 general election: Tamaki
Party	Candidate	Votes	%	±%
National	Eric Halstead	8,364	53.08	
Labour	Tom Skinner	7,269	46.14	−4.73
Ind. Social Credit	Frederick Coles Jordan	123	0.78	
Majority		1,095	6.94	
Turnout		15,756	95.72	+1.15
Registered electors		16,460		

=== 1946 election ===
1946 general election: Tamaki
Party	Candidate	Votes	%	±%
Labour	Tom Skinner	6,781	50.87	
National	John George Concanon Wales	6,550	49.13	
Majority		231	1.73	
Turnout		13,331	94.57	
Registered electors		14,095		
