= Clyde Graf =

New Zealand politician

Waikato regional councillor
- In office 2022–2025
- Constituency: Waipā-King Country
- In office 2013–2016
- Constituency: Thames-Coromandel

Co-leader of the Ban 1080 Party
- In office 20 May 2017 – 28 February 2018 Serving with Bill Wallace
- Preceded by: Mike Downard
- Succeeded by: Party disestablished

Personal details
- Party: Ban 1080 Party
- Other political affiliations: United Future

Clyde Waldemar Graf is a New Zealand politician and anti-1080 activist. He served on the Waikato Regional Council from 2013 to 2016 and from 2022 to 2025.

== Early life ==
In February 1986, Graf and his younger brother Paul were sentenced to ten years in prison for bank robberies committed in Brisbane, Australia. Clyde would rob the banks with an imitation gun and a disguise, while Paul served as the getaway driver. They served two-and-a-half years before completing their sentences on parole.

== Anti-1080 activism ==
In 2008, Graf and his brother Steve, collectively known as The Graf Boys, debuted their first anti-1080 documentary A Shadow of Doubt. They screened it in Carterton to a crowd of about 60. In March 2009, they released Poisoning Paradise. The Department of Conservation (DOC) stated that the film did not raise fresh claims or evidence and that they would continue to use 1080. The film won the NZ Skeptics' Bent Spoon Award, a satirical award given for gullibility or lack of critical thinking on science-related issues. In August, fellow anti-1080 activist Chris Short climbed Mount Tongariro while terminally ill with cancer, refusing to come down until the film was screened on national television. Graf denied having anything to do with Short's protest, and tried to convince him to come down. Short had previously served eight months of a two-year sentence in 1995 after an anti-1080 protest wherein he hijacked a helicopter at gunpoint and made the pilot drop him on Tongariro, where he held crew members hostage for five days. He eventually left the mountain after six days on 30 August, despite not achieving his stated goal, and died of his cancer a year later.

In October 2011, Graf suggested that 1080 drops were responsible for the deaths of 89 kiwi in the Tongariro Forest, leading to the DOC putting out a statement rebutting him.

== Political career ==
In September 2011, Graf was announced as the United Future candidate for Coromandel in the 2011 general election. However, the next month he moved his candidacy to West Coast-Tasman to replace withdrawn candidate Jackie Douglas, while his brother Steve took the Coromandel spot. Graf was placed 11th on the party list. He gained only 1.37% of the electorate vote, and the party gained 0.60% of the party vote, electing no additional MPs besides leader Peter Dunne.

In 2013, Graf was elected to the Waikato Regional Council in the Thames-Coromandel constituency. In early 2016, he was ordered to write two apology letters after breaching the council's code of conduct by writing an article in the Tasmanian Times and a letter to mayors and councillors of the district in which he advocated against 1080. The breaches were for not making it clear that he was writing in a personal capacity rather than representing the council's views. He used his apologies to further advocate against 1080. He lost re-election later that year. In April 2017, he unsuccessfully contested a council by-election in the Hamilton constituency caused by the death of Lois Livingston.

On 20 May 2017, Graf was elected co-leader of the Ban 1080 Party, alongside incumbent co-leader and party founder Bill Wallace. He contested the Coromandel electorate in the 2017 election, receiving 2.05% of the vote. The party gained only 0.12% of the party vote, and was soon deregistered on 28 February 2018.

After a failed attempt to regain his Thames-Coromandel seat on the Waikato Regional Council in 2019, Graf was elected to the Waipā-King Country constituency in 2022. He campaigned against the Three Waters reform programme, and was noted by Stuff as having frequently shared disinformation about the COVID-19 vaccine on social media. He failed to be re-elected in the 2025 regional council election.
