= Christine Rose (politician) =

New Zealand politician

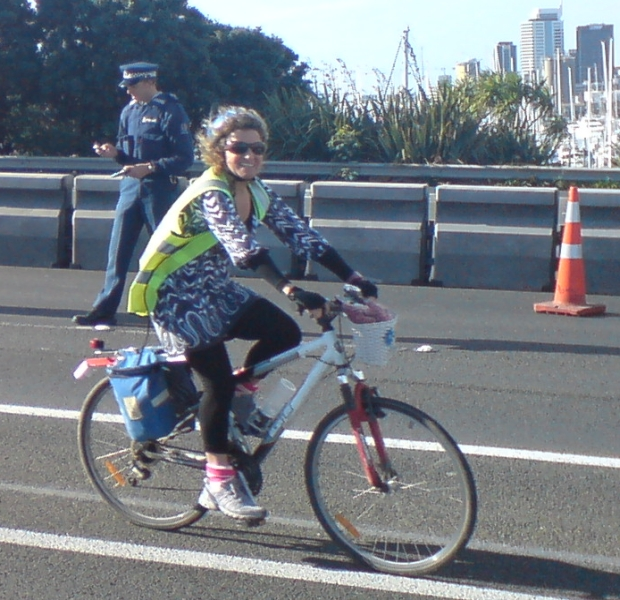
Christine Rose is a known advocate for cycling

Christine Rose is a New Zealand environmental advocate, a former Councillor and Deputy Chair of the Auckland Regional Council. She is an artist and writer.

== Political career ==
=== Auckland ===
Rose was Deputy Mayor of the Rodney District Council and then represented the Rodney constituency in the Auckland Regional Council. She chaired the Regional Council's transport and urban development committee, the top transport decision-making body of the council.

She ran for election for the Rodney seat in the first "Supercity" Auckland Council election. Rose lost this election to former Rodney mayor Penny Webster. Rose stood in the Rodney electorate for Labour at the 2011 General election. She stood as a candidate in the 2013 elections, for the post of one of Auckland Council's Waitākere Ward Council seats but failed to be elected despite an endorsement from retiring councillor Sandra Coney.

Rose has published both academic and environmental writing in local newspapers and online platforms. She has led regional and national campaigns to protect the critically endangered Maui's and Hector's dolphins from human induced threats, particularly set-nets, and pollution. Rose also campaigns to protect whales and their habitat. Since 2020 she has organised, through her Facebook group, the country's first nationwide Citizen Science Cetacean Census.

Rose worked as lead Agriculture and Climate Campaigner for Greenpeace Aotearoa from 2021 to December 2024.

She founded and chairs the Māui and Hector's Dolphin Defenders charity which campaigns for the protection of the critically endangered Māui dolphin and endangered Hector's dolphin from trawl and set nets. She has a BA in philosophy, and politics with First Class Honours, and has done five years PhD study in Local Government Politics.
