= Allan Birchfield =

New Zealand local politician, coal and gold miner

Chairperson of West Coast Regional Council
- In office 2019–2023

Personal details
- Born: 1949 or 1950 (age 75–76); New Zealand
- Profession: Coal and gold miner

Allan John Birchfield (born 1949/1950) is a coal and gold miner from the South Island's West Coast of New Zealand. He is a West Coast Regional Councillor who served as chairperson from 2019 to 2023. He is known for his climate change denial.

== Family and mining career ==
Birchfield's family has a long history of coal and gold mining and sawmilling on the West Coast. His father was Maxwell John Birchfield (1923–1990). Birchfield farms land at Ngahere, works an alluvial gold claim near Hokitika, and is director of Birchfield Coal Mines Ltd, owned with his three siblings. Birchfield Coal Mines, started by Birchfield's parents in 1977, employs 20 people at a mine near Reefton, and in 2016 bought the Liverpool and Strongman mines from bankrupt mining company Solid Energy.

Birchfield is the owner of the Kanieri, the last gold dredge operating on the West Coast and the largest remaining alluvial bucket gold dredge in the world. The 3,500 tonnes (3,900 tons) dredge was built in 1938 to work the Kaniere area, and recovered 175,000 ounces (5,000 kg) of gold from around Hokitika and 202,000 ounces (5,700 kg) from the Taramakau River before stopping operation in 1978. It was salvaged and rebuilt by US company R.A. Hanson Co. (also known as RAHCO) in 1989, who went into receivership eight months later. The dredge was purchased by Birchfield Minerals in August 1992 and ran at Ngahere, 22 kilometres (14 mi) inland from Greymouth, until 2004 before being mothballed as unprofitable.

It restarted operation in 2009 with a NZ$2.2 million loan from Development West Coast, mining the Grey River flats near Blackball and ran until 2012, when falling gold prices and resource consents led to it being mothballed again. In 2013 Birchfield successfully defended eight charges by the Department of Conservation of undertaking commercial gold mining without authority and damaging conservation land at Blackball and the Grey River. In 2016, then 65, he announced he was retiring from gold mining and put the dredge up for sale, but it remains in storage at his Ngahere property. He continues to work an alluvial gold claim south of Greymouth and in the COVID-19 pandemic in 2020 he argued gold mining should continue as an essential service. He petitioned then-Conservation Minister Eugenie Sage to allow alluvial gold mining on Department of Conservation land.

== Local government career ==
Birchfield was elected chairman of the West Coast Regional Council in 2019, after six terms as a councillor, and reinstated an opening prayer at Council meetings. "New Zealand is a Christian country, and Christian standards are good ones," he claimed.

He was a member of the Te Tai o Poutini One Plan Committee, which is legally required to identify significant natural areas (SNAs) such as native forest or wetland remaining on private land. Ecologists Wildlands Consultants Ltd were hired to physically inspect features on private land that might qualify as a SNA, but Birchfield vowed to bar any ecologists from accessing his own land. "As far as I'm concerned, it's theft. If the government wants to save this stuff it should buy it." he said.

Birchfield was removed as chair by his fellow councillors on 28 March 2023. On 8 August, councillors voted to remove him from committees due to leaking confidential information to the media.

== Views and positions ==
=== Climate change denial ===
Birchfield denies the scientific consensus on climate change, specifically causation by humans and sea-level rise, calling it "a gigantic fraud" and "the biggest rort in the history of human civilisation". He refused to accept a report to the regional council about future hazards to the region from sea-level rise, calling it "bullshit". When Kiwibank announced it would no longer do business with the fossil fuel industry, he accused them of "trying to destroy the economy."

=== COVID-19 pandemic ===
Birchfield was rebuked by the New Zealand Race Relations Commissioner Meng Foon for referring to the COVID-19 as the "Chinese virus". He claimed "It's not racist at all, we all know where it started." Buller mayor Jamie Cleine and Greymouth mayor Tania Gibson distanced themselves from Birchfield's remarks.

=== Donald Trump ===
Birchfield is an admirer of former US President Donald Trump, wearing a MAGA cap in photographs and posing in front of a framed portrait of Trump.

=== Politics ===
He is a staunch National supporter, but in the 2011 general election ran as the ACT candidate for West Coast-Tasman, receiving 487 votes.
