= Simon O'Connor =

New Zealand politician (born 1976)

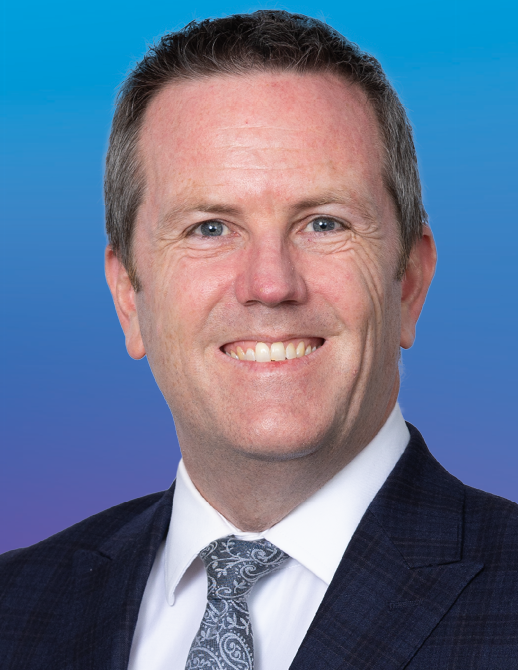
- O'Connor in 2023

Member of the New Zealand Parliament for Tāmaki
- In office 30 November 2011 – 14 October 2023
- Preceded by: Allan Peachey
- Succeeded by: Brooke Van Velden
- Majority: 15,402 (2020)

Personal details
- Born: 25 February 1976 (age 50)
- Party: National
- Spouse: Rachel Trimble (m. 2016)
- Relations: Simon Bridges (brother-in-law)
- Committees: Foreign Affairs, Defence, and Trade

Simon David O'Connor (born 25 February 1976) is a New Zealand former politician and a former member of the New Zealand House of Representatives for the National Party. He represented the Tāmaki electorate from 2011 to 2023.

== Early life ==
O'Connor was raised in Whangārei, the eldest of three children, where he attended St Mary's Primary School and Pompallier College. He was a keen fencer and was president of the Auckland University Fencing Club.

O'Connor completed training to be a Catholic priest, which involved working on the island of Taveuni in Fiji for two years at a vocational training centre, prison chaplaincy at Mount Eden Prison, military chaplaincy at Waiouru Army Base, and spending time with people in hospitals and hospices. He did not seek ordination, deciding instead to study and pursue a career in politics.

O'Connor graduated from the University of Auckland with a Bachelor of Arts in Geography and Political Studies (his Political Studies Honours dissertation looked at the works of René Girard), a Bachelor of Theology, and a Master of Arts with First Class Honours (Political Studies). He has also worked as a contracts manager for Southern Cross Insurance.

O'Connor was the chairperson of Monarchy New Zealand between 2010 and 2012 and remains a board member.

== Political career ==
New Zealand Parliament
Years	Term	Electorate	List	Party
2011–2014	50th	Tāmaki	62	National
2014–2017	51st	Tāmaki	43	National
2017–2020	52nd	Tāmaki	38	National
2020–2023	53rd	Tāmaki	35	National

O'Connor has been involved in the National Party since 2005. He was deputy chair of the party's Northern Region before seeking the National nomination for the Maungakiekie electorate in 2008. He lost the selection contest to Sam Lotu-Iiga, who went on to win the seat, but O'Connor was appointed as a list candidate for the 2008 general election, ranked 72nd.

He was selected as the party's candidate in the Tāmaki electorate following the withdrawal of sitting MP Allan Peachey shortly before the 2011 election and was elected to Parliament. In his first term, he was a member of the Education and Science committee and the Transport and Industrial Relations committee, and the deputy chair of the Finance and Expenditure committee. O'Connor held his electorate at the 2014 general election. In his second term, he chaired the Health committee. During his tenure as chair, the committee ran an inquiry into euthanasia which did not propose any changes to the law.

O'Connor was re-elected at both the 2017 general election and the 2020 general election. National was in opposition after these two elections. O'Connor held various National Party spokesperson roles during this period, including corrections (2017 to 2023), customs (2018 to 2023), arts, culture and heritage (2020 to 2023) and internal affairs (two separate periods in 2021 and 2023). He briefly resigned his portfolios in late 2021 when his brother-in-law, Simon Bridges, was demoted by National leader Judith Collins. He chaired the Foreign Affairs, Defence and Trade committee from 2017 to 2020 and was a member of the Justice committee from 2021 to 2023.

=== Defeat at the 2023 general election ===
On 30 September 2022, it was reported that three unknown people had launched campaigns to replace O'Connor as the National party's Tāmaki candidate at the 2023 New Zealand general election. On 21 October, O'Connor's challengers were identified as lawyer Andrew Grant and restaurant proprietor Sang Cho. Grant had publicly opposed "tough on crime" rhetoric. Ultimately, the challenge was unsuccessful and O'Connor was confirmed as the National Party candidate for Tāmaki at a party meeting in November 2022.

In late April 2023, ACT New Zealand confirmed that its deputy leader Brooke van Velden would be contesting O'Connor's Tāmaki electorate in a "two ticks" campaign during the 2023 general election. ACT leader David Seymour cited O'Connor's socially conservative views on abortion and euthanasia as factors in ACT's decision to seriously contest O'Connor's' seat. In August 2023, the National Party announced its party list for the election. O'Connor's position was 54th, down from 35th in 2020. An opinion poll released on 2 October showed van Velden tied with O'Connor. In the final result, van Velden was ahead by 4,158 votes. Due to O'Connor's low list ranking, he was not eligible to return to Parliament.

== Post-politics ==
=== Claims of PRC hacking ===
In April 2024, the New Zealand signals intelligence agency the Government Communications Security Bureau (GCSB) conceded that they had been aware that O'Connor had been targeted by China in an attempted computer hacking campaign – along with fellow former MP Loiusa Wall, and academic Professor Anne-Marie Brady – but had failed to brief any of the targets. O'Connor said he was disappointed that the GCSB had not told him and the other potential victims, as: "...I would have thought letting me know would have been a rather basic step in preventing any further incursions." O'Connor also expressed concern "...that much of this information eventually became public via the U.S. Department of Justice... yet New Zealand agencies still did not make contact with us [which] begs even further questions.”

The Minister Responsible for the GCSB, Hon Judith Collins KC, had earlier in March issued a statement attributing the compromise of Parliamentary Service and Parliamentary Counsel Office systems to the Chinese government-affiliated group APT40, describing the use of cyber espionage to "interfere with democratic and institutions..." as "unacceptable". Collins did not, however, name O'Connor, Wall, or Brady as intended targets at that time.

=== Conservative commentator and podcaster ===
In an interview on internet broadcaster Reality Check Radio with former MP and minister Rodney Hide, O'Connor announced that he was affiliating with the conservative Christian lobby group Family First. Family First released on 14 May 2024 news that O'Connor would host a weekly, live podcast across multiple streaming platforms, entitled Solid Ground. In a promotional trailer for the programme, O'Connor said it was to enable a discussion based on: "good values, good ethics, good principles."

The New Zealand Herald subsequently reported that O'Connor was scheduled to speak at the upcoming "UNSILENCED: Middle New Zealand on ideology" at Wellington's Tākina convention centre on 18 May alongside Family First Founder and National Director Bob McCoskrie and Destiny Church leader Brian Tamaki. The Convention Centre is owned and operated by Te Papa Museum and the Wellington City Council. Protest groups Queer Endurance In Defiance and the Pōneke Anti-Fascist Coalition denounced the conference for allegedly promoting transphobia and said it was contacting the Council in order to cancel the event on safety grounds. While Wellington City Council Māori Ward Councillor Nīkau Wi Neera called for the event's cancellation, Free Speech Union chief executive Jonathan Ayling defended the conference on free speech grounds.

Following a safety review, Te Papa allowed the event to proceed, but said it would monitor the situation and expressed support for the LGBT community. O'Connor spoke at the Unsilenced conference alongside Tamaki and British activist Kellie-Jay Keen-Minshull (who participated via video-link). 360 people attended the Unsilenced conference while a protest organised by Pōneke Anti-Fascist Coalition and Queer Endurance in Defiance attracted 500 people.

== Political positions ==
=== China ===
In 2020, O'Connor became a co-chair of the Inter-Parliamentary Alliance on China (IPAC), an international group of legislators working towards reform on how democratic countries approach China, and specifically, the Chinese Communist Party (CCP). In December 2020, he and fellow IPAC member Louisa Wall urged New Zealand to speak out against China's alleged "coercive diplomacy" and support Australia in the face of diplomatic and economic pressure from China. In August 2022, O'Connor, fellow IPAC member Labour MP Ingrid Leary, and other members from Australia, India and Japan launched a new local Indo-Pacific chapter to focus on increased Chinese militarisation in that region.

O’Connor, while Chair of New Zealand’s Foreign Affairs, Defence, and Trade Committee joined with his counterpart committee chair counterparts from the United Kingdom (Tom Tugendhat), Canada (Michael Levitt), and Australia (David Fawcett) in writing a joint letter to UN Secretary-General António Guterres asking that he appoint a special human rights envoy to monitor Hong Kong in light of the imposition of China’s new National Security Law.

During 2022, as IPAC co-chairs, O'Connor and Leary obtained information about the Solomon Islands-China Security Pact and raised concerns about Chinese military expansion in the Pacific.

In 2023, O’Connor asked Parliamentary Written Questions seeking information on the deployment of Chinese made cameras in New Zealand government offices. Subsequent reporting of the results indicated 120 cameras made by companies with links to the CCP, which had already been banned from British government buildings, were installed in New Zealand government premises – including in the home of an unnamed MP.

O’Connor wrote to representatives of Bytedance, owners of social media platform TikTok, asking about the privacy of New Zealanders' data. He subsequently welcomed the decision of the New Zealand Parliamentary Service to ban Tiktok on any devices connected to the parliamentary network over the risk of compromise the platform posed to sensitive data.

Media reported that O’Connor was involved with assisting a defector from the Chinese Consulate-General in Auckland, reportedly the first such defector to New Zealand since the end of the Cold War.

While co-chairing IPAC, O'Connor called for the government to rule out the extradition of New Zealand nationals to China; to set up a special visa scheme for Hong Kongers; and to initiate investigations into the treatment of Uyghurs in the Xinjiang province of China.

=== Taiwan ===
O’Connor has been a vocal supporter of Taiwan. In March 2023, he set up the first All Party Parliamentary Group on Taiwan within the New Zealand Parliament, being inaugural co-chair along with Labour's Ingrid Leary and involving around 15 other MPs. In November 2023, O'Connor was invited by the Taiwanese government to visit Taipei and meet with President Tsai Ing-wen, Foreign Minister Joseph Wu, and other senior political representatives as part of the Indo-Pacific Formosa Club initiative.

=== International human rights ===
O’Connor repeatedly called for New Zealand to introduce a Magnitsky-style sanctions regime in New Zealand. He worked closely with Bill Browder – Head of the Global Magnitsky Justice campaign – and was acknowledged for his efforts by Browder in his book Freezing Order.

O’Connor also joined with Labour MP Louisa Wall in calling for New Zealand to introduce modern slavery legislation. During the 53rd Parliament O'Connor tabled, as a member bill, his Modern Slavery Reporting Bill. This measure was not drawn from the ballot.

In 2022, O'Connor joined other elected representatives from around the world in Washington DC as part of the Interparliamentary Task Force to Combat Online Antisemitism. At hearings, he and other representatives questioned Meta, Twitter, YouTube and TikTok about removing antisemitic content from their digital platforms.

In June 2023, O’Connor welcomed the Tibetan Sikyong (democratically elected leader-in-exile), Penpa Tsering, to the New Zealand Parliament and hosted a lunch for him with several other Members of Parliament. Tsering expressed disappointment that Foreign Minister Nanaia Mahuta had refused to meet him.

Later in 2023, O’Connor challenged the Iranian Ambassador to New Zealand Reza Nazarahari over the violent repression of protests when the Ambassador attended a select committee hearing at Parliament. O'Connor criticised Iran's detention of two New Zealanders, Topher Richwhite and Bridget Thackwray, who were held for nearly four months without charge before being released. O'Connor also joined several protests against the regime's brutal crackdowns organised by Iranians in New Zealand.

=== Conscience votes ===
O'Connor voted conservatively on most conscience issues, although he opposed raising the drinking age back to 20 in 2012 and he supported the introduction of Easter Sunday trading.

His votes on significant conscience matters were:

- against raising the drinking age from 18 in 2012;
- against the Marriage (Definition of Marriage) Amendment Bill in 2013, a bill allowing same-sex couples to marry in New Zealand;
- against changing the flag of New Zealand during the 2015–2016 New Zealand flag referendums;
- in support of a bill to allow Easter Sunday trading in 2016;
- against the End of Life Choice Bill in 2017 and 2019;
- against the Abortion Legislation Bill in 2019 and 2020; and
- against the Conversion Practices Prohibition Legislation Bill in 2022.

On 10 September 2017, two weeks before the general election and on World Suicide Prevention Day, O'Connor criticised then-Labour leader Jacinda Ardern for being "concerned about youth suicide" but being "happy to encourage the suicide of the elderly, disabled, and sick" by way of her support of the End of Life Choice Bill.

In March 2020, he attracted attention for a statement he made as part of his speech in opposition to the third reading of the Abortion Legislation Bill, where he repeated a quotation from the Bible in Latin: "Mihi vindicta: ego retribuam, dicit Dominus," which is translated as "Vengeance is mine; I will repay, saith the Lord.”

In late June 2022, O'Connor published a Facebook post welcoming the United States Supreme Court's overturning of Roe v. Wade. He subsequently removed the post after National Party leader Christopher Luxon stated that the post was "causing distress" and did not represent the party's position on abortion. In response to the controversy around O'Connor's post, several Tāmaki residents called for O'Connor to resign as their Member of Parliament. By contrast, former National MP Alfred Ngaro defended O'Connor's freedom of expression and accused Luxon of silencing National MPs. On 28 June, O'Connor apologised to his National Party colleagues for the hurt and distress that his Facebook post had caused. He denied that he had been "gagged" by Luxon and explained that he had offered to taken down the post because it had attracted " toxic and unhealthy" comments.

== Personal life ==
On 10 December 2016, O'Connor married Rachel Trimble, the sister of fellow National MP Simon Bridges, and has five stepchildren.

New Zealand Parliament
Preceded by Allan Peachey	Member of Parliament for Tāmaki; 2011–2023	Succeeded by Brooke van Velden
