= Sea Rotmann =

New Zealand marine biologist

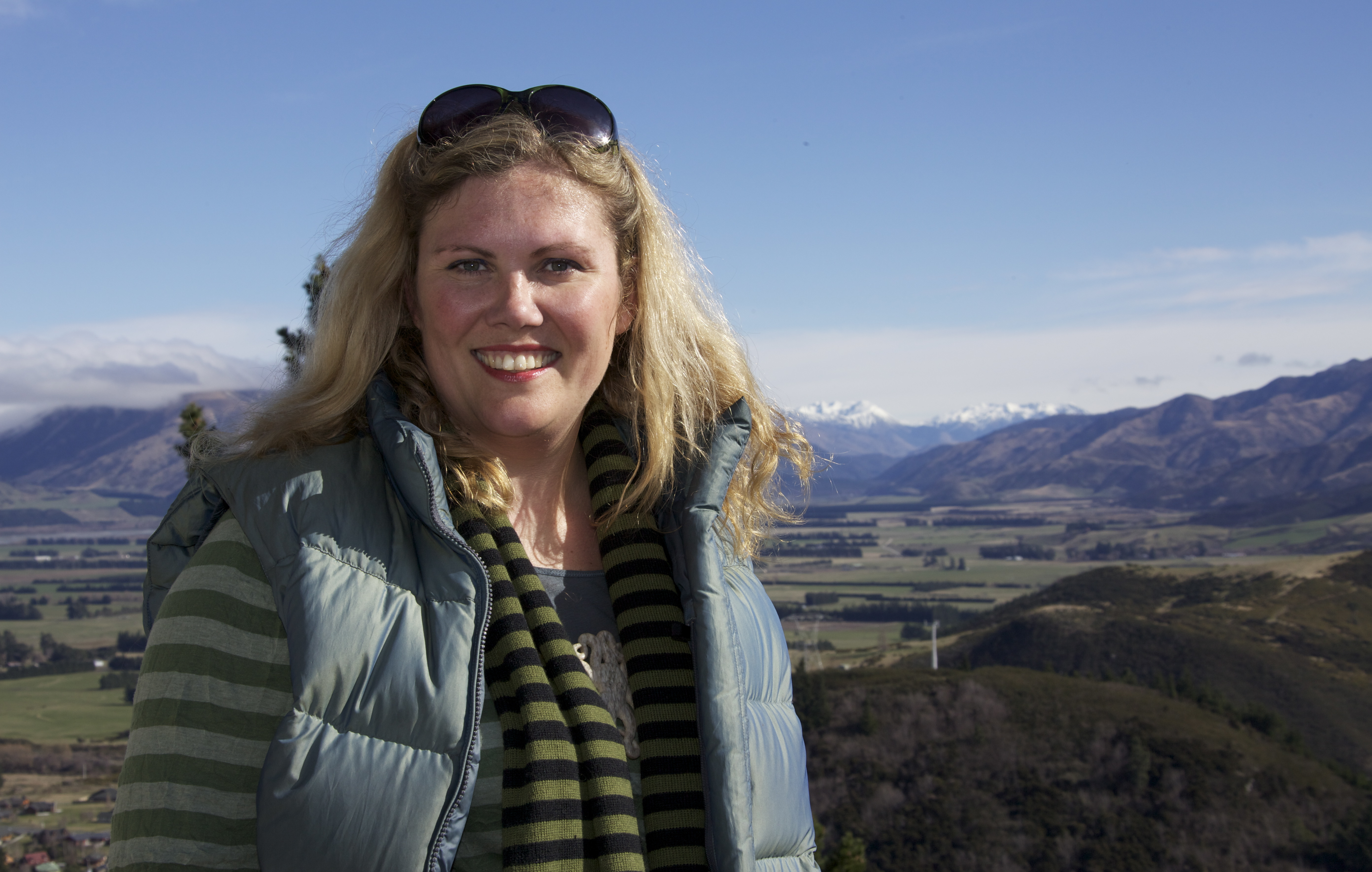
- Rotmann in Hanmer Springs, Winter 2010
- Born: Sandra Rotmann
- Education: James Cook University
- Known for: Environmental advocacy
- Scientific career
- Fields: Marine biology
- Thesis: Tissue thickness as a tool to monitor the stress response of massive porites corals to turbidity impact on Lihir Island, Papua New Guinea (2004)

Sea Rotmann is a New Zealand-based marine biologist. She was a spokesperson and organiser for the Wellington chapter of environmental advocacy group Extinction Rebellion Aotearoa New Zealand.

== Biography ==
Rotmann was born and raised in Austria. When she was 20, she moved to Australia and studied marine biology at James Cook University, Queensland. Her PhD thesis was in marine ecology and environmental studies, and focused on human-induced environmental impacts on coral reefs, including field research in Papua New Guinea.

Since 2005, Rotmann has focused on sustainability implementation in policy, practice, and research. In 2011 she started her own consultancy called SEA – Sustainable Energy Advice Ltd, focusing on turning behaviour change theory into best practice. From 2012 to 2018, she ran the first global research collaboration on behaviour change in demand-side management (DSM) for the International Energy Agency's Demand-Side Management Programme (now Users TCP). Her current Users TCP by IEA research project is on hard-to-reach energy users in the residential and commercial sectors.

Rotmann is active in environmental advocacy. She co-chairs a group of Wellington residents opposed to the extension of Wellington International Airport's runway, and was involved with the local chapter of the Aotearoa New Zealand Extinction Rebellion group. In 2011 she stood for election as the Green Party of Aotearoa New Zealand candidate for the Wairarapa electorate. In 2014 she stood for Parliament again, also for the Green Party.
