= Allan Peachey =

New Zealand politician

Member of the New Zealand Parliament for Tamaki
- In office 17 September 2005 – 6 November 2011
- Preceded by: Clem Simich
- Succeeded by: Simon O'Connor (vacant until election)
- Majority: 17,020 (45.00%)

Personal details
- Born: 18 October 1949
- Died: 6 November 2011 (aged 62)
- Party: National Party (1990 – 2011)

Allan Frederick Peachey (18 October 1949 – 6 November 2011) was a New Zealand politician and Member of Parliament for Tamaki.

== School principal ==
Peachey completed a Master's degree in history at the University of Canterbury in 1972, supervised by W. David McIntyre. Before his election to Parliament, Peachey was employed as the principal of Rangitoto College, the largest secondary school in New Zealand. He had previously been the president of the Secondary Principals Association of New Zealand, and was an outspoken commentator on educational issues. An example of such commentary is his book What's Up with Our Schools?, which was released in 2005.

== Member of Parliament ==
New Zealand Parliament
Years	Term	Electorate	List	Party
2005–2008	48th	Tāmaki	30	National
2008–2011	49th	Tāmaki	34	National

Peachey was selected as a list candidate for the National Party in the 2002 elections, and was viewed by many as one of the party's brighter prospects. His ranking on the party's list (eighteenth, above several sitting MPs) was thought sufficient to guarantee him entry to Parliament, but the National Party's overall performance was poor enough that he narrowly missed out.

Peachey stood for election again in the 2005 elections. He was ranked at thirty on National's party list, but was also selected as the National candidate for Tamaki, traditionally regarded as a safe National seat. This selection caused a certain amount of controversy, as the seat already had a sitting National MP. That MP, Clem Simich, was persuaded to withdraw, and was rewarded with a high list placing and the National Party candidacy in the electorate of Mangere. Peachey won the Tamaki electorate seat, receiving 20,956 votes of a total 36,946. The immediate runner-up in his electorate was Leila Boyle, a Labour Party candidate who received 11,446 votes.

== "Knife in Your Back" controversy ==
Controversy arose when Peachey e-mailed Selwyn College co-principal Carol White declining an invitation to the school's prizegiving stating at the bottom: "Yes, I do have a knife in your back, so be careful." Peachey quickly issued an apology.

== Retirement and death ==
Although Peachey initially planned to seek re-election in the 2011 election, having been renominated for Tāmaki electorate and been ranked 48th on the party list, he subsequently announced his withdrawal "to focus on his treatment and recovery from his recent ill health". He had not previously disclosed the nature or extent of his ill health. His sudden withdrawal shortly before the elections forced the National Party to arrange a new candidate selection process.

Allan Peachey died on 6 November 2011, 20 days before the 2011 election and what would have been the end of his parliamentary term, after a battle with cancer.

New Zealand Parliament
Preceded by Clem Simich	Member of Parliament for Tāmaki; 2005–2011	Succeeded by Simon O'Connor
