= New Zealand Youth Parliament =

Triennial political event in New Zealand

The New Zealand Youth Parliament, held once in each term of parliament (usually every three or four years), is an event used to promote the civic and community engagement of New Zealand youth. The event has been held since 1994, and takes place at the New Zealand Parliament Buildings. The latest Youth Parliament, the 11th Youth Parliament, took place on 1 and 2 July 2025.

== Role and functions ==
Youth Parliament is an initiative led by the Minister for Youth, currently James Meager. The Minister works with a committee of their Parliamentary colleagues (representing every party in Parliament) to administer Youth Parliament.

The Minister receives support from the Ministry of Youth Development, who work closely with other agencies within the parliamentary complex including The Office of the Speaker, Parliamentary Services and the Office of the Clerk of the New Zealand House of Representatives.

== History ==
The New Zealand Youth Parliament was first held in 1994, being held to mark the 20th anniversary of the voting age being lowered to 18. The event was shorter than it is now, with young people coming to Parliament for an educational day. Due to the success of the event, Cabinet invited the Minister of Youth Affairs to continue holding the event every three or four years. Since then, the event has been held in 1997, 2000, 2004, 2007, 2010, 2013, 2016, 2019, 2022, and 2025.

Former Labour MP Darren Hughes, who once held the Statistics portfolio and was the associate minister for Social Development and Employment, was a Youth MP at the first Youth Parliament in 1994. Hughes said in his maiden speech as MP that he was proud to be the first Youth MP to become the "real thing".

== Event ==
The Youth Parliament takes place over two days, and is designed to be as similar to the actual running of Parliament as possible. The event is typically opened by the governor-general. The website of the Ministry of Youth Development says that Youth Parliament "is an opportunity for young New Zealanders to influence government decision-making as active citizens and have their views heard by key decision-makers and the public."

Throughout the event Youth MPs take part in a variety of parliamentary activities. A mock bill is established and focused on, usually targeting an issue relating to youth or that youth can be involved in. Youth MPs work on various select committees and consider submissions, ask questions of Cabinet Ministers, participate in debates, come together in caucus sessions and experience various other aspects of parliament. Youth MPs have an opportunity to meet actual members of parliament. Members of the public can also watch mock debates in the debating chamber, as they would with a normal parliamentary debate.

As well as the Youth MPs, 20 youth press gallery members are chosen by the Parliamentary Press Gallery, and report on the event and running of parliament, similar to the actual press gallery.

The New Zealand Business and Parliament Trust runs a competition open to all Youth MPs and Youth Press Gallery members, which asks entrants to discuss the experience and what they have learned and taken back to their community. In 2007 this was an essay, and in 2010 entrants created a video. Prizes totaling several thousands of dollars are available to the winners.

=== Select committees ===
During the event Youth MPs work on parliamentary select committees. Each committee views and discusses submissions, and reviews related legislation. Each committee relates to a different subject. As of 2013, there were ten Youth Parliament select committees. These are:

- Social Services
- Health
- Transport and Industrial Relations
- Local Government and Environment
- Education and Science
- Commerce
- Foreign Affairs, Defence and Trade
- Justice
- Maori Affairs
- Primary Production

== Selection and role ==
Young people, aged 16 to 18 years, from around New Zealand are chosen by their local (electorate or list) Member of Parliament (MP) to be a Youth Member of Parliament (Youth MP). There is no set process for an MP to select their Youth MP. During Youth Parliament, Youth MPs have the opportunity to debate legislation, sit on select committees and ask parliamentary questions of Cabinet Ministers. Youth MPs are independent, as opposed to belonging to a parliamentary party.

Around the Youth Parliament event, Youth MPs remain in the role for a period of time, and are expected to gain an understanding of the ideas and concerns of youth in the area. In 2013 this was from 1 May to 1 December, with the event being held in July, and during this time period the Youth MPs had the opportunity to work with their local communities and local MP.

== Organisation ==
The organisation of Youth Parliament is overseen by the Multi-Party Parliamentary Steering Committee. A representative from each party represented in Parliament is invited to join the committee. The aim is to ensure non-partisan organisation of Youth Parliament as well as active participation by all parties, to ensure that the event is successful. The Ministry of Youth Development also works on organising and promoting the event, with the Minister of Youth Development being responsible for the event overall.

== 1st Youth Parliament (1994) ==
=== Youth MPs 1994 ===
Youth MP	Electorate	Representing
Richard Adams	Eastern Hutt	Paul Swain
Tane Aikman	Eastern Bay of Plenty	Tony Ryall
Tina Alexander	Napier	Geoff Braybrooke
Carly Allbon	Remuera	Doug Graham
Susan Amaru	Māngere	David Lange
Shannon Austin	New Plymouth	Harry Duynhoven
Mark Barnard	Birkenhead	Ian Revell
Melinka Berridge	Tauranga	Winston Peters
Michelle Brewer	Matamata	John Luxton
Rachel Brighouse	Franklin	Bill Birch
Margaret Browne	Albany	Don McKinnon
Nicholette Buddle	Eden	Christine Fletcher
Sharon Campbell	St Albans	David Caygill
Angela Cassidy-Ellice	Northern Maori	Tau Henare
Delia Cassie	Waitaki	Alec Neill
Estelle Clifford	Kapiti	Roger Sowry
Nicola Creamer	Waitakere	Brian Neeson
Timothy Dick	Wairarapa	Wyatt Creech
Paula Dixon	Manawatu	Jill White
Riki Dodunski	Western Maori	Koro Wētere
James Doolan	Tāmaki	Clem Simich
Emma Dowdle	Kaimai	Robert Anderson
Angela Edgar	Wellington-Karori	Pauline Gardiner
Helen England	Roskill	Phil Goff
Aroha Eynon	Christchurch Central	Lianne Dalziel
Kris Faafoi	Sydenham	Jim Anderton
Laura Feasey	Tasman	Nick Smith
Judith Fussell	Miramar	Annette King
Andre George	Rangitikei	Denis Marshall
David Gold	Waikaremoana	Roger McClay
Ana Gray	Southern Maori	Whetu Tirikatene-Sullivan
Anne Hale	Hauraki	Warren Kyd
Michelle Heath	Timaru	Jim Sutton
Paula Hellyer	Otago	Warren Cooper
Alison Helm	Dunedin West	Clive Matthewson
Dylan Hohepa	Far North	John Carter
Michael Hope	Marlborough	Doug Kidd
Darren Hughes	Horowhenua	Judy Keall
Amanda Hunt	Wanganui	Jill Pettis
Juliana Hutley	Heretaunga	Peter McCardle
Craig Ireson	Tarawera	Max Bradford
Dorothy Isaia	Otara	Taito Phillip Field
Lucas Jacob	Matakana	Graeme Lee
Anita Jardor	Papakura	John Robertson
Sara Johnson	Onslow	Peter Dunne
Sacha Judd	North Shore	Bruce Cliffe
Kato'one Kaho	Onehunga	Richard Northey
William Kaipo	Hobson	Ross Meurant
Julie Keenan	Palmerston North	Steve Maharey
Sonia Kennedy	Glenfield	Peter Hilt
Daniel Kerr	Hawkes Bay	Michael Laws
Julie Kerr	Rangiora	Jim Gerard
Kirsten King	Clutha	Robin Gray
Anna Kirk	Waikato	Rob Storey
Jessica Kohe	Porirua	Graham Kelly
Cristen Lind	St Kilda	Michael Cullen
Celia MacKinnon	Nelson	John Blincoe
Wiki Malton	Hastings	Rick Barker
Sam Manu	Pencarrow	Trevor Mallard
Clare Marflitt	Papatoetoe	Ross Robertson
Jessica Martens	Lyttelton	Ruth Dyson
Gay Matthews	Whangarei	John Banks
Kara McDougall	Auckland Central	Sandra Lee-Vercoe
Miles McGill	Waipa	Katherine O'Regan
Joseph McLean	Raglan	Simon Upton
Kate McMillan	West Coast	Damian O'Connor
Kerry Milestone	Western Hutt	Joy Quigley
Anthony Mills	Manurewa	George Hawkins
Gaynor Morgan	Hamilton West	Martin Gallagher
Patricia Muir	Wallace	Bill English
Miranda Northey	Mount Albert	Helen Clark
Cushla O'Neill	Invercargill	Mark Peck
Deborah Pollard	Te Atatu	Chris Carter
Nicky Proctor	Waitotara	Peter Gresham
Anne Ross	Eastern Maori	Peter Tapsell
Sally Routledge	Christchurch North	Mike Moore
Lucy Scandrett	Fendalton	Philip Burdon
Phillip Schone	Island Bay	Elizabeth Tennet
Rebecca Selby	Hamilton East	Dianne Yates
Katherine Short	New Lynn	Jonathan Hunt
Cathryn Simpson	Avon	Larry Sutherland
Bronwyn Sing	Dunedin North	Pete Hodgson
Melanie Speer	Pakuranga	Maurice Williamson
Bradley Stone	Selwyn	David Carter
Maria Syme	Tongariro	Mark Burton
Regan Thomson	East Coast Bays	Murray McCully
Lynne Tizzard	Panmure	Judith Tizard
Mani Toailoa	Henderson	Jack Elder
Karl von Randow	Titirangi	Suzanne Sinclair
Gillian Waite	Pahiatua	John Falloon
Anna Walkington	Yaldhurst	Margaret Austin
Joanne Watkinson	Howick	Trevor Rogers
Alison Weston	King Country	Jim Bolger
Adelle Wintle	Kaipara	Lockwood Smith
Craig Wisnewski	Taranaki	Roger Maxwell
Harvey Wood	Rakaia	Jenny Shipley
Desiree Wright	Awarua	Eric Roy
Maria Wynard	Gisborne	Janet Mackey
Philippa Yardley	Rotorua	Paul East

== 2nd Youth Parliament (1997) ==
=== Youth MPs 1997 ===
List means the individual is representing a List MP, while Electorate indicates they are representing an Electorate MP.

Youth MP	List/Electorate	Representing
Melissa Adams	List	Sandra Lee-Vercoe
Jonelle Amalfitano	List	Jenny Bloxham
Helen Apthorp	List	Ann Batten
David Arnold	Rangitikei	Denis Marshall
Hoani Ashby	Te Tai Tokerau	Tau Henare
Kavitha Babu	Port Waikato	Bill Birch
Joan Benge	List	Annabel Young
Nicola Binica	List	Alamein Kopu
Helen Louise Blazey	Banks Peninsula	David Carter
Maria Brighouse	Taupo	Mark Burton
Gareth Brown	Wairarapa	Wyatt Creech
Candice Brown	New Lynn	Phil Goff
Connie Buchanan	List	Doug Woolerton
Emma Buchanan	List	Robyn McDonald
Ruth Burdekin	List	Ron Mark
Jaime Burte	List	Jack Elder
Amanda Carmichael	Wigram	Jim Anderton
David Carter	Mana	Graham Kelly
Natasha Collvile	List	Liz Gordon
Michelle Conning	Waitakere	Marie Hasler
Fionna Cumming	Rimutaka	Paul Swain
Anna Davidson	Wellington Central	Richard Prebble
Claire Davison	List	Frank Grover
Marieke Degeest	Dunedin North	Pete Hodgson
Andrew Dew	List	Peter Brown
Tui Dewes	List	Peter McCardle
Troy Edhouse	Rotorua	Max Bradford
William Flockton	List	Eric Roy
Hamish Forsyth	Nelson	Nick Smith
Timothy Touhuni Funaki	List	Mark Gosche
Amelia Gaffy	List	Pam Corkery
Jonathan Good	Owairaka	Helen Clark
Jody Frances Grinter	List	Paul East
Richard Grubb	Aoraki	Jim Sutton
Ngahuia Hawke	List	Joe Hawke
Anita Hayward	List	John Wright
Michelle Hede	Manukau East	Ross Robertson
Tania Herbert	List	Dover Samuels
Te Aruhe Heretaunga	List	Dianne Yates
Lindsey Hiebendaal	List	Laila Harré
Deborah Hollander	Palmerston North	Steve Maharey
Lauren Houpapa	Maungakiekie	Belinda Vernon
Mariana Huka	List	Georgina te Heuheu
Teneka Hyndman	Māngere	Taito Phillip Field
Suzannah Jessep	List	Rod Donald
Zannah Johnston	Rakaia	Jenny Shipley
Matthew Kemp	List	Don McKinnon
Katrina Kirikino	Mahia	Janet Mackey
Robert Korako	Waimakariri	Mike Moore
Brad Kose	List	Arthur Anae
Richard Laird	List	Peter Gresham
Yunn Lee	List	Pansy Wong
Kathryn Lindsay	Whangarei	John Banks
Catherine Loft	List	Patricia Schnauer
Fred Luatua	Tāmaki	Clem Simich
Kevin Luong	Waipareira	Brian Neeson
Kris McDonald	List	Ruth Dyson
Samual McLeod	Tukituki	Rick Barker
James McMillan	North Shore	Wayne Mapp
Leonie Mikosch	Bay of Plenty	Tony Ryall
Christene Mills	List	Grant Gillon
Lisa Minchin	List	Muriel Newman
Kevin Moar	List	Phillida Bunkle
Aria Mullins	List	Donna Awatere Huata
Rajesh Nahna	Taranaki-King Country	Jim Bolger
Matthew Nippert	List	Deborah Morris
Kim O'Leary	Otaki	Judy Keall
Sarah O'Neill	Invercargill	Mark Peck
Jennie Parker	List	Roger Sowry
Catherine Parker	Hamilton East	Tony Steel
Ben Parton	Hutt South	Trevor Mallard
Alexandra Pasley	Otago	Gavan Herlihy
Helen Patterson	List	Neil Kirton
Bevan Peachey	Albany	Murray McCully
Carissa Perano	Christchurch East	Larry Sutherland
Jolene Phillips	Kaikoura	Doug Kidd
Anna Pilbrow	Ilam	Gerry Brownlee
Inresa Seafa Pillua	List	Derek Quigley
Daniel Price	Whanganui	Jill Pettis
Gina Price	List	Brian Donnelly
Matthew Purvis	List	Jeanette Fitzsimons
Bhavesh Ranchhod	Coromandel	Murray McLean
Donald Riden	List	Rodney Hide
Lena Ripley	Napier	Geoff Braybrooke
Matehaere Rotana	Te Tai Hauāuru	Tuku Morgan
Jenny Ryan	Ohariu-Belmont	Peter Dunne
Kamahl Santamaria	Pakuranga	Maurice Williamson
Jonathan Scragg	List	Owen Jennings
Bryony Shackell	Dunedin South	Michael Cullen
Patti Shih (Stone)	Hamilton West	Bob Simcock
Melissa Short	List	Doug Graham
Luc Shorter	Te Puku O Te Whenua	Rana Waitai
Aiden Silbery-Shoji	List	Joy McLauchlan
Anna Sjardin	List	Katherine O'Regan
Nicola Slade	Hunua	Warren Kyd
Sriwhana Spong	Epsom	Christine Fletcher
Kathryn Stewart	Rongotai	Annette King
Manui Christina Stewart	Christchurch Central	Tim Barnett
Ana Su'a Hawkins	List	Lianne Dalziel
Crystal Tawhiao	List	Nanaia Mahuta
Le Roy James Taylor	Tauranga	Winston Peters
Rawinia Te Hau Atawhai	Te Tai Tonga	Tu Wyllie
Sean Teddy	Karapiro	John Luxton
Juanita Teepa	Te Tai Rawhiti	Tuariki Delamere
Jarrad Tilyard	List	Roger Maxwell
Lizzie Towl	List	Marian Hobbs
Imee Tribo	Manurewa	George Hawkins
Rebecca Turner	Northland	John Carter
Tangi Utikere	List	Jill White
Ayesha Verrall	Clutha-Southland	Bill English
Hayden Vink	List	Ken Shirley
Simon Walker	Auckland Central	Judith Tizard
Vikki Weake	List	Simon Upton
Hollie Weir	New Plymouth	Harry Duynhoven
Yannina Whiteley	West Coast-Tasman	Damian O'Connor
Nicola Whyte	List	Jonathan Hunt
Chelsea Wintle	Rodney	Lockwood Smith
Andrea Wolmuther	Northcote	Ian Revell
Haylyn Wong	List	Matt Robson
Marcia Wood	List	Tariana Turia

== 3rd Youth Parliament (2000) ==
=== Youth MPs 2000 ===
List means the individual is representing a List MP, while Electorate indicates they are representing an Electorate MP.

Youth MP	List/Electorate	Representing
Melissa Aubroeck	Pakuranga	Maurice Williamson
Carl Bates	List	Annabel Young
Camilla Belich	Rongotai	Annette King
Jason Belworthy	List	Max Bradford
Leif Bergman	West Coast-Tasman	Damien O'Connor
Finlay Bird	Wairarapa	Georgina Beyer
Chris Bishop	List	Muriel Newman
Emily Brown	Albany	Murray McCully
David Buckingham	List	Penny Webster
Stephanie Campbell	List	Margaret Wilson
Benet Carroll	New Plymouth	Harry Duynhoven
Emma Cooney	List	Doug Woolerton
Laura Crone	Manukau East	Ross Robertson
Brian Davy	List	Grant Gillon
Jessica Deane	Karapiro	Lindsay Tisch
Francesca Deery	Port Waikato	Paul Hutchison
Anna Doogan	Bay of Plenty	Tony Ryall
Fraser Dron	List	Owen Jennings
Mark Edwards	Wigram	Jim Anderton
Dustene Felise	Mana	Graham Kelly
Anita Ferguson	List	Doug Kidd
Oliver Ferris	Waimakariri	Clayton Cosgrove
Colin Fife	List	Michael Cullen
Anna Furness	Epsom	Richard Worth
Bridget Gabites	Aoraki	Jim Sutton
Richard George	List	Gerry Eckhoff
Daniel Gillott	List	Ken Shirley
Simon Gilmore	Dunedin North	Pete Hodgson
Gilbert Goldie-Anderson	North Shore	Wayne Mapp
Kimberly Good	Mount Albert	Helen Clark
Matthew Green	Hamilton East	Tony Steel
Deidra Hanley	Maungakiekie	Mark Gosche
Jessie-Anne Hardcastle	List	Keith Locke
Katherine Harland	List	Katherine Rich
Marama Harris	Waiariki	Mita Ririnui
Anna Harris	Kaikoura	Lynda Scott
Shannon Hati	List	Bob Simcock
Julia Haydon	Tukituki	Rick Barker
Mark Heine	List	Stephen Franks
Megan Henderson	Northland	John Carter
Stuart Hislop	Rodney	Lockwood Smith
Huia Huata	List	Donna Awatere Huata
Tara Jeffrey	Whanganui	Jill Pettis
Hailee Kareko	Te Tai Tokerau	Dover Samuels
Marama Karetai	List	Sandra Lee-Vercoe
Nick Kelly	Rimutaka	Paul Swain
Rachel Kerr	List	Ian Ewen-Street
Sarah Kyung Il Kim	List	Pansy Wong
Stacey Kokaua	Dunedin South	David Benson-Pope
Tamsyn Kuklinski	Taranaki-King Country	Shane Ardern
Anita Lala	List	John Luxton
Joseph Lane	Northcote	Ann Hartley
Rimoni Leota	Hunua	Warren Kyd
Kiersten Leslie	List	Dianne Yates
Michael Lovelock	Rangitikei	Simon Power
Michael Mabbett	List	Simon Upton
Steven Macaulay	List	John Wright
Courtenay Mackie	List	Rod Donald
Jerome Mahutoto	Māngere	Taito Phillip Field
Anita Manuel	East Coast	Janet Mackey
Crystal Marks	Ohariu-Belmont	Peter Dunne
Bevan Marten	Wellington Central	Marian Hobbs
Caitlin Mary McGee	Auckland Central	Judith Tizard
Sam McGoldwick	Ilam	Gerry Brownlee
Kasey McPherson	Taupo	Mark Burton
Hannah Melvin	List	Eric Roy
Sharina Member	List	Marie Hasler
Areti Metua-Mate	List	Sue Kedgley
Alex Milne	List	Roger Sowry
Adam Moffat	Clutha-Southland	Bill English
Tim Moore	Christchurch Central	Tim Barnett
Julia Moore	Tauranga	Winston Peters
Jade Moses	List	Willie Jackson
Serena Mosley	Whangarei	Phil Heatley
Vanessa Mulu	Te Atatu	Chris Carter
Campbell Myers	List	Belinda Vernon
Benjamin Naylor	Otago	Gavan Herlihy
Barbara Ngawati	Manurewa	George Hawkins
Alexander O'Brien	List	Ron Mark
Kimberley O'Connell	Christchurch East	Lianne Dalziel
Cathryn O'Sullivan	List	Helen Duncan
Sarah Officer	Invercargill	Mark Peck
Wiremu Paikea	List	Sue Bradford
Tabitha Laura Pasco	List	Matt Robson
Holly Payne	Hutt South	Trevor Mallard
Tama Pokai	Te Tai Tonga	Mahara Okeroa
Simon Randall	Mount Roskill	Phil Goff
Matthew Alexander Rea	List	Rodney Hide
Nicky Reid	Te Tai Hauāuru	Nanaia Mahuta
Shaun Mariri Rerekura	List	Tariana Turia
Gareth Richards	Palmerston North	Steve Maharey
Daniel Rimmer	Hamilton West	Martin Gallagher
Bronwyn Rolls	List	Anne Tolley
Caleb Rosamond	Waitakere	Brian Neeson
Shaini Russell	List	Liz Gordon
Kate Selby Smith	Coromandel	Jeanette Fitzsimons
Kate Shuttleworth	List	Nandor Tanczos
Erin Simmons	List	Kevin Campbell
Christopher Sinclair	Banks Peninsula	Ruth Dyson
Rosemary Skudder	List	Richard Prebble
Poni Smith	List	Winnie Laban
Kate Southward	Napier	Geoff Braybrooke
Gemma Stewart	List	Laila Harré
Charlotte Stone	Tāmaki	Clem Simich
James Takane	Hauraki	John Tamihere
Stephanie Takarangi	List	Georgina te Heuheu
Pelema Edward Taulapapa	Titirangi	David Cunliffe
Charles Thomas	List	Arthur Anae
Simon Thurston	Rotorua	Steve Chadwick
Robbie Tier	List	Jonathan Hunt
Raymond Tull	List	Peter Brown
Jacqui Wadham	List	Wyatt Creech
Heath Walters	Rakaia	Jenny Shipley
Tim Wastney	Nelson	Nick Smith
Anna Webb	List	Brian Donnelly
Crystal Whitmore	List	David Carter
Natalie Williams	List	Phillida Bunkle

== 4th Youth Parliament (2004) ==
The 4th Youth Parliament took place on 16 and 17 August 2004.

=== Youth MPs 2004 ===
List means the individual is representing a List MP, while Electorate indicates they are representing an Electorate MP.

Youth MP	List/Electorate	Representing
Bekki Abernethy	List	
Shahlaa Al-Tiay	List	Pita Paraone
David Beath	Northland	John Carter
Sarah Berry	List	
Johan Ben Te Rawhitiroa Bosch	List	
Ryan Bridge	Otaki	Darren Hughes
Lucy Brown	Kaikoura	Lynda Scott
Kathryn Bulk	Dunedin South	David Benson-Pope
Judeena Carpenter	Auckland Central	Judith Tizard
Wilson Chau	Mount Albert	Helen Clark
Luke Claasen	Ikaroa-Rāwhiti	Parekura Horomia
Emma Collins	List	
Michael Cope	List	
James Cooper	List	
Stephanie Crutcher	Whangarei	Phil Heatley
John Darroch	List	
Josh Dennis	List	
Jacob Dodunski	List	
Gerard Edwards	Te Atatu	Chris Carter
Andy Feau	Māngere	Taito Phillip Field
Lucy Forgie	Palmerston North	Steve Maharey
Johanna Forrest	Wairarapa	Georgina Beyer
Nirupa George	List	
Seth Gorrie	Christchurch East	Lianne Dalziel
Kathryn Grant	List	
Melaina Grindley	List	
Jenna Hansen	List	
Katherine Harrison	Taupo	Mark Burton
Dannielle Hay	List	
Kyle Henderson	List	
Polly Higbee	List	
Ebony Hinds	Dunedin North	Pete Hodgson
Sarah Homan	List	
Tipene Horopapera	List	
Ryan Hunt	Bay of Plenty	Tony Ryall
Jordan James	Manurewa	George Hawkins
Radhika Joseph	Clevedon	Judith Collins
Helen Keeling	List	
Ahmad Khawaja	List	
Sam Kidd	Tauranga	Winston Peters
Jordan King	List	
Tuku Kururangi	Tukituki	Rick Barker
Emma Kuperus	List	
Tania Langlands	Taranaki-King Country	Shane Ardern
Georgia Lawrence	List	
Isabel Lee	Manukau East	Ross Robertson
Judy Lee	List	
Elizabeth Lewer	List	
Steph Lewis	Whanganui	Jill Pettis
Joseph Lill	Otago	David Parker
Emma Lilley	East Coast	Janet Mackey
Diana Loughnan	Christchurch Central	Tim Barnett
Tom McCarthy	Wellington Central	Marian Hobbs
Jade McCormick	Mana	Winnie Laban
Megan McCrea	List	
Isla McKechnie	East Coast Bays	Murray McCully
Catherine Mackmurdie	List	Mike Ward
Bonnie Mager	Invercargill	Mark Peck
Rowan Manhire-Heath	Napier	Russell Fairbrother
Renee Mason	Helensville	John Key
Nicole Mathewson	West Coast-Tasman	Damien O'Connor
Amy Max	Nelson	Nick Smith
Rachel Meadowcroft	List	Rod Donald
Desiree Middleton	Coromandel	Sandra Goudie
Pamela Mills	Mount Roskill	Phil Goff
Rebekah Modlik	Rimutaka	Paul Swain
Jeremy Moller	Hutt South	Trevor Mallard
Amy Morton	New Plymouth	Harry Duynhoven
Kate Muirhead	List	
Ayla Nathan	Te Tai Tokerau	Dover Samuels
Chris Neels	Pakuranga	Maurice Williamson
Michelle Nicol	List	
Annie Nikolao	Maungakiekie	Mark Gosche
Ramon Olsen	List	
Alexander Osborn	Tāmaki	Clem Simich
James Owen	Ohariu-Belmont	Peter Dunne
Renee Parkinson	List	
Hemi Paurini	Te Tai Hauāuru	Tariana Turia
Hinewai Pomare	Tāmaki Makaurau	John Tamihere
Elizabeth Pou	List	
Clare Poulter	Aoraki	Jim Sutton
Kim Pronk	List	
Jeremy Purton	Rakaia	Brian Connell
Emily Quested	Ilam	Gerry Brownlee
Kirsti Rawstron	List	
Shallyn Reeves	List	
Kereti Reihana	Waiariki	Mita Ririnui
Conrad Reyners	Rongotai	Annette King
James Rolfe	Rodney	Lockwood Smith
Joshua Ruru	List	
Nadene Rutland	List	
Simon Schofield	List	
Lukas Schroeter	List	Rodney Hide
Oliver Searle	Piako	Lindsay Tisch
Supriya Singh	List	Don Brash
Lauren Slaven	Banks Peninsula	Ruth Dyson
Alayna Smith	Rangitīkei	Simon Power
Rebekah Smith	List	
Todd Smith	Port Waikato	Paul Hutchison
Nicole Stanley	Waimakariri	Clayton Cosgrove
Kelsi Stayt	List	
Pauline Stensness	Hamilton West	Martin Gallagher
Cameron Stuart	Epsom	Richard Worth
Lafoaluga Tapaleao	List	
Tahau Thompson	Northcote	Ann Hartley
Sheena Thorn	Wigram	Jim Anderton
Aroha Tuatini	Te Tai Tonga	Mahara Okeroa
Jamie Turner	North Shore	Wayne Mapp
Shannon Tyler	List	
Ruchi Vyas	New Lynn	David Cunliffe
Timothy Walmsley	List	
Renae West	Waitakere	Lynne Pillay
Mary Whalley	Rotorua	Steve Chadwick
Amy Wharakura	Tainui	Nanaia Mahuta
Jade Wikitera	List	
Isaac Williams	Hamilton East	Dianne Yates
Jordan Williams	List	
Jonathan Wiseman	List	
Willa Young	Clutha-Southland	Bill English
Robyn Zwaan	List	

== 5th Youth Parliament (2007) ==
The 5th Youth Parliament took place from 8 to 11 July 2007. This was an extended period of days compared to previous years, as a trial to fit in more events and discussion. After 2007 Youth Parliament reverted to a two-day event.

=== Youth MPs 2007 ===
List means the individual is representing a List MP, while Electorate indicates they are representing an Electorate MP.

Youth MP	List/Electorate	Representing
Sam Abraham	List	Moana Mackey
Richard Aiolupotea	Māngere	Taito Phillip Field
Robert Anderson	Rimutaka	Paul Swain
Awhina Ashby	Northland	John Carter
James Barnett	List	Russell Fairbrother
Greg Bolton-Brown	List	Heather Roy
Gwilym Breese	Rongotai	Annette King
John Brinsley-Pirie	Dunedin North	Pete Hodgson
Ashley Brown	List	Shane Jones
Joel Brown	List	Dave Hereora
Sam Brown	Dunedin South	David Benson-Pope
Ed Brownlee	Northcote	Jonathan Coleman
Jeffrey Burson	Whangarei	Phil Heatley
Mania Campbell-Seymour	Waiariki	Te Ururoa Flavell
Jeny Cant	List	Dianne Yates
Jeff Carroll	List	Pita Paraone
Holly Chase	Mount Albert	Helen Clark
Lucy Child	Port Waikato	Paul Hutchison
Alex Clark	List	Jill Pettis
Amy Coatsworth	List	Sue Moroney
Elenoa Cook	Maungakiekie	Mark Gosche
Renée Cox	List	Lesley Soper
Luke Craven	List	Winston Peters
Johnny Crawford	Aoraki	Jo Goodhew
Ngahuia Crossman	List	Metiria Turei
Lara Delany	East Coast Bays	Murray McCully
Anna Devathasan	List	Tim Groser
Zoe Donald	List	Jeanette Fitzsimons
Shelley Duffy	List	Judy Turner
Josh Dunn	List	Kate Wilkinson
Nicky Dunn	List	Barbara Stewart
Kushla Dunning	List	Peter Brown
Ella Edginton	Hutt South	Trevor Mallard
Ariana Emery	Te Tai Hauāuru	Tariana Turia
Richard English	List	Ron Mark
Chelsie Foley	Hamilton West	Martin Gallagher
Alicia Gainsford	Wigram	Jim Anderton
Emma Gin	List	Nicky Wagner
Natalie Gow	Bay of Plenty	Tony Ryall
Jade Emmanuelle Gray	List	Margaret Wilson
Jordan Green	List	David Bennett
Steph Grogan	Clevedon	Judith Collins
Caitlin Grover	Nelson	Nick Smith
Kaitlyn Gulland	Banks Peninsula	Ruth Dyson
Livi Hall	Kaikoura	Colin King
Sam Hannagan	Coromandel	Sandra Goudie
Amanda Hillock	Ohariu-Belmont	Peter Dunne
Daisy Hunter	Waitakere	Lynne Pillay
Kelly Im	Mount Roskill	Phil Goff
Sam Jackson	Helensville	John Key
Sophia Johnson	Auckland Central	Judith Tizard
Emma Jones	List	Darien Fenton
Sophie Kalderimis	List	Mark Blumsky
Daphne Kalekale	List	Jackie Blue
Ashleigh Kapi	List	Ann Hartley
Shaun Kennedy	List	Brian Donnelly
Lauren Kilkolly	List	Rick Barker
John Kingi	List	Nandor Tanczos
Jason Larsen	List	Nathan Guy
Anna Lee	List	Richard Worth
Chuan-Zheng Lee	List	Mita Ririnui
Michelle Lee	List	Pansy Wong
Emily Legge	Rangitikei	Simon Power
Fale Lesa	Manurewa	George Hawkins
Daniel Luoni	Clutha-Southland	Bill English
Alannah Manson	Epsom	Rodney Hide
Megan Matthews	List	Doug Woolerton
Brennan McDonald	Tauranga	Bob Clarkson
Kimaya McIntosh	Taupo	Mark Burton
Anna Meikle	Taranaki-King Country	Shane Ardern
Nick Mitchell	Rodney	Lockwood Smith
Diana Mockford	List	Katherine Rich
Amelia Morgan	List	Georgina te Heuheu
Jaz Morris	List	Sue Kedgley
Nikkii Mott	Wairarapa	John Hayes
Dee Naidoo	List	Katrina Shanks
Michelle Nathan-Te Ao	Tainui	Nanaia Mahuta
Matthew Neary	Tāmaki	Allan Peachey
Susannah Neild	Palmerston North	Steve Maharey
Loren O'Sullivan	List	Maryan Street
Coral Panoho	Tāmaki Makaurau	Pita Sharples
Amy Pollard	New Lynn	David Cunliffe
Kate Primrose	Napier	Chris Tremain
Hope Puriri	Te Tai Tokerau	Hone Harawira
Isaac Rayner	List	Gordon Copeland
Shaun Ritchie	North Shore	Wayne Mapp
Pauline Robertson	Christchurch Central	Tim Barnett
Natalie Robinson	List	Dover Samuels
Jonathan Rowe	Ilam	Gerry Brownlee
Sandra Samuelu	Mana	Winnie Laban
Devon Sansbury	List	David Carter
Kritika Satija	List	Ashraf Choudhary
Saga Sifakula	List	Clem Simich
Anas Sirajur Raheem	Pakuranga	Maurice Williamson
James Sleep	List	Sue Bradford
Nicole Slight	Whanganui	Chester Borrows
Jen Smith	List	David Parker
Kirsty Smith	Piako	Lindsay Tisch
Kate Steel	List	Keith Locke
Jenny Suo	List	Paula Bennett
Rink Tacoma	Rakaia	Brian Connell
Mareta Taute	Te Tai Tonga	Mahara Okeroa
James Tawa	Christchurch East	Lianne Dalziel
Noema Te Hau	Ikaroa-Rāwhiti	Parekura Horomia
Mariarna Te Tai	List	Tau Henare
Jessie Templeton	West Coast-Tasman	Damien O'Connor
Penny Tipu	Invercargill	Eric Roy
Annika Tombleson	Tukituki	Craig Foss
Andreas Triandafilidis	Otaki	Darren Hughes
Eddie Tuiavil	Te Atatu	Chris Carter
Gareth Veale	Waimakariri	Clayton Cosgrove
James Walkinshaw	New Plymouth	Harry Duynhoven
Shaun Wallis	East Coast	Anne Tolley
Lana Walters	Rotorua	Steve Chadwick
Elisha Watson	Wellington Central	Marian Hobbs
Olivia West	List	Michael Cullen
Philip Wiley	Manukau East	Ross Robertson
Kate Willyams	Otago	Jacqui Dean
Kyla Wood	List	Chris Auchinvole
Seamus Woods	List	Chris Finlayson
Vinnie Wylie	List	Charles Chauvel

== 6th Youth Parliament (2010) ==
The 6th Youth Parliament took place on 6 and 7 July 2010. The mock bill focused on creating a single age of majority, that would make a single age for different activities to become lawful, such as drinking, driving and voting ages.

=== Youth MPs 2010 ===
List means the individual is representing a List MP, while Electorate indicates they are representing an Electorate MP.

Youth MP	List/Electorate	Representing
Thoraya Abdul-Rassol	List	Carmel Sepuloni
Seina Abera	Mana	Winnie Laban
Sylvie Admore	Helensville	John Key
Nadia Ali	Pakuranga	Maurice Williamson
Portia Allen	List	Kennedy Graham
Jordan Anderson	Napier	Chris Tremain
Tihema Baker	List	Mita Ririnui
Phoebe Balle	List	David Clendon
Callum Bell	List	Kate Wilkinson
Rawiri Biel	Hauraki-Waikato	Nanaia Mahuta
Ella Borrie	Waitaki	Jacqui Dean
Emily Bowden	Clutha-Southland	Bill English
Hazzel Brown	List	John Boscawen
Tay-Jana Brown	Taupō	Louise Upston
Jill Campbell	Wellington Central	Grant Robertson
Benjamin Carpenter	List	Rick Barker
Joseph Chamberlain	Christchurch East	Lianne Dalziel
Lynn Chen	List	Heather Roy
Billy Clemens	Christchurch Central	Brendon Burns
Allanah Colley	List	Jacinda Ardern
Andrew Coutts	List	Charles Chauvel
Justine Crabb	List	Tim Groser
Denise Matariki Cribb	Waiariki	Te Ururoa Flavell
Katya Curran	List	Michael Woodhouse
Mark Currie	Dunedin North	Pete Hodgson
Lincoln Dam	Te Atatū	Chris Carter
Sarah Darroch	List	Catherine Delahunty
Cory Dixon	Bay of Plenty	Tony Ryall
Lorna Donnelly	List	Nicky Wagner
Kerri Duthie	Papakura	Judith Collins
Amanda Eggers	List	Damien O'Connor
Talia Ellison	Dunedin South	Clare Curran
Roberta Faitele	Manurewa	George Hawkins
Tessa Farley	West Coast-Tasman	Chris Auchinvole
Kieren Gera	Ōhariu	Peter Dunne
Hayley Gilchrist	List	Shane Jones
Amy Halligan	Kaikōura	Colin King
Anna Hamer-Adams	Palmerston North	Iain Lees-Galloway
Lisa Hansen	Wairarapa	John Hayes
Neelam Hari	Hunua	Paul Hutchison
Joshua Harvey	Mt Albert	David Shearer
Michael Hawley	Hamilton East	David Bennett
Carolyn Henry	Northland	John Carter
Benjamin Hingston	List	Steve Chadwick
Camilla Holmes	Waikato	Lindsay Tisch
Kelsey Illing	List	Lynne Pillay
Cameron Jacob-Sauer	List	Carol Beaumont
Caleb Jago-Ward	Ōtaki	Nathan Guy
Nathan Jones	Wigram	Jim Anderton
Vishakham Joseph	Whangarei	Phil Heatley
Shail Kaushal	List	Rajen Prasad
Abbey Kendall	East Coast Bays	Murray McCully
Christopher Kennedy	List	David Parker
Ben Keren	List	Chris Finlayson
Brittany Kershaw	Tukituki	Craig Foss
Stuart Kruger	Invercargill	Eric Roy
Benazir Kumar	Port Hills	Ruth Dyson
Hannah Lai	List	Cam Calder
Freeman Lambert-Ehu	Hamilton West	Tim Macindoe
Meaghan Li	List	Raymond Huo
Danielle Lucas	Tauranga	Simon Bridges
Emma Lucas	East Coast	Anne Tolley
Harry Lusk	List	Keith Locke
Amelia MacDonald	List	Phil Twyford
Danielle Maclean	Auckland Central	Nikki Kaye
Alasdair MacLeod	Rongotai	Annette King
Thomas Maharaj	Hutt South	Trevor Mallard
Siale Mann	North Shore	Wayne Mapp
Alice Markie	Northcote	Jonathan Coleman
Bethany Mathers	List	Russel Norman
Rory McCourt	List	Moana Mackey
Jack McDonald	List	Sue Kedgley
Lydia McKinnon	List	Sue Moroney
Edward McKnight	Epsom	Rodney Hide
Javier Mihaere	List	Tau Henare
Kātene Morris	Te Tai Hauāuru	Tariana Turia
Paige Muggeridge	New Plymouth	Jonathan Young
Te Niiwai Mutu	Te Tai Tokerau	Hone Harawira
Shameela Nassery	List	Ashraf Choudhary
Lisa Nyman-Ambrose	List	Metiria Turei
Johny O'Donnell	List	Maryan Street
Sarah Oh	List	Melissa Lee
Turei-Haamiora Ormsby	Te Tai Tonga	Rahui Katene
Brittany Packer	List	Kevin Hague
Vainga Pahulu	Tāmaki	Allan Peachey
Rakaitemania Parata Gardiner	List	Katrina Shanks
Hineteariki Parata-Walker	Ikaroa-Rāwhiti	Parekura Horomia
Ben Porteous	Rodney	Lockwood Smith
Gareth Power-Gordon	Taranaki-King Country	Shane Ardern
Natasha Pratt	List	Steven Joyce
Cameron Price	List	Stuart Nash
Rebecca Quansah	List	Jackie Blue
Akash Rampal	List	Kanwaljit Singh Bakshi
Georgia Robertson	Rangitata	Jo Goodhew
Timothy Robinson	List	Aaron Gilmore
Marietalini Ropeti-Iupeli	Māngere	William Sio
Anna Rumbold	Ilam	Gerry Brownlee
Sharanya Sankaran	List	Roger Douglas
Fleur Schouten	Nelson	Nick Smith
Maxwell Scott	List	Hekia Parata
Sunil Sharma	Waitakere	Paula Bennett
Hannah Singh	Selwyn	Amy Adams
Monisha Singh	Maungakiekie	Sam Lotu-Iiga
Giovanna Sua	Manukau East	Ross Robertson
Alexander Summerlee	List	David Carter
Tania Tapsell	Rotorua	Todd McClay
Tony Joseph Tautari	List	Kelvin Davis
Chelsea Torrance	Rimutaka	Chris Hipkins
Kataraina Tuatini	List	Georgina te Heuheu
Holly Tullett	Waimakariri	Clayton Cosgrove
Shruthi Vijayakumar	Mt Roskill	Phil Goff
Joel Walsham	New Lynn	David Cunliffe
Jack Watling	List	David Garrett
Eden Webster	Tāmaki Makaurau	Pita Sharples
Kieran Welsby	List	Darren Hughes
Shaun Welsh	Rangitīkei	Simon Power
Robert Whitefield	List	Paul Quinn
Caitlin Wiseman	Coromandel	Sandra Goudie
Joseph Xulué	Botany	Pansy Wong
Jenny Zhang	List	Darien Fenton
Jiaxin Zhou	Whanganui	Chester Borrows
Rick Zwaan	List	Gareth Hughes

== 7th Youth Parliament (2013) ==
The 7th Youth Parliament was held on 16 and 17 July 2013. The mock bill topic was Electoral Reform, with discussions about reducing the voting age, introducing electronic voting, making voting compulsory and extending the Term of Parliament taking place.

=== Youth MPs 2013 ===
List means the individual is representing a List MP, while Electorate indicates they are representing an Electorate MP.

Youth MP	List/Electorate	Representing
Tama Abraham	Te Atatū	Phil Twyford
Olivia Adam	Clutha-Southland	Bill English
Jack Alison	List	Moana Mackey
Gul Agha Alizadah	Ilam	Gerry Brownlee
Faaiu Anae-Tunai	Māngere	William Sio
Emily Anselmi	List	Barbara Stewart
Olivia Ashby-Cartwright	Whangarei	Phil Heatley
Seamus Barnett	Palmerston North	Iain Lees-Galloway
Jake Benson	North Shore	Maggie Barry
Ellie Bishop	Epsom	John Banks
Monty Blackwood	Whanganui	Chester Borrows
Kaukiterangi Blair	Te Tai Tonga	Rino Tirikatene
Jillian Bleasdale	List	Andrew Little
Liam Booth	List	Hekia Parata
Rosie Bowman	Rimutaka	Chris Hipkins
Eden Brown	Waitaki	Jacqui Dean
Jordan Brown	Tāmaki Makaurau	Pita Sharples
Dean Buckley	List	Mojo Mathers
Courtney Buckman	Rangitata	Jo Goodhew
Daisy Cadigan	Rongotai	Annette King
Alexi Carlier	Tāmaki	Simon O'Connor
Amber Coates-Reid	Mt Albert	David Shearer
Yanni Cowie	List	Denis O'Rourke
Angela Curtis	Auckland Central	Nikki Kaye
Mark Davis	Hamilton West	Tim Macindoe
Hanna Deal	Port Hills	Ruth Dyson
Rugved Deshpande	List	Rajen Prasad
James Devereaux	Waitakere	Paula Bennett
Peniata Endemann	List	Darien Fenton
Jay Evett	Hutt South	Trevor Mallard
Michael Fryer	Ōtaki	Nathan Guy
Corey Fuimaono	List	Jan Logie
Cian Gardner	List	Sue Moroney
Kate Gardner	Dunedin South	Clare Curran
Rahul George	List	Richard Prosser
Patrick Gerard	List	Steffan Browning
Calum Gray	Selwyn	Amy Adams
Brad Grootelaar	List	Clayton Cosgrove
Jacinta Gulasekharam	Rangitīkei	Ian McKelvie
Samuel Hart	List	Chris Finlayson
Allanah Hartley	Waikato	Lindsay Tisch
Cameron Haworth	List	Steven Joyce
Ethan Hill	List	Chris Auchinvole
Victoria Holyoake	New Plymouth	Jonathan Young
Clementine Howe	List	Asenati Taylor
Annie Huang	List	Jian Yang
Michelle Huang	List	Raymond Huo
Stella Ivory	Taupō	Louise Upston
Matthew Jackson	Northcote	Jonathan Coleman
Prabhjit Johal	Hunua	Paul Hutchison
Injy Johnstone	List	David Parker
Zarna Jones	List	Tracey Martin
Gursharn Kaur	List	Kanwaljit Singh Bakshi
Shivon Kiew	Pakuranga	Maurice Williamson
Kristina Kim	List	Melissa Lee
Eru Kapa-Kingi	Te Tai Tokerau	Hone Harawira
Andre Knops	List	David Carter
Jacobi Kohu-Morris	List	Winston Peters
Jake Lamkum	List	Alfred Ngaro
Adam Lawton	East Coast	Anne Tolley
Sarah Lee	Rodney	Mark Mitchell
Isabella Lenihan-Ikin	List	Russel Norman
Malinna Liang	List	Tau Henare
Callum Lo	Tukituki	Craig Foss
Georgina Lomax-Sawyers	List	Kevin Hague
Lafoai Luaitalo	Maungakiekie	Sam Lotu-Iiga
Danielle Lusk	List	Metiria Turei
Peter MacClure	List	Tim Groser
Raven Maeder	List	Gareth Hughes
Lewis Marchant	Taranaki-King Country	Shane Ardern
Mungo Mason	Tauranga	Simon Bridges
Emily McCarthy	Bay of Plenty	Tony Ryall
Teaonui McKenzie	Te Tai Hauāuru	Tariana Turia
Rachel McLean-Dewes	List	Catherine Delahunty
Holly McNabb	Waimakariri	Kate Wilkinson
Jesse Medcalf	East Coast Bays	Murray McCully
Kaya Miriau	List	Denise Roche
Emma Moffett	Wigram	Megan Woods
George Moon	List	Julie Anne Genter
Bokyong Mun	Dunedin North	David Clark
Julia Musgrave	List	Carol Beaumont
Melania Napa'a	Manukau East	Ross Robertson
Madeleine Nash	List	Katrina Shanks
Abbas Nazari	List	Kennedy Graham
Jessica Palairet	Wellington Central	Grant Robertson
Ella Palsenbarg	Papakura	Judith Collins
Ebony Peeni	List	Shane Jones
Jaleighquar Rahiri	Ikaroa-Rāwhiti	Parekura Horomia
Thomas Rees	List	Paul Foster-Bell
Hart Reynolds	List	Jacinda Ardern
Mark Robilliard	Rotorua	Todd McClay
Danielle Rolls	Napier	Chris Tremain
Tom Rutherford	List	Brendan Horan
Chris Ryan	Botany	Jami-Lee Ross
Patrick Savill	Nelson	Nick Smith
Samantha Scahill	Northland	Mike Sabin
Tim Shiels	List	Michael Woodhouse
Jessica Sinclair	Wairarapa	John Hayes
Anchal Singh	List	Holly Walker
Simarjit Singh	Mana	Kris Faafoi
Charm Skinner	Hauraki-Waikato	Nanaia Mahuta
Caitlin Smart	List	David Clendon
Samuel Smith	Invercargill	Eric Roy
Samuel Stead	List	Paul Goldsmith
Sara Sterne	Kaikōura	Colin King
Jack Stringer	Christchurch Central	Nicky Wagner
Ashley Stuart	West Coast-Tasman	Damien O'Connor
Jacinta Taliau'li	Manurewa	Louisa Wall
Henry Thompson	List	Andrew Williams
Michelle Too	Ōhariu	Peter Dunne
Teri Tuuau	List	Cam Calder
Anikka Walker	List	Maryan Street
Kura Waller	Waiariki	Te Ururoa Flavell
Brooke Waterson	Helensville	John Key
Cameron Webster	New Lynn	David Cunliffe
Bridget White	List	Eugenie Sage
Oliver Wilding	Hamilton East	David Bennett
Amy Williams	Coromandel	Scott Simpson
Madeleine Williams	List	Claudette Hauiti
Hannah Yang	Mt Roskill	Phil Goff
Alex Zorn	Christchurch East	Lianne Dalziel

== 8th Youth Parliament (2016) ==
=== Youth MPs 2016 ===
List means the individual is representing a List MP, while Electorate indicates they are representing an Electorate MP.

Youth MP	List/Electorate	Representing
Tebarae Amuera	List	Tracey Martin
Hinepounamu Apanui-Barr	List	Marama Fox
Bianca Bailey	Helensville	John Key
Kane Bassett	List	Bill English
Leah Louise Bell	Taranaki-King Country	Barbara Kuriger
Isabella Biggs	Wairarapa	Alastair Scott
Jessica Boniface	New Plymouth	Jonathan Young
Dharma Bratley	Rodney	Mark Mitchell
Ruby Bridge	List	James Shaw
Setareh Brown	Whangarei	Shane Reti
Anthony Bunnik	List	Sue Moroney
James Busch	Upper Harbour	Paula Bennett
Creedence Cable	List	David Parker
Danielle Carson	List	Ria Bond
Kate Chew-Lit	List	Jan Logie
Beth Clearwater	List	David Clendon
Daniella Clements-Levi	North Shore	Maggie Barry
Chantelle Cobby	Rotorua	Todd McClay
Coral Cooper	Ikaroa-Rāwhiti	Meka Whaitiri
Alexander Dante Croft	Northcote	Jonathan Coleman
Kiri Isabelle Crossland	Hamilton West	Tim Macindoe
Charlotte Cumming	List	Eugenie Sage
Aaron Dahmen	Tāmaki	Simon O'Connor
Michael Anil Daya-Winterbottom	Papakura	Judith Collins
Chloe Destrieux	Manurewa	Louisa Wall
Tei Henson Driver	Christchurch Central	Nicky Wagner
Jia Dua	Mount Roskill	Phil Goff
Hamish William Duncan	Dunedin South	Clare Curran
Te Moana nui A Kiwa Sergo Ross Erueti-Newman	List	Chris Finlayson
Levi Farrell	Kelston	Carmel Sepuloni
Thomas Callum Findlater	Invercargill	Sarah Dowie
Holly Elizabeth Fletcher	Waimakariri	Matt Doocey
Finnian Galbraith	Mana	Kris Faafoi
Ngahaki Gardiner	Waiariki	Te Ururoa Flavell
Joshua Gill	List	Catherine Delahunty
Selena Gordon	Manukau East	Jenny Salesa
Katie Gotlieb	List	Metiria Turei
Aimee-Chantelle Gough	Te Tai Tonga	Rino Tirikatene
Sophie Harrison	List	Richard Prosser
Kelvyn Henare	List	Pita Paraone
Te Ihingaarangi (Haven) Henare-Heke	List	Marama Davidson
Ben Henderson	Rangitīkei	Ian McKelvie
Justice-Te Amorangi Hetaraka	Te Tai Tokerau	Kelvin Davis
Jake Hoffart	List	Clayton Cosgrove
Grace Holmes	Hutt South	Trevor Mallard
Vivien Huang	List	Jian Yang
Huia Jackson	List	Steffan Browning
Stephen Jones	List	Kennedy Graham
Karan Kalsi	New Lynn	David Cunliffe
Daniel Tepai Tamatoa Kelly	Tukituki	Craig Foss
Gabriella Keys	List	Denise Roche
Keziah Niamh Lawes	List	Steven Joyce
Teresa Lee	List	Jacinda Ardern
Ilene Lei	List	Darroch Ball
Jacob Lerner	List	Paul Goldsmith
Samir Loumachi	List	Jono Naylor
Dion Patrick Mahoney	Port Hills	Ruth Dyson
Veronica Jayne Manning	Coromandel	Scott Simpson
Tangihia Te Aonga Mai Chaeli-Tequila Manuel	Te Tai Hauāuru	Adrian Rurawhe
Tim Marshall	Selwyn	Amy Adams
Jaistone Mataio	List	Hekia Parata
Abigail May	List	Barbara Stewart
Eve Louise McCallum	List	Michael Woodhouse
Stefan Robert McClean	List	Brett Hudson
Connor McCormick	Hunua	Andrew Bayly
Kasey McDonnell	Wellington Central	Grant Robertson
Carragh McKay	List	Clayton Cosgrove
Peter McKenzie	Rongotai	Annette King
Michael Tui McLeod	List	Andrew Little
Rose McLeod	Rangitata	Jo Goodhew
Hannah Monigatti	Epsom	David Seymour
William Alexander Alessi Muir	Ilam	Gerry Brownlee
Georgia Muller	Te Atatū	Phil Twyford
Ngahuia Muru	East Coast	Anne Tolley
Rebecca Newman	Napier	Stuart Nash
Noella Ishimwe Niyonzima	Rimutaka	Chris Hipkins
Nisha Novell	Hamilton East	David Bennett
Ogonna Favor Nweke	List	Melissa Lee
Summer O'Dwyer	List	Paul Foster-Bell
Christopher Oleva-Tanuvasa	Māngere	William Sio
Amy Palmer	List	Jo Hayes
Dylan Parshotam	List	Parmjeet Parmar
Keegan Bruce Phipps	Nelson	Nick Smith
Isaac Proctor	Botany	Jami-Lee Ross
Kaleb Paul Reid	Waikato	Lindsay Tisch
Javan William Rose	Taupō	Louise Upston
Stacey Rose	List	Denis O'Rourke
Stephanie-Anne Ross	Clutha-Southland	Todd Barclay
Timothy Douglas Rowe	Whanganui	Chester Borrows
Tim Angelo Ryan	Kaikōura	Stuart Smith
Nina Gabriella Santos	Auckland Central	Nikki Kaye
Hope Dianne Sexton	List	Ron Mark
Kii Winston Tijani Small	Northland	Winston Peters
Fenella Smith	List	Maureen Pugh
Katrina Sneath	List	Mojo Mathers
Fa'ataualofa Abbytailor So'olefai	List	Alfred Ngaro
Kelly Stitely	Dunedin North	David Clark
Alexis Sutherland	List	David Carter
Thomas Bethell Swinburn	Maungakiekie	Sam Lotu-Iiga
Britnee Paige Tapara	List	Chris Bishop
Cheyenne Te Haara-Barr	Wigram	Megan Woods
Crystal Te Moananui	Hauraki-Waikato	Nanaia Mahuta
Jaimee Melissa Thomas	List	Kevin Hague
Hugo Andrew Beard Thompson	Tauranga	Simon Bridges
Emma Elizabeth Tompkins	West Coast-Tasman	Damien O'Connor
Ellen Kathleen Travis	List	Fletcher Tabuteau
Keryn Emma Tubbs	Waitaki	Jacqui Dean
Bethany Walters	Christchurch East	Poto Williams
Zhicheng Wang	East Coast Bays	Murray McCully
Gennevieve White	Mount Albert	David Shearer
Julia Beatrice Wiener	List	Julie Anne Genter
Nathan Wilson	Pakuranga	Maurice Williamson
Te Puawai Poukaria Reba Wilson-Leahy	List	Nuk Korako
Awatea Irihapeti Te Rerenga Whetu Wihongi	Tāmaki Makaurau	Peeni Henare
Emily Rose Woodhouse	List	Kanwaljit Singh Bakshi
Grahame Elliott Woods	Bay of Plenty	Todd Muller
Cameron Wright	Ōhariu	Peter Dunne
Krystal Wright	Ōtaki	Nathan Guy
Ruth Wright	Palmerston North	Iain Lees-Galloway
Jenny Wu	List	Mahesh Bindra
Run Qi Zhu	List	Gareth Hughes

== 9th Youth Parliament (2019) ==
The 9th Youth Parliament was held on 16 and 17 July 2019. The mock bill was the Sustainable Energy Bill, which debated introducing strong targets to move New Zealand to renewable energy alternatives and lower emissions.

This term of Youth Parliament made headlines on multiple occasions. Most notably, a successful motion to declare a climate emergency was moved by Chlöe Swarbrick's Youth MP, Luke Wijohn. Swarbrick herself had unsuccessfully attempted to move the same motion in Parliament weeks earlier.

Youth MP, Shaneel Shavneel Lal founded the movement to end conversion therapy in New Zealand at 9th Youth Parliament after their speech during the general debate. Their speech received a standing ovation at Parliament.

The event also made headlines after it was revealed that Deputy Speaker Anne Tolley had reduced Youth MP Lily Dorrance to tears after shutting down her speech on youth suicide as Dorrance was reading from her notes, which Tolley believed was against standing orders. Multiple Youth MPs raised points of order stating that this was not against standing orders as they believed there was no such rule. Dorrance later said she felt "humiliated", and Tolley subsequently apologised to both Dorrance and Speaker Trevor Mallard.

Later in 2019 but still during the tenureship of the Youth MP programme, three Youth MPs, Wijohn, Arie Faber and Lily Chen, representing Swarbrick, Jan Logie and Golriz Ghahraman respectively, were ejected from Parliament's public gallery and issued with a twelve-month ban from Parliament grounds after interrupting the proceedings of the house by loudly verbally protesting the government's position on the occupation at Ihumātao. Swarbrick, Logie and Ghahraman later stated they disapproved of their Youth MPs actions.

=== Youth MPs 2019 ===
List means the individual is representing a List MP, while Electorate indicates they are representing an Electorate MP.

Youth MP	List/Electorate	Representing
Lara Albert	List	Paul Goldsmith
Puspa Waiata Barua	List	Shane Jones
Maia Berryman-Kamp	List	Fletcher Tabuteau
Fale'aka Bloomfield	Mt Albert	Jacinda Ardern
Melissa Bonilla Casanas	List	Michael Woodhouse
Verity Brogden	West Coast-Tasman	Damien O'Connor
Jack Buchan	Dunedin North	David Clark
Watene Moana Campbell	Te Tai Tonga	Rino Tirikatene
Freya Champion	Christchurch Central	Duncan Webb
Andrew Chen	Auckland Central	Nikki Kaye
Lily Chen	List	Golriz Ghahraman
Sean Chen	Helensville	Chris Penk
Isabella Copinga	Invercargill	Sarah Dowie
James Cowan	Tukituki	Lawrence Yule
Arie Tiniwhetu Dargaville Rehua	Hauraki-Waikato	Nanaia Mahuta
Christian Dennison	Rimutaka	Chris Hipkins
Aksheen Dhillon	Tāmaki	Simon O'Connor
Kelly Ding	List	Raymond Huo
Katie Donald	Taupō	Louise Upston
Lily Dorrance	List	David Carter
Joshua Doubtfire	List	Melissa Lee
Anna Douglas	List	Kieran McAnulty
Molly Doyle	List	James Shaw
Shiquille Duval	List	Willow-Jean Prime
Rawhiti Erstich Coles	Te Tai Tokerau	Kelvin Davis
Dazhonavah Siaifoi Faaumu	Kelston	Carmel Sepuloni
Arie Faber	List	Jan Logie
Mackenzie Fallow	List	Liz Craig
Raymond Feng	List	Parmjeet Parmar
Jamal Fiso	Rongotai	Paul Eagle
Madison Flannery	List	Mark Patterson
Will Ford	Hunua	Andrew Bayly
Sarah Fraser	Napier	Stuart Nash
Chantal Gallagher	New Lynn	Deborah Russell
Ali Emily Gammeter	Whanganui	Harete Hipango
Nishita Jitesh Ganatra	List	Kanwaljit Singh Bakshi
Anmol Ghuman	Papakura	Judith Collins
Ethan Griffiths	List	Andrew Little
Sophie Handford	Mana	Kris Faafoi
Jamie Harper	Ōtaki	Nathan Guy
Dan Harward Jones	Ōhāriu	Greg O'Connor
Kate Hatley	Botany	Jami-Lee Ross
Saakshi Hegde	Mount Roskill	Michael Wood
Azaria Howell	List	Eugenie Sage
Cha'nel Kaa-Luke	Port Hills	Ruth Dyson
Fania Kapao	Te Atatū	Phil Twyford
Anya Khalid	List	Marja Lubeck
Coco King	List	Jenny Marcroft
Clement Kong	List	Nicola Willis
Maria Kopilevich	East Coast Bays	Erica Stanford
Te Rina Kotara	List	Jo Hayes
Shaneel Shavneel Lal	Manukau East	Jenny Salesa
Jordan Lapish	Upper Harbour	Paula Bennett
Lily Lewis	Wairarapa	Alastair Scott
Rayan Lootah	List	Trevor Mallard
James Macey	New Plymouth	Jonathan Young
Anna Manning	East Coast	Anne Tolley
Ella Martin	List	Tracey Martin
Jessica McKnight	Maungakiekie	Denise Lee
Jerome Mika	List	Willie Jackson
Jackson Minnear	Waitaki	Jacqui Dean
Joy Mitchell	List	Clayton Mitchell
Ethan Nemeroff	List	Winston Peters
Taylor Renata Nikora	Te Tai Hauāuru	Adrian Rurawhe
Isabelle Oosterbroek	List	Jamie Strange
Sam Oxford	Coromandel	Scott Simpson
Anaru Palmer	Waiariki	Tāmati Coffey
Gwen Parallag	List	Julie Anne Genter
William Paterson	Rodney	Mark Mitchell
Matthew Penno	Ilam	Gerry Brownlee
Charise Perez	Wellington Central	Grant Robertson
Matthew Poša	List	Paulo Garcia
Meghshyam Prakash	Northland	Matt King
Benjamin Prince	List	Darroch Ball
Maia Rahurahu	Rotorua	Todd McClay
Rebekah Okeroa Raihania	Ikaroa-Rāwhiti	Meka Whaitiri
Nikita Raman	Hamilton East	David Bennett
Claire Randall	Northcote	Dan Bidois
Materoa Rewiri	List	Kiritapu Allan
Teresa Rodger	Christchurch East	Poto Williams
Valentyn Santhara	Epsom	David Seymour
T.C. Koroheke Satele	List	David Parker
Eperu Sa'u	List	Ginny Andersen
Phoebe Scarsbrook	Rangitata	Andrew Falloon
Ishie Sharma	List	Priyanca Radhakrishnan
Harper Smith	Waikato	Tim Van de Molen
Ben Sokimi	Tauranga	Simon Bridges
Logan Stadnyk	Dunedin South	Clare Curran
Flynn Symonds	Whangārei	Shane Reti
Gabriel Tagi	List	Agnes Loheni
May Takahashi	List	Maureen Pugh
Tristan Taquet	Clutha-Southland	Hamish Walker
Iris Taramai	Wigram	Megan Woods
Samuel Taylor	Bay of Plenty	Todd Muller
Noelene Tewhakaara	List	Jan Tinetti
Leighton Thompson	List	Gareth Hughes
Jennifer Prapaiporn Thonrithi	List	Anahila Kanongata'a-Suisuiki
Te Mana Tiakiwai	Tāmaki Makaurau	Peeni Henare
Jess Timmo	List	Jo Luxton
Ellie Tizzard	Waimakariri	Matt Doocey
Xavier Turner	Taranaki-King Country	Barbara Kuriger
Katelyn Twiss	Selwyn	Amy Adams
Alakihifo Vailala	Māngere	Aupito William Sio
Taa Ramsay Vili	Manurewa	Louisa Wall
Makayla Wadsworth	List	Angie Warren-Clark
Esther Walters	Nelson	Nick Smith
Chyna West-John	Hutt South	Chris Bishop
Pounamu Wharehinga	List	Marama Davidson
Bradley White	Kaikōura	Stuart Smith
Luke Wijohn	List	Chlöe Swarbrick
Belle Willemstein	List	Ron Mark
Shaye Witehira	Palmerston North	Iain Lees-Galloway
William Wood	Rangitīkei	Ian McKelvie
Tayla Woolley	North Shore	Maggie Barry
Mia Wright	List	Nicky Wagner
Shine Wu	List	Brett Hudson
Hayley Xie	Pakuranga	Simeon Brown
Henry Yao	Hamilton West	Tim Macindoe
Freya Young	List	Tutehounuku Korako
Sally Zhang	List	Jian Yang

== 10th Youth Parliament (2022) ==
The 10th Youth Parliament was held on 19 and 20 July 2022.

=== Youth MPs 2022 ===
List means the individual is representing a List MP, while Electorate indicates they are representing an Electorate MP.

Youth MP	List/Electorate	Representing
Ali Ahmad	New Lynn	Deborah Russel
Mitchell Aitkinson	Northcote	Shanan Halbert
Nicolas Alvarez Rey-Virag	Dunedin	David Clark
Sarah-Joy Aruwa	Panmure-Ōtāhuhu	Jenny Salesa
Fano Asiata	List	Damien Smith
Zara Barlow	List	Julie Anne Genter
Hannah Bautista	List	Paul Goldsmith
William Bell-Purchas	Mount Albert	Jacinda Ardern
Samantha Bergin	West Coast-Tasman	Damien O'Connor
Lucia-Tui Bernards	List	Ayesha Verrall
Aryan Bhatnagar	Botany	Christopher Luxon
Ben Brown	Rongotai	Paul Eagle
Ruby Buffett-Bray	Te Atatū	Phil Twyford
Mairangi Campbell	Ikaroa-Rāwhiti	Meka Whaitiri
Rihari Campbell-Collier	List	Elizabeth Kerekere
Megan Cartwright	Tāmaki	Simon O'Connor
Tom Catto	Bay of Plenty	Todd Muller
Bidhya Chhetri	Ilam	Sarah Pallett
Amelia Chitty	List	Helen White
Cory Clement	List	Toni Severin
Hillary Cooper	Waimakariri	Matt Doocey
Charlotte Cornwall	Papakura	Judith Collins
Benjamin Cosford	Tauranga	Sam Uffindell
Josh Craig	Wigram	Megan Woods
Catelyn Dahlberg	List	Karen Chhour
Rei Denee	List	Jan Logie
Victoria Ding	List	Gerry Brownlee
Aidan Donoghue	Hamilton West	Gaurav Sharma
Mukai Duder-Hura	Te Tai Tokerau	Kelvin Davis
Kareena Dunlop	List	Michael Woodhouse
Matt Fisken	List	Nicole McKee
Edna Fonua	Maungakiekie	Priyanca Radhakrishnan
Cam Fraser	Taieri	Ingrid Leary
Meghana Gaddam	Waikato	Tim van de Molen
Brylee Gibbes	Taranaki-King Country	Barbara Kuriger
Sophia Goodrich	Taupō	Louise Upston
Tyler Groenewald	List	James McDowall
Tyissa Hape	Northland	Willow-Jean Prime
Isabella Hargreaves	Wellington Central	Grant Robertson
Thomas Hayward	List	David Bennett
Keelan Heesterman	Tukituki	Anna Lorck
Khail Hema	Remutaka	Chris Hipkins
Willow Heron	List	Marja Lubeck
Aorangi Hetaraka	Whangārei	Emily Henderson
Alex Hewison	Christchurch East	Poto Williams
Bobbie Hira	Selwyn	Nicola Grigg
Joel Holdsworth	List	Eugenie Sage
Jamal Howell	List	Ibrahim Omer
Rebecca Hufflett	List	Chris Baillie
Meg Hunter	Wairarapa	Kieran McAnulty
Will Irvine	Nelson	Rachel Boyack
James Isa	List	Nicola Willis
James Ivamy	List	Maureen Pugh
Sterling Jeffery	List	Shane Reti
Jack Jessep	Rangitata	Jo Luxton
Ethan Johnston	Whangaparāoa	Mark Mitchell
Raukura Kahukiwa	List	Tāmati Coffey
Aukaha Kakau-Dickson	Waiariki	Rawiri Waititi
Ebony Kalin	Whanganui	Steph Lewis
Trinity Kapeli	List	David Parker
Kahurangi Katipa-Maikuku	List	Angela Roberts
Amandeep Kaur	List	Angie Warren-Clark
Ravneet Kaur	Takanini	Neru Leavasa
Armani Capone Heremaia Kuri	List	Teanau Tuiono
Izzy Law	Invercargill	Penny Simmonds
Alicia Lemmer	East Coast Bays	Erica Stanford
Tom Little	Napier	Stuart Nash
Tamara Livingstone	Kaikōura	Stuart Smith
Albie Lockie	Auckland Central	Chlöe Swarbrick
Bethanie Luke	List	Andrew Little
Rhiannon Mackie	Hutt South	Ginny Andersen
Maya McNeill	Pakuranga	Simeon Brown
Anoushka Majmudar	List	Ricardo Menendez March
Te Horowai Mapapalangi	Rotorua	Todd McClay
Elijah Mareko	Mana	Barbara Edmonds
Ayolabi Martins	Upper Harbour	Vanushi Walters
Zoe McElrea	List	Mark Cameron
Alice McIntosh	List	Liz Craig
Raiha Mihaka	Te Tai Hauāuru	Adrian Rurawhe
Ivy Mitchell	North Shore	Simon Watts
Iona Mortimer	List	James Shaw
Ruby Narayan	Manurewa	Arena Williams
Rosalie Norton	Hamilton East	Jamie Strange
Epeli Ole	Kelston	Carmel Sepuloni
Luke Orbell	List	Debbie Ngarewa-Packer
Yoonie Park	List	Melissa Lee
Lily Pearce	List	Jan Tinetti
George Pedley	List	Harete Hipango
Grace Pickering	List	Naisi Chen
Hemi Pinfold-Whanga	Palmerston North	Tangi Utikere
Cedar Porteous	List	Kris Faafoi
Noor Randhawa	List	Camilla Belich
Hariata Tanetinorau Rangi	Hauraki-Waikato	Nanaia Mahuta
Abhishek Ravichandran	Mount Roskill	Michael Wood
Ethan Reille	List	Rachel Brooking
Ihorangi Reweti-Peters	Te Tai Tonga	Rino Tirikatene
Quinn Rimmer	List	Simon Court
Ethan Rogacion	List	Marama Davidson
Hamish Ross	List	Chris Bishop
Humairaa Saheb	Māngere	William Sio
Olive Scurr	Waitaki	Jacqui Dean
Scarlet Shannon	Christchurch Central	Duncan Webb
Sumita Singh	East Coast	Kiri Allan
Alyssa Smaling	Ōtaki	Terisa Ngobi
Miriama Soutar	List	Lemauga Lydia Sosene
Joshua Taefu	Ōhāriu	Greg O'Connor
Rereahu Tamaki-Maguire	Tāmaki Makaurau	Peeni Henare
Quintin Te Maari	List	Willie Jackson
Tremayne Thompson	Port Waikato	Andrew Bayly
Luke Thomson	Southland	Joseph Mooney
Caeden Tipler	List	Golriz Ghahraman
Thomas Tito-Green	New Plymouth	Glen Bennett
Lucia Tod	Banks Peninsula	Tracey McLellan
Lilii Tuila	List	Anahila Kanongata'a-Suisuiki
Anna Tukuitoga	Coromandel	Scott Simpson
Daisy Tumataroa	Rangitīkei	Ian McKelvie
Jade Varney	Epsom	David Seymour
Tingmeng Wang	List	Brooke van Velden
Simon Xiao	Kaipara ki Mahurangi	Chris Penk
Layba Zubair	List	Trevor Mallard

== 11th Youth Parliament (2025) ==
The 11th Youth Parliament was held on 1 and 2 July 2025. The tenure began on 28 April 2025 and ended on 29 August 2025. 123 young people, between the ages of 16 and 18, were selected by MPs to participate as Youth MPs. Additionally, 20 young people, between the ages of 16 and 24, were selected by a panel to participate as Youth Press Gallery Members.

The event was shrouded in controversy and made headlines after multiple Youth MPs and Labour Party leader Chris Hipkins called the event out for supposed 'Censorship' in General Debate Speech scripts. The supposed censorship surrounded criticism of the government among other things. The coverage of the event got to the point where Minister for Youth James Meager published a statement which suggested there was no Censorship and that the emails from the Ministry of Youth Development (MYD) were only suggestions. On July 2nd, Youth MPs from governing parties also held a press conference and refuted the claims of the other Youth MPs, suggesting there was no censorship. The incidents garnered press attention across the country, and involved MPs from both sides of the house, the MYD and several Youth MPs for the duration of the event.

=== Youth MPs 2025 ===
List means the individual is representing a List MP, while Electorate indicates they are representing an Electorate MP.

Youth MP	List/Electorate	Representing
Aanya Shukla	List	Priyanca Radhakrishnan
Aarthi Candadai	List	Nicola Willis
Abby Plom	Botany	Christopher Luxon
Adi Shirlal	New Lynn	Paulo Garcia
Aiden Mill	List	Jo Luxton
Angus Noone	List	Mark Patterson
Ani Retemeyer	List	Andrew Hoggard
Ankita Pilo	Southland	Joseph Mooney
Archie Crayford	List	David Parker
Arden Morunga	Hamilton East	Ryan Hamilton
Aroa Al Masri	Ōtaki	Tim Costley
Arunita Vaotuua	Mana	Barbara Edmonds
Bede McCullough	List	Kieran McAnulty
Ben Coull	List	Nicole McKee
Benjamin Kingsford	List	Jan Tinetti
Brynn Pierce	List	Andy Foster
Cecilia Lin	Whangaparāoa	Mark Mitchell
Charbel Alboutros	Takanini	Rima Nakhle
Chelsea Brown	North Shore	Simon Watts
Chelsea Reti	List	Hūhana Lyndon
Chris Proctor	Tukituki	Catherine Wedd
Clay Blakeman	Northland	Grant McCallum
Cohen Ace	Whangārei	Shane Reti
Daisy Feagaiga	List	Marama Davidson
Daman Kumar	List	Ricardo Menéndez March
Daniel Matthews	Banks Peninsula	Vanessa Weenink
Daniel Zhao	Waikato	Tim van de Molen
Delara Elavia	Te Atatū	Phil Twyford
Dilsher Kaur	Tauranga	Sam Uffindell
EJ Coffin	Wigram	Megan Woods
Elenor Walsh	East Coast	Dana Kirkpatrick
Elite Reti	List	Peeni Henare
Emma Grace Yule	Christchurch East	Reuben Davidson
Emmogen Mckay	Nelson	Rachel Boyack
Enya O’Donnell	Waitaki	Miles Anderson
Esha Ram	List	Steve Abel
Faith Heke	List	Willow-Jean Prime
Fletcher Brown	List	Cameron Luxton
Gayle Bain	List	Deborah Russell
Grace Foster	List	Shanan Halbert
Gustav Schwind	Rongotai	Julie Anne Genter
Haemish Hollings	List	Tanya Unkovich
Hana Davis	Te Tai Tonga	Tākuta Ferris
Harriet McLauchlan	Kaikōura	Stuart Smith
Harrison Ross Moreland	List	Mark Cameron
Harveer Talwar	Upper Harbour	Cameron Brewer
Hineātea Alexander	Christchurch Central	Duncan Webb
Holly Timmins	Port Waikato	Andrew Bayly
Hunter McKay Fairfax Heath	List	Todd Stephenson
Irfan “Cherry” Safin	List	Lawrence Xu-Nan
Iris Ewart	List	Celia Wade-Brown
Isabella White	Coromandel	Scott Simpson
Jake Higgins	Ikaroa-Rāwhiti	Cushla Tangaere-Manuel
James Watson	List	Scott Willis
Jasper Rhodes	New Plymouth	David MacLeod
Jermaine Rei Del Mundo	List	Winston Peters
Jerry Wei	List	Karen Chhour
Jessica Tupai	Wellington Central	Tamatha Paul
Jomana Moharram	List	Francisco Hernandez
Jorja Simmonds	Auckland Central	Chlöe Swarbrick
Josh Henderson	List	Gerry Brownlee
Joshua Wang	East Coast Bays	Erica Stanford
Kaiata Kaitao	List	Teanau Tuiono
Keezia Broughton	Palmerston North	Tangi Utikere
Kenahemana Hekau	Kelston	Carmel Sepuloni
Kupa Poihipi	Waiariki	Rawiri Waititi
Leonardo Fisher	List	Shane Jones
Lily Foster	Northcote	Dan Bidois
Lincoln Jones	List	Willie Jackson
Louis McSporran	List	Jenny Marcroft
Lucas Zhang	List	Nancy Lu
Lucy Garner	Selwyn	Nicola Grigg
Lucy Kilgour	List	Paul Goldsmith
Lucy Trenberth	Hutt South	Chris Bishop
Mackay Thomson	List	Ayesha Verrall
Madeleine 'One'one	Maungakiekie	Greg Fleming
Madina Sayed	List	Casey Costello
Maevi Fleming	Rangitata	James Meager
Mahant Agrawal	Mount Roskill	Carlos Cheung
Mariah Wakefield-Otene	Napier	Katie Nimon
Maro Preston	Te Tai Hauāuru	Debbie Ngarewa-Packer
Marques Tominiko	Māngere	Lemauga Lydia Sosene
Matthew Debreceny	List	Benjamin Doyle
Mele Akoteu	Manurewa	Arena Williams
Mikaela Renner	Tāmaki	Brooke van Velden
Nargis Girhotra	Invercargill	Penny Simmonds
Nate Wilbourne	List	Damien O'Connor
Neeve Smith	Wairarapa	Mike Butterick
Nikau Adams	List	Jamie Arbuckle
Nydius Wilson	Hamilton West	Tama Potaka
Olivia Kelly	Kaipara ki Mahurangi	Chris Penk
Oscar Duffy	List	Melissa Lee
Patrick Coogan	Rangitīkei	Suze Redmayne
Payton Māata Matthews-Runga	List	Kahurangi Carter
Pererika James Bennett	Rotorua	Todd McClay
Phoebe Ashdown	Dunedin	Rachel Brooking
Renee Lloyd-Parangi	Tāmaki Makaurau	Takutai Tarsh Kemp
Ruby Love-Smith	List	Tracey McLellan
Ryan Grant-Derepa	Remutaka	Chris Hipkins
Ryan Higgins	Papakura	Judith Collins
Ryder Miller	Taupō	Louise Upston
Sabrina Liu	List	Parmjeet Parmar
Sam Allan	Ilam	Hamish Campbell
Sam Nicholls	West Coast-Tasman	Maureen Pugh
Sam Swallow	Pakuranga	Simeon Brown
Shriya Ganti	Epsom	David Seymour
Simone Bisschoff	Waimakariri	Matt Doocey
Sophie Blacklock	Ōhāriu	Greg O'Connor
Sophie Dodunski	List	Glen Bennett
Sylvie Macfarlane	List	Camilla Belich
Taiko Edwards-Haruru	Whanganui	Carl Bates
Tamorangi Clayton-Lake	Taranaki-King Country	Barbara Kuriger
Tanvi Upreti	Bay of Plenty	Tom Rutherford
Tautalaleleia Sa'u	List	Ginny Andersen
Te Ari Paranihi	List	Adrian Rurawhe
Te Atamihi Vivienne Papa	Hauraki-Waikato	Hana-Rawhiti Maipi-Clarke
Terangitukiwaho Edwards	Te Tai Tokerau	Mariameno Kapa-Kingi
Thomas Brocherie	List	Lan Pham
Thomas Richards	List	Laura McClure
Tom Xuyi Xu	List	Simon Court
Tyler Oroanu	Panmure-Ōtāhuhu	Jenny Salesa
Vashika Singh	Mount Albert	Helen White
Zenah Taha	Taieri	Ingrid Leary

=== Youth Press Gallery Members 2025 ===
A panel selected up to 20 young people to participate as Youth Press Gallery members. To apply to be a member of the Youth Press Gallery, young people needed to complete the application form. The link to the online application could be found on SmartyGrants. The application form asked young people to provide a current Curriculum Vitae (CV), two examples of their work, an opinion piece on one of two topics provided, and two references.

Youth Press Gallery Member	Location
AJ Muliaga	Auckland
Aleksandra Bogdanova	Christchurch
Aman Khalid	Auckland
Andrea McEntyre	Christchurch
Arshita Bhardwaj	Auckland
Cerys Gibby	Auckland
Emelie Wissel	Christchurch
Emma Westenra	Tasman
Hadassah Timo	Christchurch
Hope Milo	Auckland
Jason You	Wellington
Jonathan McCabe	Auckland
Josephine Lilley	Tauranga
Korus MacDonald	Havelock
Kyla Allen-Boyd	Kaitiaki
Liorah Jainarain	Whanganui
Reuben Smith	Christchurch
Sebastien Booth	Rakaia
Taara Malhi	Auckland
Yeonsoo Son	Auckland
