= Carol Beaumont =

New Zealand politician

Carol Beaumont ONZM
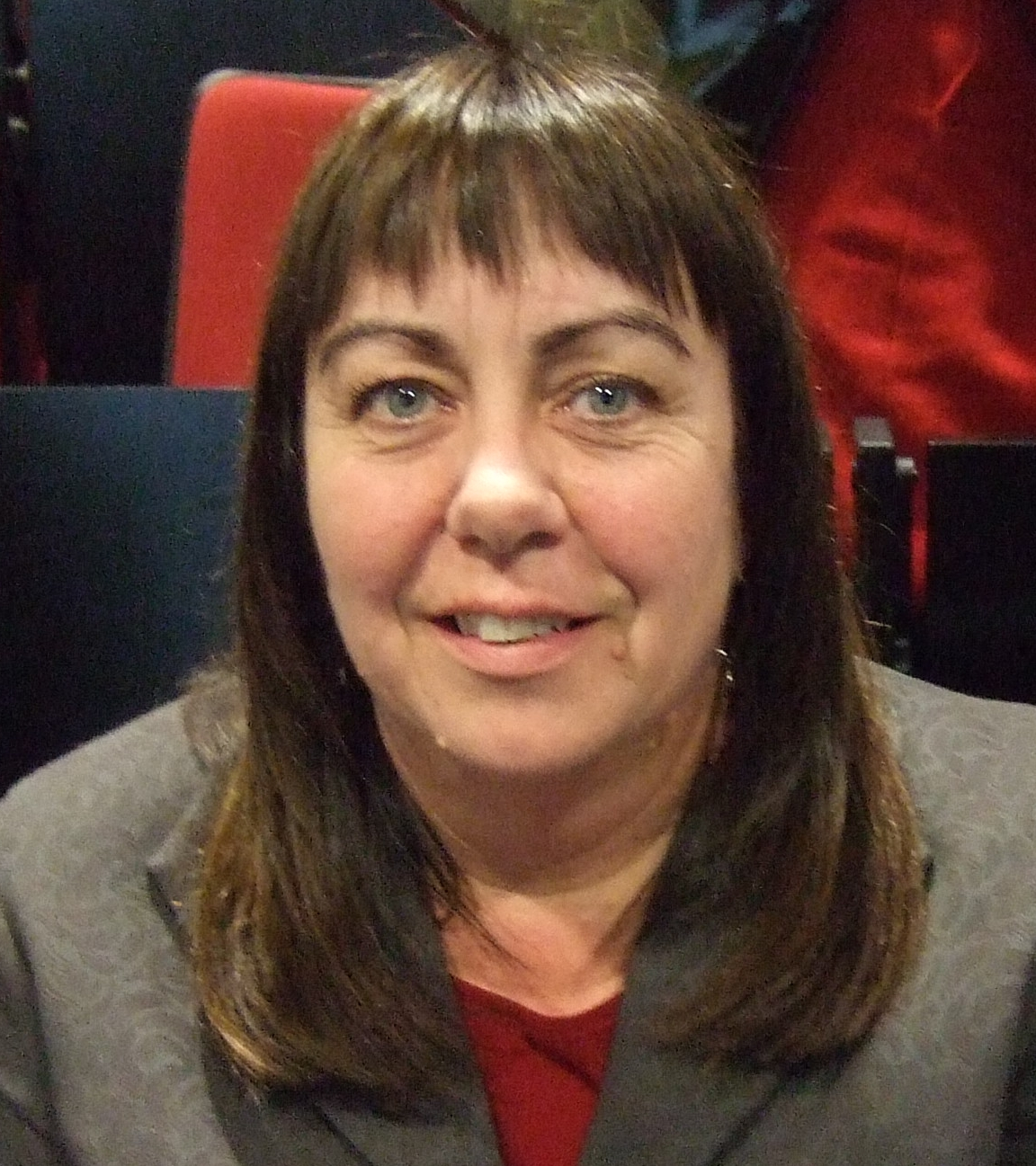
- Beaumont in August 2011

Vice-President of the New Zealand Labour Party
- Incumbent
- Assumed office 7 May 2021
- Preceded by: Tracey McLellan

Member of the New Zealand Parliament for Labour party list
- In office 12 March 2013 – 20 September 2014
- Preceded by: Charles Chauvel
- In office 8 November 2008 – 26 November 2011

Personal details
- Born: 6 October 1960 (age 66) Hamilton, New Zealand
- Party: Labour
- Domestic partner: Robert Gallagher
- Website: carolbeaumont.org.nz

Carol Ann Beaumont ONZM (born 6 October 1960) is a New Zealand unionist and Labour Party politician. She twice served as a list member of Parliament from 2008 to 2011 and 2013 to 2014, and was elected Labour Party senior vice president in 2021.

== Early life and career ==
Beaumont worked for several unions before entering Parliament, including the New Zealand University Students' Association, New Zealand Nurses Association and New Zealand Council of Trade Unions (NZCTU). She was NZCTU Secretary from 2003 until 2008.

== Political career ==
=== Member of Parliament ===
New Zealand Parliament
| Years | Term | Electorate | List | Party |
|---|---|---|---|---|
| 2008–2011 | 49th | List | 28 | Labour |
| 2013–2014 | 50th | List | 22 | Labour |

Beaumont stood for Labour at the 2008 general election in Maungakiekie, an electorate that was held at the time by the retiring Mark Gosche. She finished second to Auckland City councillor Sam Lotu-Iiga, the National Party candidate. Beaumont was elected to Parliament as a list MP. Labour was in opposition and Beaumont was appointed Labour spokesperson for consumer affairs and associate spokesperson for labour. In early 2010 she took over responsibility for Charles Chauvel's Credit Reforms (Responsible Lending) Bill, which had been drawn from the ballot in August 2009. The bill was defeated at its first reading in July 2010.

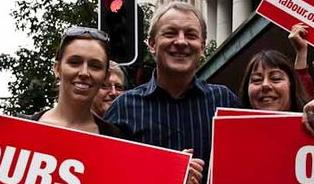
Beaumont (right), with Jacinda Ardern and Phil Goff

At the 2011 general election Beaumont again finished second to Lotu-Iiga in Maungakiekie. Despite a higher list rating than in 2008, Labour did not poll high enough for Beaumont to be returned as a list MP until the 2013 resignation of Charles Chauvel. In her second term, Beaumont was Labour spokesperson for women's affairs and consumer rights and standards.

At the 2014 election Beaumont contested Maungakiekie a third time. Boundary changes were assumed to make the seat safer for Labour, but Beaumont was defeated by Lotu-Iiga for a third time and was not re-elected on the party list. She did not contest the 2017 election.

=== Post-parliamentary career ===
In 2021 Beaumont was elected vice-president of the Labour Party following the resignation of Tracey McLellan, who had been elected to parliament the previous year.

== Awards and honours ==
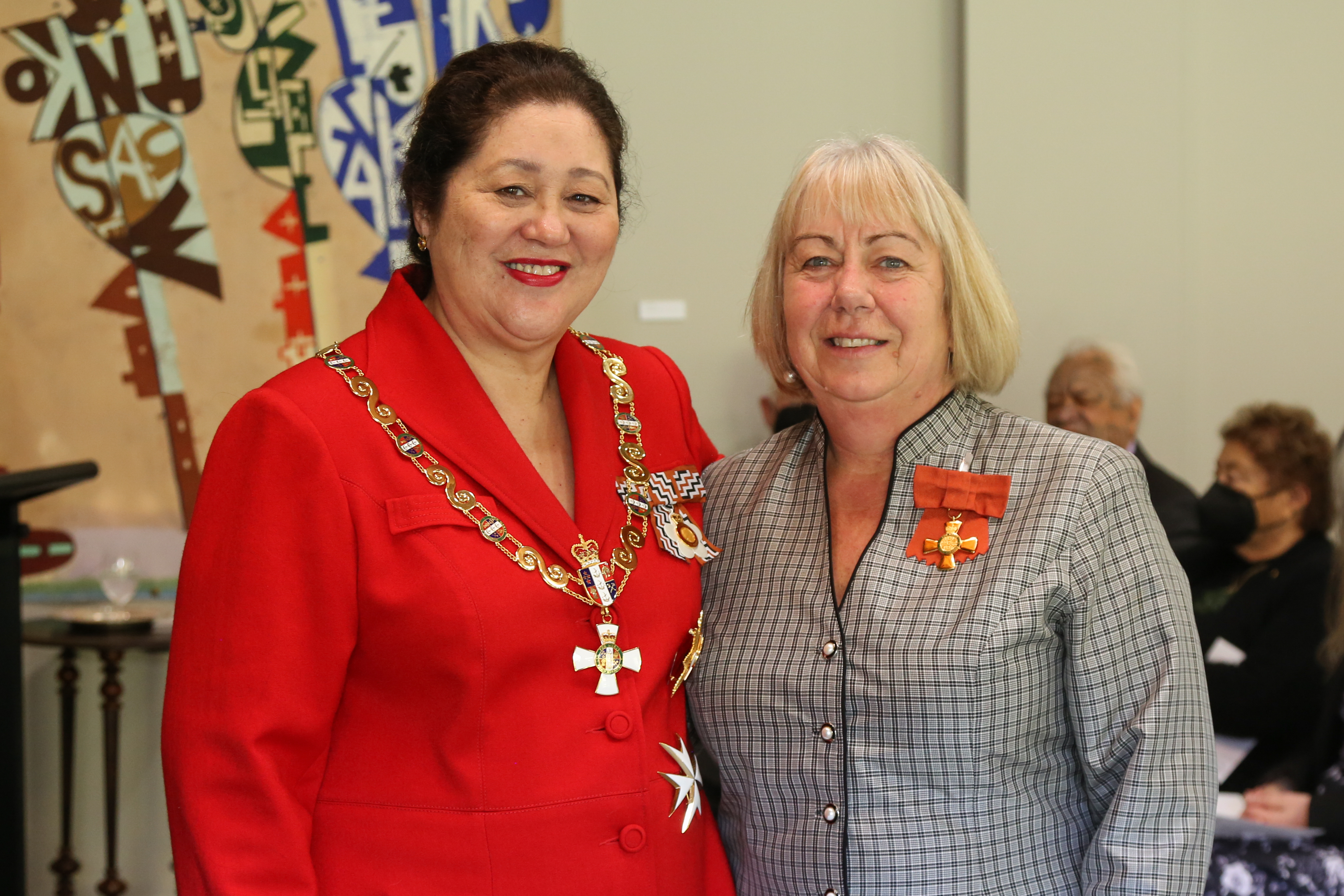
Beaumont (right), after her investiture as an Officer of the New Zealand Order of Merit by the governor-general, Dame Cindy Kiro, at Government House, Auckland, on 27 May 2022

In the 2021 Queen's Birthday Honours, Beaumont was appointed an Officer of the New Zealand Order of Merit, for services to the union movement and women's rights.

== Personal life ==
Beaumont's partner, Robert Gallagher, was one of the Labour Party campaign team strategists and in January 2015 announced his intention to stand for the Labour Party Presidency. He was unsuccessful.

Party political offices
| Preceded by Tracey McLellan | Vice-President of the New Zealand Labour Party; 2021–present | Incumbent |
