= Greg Fleming (politician) =

New Zealand charitable sector consultant and politician

Greg Fleming MP
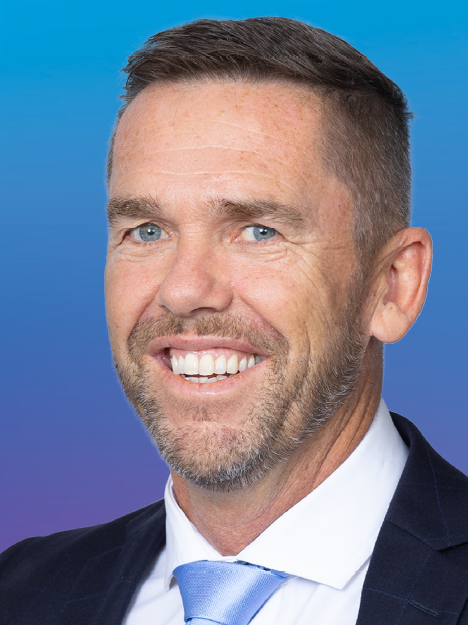
- Fleming in 2023

Member of the New Zealand Parliament for Maungakiekie
- Incumbent
- Assumed office 14 October 2023
- Preceded by: Priyanca Radhakrishnan

Personal details
- Born: Gregory Wray Fleming; 1970 or 1971 (age 55–56) Masterton, New Zealand
- Party: National
- Spouse: Kirstin
- Children: 5
- Education: Victoria University of Wellington

Gregory Wray Fleming (born 1970 or 1971) is a New Zealand politician and Member of Parliament in the House of Representatives for the National Party. First elected in the 2023 election in the Maungakiekie electorate, he beat the incumbent Priyanca Radhakrishnan. He is a co-founder of the conservative think tank Maxim Institute and is involved in a number of Christian-based charities.

== Early life and career ==
Fleming was born in Masterton and attended Wairarapa College. He received a Bachelor of Commerce from Victoria University of Wellington. Fleming co-founded the conservative think tank Maxim Institute alongside Bruce Logan in 2001 and served as CEO after Logan retired in 2005. During his time at the Maxim Institute he campaigned against the Prostitution Reform Act 2003 and the Civil Union Act 2004, comparing civil unions to polygamy and incest; he clarified that his views have since changed.

Fleming was general manager of Parenting with Confidence before founding the Maxim Institute. The organisation's name changed to Parents Inc., and then The Parenting Place. Fleming became involved again and was chief executive of The Parenting Place family charity between 2015 and 2020.

=== Te Whakaora Tangata ===
He was the founding Chair and trustee of Te Whakaora Tangata, a defunct Christian-based charity based in Manurewa aimed at addressing intergenerational poverty. They worked with people in poverty, rebuilding their lives through counselling and practical support.

=== Venn Foundation ===
Fleming is a co-founder of the Venn Foundation, a Christian educational institution.

== Political career ==
New Zealand Parliament
Years	Term	Electorate	List	Party
2023–2026	54th	Maungakiekie	65	National
2026–present	55th	Maungakiekie	43	National

Fleming was announced as National's Maungakiekie electorate candidate for the 2023 general election on 26 March 2023. After his previous comments on civil unions resurfaced in April 2023, Fleming clarified that his position had changed since then. Fleming defeated incumbent MP Priyanca Radhakrishnan by a margin of 4,617.

=== First term, 2023–2026 ===
In November 2023, shortly after his election to the Maungakiekie seat, Fleming responded to an email from a constituent about the situation in Gaza by saying he shared their "horror and grief". "While it is an absolute privilege to serve the community of Maungakiekie one of the many things I'm fast learning is the limits of my authority due to being part of a big machine," he wrote in an email shared on Twitter. "Whilst I can't speak publicly on matters of foreign policy I can certainly advocate internally for causes. Hence you can be sure that I'm urging those who speak for our government to call for an immediate ceasefire."

Fleming gave his maiden speech in Parliament on Tuesday 19 December 2023, opening his statement by reciting Psalm 1:1–3 in te reo Māori. He referenced a number of community organisations in his electorate, stating that his goals were "to champion that sector, those platoons of civil society, those thousand points of light that bring life and hope to people's lives: organisations like Tō Wāhi and the Oranga Community Centre, like the Mount Wellington community network and Connect the Dots, like Elevate Disabilities Trust and the Hearing House in One Tree Hill, like the Ellerslie, Mount Wellington, and Onehunga community patrols, like the Salvation Army in Royal Oak, like the Onehunga and Ellerslie business associations, and like every school and club and family in Maungakiekie."

In early June 2025, he and New Zealand First MP Jenny Marcroft received a delegation outside Parliament carrying the 90,000-strong Pawprint Petition calling for a ban on the public sale of fireworks.

In early December 2025, Fleming expressed sympathy with the Māori broadcasting agency Te Māngai Pāho's opposition to the National-led government's plans to cut the agency's funding by NZ$16 million (25% of its budget) in the 2026 New Zealand budget. He reiterated his support for Te Māngai Pāho and said he would lobby Prime Minister Christopher Luxon to maintain strong funding to the Māori broadcast funding agency. In late May 2026, the New Zealand Government allocated $48 million for the next four years to supporting Māori language broadcasting by helping Māori media organisations adapt to digitisation and produce Māori-language content.

In late January 2026, Fleming and Labour Party MP Camilla Belich co-sponsored a modern slavery bill that proposes fining large companies NZ$200,000 for failing to monitor and report modern slavery in their supply chain. Due to the ACT Party and Minister for Workplace Relations Brooke van Velden's objections, the duo had opted to co-sponsor the member's bill to circumvent the private member's bill ballot system. The bill passed its first reading on 29 April 2026 with the support of all parliamentary parties except ACT.

=== Second term, 2026–present ===
During the 2026 New Zealand general election, Fleming contested the Maungakiekie electorate for National. He was ranked 43rd on the National Party list. Based on preliminary results, Fleming retained Maungakiekie by a margin of 2,952 votes.

New Zealand Parliament
Preceded by Priyanca Radhakrishnan	Member of Parliament for Maungakiekie; 2023–present	Incumbent
