= Matt Robson =

Australian-born New Zealand politician

The Honourable Matt Robson

5th Minister of Corrections
- In office 10 December 1999 – 15 August 2002
- Prime Minister: Helen Clark
- Preceded by: Clem Simich
- Succeeded by: Mark Gosche

4th Minister for Courts
- In office 10 December 1999 – 15 August 2002
- Prime Minister: Helen Clark
- Preceded by: Georgina te Heuheu
- Succeeded by: Margaret Wilson

Member of the New Zealand Parliament for Progressive Party list
- In office 27 July 2002 – 17 September 2005

Member of the New Zealand Parliament for Alliance list
- In office 12 October 1996 – 27 July 2002

Personal details
- Born: Matthew Peter Robson; 5 January 1950 (age 76) Brisbane, Queensland, Australia
- Party: Progressive (2002–2012); Alliance (1991–2002); Labour (before 1989)
- Spouse: Petronella Townsend
- Occupation: Teacher
- Profession: Lawyer

Matthew Peter Robson (born 5 January 1950) is an Australian-born New Zealand politician. He was deputy leader of the Progressive Party, and served in the Parliament from 1996 to 2005, first as a member of the Alliance, then as a Progressive.

== Biography ==
=== Early life ===
Robson was born in Brisbane, Queensland, Australia. He attained an MA (Hons) in Political Studies and later studied law, and worked both as a lawyer and a teacher. He also spent three years in the Netherlands as a technical editor.

Robson was originally a member of the Labour Party, holding several positions within the party organisation. In 1981 he became chairman of Labour's Otara electorate committee and was campaign manager to Colin Moyle in the seat at the 1984 election before resigning as chairman and from the party itself in 1989, taking almost 300 members with him. He was deeply opposed to the neo-liberal economic policies of Roger Douglas, the Labour Party's Minister of Finance, and when Jim Anderton, a Labour MP, quit the party, Robson followed him. Robson was heavily involved in the establishment of Anderton's NewLabour Party (NLP), which later became the core of the Alliance. He was NLP spokesperson for industrial relations and immigration. He contested the Otara electorate for NewLabour in the 1990 election. At the 1992 local-body elections he put himself forward as a candidate for the Maungakiekie ward of the Auckland City Council. Standing as an Alliance candidate (the NLP was a component party of the Alliance) he was unsuccessful.

In December 1992, following the Wellington Central by-election, Robson was designated NLP spokesperson for defence to replace Keith Locke whom Anderton considered too left-wing. Later he was the Alliance candidate for Onehunga in the 1993 election. In 1994 when Anderton briefly resigned as Alliance leader, and co-deputy leader Sandra Lee was temporarily elevated to the leadership, Robson was elected her temporary replacement co-deputy leader beating Democrats leader John Wright for the position. He also became acting president of NewLabour during Anderton's absence between May and August 1995.

=== Member of Parliament ===
New Zealand Parliament
| Years | Term | Electorate | List | Party |
|---|---|---|---|---|
| 1996–1999 | 45th | List | 7 | Alliance |
| 1999–2002 | 46th | List | 3 | Alliance |
| 2002–2005 | 47th | List | 2 | Progressive |

Robson was elected to Parliament as an Alliance list MP in the 1996 election, and again in the 1999 election, having stood in Maungakiekie, and coming in third place at both elections. In the Labour-Alliance coalition government (1999–2002), Robson was Minister of Corrections, Minister for Courts, Minister for Land Information, and Associate Minister of Foreign Affairs (with responsibility for foreign aid). Towards the end of 1999, however, the Alliance began to collapse, with a rift opening between the party organisation and its parliamentary leadership. In this dispute, Robson sided with the parliamentary leader, Anderton. When Anderton finally left the Alliance and established the Progressive Coalition (later renamed as the Progressive Party), Robson followed him and became the new party's deputy leader. In the 2002 election, the Progressives only won 1.7% of the vote. However, Anderton easily held onto his seat, allowing Robson (standing in Manukau East, where he came fifth), as the 2nd-ranked person on the Progressive list, to return to Parliament. However, the Progressives' strength was considerably weaker compared to that of the Alliance in 1999, so Robson lost his cabinet posts.

Robson has a relatively high public profile, compared to the size of his party, and is known for his views on foreign affairs and justice. Along with the Green Party's Keith Locke, Robson campaigned on behalf of detained asylum-seeker Ahmed Zaoui. In 2002, Robson introduced a Private Member's bill providing for four weeks of paid annual leave for all workers, a proposal that the Labour Party initially opposed. Robson's legislation, however, ultimately forced Labour to either vote in favour of the bill or risk alienating its trade union supporters, who vociferously advocated it. The legislation was passed into law with Labour's support and took effect in 2007. Robson also introduced legislation to raise the minimum alcohol purchasing age to 20, and in Parliament espoused policies to combat drug and alcohol abuse.

In the 2005 election, the Progressive vote collapsed further, and this time was not enough for Robson to remain in Parliament. He returned to practising law. In the 2008 election he was again a candidate in Maungakiekie, but did poorly, finishing fifth, with 2.22% of the vote. The Progressives received just under one percent of the party vote, not enough for Robson to be returned to Parliament. At the 2009 Mount Albert by-election Robson campaigned for Labour candidate David Shearer.

On 14 July 2022, Robson had the rare distinction of appearing twice, in positions 47 and 72, in the list of politicians, academics, activists promoting Russian propaganda published by the Ukraine Government.

== Personal life ==
Despite having achieved high political office in New Zealand, Robson did not become a naturalised citizen until 2000. Under the terms of New Zealand's Electoral Act 1993, any permanent resident before August 1975 has the right to vote and stand for election.

Robson is married to Petronella Townsend who was an influential organisational figure in the Alliance and Progressive parties. At the 2005 election she was a Progressive list candidate and stood in the seat of Auckland Central.

== Notes ==
Political offices
| Preceded by Clem Simich | Minister of Corrections; 1999–2002 | Succeeded by Mark Gosche |
| Preceded by Georgina te Heuheu | Minister for Courts; 1999–2002 | Succeeded by Margaret Wilson |
| Preceded by Paul Swain | Minister for Land Information; 2000–2002 | Succeeded by John Tamihere |
Party political offices
| New political party | Deputy Leader of the Progressive Party; 2002–2012 | Party dissolved |
| Preceded by Sandra Lee | Deputy Leader of the Alliance; 1994–1995; Served alongside: Jeanette Fitzsimons | Succeeded by Sandra Lee |
