= Maungakiekie (electorate) =

- Single-member general constituency for the New Zealand House of Representatives
- Interactive map of boundaries from the 2026 election
- Formation: 1996
- Region: Auckland
- Character: Urban and suburban
- Term: 3 years

Member for Maungakiekie
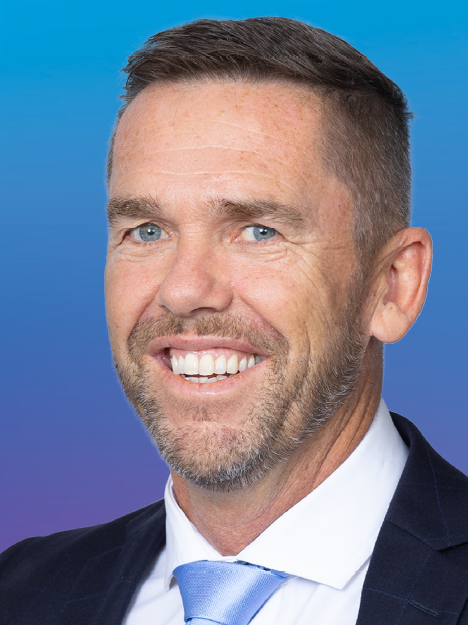
- Greg Fleming since 14 October 2023
- Party: National
- List MPs: Priyanca Radhakrishnan (Labour)
- Previous MP: Priyanca Radhakrishnan
Party vote distribution

Maungakiekie is a New Zealand parliamentary electorate, returning one Member of Parliament to the New Zealand House of Representatives. The current MP for Maungakiekie is Greg Fleming of the National Party. The electorate's name comes from Maungakiekie / One Tree Hill, a large and symbolically important hill at the western end of the seat.

== Population centres ==
Map of boundaries at the 2020 and 2023 general elections

The core of Maungakiekie is the suburbs of Auckland clustered around the Southern Motorway, and the most southern parts of the Auckland isthmus facing the Manukau Harbour. These include the suburbs of One Tree Hill, Greenlane, Ellerslie, Mount Wellington, Penrose, Southdown, Te Papapa, Onehunga and Royal Oak. In 2020, the seat lost Panmure to Panmure-Ōtāhuhu and gained Royal Oak from Mount Roskill. In the 2025 boundary review, the electorate would gain Tāmaki, Panmure and Westfield from Panmure-Ōtāhuhu. The initial proposal would have seen the suburb of Greenlane transferred to Epsom, however this did not occur after public consultation.

In character, the seat is a minority-majority seat, with a large Māori, Pasifika and Asian population. It is also quite a young seat, with 46.8 percent of the seat's residents under the age of thirty.

== History ==
Maungakiekie has existed in various forms since its creation ahead of the introduction of Mixed Member Proportional voting in the 1996 election. It was created from merging most of Onehunga with a large section of Panmure, both of them reasonably safe Labour seats. Its original incarnation included both Onehunga and Otahuhu, though for the nine years from 1996, Onehunga was part of Mount Roskill, and from 2008 onwards, Otahuhu formed the northernmost part of Manukau East. The same boundary changes that took Otahuhu out put Panmure in at the expense of Tāmaki.

Because of these seats' tendency to vote Labour, it was initially thought to be a safe Labour seat. The last MP for Onehunga, Richard Northey, sought election in the new seat. However, Labour suffered its worst result since World War II in 1996, with votes splintering off to both the Alliance and New Zealand First. As a result, Northey found himself ousted from Parliament in 1996 at the hands of then unknown National Party candidate Belinda Vernon. Vernon's own party suffered a dramatic reversal of fortune that started at the 1999 election and her three-year term as MP for Maungakiekie ended in favour of Mark Gosche, who held the seat until 2008, notching up a majority of around 6,500 in the intermediate elections.

Sam Lotu-liga captured the seat again for National in the large swing against Labour in 2008. On 13 December 2016, Lotu-liga announced that he was quitting politics, to take effect at the 2017 general election. The electorate was won by Denise Lee at the election, retaining the seat for the National Party.

=== Members of Parliament ===
Unless otherwise stated, all MPs' terms began and ended at general elections.

Key

National Labour

Election	Winner
1996 election	Belinda Vernon
1999 election	Mark Gosche
2002 election	Mark Gosche
2005 election	Mark Gosche
2008 election	Sam Lotu-Iiga
2011 election	Sam Lotu-Iiga
2014 election	Sam Lotu-Iiga
2017 election	Denise Lee
2020 election	Priyanca Radhakrishnan
2023 election	Greg Fleming

=== List MPs ===
Members of Parliament elected from party lists in elections where that person also unsuccessfully contested the Maungakiekie electorate. Unless otherwise stated, all MPs terms began and ended at general elections.

Alliance NZ First National Labour Green

Election	Winner
1996 election	Matt Robson
1999	Gilbert Myles (Note: Myles entered Parliament on 16 February 1999 following Deborah Morris's resignation.)
1999 election	Matt Robson
1999 election	Belinda Vernon
2008 election	Carol Beaumont
2013	Carol Beaumont (Note: Beaumont entered Parliament on 13 March 2013 following Charles Chauvel's resignation.)
2017 election	Chlöe Swarbrick
2017 election	Priyanca Radhakrishnan
2020 election	Ricardo Menéndez March
2023 election	Priyanca Radhakrishnan

== Election results ==
=== 2026 election ===
The next election will be held on 7 November 2026. Candidates for Maungakiekie are listed at Candidates in the 2026 New Zealand general election by electorate § Maungakiekie. Official results will be available after 27 November 2026.

=== 2023 election ===
2023 general election: Maungakiekie
Notes:	Blue background denotes the winner of the electorate vote. Pink background denotes a candidate elected from their party list. Yellow background denotes an electorate win by a list member, or other incumbent. A ✓ or ✗ denotes status of any incumbent, win or lose respectively.						
Party	Candidate	Votes	%	±%	Party votes	%	±%
National	Greg Fleming	16,952	47.70		14,935	41.43	+15.68
Labour	✗ Priyanca Radhakrishnan	12,335	34.71	−8.85	9,801	27.19	−23.14
Green	Sapna Samant	3,138	8.83		4,964	13.77	+4.71
ACT	Margo Onishchenko	1,291	3.63		2,863	7.94	+0.86
NZ First	Andrew Hogg	920	2.58		1,379	3.82	+1.75
Independent	Philip Bridge	249	0.70				
Rock The Vote NZ	Eric Chuah	136	0.38				
Opportunities					952	2.64	+0.79
Te Pāti Māori					336	0.93	
NZ Loyal					157	0.43	+0.51
NewZeal					142	0.39	+0.22
Legalise Cannabis					111	0.30	+0.04
Freedoms NZ					89	0.24	
Animal Justice					51	0.14	
New Conservative					45	0.12	−0.98
Women's Rights					30	0.08	
DemocracyNZ					25	0.06	
New Nation					7	0.01	
Leighton Baker Party					5	0.01	
Informal votes		514			149		
Total valid votes		35,535			36,041		
National gain from Labour	Majority	4,617	12.99				

=== 2020 election ===
2020 general election: Maungakiekie
Notes:	Blue background denotes the winner of the electorate vote. Pink background denotes a candidate elected from their party list. Yellow background denotes an electorate win by a list member, or other incumbent. A ✓ or ✗ denotes status of any incumbent, win or lose respectively.						
Party	Candidate	Votes	%	±%	Party votes	%	±%
Labour	Priyanca Radhakrishnan	16,232	43.56	+6.52	18,895	50.33	+7.04
National	✗ Denise Lee	15,597	41.86	−1.39	9,668	25.75	−14.91
Green	Ricardo Menendez March	2,666	7.15	−4.51	3,403	9.06	+3.21
ACT	Tommy Fergusson	1,225	3.28	—	2,660	7.08	+6.45
New Conservative	Philip Holder	513	1.37	—	416	1.10	+0.91
NZ First					780	2.07	−3.00
Opportunities					697	1.85	−0.33
Advance NZ					206	0.54	—
Māori Party					159	0.42	−0.39
Legalise Cannabis					99	0.26	+0.03
TEA					82	0.21	—
ONE					66	0.17	—
Vision NZ					47	0.12	—
Sustainable NZ					24	0.06	—
Outdoors					18	0.04	−0.06
Social Credit					7	0.02	+0.01
Heartland					2	0.01	—
Informal votes		1,024			306		
Total valid votes		37,257			37,535		
Turnout		37,535					
Labour gain from National	Majority	635	1.70	−4.51			

=== 2017 election ===
2017 general election: Maungakiekie
Notes:	Blue background denotes the winner of the electorate vote. Pink background denotes a candidate elected from their party list. Yellow background denotes an electorate win by a list member, or other incumbent. A ✓ or ✗ denotes status of any incumbent, win or lose respectively.						
Party	Candidate	Votes	%	±%	Party votes	%	±%
National	Denise Lee	15,063	43.25	−4.36	14,542	40.66	−0.67
Labour	Priyanca Radhakrishnan	12,906	37.04	−3.64	15,484	43.29	+8.27
Green	Chlöe Swarbrick	4,060	11.66	+5.51	2,092	5.85	−3.54
NZ First	Ken Mahon	1,299	3.73	—	1,815	5.07	−1.48
Māori Party	Manase Lua	731	0.21	—	288	0.81	−0.27
Outdoors	Derrick Paull	108	0.31	—	36	0.10	—
Communist League	Michael Tucker	61	0.18	—			
Opportunities					780	2.18	—
ACT					227	0.63	−0.84
Legalise Cannabis					82	0.23	−0.09
Conservative					67	0.19	−2.95
People's Party					33	0.09	—
United Future					23	0.06	−0.17
Internet					16	0.04	—
Mana Party					10	0.03	—
Ban 1080					7	0.01	−0.02
Democrats					3	0.01	−0.01
Informal votes		596			260		
Total valid votes		34,824			35,765		
Turnout		35,765					
National hold	Majority	2,157	6.21	−0.72			

=== 2014 election ===
2014 general election: Maungakiekie
Notes:	Blue background denotes the winner of the electorate vote. Pink background denotes a candidate elected from their party list. Yellow background denotes an electorate win by a list member, or other incumbent. A ✓ or ✗ denotes status of any incumbent, win or lose respectively.						
Party	Candidate	Votes	%	±%	Party votes	%	±%
National	✓ Sam Lotu-Iiga	16,132	47.61	−2.27	14,394	41.33	−2.26
Labour	Carol Beaumont	13,784	40.68	+0.11	12,199	35.02	−1.83
Green	Richard Leckinger	2,085	6.15	+0.52	3,270	9.39	−0.13
Conservative	Litia Simpson	672	1.98	+0.62	1,095	3.14	+1.41
Mana	Sitaleki Finau	462	1.36	+0.91			
United Future	Bryan Mockridge	114	0.34	+0.34	80	0.23	−0.15
Communist League	Felicity Coggan	92	0.27	+0.27			
NZ First					2,283	6.55	+1.37
ACT					512	1.47	+0.29
Internet Mana					377	1.08	+0.67 (Note: 2014 Internet Mana swing is relative to the votes for Mana in 2011; it shared a party list with Internet in the 2014 election.)
Māori Party					187	0.54	−0.09
Legalise Cannabis					113	0.32	−0.06
Civilian					14	0.04	+0.04
Ban 1080					11	0.03	+0.03
Independent Coalition					10	0.03	+0.03
Democrats					8	0.02	±0.00
Focus					8	0.02	+0.02
Informal votes		540			270		
Total valid votes		33,881			34,831		
Turnout		34,831	75.23	+2.56			
National hold	Majority	2,348	6.93	−2.38			

=== 2011 election ===
2011 general election: Maungakiekie
Notes:	Blue background denotes the winner of the electorate vote. Pink background denotes a candidate elected from their party list. Yellow background denotes an electorate win by a list member, or other incumbent. A ✓ or ✗ denotes status of any incumbent, win or lose respectively.						
Party	Candidate	Votes	%	±%	Party votes	%	±%
National	✓ Sam Lotu-Iiga	16,189	49.88	+4.33	14,747	43.59	+1.11
Labour	Carol Beaumont	13,168	40.57	+0.73	12,467	36.85	−2.69
Green	Tom Land	1,827	5.63	+0.81	3,220	9.52	+4.04
NZ First	Jerry Ho	687	2.12	+0.26	1,753	5.18	+2.23
Conservative	Grace Haden	443	1.36	+1.36	585	1.73	+1.73
Mana	Barry Tumai	145	0.45	+0.45	140	0.41	+0.41
ACT					400	1.18	−3.35
Māori Party					213	0.63	−0.05
United Future					130	0.38	−0.75
Legalise Cannabis					128	0.38	+0.08
Libertarianz					28	0.08	-0.003
Alliance					13	0.04	−0.01
Democrats					7	0.02	+0.01
Informal votes		890			283		
Total valid votes		32,349			33,891		
National hold	Majority	3,021	9.31	+3.60			

Electorate (as at 26 November 2011): 46,637

=== 2008 election ===
2008 general election: Maungakiekie
Notes:	Blue background denotes the winner of the electorate vote. Pink background denotes a candidate elected from their party list. Yellow background denotes an electorate win by a list member, or other incumbent. A ✓ or ✗ denotes status of any incumbent, win or lose respectively.						
Party	Candidate	Votes	%	±%	Party votes	%	±%
National	Sam Lotu-Iiga	15,491	45.55	+13.95	14,903	42.48	+9.00
Labour	Carol Beaumont	13,549	39.84	−13.50	13,873	39.55	−11.16
Green	Rawiri Paratene	1,639	4.82	+1.78	1,921	5.48	
ACT	Athol McQuilkan	969	2.85	+0.75	1,589	4.53	+2.62
Progressive	Matt Robson	756	2.22	−0.32	334	0.95	−0.41
NZ First	Asenati Lole-Taylor	630	1.85	−1.37	1,035	2.95	−1.24
United Future	Denise Krum	413	1.21	−0.88	397	1.13	−0.91
Pacific	Darren Jones	246	0.72		229	0.65	
Kiwi	Bernie Ogilvy	173	0.51		113	0.32	
RAM	Elliott Blade	85	0.25		21	0.06	
Communist League	Patrick Brown	58	0.17				
Māori Party					239	0.68	+0.08
Family Party					132	0.38	
Bill and Ben					126	0.36	
Legalise Cannabis					104	0.30	+0.12
Libertarianz					30	0.09	+0.07
Alliance					17	0.05	+0.01
Workers Party					11	0.03	
Democrats					4	0.01	−0.01
RONZ					3	0.01	±0.00
Informal votes		474			191		
Total valid votes		34,009			35,081		
National gain from Labour	Majority	1,942	5.71	+27.46			

=== 2005 election ===
2005 general election: Maungakiekie
Notes:	Blue background denotes the winner of the electorate vote. Pink background denotes a candidate elected from their party list. Yellow background denotes an electorate win by a list member, or other incumbent. A ✓ or ✗ denotes status of any incumbent, win or lose respectively.						
Party	Candidate	Votes	%	±%	Party votes	%	±%
Labour	✓ Mark Gosche	15,821	53.34	−1.80	15,484	50.71	+0.09
National	Paul Goldsmith	9,371	31.60	+1.97	10,223	33.48	+16.42
NZ First	Joe Williams	956	3.22		1,278	4.19	−3.48
Green	Paul Quatrough	901	3.04	−1.26	583	1.77	−3.73
ACT	Michelle Lorenz	624	2.10	−1.57	584	1.91	−6.55
United Future	Bernie Ogilvy	619	2.09	−1.26	623	2.04	−3.81
Progressive	Sione Fonua	564	1.90	+0.46	414	1.36	−0.61
Māori Party	Bill Puru	263	0.89		184	0.60	
Communist League	Patrick Brown	54	0.18				
Republican	Bevin Berg	14	0.05				
Destiny					159	0.47	
Family Rights					144	0.44	
Legalise Cannabis					55	0.18	−0.17
Christian Heritage					46	0.15	−0.85
Alliance					11	0.04	−0.82
Direct Democracy					11	0.04	
99 MP					9	0.03	
Democrats					7	0.02	
Libertarianz					7	0.02	
One NZ					2	0.01	−0.03
RONZ					2	0.01	
Informal votes		409			149		
Total valid votes		29,659			30,532		
Labour hold	Majority	6,450	21.75	−3.76			

=== 2002 election ===
2002 general election: Maungakiekie
Notes:	Blue background denotes the winner of the electorate vote. Pink background denotes a candidate elected from their party list. Yellow background denotes an electorate win by a list member, or other incumbent. A ✓ or ✗ denotes status of any incumbent, win or lose respectively.						
Party	Candidate	Votes	%	±%	Party votes	%	±%
Labour	✓ Mark Gosche	14,273	55.14	+10.65	13,491	50.62	+4.18
National	Belinda Vernon	7,670	29.63	−5.90	4,547	17.06	−10.59
Green	Don Fairley	1,114	4.30	+0.86	1,466	5.50	+1.35
ACT	Robin Roodt	949	3.67	+0.91	2,256	8.46	+0.73
United Future	Kevin Harper	867	3.35		1,558	5.85	
Progressive	Dawn Patchett	373	1.44		524	1.97	
Christian Heritage	Barry Pepperell	346	1.34	+0.21	266	1.00	
Alliance	Joseph Randall	222	0.86	−6.62	250	0.94	−5.70
Communist League	Janet Roth	72	0.28				
NZ First					2,044	7.67	+4.83
ORNZ					129	0.48	
Legalise Cannabis					93	0.35	
Mana Māori					14	0.05	
One NZ					10	0.04	
NMP					3	0.01	
Informal votes		510			208		
Total valid votes		25,886			26,651		
Labour hold	Majority	6,603	25.51	+16.55			

=== 1999 election ===
1999 general election: Maungakiekie
Notes:	Blue background denotes the winner of the electorate vote. Pink background denotes a candidate elected from their party list. Yellow background denotes an electorate win by a list member, or other incumbent. A ✓ or ✗ denotes status of any incumbent, win or lose respectively.						
Party	Candidate	Votes	%	±%	Party votes	%	±%
Labour	Mark Gosche	12,469	44.49		13,234	46.44	
National	✗ Belinda Vernon	9,957	35.53		7,878	27.65	
Alliance	Matt Robson	2,096	7.48		1,891	6.64	
Green	Jon Carapiet	964	3.44		1183	4.15	
ACT	Angus Ogilvie	774	2.76		2,202	7.73	
NZ First	Gilbert Myles	734	2.62		810	2.84	
Christian Democrats	Jason Keiller	387	1.38		266		
Christian Heritage	Mary Paki	313	1.12		377		
Independent	Sue Henry	152	0.54				
Natural Law	Graeme Lodge	73	0.26		69		
Independent	Tony Cranston	67	0.24				
Republican	Brian Freeth	40	0.14		21		
Legalise Cannabis					178		
United NZ					169	0.59	
Libertarianz					63		
Mauri Pacific					43		
Animals First					39		
McGillicuddy Serious					30		
NMP					13		
One NZ					12		
Mana Māori					10		
People's Choice Party					3		
Freedom Movement					2		
South Island					1		
Total valid votes		28,026			28,494		
Labour gain from National	Majority	2,512	8.96				

=== 1996 election ===
1996 general election: Maungakiekie
Notes:	Blue background denotes the winner of the electorate vote. Pink background denotes a candidate elected from their party list. Yellow background denotes an electorate win by a list member, or other incumbent. A ✓ or ✗ denotes status of any incumbent, win or lose respectively.						
Party	Candidate	Votes	%	±%	Party votes	%	±%
National	Belinda Vernon	11,621	36.24		10,351	32.03	
Labour	✗ Richard Northey	11,393	35.52		11,024	34.12	
NZ First	Gilbert Myles	4,031	12.57		3,405	10.54	
Alliance	Matt Robson	3,188	9.94		2,706	8.37	
ACT	Angus Ogilvie	965	3.01		2,317	7.17	
Progressive Green	Dorothy Bond	254	0.79		115	0.36	
McGillicuddy Serious	John Orchard	207	0.65		72	0.22	
United NZ	Ramparkash Samujh	200	0.62		222	0.69	
Natural Law	Graeme Lodge	114	0.36		78	0.24	
Advance New Zealand	England So'onalole	66	0.21		22	0.07	
Republican	Bill Puru	32	0.10				
Christian Coalition					1,207	3.74	
Legalise Cannabis					400	1.24	
Ethnic Minority Party					255	0.79	
Animals First					46	0.14	
Superannuitants & Youth					25	0.08	
Libertarianz					17	0.05	
Green Society					15	0.05	
Mana Māori					14	0.04	
Conservatives					14	0.04	
Asia Pacific United					7	0.02	
Te Tawharau					0	0.00	
Informal votes		400			159		
Total valid votes		32,071			32,312		
National win new seat	Majority	228	0.71				
