= Priyanca Radhakrishnan =

New Zealand politician

The Honourable Priyanca Radhakrishnan MP
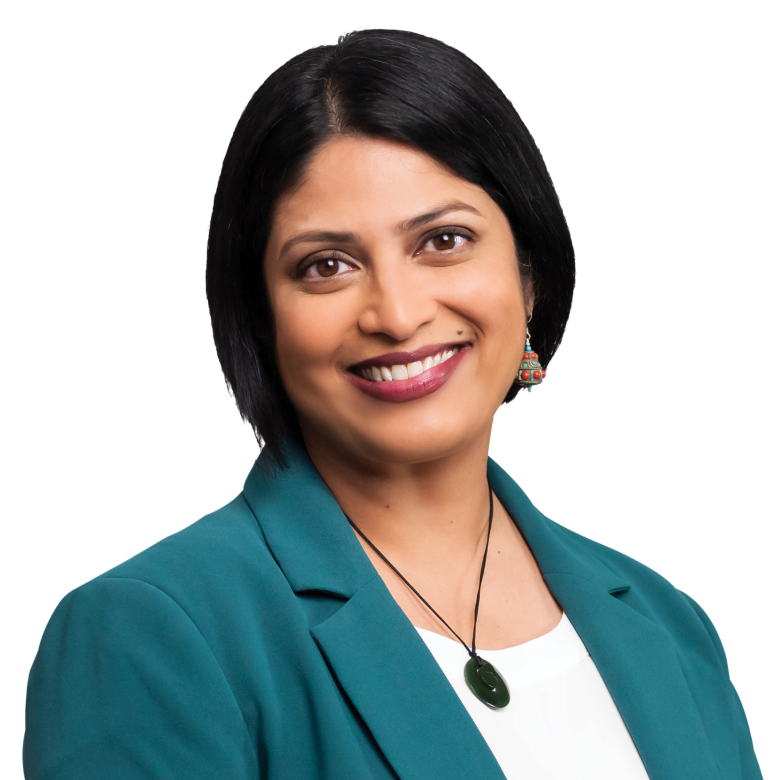
- Radhakrishnan in 2023

Minister for Disability Issues
- In office 1 February 2023 – 27 November 2023
- Prime Minister: Chris Hipkins
- Preceded by: Poto Williams
- Succeeded by: Penny Simmonds

10th Minister for the Community and Voluntary Sector
- In office 6 November 2020 – 27 November 2023
- Prime Minister: Jacinda Ardern; Chris Hipkins
- Preceded by: Poto Williams
- Succeeded by: Louise Upston

Minister for Diversity, Inclusion and Ethnic Communities
- In office 6 November 2020 – 27 November 2023
- Prime Minister: Jacinda Ardern; Chris Hipkins
- Preceded by: Jenny Salesa
- Succeeded by: Melissa Lee

15th Minister for Youth
- In office 6 November 2020 – 1 February 2023
- Prime Minister: Jacinda Ardern; Chris Hipkins
- Preceded by: Peeni Henare
- Succeeded by: Willow-Jean Prime

Member of the New Zealand Parliament
- Incumbent
- Assumed office 23 September 2017
- Constituency: List (2023–present); Maungakiekie (2020–23); List (2017–20)

Personal details
- Born: 1979 (age 46–47) Chennai, Tamil Nadu, India
- Party: Labour (2006–present)
- Education: Victoria University of Wellington
- Website: Labour Party profile

Priyanca Radhakrishnan MP (born 1979) is a New Zealand politician who has been elected to the New Zealand parliament since the 2017 general election as a representative of the New Zealand Labour Party and was Minister for the Community and Voluntary Sector from 2020 to 2023.

== Early life and career ==
Radhakrishnan was born in Chennai, India, to Malayali Nair parents. Her great-grandfather, Dr C. R. Krishna Pillai, was associated with left-wing politics in India, and played an instrumental role in the formation of the state of Kerala. She grew up in Singapore before moving to New Zealand. In Singapore she got her first job at around 16 years of age as an educational entertainer, performing educational skits for kindergarten children. She attended Victoria University of Wellington and graduated with a master's degree in development studies.

After graduating, Radhakrishnan worked as a social worker among the Indian community in Auckland. She joined the New Zealand Labour Party in 2006 and has worked on the internal party policy development process and has been active in both local and regional party organisation.

== Political career ==
New Zealand Parliament
Years	Term	Electorate	List	Party
2017–2020	52nd	List	12	Labour
2020–2023	53rd	Maungakiekie	31	Labour
2023–present	54th	List	15	Labour

At the 2014 election, Radhakrishnan was ranked number 23 on the Labour Party list, the highest newcomer, but narrowly missed out on election due to a drop in Labour's party vote that year.

=== First term, 2017–2020 ===
In October 2016, Radhakrishnan was selected as Labour's candidate for the electorate of Maungakiekie for the 2017 election. She was also ranked number 12 on Labour's list, making her the highest-ranked Labour member not already an MP and a significant increase from her ranking three years earlier.

Radhakrishnan did not win the electorate, but entered parliament via the Party list.

Radhakrishnan was mugged in broad daylight in an Auckland street after returning from a visit to Bangladesh.

Following a cabinet reshuffle on 27 June 2019, Radhakrishnan was appointed as the Parliamentary Private Secretary for Ethnic Affairs.

=== Second term, 2020–2023 ===
During the 2020 New Zealand general election held on 17 October, Radhakrishnan on preliminary results came second to National MP Denise Lee by a margin of 580 votes in the Maungakiekie electorate, but was returned to Parliament on the Labour Party list. The final election results saw Radhakrishnan defeat Lee by 635 votes and become MP for Maungakiekie.

On 2 November 2020, Radhakrishnan was appointed as Minister for the Community and Voluntary Sector, Minister for Diversity, Inclusion and Ethnic Communities, Minister for Youth and Associate Minister for Social Development and Employment, making her New Zealand's first Minister of Indian origin.

In a June 2022 reshuffle, Radhakrishnan was promoted to the cabinet as well as appointed as associate Minister for Workplace Relations and Safety by Prime Minister Jacinda Ardern.

=== Third term, 2023–2026 ===
During the 2023 New Zealand general election on 14 October, Radhakrishnan was unseated in Maungakiekie by National candidate Greg Fleming by a margin of 4,617. However, she was re-elected to Parliament on the Labour Party list.

In late November 2023, Radhakrishnan was appointed as spokesperson for conservation, disability issues, the New Zealand Security Intelligence Service (NZSIS), and the Government Communications Security Bureau (GCSB) in the Shadow Cabinet of Chris Hipkins.

Following a cabinet reshuffle in mid-March 2026, Radhakrishnan retained the conservation and disability portfolios but lost the NZSIS and GCSB portfolios. She gained the Accident Compensation Corporation (ACC) portfolio.

In late April 2026, Radhakrishnan's bill was drawn from Parliament's private member's bill balloting system. Her bill has proposed criminalising virginity testing and hymenoplasty in line with the World Health Organization and UN Women's efforts to ban these practices globally. She described virginity testing and hymenoplasty as "invasive, harmful practices" which violated women's human rights.

=== Fourth term, 2026–present ===
During the 2026 election, Radhakrishnan contested the Maungakiekie electorate for Labour. She was ranked 18th on the Labour Party list. On 7 November, Radhakrishnan came second place with 11,674 votes, based on preliminary results. She was re-elected to Parliament on the Labour Party list.

== Honours and awards ==
In January 2021, Radhakrishnan was conferred a Pravasi Bharatiya Samman award for public service, by the Indian president in a virtual ceremony. On 5 December 2023, Radhakrishnan was granted retention of the title The Honourable, in recognition of her term as a member of the Executive Council.

New Zealand Parliament
Preceded by Denise Lee	Member of Parliament for Maungakiekie; 2020–present	Succeeded by Greg Fleming
Political offices
Preceded by Peeni Henare	Minister for Youth; 2020–2023	Succeeded by Willow-Jean Prime
Preceded by Jenny Salesa	Minister for Diversity, Inclusion and Ethnic Communities; 2020–present	Succeeded by Melissa Lee
Preceded by Poto Williams	Minister for the Community and Voluntary Sector; 2020–present	Succeeded by Louise Upston
Preceded by Poto Williams	Minister for Disability Issues; 2023–present	Succeeded by Penny Simmonds
