= Denise Lee =

New Zealand politician

Denise Lee MP
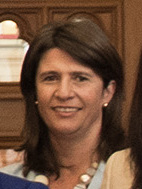
- Lee in 2018

Member of the New Zealand Parliament for Maungakiekie
- In office 23 September 2017 – 6 November 2020
- Preceded by: Sam Lotu-Iiga
- Succeeded by: Priyanca Radhakrishnan

Maungakiekie-Tāmaki Ward Councillor
- In office 13 October 2013 – 12 October 2017
- Preceded by: Richard Northey
- Succeeded by: Josephine Bartley

Personal details
- Born: 4 December 1970 (age 55) Paeroa, New Zealand
- Party: New Zealand National Party; Auckland Future (Local)
- Other political affiliations: United Future (until 2009)

Denise Adrienne Lee (previously Denise Krum; born 4 December 1970) is a New Zealand politician who was the National Party's Member of Parliament for the Maungakiekie electorate from 2017 to 2020. She was previously an Auckland Council local body councillor.

== Early years ==
Lee was born in Paeroa in 1970 and is the daughter of Graeme Lee, who was also a Member of Parliament.

She was married and known as Denise Krum during the start of her political career, before returning to her maiden name following the 2016 local election.

During the 2008 general election, Lee stood in Maungakiekie for United Future. Lee was President of United Future at the time. She later left United Future and joined the New Zealand National Party. She stood on the party list during the 2011 election but was not ranked high enough to be elected.

== Auckland Council ==
Auckland Council
Years	Ward	Affiliation
2013–16	Maungakiekie-Tāmaki	Communities and Residents
2016–17	Maungakiekie-Tāmaki	Auckland Future

Lee was elected to the Auckland Council as a Communities & Residents candidate at the 2013 elections, defeating incumbent and former Labour MP Richard Northey. She ran on the Auckland Future ticket during the 2016 local elections, and was re-elected with an increased majority.

In 2016, the then newly elected Mayor Phil Goff, appointed her as the deputy chairperson of the planning committee.

== Member of Parliament ==
New Zealand Parliament
Years	Term	Electorate	List	Party
2017–2020	52nd	Maungakiekie	63	National

In 2017 she announced she would seek selection as the National Party's candidate for Maungakiekie at the 2017 general election. On 7 March 2017 Lee was selected as National's candidate for Maungakiekie. She was elected at the 2017 general election with a majority of almost 2000 votes.

She resigned from her position as councillor for the Maungakiekie-Tāmaki ward, effective 12 October 2017, triggering a by-election held on 17 February 2018.

In her maiden speech, Lee noted that the driving force behind her political career was the death of her son. She said that;

Politics really did become personal for me then. A flick of the pen, the wording of an amendment, an exchange in this debating chamber—Parliament's processes affect everyday lives.

When the 52nd Parliament opened, she was appointed as a member of the Education and Workforce select committee.

During the 2020 New Zealand general election held on 17 October, on preliminary results Lee was ahead of Labour candidate Priyanca Radhakrishnan by a margin of 580 votes. However, when final results were released she lost the seat to Radhakrishnan by 635 votes.

In 2021 Lee returned to local government when she was elected as a trustee of Entrust, a trust for electricity consumers in Auckland.

New Zealand Parliament
Preceded by Sam Lotu-Iiga	Member of Parliament for Maungakiekie; 2017–2020	Succeeded by Priyanca Radhakrishnan
