= Sam Lotu-Iiga =

New Zealand politician (born 1970)

The Honourable Peseta Sam Lotu-Iiga
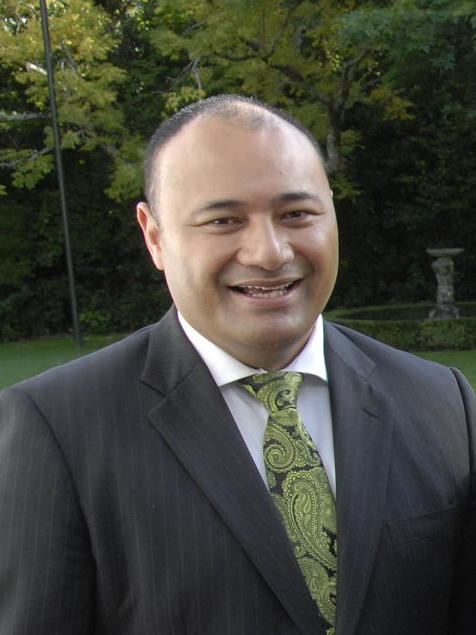
- Lotu-Iiga in 2009

Minister for Pacific Peoples (Note: As Minister of Pacific Island Affairs until 22 December 2015)
- In office 28 January 2014 – 20 December 2016
- Prime Minister: John Key; Bill English
- Preceded by: Hekia Parata
- Succeeded by: Alfred Ngaro

Minister of Local Government
- In office 14 December 2015 – 20 December 2016
- Prime Minister: John Key; Bill English
- Preceded by: Paula Bennett
- Succeeded by: Anne Tolley

Minister of Corrections
- In office 8 October 2014 – 14 December 2015
- Prime Minister: John Key
- Preceded by: Anne Tolley
- Succeeded by: Judith Collins

Member of the New Zealand Parliament for Maungakiekie
- In office 8 November 2008 – 23 September 2017
- Preceded by: Mark Gosche
- Succeeded by: Denise Lee

Personal details
- Born: Samuelu Masunu Lotu-Iiga; 2 November 1970 (age 56) Apia, Samoa
- Party: National
- Education: University of Auckland (LLB, BCom, MCom)
- Profession: Commercial lawyer; financial analyst; politician

Peseta Samuelu Masunu "Sam" Lotu-Iiga (born 2 November 1970) is a Samoan-born New Zealand commercial lawyer, financial analyst, and politician who served as Minister for Pacific Peoples in the Fifth National Government from 2014 to 2016. He was Member of the Member of Parliament (MP) for Maungakiekie from 2008 to 2017. Lotu-Iiga was one of two National Party Pasifika MPs. Lotu-Iiga holds the Samoan high chiefly title of Peseta.

== Early life ==
Samuelu Masunu Lotu-Iiga was born in Apia, Samoa on 2 November 1970. In 1973, Lotu-Iiga and his family moved to New Zealand as a child. He grew up in Māngere, South Auckland and attended Mangere Central Primary School. He then studied at Auckland Grammar School and the University of Auckland, where he earned an MCom(Hons) and a BCom/LLB. He also studied at the University of Cambridge where he earned an MBA.

== Professional career ==
While studying, Lotu-Iiga worked as an intern at the New Zealand Ministry of Foreign Affairs and Trade and in the Samoan Ministry of Land, Surveys and Environment. After graduating he joined Russell McVeagh McKenzie Bartleet in Auckland as a solicitor, working in the area of corporate and commercial law.

Lotu-Iiga later migrated to Britain, where he worked for Bankers Trust as a financial analyst. While at Cambridge, Lotu-Iiga played rugby for the New Zealand Barbarians. Lotu-Iiga moved to Sydney and worked as an executive consultant with Macquarie Bank. Later, he returned to New Zealand to work as a management consultant and adviser.

== Political career ==
New Zealand Parliament
Years	Term	Electorate	List	Party
2008–2011	49th	Maungakiekie	35	National
2011–2014	50th	Maungakiekie	29	National
2014–2017	51st	Maungakiekie	24	National

=== Local-government politics ===
Lotu-Iiga stood on the Citizens & Ratepayers' ticket for a seat on the Auckland City Council during the 2007 Auckland local body election in the Tamaki-Maungakiekie ward. Following his successful election, Lotu-Iiga was appointed Chairman of the City Development Committee on the Council under Mayor John Banks.

=== Election to Parliament: 2008–2011 ===
In February 2008 Lotu-Iiga put his name forward for the National Party selection for the Maungakiekie electorate. That month, incumbent Labour Party MP Mark Gosche, who held a majority of over 6,000 votes, announced he would stand down from the seat in the forthcoming general election. In April Lotu-Iiga defeated two other National Party nominees for the selection on the first ballot.

While the electoral boundaries for Maungakiekie had changed, removing Ōtāhuhu, the new boundary included the new suburbs of Royal Oak, Onehunga and Point England, which were considered to heavily favour the Labour Party. Gosche's large majority meant that Maungakiekie was still considered a safe Labour seat.

Lotu-Iiga ran a high-profile campaign, capitalising on his high name-recognition as a City Councillor, and heavily engaged in grass-roots campaigning, including door-knocking the electoral district. On election night, Lotu-Iiga beat Labour List MP Carol Beaumont by a margin of 1,942 votes in what was one of the largest electoral swings in the country. Lotu-Iiga became one of three National Party candidates in the Auckland region to claim a seat from Labour, along with Nikki Kaye in Auckland Central and Paula Bennett in Waitakere. In his first parliamentary term, Lotu-Iiga served as the Deputy-Chairperson of the Commerce Committee and as a member of the Finance and Expenditure Committee.

Lotu-Iiga faced some criticism for not resigning from his role as an Auckland City Councillor when he was elected as an MP. He missed a significant number of meetings, attending 12 out of 22 scheduled meetings. Lotu-Iiga responded: "People don't want a politician who's only going to meetings. It's only one part of our job. It's about going out meeting with people from the community. I feel like I'm doing fine. I'm busy but I'm on top of everything..." Lotu-Iiga eventually resigned his council post in October 2009.

=== Second term in Parliament: 2011–2014 ===
In November 2011, Lotu-Iiga was reelected the MP for Maungakiekie, beating Carol Beaumont a second time with an increased majority. Following the election, Lotu-Iiga was elected Chairperson of the Social Services Select Committee, where he has presided over the Government's welfare reform legislation.

In April 2013 he was one of 27 National MPs to vote against the Marriage (Definition of Marriage) Amendment Act 2013, claiming to support traditional values.

In January 2014, Lotu-Iiga was promoted into cabinet, becoming Minister of Pacific Island Affairs, and Associate Minister of Local Government.

=== Third term: 2014–2017 ===
On 8 October 2014, Lotu-Iiga received his warrants as Minister for Pacific Peoples, Minister for Ethnic Communities and Minister of Corrections.

On 7 December 2015, Prime Minister John Key announced that Lotu-Iiga would be handing the Corrections portfolio over to returning Cabinet Minister Judith Collins, and would take over the Local Government portfolio from Paula Bennett. The changes were effective from 14 December 2015.

On 13 December 2016, Lotu-Iiga announced that he was quitting politics, to take effect at the 2017 general election.

=== Post-political career ===
Following the 2017 election, Lotu-Iiga became Manukau Institute of Technology's deputy chief executive Pasifika on 25 September 2017.

== Personal life and community involvement ==
Sam Lotu-Iiga lives with his wife Jules in Onehunga. They have one daughter and one son. Lotu-Iiga is an active leader of the Pasifika community and holds the Samoan high chief (alii) title of Peseta. Lotu-Iiga is a patron of the Maungarei Cadets, the Dolphin Theatre and the Onehunga Bowling Club. Lotu-Iiga is a Christian and a member of the Royal Oak Baptist Church. He is also a member of the Rotary Club of Penrose. Lotu-Iiga has coached the Auckland under-14 rugby team and once served as a board member of the Primary health organisations of New Zealand.

Political offices
Preceded by Anne Tolley	Minister of Corrections; 2014–2015	Succeeded by Judith Collins
New Zealand Parliament
Preceded by Mark Gosche	Member of Parliament for Maungakiekie; 2008–2017	Succeeded by Denise Lee
