= Belinda Vernon =

New Zealand politician

Belinda Jane Vernon (born 1958) is a former New Zealand politician. She was an MP from 1996 to 2002, representing the National Party.

== Early life ==
Vernon attended Remuera Intermediate School (1970–71) and Diocesan School for Girls (1972–76). She gained a BComm from the University of Auckland. She commenced her professional life as an accountant for a London shipping company. Back in New Zealand, she became financial controller, and then company secretary, for a trans-Tasman shipping company.

== Member of Parliament ==
New Zealand Parliament
Years	Term	Electorate	List	Party
1996–1999	45th	Maungakiekie	18	National
1999–2002	46th	List	10	National

The voters of the Auckland seat of Maungakiekie elected Vernon as their electorate Member of Parliament in the 1996 election, but she lost the seat to Labour's Mark Gosche in the 1999 election, returning to Parliament as a list MP. In the 2002 election she failed to re-take Maungakiekie, and owing to the collapse of National's vote that year, was not high enough on the party list to return to Parliament.

From 2001, Vernon served as National's spokesperson for Transport and for Arts, Culture and Heritage.

== After politics ==
Vernon was a trustee of the Motutapu Restoration Trust from 2002 to 2012. On 1 July 2011 she was appointed as a director at GNS Science. On 27 February 2013 she was appointed to the board of Maritime New Zealand.

In 2025, Vernon took part in the unofficial cross-party People's Select Committee, led by Marilyn Waring, which investigated the pay equity changes by the National government.

New Zealand Parliament
New constituency	Member of Parliament for Maungakiekie; 1996–1999	Succeeded by Mark Gosche
