= Mark Gosche =

New Zealand politician

The Honourable Vui Mark Gosche
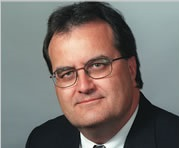

6th Minister of Corrections
- In office 15 August 2002 – 12 May 2003
- Prime Minister: Helen Clark
- Preceded by: Matt Robson
- Succeeded by: Paul Swain

6th Minister of Pacific Island Affairs
- In office 10 December 1999 – 12 May 2003
- Prime Minister: Helen Clark
- Preceded by: Tuariki Delamere
- Succeeded by: Phil Goff

19th Minister of Housing
- In office 10 December 1999 – 12 May 2003
- Prime Minister: Helen Clark
- Preceded by: Murray McCully
- Succeeded by: Steve Maharey

19th Minister of Transport
- In office 10 December 1999 – 27 July 2002
- Prime Minister: Helen Clark
- Preceded by: Maurice Williamson
- Succeeded by: Paul Swain

Member of the New Zealand Parliament for Maungakiekie
- In office 27 November 1999 – 8 November 2008
- Preceded by: Belinda Vernon
- Succeeded by: Sam Lotu-Iiga

Member of the New Zealand Parliament for Labour party list
- In office 12 October 1996 – 27 November 1999

Personal details
- Born: 2 December 1955 (age 70) Auckland, New Zealand
- Party: Labour
- Spouse: Carol
- Children: 4

Mark James Gosche (born 2 December 1955) is a New Zealand politician. He is a member of the Labour Party. He was born in Auckland to Samoan parents, and has been active in New Zealand's Pasifika community.

== Biography ==
=== Early life and career ===
Gosche was born in 1955 to German-Samoan parents. He was raised and educated in South Auckland. He was a full-time official with the Hotel, Hospital & Restaurant Workers Union later the Service & Food Workers Union − or SFWU) for 15 years. He was later a union secretary with the SFWU for 7 years. This led him to join the Labour Party in 1981.

Gosche founded the Union Health Centres (four low cost medical centres for union members, doctors and nurses) and was the original director of the organisation. He was a trustee of the Union Law Centre and a member of the national executive of the New Zealand Council of Trade Unions (NZCTU). He was also on several boards including the Trade Union Authority and New Zealand Tourism Council.

=== Member of Parliament ===
New Zealand Parliament
Years	Term	Electorate	List	Party
1996–1999	45th	List	5	Labour
1999–2002	46th	Maungakiekie	20	Labour
2002–2005	47th	Maungakiekie	10	Labour
2005–2008	48th	Maungakiekie	29	Labour

He was first elected to Parliament as a list MP in the 1996 election, and was seen as a key bridge builder between Labour and the Alliance. He was later MP for the Auckland seat of Maungakiekie following the 1999 election. He held a number of Cabinet posts, including Minister of Corrections, Minister of Housing, Minister of Transport, and Minister of Pacific Island Affairs. In May 2003, however, he resigned all his ministerial roles due to the serious illness of his wife, who had suffered a brain haemorrhage.

At the 2008 election, Gosche retired from politics to spend more time with his family.

=== Post-parliamentary career ===
In 2009 he was nominated as a director on the New Zealand Rugby League board, being confirmed on 27 June. On 31 May 2011 Gosche was elected the Chairman of the Asia Pacific Rugby League Confederation. Gosche's term on the NZRL board ended in 2012 after he decided not reapply for the position.

Gosche is the Chief Executive of Vaka Tautua, a role he took up in July 2014 after five years on the governance board. Vaka Tautua is a not-for-profit ‘for Pacific by Pacific’ community health and social service provider working in the areas of disability, mental health, older people, family violence and financial capability – with offices in Auckland, Wellington and Christchurch. The governance board and staff of Vaka Tautua are almost all of Pacific Island heritage and all operational staff are bilingual.

Since leaving politics he has held a large number of governance roles including being Chief Advisor Strategic Relationships at the Ministry of Pacific Island Affairs in Auckland, TYLA Trust, COMET Auckland, Vaka Tautua, Brain Injury Association, Talklink Trust and Fonua Ola. He currently serves on the board of Lifewise and was recently elected to the Mt. Wellington Licensing Trust which owns and operates hotel and conference centres – the profits of which are returned to the community via a charitable trust. Gosche's experience is also informed by his wife Carol whom he is a caregiver for. Carol, had a severe brain haemorrhage in 2002. He and his wife had four children.

Gosche is currently employed by the Manukau Institute of Technology as External Relations Manager for MIT's Pasifika Development office.

At the 2016 Auckland elections, Gosche was elected to the Mt Wellington Licensing Trust. In April 2018 Gosche was appointed chair of the Counties Manukau District Health Board, effective 3 May 2018.

In June 2018 Housing and Urban Development Minister Phil Twyford announced Gosche as deputy chair of the Housing New Zealand (Kāinga Ora) board. He became chair of the board and resigned from that position in 2024.

== Honours and awards ==
In 1990, Gosche was awarded the New Zealand 1990 Commemoration Medal. In April 2007, he was bestowed with the Samoan matai title Vui at his grandmother's village of Lano in Samoa.

== Notes ==
Political offices
Preceded by Murray McCully	Minister of Housing; 1999–2003	Succeeded by Steve Maharey
Preceded by Maurice Williamson	Minister of Transport; 1999–2002	Succeeded by Paul Swain
New Zealand Parliament
Preceded by Belinda Vernon	Member of Parliament for Maungakiekie; 1999–2008	Succeeded by Sam Lotu-Iiga
