= Speaker of the New Zealand House of Representatives =

Presiding officer of the New Zealand House of Representatives

- Te Mana Whakawā o te Whare (Māori)
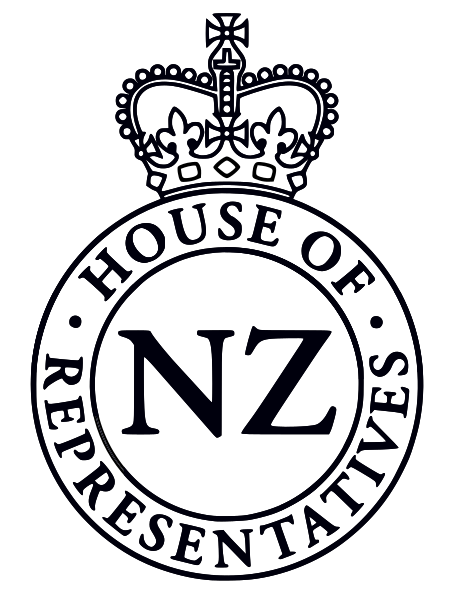

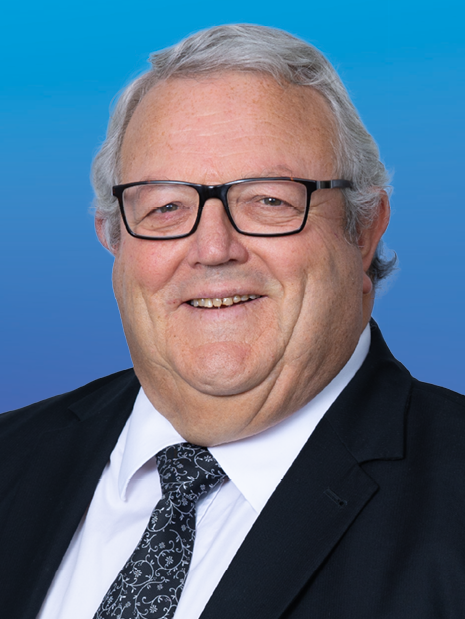
- Incumbent; Gerry Brownlee since 5 December 2023
- Style: The Right Honourable
- Residence: Speaker's Apartments, Parliament House, Wellington
- Nominator: New Zealand House of Representatives
- Appointer: Governor-General of New Zealand; at the behest of the House of Representatives
- Term length: At His Majesty's pleasure; elected by the House at the start of each Parliament, and upon a vacancy
- Inaugural holder: Sir Charles Clifford
- Formation: 1854
- Website: Office of the Speaker

In New Zealand, the speaker of the House of Representatives, commonly known as the speaker of the House (Māori: te mana whakawā o te Whare), is the presiding officer and highest authority of the New Zealand House of Representatives. The individual who holds the position is elected by members of the House from among their number in the first session after each general election. They hold one of the highest-ranking offices in New Zealand. The current Speaker is Gerry Brownlee, who was elected on 5 December 2023.

The speaker's role – similar to that of speakers in other countries that use the Westminster system – involves presiding over debates by determining who may speak, maintaining order during debate, and disciplining members who break the rules of the House. Aside from duties relating to presiding over the House, the speaker also performs administrative and procedural functions, and remains a member of Parliament (MP).

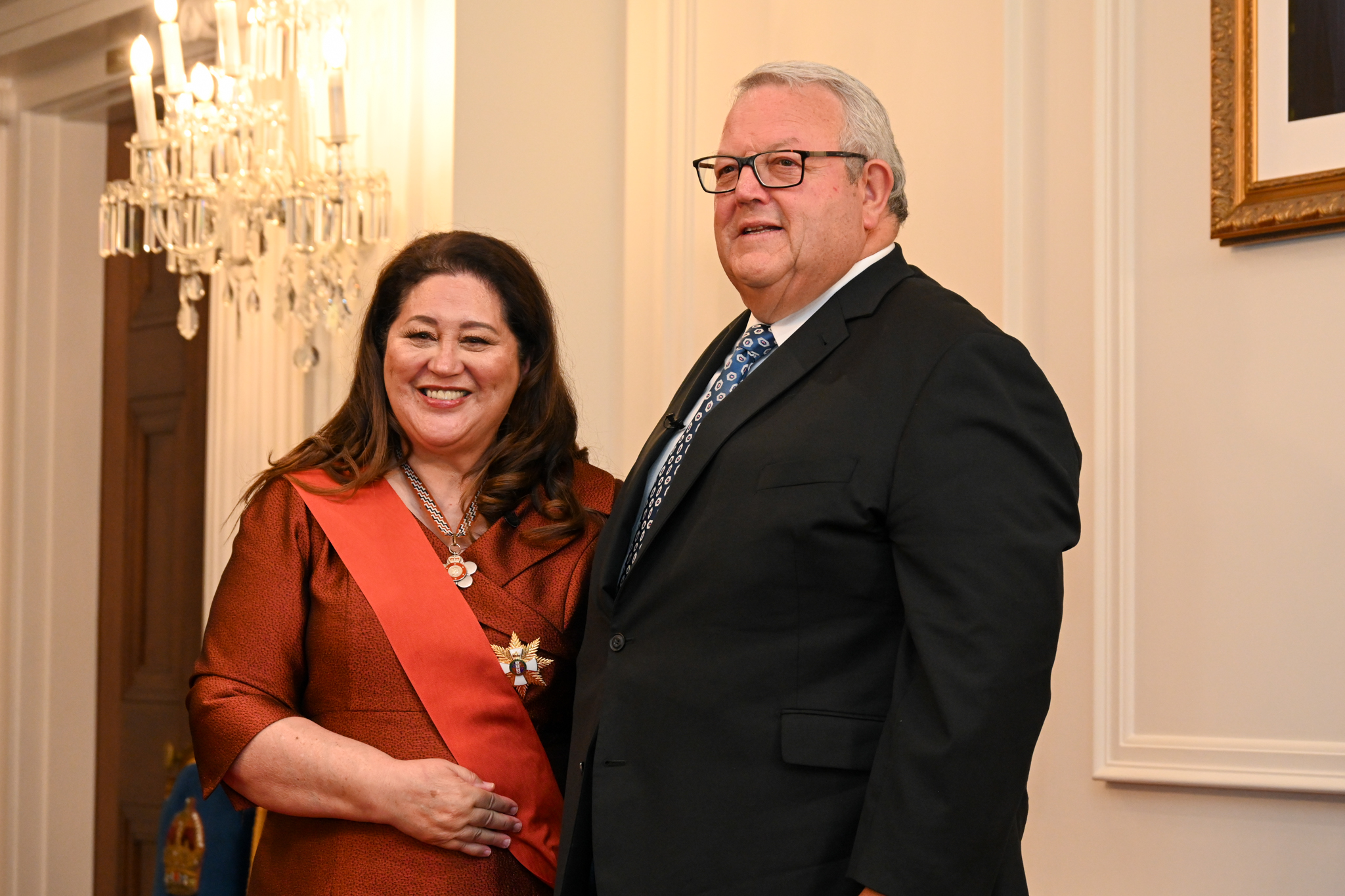
Current Speaker Gerry Brownlee at his confirmation as Speaker with Governor-General Cindy Kiro

== Role ==
=== In the debating chamber ===
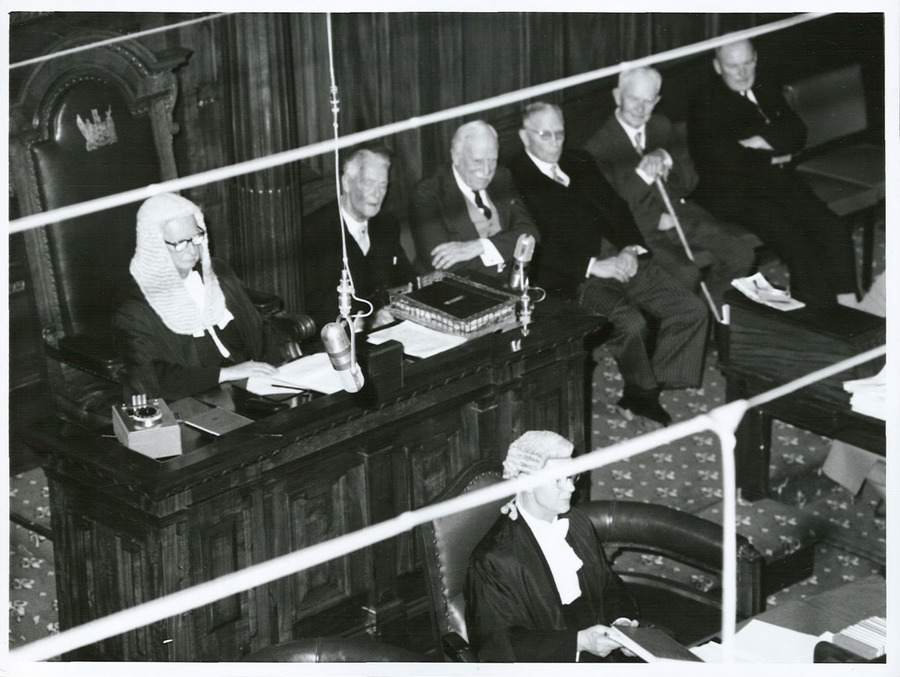
The Speaker, Ronald Algie (wearing the wig and gown), seated in the chair in the debating chamber, 1966

The speaker's most visible role is that of presiding over the House of Representatives when it is in session. The speaker presides from an elevated chair behind the Table in the debating chamber. This involves overseeing the order in which business is conducted, and determining who should speak at what time. The speaker is also responsible for granting or declining requests for certain events, such as a snap debate on a particular issue.

An important part of the speaker's role is enforcing discipline in the House. They are expected to conduct the business of the House in an impartial manner.The speaker defers to 'Standing Orders', which are the written rules of order governing the business of the House. Included in these rules are certain powers available to the speaker to ensure reasonable behaviour by MPs, including the ability to order disruptive MPs to leave the debating chamber. MPs who feel one of these rules has been breached by another member can interrupt a debate by using a procedure known as a 'point of order'. The speaker must then determine whether the complaint is just. Earlier speakers' rulings on similar points of order are referred to in considering the point raised. The clerk of the House, who sits directly in front of the speaker, assists the speaker in making such rulings.

By convention, speakers have traditionally been addressed inside the debating chamber as "Mr Speaker" or "Madam Speaker".

=== Outside the debating chamber ===
The speaker is also responsible for directing and overseeing the administration and security of the buildings and grounds of Parliament, and the general provision of services to members. In doing so, the speaker consults and receives advice from the Parliamentary Service Commission, which comprises MPs from across the House.

As the most senior office of Parliament, the speaker has other statutory responsibilities, for example, publishing notices of vacancies in the House under the Electoral Act 1993.

In recognition of this role a portion of the Parliament Buildings are given over to the speaker. Known as the Speaker's Apartments these include his personal office, sitting rooms for visiting dignitaries, and a small residential flat which the speaker may or may not use as living quarters.

The speaker chairs three select committees:

- the Standing Orders Committee
- the Business Committee
- the Officers of Parliament Committee.

The Business Committee controls the organisation of the business of the House. Also on the committee, established after the first mixed member proportional (MMP) election in 1996, is the leader of the House, the Opposition shadow leader, and the party whips.

=== Neutrality ===
The speaker is expected to conduct the functions of the office in a neutral manner, even though the speaker is generally a member of the governing party. Only three people have held the office despite not being from the governing party. In 1923, Charles Statham (an independent, but formerly a member of the Reform Party) was backed by Reform so as not to endanger the party's slim majority, and later retained his position under the United Party. In 1993, Peter Tapsell (a member of the Labour Party) was backed by the National Party for the same reason. Bill Barnard, who had been elected Speaker in 1936, resigned from the Labour Party in 1940 but retained his position.

Historically, a convention developed that a speaker did not vote, except when a vote was tied. The speaker's lack of a vote created problems for a governing party – when the party's majority was small, the loss of the speaker's vote could be problematic. Since the shift to MMP in 1996, however, the speaker has been counted for the purposes of casting party votes, to reflect the proportionality of the party's vote in the general election. The speaker must also participate in personal votes, but does not leave the chair, instead asking another member to vote for them by proxy. With the speaker no longer having a casting vote, in the event of a tied vote the motion in question is lost.

== Election ==
The speaker is always a member of Parliament (MP), and is elected to the position by other MPs at the beginning of a parliamentary term, or when a speaker dies, resigns or is removed from the position (via a vote of no confidence) intra-term. The election of a speaker is presided over by the clerk of the House. It is unusual for an election to be contested, with only six votes since 1854 having more than one candidate. The first such contested vote did not occur for 69 years until 1923. It took 73 years for the second contested vote for Speaker in 1996. If there are two candidates, members vote in the lobbies for their preferred candidate. In the case of three or more candidates, a roll-call vote is conducted and the candidate with the fewest votes eliminated, with the process continuing (or reverting to a two-way run-off) until one candidate has a majority. Members may vote only if they are present in person: no proxy votes are permitted.

It is traditional for the newly elected speaker to pretend he or she did not want to accept the position; the speaker feigns resistance as they are 'dragged' to their chair, in a practice dating from the days when British speakers risked execution if the news they reported to the king was displeasing.

After being elected by the House, the speaker-elect is formally confirmed in office by the governor-general. At the start of a term of Parliament, the newly confirmed speaker follows the tradition of claiming the privileges of the House, such as freedom of speech in debate and to free access to the Governor-General whenever occasion may require it.

== Precedence, salary and privileges ==
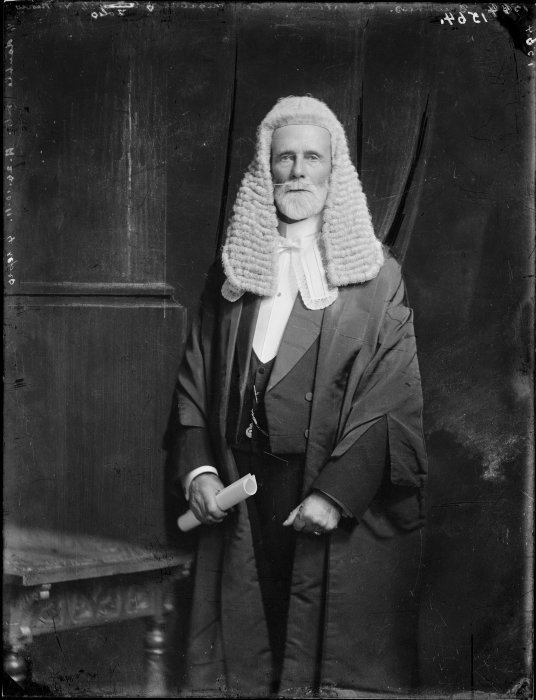
Speaker Sir Arthur Guinness, wearing the speaker's wig, 1911. The formal wig fell into disuse some decades later.

Each day, prior to the sitting of the House of Representatives, the speaker and other officials travel in procession from the speaker's personal apartments to the debating chamber. The procession includes the doorkeeper, the serjeant-at-arms, the speaker and the speaker's assistant. When the speaker reaches the chamber, the serjeant-at-arms announces their arrival and places the mace on the Table of the House.

As of 2026, the annual salary is NZ$327,100.

The office is third most important constitutionally, after the governor-general and the prime minister. (See New Zealand order of precedence.)

=== Official dress ===
Originally, speakers wore a gown and full bottomed judge's wig in the chamber. This practice has fallen into disuse since the 1990s. Speakers now generally wear what they feel appropriate, usually an academic gown of their highest held degree or a Māori cloak.

== Holders of the office ==
The current Speaker is Gerry Brownlee, a member of the National Party.

Since the creation of Parliament, 32 people have held the office of speaker. Two people have held the office on more than one occasion. A full list of speakers is below.

Key

† indicates Speaker died in office.

Independent Liberal Reform United Labour Democratic Labour National

No.	Portrait	Name Electorate (Birth–Death)	Term of office		Party	Parliament
No.	Portrait	Name Electorate (Birth–Death)	Term start	Term end	Party	Parliament
1		Sir Charles Clifford; MP for City of Wellington (1813–1893)	31 May 1854	12 December 1860	Independent	1st
1		Sir Charles Clifford; MP for City of Wellington (1813–1893)	31 May 1854	12 December 1860	Independent	2nd
2		Sir David Monro; MP for Picton (until 1866); MP for Cheviot (from 1866) (1813–1877)	3 June 1861	13 September 1870	Independent	3rd
2		Sir David Monro; MP for Picton (until 1866); MP for Cheviot (from 1866) (1813–1877)	3 June 1861	13 September 1870	Independent	4th
3		Sir Dillon Bell; MP for Mataura (1822–1898)	14 August 1871	21 October 1875	Independent	5th
4		Sir William Fitzherbert; MP for Hutt (1810–1891)	15 June 1876	11 August 1879	Independent	6th
5		Sir Maurice O'Rorke; MP for Onehunga (until 1881); MP for Manukau (from 1881) (1830–1916)	24 September 1879	17 September 1890	Independent	7th
5		Sir Maurice O'Rorke; MP for Onehunga (until 1881); MP for Manukau (from 1881) (1830–1916)	24 September 1879	17 September 1890	Independent	8th
5		Sir Maurice O'Rorke; MP for Onehunga (until 1881); MP for Manukau (from 1881) (1830–1916)	24 September 1879	17 September 1890	Independent	9th
5		Sir Maurice O'Rorke; MP for Onehunga (until 1881); MP for Manukau (from 1881) (1830–1916)	24 September 1879	17 September 1890	Independent	10th
6		William Steward; MP for Waimate (1841–1912)	23 January 1891	8 November 1893	Liberal	11th
(5)		Sir Maurice O'Rorke; MP for Manukau (1830–1916)	21 June 1894	3 October 1902	Liberal	12th
(5)		Sir Maurice O'Rorke; MP for Manukau (1830–1916)	21 June 1894	3 October 1902	Liberal	13th
(5)		Sir Maurice O'Rorke; MP for Manukau (1830–1916)	21 June 1894	3 October 1902	Liberal	14th
7		Sir Arthur Guinness; MP for Grey (1846–1913)	29 June 1903	10 June 1913†	Liberal	15th
7		Sir Arthur Guinness; MP for Grey (1846–1913)	29 June 1903	10 June 1913†	Liberal	16th
7		Sir Arthur Guinness; MP for Grey (1846–1913)	29 June 1903	10 June 1913†	Liberal	17th
7		Sir Arthur Guinness; MP for Grey (1846–1913)	29 June 1903	10 June 1913†	Liberal	18th
8		Sir Frederic Lang; MP for Manukau (1852–1937)	26 June 1913	31 October 1922	Independent	18th
8		Sir Frederic Lang; MP for Manukau (1852–1937)	26 June 1913	31 October 1922	Reform	19th
8		Sir Frederic Lang; MP for Manukau (1852–1937)	26 June 1913	31 October 1922	Reform	20th
9		Sir Charles Statham; MP for Dunedin Central (1875–1946)	7 February 1923	1 November 1935	Independent	21st
9		Sir Charles Statham; MP for Dunedin Central (1875–1946)	7 February 1923	1 November 1935	Independent	22nd
9		Sir Charles Statham; MP for Dunedin Central (1875–1946)	7 February 1923	1 November 1935	Independent	23rd
9		Sir Charles Statham; MP for Dunedin Central (1875–1946)	7 February 1923	1 November 1935	Independent	24th
10		Bill Barnard; MP for Napier (1886–1958)	25 March 1936	25 September 1943	Labour	25th
10		Bill Barnard; MP for Napier (1886–1958)	25 March 1936	25 September 1943	Labour	26th
10		Bill Barnard; MP for Napier (1886–1958)	25 March 1936	25 September 1943	Democratic Labour	26th
11		Bill Schramm; MP for Auckland East (1886–1962)	22 February 1944	12 October 1946	Labour	27th
12		Robert McKeen; MP for Island Bay (1884–1974)	24 June 1947	21 October 1949	Labour	28th
13		Matthew Oram; MP for Manawatu (1885–1969)	27 June 1950	25 October 1957	National	30th
13		Matthew Oram; MP for Manawatu (1885–1969)	27 June 1950	25 October 1957	National	31st
14		Robert Macfarlane; MP for Christchurch Central (1900–1981)	21 January 1958	28 October 1960	Labour	32nd
15		Ronald Algie; MP for Remuera (1888–1978)	20 June 1961	26 November 1966	National	33rd
15		Ronald Algie; MP for Remuera (1888–1978)	20 June 1961	26 November 1966	National	34th
16		Sir Roy Jack; MP for Waimarino (1914–1977)	26 April 1967	9 February 1972	National	35th
16		Sir Roy Jack; MP for Waimarino (1914–1977)	26 April 1967	9 February 1972	National	36th
17		Alf Allen; MP for Franklin (1912–1987)	7 June 1972	26 October 1972	National	36th
18		Stan Whitehead; MP for Nelson (1907–1976)	14 February 1973	10 October 1975	Labour	37th
(16)		Sir Roy Jack; MP for Rangitikei (1914–1977)	22 June 1976	24 December 1977†	National	38th
19		Sir Richard Harrison; MP for Hawke's Bay (1921–2003)	10 May 1978	14 July 1984	National	39th
19		Sir Richard Harrison; MP for Hawke's Bay (1921–2003)	10 May 1978	14 July 1984	National	40th
20		Sir Basil Arthur; MP for Timaru (1928–1985)	15 August 1984	1 May 1985†	Labour	41st
21		Sir Gerry Wall; MP for Porirua (1920–1992)	28 May 1985	16 September 1987	Labour	41st
22		Sir Kerry Burke; MP for West Coast (born 1942)	16 September 1987	28 November 1990	Labour	42nd
23		Robin Gray; MP for Clutha (1931–2022)	28 November 1990	21 December 1993	National	43rd
24		Peter Tapsell; MP for Eastern Maori (1930–2012)	21 December 1993	12 December 1996	Labour	44th
25		Doug Kidd; MP for Kaikoura (born 1941)	12 December 1996	20 December 1999	National	45th
26		Jonathan Hunt; List MP (1938–2024)	20 December 1999	3 March 2005	Labour	46th
26		Jonathan Hunt; List MP (1938–2024)	20 December 1999	3 March 2005	Labour	47th
27		Margaret Wilson; List MP (born 1947)	3 March 2005	8 December 2008	Labour	47th
27		Margaret Wilson; List MP (born 1947)	3 March 2005	8 December 2008	Labour	48th
28		Lockwood Smith; MP for Rodney (until 2011); List MP (from 2011) (born 1948)	8 December 2008	31 January 2013	National	49th
28		Lockwood Smith; MP for Rodney (until 2011); List MP (from 2011) (born 1948)	8 December 2008	31 January 2013	National	50th
29		David Carter; List MP (born 1952)	31 January 2013	7 November 2017	National	50th
29		David Carter; List MP (born 1952)	31 January 2013	7 November 2017	National	51st
30		Trevor Mallard; List MP (born 1954)	7 November 2017	24 August 2022	Labour	52nd
30		Trevor Mallard; List MP (born 1954)	7 November 2017	24 August 2022	Labour	53rd
31		Adrian Rurawhe; MP for Te Tai Hauāuru (1961–2026)	24 August 2022	5 December 2023	Labour	53rd
32		Gerry Brownlee; List MP (born 1956)	5 December 2023	3 December 2026	National	54th

== Deputies ==
There are currently four presiding officers appointed to deputise for the Speaker:

- Deputy Speaker: Barbara Kuriger
- First Assistant Speaker: Maureen Pugh
- Second Assistant Speaker: Greg O'Connor
- Third Assistant Speaker: Teanau Tuiono

Between 1854 and 1992, the Chairman of Committees chaired the House when in Committee of the whole House (i.e., taking a bill's committee stage) and presided in the absence of the Speaker or when the Speaker so requested. These arrangements were based on those of the House of Commons of the United Kingdom. Until 1992, the Chairman of Committees was known as the Deputy Speaker only when presiding over the House. That year, the position of Deputy Speaker was made official, and the role of Chairman of Committees was discontinued. The first Deputy Speaker was appointed on 10 November 1992. Additionally, two Assistant Speakers are usually appointed. The first Assistant Speaker was appointed in 1996, replacing the position of Deputy Chairman of Committees, which had been established in 1975. The Deputy Speaker and Assistant Speakers take the chair and may exercise the Speaker's authority in their absence.

Notably during the 53rd New Zealand Parliament a succession of temporary Assistant Speakers were appointed. Ian McKelvie was appointed as a third Assistant Speaker from 1 March 2022 but only while the House was sitting with some members participating remotely during the COVID-19 pandemic. Two further temporary Assistant Speakers (David Bennett and Greg O'Connor) were added for the sitting week of 9 to 11 August 2022, to cover absences. Barbara Kuriger was added for the period of 22 to 26 November 2022, when the government accorded urgency to business as a result of the sitting time lost from the death of Elizabeth II. Poto Williams was reappointed as Assistant Speaker during the final week of the Parliament, from 29 to 31 August. A review of standing orders at the end of the Parliament recommended a permanent appointment of a third Assistant Speaker starting from the 54th Parliament.

=== Deputy speakers ===
Key

National Labour

No.	Portrait	Name Electorate (Birth–Death)	Term of office		Party	Parliament
No.	Portrait	Name Electorate (Birth–Death)	Term start	Term end	Party	Parliament
1		Jim Gerard; MP for Rangiora (born 1936)	10 November 1992	12 October 1996	National	43rd
1		Jim Gerard; MP for Rangiora (born 1936)	10 November 1992	12 October 1996	National	44th
2		Ian Revell; MP for Northcote (born 1948)	13 December 1996	18 February 1999	National	45th
3		Geoff Braybrooke; MP for Napier (1935–2013)	17 March 1999	27 July 2002	Labour	45th
3		Geoff Braybrooke; MP for Napier (1935–2013)	17 March 1999	27 July 2002	Labour	46th
4		Ann Hartley; MP for Northcote (1942–2024)	27 August 2002	19 September 2005	Labour	47th
5		Clem Simich; List MP (born 1939)	8 November 2005	8 November 2008	National	48th
6		Lindsay Tisch; MP for Waikato (born 1947)	9 December 2008	26 November 2011	National	49th
7		Eric Roy; MP for Invercargill (born 1948)	21 December 2011	20 September 2014	National	50th
8		Chester Borrows; MP for Whanganui (1957–2023)	21 October 2014	23 September 2017	National	51st
9		Anne Tolley; MP for East Coast (born 1953)	8 November 2017	17 October 2020	National	52nd
10		Adrian Rurawhe; MP for Te Tai Hauāuru (1961–2026)	26 November 2020	24 August 2022	Labour	53rd
11		Greg O'Connor; MP for Ōhāriu (born 1958)	25 August 2022	6 December 2023	Labour	53rd
12		Barbara Kuriger; MP for Taranaki-King Country (born 1961)	6 December 2023	Incumbent	National	54th

=== First assistant speakers ===
Key

National Labour United NZ

No.	Portrait	Name Electorate (Birth–Death)	Term of office		Party	Parliament
No.	Portrait	Name Electorate (Birth–Death)	Term start	Term end	Party	Parliament
1		Peter Hilt; MP for Glenfield (1942–2025)	21 February 1996	12 October 1996	United NZ	44th
2		Geoff Braybrooke; MP for Napier (1935–2013)	18 February 1997	17 March 1999	Labour	45th
3		Brian Neeson; MP for Waipareira (born 1945)	17 March 1999	27 November 1999	National	45th
4		Jill Pettis; MP for Whanganui (born 1952)	21 December 1999	27 July 2002	Labour	46th
5		Ross Robertson; MP for Manukau East (born 1949)	27 August 2002	8 November 2008	Labour	47th
5		Ross Robertson; MP for Manukau East (born 1949)	27 August 2002	8 November 2008	Labour	48th
6		Eric Roy; MP for Invercargill (born 1948)	9 December 2008	26 November 2011	National	49th
7		Lindsay Tisch; MP for Waikato (born 1947)	21 December 2011	23 September 2017	National	50th
7		Lindsay Tisch; MP for Waikato (born 1947)	21 December 2011	23 September 2017	National	51st
8		Poto Williams; MP for Christchurch East (born 1962)	8 November 2017	3 July 2019	Labour	52nd
9		Ruth Dyson; MP for Port Hills (born 1957)	3 July 2019	17 October 2020	Labour	52nd
10		Jenny Salesa; MP for Panmure-Ōtāhuhu (born 1968)	26 November 2020	6 December 2023	Labour	53rd
11		Maureen Pugh; MP for West Coast-Tasman (born 1958)	6 December 2023	Incumbent	National	54th

=== Second assistant speakers ===
Key

National Labour

No.	Portrait	Name Electorate (Birth–Death)	Term of office		Party	Parliament
No.	Portrait	Name Electorate (Birth–Death)	Term start	Term end	Party	Parliament
1		Marie Hasler; MP for Waitakere (born 1942)	18 February 1997	8 September 1998	National	45th
2		Eric Roy; List MP (born 1948)	10 September 1998	27 July 2002	National	45th
2		Eric Roy; List MP (born 1948)	10 September 1998	27 July 2002	National	46th
3		Clem Simich; MP for Tāmaki (born 1939)	27 August 2002	19 September 2005	National	47th
4		Ann Hartley; List MP (1942–2024)	8 November 2005	28 February 2008	Labour	48th
5		Marian Hobbs; MP for Wellington Central (born 1947)	4 March 2008	8 November 2008	Labour	48th
6		Rick Barker; List MP (born 1951)	9 December 2008	12 April 2011	Labour	49th
7		Ross Robertson; MP for Manukau East (born 1949)	12 April 2011	20 September 2014	Labour	49th
7		Ross Robertson; MP for Manukau East (born 1949)	12 April 2011	20 September 2014	Labour	50th
8		Trevor Mallard; MP for Hutt South (born 1954)	21 October 2014	23 September 2017	Labour	51st
9		Adrian Rurawhe; MP for Te Tai Hauāuru (1961–2026)	8 November 2017	26 November 2020	Labour	52nd
10		Jacqui Dean; MP for Waitaki (born 1957)	26 November 2020	14 October 2023	National	53rd
11		Greg O'Connor; MP for Ōhāriu (born 1958)	6 December 2023	Incumbent	Labour	54th

=== Third assistant speakers ===
Key

Green

No.	Portrait	Name Electorate (Birth–Death)	Term of office		Party	Parliament
No.	Portrait	Name Electorate (Birth–Death)	Term start	Term end	Party	Parliament
1		Teanau Tuiono; List MP (born 1972)	7 December 2023	Incumbent	Green	54th

=== Temporary assistant speakers ===
Key

National Labour

No.	Portrait	Name Electorate (Birth–Death)	Term of office		Party	Parliament
No.	Portrait	Name Electorate (Birth–Death)	Term start	Term end	Party	Parliament
1		Ian McKelvie; MP for Rangitīkei (born 1952)	1 March 2022	8 September 2023	National	53rd
2		David Bennett; List MP (born 1970)	9 August 2022	11 August 2022	National	53rd
3		Greg O'Connor; MP for Ōhāriu (born 1958)	9 August 2022	11 August 2022	Labour	53rd
4		Barbara Kuriger; MP for Taranaki-King Country (born 1961)	22 November 2022	26 November 2022	National	53rd
5		Poto Williams; MP for Christchurch East (born 1962)	29 August 2023	31 August 2023	Labour	53rd
6		Jenny Salesa; MP for Panmure-Ōtāhuhu (born 1968)	14 February 2024	15 February 2024	Labour	54th

== See also ==
- Speaker of the New Zealand Legislative Council
- Constitution of New Zealand
