= Marriage (Definition of Marriage) Amendment Act 2013 =

New Zealand law legalising gay marriage

New Zealand Parliament
- Citation: 2013 No 20
- Passed by: House of Representatives
- Passed: 17 April 2013
- Royal assent: 19 April 2013
- Commenced: 19 August 2013
- Administered by: Ministry of Justice

Legislative history
- Bill title: Marriage (Definition of Marriage) Amendment Bill
- Bill citation: Member's Bill 39
- Introduced by: Louisa Wall
- Introduced: 26 July 2012
- First reading: 29 August 2012
- Second reading: 13 March 2013
- Third reading: 17 April 2013
- Committee report: 27 February 2013

Related legislation
- Marriage Act 1955; Civil Union Act 2004
- Status: Current legislation

The Marriage (Definition of Marriage) Amendment Act 2013 is an Act of Parliament in New Zealand, which since 19 August 2013, allows same-sex couples to legally marry.

The Act was proposed as a member's bill by MP Louisa Wall in May 2012, and was drawn from the ballot in July of that year. It passed its third reading in the House of Representatives on 17 April 2013, and became law when it received the Royal Assent two days later.

== Introduction and initial discussion ==
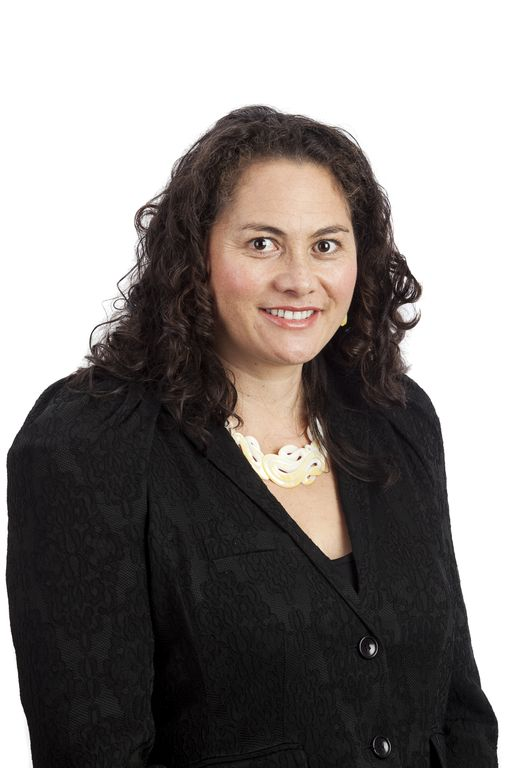
Louisa Wall, proponent of the Marriage (Definition of Marriage) Amendment Bill

On 14 May 2012, openly lesbian Labour Party MP Louisa Wall (Manurewa) stated that she would introduce a member's bill, the Marriage (Definition of Marriage) Amendment Bill, allowing adult couples of any gender to marry, including same-sex and different sex couples. The bill was submitted to the member's bill ballot on 30 May 2012. Openly gay Green Party MP Kevin Hague (list) also submitted a same-sex marriage bill, the Marriage (Equality) Amendment Bill, to the ballot on 24 June. Wall and Hague stated that they planned to work together in support of whichever bill came up first.

On 26 July 2012, a ballot draw of five member's bills saw Wall's Marriage (Definition of Marriage) Amendment Bill drawn and introduced. In its introductory form, the bill would insert a definition of "marriage" into Section 2 of the Marriage Act 1955 as "the union of 2 people regardless of their sex, sexual orientation, or gender identity"; it would also replace Schedule 2 – the list of prohibited degrees of marriage – with a new schedule using gender-neutral terms.

Prime Minister John Key had stated that he would support any same-sex marriage bill in its first reading initially, but after Louisa Wall's bill was drawn Key stated that he would support it through all stages. Opposition leader David Shearer also declared his support for Wall's bill and said that Labour Party MPs would be allowed to cast conscience votes. New Zealand First announced it would abstain, and that the legalisation of same-sex marriage should be put to a referendum. However, at the first reading, all New Zealand First MPs opposed the bill, largely because abstentions reduce the majority needed for a bill to pass.

== First reading ==
On 29 August 2012, the bill passed its first reading on a conscience vote with 80 votes in favour, 40 votes against, and one abstention. The vote was originally recorded as 78 votes in favour and three abstentions, due to the National Party whips forgetting to cast proxy votes in favour for John Banks and Peter Dunne (both National Party whips voted against the bill and therefore were in the wrong lobby to cast votes in favour).

Marriage (Definition of Marriage) Amendment Bill – First Reading
Party	Votes for	Votes against	Abstentions
National	30: Amy Adams; Chris Auchinvole; Maggie Barry; Paula Bennett; Jackie Blue; Gerry Brownlee; Cam Calder; David Carter; Jonathan Coleman; Judith Collins; Jacqui Dean; Craig Foss; Paul Goldsmith; Jo Goodhew; Tim Groser; Tau Henare; Paul Hutchison; Steven Joyce; Nikki Kaye; John Key; Murray McCully; Ian McKelvie; Hekia Parata; Jami-Lee Ross; Scott Simpson; Lockwood Smith; Chris Tremain; Nicky Wagner; Kate Wilkinson; Maurice Williamson	29: Shane Ardern; Kanwal Singh Bakshi; David Bennett; Chester Borrows; Simon Bridges; Bill English; Chris Finlayson; Nathan Guy; John Hayes; Phil Heatley; Colin King; Melissa Lee; Sam Lotu-Iiga; Tim Macindoe; Todd McClay; Mark Mitchell; Alfred Ngaro; Simon O'Connor; Eric Roy; Tony Ryall; Mike Sabin; Katrina Shanks; Nick Smith; Lindsay Tisch; Anne Tolley; Louise Upston; Michael Woodhouse; Jian Yang; Jonathan Young	–
Labour	30: Jacinda Ardern; Charles Chauvel; David Clark; Clayton Cosgrove; David Cunliffe; Clare Curran; Lianne Dalziel; Ruth Dyson; Kris Faafoi; Darien Fenton; Phil Goff; Chris Hipkins; Parekura Horomia; Shane Jones; Annette King; Iain Lees-Galloway; Andrew Little; Moana Mackey; Nanaia Mahuta; Trevor Mallard; Sue Moroney; David Parker; Rajen Prasad; Grant Robertson; David Shearer; Maryan Street; Rino Tirikatene; Phil Twyford; Louisa Wall; Megan Woods	3: Damien O'Connor; Ross Robertson; William Sio	1: Raymond Huo
Green	14: Steffan Browning; David Clendon; Catherine Delahunty; Julie Anne Genter; Kennedy Graham; Kevin Hague; Gareth Hughes; Jan Logie; Mojo Mathers; Russel Norman; Denise Roche; Eugenie Sage; Metiria Turei; Holly Walker	–	–
NZ First	–	8	–
Māori Party	3: Tariana Turia; Pita Sharples; Te Ururoa Flavell	–	–
Mana	1: Hone Harawira	–	–
ACT	1: John Banks	–	–
United Future	1: Peter Dunne	–	–
Total	80	40	1

== Select committee stage ==
The bill was subsequently referred to the Government Administration Select Committee for further consideration and public input. Public submissions for the bill closed on 26 October 2012, with 21,533 written submissions received, not including the six submissions received that were deemed inappropriate or offensive. Of the submissions, 2,898 were unique submissions, while the remaining 18,635 were form submissions. In her submission to the select committee, Bill author Louisa Wall said she believed "hang ups" over homosexuality, especially among older New Zealanders, were behind opposition to the bill. Oral submissions were heard by the committee in Auckland, Wellington and Christchurch from 220 submitters.

The committee reported back on 27 February 2013, the day before the 28 February deadline given, recommending that the bill proceed with amendments. The amendments included:

- the insertion of a second clause in Section 29 of the Marriage Act to clarify that marriage celebrants acting on behalf of an organisation (such as a church) would not be compelled to solemnise marriages against the beliefs of that organisation.
- repealing Section 56 of the Marriage Act, which made it an offence to deny or impugn the validity of a legal marriage. Originally inserted to prevent churches from denying the validity of civil marriages, nobody had ever been prosecuted under the section (the fine of which was stated as £100, despite New Zealand decimalising its currency in 1967) and it had been largely superseded by the New Zealand Bill of Rights Act and Human Rights Act.
- the delay of the commencement of the bill from the day after Royal Assent to four months after Royal Assent to allow the Department of Internal Affairs (who manages births, deaths and marriages in New Zealand) time to implement necessary changes before issuing the first marriage licences. This also allowed time for civil union celebrants who are not already marriage-certified to become so before the first marriages take place.
- Consequential amendments to fourteen other acts and one Regulation. All but one amendment modified context-critical gendered expression (e.g. "husband and wife") to be inclusive of same-sex couples. The single other amendment was to repeal section 30(2) of the Births, Deaths, Marriages and Relationships Registration Act 1995, which prevented birth registrars changing someone's legal gender if the person in question was married – the introduction of same-sex marriage meant this section was no longer needed.

== Second reading ==
The second reading of the bill in Parliament took place on 13 March 2013. During the debate, New Zealand First leader Winston Peters moved that the second reading motion (That the Marriage (Definition of Marriage) Amendment Bill be read a second time) be amended to read That a referendum be held at the time of the next general election to decide whether the Marriage Act 1955 should be amended to recognise marriage between 2 people, regardless of their sex, sexual orientation, or gender identity. The proposed amendment to the motion (Supplementary Order Paper 182) was defeated 83 votes opposed to 33 votes in favour.

As is procedure, Members of Parliament first voted on whether the select committee amendments be accepted before proceeding to the second reading vote. The amendments were agreed to, 66 votes in favour to 21 opposed.

The bill passed its second reading, 77 votes in favour to 44 opposed. Four National MPs who voted in support of the bill at the first reading voted in opposition at the second reading, while the sole abstention from the first reading voted in support of the bill.

Marriage (Definition of Marriage) Amendment Bill – Second Reading
Party	Votes for	Votes against
National (59)	26: Amy Adams; Chris Auchinvole; Maggie Barry; Paula Bennett; Jackie Blue; Cam Calder; David Carter; Judith Collins; Jacqui Dean; Craig Foss; Aaron Gilmore; Paul Goldsmith; Jo Goodhew; Tim Groser; Tau Henare; Paul Hutchison; Steven Joyce; Nikki Kaye; John Key; Hekia Parata; Jami-Lee Ross; Scott Simpson; Chris Tremain; Nicky Wagner; Kate Wilkinson; Maurice Williamson	33: Shane Ardern; Kanwaljit Singh Bakshi; David Bennett; Chester Borrows; Simon Bridges; Gerry Brownlee; Jonathan Coleman; Bill English; Chris Finlayson; Nathan Guy; John Hayes; Phil Heatley; Colin King; Melissa Lee; Sam Lotu-Iiga; Tim Macindoe; Todd McClay; Murray McCully; Ian McKelvie; Mark Mitchell; Alfred Ngaro; Simon O'Connor; Eric Roy; Tony Ryall; Mike Sabin; Katrina Shanks; Nick Smith; Lindsay Tisch; Anne Tolley; Louise Upston; Michael Woodhouse; Jian Yang; Jonathan Young
Labour (34)	31: Jacinda Ardern; Carol Beaumont; David Clark; Clayton Cosgrove; David Cunliffe; Clare Curran; Lianne Dalziel; Ruth Dyson; Kris Faafoi; Darien Fenton; Phil Goff; Chris Hipkins; Parekura Horomia; Raymond Huo; Shane Jones; Annette King; Iain Lees-Galloway; Andrew Little; Moana Mackey; Nanaia Mahuta; Trevor Mallard; Sue Moroney; David Parker; Rajen Prasad; Grant Robertson; David Shearer; Maryan Street; Rino Tirikatene; Phil Twyford; Louisa Wall; Megan Woods	3: Damien O'Connor; Ross Robertson; William Sio
Green (14)	14: Steffan Browning; David Clendon; Catherine Delahunty; Julie Anne Genter; Kennedy Graham; Kevin Hague; Gareth Hughes; Jan Logie; Mojo Mathers; Russel Norman; Denise Roche; Eugenie Sage; Metiria Turei; Holly Walker	–
NZ First (7)	–	7: Asenati Lole-Taylor; Tracey Martin; Winston Peters; Richard Prosser; Barbara Stewart; Andrew Williams; Denis O'Rourke
Māori Party (3)	3: Pita Sharples; Te Ururoa Flavell; Tariana Turia	–
Mana (1)	1: Hone Harawira	–
ACT (1)	1: John Banks	–
United Future (1)	1: Peter Dunne	–
Independent (1)	–	1: Brendan Horan
Total	77	44

== Committee of the Whole House ==
The Committee of the Whole House, where members of parliament debate and vote on the bill clause-by-clause and propose amendments, took place on 27 March 2013.

New Zealand First leader Winston Peters and independent MP Brendan Horan introduced two supplementary order papers (SOPs), numbers 187 and 188 which seek to amend the legislation in question and arrange for a binding referendum on the question. These were replicas of two earlier SOPs, numbers 182 and 183, which were debated and defeated during the second reading. On the day of the vote, conservative Labour MP William Sio moved SOP 202, which sought to uphold the right of individual celebrants to refuse to preside over same-sex weddings, while National MP Tim Macindoe sought to introduce SOP 203, which would widen the 'right to discriminate' on the basis of service provision to conservative Christian caterers, bakers, wedding photographers, public registrars and others engaged in secular occupations who objected to same-sex marriage.

The first two amendments were declared as out of order under Standing Order 298(1); (Note: Standing Order 298(1) states "A committee of the whole House considers a bill to determine whether the bill properly incorporates the principles or objects of the bill as read a second time by the House". In other words, the Committee could not accept the amendments as they were against what the House voted for at the Second Reading (i.e. turning down a referendum on the issue).) the other two were voted down by the House (SOP 202 by 22 votes to 88, SOP 203 by 36 votes to 80). The bill passed the committee stage 77 votes to 43 – the same as the second reading with the exception that Gerry Brownlee (National) did not vote and could not cast a proxy vote.

== Third reading ==
External videos
- Marriage (Definition of Marriage) Amendment Bill -- Third Reading vote announcement and celebration In The House NZ via YouTube
- Marriage (Definition of Marriage) Amendment Bill -- Maurice Williamson's "big gay rainbow" speech Television New Zealand via YouTube

The third and final reading took place on the evening of 17 April 2013. The day before, it was reported that Parliament's public gallery had been completely booked out for the reading. Initial requests to open the Grand Hall immediately outside the debating chamber to cater for the overflow were declined by the Speaker, leaving potentially over 1000 supporters and opponents to overflow onto the Parliament grounds in forecast rain, but later it was decided to open the Legislative Council Chamber with a video link to cater for an extra 200 people.

The bill passed its third reading, 77 votes in favour to 44 votes opposed – the same as the second reading. The only MPs changing their votes were David Bennett (National, Hamilton East) who opposed the first two readings but voted for the third and final reading; and Rino Tirikatene (Labour, Te Tai Tonga) who support the first two readings but not the final one. Despite being one of six openly gay MPs himself, Attorney-General Chris Finlayson voted against the bill, declaring his opposition to state involvement in the institution of marriage as the reason.

After presiding Speaker Lindsay Tisch read out the result of the vote, the public gallery broke into singing "Pokarekare Ana", a Māori love song (waiata), later being joined by some MPs on the floor.

Louisa Wall described the vote as a "World Cup final", and thanked supporters.

During the third reading debate, Building and Construction Minister Maurice Williamson (National, Pakuranga) took a five-minute call and gave a jovial speech, pointing out logical fallacies in some of the more aggressive statements by opponents – the last of which he disproved that the bill was cause of the recent drought conditions affecting New Zealand, by pointing out that it was raining in his electorate that morning, complete with a "big gay rainbow". The speech became a YouTube hit, and was viewed hundreds of thousands of times over the next few days, featuring on high-profile news sites like The Huffington Post and Gawker. The New York Times also picked up the story, incorrectly stating that Williamson was "one of New Zealand's only openly gay MPs" (he is actually heterosexual, and married with three adopted children). Williamson said he also received an expenses-paid offer to go on The Ellen DeGeneres Show, but he turned it down due to scheduling conflicts.

Map showing how each respective electorate MP voted in the third reading of the bill.

Marriage (Definition of Marriage) Amendment Bill – Third Reading
Party	Votes for	Votes against
National (59)	27: Amy Adams; Chris Auchinvole; Maggie Barry; David Bennett; Paula Bennett; Jackie Blue; Cam Calder; David Carter; Judith Collins; Jacqui Dean; Craig Foss; Aaron Gilmore; Paul Goldsmith; Jo Goodhew; Tim Groser; Tau Henare; Paul Hutchison; Steven Joyce; Nikki Kaye; John Key; Hekia Parata; Jami-Lee Ross; Scott Simpson; Chris Tremain; Nicky Wagner; Kate Wilkinson; Maurice Williamson	32: Shane Ardern; Kanwaljit Singh Bakshi; Chester Borrows; Simon Bridges; Gerry Brownlee; Jonathan Coleman; Bill English; Chris Finlayson; Nathan Guy; John Hayes; Phil Heatley; Colin King; Melissa Lee; Sam Lotu-Iiga; Tim Macindoe; Todd McClay; Murray McCully; Ian McKelvie; Mark Mitchell; Alfred Ngaro; Simon O'Connor; Eric Roy; Tony Ryall; Mike Sabin; Katrina Shanks; Nick Smith; Lindsay Tisch; Anne Tolley; Louise Upston; Michael Woodhouse; Jian Yang; Jonathan Young
Labour (34)	30: Jacinda Ardern; Carol Beaumont; David Clark; Clayton Cosgrove; David Cunliffe; Clare Curran; Lianne Dalziel; Ruth Dyson; Kris Faafoi; Darien Fenton; Phil Goff; Chris Hipkins; Parekura Horomia; Raymond Huo; Shane Jones; Annette King; Iain Lees-Galloway; Andrew Little; Moana Mackey; Nanaia Mahuta; Trevor Mallard; Sue Moroney; David Parker; Rajen Prasad; Grant Robertson; David Shearer; Maryan Street; Phil Twyford; Louisa Wall; Megan Woods	4: Damien O'Connor; Ross Robertson; Rino Tirikatene; William Sio
Green (14)	14: Steffan Browning; David Clendon; Catherine Delahunty; Julie Anne Genter; Kennedy Graham; Kevin Hague; Gareth Hughes; Jan Logie; Mojo Mathers; Russel Norman; Denise Roche; Eugenie Sage; Metiria Turei; Holly Walker	–
NZ First (7)	–	7: Asenati Lole-Taylor; Tracey Martin; Winston Peters; Richard Prosser; Barbara Stewart; Andrew Williams; Denis O'Rourke
Māori Party (3)	3: Pita Sharples; Te Ururoa Flavell; Tariana Turia	–
Mana (1)	1: Hone Harawira	–
ACT (1)	1: John Banks	–
United Future (1)	1: Peter Dunne	–
Independent (1)	–	1: Brendan Horan
Total	77	44

== Royal Assent and commencement ==
The bill received the Royal Assent from the Governor-General, Sir Jerry Mateparae, on 19 April 2013 and became an official Act of Parliament, the Marriage (Definition of Marriage) Amendment Act 2013 (2013 No 20).

The law took effect on 19 August 2013. The Department of Internal Affairs released new application forms for marriages on 12 August 2013, with the added field for each partner's sex, and the option of being listed on the marriage licence and certificate as 'bride', 'bridegroom' or 'partner'. To take into account the three-day stand-down period between the time the marriage licence is applied for and the actual licence being issued, registrars started accepting marriage licence applications on 16 August, allowing licences to be issued and marriages to go ahead on 19 August. Registrars received 31 applications from same-sex couples wishing to marry on 19 August.

Overseas-registered same-sex marriages are also legally recognised in New Zealand since 19 August 2013, as long as one of the spouses is a citizen of New Zealand, another Commonwealth country or the Republic of Ireland (as with opposite-sex marriages, if neither spouse is a citizen of one of those countries, they must apply to the Family Court to have their marriage fully recognised in New Zealand).

== See also ==
- Marriage in New Zealand
- LGBT rights in New Zealand
