= Ida Malosi =

New Zealand judge

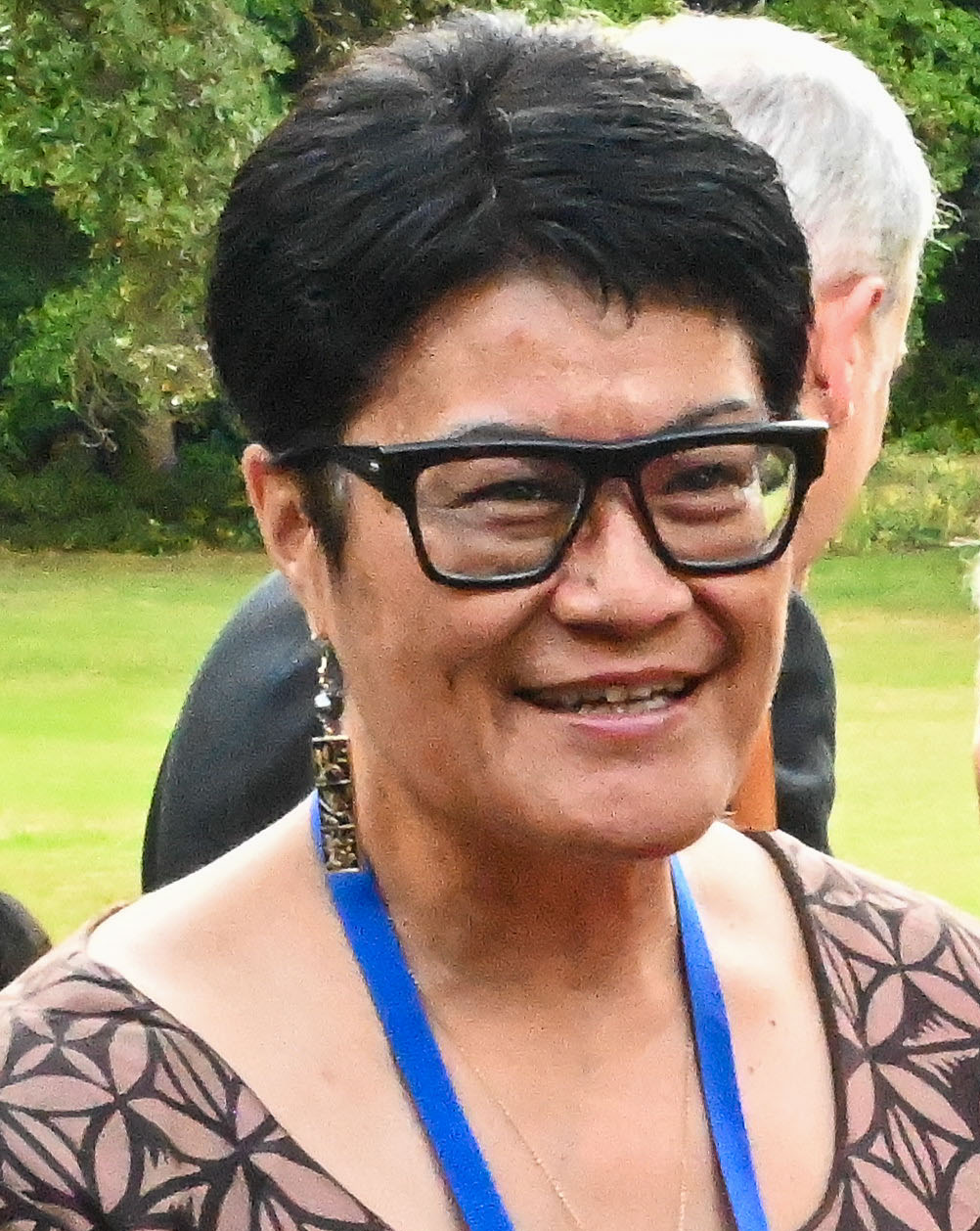
- Malosi in 2025
- Born: Bluff, New Zealand
- Occupation: Lawyer

Ida Malosi is a lawyer and judge from New Zealand. She is the country's first woman Pacific Island judge.

== Early life and education ==
Ida Malosi was raised in Bluff and Invercargill in the South Island of New Zealand. Her parents were immigrants from Samoa; her father, Tusi, worked on wharves and her mother, Jane, was a hospital cleaner.

Malosi earned a Bachelor of Laws degree and a Bachelor of Arts in History from Victoria University of Wellington.

== Career ==
In 1994, together with La-Verne King and Aliʻimuamua Sandra Alofivae, Malosi founded a law firm in South Auckland, a partnership of three Maori and Pacific Island women lawyers.

In 2002, Malosi was appointed as a judge to the Family Court, making her the first woman Pacific Island judge. Since then, she has worked to implement culturally appropriate responses to youth offending, working with Māori Youth Court colleagues on establishing Rangatahi Courts and using this as a model for similar Pasifika Courts. In 2015, the Australasian Institute of Judicial Administration awarded the Rangatahi and Pasifika Courts its Award for Excellence in Judicial Administration.

From May 2013 to July 2014 Malosi served as Samoa's first Samoan female Supreme Court Judge. During her time in Samoa she established the Family Court and the Family Violence Court. She also began the work to found the Alcohol and Other Drug Treatment Court.

== Recognition and awards ==
In 2000 the law firm received the Auckland District Law Society’s EEO ‘Most Innovative’ award.

In 2017 Malosi was awarded Victoria University's Distinguished Alumni Award.
