= Rajen Prasad =

New Zealand politician

Rajen Prasad QSO
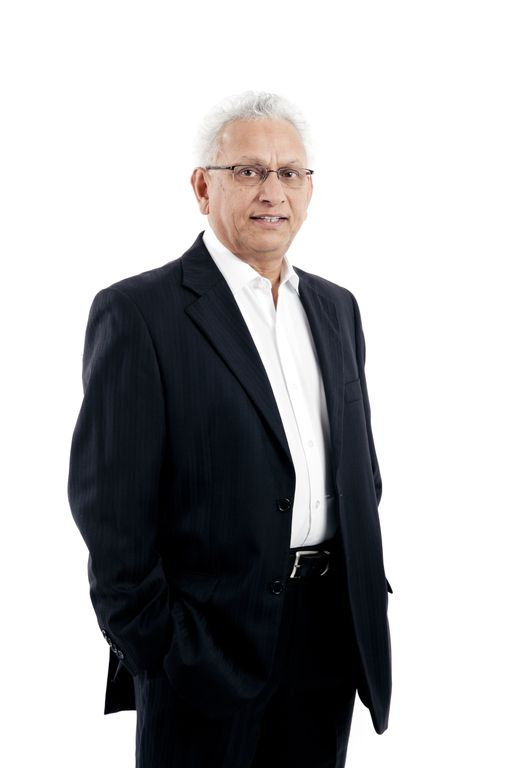

Member of the New Zealand Parliament for Labour Party list
- In office 2008–2014

Personal details
- Born: 1947 (age 78–79) Suva, Fiji
- Party: Labour
- Children: 2
- Profession: Social worker, academic

Rajen Prasad QSO (born 1947) is a New Zealand academic and politician. He was a member of the House of Representatives for the Labour Party from 2008 to 2014.

== Early life and education ==
Prasad was born in Suva, Fiji in 1947 and is of Indo-Fijian descent. His paternal grandparents were migrated from India to Fiji as indentured laborers where they became tobacco farmers. His father was a transport operator. The eleventh of fourteen children, he grew up trilingual speaking English, Hindi and Fijian.

Prasad moved to Auckland, New Zealand as a teenager, recalling his arrival date of 21 April 1964 in his parliamentary maiden speech. New Zealand was not particularly multicultural then, and Prasad said that he and his family were affected by racism and discrimination, like not being able to find rental accommodation. As a young man, he briefly went by the name "Harry," believing that his first name was too difficult for New Zealanders to pronounce, before reverting.

He was taught by the Marist Brothers in Fiji and completed secondary education in New Zealand at Seddon Memorial High School (now Western Springs College). He studied education and anthropology at the University of Auckland and trained as a social worker at Victoria University of Wellington. In 1979 he was appointed to a post at Massey University, and completed his PhD on foster care worker training in 1986.

Prasad and his wife Prem, a primary school teacher, have two children.

== Career ==
Prasad was a social worker before becoming a Massey University associate professor and director of the social work and social policy programme. He led the university's Albany campus during its establishment in 1993.

He was Race Relations Conciliator between 1996 and 2001. Prasad came into the race relations office at a period of heightened tension; his predecessor John Clarke had relocated the office from Auckland to Wellington and a parliamentary select committee found that public perception was Clarke had given priority to Māori complaints over other ethnic groups. Prasad's view was that, although he "strongly supported" the Treaty of Waitangi, the Human Rights Act did not tell the race relations office to prioritise Māori; the Māori affairs minister Tau Henare criticised his approach (promoting multiculturalism) as "undermining" to Māori.

Midway through his term, Prasad reported to Parliament that the number of complaints to his office had risen and that he was concerned about talkback radio hosts, cartoons, and letters to the editor that took "a racial slant" or encouraged the ridiculing of other cultures "under the guise of freedom of speech." He further reported that increasing numbers of Pacific Island and Asian migrants coincided with the rising visibility of fascist groups. However, visiting counterparts from the United Kingdom and Australia said New Zealand was ahead of other nations on race relations.

In 2000, Prasad issued a special report into police racism and historic racism toward Māori in Taranaki, following a shooting. His criticism of health legislation proposed by the new Labour-led government for appearing to give "special treatment" to Māori led to an apparent rift between him and the government. When his five-year term ended, Prasad said he was disappointed in the level of government funding and support his office had received. In May 2001, government minister Margaret Wilson confirmed previously reported plans to consolidate the race relations office with the Human Rights Commission, which were implemented later that year. Prasad returned to academia at Massey University. He was also appointed a member of the Residence Appeal Authority, which made decisions about appeals brought under the Immigration Act.

In June 2004 Prasad was appointed as the first Chief Commissioner of the newly established Families Commission, serving until 2008. He accompanied the prime minister, Helen Clark, on a diplomatic visit to India in 2004. Prasad was criticised for approving a confidential payout to the outgoing chief executive of the Families Commission without informing the government, for which he apologised. As the chief commissioner, he publicly supported the repeal of the legal defence allowing parents to use reasonable force to punish their children and for increased paid parental leave. At his retirement from the Commission in 2008, he was rumoured to be in line to stand for Labour in that year's election.

He joined the board of the Bank of Baroda's New Zealand office in 2008 and became the board chair in 2013. He remained a director of the Bank until 2016.

== Member of Parliament ==
New Zealand Parliament
Years	Term	Electorate	List	Party
2008–2011	49th	List	12	Labour
2011–2014	50th	List	20	Labour

Prasad was a list-only candidate for the Labour Party on two occasions. At the 2008 election Prasad was ranked 12, the highest-placed new candidate, and was subsequently elected to Parliament. In the 2011 election, Prasad was re-elected, albeit at a lower list placing of 20. He had sought the party's nomination to stand in Te Atatu in 2011, but was unsuccessful.

Prasad sat on the social services committee throughout his two terms as a member of Parliament. He was Labour's spokesperson on the voluntary and community sector (2008–11), ethnic affairs (2011–13) and immigration (2013–14) and an associate spokesperson on ethnic affairs (2008–11, 2013–14) and social development (2008–14). He was believed to have supported David Cunliffe in the 2011 and 2013 Labour Party leadership contests.

As a member of Parliament, he argued against the National Government's reforms to the Families Commission, which he described as cynical, voted against appointing an anti-abortion doctor to the Abortion Supervisory Committee, voted in favour of legalising same-sex marriage, and said he would not vote in the 2009 New Zealand child discipline referendum. He was also an advocate for ethnic communities and immigrants. However, Prasad was seen by media as being ineffectual and unlikely to be appointed to a ministerial office if Labour were to win an election. For each of the three years from 2011 to 2013, political newsletter Trans Tasman rated his performance 1/10; a November 2013 Dominion Post editorial suggested that he be told not to run again; The New Zealand Herald reported he only issued a single press release that year.

In May 2014, Prasad announced his plans to retire ahead of the general election in September 2014. In his valedictory speech, given on 24 July, he commented on the limitations on the effectiveness and perceptions of ethnic MPs in the "largely monocultural" New Zealand Parliament:

It is noteworthy that all the ethnic MPs in this Parliament are backbenchers with fairly low conventional profiles. Those who report on us and judge us are never present where we do the bulk of our work, and all they rely on is what is in the mainstream media or this House. I say this not with any acrimony towards those who make these judgments, but more with a sense of sadness.

After leaving Parliament, Prasad was appointed a Commonwealth Envoy with special responsibility for Lesotho working directly in Africa to help develop better political practices.

== Honours ==
In the 2003 New Year Honours, Prasad was appointed a Companion of the Queen's Service Order for public services.
