= 1923 Speaker of the New Zealand House of Representatives election =

- 7 February 1923
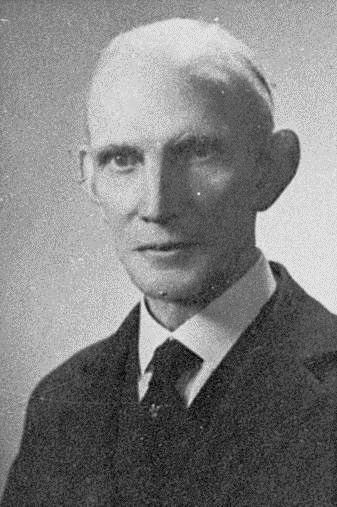

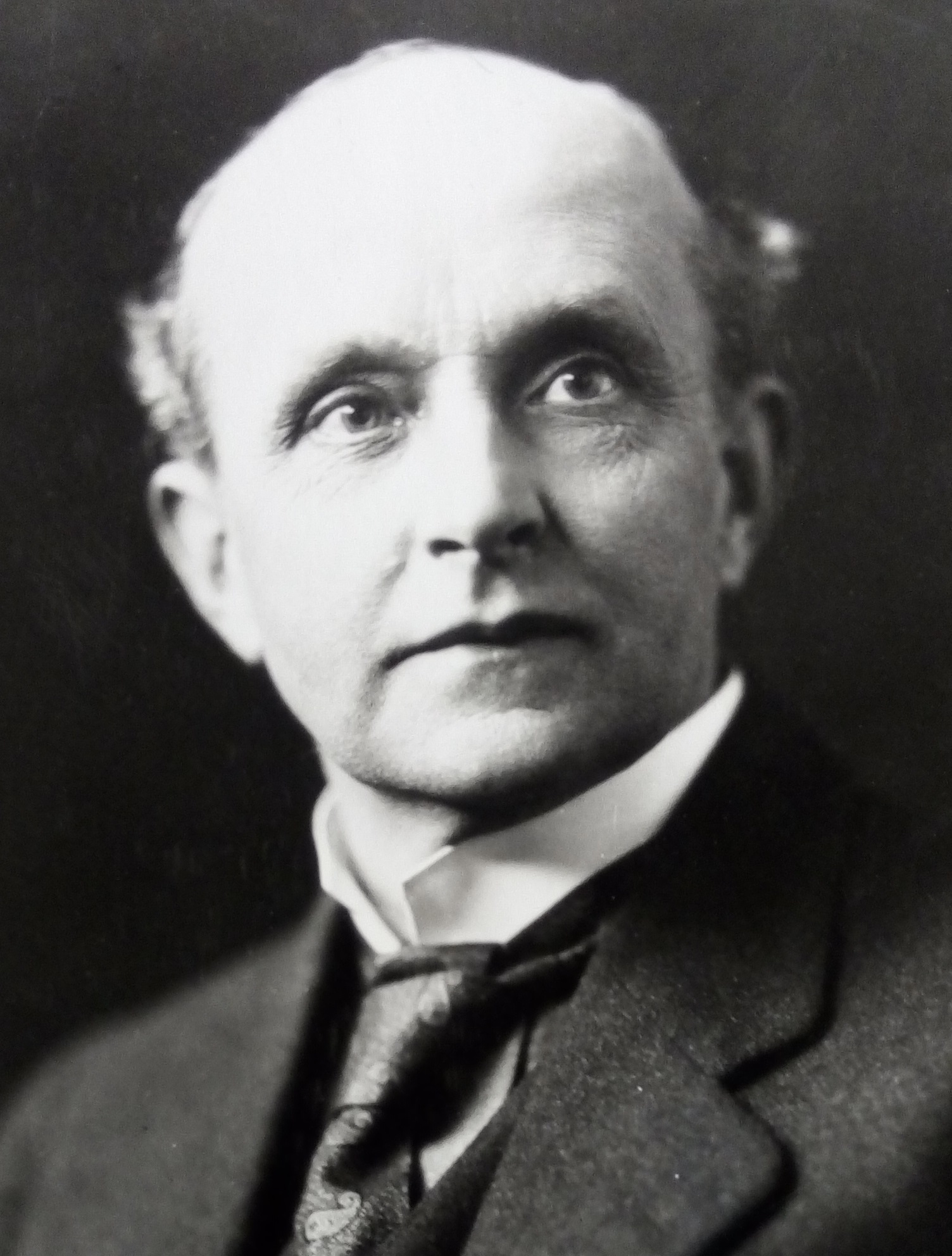
Candidate	Charles Statham	James McCombs
Party	Independent	Labour
Popular vote	61	17
Percentage	78.20	21.79
Speaker before election
Sir Frederic Lang
Reform
Elected Speaker
Charles Statham
Independent

The 1923 election of the Speaker of the New Zealand House of Representatives occurred on 7 February 1923, following the 1922 general election result. The election saw the incumbent speaker Sir Frederic Lang lose his parliamentary seat. It resulted in the election of Independent MP Charles Statham as Speaker.

== Nominated candidates ==
Two candidates were nominated:

- James McCombs, MP for Lyttelton – Labour Party
- Charles Statham, MP for Dunedin Central – Independent

John Luke, the MP for Wellington North, declined nomination for the role of speaker.

== Election ==
The election was conducted by means of a conventional parliamentary motion. The Clerk of the House of Representatives conducted a vote on the question of the election of the Speaker.

The following table gives the election results:

Party	Candidate	Votes	%
Independent	Charles Statham	61	78.20
Labour	James McCombs	17	21.79
Majority		44	56.41
Turnout		78	—N/a

How each MP voted:

Party	Name	Speaker Vote
Reform	George James Anderson	Statham
Labour	Tim Armstrong	McCombs
Independent	Harry Atmore	Statham
Labour	Fred Bartram	McCombs
Independent	Allen Bell	Statham
Reform	John Bitchener	Statham
Reform	Richard Bollard	Statham
Liberal	David Buddo	Statham
Reform	Thomas Burnett	Statham
Reform	Gordon Coates	Statham
Liberal	James Randall Corrigan	Statham
Liberal	Philip De La Perrelle	Statham
Reform	James Dickson	Statham
Reform	James Samuel Dickson	Statham
Reform	William Downie Stewart Jr	Statham
Liberal	John Edie	Statham
Reform	Billy Glenn	Statham
Reform	William Hughes Field	Statham
Liberal	George Forbes	Statham
Labour	Peter Fraser	McCombs
Reform	William Girling	Statham
Reform	David Guthrie	Statham
Liberal	Josiah Hanan	Statham
Reform	Alexander Harris	Statham
Reform	Oswald Hawken	Statham
Reform	Taurekareka Henare	Statham
Reform	William Herries	Statham
Reform	Frank Hockly	Statham
Labour	Harry Holland	McCombs
Liberal	James Horn	Statham
Labour	Ted Howard	McCombs
Reform	Richard Hudson	Statham
Reform	George Hunter	Statham
Liberal	Leonard Isitt	Statham
Labour	Bill Jordan	McCombs
Labour	Frank Langstone	McCombs
Labour	John A. Lee	McCombs
Reform	Joseph Linklater	Statham
Reform	John Luke	Statham
Liberal	Frederick Lye	Statham
Reform	Douglas Lysnar	Statham
Liberal	Jack MacPherson	Statham
Reform	William Massey	Statham
Liberal	Robert Masters	Statham
Labour	Lew McIlvride	McCombs
Liberal	Gilbert McKay	Statham
Labour	Robert McKeen	McCombs
Reform	Alex McLeod	Statham
Labour	Alec Monteith	McCombs
Labour	Jim Munro	McCombs
Independent Liberal	Alfred Murdoch	Statham
Reform	William Nosworthy	Statham
Reform	Jimmy Nash	Statham
Liberal	Āpirana Ngata	Statham
Labour	James O'Brien	McCombs
Reform	James Parr	Statham
Labour	Bill Parry	McCombs
Independent Liberal	Hugh Poland	McCombs
Reform	Māui Pōmare	Statham
Reform	Vivian Potter	Statham
Liberal	Alfred Ransom	Statham
Reform	Heaton Rhodes	Statham
Reform	Thomas William Rhodes	Statham
Reform	Frank Rolleston	Statham
Reform	John Rolleston	Statham
Labour	Michael Joseph Savage	McCombs
Liberal	Thomas Sidey	Statham
Liberal	Sydney George Smith	Statham
Labour	Dan Sullivan	McCombs
Independent	George Sykes	Statham
Liberal	John Charles Thomson	Statham
Reform	Henare Uru	Statham
Liberal	Bill Veitch	Statham
Liberal	Thomas Wilford	Statham
Reform	Kenneth Williams	Statham
Independent Liberal	George Witty	Statham
Reform	Robert Wright	Statham
Reform	Alexander Young	Statham
