= Aliʻimuamua Sandra Alofivae =

New Zealand barrister

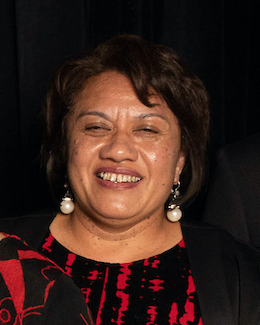
Alofivae in 2018

Aliʻimuamua Sandra Alofivae MNZM (born c. 1967) is a New Zealand barrister.

== Career ==
Alofivae set up a legal practice, King Alofivae Malosi, in 1994 with colleagues La-Verne King and Ida Malosi, and became a barrister sole in 2005. She has represented children and their families and her practice become one of the biggest child protection practices in South Auckland. She served as a Families Commissioner for six months and her work in this role influenced the 2014 Vulnerable Children's Act. Alofivae was also elected to the Counties Manukau District Health Board in December 2010. She served two terms on the board, but did not stand again in the 2016 elections. Alofivae has been the chair of the South Auckland Social Well-Being Board, which works with the government on issues facing pre-school children.

In 2018, Alofivae was appointed to a Royal Commission of Inquiry, commissioned by the New Zealand government, to investigate abuse and neglect of people in state care and in faith-based institutions. This commission is scheduled to produce two reports: one in 2020 and one in 2023.

In April 2019 the Commission did not answer questions on whether Alofivae, who is Presbyterian, had a conflict of interest. Her subsequent conflict of interest management plan provided that she would not sit on any hearings relating to the Presbyterian Church,

== Honours and awards ==
In the 2016 Queen's Birthday Honours, Alofivae was appointed a Member of the New Zealand Order of Merit, for services to the Pacific community and youth. In 2018 she received a Blake Leader Award, presented by the Sir Peter Blake Trust. She also has an honorific title bestowed to her by her family in the village of Sa'anapu, Samoa.

== Personal life ==
Alofivae grew up in Māngere, Auckland. Her father died when she was one year old. She attended Epsom Girls' Grammar School, describing it as "a very white school" and saying "I didn’t experience any real racism until I started high school." She is a mother of four and is a Presbyterian.
