= Damon Salesa =

Samoan New Zealand academic (born 1972)

Damon Salesa FRSNZ
- Toeolesulusulu Ieremia Salesa

3rd Vice-Chancellor of Auckland University of Technology
- Incumbent
- Assumed office 1 April 2022
- Chancellor: Rob Campbell
- Preceded by: Derek McCormack

Personal details
- Born: Damon Ieremia Salesa; 30 December 1972 (age 53)
- Spouse: Jenny Salesa

Academic background
- Education: University of Auckland (MA); Oriel College, Oxford (PhD)
- Theses: "Troublesome half-castes" : tales of a Samoan borderland (1997); Race mixing: a Victorian problem in Britain and New Zealand, 1830s–1870 (2001)

Academic work
- Discipline: Pacific History
- Institutions: University of Michigan; University of Auckland; Auckland University of Technology

Damon Ieremia Salesa (born 30 December 1972) is a New Zealand academic. Of Samoan descent, he is the first Pacific person to hold the position of vice-chancellor at a New Zealand university.

== Education ==
Raised in Glen Innes, Salesa attended Selwyn College and then the University of Auckland. He graduated Master of Arts in 1997 with a thesis entitled "Troublesome half-castes" : tales of a Samoan borderland. Salesa was the first Rhodes Scholar of Pacific descent, obtaining his PhD from the University of Oxford. The title of his doctoral thesis was Race mixing: a Victorian problem in Britain and New Zealand, 1830s–1870.

== Academic career ==
He was an associate professor of history at the University of Michigan, before returning to Auckland where he was co-head of Te Wānanga o Waipapa (School of Māori Studies and Pacific Studies) and pro vice-chancellor (Pacific) at the University of Auckland.

In 2017, Salesa attracted significant press both with claims that Auckland has "residential segregation", and that Pacific Island sports stars are denied governance roles.

In November 2021, Salesa was appointed as Vice-Chancellor of Auckland University of Technology (AUT). In late October 2022, Salesa confirmed that AUT was proceeding with plans to make 250 full-time staff including 170 academic staff redundant. In justifying the redundancies, Salesa cited rising salary costs, declining government funding, and a projected decline in the number of student enrolments for 2023. In response, the Tertiary Education Union announced that it would take legal action against AUT in an attempt to halt the 170 academic staff redundancies. In early January 2023, the Employment Relations Authority (ERA) ruled that AUT had violated its collective employment agreement with academic staff and ordered the University to rescind the 170 severance notices it had issued in December 2022.

== Awards ==
In 2021, Salesa was elected a Fellow of the Royal Society Te Apārangi, in recognition of "his outstanding interdisciplinary contribution to Pacific Studies".

He won the General non-fiction award at the 2024 Ockham New Zealand Book Awards for An Indigenous Ocean.

In 2023, he was elected an Honorary Fellow of Oriel College, Oxford.

== Personal life ==
Salesa is married to Jenny Salesa, a lawyer and member of the New Zealand parliament for the Labour Party. They have two children.

== Selected works ==
- Racial Crossings: Race, Intermarriage, and the Victorian British Empire. 2012. ISBN 978-0-19-960415-9. (Won the Ernest Scott Prize for History.)
- Island time : New Zealand's Pacific futures. 2017. ISBN 978-1-98-853353-7
- An Indigenous Ocean: Pacific essays. 2023. ISBN 978-1-99-1033-60-4
