= Asenati Taylor =

New Zealand politician

Le'Aufa'amulia Asenati Lole-Taylor
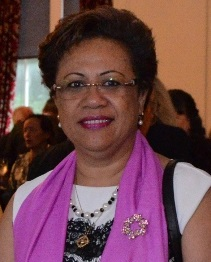

Member of the New Zealand Parliament for New Zealand First party list
- In office 26 November 2011 – 20 September 2014

Personal details
- Born: Asenati Lole; 1962 or 1963 (age 62–63) Apia, Samoa
- Party: New Zealand First
- Spouse: Dennis Taylor
- Children: 3
- Profession: Administrator

Le'Aufa'amulia Asenati Lole-Taylor (born 1962 or 1963) is a former New Zealand politician. She was a member of the House of Representatives for the New Zealand First party from 2011 to 2014.

== Early life ==
Born in Samoa, Taylor emigrated to New Zealand at the age of 17. She served as chairperson of the Auckland City Pacific Islands Board and as a member of the Pacific Health Advisory Committee of the Auckland District Health Board. Prior to election to Parliament, Taylor worked as the Regional Advisor Pacific Northern Region for Rehabilitation and Reintegration Services at the Department of Corrections.

She has three children and one stepson. She holds the chiefly title Le'Aufa'amulia from the Samoan village of Falese'ela.

== Political career ==
New Zealand Parliament
Years	Term	Electorate	List	Party
2011–2014	50th	List	8	NZ First

Taylor ran for office on three occasions under the name Asenati Lole-Taylor. In 2007, she was an unsuccessful New Zealand Labour Party candidate in the Tamaki-Maungakiekie Ward in the Auckland City Council elections.

By the following year she had changed parties to New Zealand First. She contested the 2008 election in the Maungakiekie electorate, and was placed seventh on the party list, but the party won no seats. For the 2011 election she contested Manukau East and elected as the eighth-ranked candidate on the party list.

As a member of parliament, Taylor was a member of the law and order committee until March 2012 and thereafter sat on the social services committee. From March 2012 until the end of her term she was the New Zealand First party spokesperson on corrections, ethnic affairs, Pacific Island affairs and social welfare, and the associate spokesperson on housing. A member's bill in Taylor's name, the Sentencing (Protection of Children from Criminal Offending) Amendment Bill, passed its first reading in September 2013 and was defeated in December 2014.

In 2013, Taylor voted against the Marriage Amendment Bill, which aimed to permit same sex marriage in New Zealand, with all of her fellow New Zealand First MPs.

After being demoted to the sixteenth position on the New Zealand First party list, Lole-Taylor failed to return to Parliament at the 2014 general election.

== After Parliament ==
Following her demotion and subsequent failure to get re-elect Taylor has kept a low profile. Taylor came to prominence when it was found both she and her husband, Dennis Taylor, had illicitly accessed private data during their time working for the Department of Corrections. The access was found to be in regards to an elected official of the New Zealand First Party. Records pertaining to drink driving offences committed by Marise Bishop, a former director on New Zealand First's board and Mana electorate chairwoman, were accessed from Corrections. Bishop believed Dennis Taylor's motivation was down to his wife's loyalty to fellow Samoan New Zealand First member Tim Manu who was active in the Mana electorate but with whom Bishop had fallen out with. Following the release of this information Taylor hinted she was contemplating a move to Australia and removed most of her social media presence, having been known for outspoken tweets during her time as an MP.

In May 2015 Taylor left New Zealand despite a probe into the activities of her and her husband. They were believed to have left New Zealand in March.
