= Superu =

Government organisation in Wellington, New Zealand

Superu (Social Policy Evaluation and Research Unit)

Agency overview
- Formed: 2003
- Preceding agency: Families Commission
- Dissolved: 2018 (by the Families Commission Act Repeal Act)
- Headquarters: Wellington
- Minister responsible: Minister for Social Development
- Agency executives: Len Cook, Last Families Commissioner; Dr Malcolm Menzies, Last Chief Executive
- Website: www.superu.govt.nz

The Social Policy Research and Evaluation Unit, known as Superu and previously known as the Families Commission, was an autonomous New Zealand Crown entity which undertook social science research and advocated to government on behalf of families. It commenced operating on 1 July 2004 and was disestablished on 30 June 2018.

== Purpose ==
At its establishment, the main function of the Families Commission was to "act as an advocate for the interests of families generally," but not on behalf of particular families in respect of specific issues. It had additional functions related to undertaking investigations on behalf of the government and promoting research into any matter relating to the interests of families.

From 2014, the commission was restructured and rebranded as Superu and given a stronger monitoring, evaluation, and research function. At the point of its disestablishment in 2018, Superu managed:

- an extensive online catalogue of government social science research dating back to 2000;
- the government contract for the Growing Up in New Zealand longitudinal study;
- the government contract for the New Zealand Family Violence Clearinghouse.

== History ==
=== Establishment: Families Commission Act 2003 ===
The creation of the Families Commission was an outcome of post-election political negotiations between the Labour Party and United Future in 2002. Labour had decided to form a confidence and supply agreement with United Future enabling it to continue the Fifth Labour Government into a second term. Establishing a "Commission for the Family" that would be a national research centre, coordinate government departments and facilitate advice for families had been an election pledge for the smaller party. Labour had promoted a similar initiative, called the "parenting council," in its campaign. The agreement between Labour leader Helen Clark and United Future leader Peter Dunne included a commitment to develop proposals for such a commission as an immediate priority with implementation planned for the 2003/04 financial year.

Steve Maharey, as Minister of Social Services and Employment, introduced the Families Commission Bill which was considered by the social services committee after passing its first reading 60–56 on 13 May 2003. The four parties which did not comprise the government—National, New Zealand First, the Greens and ACT—all voted against the legislation. New Zealand First MP Dail Jones described United Future as having "sold out" to Labour and suggested that the draft legislation did not sufficiently advance United Future's policy goals. He later criticised the Bill as doing "nothing to support the traditional standard relationship of a man and a woman with their children." The social services committee was balanced between members who supported the bill and those who did not, and it was not able to report progress on the bill when its time for consideration expired. Despite this, the legislation eventually completed its third reading on 11 December 2003 by a vote of 62–56.

The first round of six appointments to the Families Commission was announced in June 2004, prior to the commission's formal establishment on 1 July. Rajen Prasad, a social worker and academic who had been race relations conciliator from 1996 to 2001, was appointed chief commissioner and continued in that position until 2008 when he became a Labour MP. Sharron Cole, Mason Durie, Sandra Alofivae, Carolynn Bull, and Lyn Campbell filled the other positions. Prasad was criticised in 2005 when he authorised a confidential settlement with the commission's inaugural chief executive.

An attempt by New Zealand First to replace the Families Commission in 2004 failed. Labour and United Future continued their political alliance after the 2005 general election. Their post-election agreement specified that the Families Commission would not be downgraded. At the election, National had pledged to keep the post of families commissioner but reposition the role within the Children's Commissioner. Jan Pryor succeeded Prasad as chief commissioner in August 2008 and held office until her resignation in May 2010.

=== Reform: Families Commission Amendment Act 2014 ===
Reform to the commission was mooted by National Party leader John Key during the 2008 general election but ruled out when National and United Future formed a government together. Bruce Pilcrow and Christine Rankin were appointed as commissioners in May 2009, with Rankin's appointment, and the process for the appointment, being criticised by MPs including United Future leader Peter Dunne and Labour deputy leader Annette King.

In May 2012, after the National government won a second term, social development minister Paula Bennett announced a suite of reforms that had been foreshadowed in the renewed National–United Future agreement. The commission was proposed to renamed as the Social Policy Research and Evaluation Unit (Superu) with a single-commissioner structure, minister-appointed governance board and stronger research function. During the restructure, Sir Wira Gardiner and Parmjeet Parmar were appointed as commissioners. Legislation to enact the changes, the Families Commission Amendment Bill, completed its third reading on 24 March 2014 in a 64–56 vote. Labour's opposition to the changes was led by former chief commissioner Rajen Prasad, by then a member of Parliament. In lieu of what it described as a "compromised" commission, Labour proposed establishing a new Ministry for Children, which had been party policy since 2011. The creation of a child-centred ministry (Oranga Tamariki) was announced by the National government in 2016.

=== Disestablishment: Families Commission Act Repeal Act 2018 ===
Labour followed through on its pledge to disestablish Superu after it formed a new government in 2017, although by this time the previous government had commenced work to consider the disestablishment of the Crown entity. The Families Commission Act Repeal Bill received unanimous support at its third reading on 23 May 2018. The sole post-reform commissioner position, then held by former national statistician Len Cook since 1 July 2015, was disestablished. Superu closed on 30 June 2018 and its surviving functions were reassigned to the Ministry of Social Development, the Ministry of Justice and the Social Wellbeing Agency.

== List of chief commissioners ==
No.	Name	Term of office	
1	Rajen Prasad	1 July 2004	August 2008
2	Jan Pryor	August 2008	March 2010
-	Bruce Pilbrow (acting)	March 2010	1 August 2010
3	Carl Davidson	1 August 2010	1 February 2013
4	Belinda Milnes	1 February 2013 (acting until July 2013)	20 October 2014
-	Jo-ann Wilkinson (interim)	29 October 2014	1 July 2015
5	Len Cook	1 July 2015	30 June 2018
