= Panmure-Ōtāhuhu =

- Single-member general constituency for the New Zealand House of Representatives
- Formation: 2020
- Region: Auckland
- Character: Suburban
- Term: 3 years

Member for Panmure-Ōtāhuhu

Panmure-Ōtāhuhu was an electorate to the New Zealand House of Representatives in south-central Auckland. It was first contested at the 2020 election, and has been held by Jenny Salesa of the Labour Party since its inception. The electorate was abolished ahead of the 2026 general election.

== Population centres ==
It is located in south-central Auckland, along the thinnest section of the Auckland isthmus. The electorate consists of the mid-eastern part of the Manukau ward, and a long strip of suburbs along the west bank of the Tāmaki River. The electorate divided by State Highway 1 and covers the titular suburbs of Panmure and Ōtāhuhu, as well as Tāmaki, Point England, Westfield, Ōtara and Papatoetoe.

== History ==
Panmure-Ōtāhuhu was created in the 2019/20 redistribution, mostly from the former Manukau East, but now including a large portion of the eastern part of the Maungakiekie electorate.

Rapid population growth north of Auckland resulted in a domino effect through Auckland, and in becoming Panmure-Ōtāhuhu, Manukau East was moved northward, losing a triangular area around Puhinui to Manurewa and being extended north to Point England. Initially it was proposed to keep the name of Manukau East, but the name of Panmure-Ōtāhuhu was adopted after a public consultation period.

Manukau East was, since its creation in 1996, a safe Labour seat, held since 2014 by Jenny Salesa. When Salesa contested the new electorate in the 2020 election she won again, holding the seat for Labour.

The electorate was disestablished for the 2026 general election due to population shifts in the Auckland region. The population centres of the electorate would be divided between Otahuhu and Maungakiekie.

=== Members of Parliament ===
Key Labour

| Election | Winner |
|---|---|
| 2020 election | Jenny Salesa |
| 2023 election | Jenny Salesa |
(Electorate abolished in 2026; see Ōtāhuhu)

=== List MPs ===
Members of Parliament elected from party lists in elections where that person also unsuccessfully contested the Panmure-Ōtāhuhu electorate. Unless otherwise stated, all MPs' terms began and ended at general elections.

Key Green

| Election | |
|---|---|
| 2023 election | Efeso Collins (Note: Collins died on 21 February 2024.) |

== Election results ==
=== 2023 ===
2023 general election: Panmure-Ōtāhuhu
| Notes: | Blue background denotes the winner of the electorate vote. Pink background denotes a candidate elected from their party list. Yellow background denotes an electorate win by a list member, or other incumbent. A ✓ or ✗ denotes status of any incumbent, win or lose respectively. | | | | | | |
| Party | Candidate | Votes | % | ±% | Party votes | % | ±% |
|---|---|---|---|---|---|---|---|
| Labour | ✓ Jenny Salesa | 15,358 | 51.56 | –21.94 | 16,024 | 52.15 | –20.37 |
| National | Navtej Randhawa | 7,388 | 24.80 | +11.30 | 8,074 | 26.27 | +13.72 |
| Green | Efeso Collins | 4,312 | 14.47 | +10.07 | 2,601 | 8.46 | +4.40 |
| ACT | Antonia Modkova | 1,238 | 4.15 | – | 1,100 | 3.58 | +1.23 |
| Vision NZ | Karl Mokaraka | 387 | 1.29 | – | | | |
| Workers Now | James Robb | 235 | 0.78 | – | | | |
| NZ First | | | | | 1,001 | 3.26 | +0.82 |
| Te Pāti Māori | | | | | 410 | 1.33 | +0.70 |
| Opportunities | | | | | 369 | 1.20 | +0.46 |
| Freedoms NZ | | | | | 222 | 0.72 | – |
| NewZeal | | | | | 187 | 0.60 | +0.46 |
| Legalise Cannabis | | | | | 133 | 0.43 | 0.00 |
| NZ Loyal | | | | | 124 | 0.40 | – |
| Animal Justice | | | | | 50 | 0.16 | – |
| New Conservatives | | | | | 37 | 0.12 | –1.09 |
| Women's Rights | | | | | 33 | 0.10 | – |
| DemocracyNZ | | | | | 20 | 0.06 | – |
| New Nation | | | | | 13 | 0.04 | – |
| Leighton Baker Party | | | | | 7 | 0.02 | – |
| Informal votes | | 863 | | | 318 | | |
| Total valid votes | | 29,781 | | | 30,723 | | |
| Labour hold | Majority | 7,970 | 26.76 | –33.24 | | | |

=== 2020 ===
2020 general election: Panmure-Ōtāhuhu
| Notes: | Blue background denotes the winner of the electorate vote. Pink background denotes a candidate elected from their party list. Yellow background denotes an electorate win by a list member, or other incumbent. A ✓ or ✗ denotes status of any incumbent, win or lose respectively. | | | | | | |
| Party | Candidate | Votes | % | ±% | Party votes | % | ±% |
|---|---|---|---|---|---|---|---|
| Labour | ✓ Jenny Salesa | 22,818 | 73.50 | — | 22,929 | 72.52 | — |
| National | Kanwaljit Singh Bakshi | 4,192 | 13.50 | — | 3,970 | 12.55 | — |
| Green | Mark Simiona | 1,366 | 4.40 | — | 1,284 | 4.06 | — |
| New Conservative | Ted Johnston | 648 | 2.08 | — | 383 | 1.21 | — |
| Advance NZ | Bryn Jones | 324 | 1.04 | — | 259 | 0.81 | — |
| Outdoors | Phillip Bridge | 210 | 0.67 | — | 33 | 0.10 | — |
| Communist League | Patrick Brown | 81 | 0.26 | — | | | |
| NZ First | | | | | 772 | 2.44 | — |
| ACT | | | | | 744 | 2.35 | — |
| Opportunities | | | | | 234 | 0.74 | — |
| Māori Party | | | | | 202 | 0.63 | — |
| Legalise Cannabis | | | | | 136 | 0.43 | — |
| Vision NZ | | | | | 87 | 0.27 | — |
| ONE | | | | | 45 | 0.14 | — |
| TEA | | | | | 37 | 0.11 | — |
| Sustainable NZ | | | | | 9 | 0.02 | — |
| Heartland | | | | | 4 | 0.01 | — |
| Social Credit | | | | | 2 | 0.01 | — |
| Informal votes | | 1,403 | | | 485 | | |
| Total valid votes | | 31,042 | | | 31,615 | | |
| Labour win new seat | Majority | 18,626 | 60.00 | | | | |
