= Jenny Salesa =

New Zealand politician

The Honourable Jenny Salesa MP
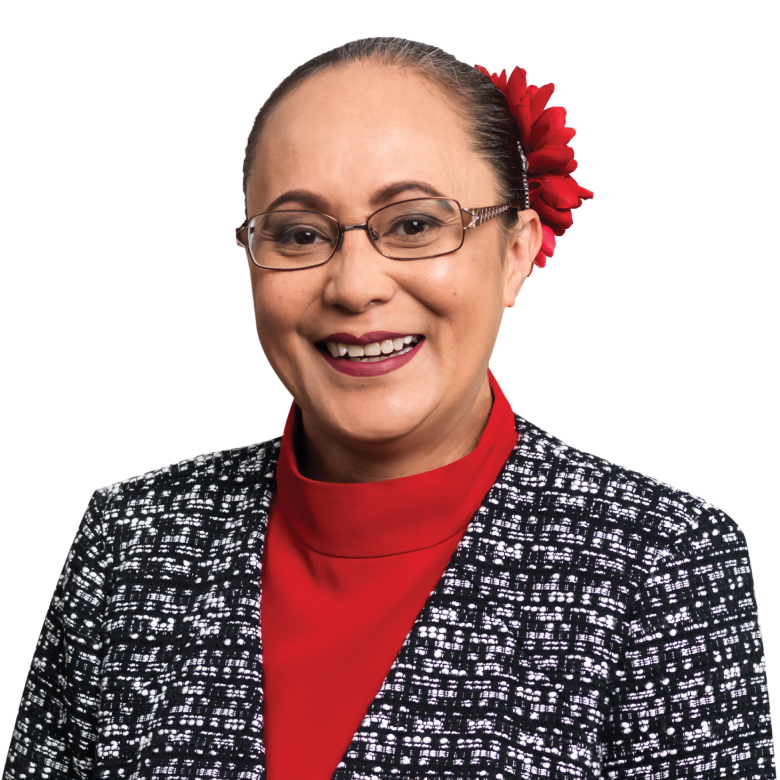
- Salesa in 2023

First Assistant Speaker of the House of Representatives
- In office 26 November 2020 – 6 December 2023
- Speaker: Trevor Mallard (2020–2022); Adrian Rurawhe (2022–2023)
- Preceded by: Ruth Dyson
- Succeeded by: Maureen Pugh

7th Minister for Building and Construction
- In office 26 October 2017 – 6 November 2020
- Prime Minister: Jacinda Ardern
- Preceded by: Nick Smith
- Succeeded by: Poto Williams

Minister for Ethnic Communities
- In office 26 October 2017 – 6 November 2020
- Prime Minister: Jacinda Ardern
- Preceded by: Judith Collins
- Succeeded by: Priyanca Radhakrishnan

65th Minister of Customs
- In office 27 June 2019 – 6 November 2020
- Prime Minister: Jacinda Ardern
- Preceded by: Kris Faafoi
- Succeeded by: Meka Whaitiri

Member of the New Zealand Parliament for Ōtāhuhu Manukau East (2014–2020) Panmure-Ōtāhuhu (2020–2023)
- Incumbent
- Assumed office 20 September 2014
- Preceded by: Ross Robertson
- Majority: 18,626

Personal details
- Born: c. 1968 (age 57–58) Tonga
- Party: Labour
- Spouse: Damon Salesa
- Education: University of Auckland
- Profession: Public servant

Jennifer Teresia Salesa (née Latu, born c. 1968) is a New Zealand politician and member of the Labour Party who has served as a Member of Parliament since 2014. She was first elected as MP for Manukau East, and after its abolition in 2020 won the replacement electorate of Panmure-Ōtāhuhu. She served as a Cabinet Minister in the Sixth Labour Government as Minister for Building and Construction, Minister of Customs (from 2019) and Minister for Ethnic Communities from 2017 until 6 November 2020.

== Early life and career ==
She is of Tongan heritage and is married to university academic Damon Salesa. Prior to entering Parliament Salesa had worked in the public sector, and overseas in the United States.

== Political career ==
New Zealand Parliament
Years	Term	Electorate	List	Party
2014–2017	51st	Manukau East	31	Labour
2017–2020	52nd	Manukau East	19	Labour
2020–2023	53rd	Panmure-Ōtāhuhu	13	Labour
2023–2026	54th	Panmure-Ōtāhuhu	24	Labour
2026–present	55th	Ōtāhuhu	24	Labour

=== In opposition, 2014–2017 ===
Salesa replaced long serving MP Ross Robertson in the Manukau East seat when he retired at the 2014 election. She was successful in gaining the Labour party nomination for the seat, ahead of Auckland Councillor Efeso Collins. Salesa won the seat by a margin of 13,254 votes, beating the National Party candidate Kanwaljit Singh Bakshi.

=== In government, 2017–2023 ===
During the 2017 New Zealand general election held on 23 September, Salesa retained Manukau East by 12,589 votes, beating the National Party candidate Bakshi.

In mid-October 2017, Salesa was elected as a Cabinet Minister by the Labour Party caucus following Labour's formation of a government with New Zealand First and the Greens. She was appointed Minister for Building and Construction and Minister of Ethnic Communities, and Associate Minister of Education, Health, and Housing and Urban Development.

In late June 2019, Salesa was made Minister of Customs following a cabinet reshuffle, replacing Kris Faafoi who assumed the portfolio of Associate Minister for public housing.

During the 2020 New Zealand general election, Salesa contested the Panmure-Ōtāhuhu electorate, defeating National Party candidate Kanwaljit Singh Bakshi by a final margin of 18,626 votes.

When the new Cabinet was announced following the election, Salesa lost all her ministerial positions. She was instead nominated for the role of Assistant Speaker. On 9 November 2020, Salesa was granted retention of the title "The Honourable" for life, in recognition of her term as a member of the Executive Council. She was officially appointed an Assistant Speaker on 26 November.

=== In opposition, 2023–present ===
During the 2023 New Zealand general election, Salesa retained the Panmure-Ōtāhuhu electorate by 7,970 votes, defeating National's candidate Navtej Randhawa.

In late November 2023, Salesa became spokesperson for ethnic communities and customs in the Shadow Cabinet of Chris Hipkins.

In mid-March 2026, Salesa lost the customs portfolio but gained the associate Pacific Peoples portfolio during a cabinet reshuffle. She also retained the ethnic communities portfolio.

In June 2026, The Spinoff reported that Salesa had used a special taxpayer-funded superannuation scheme and a taxpayer-funded accommodation allowance (worth a combined $72,640 per annum) to buy and stay in her own Wellington apartment. Salesa confirmed that she had bought a Wellington apartment in 2017 for the purpose of attending Parliament and claimed the maximum accommodation allowance against it.

During the 2026 New Zealand general election, Salesa contested the Ōtāhuhu electorate for Labour. She was ranked 24th on the Labour Party list. Based on preliminary results, Salesa retained Ōtāhuhu by a landslide margin of 10,558 votes.

New Zealand Parliament
Preceded by New electorate	Member of Parliament for Panmure-Ōtāhuhu; 2020–present	Incumbent
Preceded by Ross Robertson	Member of Parliament for Manukau East; 2014–2020	Succeeded by Electorate abolished
Political offices
Preceded by Nick Smith	Minister for Building and Construction; 2017–2020	Succeeded by Poto Williams
Preceded by Judith Collins	Minister for Ethnic Communities; 2017–2020	Succeeded by Priyanca Radhakrishnan
Preceded by Kris Faafoi	Minister of Customs; 2019–2020	Succeeded by Meka Whaitiri
