= Manukau East =

Manukau East electorate boundaries used since the 2014 election

Manukau East was a New Zealand parliamentary electorate that returned one member of parliament to the House of Representatives. It was first formed for the 1996 election. Between the 2014 election and the 2020 electorate adjustment it was held by Jenny Salesa, a member of the Labour Party, who also won the replacement Panmure-Ōtāhuhu seat in the 2020 election.

== Population centres ==
In 2007, large changes were made to the Manukau East electorate. Its northern boundary extended past the Tamaki River to almost as far as Sylvia Park Rd to incorporate Middlemore, Ōtāhuhu and Westfield. Its eastern boundary shifted west to East Tamaki Rd resulting in East Tamaki and Botany Downs being included in the new Botany electorate. Most of Ōtara and Papatoetoe West are now also included in the electorate.

In the 2013 electorate boundary review, it was found that Manukau East electorate was above quota (based on the 2013 census). The draft proposal by the Representation Commission sees some population at Westfield to be transferred to the Maungakiekie electorate.

== History ==
Manukau East was created for the 1996 election. It has been represented by two MPs, both of the Labour Party, Ross Robertson and Jenny Salesa. It was considered one of Labour's safest electorates. On 6 June 2013 Robertson announced that he would retire from Parliament in order to pursue a career in local body politics. Jenny Salesa replaced him, with a comfortable, although smaller, majority of 13,254.

During the 2020 electorate adjustment, the electorate was replaced with Panmure-Ōtāhuhu.

=== Members of Parliament ===
Unless otherwise stated, all MPs terms began and ended at general elections.

Key

Labour Progressive National NZ First

Election	Winner
1996 election	Ross Robertson
1999 election	Ross Robertson
2002 election	Ross Robertson
2005 election	Ross Robertson
2008 election	Ross Robertson
2011 election	Ross Robertson
2014 election	Jenny Salesa
2017 election	Jenny Salesa
(Electorate abolished in 2020; see Panmure-Ōtāhuhu)

=== List MPs ===
Election	Winner
2002 election	Matt Robson
2002 election	Kelly Chal
2008 election	Kanwaljit Singh Bakshi
2011 election	Kanwaljit Singh Bakshi
2011 election	Asenati Taylor
2014 election	Kanwaljit Singh Bakshi
2017 election	Kanwaljit Singh Bakshi

== Election results ==
=== 2017 election ===
2017 general election: Manukau East
Notes:	Blue background denotes the winner of the electorate vote. Pink background denotes a candidate elected from their party list. Yellow background denotes an electorate win by a list member, or other incumbent. A ✓ or ✗ denotes status of any incumbent, win or lose respectively.						
Party	Candidate	Votes	%	±%	Party votes	%	±%
Labour	✓ Jenny Salesa	17,402	66.44	−1.56	17,730	65.09	+2.57
National	Kanwaljit Singh Bakshi	4,813	18.37	+1.36	6,190	22.72	+2.80
NZ First	William Flesher	1,511	5.77	−1.34	1,550	5.69	−1.96
Māori Party	Tuilagi Esera	698	2.66	—	403	1.48	+1.17
Green	Raj Singh	650	2.48	−0.12	601	2.21	−1.38
Opportunities	Ted Johnston	308	1.18	—	188	0.69	—
ACT	Bhupinder Singh	201	0.77	—	70	0.26	−0.40
Independent	Tamatoa Richmond	80	0.31	—			
People's Party					78	0.29	—
Legalise Cannabis					70	0.26	−0.02
Conservative					50	0.18	−1.86
Mana Party					23	0.08	—
United Future					12	0.04	−0.03
Internet					10	0.04	—
Outdoors					9	0.03	—
Ban 1080					3	0.01	±0.00
Democrats					3	0.01	±0.00
Informal votes		531			245		
Total valid votes		26,194			27,240		
Labour hold	Majority	12,589	48.07	−2.92			

=== 2014 election ===
2014 general election: Manukau East
Notes:	Blue background denotes the winner of the electorate vote. Pink background denotes a candidate elected from their party list. Yellow background denotes an electorate win by a list member, or other incumbent. A ✓ or ✗ denotes status of any incumbent, win or lose respectively.						
Party	Candidate	Votes	%	±%	Party votes	%	±%
Labour	Jenny Salesa	17,676	68.00	−9.11	16,925	62.52	−4.16
National	Kanwaljit Singh Bakshi	4,422	17.01	+2.85	5,392	19.92	+0.31
NZ First	Asenati Taylor	1,847	7.11	+3.14	2,072	7.65	+1.33
Green	Umesh Perinpanayagam	675	2.60	+2.60	971	3.59	+0.20
Conservative	Vili Taukolo	497	1.91	+0.22	553	2.04	+0.58
Mana	Joe Trinder	259	1.00	−0.83			
Communist League	Annalucia Vermunt	43	0.17	−0.08			
Internet Mana					276	1.02	+0.08 (Note: 2014 Internet Mana swing is relative to the votes for Mana in 2011; it shared a party list with Internet in the 2014 election.)
ACT					179	0.66	−0.13
Māori Party					84	0.31	−0.18
Legalise Cannabis					76	0.28	−0.06
United Future					18	0.07	−0.08
Focus					7	0.03	+0.03
Ban 1080					4	0.01	+0.01
Civilian					4	0.01	+0.01
Democrats					4	0.01	−0.02
Independent Coalition					4	0.01	+0.01
Informal votes		576			502		
Total valid votes		25,995			27,071		
Turnout		27,071	66.86	+2.52			
Labour hold	Majority	13,254	50.99	−11.97			

=== 2011 election ===
2011 general election: Manukau East
Notes:	Blue background denotes the winner of the electorate vote. Pink background denotes a candidate elected from their party list. Yellow background denotes an electorate win by a list member, or other incumbent. A ✓ or ✗ denotes status of any incumbent, win or lose respectively.						
Party	Candidate	Votes	%	±%	Party votes	%	±%
Labour	✓ Ross Robertson	19,399	77.11	+11.03	17,977	66.68	+7.35
National	Kanwaljit Singh Bakshi	3,561	14.16	−4.26	5,287	19.61	−4.58
NZ First	Asenati Taylor	999	3.97	+3.97	1,703	6.32	+2.64
Mana	John Minto	461	1.83	+1.83	253	0.94	+0.94
Conservative	Frank John Naea	425	1.69	+1.69	393	1.46	+1.46
ACT	Jonathan MacFarlane	248	0.99	−1.67	143	0.53	−1.08
Communist League	Felicity Coggan	63	0.25	+0.19			
Green					913	3.39	+1.60
Māori Party					131	0.49	−0.53
Legalise Cannabis					93	0.34	-0.001
United Future					41	0.15	−0.31
Libertarianz					10	0.04	+0.02
Alliance					9	0.03	±0.00
Democrats					7	0.03	±0.00
Informal votes		1,371			524		
Total valid votes		25,156			26,960		
Labour hold	Majority	15,838	62.96	+15.29			

Electorate (as at 26 November 2011): 41,901

=== 2008 election ===
2008 general election: Manukau East
Notes:	Blue background denotes the winner of the electorate vote. Pink background denotes a candidate elected from their party list. Yellow background denotes an electorate win by a list member, or other incumbent. A ✓ or ✗ denotes status of any incumbent, win or lose respectively.						
Party	Candidate	Votes	%	±%	Party votes	%	±%
Labour	✓ Ross Robertson	17,254	66.08		16,137	59.33	
National	Kanwaljit Singh Bakshi	4,809	18.42		6,579	24.19	
Pacific	Tevaga Sione Leavasa	1,406	5.39		1,219	4.48	
ACT	Lyn Murphy	693	2.65		439	1.61	
Family Party	Papali'i Poutoa Papali'I	648	2.48		238	0.88	
Green	Donna Wynd	628	2.41		487	1.79	
Progressive	Trevor Barnard	333	1.28		374	1.38	
Kiwi	Kevin Stitt	155	0.59		102	0.38	
United Future	Manogi Turua Head	112	0.43		126	0.46	
Workers Party	Daphna Whitmore	55	0.21		25	0.09	
Communist League	Annalucia Vermunt	16	0.06				
NZ First					999	3.67	
Māori Party					276	1.01	
Legalise Cannabis					94	0.35	
Bill and Ben					69	0.25	
Alliance					9	0.03	
RAM					9	0.03	
Democrats					7	0.03	
Libertarianz					6	0.02	
RONZ					4	0.01	
Informal votes		459			287		
Total valid votes		26,109			27,199		
Labour hold	Majority	12,445	47.67				

=== 2005 election ===
2005 general election: Manukau East
Notes:	Blue background denotes the winner of the electorate vote. Pink background denotes a candidate elected from their party list. Yellow background denotes an electorate win by a list member, or other incumbent. A ✓ or ✗ denotes status of any incumbent, win or lose respectively.						
Party	Candidate	Votes	%	±%	Party votes	%	±%
Labour	✓ Ross Robertson	18,804	59.40	−3.51	18,100	54.87	−1.31
National	Ken Yee	8,914	28.16		10,219	30.98	+14.86
Destiny	Richard Lewis	1,111	3.51		472	1.43	
ACT	Hamish Stevens	725	2.29		629	1.91	−5.03
Green	Irene Bentley	648	2.05		583	1.77	−0.79
Progressive	Trevor Barnard	407	1.29		525	1.59	−0.40
United Future	Ram Parkash	336	1.06		486	1.47	−3.45
Māori Party	Mama Tere Strickland Tahere	303	0.96		204	0.62	
Family Rights	Tapu Anne Po-Wihongi	225	0.71		145	0.44	
Independent	Raj Subramanian	76	0.24				
Alliance	Jill Ovens	64	0.20		32	0.10	−0.69
Direct Democracy	Seira Perese	42	0.13		9	0.03	
NZ First					1,434	4.35	−3.76
Legalise Cannabis					62	0.19	−0.29
Christian Heritage					44	0.13	−1.29
Libertarianz					15	0.05	
99 MP					8	0.02	
One NZ					8	0.02	−0.03
RONZ					8	0.02	
Democrats					6	0.02	
Informal votes		555			204		
Total valid votes		31,655			32,989		
Labour hold	Majority	9,890	31.24	−9.29			

=== 2002 election ===
2002 general election: Manukau East
Notes:	Blue background denotes the winner of the electorate vote. Pink background denotes a candidate elected from their party list. Yellow background denotes an electorate win by a list member, or other incumbent. A ✓ or ✗ denotes status of any incumbent, win or lose respectively.						
Party	Candidate	Votes	%	±%	Party votes	%	±%
Labour	✓ Ross Robertson	16,543	62.91	+7.83	15,235	56.18	+10.79
National	Arthur Anae	5,886	22.38		4,371	16.12	−15.94
ACT	Gerald Trass	1,393	5.30		1,883	6.94	−0.56
United Future	Kelly Chal	884	3.36		1,335	4.92	
Progressive	Matt Robson	775	2.95		540	1.99	
Christian Heritage	Mary Mere Paki	511	1.94		384	1.42	−0.72
Alliance	Simon Shields	236	0.90		214	0.79	−4.33
Anti-Capitalist Alliance	Mark Muller	67	0.25				
NZ First					2,199	8.11	+4.91
Green					695	2.56	+0.30
Legalise Cannabis					129	0.48	−0.09
ORNZ					95	0.35	
Mana Māori					15	0.06	+0.05
One NZ					14	0.05	+0.03
NMP					8	0.03	+0.02
Informal votes		481			159		
Total valid votes		26,295			27,117		
Labour hold	Majority	10.657	40.53	+16.47			

=== 1999 election ===
1999 general election: Manukau East
Notes:	Blue background denotes the winner of the electorate vote. Pink background denotes a candidate elected from their party list. Yellow background denotes an electorate win by a list member, or other incumbent. A ✓ or ✗ denotes status of any incumbent, win or lose respectively.						
Party	Candidate	Votes	%	±%	Party votes	%	±%
Labour	✓ Ross Robertson	16,224	55.08	+21.38	13,545	45.39	+11.69
National	Ken Yee	9,138	31.02	−1.83	9,568	32.06	−4.58
ACT	Charles Lowndes	1,474	5.00		2,237	7.50	+1.2
Alliance	Bruce Bennett Holm	944	3.20		1,527	5.12	−0.81
Christian Heritage	David Simpkin	602	2.04		640	2.14	
NZ First	Malia Kamilo Hamani	429	1.46		955	3.20	−7.15
Mauri Pacific	Danny Turia	390	1.32		106	0.36	
Independent	Paul Teio	88	0.30				
Workers' Party	Daphna Whitmore	88	0.30				
Reform Party	Dave Bergersen	50	0.17				
Mana Wahine Te Ira Tangata	Mareta Wiringi	29	0.10				
Green					673	2.26	
Legalise Cannabis					170	0.57	−0.51
Christian Democrats					160	0.54	
United NZ					123	0.41	−0.24
Libertarianz					45	0.15	+0.13
Animals First					32	0.11	−0.02
McGillicuddy Serious					23	0.08	−0.06
Natural Law					11	0.04	−0.07
The People's Choice					8	0.03	
One NZ					5	0.02	
Republican					4	0.01	
Mana Māori					3	0.01	−0.02
South Island					3	0.01	
NMP					2	0.01	
Freedom Movement					1	0.00	
Informal votes		766			381		
Total valid votes		29,456			29,841		
Labour hold	Majority	14,750	24.06	+9.97			

=== 1996 election ===
1996 general election: Manukau East
Notes:	Blue background denotes the winner of the electorate vote. Pink background denotes a candidate elected from their party list. Yellow background denotes an electorate win by a list member, or other incumbent. A ✓ or ✗ denotes status of any incumbent, win or lose respectively.						
Party	Candidate	Votes	%	±%	Party votes	%	±%
Labour	Ross Robertson	15,269	46.93		11,037	33.70	
National	Ken Yee	10,686	32.85		11,996	36.63	
NZ First	Ngaire Clark	2,361	7.26		3,390	10.35	
Conservatives	✗ Trevor Rogers	1,497	4.60		110	0.34	
Alliance	Tafa Mulitalo	1,108	3.41		1,941	5.93	
ACT	Patrick Cole	1,058	3.25		2,064	6.30	
United NZ	Ted Faleauto	292	0.90		212	0.65	
Advance New Zealand	Taimalelagi Tofilau	161	0.49		64	0.20	
Natural Law	Greg Dodds	72	0.22		37	0.11	
Communist League	Annalucia Vermunt	30	0.09				
Christian Coalition					1,151	3.51	
Legalise Cannabis					355	1.08	
Ethnic Minority Party					190	0.58	
Progressive Green					49	0.15	
McGillicuddy Serious					47	0.14	
Animals First					43	0.13	
Superannuitants & Youth					24	0.07	
Green Society					17	0.05	
Mana Māori					11	0.03	
Asia Pacific United					6	0.02	
Libertarianz					6	0.02	
Te Tawharau					0	0.00	
Informal votes		398			182		
Total valid votes		32,534			32,750		
Labour win new seat	Majority	4,583	14.09				
