= Ross Robertson =

New Zealand politician (born 1949)

Ross Robertson QSO JP
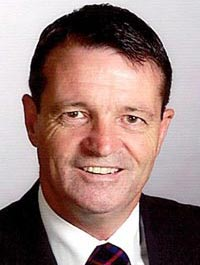

Member of the New Zealand Parliament for Manukau East
- In office 12 October 1996 – 20 September 2014
- Succeeded by: Jenny Salesa

Member of the New Zealand Parliament for Papatoetoe
- In office 15 August 1987 – 12 October 1996
- Preceded by: Eddie Isbey
- Succeeded by: Constituency abolished

Personal details
- Born: Harold Valentine Ross Robertson; 22 May 1949 (age 77) Wellington, New Zealand
- Party: Labour

Harold Valentine Ross Robertson (born 22 May 1949), known as Ross Robertson, is a New Zealand politician for the Labour Party. He was a Member of Parliament from 1987 until his retirement in 2014. He also served as president of Parliamentarians for Global Action.

== Early life ==
Robertson was born in Wellington on 22 May 1949. Before entering politics, he was an industrial engineer.

== Political career ==
=== Member of Parliament ===
New Zealand Parliament
Years	Term	Electorate	List	Party
1987–1990	42nd	Papatoetoe		Labour
1990–1993	43rd	Papatoetoe		Labour
1993–1996	44th	Papatoetoe		Labour
1996–1999	45th	Manukau East	none	Labour
1999–2002	46th	Manukau East	none	Labour
2002–2005	47th	Manukau East	none	Labour
2005–2008	48th	Manukau East	none	Labour
2008–2011	49th	Manukau East	none	Labour
2011–2014	50th	Manukau East	none	Labour

Robertson was first elected to Parliament in the 1987 election, representing Papatoetoe replacing the retiring Eddie Isbey. He would hold the seat until the 1996 elections, when the Papatoetoe seat was abolished. That same year, Robertson was then elected to represent the replacement seat of Manukau East. In November 1990 he was appointed as Labour's spokesperson for Energy and Statistics by Labour leader Mike Moore.

In the Fifth Labour Government of New Zealand he was an assistant speaker, able to preside when any of the other presiding officers are unavailable.

In 2006 Robertson reported to the New Zealand Police that a marijuana dealer was operating next to his electorate office in Ōtara.

In 2013, Robertson voted against the Marriage Amendment Bill, which aimed to permit same-sex marriage in New Zealand, with fellow Labour MPs William Sio, Rino Tirikatene and Damien O'Connor.

On 6 June 2013, Robertson announced that he would retire from Parliament in order to pursue a career in local-body politics.

Robertson was appointed a Companion of the Queen's Service Order, for services as a Member of Parliament, in the 2015 New Year Honours.

=== Local-body politics ===
Robertson was elected to the Ōtara-Papatoetoe Local Board in the 2013 Auckland elections and was re-elected in 2016 and 2019.

New Zealand Parliament
Preceded by Eddie Isbey	Member of Parliament for Papatoetoe; 1987–1996	Constituency abolished
New constituency	Member of Parliament for Manukau East; 1996–2014	Succeeded by Jenny Salesa
