= Kanwaljit Singh Bakshi =

New Zealand politician of the National Party

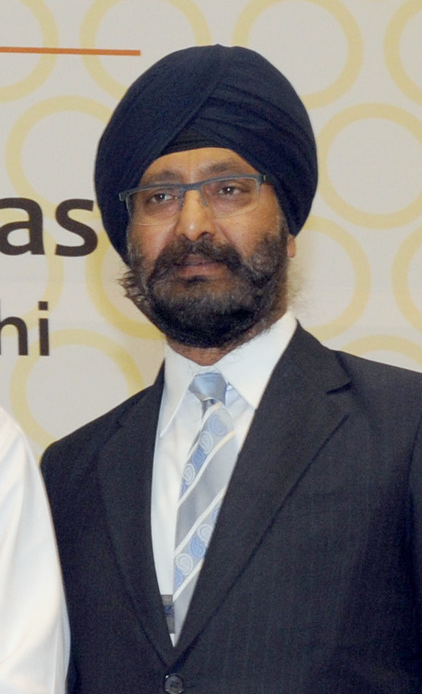

Member of the New Zealand Parliament for National Party List
- In office 8 November 2008 – 17 October 2020

Personal details
- Born: 20 February 1964 (age 62) Delhi, India
- Party: New Zealand National Party
- Spouse: Irvinder Kaur
- Education: University of Delhi

Kanwaljit Singh Bakshi (born 20 February 1964) is an Indian-born New Zealand politician and a member of the National Party. He was a Member of Parliament as a list MP from the 2008 election to the 2020 election.

== Early life ==
In an interview, Bakshi said that he was born in Delhi, India. His father, Bakshi Jagdev Singh was a politician. Bakshi attended Guru Harkrishan Public School and acquired a degree in Commerce from the University of Delhi in 1985. His first job after graduation was in the family's freight business where he eventually became a marketing manager. Bakshi married Irvinder Kaur in 1989, and moved to New Zealand in 2001.

== Member of Parliament ==
New Zealand Parliament
Years	Term	Electorate	List	Party
2008–2011	49th	List	38	National
2011–2014	50th	List	35	National
2014–2017	51st	List	32	National
2017–2020	52nd	List	32	National

Bakshi was both New Zealand's first Indian and first Sikh Member of Parliament. He was elected in the 2008 election by way of the party list, having unsuccessfully contested the Manukau East electorate. Bakshi recontested Manukau East in 2011, 2014 and 2017; he was elected each time as a list MP. In his parliamentary career, Bakshi served as Chairperson of the Law and Order Select Committee (2015–2017), Parliamentary Private Secretary to the Minister of Police, and National Party spokesperson for Internal Affairs (2017–2020) and Ethnic Communities (2020).

In early 2009 and again in August 2009, he was investigated by police and Immigration New Zealand over a scheme where he allegedly made false job offers to Indian people wishing to enter New Zealand. Bakshi was later cleared by the police of wrongdoing; the main complainant was not interviewed as they had had left the country.

In June 2010, his Military Manoeuvres Act Repeal Bill was drawn from the member's ballot. The bill passed into law in April 2012. A second member's bill, seeking to legalise the carrying of kirpans by Sikhs, was drafted but not drawn.

Kanwaljit accompanied New Zealand's Prime Minister John Key on his visit to India in June 2011. He has been recognised for fostering ties between New Zealand and India. Bakshi has also assisted the New Zealand Government in publishing their policies in Indian languages such as Hindi, Gujarati and Punjabi for the benefit of the Indian community. He also received the Pravasi Bharatiya Samman Award at a ceremony in India in January 2015 for building a positive profile of people of Indian origin in New Zealand and South Pacific.

Bakshi voted against the first reading of Louisa Wall's same-sex marriage bill in August 2012. Bakshi later attended a protest against Louisa Wall's bill stating to the crowd of around 250: "We understand that God made us and we are firm believers [that] marriage is between a man and woman, I tell you, the majority of the National Party MPs voted against this bill. There were only three Labour party MPs who voted against this bill. So you can understand who believes in Christianity, who believes in this bill. It is the National Party." Bakshi later conceded that in fact a majority of National MPs had voted for the bill.

In 2016 Bakshi faced criticism for comparing international students to a commodity such as fridges. In an interview, following a question about treating Indian students as "economic commodities", Bakshi said "if New Zealand gets fridges from China and they're faulty then they send them back".

In Bakshi's fourth term, the National Party was in Opposition and he was the party's spokesperson for Internal Affairs (2017–2020) and Ethnic Communities (2020). He voted against the End of Life Choice Act 2019 and the Abortion Legislation Act 2020.

During the 2020 New Zealand general election, Bakshi contested the Panmure-Ōtāhuhu electorate (which had replaced the Manukau East electorate due to boundary changes). He again lost the electorate seat to Labour candidate Jenny Salesa, by a final margin of 18,626 votes. Bakshi had been raised in the National Party list, going from 32nd to 24th, but the National Party as a whole fared poorly in the election, receiving only 33 seats of which only 10 went to list MPs. Bakshi did not rank high enough on National's party list to be re-elected, and so left Parliament.
