= Ministry for Pacific Peoples =

Government ministry of New Zealand

- Māori: Te Manatū mō Ngā Iwi o Te Moana-nui-a-Kiwa

Agency overview
- Formed: 1990; 36 years ago
- Jurisdiction: New Zealand
- Headquarters: Level 2 101-103 The Terrace, Wellington WELLINGTON 6140
- Employees: 48 FTE staff
- Annual budget: Vote Pacific Peoples; Total budget for 2019/20 ▲$19,863,000
- Minister responsible: Hon Paul Goldsmith, Minister for Pacific Peoples
- Agency executive: Ms Gerardine Clifford-Lidstone, Secretary for Pacific Peoples and Chief Executive, Ministry for Pacific Peoples
- Website: www.mpp.govt.nz

The Ministry for Pacific Peoples (Māori: Te Manatū mō Ngā Iwi o Te Moana-nui-a-Kiwa; abbreviated MPP), formerly the Ministry of Pacific Island Affairs, is the public service department of New Zealand charged with advising the New Zealand Government on policies and issues affecting Pasifika communities in New Zealand. MPP seeks to promote the status of Pasifika peoples in New Zealand by keeping them informed of the issues, then acting as an advocate in dealing with other state sector organisations.

== Functions and structure ==
The Ministry for Pacific Peoples' stated objective is to promote the development of Pasifika living in New Zealand so that they can contribute fully to New Zealand's social and economic life. The Ministry advocates for the Pacific community within the public sector by working with other government agencies and departments to meet Pasifika people's needs, and monitoring policies that affect Pacific people. It also encourages Pasifika leadership in public sector organisations whose decisions affect Pacific communities.

The current Minister for Pacific Peoples is Shane Reti. The current Chief Executive of the Ministry for Pacific Peoples is Gerardine Clifford-Lidstone.

== History ==
=== Origins ===
The Ministry of Pacific Island Affairs was first established in 1990 to look after New Zealand's growing Pasifika population. Prior to that, Pacific communities living in New Zealand fell under the responsibility of several government departments including the Te Puni Kōkiri (Ministry of Māori Development) and the Department of Internal Affairs's Pacific Affairs Unit. In 1975, Pacific communities established the Pacific Island Advisory Council to address their socio-economic needs. The council established education resource and multicultural centres while the Pasifika communities lobbied for a stand-alone ministry.

=== Expansion ===
On 22 December 2015, the Ministry announced it would be changing its name to the Ministry for Pacific Peoples, to reflect the growing number of Pasifika children born in New Zealand. A new visual identity, designed by two design students of Pacific descent and based around three manu (birds), was also introduced to represent a message of travel, freedom and success.

On 31 August 2017, the Ministry relocated its Auckland office from East Tāmaki to a new office in Manukau, which is home to most of the country's Pacific population. This office is part of a joint hub shared with Te Puni Kōkiri, which deals with Māori affairs.

=== 2023 expenditure controversies ===
On 9 August 2023, the Public Service Commissioner Peter Hughes rebuked the Ministry for spending almost NZ$40,000 of public funds to farewell its outgoing chief executive, Secretary for Pacific Peoples Leauanae Laulu Mac Leauanae in October 2022. These expenses included gifts, photography, flowers, ceremonial drummers, and travel and accommodation for Leuanae's family. On 17 August, two men were removed from the Ministry's headquarters after attempting to film staff and seeking comment in relation to sensitive expenditure. Later that day, ACT Party leader David Seymour joked about sending "someone like Guy Fawkes" to bomb the Ministry during an interview with Newstalk ZB. This was a reference to the Gunpowder Plot, planned in 1605 by English Catholic terrorists but foiled at the last minute. ACT has advocated the abolition of the Ministry alongside the Human Rights Commission and Ministry for Women. Seymour's remarks were condemned by Prime Minister Chris Hipkins, Deputy Prime Minister Carmel Sepuloni, former National Party minister Alfred Ngaro, and Te Pāti Māori co-leader Debbie Ngarewa-Packer.

In mid–September 2023, the National Party's public service spokesperson Simeon Brown disclosed that the Ministry had spent NZ$52,587.76 on four post-budget breakfasts this year in Christchurch, Auckland, Wellington and Hawke's Bay. In response, the Minister for Pacific Peoples Barbara Edmonds and Prime Minister Hipkins defended these post-budget breakfasts as part of the Government's wider engagement with Pasifika New Zealanders on annual budgets and government policies. Hipkins also accused the National, ACT, and New Zealand First parties of using Pasifika peoples as a "punching bag."

=== Cuts under the Sixth National Government ===
In late March 2024, the Public Service Association (PSA) confirmed that the Ministry was considering a proposal to cut 63 of its 156 jobs, roughly 40% of its workforce. The Ministry's proposed job cuts were criticised by PSA national secretary, the Green Party's Pacific peoples spokesperson Teanau Tuiono, and Labour's Pacific peoples spokesperson Carmel Sepuloni, who said that it would hurt the Ministry's ability to support impoverished Pasifika communities. Prime Minister Christopher Luxon disagreed with the PSA's claim that the Sixth National Government regarded the Pasifika community as unimportant, describing the job cuts as part of the Government's efforts to ensure a "culture of financial discipline" in response to what he regarded as the previous Labour Government's excessive spending.

In mid-May 2025, the Sixth National Government cut NZ$36 million from the Ministry's budget as part of the 2025 New Zealand budget, on top of the NZ$26 million cuts that occurred as a result of the 2024 New Zealand budget. Consequently, the Ministry will close the Tauola Business Fund. The Ministry would still receive NZ$6.3 million each year to support Pasifika businesses through the Pacific Business Trust and the Pacific Business Village. In addition, the Tupu Aotearoa employment programme had its funding reduced to N$5.25 million per annum. In addition, funding for the Dawn Raids reconciliation programme for the 2027/28 financial year was cut, saving the Ministry NZ$1 million. In response to criticism, the Pacific Peoples Minister Shane Reti defended the cuts to the Ministry as necessary for stimulating "efficiency and growth," adding that money would be reallocated to frontline services. Green Party Pasifika spokesperson Teanau Tuiono disagreed with Reti, saying that the cutbacks affected Pacific-specific programmes and cultural support.

== List of ministers ==
The table below lists ministers who have held responsibility for Pacific Island Affairs. Initially, the title used to be Minister of Pacific Island Affairs but was renamed Minister for Pacific Peoples on 22 December 2015.

- Hon. Richard Prebble, Labour Party, Fourth Labour Government, 15 August 1984- 25 August 1988, 4 February 1990 – 6 September 1990
- Hon. Russell Marshall, Labour Party, Fourth Labour Government, 6 September 1988 – 12 December 1989
- Hon. Bill Birch, National Party Fourth National Government, 28 November 1990 – 22 August 1991
- Hon. Don McKinnon, National Party, Fourth National Government, 24 September 1991- 13 August 1998
- Hon. Tuariki Delamere, Te Tawharau, Fourth National Government, 18 August 1998-late 1999
- Hon. Mark Gosche, Labour Party, Fifth Labour Government, 10 December 1999 – 12 May 2003
- Hon. Phil Goff, Labour Party, Fifth Labour Government, 19 May 2003 – 5 November 2007
- Hon. Luamanuvao Winnie Laban, Labour Party, Fifth Labour Government, 5 November 2007 – 19 November 2008
- Hon. Georgina te Heuheu, National Party, Fifth National Government, 19 November 2008 – 14 December 2011
- Hon. Hekia Parata, National Party, Fifth National Government, 14 December 2011 – 27 January 2014
- Hon. Peseta Sam Lotu-Iiga, National Party, Fifth National Government, 28 January 2014 – 20 December 2016
- Hon. Alfred Ngaro, National Party, Fifth National Government, 20 December 2016 – 26 October 2017
- Hon. Aupito William Sio, Labour Party, Sixth Labour Government, 26 October 2017– 31 January 2023
- Hon. Barbara Edmonds, Labour Party, Sixth Labour Government, 1 February 2023 - 27 November 2023
- Hon. Shane Reti, National Party, Sixth National Government, 27 November 2023 - 7 April 2026
- Hon. Paul Goldsmith, Sixth National Government, 7 April 2026 - present
