= Sheree Trotter =

Writer and historian in New Zealand

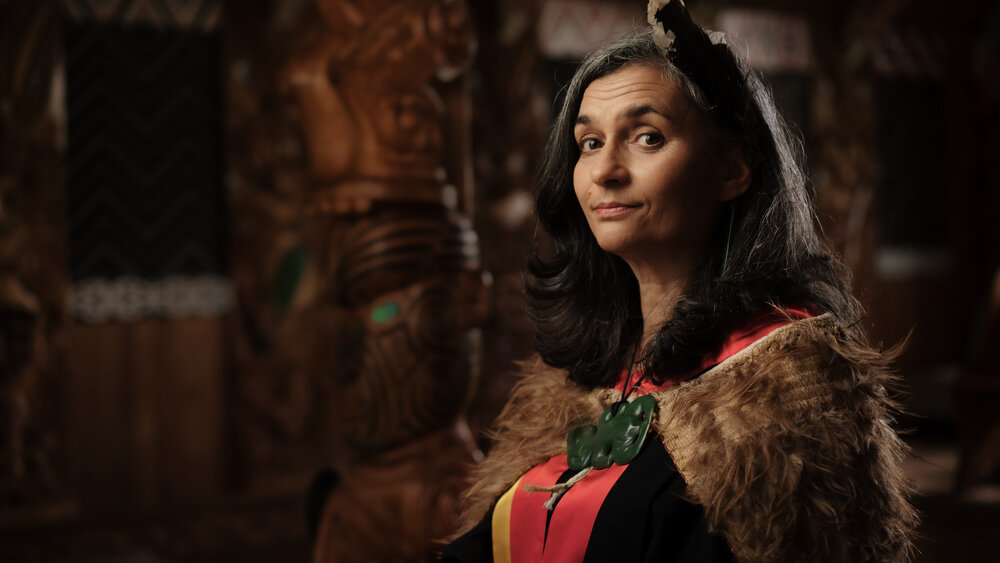
Sheree Trotter in 2020

Sheree Trotter is a writer and historian in New Zealand of Te Arawa iwi origin.

== Background ==
Trotter earned her Ph.D. in history from the University of Auckland, studying the history of Zionism in New Zealand.

== Career ==
Trotter has written about New Zealand's participation in World War I including the Palestine Campaign and about "Holocaust amnesia" in New Zealand. She co-founded the nonprofit Holocaust and Antisemitism Foundation Aotearoa New Zealand (HAFANZ). Trotter also co-founded the nonprofits Indigenous Embassy Jerusalem (IEJ) and Indigenous Coalition for Israel, with former New Zealand government minister Alfred Ngaro, to provide representation in Jerusalem for Indigenous people from around the world. The group held a march in Jerusalem in October 2024, with dozens of Indigenous representatives from around the world, to show support for Israel and for Jews as indigenous to their homeland. At an academic conference following the march, Canadian First Nations activist Karen Restoule discussed how the indigenous narrative has been co-opted to demonize Israel.

Regarding the October 7 attacks and Israel's war against Hamas, Trotter has disputed Richard Jackson and John Hobbs’ comparison between Ukrainians and Palestinians. Trotter asserted that Israel's defensive war against Hamas bears no similarity to Russian aggression in Ukraine.

In June 2024, Trotter traveled to Toronto to join the Walk with Israel event, along with other Indigenous people from various countries. Trotter has detailed similarities between Jews in Israel and other Indigenous peoples, including historical continuity with pre-colonial and/or pre-settler societies, and their resolve to maintain their ancestral language, culture and beliefs as distinct communities.

In mid February 2025, she and her husband Perry Trotter spoke at two Christian Zionist seminars in Dunedin and Invercargill countering criticism of Israel and so-called Replacement theology. The Dunedin seminar was picketed by 20 pro-Palestinian protesters.
