= Dawn raids (New Zealand) =

1974–1980s police raids against Pacific Islanders

The dawn raids were crackdowns in New Zealand from 1974 to 1979 and then sporadically afterward on alleged illegal overstayers from the Pacific Islands. The raids were first introduced in 1974 by Prime Minister Norman Kirk's Labour government, who discontinued them later that year. However, they were later reintroduced and intensified by Rob Muldoon's Third National government. These operations involved special police squads conducting often aggressive raids on the homes and workplaces of overstayers throughout New Zealand, usually at dawn and almost exclusively directed at Pasifika New Zealanders, regardless of their citizenship status. Overstayers and their families were often prosecuted and then deported back to their countries.

The dawn raids were particularly controversial since Pacific Islanders made up only one-third of overstayers but accounted for 86% of those arrested and prosecuted. The majority of overstayers were from Great Britain, Europe, South Africa, and the United States. Effects were particularly felt in Auckland, where two-thirds of the Pasifika community lived at the time. The city's Māori community were also adversely affected because of the similarities in appearance between many Māori and Pasifika. The police controversially told Māori to carry a passport with them, in case they were stopped by police on suspicion of being illegal immigrants. The raids continued until 1979, when they were halted by the Muldoon government as deporting migrant workers was a burden on the struggling economy, but they continued sporadically until the early 1980s.

The raids contributed firmly to the genesis of pan-Pasifika ethnic identity, today one of New Zealand's major ethnic communities, and led to the growth of social justice groups such as the Polynesian Panthers to resist the raids. Melani Anae of the University of Auckland has described the raids as "the most blatantly racist attack on Pacific peoples by the New Zealand government in New Zealand’s history".

The raids damaged New Zealand's diplomatic ties with Pacific Island countries and have met with widespread condemnation in the following years. Prime Minister Helen Clark condemned the raids as "shameful" in 2002 while giving a formal apology to Samoa for New Zealand's colonial administration. In early August 2021, Prime Minister Jacinda Ardern formally apologised for the dawn raids on behalf of the New Zealand Government.

== Background ==
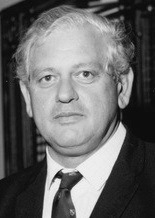
Norman Kirk created a special police task force to deal with overstayers.

The dawn raids were a product of the New Zealand government's immigration policies to attract more Pacific Islanders. Since the 1950s, the New Zealand government had encouraged substantial emigration from several Pacific countries including Samoa, Tonga, and Fiji to fill a labour shortage caused by the post-war economic boom. Consequently, the Pacific Islander population in New Zealand had grown to 45,000 by 1971, with a substantial number overstaying their visas. During the late 1960s and early 1970s, New Zealand's economy had declined due to several international developments: a decline in international wool prices in 1966, Britain joining the European Economic Community in 1973 which deprived New Zealand of a major market for dairy products, and the 1973 oil crisis. This economic downturn led to increased crime, unemployment and other social ailments, which disproportionately affected the Pacific Islander community.

== Policy responses ==
=== Kirk government ===
In response to these social problems, Prime Minister Kirk created a special police task force in Auckland in 1973 which was tasked with dealing with overstayers. From approximately 12 March 1974 the New Zealand Police conducted night and dawn raids against overstayers which sparked criticism from human rights groups and sections of the press. Police were reported to not have allowed some arrestees to dress properly, leading to some making court appearances in pyjamas and clothing loaned from cells. On 21 March 1974, the Labour Immigration Minister Fraser Colman suspended the raids until the government developed a "concerted plan" calling the raids "alien to the New Zealand way of life". The raids were likely a diplomatic embarrassment for Kirk as they occurred during the South Pacific Forum. On 1 April 1974, the government introduced an amnesty which permitted overstayers who registered with the Department of Labour to remain for an additional two months and avoid immediate prosecution. The amnesty coincided with a policy to halt immigration from Tonga for two months other than on humanitarian grounds. Approximately 1500 Tongans left New Zealand during the amnesty while a further 2000 registered to obtain extensions. Appeals to the government by the Tongan Church led to the establishment of a committee of Pacific Island leaders and immigration officials that selected 300 Tongans for permanent residency status. The manufacturing industry in Auckland argued that the expulsion of Pacific Islanders following the amnesty period would damage production. The government subsequently permitted businesses to nominate key workers for an additional two-month extension. Kirk's changes in policies were criticised by the mainstream press, which highlighted crimes and violence perpetrated by Māori and Pacific Islanders.

=== Muldoon government ===
In July 1974, the opposition National Party leader Muldoon promised to reduce immigration and to "get tough" on law and order issues if his party was elected as government. He criticised the Labour government's immigration policies for contributing to the economic recession and a housing shortage. During the 1975 general election, the National Party also played a controversial electoral advertisement that was later criticised for stoking negative racial sentiments about Polynesian migrants. Once in power, Muldoon's government restarted the Kirk government's police raids against Pacific overstayers. The criticism and controversy of the raids among other factors led to the commissioning of a report on the policing of the Immigration Act. The report found that policing of the act was primarily reliant on tip offs by members of the public with the vast majority of informants being Pacific Islanders. The report questioned the legality of raids noting that there were no formal procedures and that police officers entered properties without a warrant using bluffs. It primarily, however, blamed the Immigration Division for causing a situation which required police involvement. Following the report Auckland District Commander Overton instructed his officers to reduce their role in the raids by only standing outside properties during raids to provide protection to immigration officers and by prohibiting raids between 10pm and 6.30am.

==== Stay of Proceedings ====
In April 1976, following a Cabinet meeting in which Immigration Minister Frank Gill described the raids as "somewhat hit and miss", the Muldoon Government introduced a twelve-week stay of proceedings which would allow overstayers to register with the government and avoid prosecution. Those who registered could apply for a short stay, longer stay or permanent residence. Despite the assurances of immunity, 74 warrants were issued for people that had registered. Of the 4647 people that registered all except for 70 were Pacific Islanders and 1723 (approximately 50%) were allowed to stay.

==== Renewed raids ====
In July 1976, Cabinet considered how to manage overstayers who had not signed the register for the stay of proceedings and decided in favour of letting the Police and Immigration ministers devise a plan as opposed to appointing 20 additional immigration officers. Police Minister Allan McCready wrote to Immigration Minister Gill that the police would not be directly involved in the drive against overstayers mentioning the dubious legality of police involvement, a desire to focus on serious criminals, the damage to relations between the community and the police that further raids could have and the potential impact on New Zealand's domestic and international image.

Gill responded by accusing McCready of not fulfilling his responsibilities. Muldoon described renewed raids as the "next logical step after the amnesty" and Cabinet subsequently instructed police to assume full responsibilities for overstayers. Police Minister Allan McCready instructed Police Commissioner Ken Burnside to focus on overstayers above other duties for three months and told him that there were to be "no limitations on the operation". Burnside instructed his District Commanders to proceed without cooperation from the Immigration Department as it would slow down the operation. Random street checks were introduced by many District Commanders in order to fulfil the objective of arresting as many overstayers as possible. Chief Superintendent Berriman who was in charge of the Auckland police, told media that the police would stop anyone "who does not look like a New Zealander or who speaks with a foreign accent". Many New Zealanders including Māori, Niueans, Tokelauans and others with Pacific Island heritage were stopped as part of these checks. Language barriers led to a couple registered on the overstayer register being held in custody for two and a half days before being released. On one 1976 weekend in Auckland, 856 passport checks and 200 house raids led to 23 arrests for overstaying. Berriman admitted to media that most of the people stopped by Police were Pacific Islanders despite maintaining that checks were "random".

== Opposition and abandonment ==
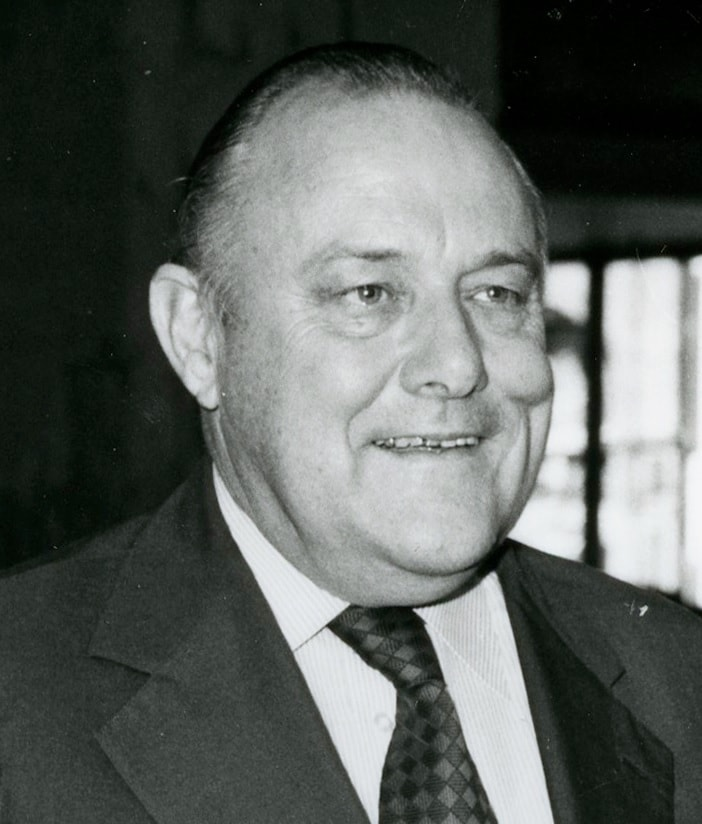
Robert Muldoon led Cabinet during renewed raids and checks against overstayers.

The dawn raids were condemned by different sections of New Zealand society including members of the Pacific Islander and Māori communities, church groups, employers and workers' unions, anti-racist groups, and the opposition Labour Party, despite the policy being of its own making. One Pacific group known as the Polynesian Panthers combated the dawn raids by providing legal aid to detainees and staging retaliatory "dawn raids" on several National cabinet ministers including Bill Birch and Frank Gill, the Minister of Immigration. The Citizens' Association for Racial Equality (CARE) staged protests and succeeded in convincing the British crew of a cruise ship that was supposed to deport Tongan overstayers to refuse to sail with the deportees. The overstayers, however, were subsequently deported on an Air New Zealand flight. The Auckland Committee on Racism and Discrimination (ACORD) and Amnesty Aroha published leaflets highlighting unfair treatment from the police and courts. The raids were also criticised by elements of the police and the ruling National Party for damaging race relations with the Pacific Island community. Kim Workman, who was a senior sergeant in Lower Hutt at the time, left the police force over his opposition to the racism displayed in the police response.

Critics also pointed out that the dawn raids unfairly targeted Pasifika New Zealanders, since Pacific Islanders only comprised one-third of the overstayers but made up 86% of those arrested and prosecuted for overstaying. Often, Pasifika citizens were targeted too. The majority of overstayers were from Great Britain, South Africa and the United States. The Muldoon government's treatment of overstayers also damaged relations with Pacific countries like Samoa and Tonga, and generated criticism from the South Pacific Forum. By 1979, the Muldoon government terminated the dawn raids since the deportation of Pacific over-stayers had failed to alleviate the ailing New Zealand economy.

During the late 1970s and 1980s, Pacific migrants continued to enter and settle in New Zealand through both legal and illegal means. In 2002, the New Zealand Government introduced a Samoan immigration quota that allowed 1,100 Samoan citizens each year to receive New Zealand residency provided they had a job offer and met other immigration requirements. In addition, the Government introduced a Pacific Access category which set quotas for people from Tonga, Fiji, Tuvalu and Kiribati to be granted residency in New Zealand. Pitcairn Islanders were also considered eligible for residence provided they had a firm job offer in NZ.

== Official apology ==
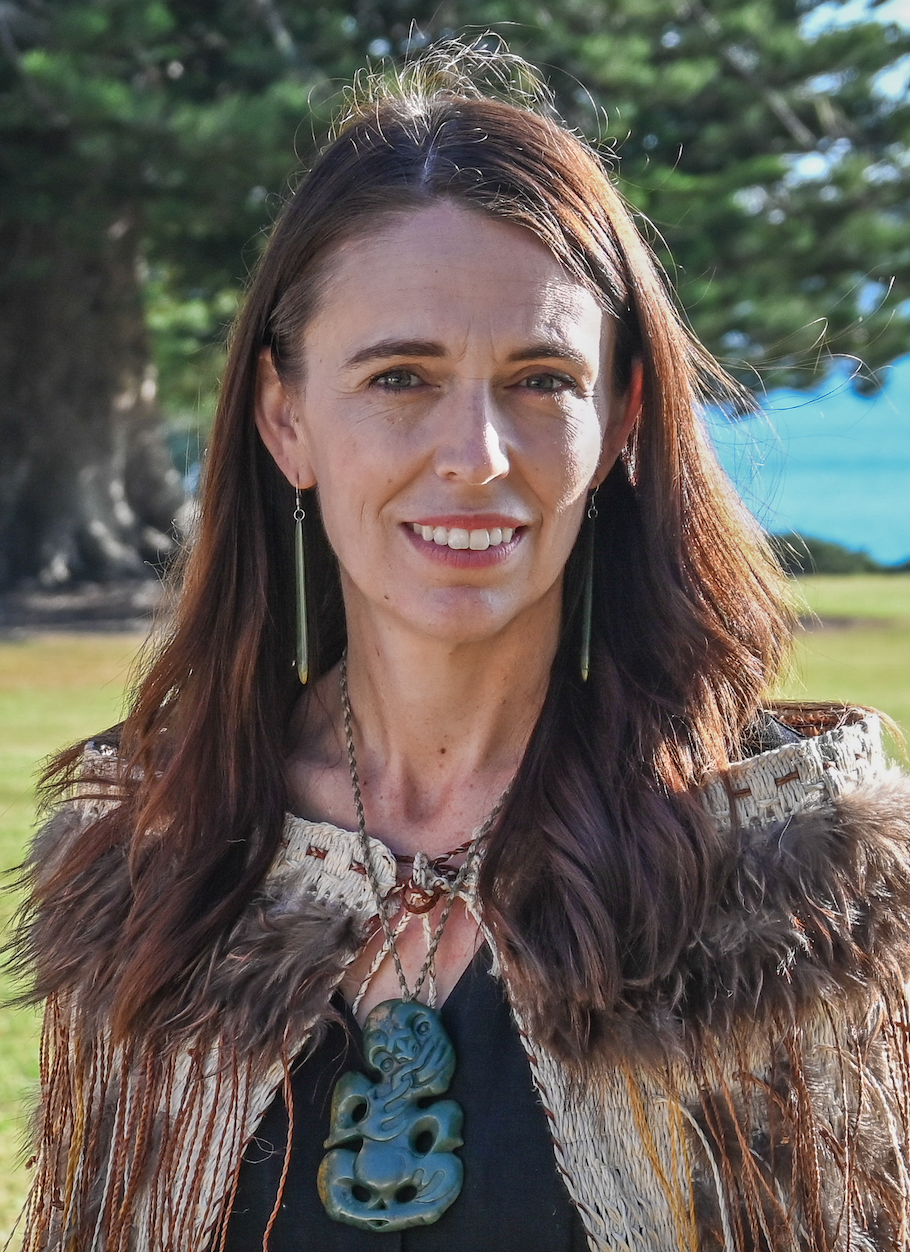
Jacinda Ardern formally apologised for the dawn raids in August 2021.

In April 2021, members of the Pasifika community called for an official apology, describing the dawn raids as "government‑sanctioned racism".

On 14 June 2021, Prime Minister Jacinda Ardern confirmed that the New Zealand Government would formally apologise for the dawn raids at the Auckland Town Hall on 26 June 2021. However, this official apology was postponed due to COVID-19 in New Zealand. That same day though, the Minister for Pacific Peoples William Sio gave an emotional testimony of his family's experiences with a dawn raid, stating that the apology restored mana for the victims of these raids. The opposition National Party leader Judith Collins also supported the Government's official apology for the dawn raids, stating that "this historic act of discrimination against our Pasifika communities caused anguish that reverberated across decades and it is right that we acknowledge this".

While the apology was originally scheduled to be held on 26 June, it was later postponed to 1 August due to the Wellington COVID-19 scare in June 2021. On 1 August, this formal apology was finally given by Ardern in a public ifoga ceremony before 1,000 Pasifika guests at the Auckland Town Hall. As part of the apology, the government announced that it would provide resources for schools to teach the dawn raids, $2.1 million towards academic and vocational scholarships for Pacific communities and $1 million towards Manaaki New Zealand short term scholarship training courses for delegates from Samoa, Tonga, Tuvalu, and Fiji. The apology was covered by several media including The Guardian, Al Jazeera, the Sydney Morning Herald, and BBC News.

Tongan Princess Mele Siu'ilikutapu Kalaniuvalu Fotofili welcomed the apology as a step in the right direction while the Ministry for Culture and Heritage and the Ministry for Pacific Peoples promised to provide support for Pacific artists and historians to work with their communities to develop a comprehensive history of the dawn raids period. University of Auckland senior research fellow Melanie Anae described the apology as insufficient gestures and said that the Government had to go further before they could expect "real change." Members of the Christchurch-based Pacific Youth Leadership and Transformation (PYLAT) welcomed the Government's apology as a start but said that more work was needed to be done.

The apology was lambasted as "hollow" in a 2023 review after it became apparent that Immigration New Zealand was deporting overstayers 'out of hours' even after the apology was made. The review made five recommendations to change the approach to these 'out of hours' visits. Carmel Sepuloni responded on behalf of the government by blaming Immigration New Zealand for failing to honour the apology.

== Legacy ==
=== Art, literature and media ===
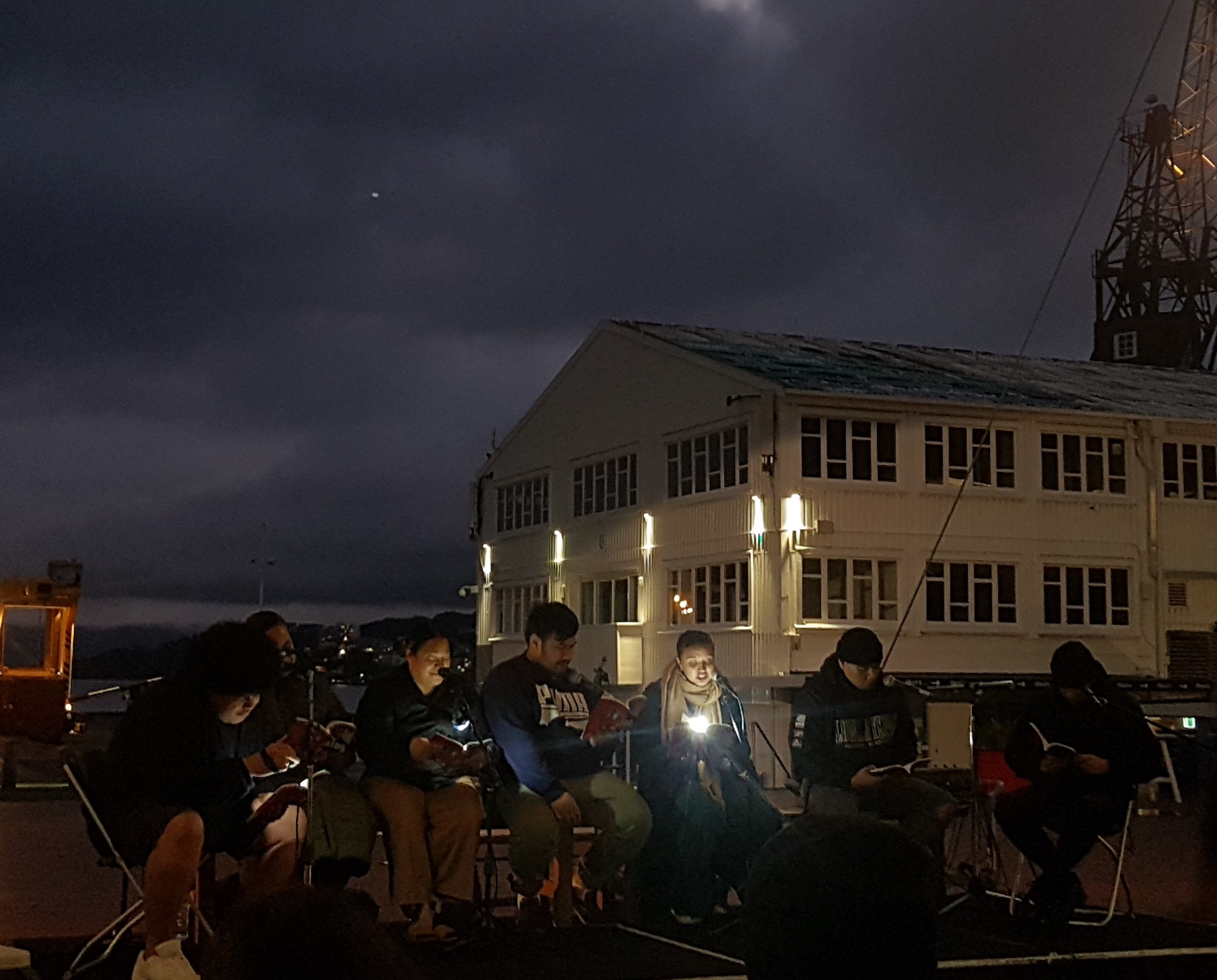
A playreading of 'Dawn Raids' by Oscar Kightley at dawn near the harbour in Te Whanganui-a-Tara

The dawn raids have been the subject of several literary works and media including Oscar Kightley's play Dawn Raids, Pauline Vaeluaga Smith's novel My New Zealand Story: Dawn Raid, Albert Wendt's Sons for the Return Home, the documentaries Dawn Raids (2005), Polynesian Panthers (2010), and Oscar Kightley's 2021 documentary Dawn Raid. The Danny 'Brotha D' Leaosavai'i and Andy Murnane's record label Dawn Raid Entertainment and King Kapisi's clothing label "Overstayer" also re-appropriated the dawn raids for artistic purposes. The dawn raids were also depicted in Halaifonua Finau and Tom Hern's TVNZ miniseries The Panthers and in an episode of the TV series Westside.

The dawn raids were also covered by general and scholarly works including Sharon Alice Liava'a's 1998 MA thesis "Dawn raids: when Pacific Islanders were forced to go "home"," anthropologist Melanie Anae's chapter "Overstayers, Dawn Raids and the Polynesian Panthers" in the edited volume Tangata O Le Moana: New Zealand and the People of the Pacific, and Anae, Lautofa (Ta) Iuli and Leilani Tamu's Polynesian Panthers: Pacific protest and affirmative action in Aotearoa New Zealand 1971–1981.

=== Politics ===
The memory of the dawn raids has been evoked by various critics of Immigration New Zealand's contemporary dawn operations against visa overstayers. In early May 2023, former Polynesian Panther Tigilau Ness, lawyer Soane Foliaki, Deputy Prime Minister Carmel Sepuloni, and Green Party co-leader Marama Davidson, ACT Party leader David Seymour criticised the immigration department for conducting a dawn raid against a Pasifika overstayer in late April 2023. Ness described the raid as traumatising to sleeping families and children. While National Party leader Christopher Luxon acknowledged the historical sensitivity around the dawn raids, he argued that Immigration New Zealand needed to "reserve the option" to use dawn raids against individuals involved in serious criminal offending or who posed a national security risk.

In late May 2023, former Immigration Minister and lawyer Tuariki Delamere criticised Immigration New Zealand for continuing with dawn raids despite the New Zealand Government's apology for the 1970s dawn raids. At the time, Delamere was representing a Chinese overstayer known as "Chen" who claimed that he had been manhandled by immigration compliance officers during his arrest, resulting in a broken left wrist. Chen also disputed Immigration NZ's claim that he had been involved in an organised fraud group involved with organising travel plans and visa applications.

On 10 July 2023, senior lawyer Mike Heron released his independent review into Immigration NZ's "out of hours immigration visits." His review found that no change to New Zealand law and Immigration NZ policy had been made despite the 2021 apology, and that neither Immigration NZ, the Ministry of Business, Innovation and Employment (MBIE), and the Immigration Minister had realigned their practices to reflect the apology. The review made five recommendations including amending the Immigration Act 2009 to specify the criteria for "out of hours" compliances visits; treating "out of hours" compliance visits as a last resort; considering their impact on children, the elderly, and other vulnerable individuals; assessing the reasonableness, proportionality, and public interest of these visits; and that any compliance visits be authorised by the relevant compliance manager and national manager. Immigration Minister Andrew Little apologised that the Government had not updated its guidance on dawn raid policies following the national apology. Similarly, Acting Prime Minister Carmel Sepuloni expressed "deep disappointment" that Immigration NZ had continued with the "dawn raids" despite the 2021 apology.

During the 2023 general election, the Labour Party campaigned on introducing a once-off amnesty for overstayers who had been residing in the country for ten years or more. Immigration Minister Andrew Little said that it was meant to honour the dawn raids apology by backing it up with action. Little estimated that between 14,000 and 20,000 people would be eligible for the amnesty. In response, the Green Party's immigration spokesperson Ricardo Menéndez March described the ten-year deadline as too restrictive and said that the Greens if elected into Parliament would introduce a full amnesty for all overstayers with residency pathways.
