= Indigenous Coalition for Israel =

New Zealand Zionist organization

Indigenous Coalition For Israel
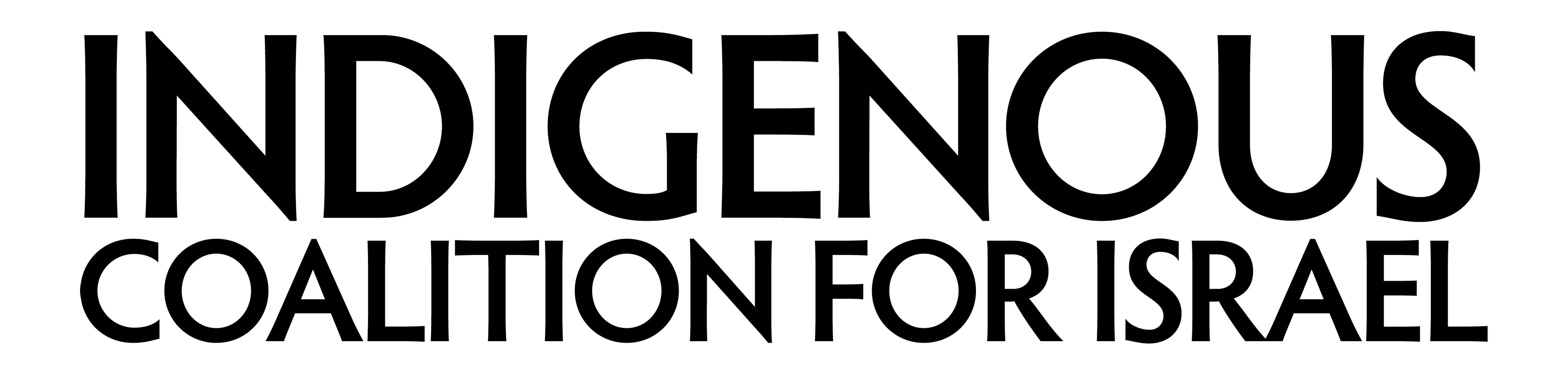
- Founders: Alfred Ngaro; Sheree Trotter
- Established: 2021
- Location: New Zealand
- Website: indigenouscoalition.org

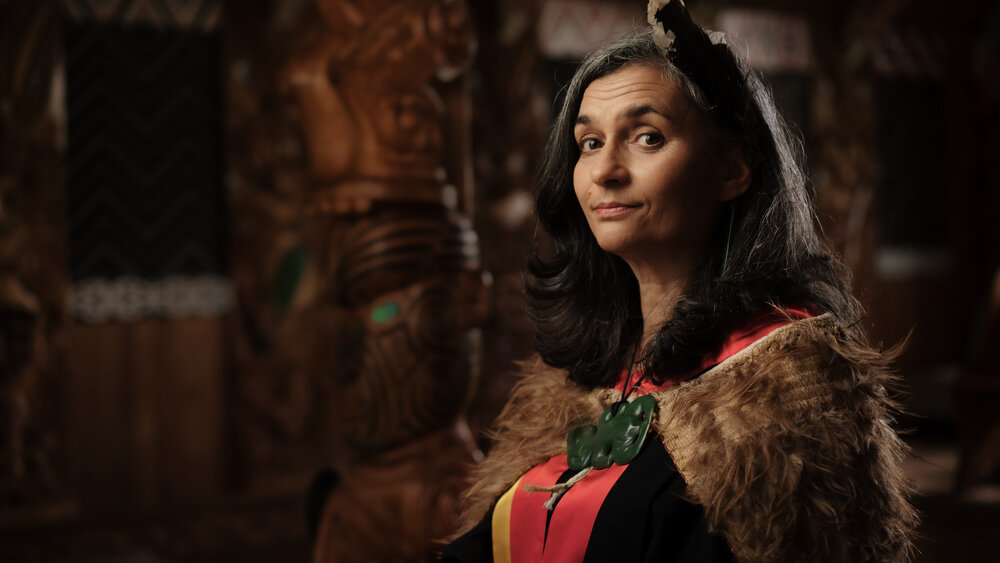
Sheree Trotter, co-founder of ICFI

The Indigenous Coalition for Israel (ICFI) is a New Zealand based organisation that aims to foster a unified indigenous voice in support of Israel, both domestically and globally, by promoting education and cultural engagement. It was founded in 2021 by former cabinet minister Alfred Ngaro and academic Sheree Trotter. The organization characterizes itself as "an international Christian initiative".

== Mission ==
ICFI aims to address the underrepresentation of indigenous supporters for Israel in the prevailing cultural discourse, aiming to educate on the Israeli–Palestinian conflict. ICFI seeks to change the perception of Israel among Māori and Pasifika communities to create greater understanding and to address the lack of an official Māori or indigenous entity to represent a pro-Israel stance.

ICFI uses various platforms to communicate their message, including its website, articles, newsletters, videos, social media and face-to-face engagement.

== People ==
Sheree Trotter, co-founder of ICFI, is an academic and researcher who writes on rising antisemitism in Western-style democracies. Trotter earned her PhD in History at the University of Auckland and her thesis was on Zionism in New Zealand. Trotter is a Māori Te Arawa indigenous person from New Zealand and believes there is a misconception that Jews are colonisers in Israel. Through her work with ICFI she emphasises the Jewish historical connection to Israel.

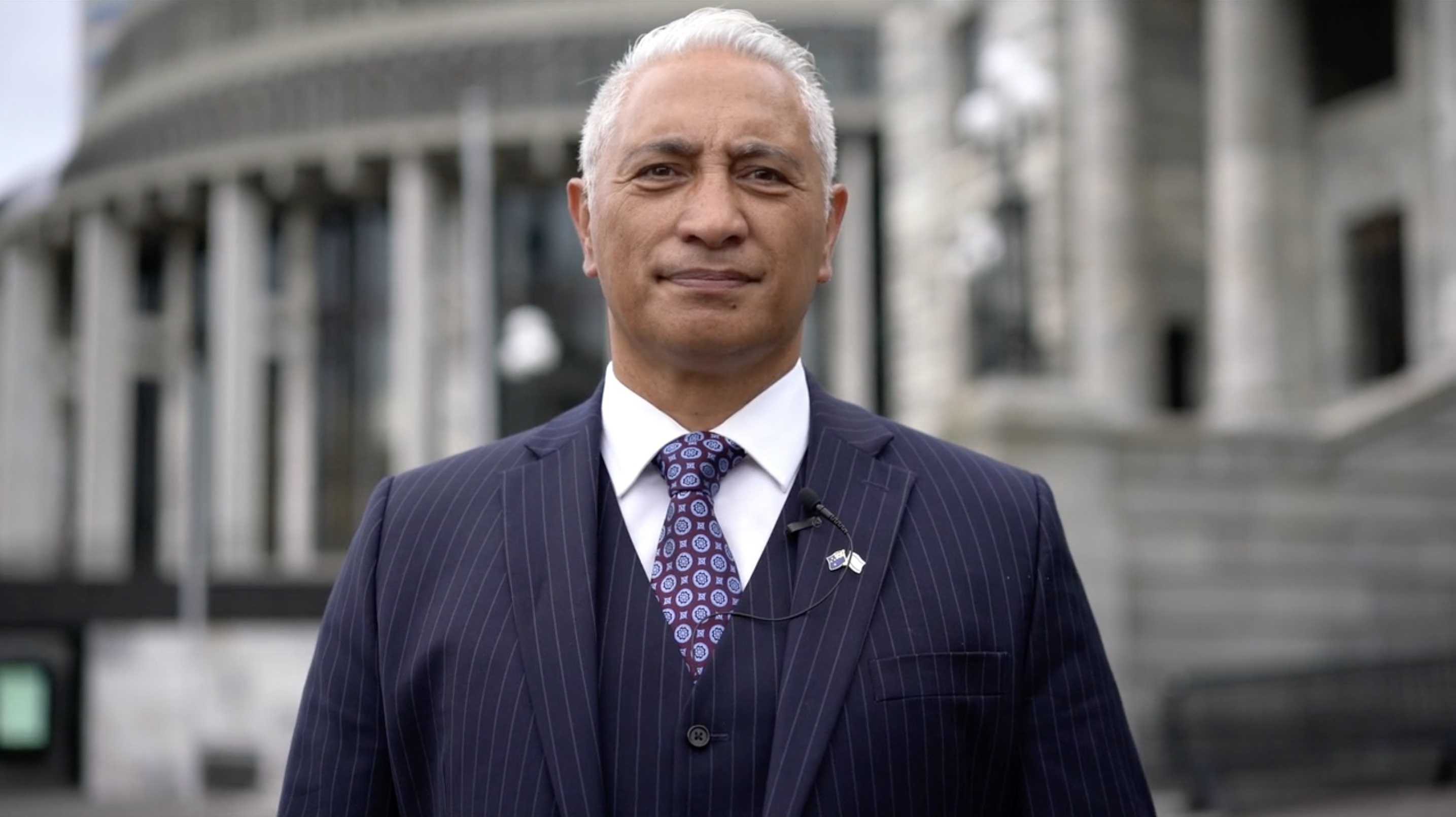
Alfred Ngaro, co-founder ICFI

Alfred Ngaro, co-founder of ICFI and former Cabinet of New Zealand government minister, has stated that he is a Zionist and supports the Jewish people in the "Land of Israel". He reflects on his Jewish grandmother, who came to the Cook Islands, and describes himself as a Cook Islander, Polynesian by birth and Jewish by descent.

== Activities ==
In April 2023, ICFI supported a press statement alongside several other organizations condemning the rocket attacks fired from Gaza and Southern Lebanon into Israel, and called on the New Zealand government to do the same.

In December 2023, ICFI criticized a petition with 5000 signatories entitled the "Māori Call for Palestine" which urged the New Zealand government to intensify its support for Palestinians in the Gaza war. The petition included measures such as expelling the New Zealand-based Israeli ambassador until a ceasefire is reached and imposing economic sanctions on businesses linked with Israel's military actions. In addition, the petition accuses Israel of genocide, apartheid and occupation which Trotter, as spokesperson for ICFI, deemed "problematic" and "deeply misguided". Trotter is quoted as saying, "...it doesn’t really show a recognition or understanding of the geopolitics of the region or the history of the region. It throws around some pretty provocative terms that I would challenge as being incorrect and I think it fails to recognise what Israel is dealing with with Hamas.”

=== Indigenous People Embassy in Jerusalem ===
In 1999, Chief Lynda Prince, of the Nak'azdli Band in British Columbia, Canada proposed the establishment of an embassy for Indigenous peoples in Jerusalem, in a speech to the Knesset.

In 2024, the Indigenous Coalition For Israel initiated the creation of what it called the "first-ever Indigenous People Embassy in Jerusalem", located on the Friends of Zion Museum campus. This project, recognized by the Israeli Foreign Ministry as the 100th embassy in the State of Israel, aims to modify the narrative among indigenous peoples worldwide, emphasizing the ancestral connections indigenous groups have to their lands and resources. It seeks to acknowledge the social and cultural distinctions that define indigenous populations across the globe.

The project's participants are largely unified by Christian beliefs in the Biblical importance of Israel, and some acknowledge that their pro-Israel positions do not reflect the majority opinions of their indigenous communities back home. However, the group's membership is open to people of all religions.

The Jerusalem Post reported that the establishment of the embassy received support from unspecified indigenous leaders, including "several tribal chiefs, a princess, and a king", from various parts of the world including Singapore, Taiwan, Samoa, American Samoa, Hawaii, Tahiti, New Caledonia, Solomon Islands, Australia, Papua New Guinea, Cook Islands, Tonga, Fiji, North America, and South Africa. Jerusalem Deputy Mayor Fleur Hassan-Nahoum stated that indigenous peoples, with their intrinsic connections to their territories, are well-positioned to counter narratives that aim to disconnect the Jewish people from their ancestral lands.

=== Canada ===
Representatives from the Indigenous Coalition including Sheree Trotter marched in the 2024 and 2025 Walk With Israel, run by the Toronto United Jewish Appeal Federation.

In May 2024, following the firebombing of Congregation Schara Tzedeck in Vancouver, Chief Lynda Prince published support for the community through the embassy. Harry Laforme and Karen Restoule have described themselves as Anishinaabe Zionists, and further noted that Indigenous peoples welcomed the settlers to Turtle Island and the original relationship was based upon mutual respect, honour, equality, peaceful coexistence.

== See also ==
- Indigeneity in the Israeli-Palestinian conflict
