= Minister for Pacific Peoples =

New Zealand minister of the Crown

Minister for Pacific Peoples of New Zealand
- Coat of Arms of New Zealand

- Flag of New Zealand

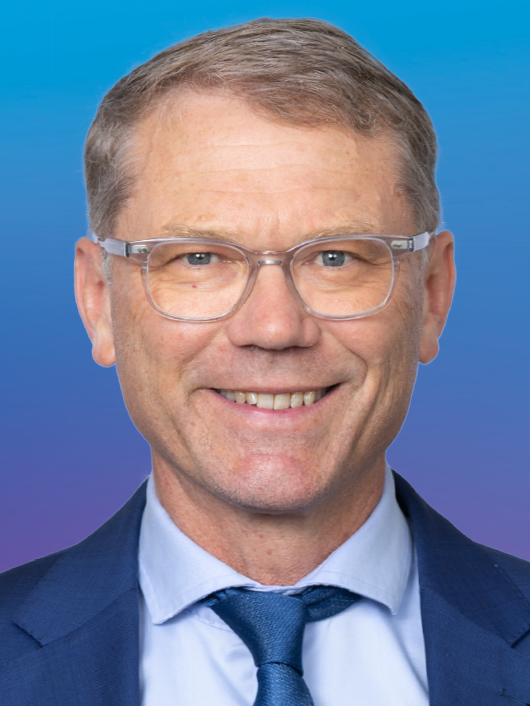
- Incumbent; Paul Goldsmith since 7 April 2026
- Ministry for Pacific Peoples
- Style: The Honourable
- Member of: Cabinet of New Zealand; Executive Council
- Reports to: Prime Minister of New Zealand
- Appointer: Governor-General of New Zealand
- Term length: At His Majesty's pleasure
- Formation: 26 July 1984
- First holder: Richard Prebble
- Salary: $288,900
- Website: www.beehive.govt.nz

The minister for Pacific Peoples is a minister in the New Zealand Government with responsibility over the Ministry for Pacific Peoples. The role was established in 1984 as minister of Pacific Island affairs, prior to which, Pacific Island affairs had been within the purview of the Minister of Foreign Affairs. The position was renamed Minister for Pacific Peoples on 22 December 2015.

The current minister is Paul Goldsmith.

== List of ministers ==
The following ministers have held the office of Minister for Pacific Peoples.

Key

Labour National Te Tawharau

| No. | Name | Portrait | Term of office | | Prime Minister |
|---|---|---|---|---|---|
| 1 | Richard Prebble | | 1 August 1987 | 25 August 1988 | Lange |
| 2 | Russell Marshall | | 6 September 1988 | 12 December 1989 | Lange |
| 2 | Russell Marshall | | 6 September 1988 | 12 December 1989 | Palmer |
| (1) | Richard Prebble | | 4 February 1990 | 2 November 1990 | Palmer |
| (1) | Richard Prebble | | 4 February 1990 | 2 November 1990 | Moore |
| 3 | Bill Birch | | 2 November 1990 | 22 August 1991 | Bolger |
| 4 | Don McKinnon | | 24 September 1991 | 13 August 1998 | Bolger |
| 4 | Don McKinnon | | 24 September 1991 | 13 August 1998 | Shipley |
| 5 | Tuariki Delamere | | 18 August 1998 | 10 December 1999 | Shipley |
| 6 | Mark Gosche | | 10 December 1999 | 12 May 2003 | Clark |
| 7 | Phil Goff | | 19 May 2003 | 5 November 2007 | Clark |
| 8 | Winnie Laban | | 5 November 2007 | 19 November 2008 | Clark |
| 9 | Georgina te Heuheu | | 19 November 2008 | 14 December 2011 | Key |
| 10 | Hekia Parata | | 14 December 2011 | 27 January 2014 | Key |
| 11 | Sam Lotu-Iiga | | 28 January 2014 | 20 December 2016 | Key |
| 12 | Alfred Ngaro | | 20 December 2016 | 26 October 2017 | Key |
| 12 | Alfred Ngaro | | 20 December 2016 | 26 October 2017 | English |
| 13 | William Sio | | 26 October 2017 | 1 February 2023 | Ardern |
| 13 | William Sio | | 26 October 2017 | 1 February 2023 | Hipkins |
| 14 | Barbara Edmonds | | 1 February 2023 | 27 November 2023 | Hipkins |
| 15 | Shane Reti | | 27 November 2023 | 7 April 2026 | Luxon |
| 15 | Paul Goldsmith | | 7 April 2026 | present | Luxon |

== See also ==
- Department of Island Territories
