= Barbara Edmonds =

New Zealand politician

The Honourable Barbara Edmonds MP
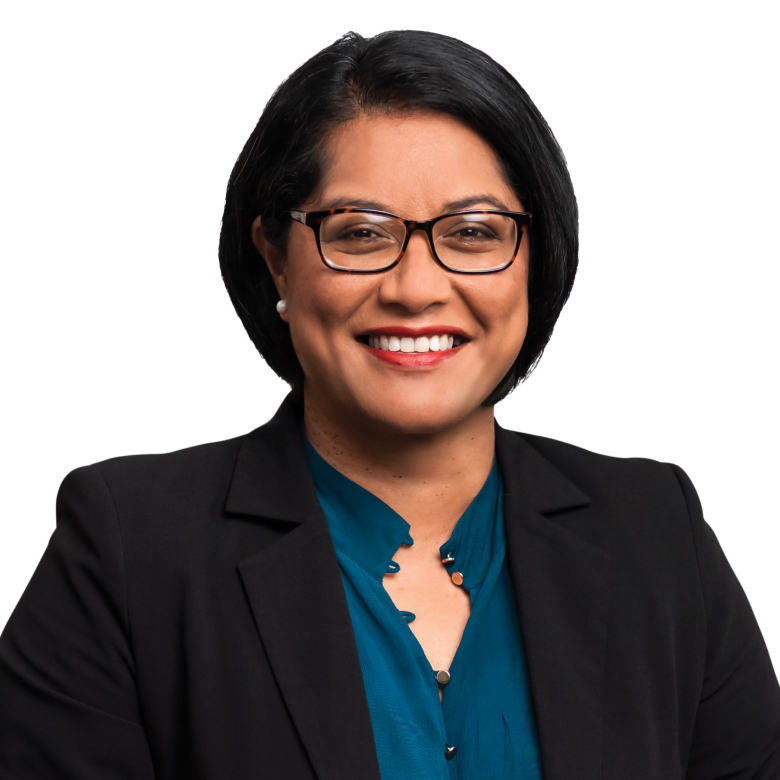
- Edmonds in 2023

37th Minister of Internal Affairs
- In office 1 February 2023 – 27 November 2023
- Prime Minister: Chris Hipkins
- Preceded by: Jan Tinetti
- Succeeded by: Brooke van Velden

14th Minister for Pacific Peoples
- In office 1 February 2023 – 27 November 2023
- Prime Minister: Chris Hipkins
- Preceded by: William Sio
- Succeeded by: Shane Reti

10th Minister for Economic Development
- In office 12 April 2023 – 27 November 2023
- Prime Minister: Chris Hipkins
- Preceded by: Megan Woods (acting)
- Succeeded by: Melissa Lee

Member of the New Zealand Parliament for Mana
- Incumbent
- Assumed office 17 October 2020
- Preceded by: Kris Faafoi

Personal details
- Born: Rachael Fati Poe; 1981 (age 44–45) Auckland, New Zealand
- Party: Labour
- Spouse: Chris Edmonds
- Children: 8

Barbara Rachael Fati Palepa Edmonds (born 1981) is a New Zealand politician. She was elected as the member of the New Zealand Parliament for Mana, representing the Labour Party, in 2020. She served as the minister of internal affairs, minister for Pacific Peoples, minister of revenue and minister for economic development in the final year of the Sixth Labour Government.

== Early life and career ==
Edmonds was born Rachael Fati Poe, in North Shore, Auckland, to parents Selani (Fale’ula, Faleatiu) and Palepa (Safotu, Fasito’o) who had immigrated from Western Samoa in 1978. Her mother died from cancer when she was four years old and Edmonds inherited her name Palepa (Barbara) on her fifth birthday. Her father, previously a naval administrator, left his job to care for his children. Edmonds' first language is Samoan and she did not speak English fluently until she began primary school.

Edmonds was educated at Carmel College, where she was head girl in 1998. Her school was next door to North Shore Hospital where members of her family were working in the kitchen, laundry and as cleaners. After a period studying physiotherapy and working for a private insurance company, she graduated with a conjoint degree of a Bachelor of Laws and Bachelor of Arts from the University of Auckland in 2008. She married Chris Edmonds, whom she met at age 16 and with whom she shares eight children. Edmonds was a parent elected member of the Board of Trustees of Mana College.

Edmonds is a specialist tax lawyer, and before entering Parliament, worked in both the private and public sectors. In 2016, she was seconded from Inland Revenue Department to work as a private secretary to Michael Woodhouse and Judith Collins, as National Party Ministers of Revenue. In 2017, she was appointed as a political adviser to Labour's revenue and police minister Stuart Nash. She received praise for her work on the Arms (Prohibited Firearms, Magazines, and Parts) Amendment Bill, which was passed following the 2019 Christchurch mosque shootings.

== Member of Parliament ==
=== First term, 2020–2023 ===
New Zealand Parliament
Years	Term	Electorate	List	Party
2020–2023	53rd	Mana	49	Labour
2023–2026	54th	Mana	18	Labour
2026–present	55th	Kenepuru	3	Labour

In May 2020, Edmonds was selected as Labour's candidate in Mana, replacing incumbent Kris Faafoi. In August 2020, Edmonds was ranked 49th on the Labour Party's list for the 2020 general election.

During the 2020 election, she won Mana by a large margin of 16,244, defeating National candidate Jo Hayes. Following the election, she was appointed as Labour's associate whip on 2 November. She was deputy chair of the Finance and Expenditure Committee from 3 December 2020 to 22 June 2022, when she became chair. As a first-term member of Parliament, Edmonds attracted praise from National Party leader Christopher Luxon, who complimented her select committee work and described her as "very, very smart [and] very, very considered." In late 2022, New Zealand Herald journalist Audrey Young ranked her second highest of the 42 new MPs who entered Parliament in 2020.

In a cabinet reshuffle by new Prime Minister Chris Hipkins on 31 January 2023 Edmonds was promoted into Cabinet and appointed as Minister of Internal Affairs and Minister for Pacific Peoples, as well as Associate Minister of Health (Pacific Peoples) and Associate Minister of Housing. She additionally became Associate Minister for Cyclone Recovery on 24 February 2023, Minister for Economic Development on 12 April 2023 after the dismissal of Stuart Nash, Minister of Revenue on 24 July 2023 after the resignation of David Parker, and Associate Minister of Finance after the resignation of Kiri Allan.

In the internal affairs portfolio, Edmonds oversaw the completion of upgrades at 26 fire stations. As economic development minister, Edmonds led the first all-female trade delegation to Australia in Australia 2023, featuring 26 female business leaders. Also in August 2023, as associate housing minister, she launched consultation on retirement village policies. With finance minister Grant Robertson, Edmonds announced a new tax on multinational companies that provide digital services in New Zealand.

=== Second term, 2023–2026 ===
After being re-selected as Labour's Mana candidate for the 2023 general election, she won an election night majority of 7,324 votes over the National Party candidate Frances Hughes.

On 30 November, she became spokesperson for economic development, infrastructure and associate finance in the Shadow Cabinet of Chris Hipkins. On 5 December 2023, Edmonds was granted retention of the title The Honourable, in recognition of her term as a member of the Executive Council.

Following the resignation of Grant Robertson in mid February 2024, Edmonds assumed the finance portfolio during a shadow cabinet reshuffle.

Following a cabinet reshuffle in early March 2025, Edmonds became part of a new leadership team focusing on the economy. She retained the finance and economy portfolio, gained the savings and investment portfolio, and relinquished the infrastructure portfolio.

On 24 May 2026, The New Zealand Herald obtained a leaked audio clip of Edmonds calling National Party MP and Finance Minister Nicola Willis a "duck-faced horse" during a Labour Party meeting over the weekend. When approached by the Herald, Edmonds apologised for causing offence. The following day, Labour leader Chris Hipkins said that Edmonds was right to apologise for her remark about Willis. Willis also accepted Edmonds' apology.

=== Third term, 2026–present ===
During the 2026 New Zealand general election, Edmonds was ranked third on the Labour Party list. She contested the Kenepuru electorate. On 7 November, Edmonds retained Kenepuru by a margin of 9,297 votes based on preliminary results.

New Zealand Parliament
Preceded by Kris Faafoi	Member of Parliament for Mana; 2020–2023	Incumbent
Political offices
Preceded by Jan Tinetti	Minister of Internal Affairs; 2023	Succeeded by Brooke van Velden
Preceded by William Sio	Minister for Pacific Peoples; 2023	Succeeded by Shane Reti
Preceded by Stuart Nash	Minister for Economic Development; 2023	Succeeded by Melissa Lee
