= Israel Day on Fifth =

Annual parade in support of Israel in New York City

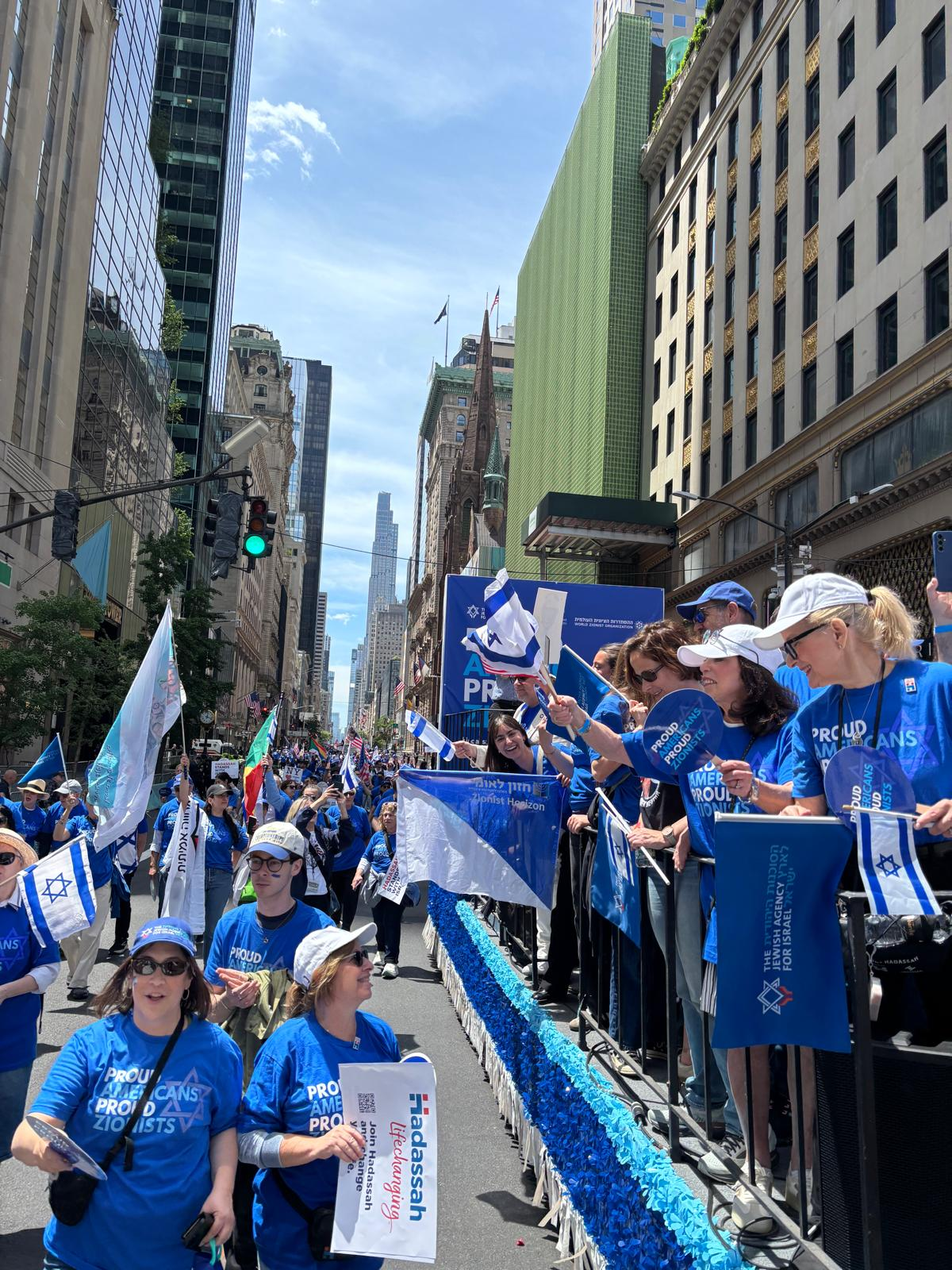
- Genre: parade
- Frequency: annually
- Location: New York City
- Country: United States
- Inaugurated: 1964
- Website: israeldayon5th.com

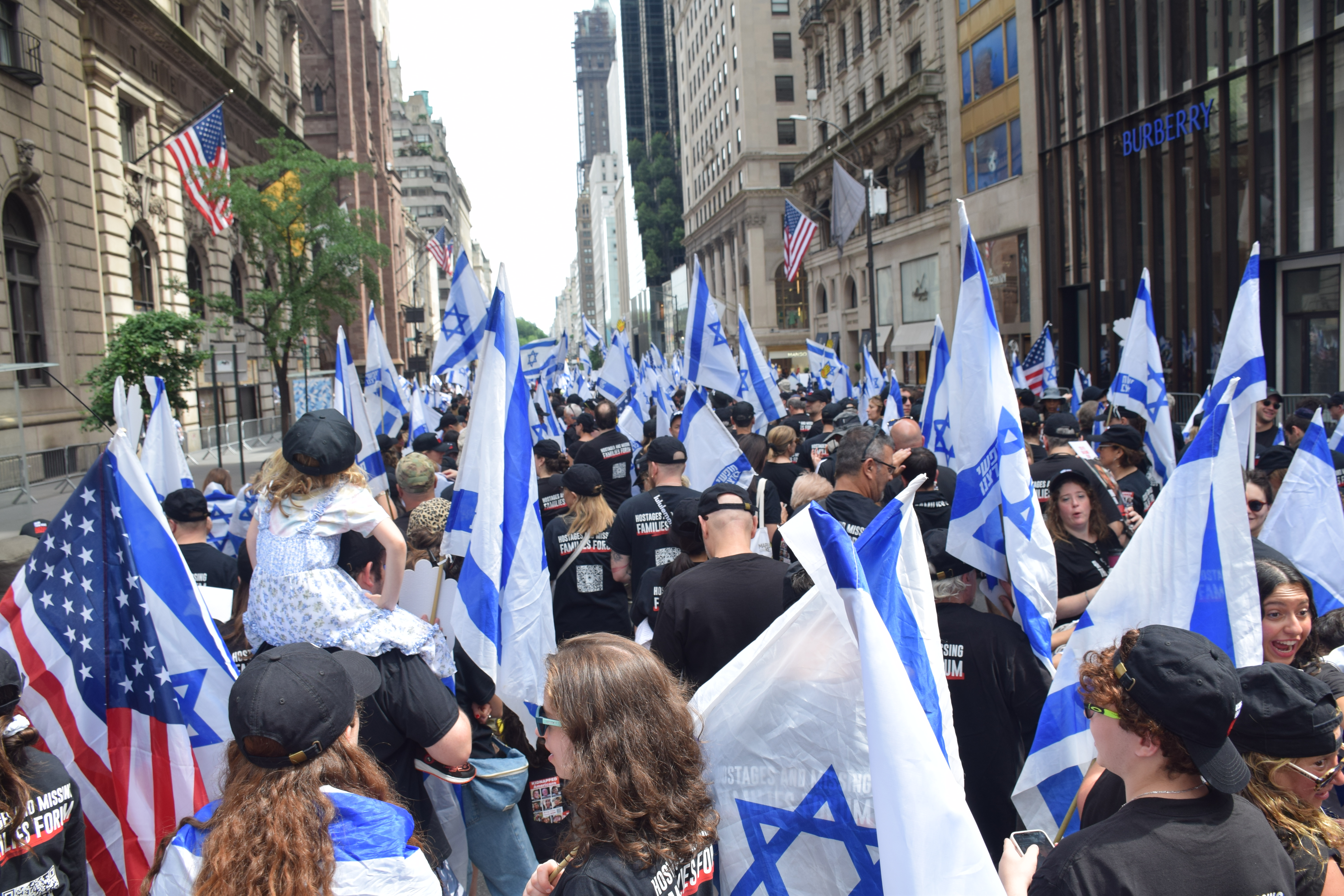
2024 parade

Israel Day on Fifth (formerly the Salute to Israel Parade and then the Celebrate Israel Parade) is an annual parade in support of Israel that takes place on Fifth Avenue alongside Central Park in New York City. The participants come from the New York metropolitan area, as well as other parts of the country, and represent Jewish schools, synagogues, youth groups and other Jewish and Christian organizations.

== History ==
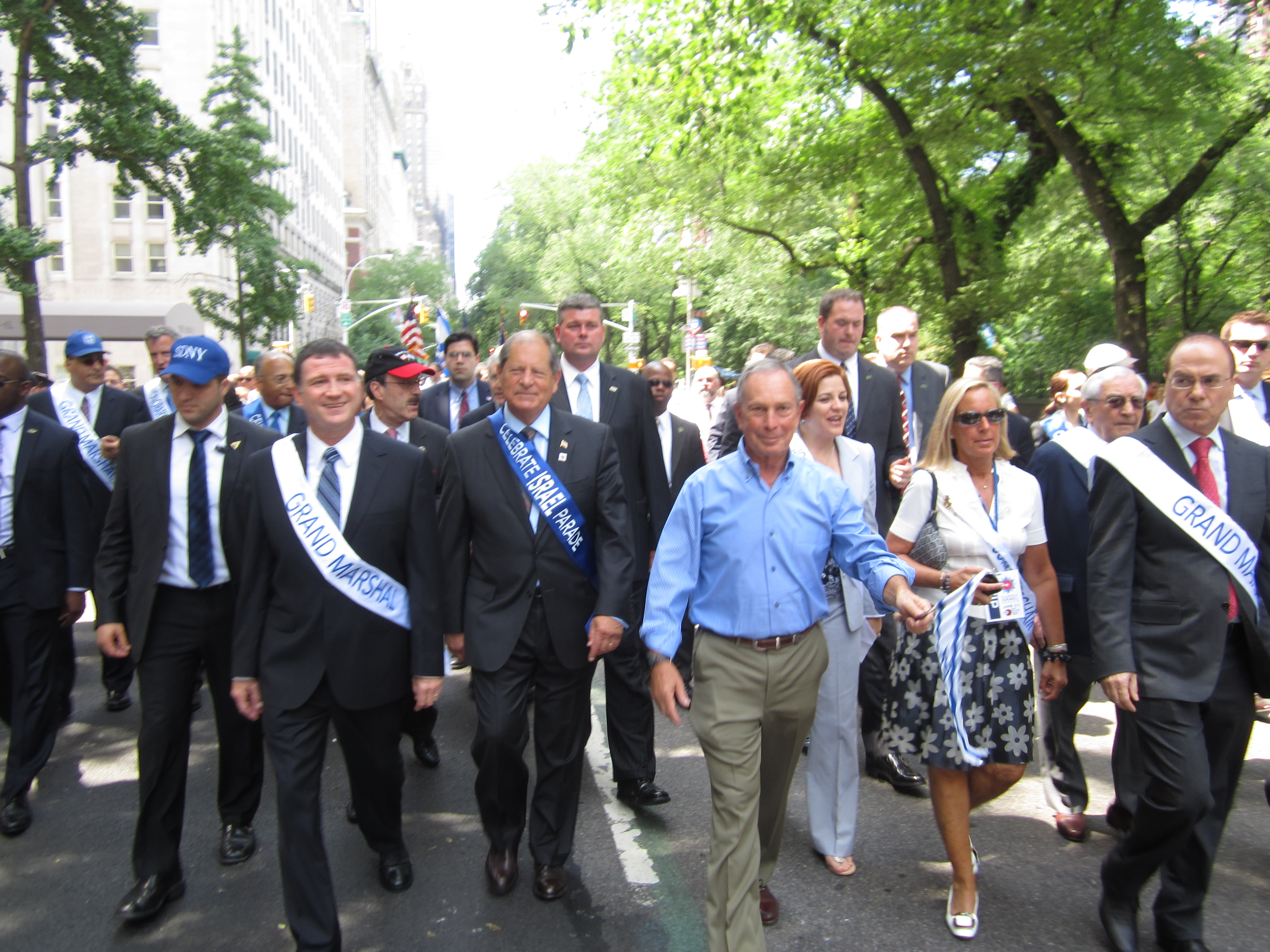
Congressman Bob Turner in the 2012 parade with parade Grand Marshalls. From left: Israeli cabinet minister Yuli Edelstein; Turner; New York mayor Michael Bloomberg; a parade co-chair; Israeli cabinet minister Silvan Shalom

In 1964 pro-Israel activists planned a demonstration of American Jewish solidarity with Israel. They coordinated with the Manhattan Day School to march from the school to a theater on Broadway, a march known as the Youth Salute to Israel Parade.

In 1965, the first "Salute to Israel" parade was held. The marcher started on East 72nd Street and turned on Fifth Avenue, concluding with a rally in Central Park. Mayor Robert F. Wagner Jr. addressed the crowd.

In 1971, more than 150,000 spectators and 75,000 marchers attended the annual event. Participants marched with shackled wrists held high to highlight the plight of the Jews in Russia.

In 1977, an estimated 300,000 spectators attended as 75,000 participants marched from 57th Street up Fifth Avenue and across 86th Street. The theme of the 1977 parade was "If I forget thee, O Jerusalem," to commemorate the anniversary of taking back Jerusalem after the Six-Day War of 1967.

In 1979, celebration of the Israeli-Egyptian peace treaty was an underlying theme of the 15th annual Salute to Israel Parade.

In 2011, the Jewish Community Relations Council of New York assumed management of the parade, which was renamed the Celebrate Israel Parade.

In 2024, the parade was renamed Israel Day on Fifth (IDO5).

In 2026, Mayor Zohran Mamdani, citing his opposition to the Israeli government during the Gaza war did not march, becoming the first mayor in the parade's history not to participate. Jessica Tisch, chief of the New York City Police Department served as the grand marshal of the 2026 parade.

== Gallery ==
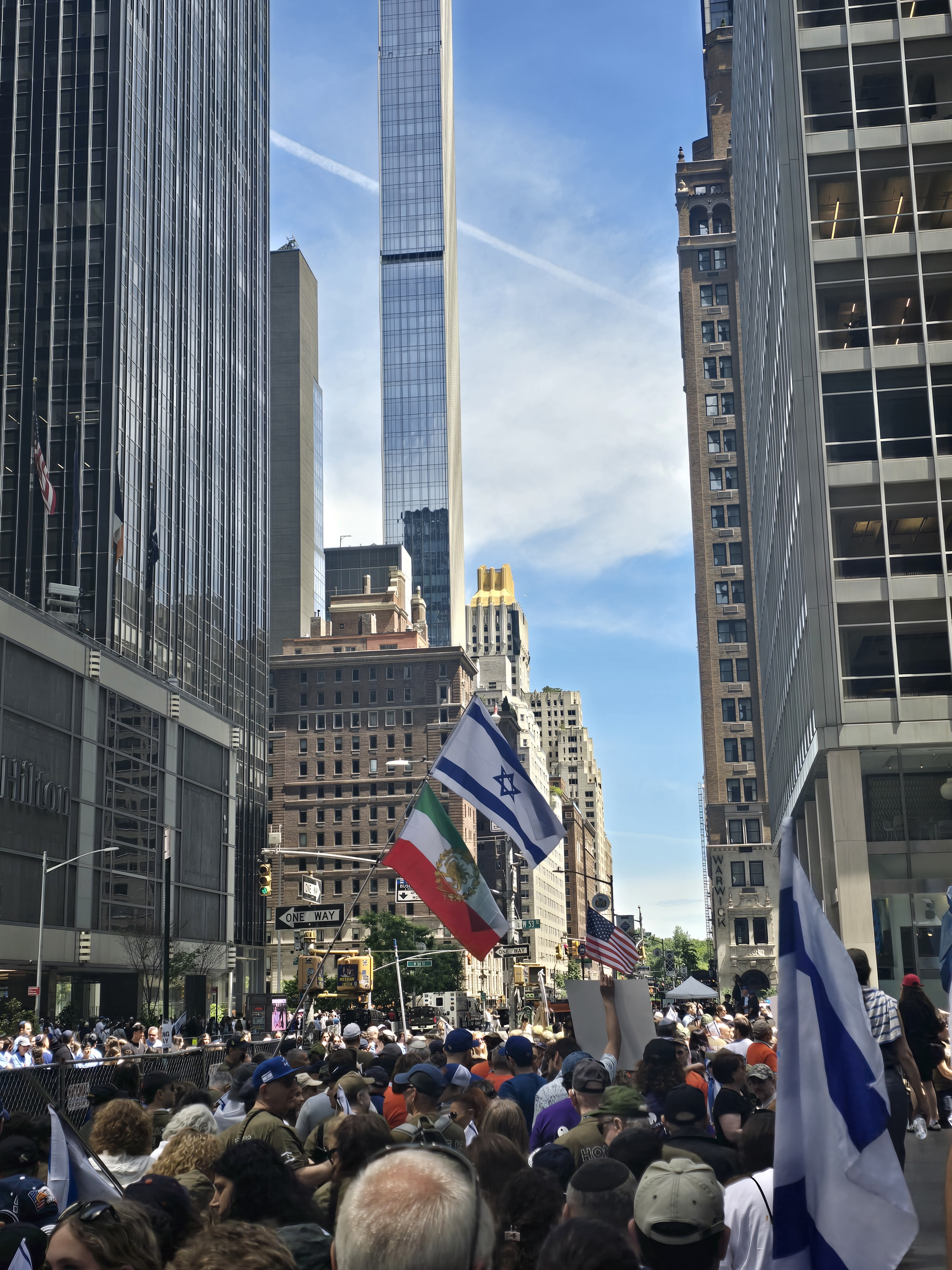
Israeli, US and Iranian flags at the 2026 march

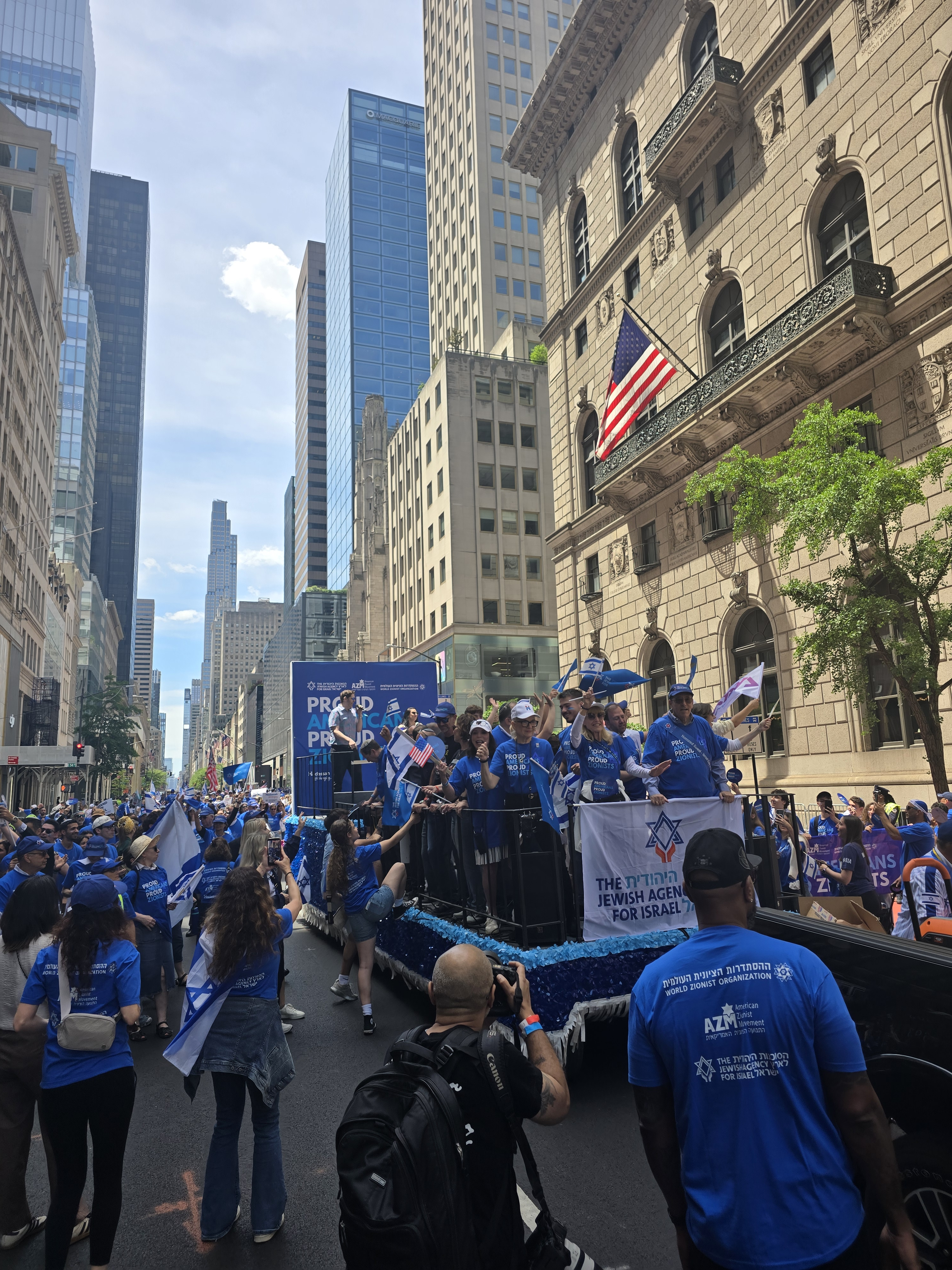
Jewish Agency float in the 2026 parade

== List of parades ==
| Year | Date | Theme | Marchers | Notes |
|---|---|---|---|---|
| 1964 | | | | Original Youth Salute to Israel Parade by Manhattan Day School |
| 1965 | May 2 | | | |
| 1966 | | | | |
| 1967 | | | | Shortly before the Six-Day War, drew a quarter-million people |
| 1973 | May 6 | | | |
| 1974 | June 9 | | | |
| 1975 | May 11 | | | |
| 1976 | June 13 | Proclaim Liberty Throughout All the Land | | Dignitaries who attended Mayor Beame; Gov. Brendan Byrne of New Jersey: Lt. Gov. Mary Anne Krupsak: State Controller Arthur Levitt; State Attorney General Louis Lefkowitz and U.S. Senators Clifford Case of New Jersey and Jacob K. Javits of New York. |
| 1977 | | If I forget thee, O Jerusalem," to commemorate the anniversary of taking back Jerusalem after the Six-Day War | 75,000 | 300,000 spectators |
| 1979 | | Israeli-Egyptian peace treaty | | |
| 1995 | May 21 | | | |
| 2001 | May 20 | | | Amid the Second Intifada. |
| 2002 | | | 100,000 | 750,000 spectators |
| 2011 | June 5 | | | Celebrate Israel Parade was renamed from Salute to Israel Parade |
| 2012 | June 3 | Israel Branches Out… | 35,000 | First contingent of LGBT marchers. |
| 2013 | June 2 | Picture Israel; The Art & the Craft | 35,000 | |
| 2014 | June 1 | 50 Reasons to Celebrate Israel | 35,000 | |
| 2015 | June 10 | Israel Imagines | 40,000 | Knesset members Avraham Naguise, Yoav Ben-Tzur, Revital Swid, Ksenia Svetlova and Ofir Akunis led the parade with New York Mayor Bill de Blasio. |
| 2016 | June 5 | Sight, Sound & Spirit | 30,000 | Andrew Cuomo announced the signing of Executive Order 157, barring the BDS Movement |
| 2017 | June 4 | Celebrate Israel Together | 40,000 | Opera star David Serero performed the U.S and Israel anthems for the opening of the parade. Andrew Cuomo prior to the parade officially declared it Shimon Peres Day. |
| 2018 | June 3 | 70 and Sababa! (70 & Awesome!) | 50,000 | |
| 2019 | June 2 | Only in Israel – Rak B’Yisrael | 40,000 | Theodore Comet, one of the creators of the parade, marched in the 2019 parade, marking the 55th anniversary of the parade. Comet was 95 at the time. |
| 2020 | | | | Cancelled due to COVID |
| 2021 | | | | Virtual celebration held due to COVID |
| 2022 | May 22 | Together Again – Kulanu B’Yachad | 40,000 | |
| 2023 | June 4 | Israel 75 | 40,000+ | |
| 2024 | June 2 | One People, One Heart | 50,000+ | Eden Golan was among the high-profile participants. |
| 2025 | May 18 | Hatikvah | 40,000+ | Zusha and six of the released Gaza hostages were among the high-profile participants. |
| 2026 | May 31 | Proud Americans, Proud Zionists | 50,000+ | American Muslim & Multifaith Women’s Empowerment Council attended as the first Muslim participating organization. Zohran Mamdani did not attend, the first for a mayor in the parade's history. |

== See also ==
- Walk With Israel
