= William Sio =

New Zealand politician

The Honourable Aupito William Sio
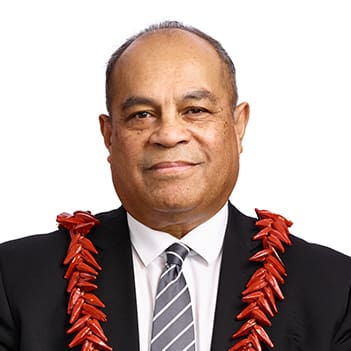
- Sio in 2020

10th Minister for Courts
- In office 6 November 2020 – 1 February 2023
- Prime Minister: Jacinda Ardern; Chris Hipkins
- Preceded by: Andrew Little
- Succeeded by: Rino Tirikatene

13th Minister for Pacific Peoples
- In office 26 October 2017 – 1 February 2023
- Prime Minister: Jacinda Ardern; Chris Hipkins
- Preceded by: Alfred Ngaro
- Succeeded by: Barbara Edmonds

Member of the New Zealand Parliament for Māngere
- In office 8 November 2008 – 14 October 2023
- Preceded by: Taito Phillip Field
- Succeeded by: Lemauga Lydia Sosene

Member of the New Zealand Parliament for Labour party list
- In office 31 March 2008 – 8 November 2008
- Preceded by: Dianne Yates (Note: Normally, list MPs do not have individual predecessors or successors, but Yates resigned during a sitting parliament and therefore was succeeded by Sio.)

Personal details
- Born: 1960 (age 65–66) Samoa
- Party: Labour
- Education: Brigham Young University; Carrington Polytechnic Institute
- Website: www.labour.org.nz/aupitowilliamsio

Aupito Tofae Su'a William Sio (born 1960) is a politician who became a member of the New Zealand House of Representatives on 1 April 2008 for the Labour Party as a list MP. From the November 2008 election to 2023, he represented the Māngere electorate.

== Personal life ==
Sio is a Samoan who was born in Samoa and came to New Zealand in 1969. He has the matai (chieftain title) of Aupito from the Matatufu village of the Lotofaga district on the island of Upolu. He belongs to the extended family called Aiga Sa Aupito, which he now heads, as his father, Aupito Pupu Sio, bestowed the title in a 'fa'aui le ula' from father to son. Sio is a Mormon and has served as one of their bishops. He is married with a family of adult and young children.

While growing up in New Zealand during the 1970s, Sio and his family experienced a police dawn raid, which disproportionately targeted members of the Pasifika communities. Sio recalled that he was personally traumatised by the raid and that his father, who had recently bought the house, was helpless.

== Local politics ==
Sio served as a Manukau City Councillor, representing the Ōtara ward from 2001. Sir Barry Curtis, the Mayor of Manukau City, selected Sio as chair of the planning committee in November 2004. In October 2007, the newly elected Mayor of Manukau City, Len Brown, appointed Sio deputy mayor, making him the first Pasifika New Zealander to hold the position in Manukau City.

== National politics ==
New Zealand Parliament
Years	Term	Electorate	List	Party
2008	48th	List	47	Labour
2008–2011	49th	Māngere	24	Labour
2011–2014	50th	Māngere	17	Labour
2014–2017	51st	Māngere	14	Labour
2017–2020	52nd	Māngere	16	Labour
2020–2023	53rd	Māngere	20	Labour

=== Labour candidate, 2005–2008 ===
In the 2005 parliamentary election Sio was ranked 47th on the Labour party list and failed to be elected by two places. However Labour Party list MP Dianne Yates left the Parliament on 29 March 2008, and Sio was declared elected in her place (the person above him on the list, Louisa Wall, had already been declared elected to replace Ann Hartley).

Prior to entering Parliament, Sio was a representative on Labour's national council as Pacific Islands Vice-President.

=== In opposition, 2008–2017 ===
In the 2008 general election Sio won the Māngere electorate, defeating the incumbent independent (and former Labour) MP Taito Phillip Field by 7,126 votes. In the 2011 and 2014 elections, Sio's majority was approximately 15,000 votes.

In 2013, Sio voted against the Marriage Amendment Bill, which aimed to permit same sex marriage in New Zealand, with fellow Labour MPs Rino Tirikatene, Ross Robertson and Damien O'Connor, alongside New Zealand First, Brendan Horan (former New Zealand First MP), and 32 National MPs. The Bill passed, becoming law.

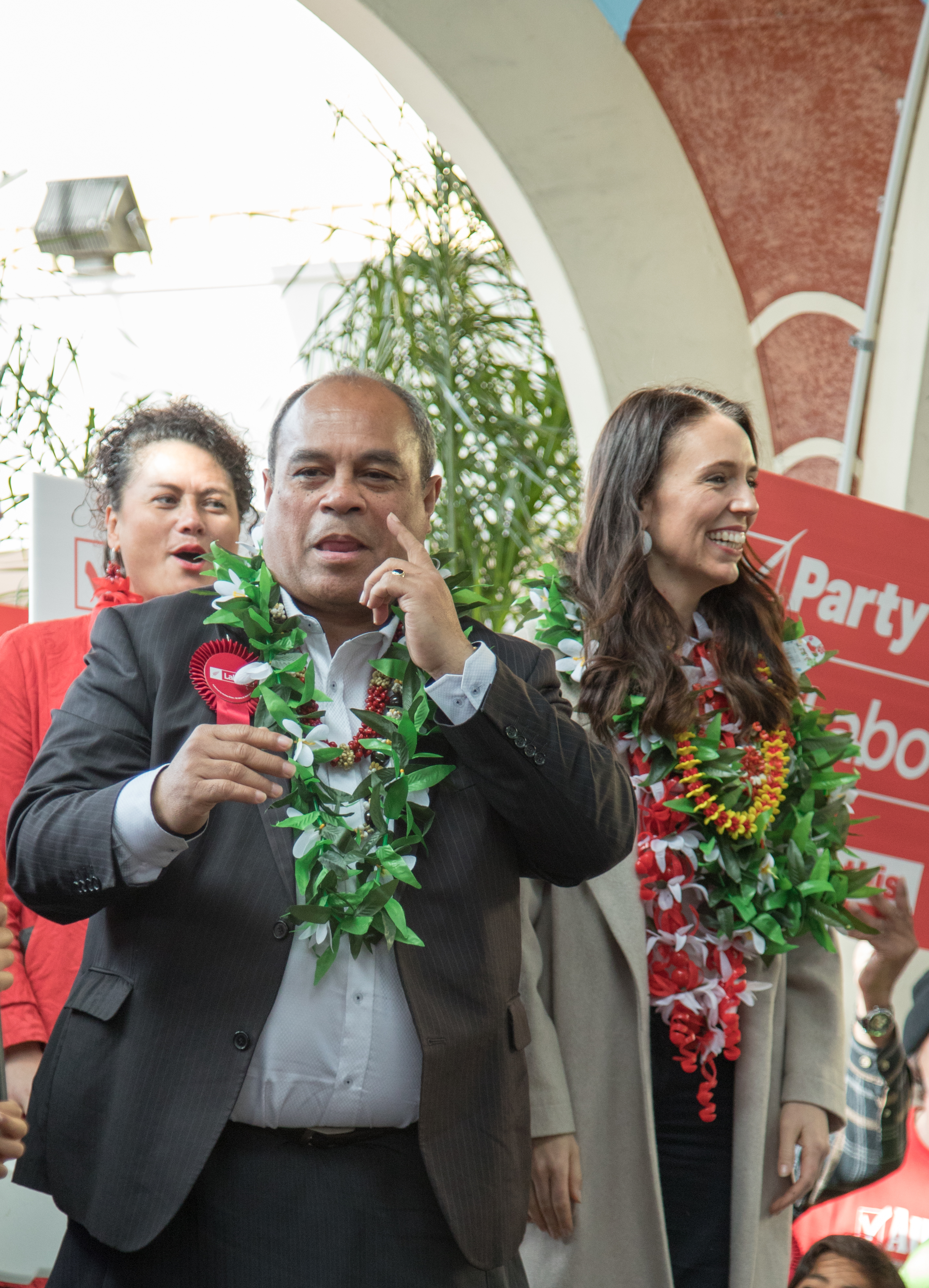
Sio with Labour Party leader Jacinda Ardern in August 2017

=== In government, 2017–2023 ===
Sio was re-elected during the 2017 general election by a margin of 14,597 votes, defeating National Party candidate Agnes Loheni. Following the formation of Labour-led coalition government with New Zealand First and the Greens, Sio was appointed as a Minister outside Cabinet by the Labour Party caucus. On 26 October 2017, Sio was appointed Minister for Pacific Peoples, Associate Minister for Courts, and Associate Minister of Justice.

During the 2020 general election, Sio was re-elected in Māngere by a margin of 19,396 votes, defeating National's candidate Loheni.

In early November, Sio became Minister for Courts, while retaining his Pacific Peoples ministerial portfolio. He also retained his associate justice portfolio while picking up the associate foreign affairs, education (Pacific Peoples), and health (Pacific Peoples) portfolios.

After Prime Minister Jacinda Ardern confirmed that the New Zealand Government would apologise for the Dawn Raids of the 1970s and early 1980s, Sio gave an emotional testimony of his family's experiences with a dawn raid, stating that the apology restored mana for the victims of these raids.

In mid-December 2022, Sio announced that he would not be contesting the 2023 New Zealand general election and would step down at the end of the 2020–2023 term. He attributed his resignation decision to his family and matai (chiefly) responsibilities, stating that his job as a Member of Parliament was "all-consuming and relentless." On 10 February 2023, Sio was granted retention of the title "The Honourable" for life, in recognition of his term as a member of the Executive Council.

== Political views ==
Sio's stance against the Marriage Amendment Act, which allowed same-sex couple to marry, was not popular among his Labour colleagues. He justified his stance based the beliefs of many Pacific Islanders whom he represents.

By 2019 Sio's views on LGBT issues had progressed. He was a supporter of Pasifika Pink Shirt Day 2019 for young people who identify as part of LGBT communities.

In Sio's valedictory statement to New Zealand Parliament on 22 August 2023 he said it is OK to be different. He encouraged Pacific young people to be proud of who they are, that it is OK to be a member of the rainbow community, and that it is OK to use non-binary pronouns.

== Notes ==
New Zealand Parliament
Preceded by Taito Phillip Field	Member of Parliament for Māngere; 2008–2023	Succeeded by Lemauga Lydia Sosene
Political offices
Preceded by Alfred Ngaro	Minister for Pacific Peoples; 2017–2023	Succeeded by Barbara Edmonds
Preceded by Andrew Little	Minister for Courts; 2020–2023	Succeeded by Rino Tirikatene
