= Auckland Committee on Racism and Discrimination =

The Auckland Committee on Racism and Discrimination (ACORD) was a committee based in Auckland that highlighted and challenged racism within the police, justice, and social welfare systems of New Zealand. Established in 1973, the work of ACORD and other related agencies and groups helped in the creation of a national duty solicitor scheme and secured protections for children held in state custody. ACORD worked closely with other activist groups such as Ngā Tamatoa and the Polynesian Panther Party.

== History ==
=== Founding and early work (1973–1978) ===
ACORD was founded in 1973 to promote biculturalism and uncover systemic racial issues in New Zealand’s social infrastructure. It set up the New Perspectives on Race initiative, which consisted of workshops and classes on equality and racism in community groups, places of worship, and government departments. ACORD published a leaflet on violence and racism in 1973, which is available on a government archive.

=== Inquiry into state homes (1978–1979) ===
On 21 February 1979, the Auckland Committee on Racism and Discrimination sent a letter to the Human Rights Commission regarding the methods of venereal disease testing that were used on girls who lived in social welfare residential homes. Alongside the letter, ACORD sent through a report based on an inquiry that they had conducted with Arohanui Incorporated and Nga Tamatoa in June 1978. ACORD proceeded to submit a detailed complaint to the Commission under the basis that “the treatment of children by the Department of Social Welfare in the Bollard Girls’ Home, the Owairaka Boys’ Home and other homes violates the United Nations Covenant of Civil and Political Rights which the New Zealand Government ratified on 28 December 1978.” The Commission held a meeting on 6 April 1979 where they resolved the complaint as a representation ‘affecting human rights’ under the Human Rights Commission Act 1977. They agreed that according to the Parliament, it was their responsibility to take action on the inquiry’s claims. In July 1979, ACORD representatives in Auckland and Wellington met with representatives of the Commission to determine the nature of the procedure of the upcoming inquiry.

The reliability of some allegations was questioned at the time, though over one thousand typewritten pages of evidence were submitted to the Commission. It was alleged that the Girls’ Homes were conducting mandatory internal venereal disease testing, regardless of any individual’s age or sexual activity. According to allegations described in the Commission’s report on the cases, “girls who refused the testing were placed in isolation in secure cells or were denied privileges, particularly the much sought after privilege of working in the kitchen.” A residential social worker at Bollard Girls’ Home described the lack of counselling before the testing, and various other reports were directly collected by ACORD and other involved groups in the investigations.

Inquiries conducted by ACORD and the Human Rights Commission recognised the mistreatment of children in state care, and highlighted the lack of proper counselling and informed consent in testing done in state homes.

ACORD was disbanded in 1980, following the inquiries by itself and the Human Rights Commission into Auckland state care facilities.

== Collaborations ==
ACORD worked alongside other notable organisations involved in New Zealand activism including Ngā Tamatoa and Polynesian Panthers to push their social programmes based in antidiscrimination and equality to a wider audience.

== Legacy and impact ==
ACORD had an important role in raising awareness of institutional racism in New Zealand during the 1970s and early 1980s. The group’s advocacy brought the concept of institutional racism into public view, identifying ignored issues in the social context of New Zealand at the time. The work of founding member Dr Oliver Sutherland, as discussed in his book Justice & Race was particularly influential in early discussions of institutional racism. ACORD’s inquiries into abuse within state homes led to one of the earliest major inquiries into the treatment of children in government custody, which certainly influenced the procedures of the Human Rights Commission in dealing with later instances of abuse and discussion of human rights.

One of ACORD’s most lasting contributions was its advocacy for the establishment of a national duty solicitor scheme, which ensured free legal representation for individuals facing police charges. ACORD also promoted stronger legal safeguards for children held in state care through their inquiries into state homes such as Bollard Girls’ Home and the Owairaka Boys’ Home. Its New Perspectives on Race programme became an early model for anti-racism education, affecting the development of equity and diversity training across both community organisations and government departments of New Zealand.

ACORD has extensive archives of statements, meetings, hearings, and other resources that they created or contributed to, which are important in revisiting past events and setting a precedent in the context of legal matters the committee had contributed to.

== Notable members ==
Dr Oliver Sutherland - A founding member of ACORD who brought the term ‘institutional racism’ into the public eye.

== See also ==
- Ngā Tamatoa
- Polynesian Panthers
- Lake Alice Child and Adolescent Unit
