= Fasito'o Tai =

Village on Upolu Island, Samoa

Coordinates: 13°53′27″S 171°59′15″W

Fasito'o Tai is a village situated on the northwest coast of Upolu Island in Samoa. The village is part of A'ana Alofi 4 Electoral Constituency (Faipule District) which formas part of the larger A'ana political district.

The population of Fasito'o Tai is 1573.

Fasito'o Tai was also the home of the famous London Missionary Society (LMS) missionary John Williams, locally known as Ioane Viliamu. It was the headquarters for the LMS church.
