= Alfred Ngaro =

New Zealand politician

The Honourable Alfred Ngaro
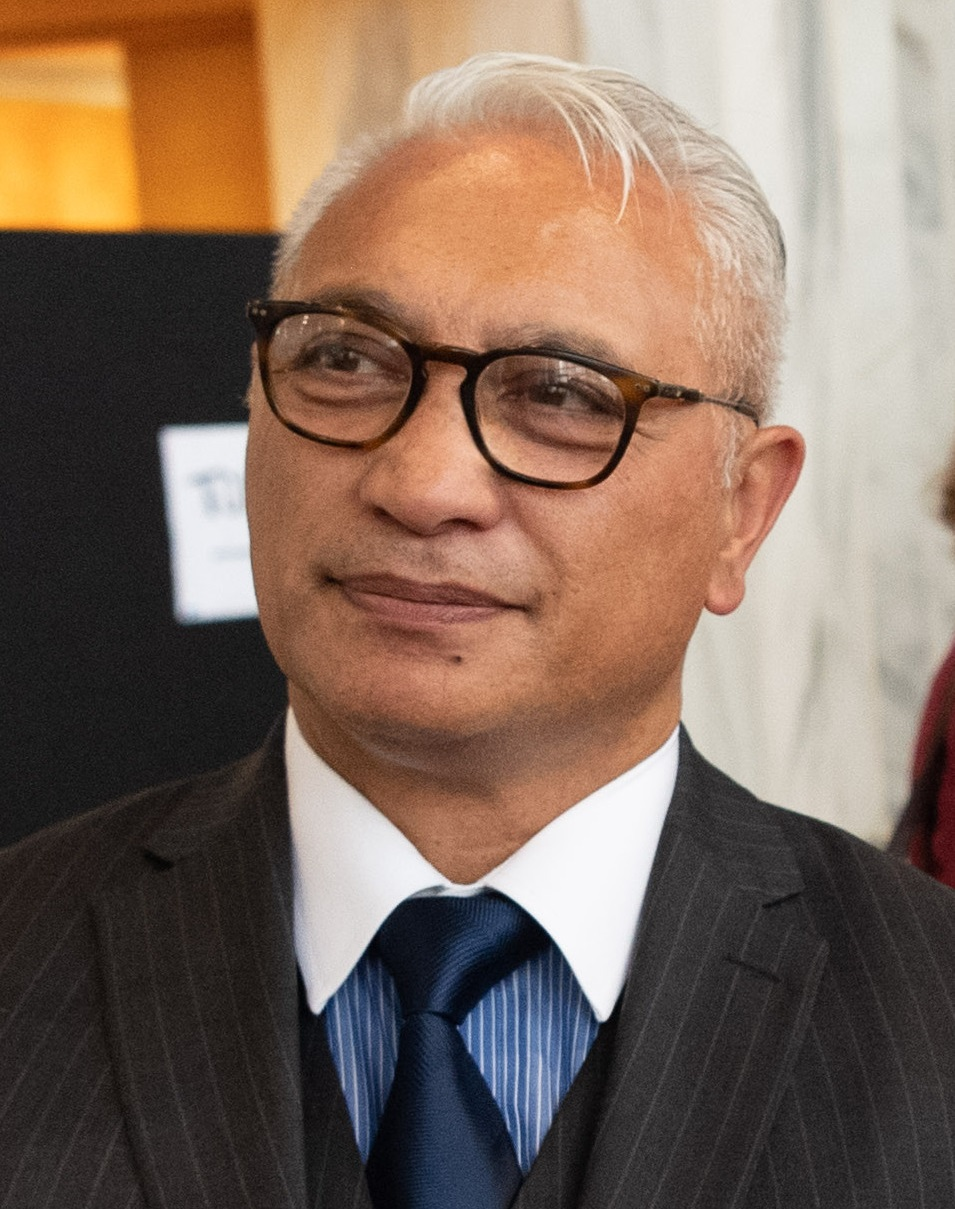
- Alfred Ngaro in 2019

Leader of NewZeal
- In office July 2023 – March 2026

7th Minister for the Community and Voluntary Sector
- In office 20 December 2016 – 26 October 2017
- Prime Minister: Bill English
- Preceded by: Jo Goodhew
- Succeeded by: Peeni Henare

12th Minister for Pacific Peoples
- In office 20 December 2016 – 26 October 2017
- Prime Minister: Bill English
- Preceded by: Sam Lotu-Iiga
- Succeeded by: William Sio

Member of the New Zealand Parliament for National Party list
- In office 30 November 2011 – 17 October 2020

Personal details
- Born: New Zealand
- Party: New Zealand First (since 2026)
- Other political affiliations: NewZeal (2023–2026); National Party (1990–2023)
- Spouse: Mokauina
- Children: 4
- Website: www.alfredngaro.co.nz

Alfred Ngaro is a New Zealand politician, who served as leader of NewZeal from 2023 to 2026. He was a list member of the New Zealand House of Representatives from 2011 to 2020, representing the National Party.

Ngaro is the first New Zealander of Cook Islands descent to be elected to Parliament in New Zealand. He was Minister for Pacific Peoples and Minister for the Community and Voluntary Sector in the final year of the Fifth National Government of New Zealand.

He was later elected leader of the socially conservative New Zeal party in July 2023, and unsuccessfully stood as a list candidate at the subsequent general election. In March 2026 Ngaro was introduced as a New Zealand First candidate for the 2026 New Zealand general election.

== Early life ==
Ngaro was raised in Te Atatū and attended the local schools of Edmonton Primary, Rangeview Intermediate and Henderson High School. Both his parents came from the Cook Islands. Ngaro's father, Daniel Ngaro, is from Aitutaki and Pukapuka, and was a union delegate. The family have a long tradition of voting for the Labour Party. His mother, Toko Kirianu, is from Mangaia. His parents worked hard, his mother as a cleaner and his father as a labourer, to give Ngaro and his siblings education and training opportunities.

Ngaro's grandmother, Rita Goldstein, is of both Cook Island and Jewish descent, her father being of Polish-Jewish ancestry. Ngaro has described himself as "Polynesian by birth and Jewish by descent". His wife Mokauina is of Samoan-Niuean descent. They have four children: three boys and one girl.

He trained and qualified as an electrician and also completed his theological degree at the Henderson campus of the Bible College of New Zealand (now Laidlaw College). Prior to entering Parliament, Ngaro was a consultant in community-led development and governance with expertise in New Zealand, Cook Islands and Canada. He co-pioneered several community initiatives such as the Tamaki Achievement Pathway, Healthy Village Action Zone (HVAZ) Project, and the Inspiring Communities Exchange Network sponsored by the Tindall Foundation. Ngaro's governance experience includes key roles on the National Family Violence Taskforce, Auckland District Health Board and Pacific Advisory Committee Auckland City Council. He is also an Ambassador for the White Ribbon campaign. He later won a Sir Peter Blake Emerging Leader Award for his work on the Tamaki Transformation Project.

== Early political career ==
Ngaro served as the Auckland District Health Board's Pacific committee chairman and as the Tamaki College board of trustees chairman. He was a member of various advisory committees for the Ministry of Social Development.

Ngaro was encouraged by his friend Sam Lotu-Iiga, then the first-term National MP in Maungakiekie and a former Auckland City Councillor in Maungakiekie, to become active in politics. Ngaro contested the new Maungakiekie-Tāmaki ward on the Auckland Council at the 2010 Auckland local elections, as a Citizens and Ratepayers candidate. His campaign manager was Denise Krum. Ngaro finished second to Richard Northey and was not elected. He reportedly said, in his concession statement on election night, that "'the sandpit of local government' was not for him and he would aim higher to where the 'big people' play."

== Member of Parliament ==
New Zealand Parliament
Years	Term	Electorate	List	Party
2011–2014	50th	List	37	National
2014–2017	51st	List	34	National
2017–2020	52nd	List	20	National
2026–present	55th	List	5	NZ First

In early September 2011, Ngaro was announced as a list-only candidate for the New Zealand National Party at the 2011 election. He was ranked 37th on the party list and was subsequently elected to the 50th Parliament. He is the first Cook Islander to be elected to the New Zealand Parliament. In the 2014 general election, Ngaro was the National Party candidate for Te Atatū. He lost to Labour's Phil Twyford by 2,813 votes. Ranked 34th on the National Party list, Ngaro returned to parliament for his second term as a National list MP.

Between 2011 and 2016, during the second and third terms of the Fifth National Government, Ngaro was a member of the justice and electoral committee and the social services committee. He was deputy chair of the justice and electoral committee in 2013, deputy chair of the social services committee in 2014, and chair of the social services committee after the 2014 general election until his promotion into the ministry.

Ngaro was the member in charge of the Local Government (Auckland Council) Amendment Bill (No 3). This bill proposed amendments to the legislation governing Auckland Council that would prohibit candidates from holding office in more than one local board area. The bill was informally known as the "Warren Flaunty bill" after a pharmacist and politician who was elected to three local boards in the 2010 Auckland elections and two local boards in the 2013 Auckland elections. The bill passed into law in May 2016 with the support of National and Labour, and was implemented ahead of the 2016 local elections.

Ngaro, during his time as a backbench member of Parliament, was described as "one of Parliament's nice guys" and "a compliant party servant with a clear elevation strategy and part of a Pacific double act alongside Peseta [Sam Lotu-Iiga]." He was instrumental in getting Cook Islands World War One soldiers formally recognised by the New Zealand government for their role during the Great War. During the 2016 New Zealand National Party leadership election, Ngaro was identified as part of an internal party grouping of influential backbenchers nicknamed the "Four Amigos" with Chris Bishop, Todd Muller and Mark Mitchell. The group had come together campaigning for National in the 2015 Northland by-election. After the group put their support behind Bill English, Ngaro was promoted into the Cabinet, earning him the descriptor of the biggest winner in English's first ministerial reshuffle.

=== Minister in the Fifth National Government ===
Ngaro was sworn in as Minister for Pacific Peoples, Minister for the Community and Voluntary Sector, Associate Minister for Children and Associate Minister for Social Housing on 20 December 2016.

As minister, Ngaro increased the funding of Polyfest, the world's largest pacific festival. He launched a policy analysis framework for promoting Pacific perspectives in government decision-making. He also led the purchase by the government of motels in Gisborne and Hawke's Bay in an attempt to address social housing shortfalls in those regions.

In May 2017, he told a National Party conference that he could cut government funding to organisations associated with Labour candidate Willie Jackson if Jackson spoke out against the government during the election campaign. He apologised after his words were criticised by both Labour leader Andrew Little and Minister of Finance Steven Joyce. Prime Minister Bill English subsequently offered reassurances to community agencies that they would always be free to express views on government policy, and announced that he had asked officials to review the decisions Ngaro had made as a minister. Ngaro did not offer his resignation.

=== Opposition, 2017–2020 ===
Ngaro unsuccessfully contested Te Atatū for a second time at the 2017 general election. The National Government was also defeated. Ngaro became National's spokesperson for children, the community and voluntary sector, and pacific peoples. He sat on the social services and community committee.

In mid-May 2019, there were reports that Ngaro was considering forming his own Christian party, providing a potential coalition partner for National at the 2020 general election. National Party leader Simon Bridges initially downplayed these reports but later stated that he was giving Ngaro the "space" to explore setting up a Christian values party. In late May 2019, Ngaro ruled out starting a new Christian party and confirmed that he would remain a member of the National Party. He contested the 2020 general election for National, standing for a third time in Te Atatū and placed at 30th on the party list.

Ngaro attracted media attention during the election campaign when he posted a Facebook attack ad claiming that a vote for his Labour opponent Phil Twyford would lead to the decriminalisation of recreational cannabis and all drugs and unlimited abortion. Though Ngaro subsequently deleted his post, Twyford captured a screenshot and accused his opponent of spreading fake news. Ngaro's post was also criticised by Labour MP Ruth Dyson, Auckland councillor Richard Hills, political commentator Ben Thomas, and former Internet Party leader Laila Harré. In addition, National Party leader Judith Collins issued a media statement that Ngaro's comments were not shared by the rest of the party. Twyford defeated Ngaro by a final margin of 10,508 votes. Since he did not rank highly enough on the National's party list, he also lost his seat. Ngaro departed Parliament on 21 October after delivering a dawn prayer and a rendition of the national anthem God Defend New Zealand on the steps of Parliament.

== NewZeal party leadership, 2023–2026 ==
In 2023, the Christian conservative ONE Party rebranded as NewZeal and announced Ngaro as their leader. Of his joining NewZeal, Ngaro said: "I haven't moved from my values. I just feel that the National Party has moved away from some of the values that I've upheld." Specifically, Ngaro said National's support of the Labour government's enactment of gender self-identification laws in 2021 and its decision to prohibit conversion therapy in 2022 were a departure "from the values I held [and] believed the party was about." He defined himself and the party as centrist but sharing common interests with the centre-right National Party, and refuted that NewZeal was a Christian party.

During the 2023 New Zealand general election held on 14 October, Ngaro stood as a list-only candidate and led NewZeal to 0.56 percent of the total votes cast (16,126 votes), below the five percent threshold needed to enter Parliament.

Ngaro subsequently contested the 2023 Port Waikato by-election in late November 2023 as a NewZeal candidate. He came third in a diminished field after the withdrawal of Labour, Green and ACT New Zealand candidates, earning 409 votes.

In March 2026, Ngaro resigned as leader of NewZeal.

== Return to Parliament, 2026–present ==
On 22 March 2026, Ngaro attended New Zealand First leader Winston Peters' State of the Nation address in Tauranga where he announced that he would be standing as a candidate for the party during the 2026 New Zealand general election. That same day, Ngaro confirmed that he and the NewZeal party would align with New Zealand First, citing "strategic realism and shared values."

On 17 May 2026, Ngaro was announced as the party candidate for the Glendene electorate. He was ranked fifth place on the NZ First party list. On 7 November, Ngaro came fourth place in Glendene, with 2,178 votes based on preliminary results. He was elected to Parliament on the NZ First party list.

== Views and advocacy ==
Ngaro is a Christian and a self-described Christian Zionist. Ngaro holds a theology degree and served as a community pastor.

As a member of Parliament, Ngaro voted conservatively on social issues. Ngaro voted against the Marriage (Definition of Marriage) Amendment Bill, the End of Life Choice Bill and the Abortion Legislation Bill. In 2023, he stated the National Party's decision to not bloc oppose the Births, Deaths, Marriages, and Relationships Registration Act 2021 and the Conversion Practices Prohibition Legislation Act 2022 were part of his decision to leave the party.

In mid-May 2019, Ngaro attracted criticism from former National MP Jami-Lee Ross and the Abortion Law Reform Association of New Zealand when he shared a Facebook post on his page likening abortion to the Holocaust. Ngaro later apologised and issued a statement saying "he did not read the full Facebook post before sharing and said the word "tragedy" should have been used instead of "holocaust". In response, National Party leader Simon Bridges defended Ngaro's right to voice his opinion while stating that it was not something he would say.

In 2021, Ngaro co-founded the Indigenous Coalition for Israel with Sheree Trotter, an organisation dedicated to educating and empowering indigenous voices in support of Israel.

== Controversies ==
In 2009, Alfred Ngaro allegedly punched former Tamaki College art teacher Christopher Scott Roy for not bowing his head during a prayer, but the allegations were later dismissed in court by Chief Judge Graeme Colgan who wrote in a report: "I am sceptical about the veracity of Mr Roy's accounts of relevant and crucial events in this case. He is not a consistently reliable witness of truth." Tamaki College denied any assault occurred. In a judgment released mid November 2013, Employment Relations Authority member Tania Tetitaha found there were several issues with Roy's statements about the alleged accusations. When Roy took the matter to police, they declined to investigate. The ERA also found a lack of evidence of bullying behaviour. The police and Employment Relations Authority did not investigate the incident.

In 2024, Ngaro was investigated for and cleared of assault allegations after a family funeral in the Cook Islands.
