= Walk with Israel =

Annual pro-Israel fundraising walk in Toronto, Canada

- Status: Active
- Genre: Fundraising walk; community demonstration
- Frequency: Annually
- Locations: Toronto, Ontario, Canada
- Country: Canada
- Years active: 1970–present
- Founder: United Jewish Welfare Fund of Toronto
- Attendance: >60,000 (2026)
- Organiser: UJA Federation of Greater Toronto
- Website: walkwithisrael.com

Walk with Israel is an annual pro-Israel fundraising walk held in Toronto, Ontario, Canada. Organized by the UJA Federation of Greater Toronto, the event raises funds for programs assisting Israelis in need.

The event began in May 1970 as the "Walk for Jewish Survival", raising money for the UJA-Israel Special Fund. In 2026, organizers reported attendance of more than 60,000 people. The walk has also been accompanied by pro-Palestinian counter-demonstrations and increased police security in recent years.

In 2024, UJA described the event as the world's largest Israel solidarity walk outside Israel.

== History ==
The first walk was organized in May 1970 by Toronto's Jewish communal fundraising organization under the name "Walk for Jewish Survival". The original route was 35 kilometres (22 miles), and proceeds went to the UJA-Israel Special Fund.

The event has generally been held in the spring. Its route has included Bathurst Street in North York and, for a period, Lake Shore Boulevard near Exhibition Place. In 2026, the walk followed a 3.9-kilometre (2.5-mile) route from Temple Sinai Congregation on Wilson Avenue to Sherman Campus on Bathurst Street, where a festival was held.

The event attracted approximately 17,000 participants in 2015. In 2026, organizers reported attendance of more than 60,000, the highest in the event's history.

== Protests and security ==
The walk has been accompanied by pro-Palestinian counter-demonstrations following the 2023 Hamas-led attack on Israel and the subsequent Gaza war. Six people were arrested during the 2024 event.

In May 2025, Israel issued a travel advisory warning its citizens of increased security risks in Canada ahead of pro-Israel events, including the Toronto walk.

For the June 2026 walk, the Toronto Police Service announced traffic restrictions and additional security measures. Six people were arrested during the event.

== See also ==
- UJA Federation of Greater Toronto
- Canada–Israel relations
- Gaza war protests
- Israel Day on Fifth - a similar annual event in New York City
