= Dan Rosewarne =

New Zealand politician (born 1981)

Dan Rosewarne MP
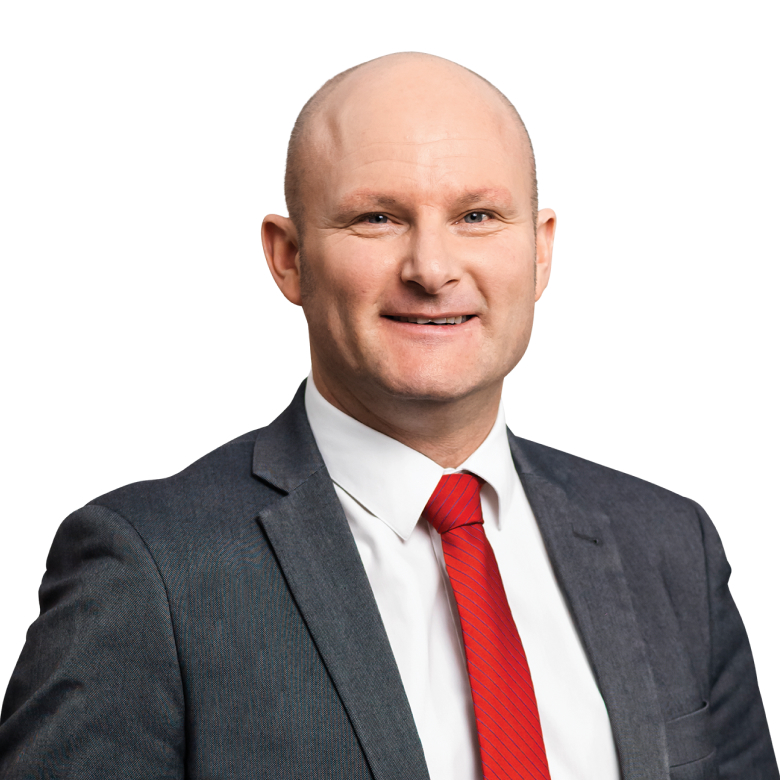
- Rosewarne in 2023

Member of the New Zealand Parliament for Labour party list
- In office 16 March 2026 – 7 November 2026
- Preceded by: Peeni Henare
- In office 25 July 2022 – 14 October 2023
- Preceded by: Kris Faafoi

Personal details
- Born: 1981 (age 44–45)
- Party: Labour
- Spouse: Sheree
- Children: 2

Military service
- Allegiance: New Zealand
- Branch/service: New Zealand Army
- Years of service: 1999–2022
- Rank: Captain

Daniel Peter Rosewarne (born 1981) is a New Zealand politician and former military officer. He is a Member of Parliament in the New Zealand House of Representatives for the New Zealand Labour Party, serving between July 2022 until October 2023. Rosewarne was unseated during the 2023 New Zealand general election. Following the resignation of Labour MP Peeni Henare in March 2026, Rosewarne re-entered Parliament on the Labour Party list.

== Early life ==
Rosewarne grew up in Wellington. He has Samoan ancestry. He trained as a mechanic at Wellington Polytechnic, before enlisting in the army. In his maiden speech to parliament, he said he was accepted into basic training despite failing both the mathematics test and the literacy test.

== Military career ==
In 1999, Rosewarne joined the New Zealand Army and trained as an automotive mechanic. He would later serve as a workshop manager before commissioning as an officer in the Royal New Zealand Army Logistic Regiment in 2017.

During his army career, Rosewarne made three overseas deployments. In 2005 and 2012, he was sent to Afghanistan as part of New Zealand's contribution to the War in Afghanistan. In-between his two Afghanistan deployments, he served overseas in 2008 in the Solomon Islands as part of the Regional Assistance Mission to Solomon Islands.

As a staff sergeant in 2016 he contributed to the New Zealand Defence Force response to the 2016 Kaikōura earthquake, driving one of 27 trucks carrying over 44 tonnes of vital supplies into the region. He retired from the Army in July 2022 at the rank of Captain just days before his swearing into Parliament.

== Political career ==
Rosewarne succeeded Clayton Cosgrove as Labour's candidate in Waimakariri at the 2017 general election. He was defeated by Matt Doocey by 10,766 votes, and his list ranking of 52 was not high enough to see him enter Parliament. He was reselected three years later to contest Waimakariri again in the 2020 general election. He lost to Doocey again, but picked up a large swing, cutting Doocey's majority to 1,507 votes.

New Zealand Parliament
Years	Term	Electorate	List	Party
2022–2023	53rd	List	56	Labour
2026	54th	List	32	Labour

=== First term, 2022–2023 ===
Despite the loss, Rosewarne became a Member of Parliament in July 2022, following the resignation of Kris Faafoi. His maiden speech, given on 27 July, recounted how he found his way to politics and the Labour Party after receiving state-funded treatment for otherwise-terminal cancer in 2014.

Rosewarne was initially appointed as a Labour member on the transport and infrastructure committee. In 2023, he sat on the foreign affairs, defence and trade committee, the education and workforce committee, and the finance and expenditure committee. He put himself forward for the Labour nomination in the seat of Christchurch East for the 2023 general election to replace the retiring Poto Williams, but was unsuccessful.

Rosewarne ran for a third time in Waimakariri in 2023, but lost to Doocey again. His position of 32 on the Labour Party list was not high enough to see him reelected. Following Labour's election defeat, he expressed regrets at the loss of perks that came with his job as a Member of Parliament including his Air New Zealand Koru Club privileges.

=== Second term, 2026–present ===
After Labour List MP Peeni Henare announced in early February 2026 that he would resign in the following weeks, the Labour Party announced that Rosewarne would be his replacement in Parliament. In a shadow cabinet reshuffle on 11 March, Rosewarne gained the rural communities and small businesses portfolios in the Shadow Cabinet of Chris Hipkins, although he was not officially declared elected by the Electoral Commission until 16 March 2026.

During the 2026 New Zealand general election, Rosewarne contested the Waimakariri electorate for Labour. He was ranked 35th on the Labour Party list. Rosewarne came second in Waimakariri with 12,627 votes based on preliminary results. Due to his lower party list ranking, he was not re-elected to Parliament via the Labour Party list.

== Personal life ==
He lives in Waimakariri with his wife and their two children. In 2014, Rosewarne was diagnosed with leukaemia and took immunotherapy drugs in order to beat the condition which would have otherwise been terminal.
