= 51st New Zealand Parliament =

Parliament elected in 2014

51st Parliament of New Zealand
←	50th Parliament	52nd Parliament	→
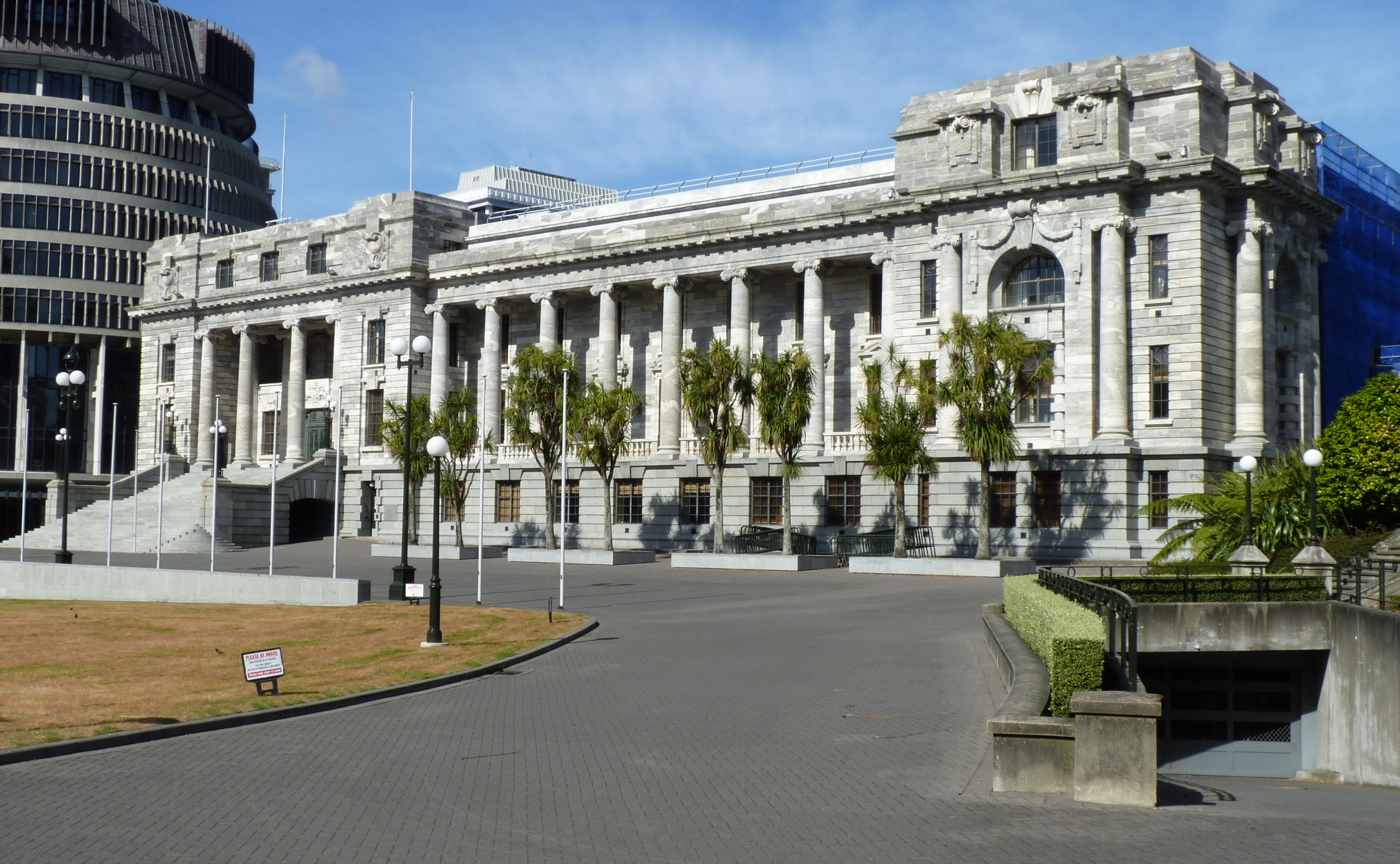
- Parliament House, Wellington

Overview
- Legislative body: New Zealand Parliament
- Term: 20 October 2014 – 18 August 2017
- Election: 2014 New Zealand general election
- Government: Fifth National Government

House of Representatives
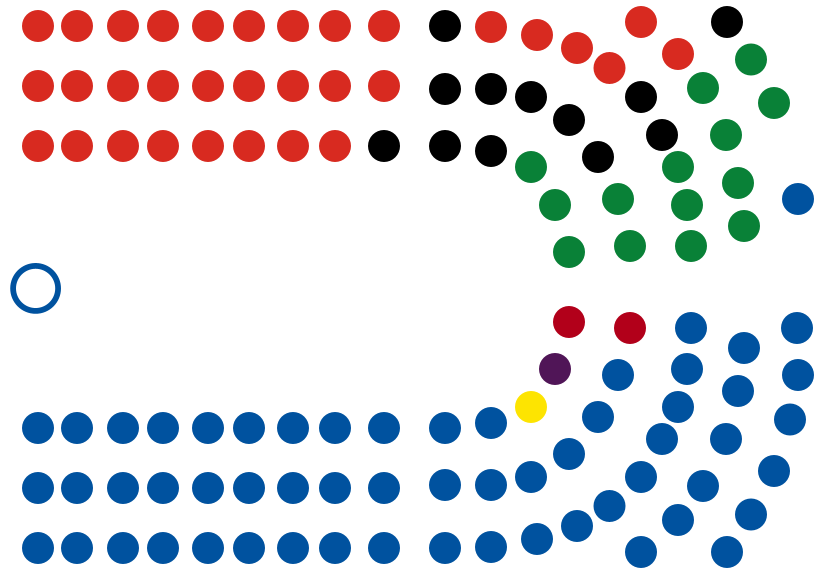
- Members: 121
- Speaker of the House: David Carter
- Leader of the House: Simon Bridges — Gerry Brownlee until 2 May 2017
- Prime Minister: Bill English — John Key until 12 December 2016
- Leader of the Opposition: Jacinda Ardern — Andrew Little until 1 August 2017

Sovereign
- Monarch: Elizabeth II
- Governor-General: Patsy Reddy from 28 September 2016 — Jerry Mateparae until 31 August 2016

The 51st New Zealand Parliament was elected at the 2014 general election. This Parliament consists of 121 members (120 seats plus one overhang seat) and was in place from September 2014 until August 2017, followed by the 2017 New Zealand general election. Following the final vote count John Key was able to continue to lead the Fifth National Government.

The Parliament was elected using a mixed-member proportional representation (MMP) voting system. Members of Parliament (MPs) represent 71 geographical electorates: 16 in the South Island, 48 in the North Island and 7 Māori electorates. The remaining members were elected from party lists using the Sainte-Laguë method to realise proportionality. The number of geographical electorates was increased from 70 at the previous election, to account for New Zealand's increasing population.

== Electorate boundaries for 51st Parliament ==
Electoral boundaries with results

The Representation Commission is tasked with reviewing electorate boundaries every five years following each New Zealand census. The last review had been undertaken in 2007, following the 2006 census, and the electorate boundaries determined then were used in both the 2008 and 2011 general elections.

The next census was scheduled for 8 March 2011, but it was postponed due to the disruption caused by the 2011 Christchurch earthquake on 22 February. The census was formally conducted on 5 March 2013 with additional data collection over the following several weeks. Following the census it was determined there would be sufficient time to conduct a boundary review of all electorates.

The boundaries were redrawn based on population distribution and the Māori electoral option, where people of Māori descent can opt to be either on the general or the Māori roll. By law, the South Island must have 16 general electorates, with the number of North Island general and Māori electorates being the respective population in each group divided by one-sixteenth of the South Island general electorate population, within a tolerance of five percent. At the 2011 election, there were 47 North Island general electorates and seven Māori electorates, totalling 70 electorates across the country.

Following significant consultation final boundaries were released by the Representation Commission on 17 April 2014. The 2014 general election was conducted under these boundaries on 20 September 2014. The increase in population in the Auckland region as recorded in the 2013 census meant an extra electorate was required to keep all electorates within five percent of their quota. To accommodate an extra electorate the Electoral Commission proposed major changes in West Auckland by abolishing the Waitakere electorate and establishing two new electorates, namely Kelston and Upper Harbour. Boundaries within Christchurch changed substantially, with several electorates growing and decreasing due to population movement around the city since the 2010–11 Christchurch earthquakes. In particular a dramatic change was seen in the electorates of Christchurch East, Christchurch Central and Port Hills with lesser changes in Selwyn, Wigram and Waimakariri.

== Officeholders ==
=== Speakers ===
- Speaker of the House of Representatives: Rt. Hon. David Carter
- Deputy Speaker: Hon. Chester Borrows
- Assistant Speaker: Lindsay Tisch
- Assistant Speaker: Hon. Trevor Mallard

==== Other parliamentary officers ====
- Clerk:
  - David Wilson (from 6 July 2015)
  - Mary Winifred Harris (until 5 July 2015)
- Serjeant-at-Arms:
  - Steve Streefkerk (from July 2016)
  - Brent Smith (until 18 March 2016)

=== Party leaders ===
- Prime Minister of New Zealand (National):
  - Rt. Hon. John Key (until 12 December 2016)
  - Rt. Hon. Bill English (from 12 December 2016)
    - Deputy Prime Minister of New Zealand (National):
      - Hon. Bill English (until 12 December 2016)
      - Hon. Paula Bennett (from 12 December 2016)
- Leader of the Opposition (Labour):
  - Andrew Little (18 November 2014 - 1 August 2017)
  - Jacinda Ardern (from 1 August 2017)
    - Deputy Leader of the Opposition (Labour):
      - Hon. Annette King (18 November 2014 - 7 March 2017)
      - Jacinda Ardern (7 March - 1 August 2017)
      - Kelvin Davis (from 1 August 2017)
- Co-leaders of the Green Party of Aotearoa New Zealand:
  - Male Co-leader:
    - Russel Norman (until 30 May 2015)
    - James Shaw (from 30 May 2015)
  - Female Co-leader:
    - Metiria Turei (until 9 August 2017)
    - Vacant (from 9 August 2017)
- Leader of New Zealand First: Rt. Hon. Winston Peters
  - Deputy Leader of New Zealand First:
    - Tracey Martin (until 2 July 2015)
    - Ron Mark (from 3 July 2015)
- Co-leaders of the Māori Party:
  - Male co-leader of the Party: Hon. Te Ururoa Flavell
  - Female co-leader of the Party: Marama Fox
- Leader of ACT New Zealand: David Seymour
- Leader of United Future:
  - Hon. Peter Dunne (until 23 August 2017)
  - Damian Light (from 23 August 2017, acting outside the House)

=== Floor leaders ===
- Leader of the House (National):
  - Hon. Gerry Brownlee (until 2 May 2017)
  - Hon. Simon Bridges (from 2 May 2017)
- Shadow Leader of the House (Labour): Chris Hipkins

=== Whips ===
- Senior Government (National) Whip:
  - Jami-Lee Ross (from 2 May 2017)
  - Tim Macindoe (until 2 May 2017)
    - Junior Government Whip:
      - Barbara Kuriger (from 2 May 2017)
      - Jami-Lee Ross (until 2 May 2017)
    - Third Government Whip:
      - Matt Doocey (from 2 May 2017)
      - Barbara Kuriger (7 February - 2 May 2017)
      - Jo Hayes (until 7 February 2017)
- Senior Opposition (Labour) Whip:
  - Kris Faafoi (from 15 December 2016)
  - Chris Hipkins (until 15 December 2016)
    - Junior Opposition Whip: Carmel Sepuloni
    - Assistant Opposition Whip: Kris Faafoi (30 November 2015 - 15 December 2016)
- Green Party Whip (Musterer): David Clendon (until 8 August 2017)
- New Zealand First Whip: Barbara Stewart
  - Associate Whip: Clayton Mitchell (from 3 July 2015)

== Members ==
The tables below show the members of the 51st Parliament based on preliminary counts of the 2014 general election.

=== Overview ===
The table below shows the number of MPs in each party following the 2014 election and at dissolution:

Affiliation	Members	
Affiliation	At 2014 election	At dissolution
National	60	59
Māori Party ^{CS}	2	2
ACT ^{CS}	1	1
United Future ^{CS}	1	1
Government total	64	63
Labour	32	32
Green	14	14
NZ First	11	12
Opposition total	57	58
Total	121	121
Working Government majority	7	5

Notes

- ^CS The Māori Party, United Future and ACT once again entered into confidence and supply agreements to form a majority, as they did in the previous two parliaments.
- The Working Government majority is calculated as all Government MPs less all other parties.

=== New Zealand National Party (60) ===
The National Party won 47.04% of the vote, entitling it to 60 seats. As it won 41 electorates, an additional 19 members were taken from the party list. After the resignation of Northland MP Mike Sabin a by-election was held and lost to New Zealand First. The party's share of seats was reduced to 59.

15 new National Party members were elected, nine from electorates and six from the list. 45 members from the 50th Parliament were returned.

Name	Electorate (list if blank)	Term in office	Portfolios & Responsibilities
David Carter		1994–	Speaker of the House; Chairperson, Officers of Parliament Committee; Chairperson, Business Committee; Chairperson, Standing Orders Committee; Chairperson, Parliamentary Service Commission
Chester Borrows	Whanganui	2005–	Deputy Speaker of the House
Lindsay Tisch	Waikato	1999–	Assistant Speaker of the House
Ministers in Cabinet
Bill English		1990–	Party Leader; Prime Minister; Minister of National Security and Intelligence; Minister Responsible for Ministerial Services
Paula Bennett	Upper Harbour	2005–	Deputy Party Leader; Deputy Prime Minister; Minister for Climate Change Issues; Minister of Police; Minister of State Services; Minister of Tourism; Minister for Women
Steven Joyce		2008–	Minister of Finance; Minister for Infrastructure
Gerry Brownlee	Ilam	1996–	Leader of the House; Minister supporting Greater Christchurch Regeneration; Minister of Civil Defence; Minister of Defence; Minister Responsible for the Earthquake Commission
Simon Bridges	Tauranga	2008–	Deputy Leader of the House; Minister for Economic Development; Minister of Transport; Minister for Communications; Associate Minister of Finance
Amy Adams	Selwyn	2008–	Minister of Justice; Minister for Courts; Minister for Social Housing; Minister Responsible for Social Investment; Minister Responsible for Housing New Zealand Corporation; Associate Minister of Finance
Jonathan Coleman	Northcote	2005–	Minister of Health; Minister for Sport and Recreation
Christopher Finlayson		2005–	Attorney-General; Minister for Treaty of Waitangi Negotiations; Associate Minister of Māori Development; Minister in Charge of the NZSIS; Minister Responsible for the GCSB; Chairperson, Privileges Committee
Michael Woodhouse		2008–	Minister of Immigration; Minister for ACC; Minister for Workplace Relations and Safety
Anne Tolley	East Coast	1999–2002; 2005–	Minister for Social Development; Minister for Children; Minister for Local Government
Hekia Parata		2008–	Minister of Education
Nathan Guy	Ōtaki	2005–	Minister for Primary Industries; Minister for Racing; Associate Minister for Economic Development
Murray McCully	East Coast Bays	1987–	Minister of Foreign Affairs
Nikki Kaye	Auckland Central	2008–	Minister for Youth; Associate Minister of Education
Nick Smith	Nelson	1990–	Minister for the Environment; Minister for Building and Construction
Judith Collins	Papakura	2002–	Minister for Energy and Resources; Minister of Revenue; Minister for Ethnic Communities
Todd McClay	Rotorua	2008–	Minister for State Owned Enterprises; Minister of Trade
Maggie Barry	North Shore	2011–	Minister for Arts, Culture and Heritage; Minister of Conservation; Minister for Seniors
Paul Goldsmith		2011–	Minister for Regulatory Reform; Minister of Science and Innovation; Minister for Tertiary Education, Skills and Employment
Louise Upston	Taupō	2008–	Minister of Corrections; Associate Minister of Primary Industries; Associate Minister of Education; Associate Minister for Tertiary Education, Skills and Employment
Alfred Ngaro		2011–	Minister for Pacific Peoples; Minister for the Community and Voluntary Sector; Associate Minister for Children; Associate Minister for Social Housing
Ministers outside Cabinet
Nicky Wagner	Christchurch Central	2005–	Minister of Customs; Minister for Disability Issues; Associate Minister of Conservation; Associate Minister supporting Greater Christchurch Regeneration
Mark Mitchell	Rodney	2011–	Minister for Land Information; Minister of Statistics; Associate Minister of Justice
Jacqui Dean	Waitaki	2005–	Minister for Commerce and Consumer Affairs; Minister for Small Business; Associate Minister for ACC; Associate Minister for Local Government
David Bennett	Hamilton East	2005–	Minister for Veterans' Affairs; Minister for Food Safety; Associate Minister of Immigration; Associate Minister of Transport
Members of Parliament
Alastair Scott	Wairarapa	2014–	Deputy Chairperson, Finance and Expenditure Committee
Andrew Bayly	Hunua	2014–	Deputy Chairperson, Local Government and Environment Committee
Barbara Kuriger	Taranaki-King Country	2014–	Third Whip; Deputy Chairperson, Health Committee
Brett Hudson		2014–	Deputy Chairperson, Commerce Committee
Chris Bishop		2014–	Chairperson, Finance and Expenditure Committee
Craig Foss	Tukituki	2005–	Deputy Chairperson, Regulations Review Committee
Ian McKelvie	Rangitīkei	2011–	Chairperson, Primary Production Committee
Jami-Lee Ross	Botany	2011–	Junior Whip; Chairperson, Parliamentary Service Commission Precincts Committee
Jian Yang		2011–	Chairperson, Education and Science Committee; Parliamentary Private Secretary to the Minister for Ethnic Communities
Jo Goodhew	Rangitata	2005–	
Jo Hayes		2014–	Chairperson, Social Services Committee
Jonathan Young	New Plymouth	2008–	Chairperson, Transport and Industrial Relations Committee; Parliamentary Private Secretary to the Minister of Economic Development
Jono Naylor		2014–	Deputy Chairperson, Justice and Electoral Committee
Kanwaljit Singh Bakshi		2008–	Chairperson, Law and Order Committee; Parliamentary Private Secretary to the Minister of Police
Matt Doocey	Waimakariri	2014–	Deputy Chairperson, Social Services Committee
Maureen Pugh		2015–	Deputy Chairperson, Law and Order Committee
Maurice Williamson	Pakuranga	1987–	
Melissa Lee		2008–	Chairperson, Commerce Committee; Parliamentary Private Secretary to the Minister for Ethnic Communities
Tutehounuku Korako		2014–	Chairperson, Māori Affairs Committee
Parmjeet Parmar		2014–	Deputy Chairperson, Transport and Industrial Relations Committee
Paul Foster-Bell		2013–	Deputy Chairperson, Government Administration Committee
Peseta Sam Lotu-Iiga	Maungakiekie	2008–	
Sarah Dowie	Invercargill	2014–	Chairperson, Justice and Electoral Committee
Scott Simpson	Coromandel	2011–	Chairperson, Local Government and Environment Committee; Parliamentary Private Secretary to the Minister for the Environment; Parliamentary Private Secretary to Minister of Conservation
Shane Reti	Whangarei	2014–	Deputy Chairperson, Foreign Affairs, Defence and Trade Committee
Simon O'Connor	Tāmaki	2011–	Chairperson, Health Committee
Stuart Smith	Kaikōura	2014–	Deputy Chairperson, Primary Production Committee
Tim Macindoe	Hamilton West	2008–	Senior Whip
Todd Barclay	Clutha-Southland	2014–	Deputy Chairperson, Education and Science Committee
Todd Muller	Bay of Plenty	2014–	Chairperson, Foreign Affairs, Defence and Trade Committee
Members of the National caucus who resigned, retired or died during the term of the 51st Parliament
Mike Sabin	Northland	2011–2015	Resigned January 2015
Tim Groser		2005–2015	Resigned December 2015
John Key	Helensville	2002–2017	Resigned April 2017

=== New Zealand Labour Party (32) ===
The Labour Party won 25.13% of the vote, entitling it to 32 seats. As it won 27 electorates, an additional 5 members were taken from the party list. After the resignation of David Shearer in December 2016, the party's share of seats was reduced to 31 until Raymond Huo was sworn in in March 2017.

Three new Labour Party members were elected from the list. 29 members from the 50th Parliament were returned.

Name	Electorate (list if blank)	Term in office	Portfolios & Responsibilities
Trevor Mallard	Hutt South	1984–1990; 1993–	Deputy Chairperson for Officers of Parliament Committee; Assistant Speaker of the House; Spokesperson for Sport and Recreation; Spokesperson for Animal Welfare; Spokesperson for Parliamentary Reform
Shadow Cabinet
Andrew Little		2011–	Party Leader; Leader of the Opposition; Spokesperson for Security and Intelligence
Jacinda Ardern	Mount Albert	2008–	Deputy Party Leader; Deputy Leader of the Opposition; Chairperson for Parliamentary Service Commission Artworks Committee; Spokesperson for Justice; Spokesperson for Arts, Culture and Heritage; Spokesperson for Children; Spokesperson for Small Business; Elected to Parliament in a by-election, replacing David Shearer
Grant Robertson	Wellington Central	2008–	Spokesperson for Finance; Spokesperson for Employment
Phil Twyford	Te Atatū	2008–	Spokesperson for Housing; Spokesperson for Building and Construction; Spokesperson for Auckland Issues
Megan Woods	Wigram	2011–	Spokesperson for Canterbury Issues; Spokesperson for Climate Change
Chris Hipkins	Rimutaka	2008–	Shadow Leader of the House; Spokesperson for Education
Kelvin Davis	Te Tai Tokerau	2008–2011; 2014–	Spokesperson for Māori Development; Spokesperson for Corrections
Carmel Sepuloni	Kelston	2008–2011; 2014–	Junior Whip; Spokesperson for Social Development
David Clark	Dunedin North	2011–	Spokesperson for Economic Development and Regional Development; Spokesperson for Trade and Export Growth
David Parker		2002–	Deputy Chairperson, Privileges Committee; Shadow Attorney-General; Spokesperson for Environment; Spokesperson for Water; Spokesperson for State Owned Enterprises; Spokesperson for ICT; Spokesperson for Entrepreneurship; Spokesperson for Regulatory Reform
Nanaia Mahuta	Hauraki-Waikato	1996–	Deputy Chairperson, Māori Affairs Committee; Spokesperson for Conservation; Spokesperson for Treaty of Waitangi Negotiations; Spokesperson for Whānau Ora
Stuart Nash	Napier	2008–2011; 2014–	Spokesperson for Police; Spokesperson for Revenue; Spokesperson for Energy; Spokesperson for Forestry
Members of Parliament
Meka Whaitiri	Ikaroa-Rāwhiti	2013–	Spokesperson for Local Government
Iain Lees-Galloway	Palmerston North	2008–	Spokesperson for Workplace Relations and Safety; Spokesperson for Immigration
Su’a William Sio	Mangere	2008–	Spokesperson for Pacific Island Affairs; Spokesperson for Interfaith Dialogue
Sue Moroney		2005–	Spokesperson for Transport; Spokesperson for ACC
Damien O'Connor	West Coast-Tasman	1993–2008; 2009–	Spokesperson for Primary Industries; Spokesperson for Biosecurity; Spokesperson for Food Safety
Kris Faafoi	Mana	2010–	Senior Whip; Spokesperson for State Services; Spokesperson for Racing; Spokesperson for Tourism
Jenny Salesa	Manukau East	2014–	Spokesperson for Skills and Training
Peeni Henare	Tāmaki Makaurau	2014–	Spokesperson for Urban Māori; Spokesperson for Māori Broadcasting
Clare Curran	Dunedin South	2008–	Chairperson for Parliamentary Service Commission ICT Committee; Spokesperson for Broadcasting; Spokesperson for Open Government; Spokesperson for Civil Defence and Emergency Management
Adrian Paki Rurawhe	Te Tai Hauāuru	2014–	Spokesperson for Internal Affairs
Annette King	Rongotai	1984–1990; 1993–	Spokesperson for State Services
Ruth Dyson	Port Hills	1993–	Chairperson for Government Administration Committee; Spokesperson for Senior Citizens; Spokesperson for Women's Affairs; Spokesperson for Statistics
Rino Tirikatene	Te Tai Tonga	2011–	Spokesperson for Fisheries; Spokesperson for Customs
Poto Williams	Christchurch East	2013-	Spokesperson for Community and Voluntary; Spokesperson for Disability Issues
Louisa Wall	Manurewa	2008; 2011–	Spokesperson for Courts; Spokesperson for Youth Affairs
Clayton Cosgrove		1999–	Spokesperson for Business Outreach; Spokesperson for Commerce; Spokesperson for Veterans’ Affairs
Michael Wood	Mount Roskill	2016–	Spokesperson for Consumer Affairs; Spokesperson for Ethnic Communities; Spokesperson for Revenue
Raymond Huo		2008–2014; 2017–	Entered Parliament March 2017; Spokesperson for Land Information
members of the Labour caucus who resigned during the term of the 51st Parliament
Phil Goff	Mount Roskill	1981–1990; 1993–2016	Spokesperson for Defence; Spokesperson for Ethnic Communities; Resigned October 2016 after being elected Mayor of Auckland
David Shearer	Mount Albert	2009–2016	Spokesperson for Consumer Affairs; Spokesperson for Foreign Affairs; Resigned December 2016 after being hired by the United Nations
David Cunliffe	New Lynn	1999–2017	Chairperson for Regulations Review Committee; Spokesperson for Disarmament; Spokesperson for Research and Development; Spokesperson for Science and Innovation; Spokesperson for Land information; Undersecretary to the Leader on Superannuation Issues; Resigned April 2017

=== Green Party of Aotearoa New Zealand (14) ===
The Green Party won 10.7% of the vote, entitling it to 14 seats. As it did not win any electorate, all members were taken from the party list.

One new Green Party members were elected, with thirteen members from the 50th Parliament returning.

Name	Electorate (list if blank)	Term in office	Portfolios & Responsibilities
James Shaw		2014–	Co-leader of the Green Party; Spokesperson for Climate Change; Spokesperson for Economic Development
Metiria Turei		2002–	Co-leader of the Green Party; Spokesperson for Inequality; Spokesperson for Building and Social Housing; Spokesperson for National Intelligence; Spokesperson for Security
Catherine Delahunty		2008–	Spokesperson for Education and Novopay; Spokesperson for Water; Spokesperson for Human Rights; Spokesperson for Te Tiriti o Waitangi
David Clendon		2009–	Musterer ('’Party Whip’'); Spokesperson for Tourism; Spokesperson for Small Business; Spokesperson for Criminal Justice, Courts, Corrections, and Police
Denise Roche		2011–	Spokesperson for Workplace Relations and Safety; Spokesperson for Waste; Spokesperson for Immigration, Pacific Peoples, and Ethnic Affairs; Spokesperson for Internal Affairs, Statistics, Arts, Culture, Heritage, Ministerial Services, Racing, and Gambling; Spokesperson for Auckland Issues
Eugenie Sage		2011–	Spokesperson for Environment; Spokesperson for Primary Industries; Spokesperson for Land Information; Spokesperson for Canterbury Earthquake Recover; Spokesperson for Earthquake Commission
Gareth Hughes		2010–	Spokesperson for Energy and Resources; Spokesperson for Tertiary Education, Skills and Employment; Spokesperson for Science and Innovation; Spokesperson for ICT; Spokesperson for Broadcasting; Spokesperson for Wellington Issues
Jan Logie		2011–	Spokesperson for Social Development, Women, Community and Voluntary Sector; Spokesperson for State Services; Spokesperson for Local Government and Civil Defence; Spokesperson for Rainbow Issues
Julie Anne Genter		2011–	Spokesperson for Finance, Revenue, and SOEs; Spokesperson for Transport; Spokesperson for Youth
Kennedy Graham		2008–	Spokesperson for Foreign Affairs, Defence, Disarmament, Customs; Spokesperson for Trade; Spokesperson for Veterans Affairs; Spokesperson for Senior Citizens
Mojo Mathers		2011–	Spokesperson for Commerce, Consumer Affairs, and Regulatory Reform; Spokesperson for Disability Issues; Spokesperson for Animal Welfare
Steffan Browning		2011–	Spokesperson for Organics; Spokesperson for GE; Spokesperson for Biosecurity; Spokesperson for Pesticides; Spokesperson for Food Safety
Marama Davidson		2015–	Entered Parliament November 2015
Barry Coates		2016-	Entered Parliament October 2016
Members of the Greens caucus who resigned during the term of the 50th Parliament
Russel Norman		2008–2015	Resigned October 2015
Kevin Hague		2008–2016	Resigned October 2016

=== New Zealand First (11) ===
New Zealand First won 8.66% of the vote, entitling it to eleven seats from the party list. An additional seat was gained for the party when Winston Peters won the Northland by-election.

Name	Electorate (list if blank)	Term in office	Portfolios & Responsibilities
Winston Peters	Northland	1978–1981; 1984–2008; 2011–	Leader of New Zealand First; Spokesperson for Economic Development; Spokesperson for Finance; Spokesperson for Foreign Affairs; Spokesperson for Immigration; Spokesperson for Racing; Spokesperson for Senior Citizens and Superannuation; Elected to Parliament in a by-election, replacing Mike Sabin
Ron Mark		1996–2008; 2014–	Deputy Leader of New Zealand First; Spokesperson for Arts, Culture and Heritage; Spokesperson for Defence; Spokesperson for Building and Construction; Spokesperson for Police; Spokesperson for Veteran's Affairs; Spokesperson for Local Government
Barbara Stewart		2002–2008; 2011–	Party Whip; Spokesperson for ACC; Spokesperson for Disability Issues; Spokesperson for Family Issues; Spokesperson for Health
Clayton Mitchell		2014–	Party Associate Whip; Spokesperson for Internal Affairs; Spokesperson for Sports and Recreation; Spokesperson for Conservation; Spokesperson for Labour and Industrial Relations
Darroch Ball		2014–	Spokesperson for Research, Science and Technology; Spokesperson for Social Policy/Welfare; Spokesperson for Civil Defence and Emergency Issues; Spokesperson for Consumer Affairs; Spokesperson for Youth Affairs
Denis O'Rourke		2011–	Spokesperson for Attorney-General and Courts; Spokesperson for Christchurch Earthquake Issues; Spokesperson for Security Issues; Spokesperson for Constitutional Review; Spokesperson for Housing; Spokesperson for Justice; Spokesperson for Transport; Spokesperson for Climate Change; Spokesperson for Environment and RMA; Spokesperson for Government Communications Security Bureau
Fletcher Tabuteau		2014–	Spokesperson for Commerce; Spokesperson for Energy; Spokesperson for Tourism; Spokesperson for Revenue; Spokesperson for Trade
Mahesh Bindra		2014–	Spokesperson for Corrections; Spokesperson for Ethnic Affairs; Spokesperson for Land Information New Zealand; Spokesperson for Customs
Tracey Martin		2011–	Spokesperson for Communications and IT; Spokesperson for Education; Spokesperson for Women's Affairs; Spokesperson for Broadcasting
Pita Paraone		2002–2008; 2014–	Spokesperson for Māori Affairs; Spokesperson for Treaty of Waitangi Issues; Spokesperson for Pacific Island Affairs; Spokesperson for Office of Treaty Settlements
Richard Prosser		2011–	Spokesperson for Agriculture and Primary Industries; Spokesperson for Biosecurity; Spokesperson for State Owned Enterprises; Spokesperson for Fisheries; Spokesperson for Forestry; Spokesperson for Outdoor Recreation; Spokesperson for Serious Fraud Office
Ria Bond		2015–	Spokesperson for Community and Voluntary Sector; Entered Parliament April 2015

=== Māori Party (2) ===
The Māori Party won 1.32% of the vote, which is short of the 5% threshold. However, the Māori Party won an electorate and will thus be represented by one electorate MP. The 1.32% party vote share entitles the party to two seats, including an MP from the party list.

Name	Electorate (list if blank)	Term in office	Portfolios & Responsibilities
Marama Fox		2014–	Co-leader of the Māori Party
Te Ururoa Flavell	Waiariki	2005–	Co-leader of the Māori Party; Minister for Māori Development; Minister for Whānau Ora; Associate Minister for Economic Development

=== United Future (1) ===
United Future won 0.22% of the vote, which is short of the 5% threshold. United Future won one electorate and will thus be represented by one electorate MP. Because the 0.22% party vote share would not entitle United Future to any seats, the size of the 51st Parliament was increased to 121 seats.

Name	Electorate (list if blank)	Term in office	Portfolios & Responsibilities
Peter Dunne	Ōhariu	1984–	Father of the House; Leader of United Future; Minister of Internal Affairs; Associate Minister of Conservation; Associate Minister of Health

=== ACT New Zealand (1) ===
ACT New Zealand won 0.69% of the vote, which is short of the 5% threshold. ACT won one electorate and was thus represented by one electorate MP. The 0.69% party vote share entitled the party to one seat.

Name	Electorate (list if blank)	Term in office	Portfolios & Responsibilities
David Seymour	Epsom	2014–	Leader of ACT New Zealand; Parliamentary Under-Secretary to the Minister of Education; Parliamentary Under-Secretary to the Minister of Regulatory Reform

=== Demographics of elected MPs ===
Attribute	Number	Change
Gender
Male	83	▲1
Female	38	▼1
Ethnicity
European & other	83	▼5
Māori	25	▲3
Pacific	8	▲2
Asian	5	0
Date of birth/Generation
1945 or earlier ("Silent Generation")	2	
1946 to 1965 ("Baby Boomer")	65	
1966 to 1985 ("Generation X")	53	
1986 or later ("Millennial")	1	▲1

== Summary of changes during term ==
The following changes occurred in the 51st Parliament:

#	Electorate	Incumbent				Winner			
#	Electorate	Party	Name	Date vacated	Reason	Party	Name	Date elected	Change
1.	Northland	National	Mike Sabin	30 January 2015	Personal reasons following reports he was suspect of Police investigation.	NZ First	Winston Peters	28 March 2015	New Zealand First gain National loss
2.	List ^{1}	NZ First	Winston Peters	23 April 2015	Elected to electorate seat.	NZ First	Ria Bond	24 April 2015	List
3.	List	Green	Russel Norman	30 October 2015	Resigned to take up position as Chief Executive of Greenpeace Aotearoa New Zealand.	Green	Marama Davidson	2 November 2015	List
4.	List	National	Tim Groser	19 December 2015	Resigned to become NZ Ambassador to the United States.	National	Maureen Pugh	21 December 2015	List
5.	List	Green	Kevin Hague	6 October 2016	Resigned to become Chief Executive of the Royal Forest and Bird Protection Society of New Zealand	Green	Barry Coates	7 October 2016	List
6.	Mount Roskill	Labour	Phil Goff	12 October 2016	Resigned following election as Mayor of Auckland.	Labour	Michael Wood	3 December 2016	Labour hold
7.	Mount Albert	Labour	David Shearer	31 December 2016	Resigned to take up a role with the United Nations.	Labour	Jacinda Ardern	25 February 2017	Labour hold
8.	List ^{1}	Labour	Jacinda Ardern	25 February 2017	Elected to electorate seat	Labour	Raymond Huo	15 March 2017	List
9.	Helensville	National	John Key	14 April 2017	Resigned	None^{2}			
10.	New Lynn	Labour	David Cunliffe	23 April 2017	Resigned	None^{2}			

^1 These changes occurred as a result of the elevation of Winston Peters and Jacinda Ardern from their respective party lists to being elected to an electorate seat.
^2 The resignations of John Key and David Cunliffe took place less than six months before the next general election and therefore by-elections to fill the vacancies were not required.

== Seating plan ==
=== Start of term ===
The chamber is in a horseshoe-shape.

													Rurawhe	Salesa	Shaw	Browning
Mallard	Dyson	D. O'Connor	Cosgrove	Moroney	Curran	Faafoi	Wall	Nash	Paraone	Tirikatene	Whaitiri	Williams	Henare	Ball		Logie	Roche
Sio	Lees-Galloway	Sepuloni	Hipkins	Woods	Cunliffe	Parker	Shearer	Goff	Mark	Stewart	O'Rourke	C. Mitchell	Tabuteau		Bindra	Genter	Vacant
Clark	Ardern	King	Little	Robertson	Mahuta	Twyford	Davis	Prosser	Peters	Martin	Hague	Norman		Mathers	Delahunty	Graham	S. Smith
													Turei	Clendon	Hughes
Carter															Sage
Carter															Foster-Bell
													Flavell	Fox	Korako
Finlayson	Adams	English	KEY	Brownlee	Joyce	P. Bennett	Coleman	Bridges	Parata	Tolley	Seymour	Dunne		Hayes	S. O'Connor	Barclay	Scott
McCully	N. Smith	Ross	Macindoe	Guy	Kaye	Groser	Woodhouse	McClay	Lee	Dean	D. Bennett	Young	McKelvie		Simpson	Naylor	Muller
Borrows	Tisch	Lotu-liga	Barry	Foss	Goodhew	Wagner	Upston	Goldsmith	Williamson	Collins	Yang	Ngaro	Bakshi	M. Mitchell	Parmar	Bishop	Kuriger
													Reti	Hudson	Bayly	Doocey	Dowie

=== End of term ===
The chamber is in a horseshoe-shape.

													Wood	Vacant	Bond	Browning
Mallard	Dyson	Moroney	D. O'Connor	Salesa	Henare	Curran	Rurawhe	Tirikatene	Paraone	Huo	Cosgrove	Wall	Williams	Ball		Delahunty	Clendon
King	Parker	Sepuloni	Faafoi	Mahuta	Nash	Whaitiri	Less-Galloway	Sio	Prosser	Stewart	O'Rourke	C. Mitchell	Tabuteau		Bindra	Turei	Graham
Woods	Hipkins	Davis	Ardern	Robertson	Twyford	Clark	Little	Martin	Peters	Mark	Genter	Davidson		Mathers	Coates	Roche	Vacant
													Shaw	Sage	Logie
Carter															Hughes
Carter															Lotu-Iiga
													Flavell	Fox	Parata
Finlayson	Coleman	P. Bennett	ENGLISH	Joyce	Brownlee	Bridges	Adams	Woodhouse	Tolley	Guy	Seymour	Dunne		Doocey	Dowie	Barclay	Scott
McClay	Kaye	Kuriger	Ross	N. Smith	Collins	Barry	Goldsmith	Upston	Lee	Young	Bakshi	S. O'Connor	McKelvie		Korako	Naylor	Reti
Borrows	Tisch	Ngaro	M. Mitchell	Wagner	Dean	D. Bennett	Macindoe	Simpson	Williamson	McCully	Yang	Hayes	Muller	Bishop	Parmar	Foster-Bell	Hudson
													Foss	Goodhew	S. Smith	Pugh	Bayly

== See also ==
- Opinion polling for the 2017 New Zealand general election
- Politics of New Zealand
