= 50th New Zealand Parliament =

Term of the Parliament of New Zealand

50th Parliament of New Zealand
←	49th Parliament	51st Parliament	→
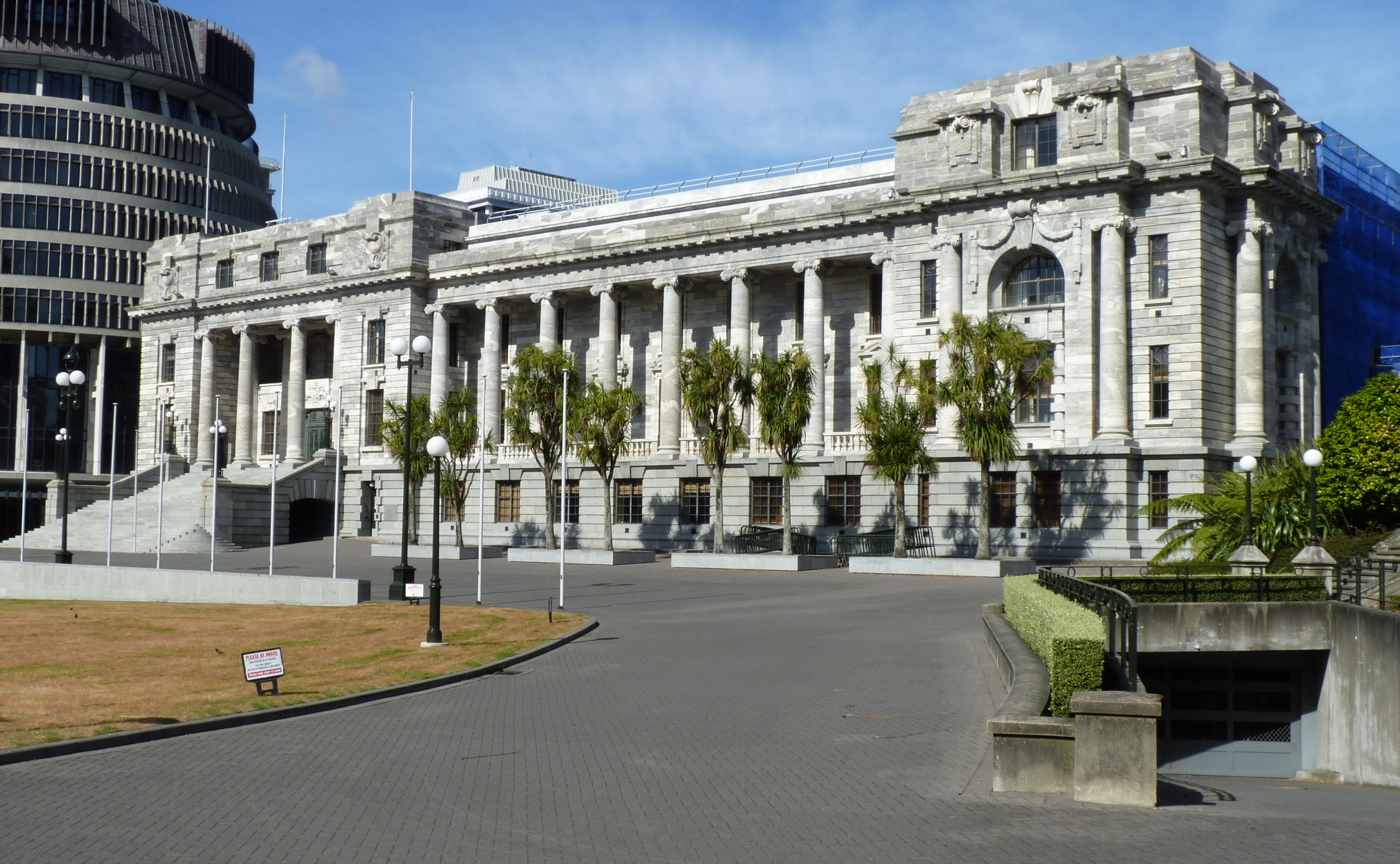
- Parliament House, Wellington

Overview
- Legislative body: New Zealand Parliament
- Term: 20 December 2011 – 14 August 2014
- Election: 2011 New Zealand general election
- Government: Fifth National Government

House of Representatives
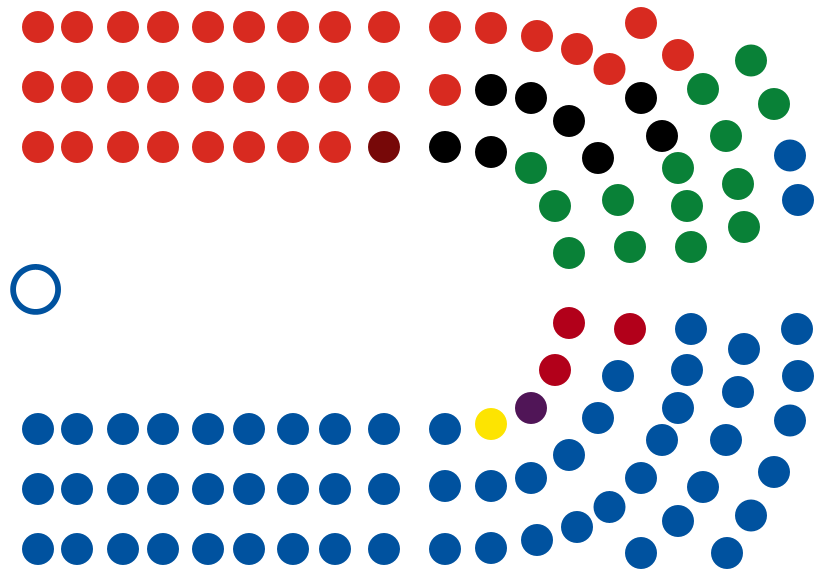
- Members: 121
- Speaker of the House: David Carter — Lockwood Smith until 31 January 2013
- Leader of the House: Gerry Brownlee
- Prime Minister: John Key
- Leader of the Opposition: David Cunliffe — David Shearer until 15 September 2013

Sovereign
- Monarch: Elizabeth II
- Governor-General: Jerry Mateparae

The 50th New Zealand Parliament was elected at the 2011 general election. It had 121 members (120 seats plus one overhang seat), and was in place from December 2011 until September 2014, followed by the 2014 general election. The first sitting of the 50th Parliament was held on 20 December 2011, where members were sworn in and Lockwood Smith was elected Speaker of the House. This was followed by the speech from the throne on 21 December. John Key continued to lead the Fifth National Government. Following the resignation of Smith, David Carter was elected Speaker.

The Parliament was elected using the mixed-member proportional representation (MMP) voting system. Members of Parliament (MPs) represent 70 geographical electorates: 16 in the South Island, 47 in the North Island and 7 Māori electorates. The remaining 51 members were elected from party lists using the Sainte-Laguë method to realise proportionality.

== Electorate boundaries for 50th Parliament ==
Electoral boundaries with results

The Representation Commission is tasked with reviewing electorate boundaries every five years following each New Zealand census. The last review was undertaken in 2007 following the 2006 census, and the electorate boundaries determined then were used in both the 2008 and 2011 general elections.

The next census was scheduled for 8 March 2011, but it was postponed due to the disruption caused by the 22 February 2011 Christchurch earthquake. The new date for the census was 5 March 2013, and this allowed enough time to review the electoral boundaries for the 51st New Zealand Parliament prior to the 2014 election. The Representation Commission undertook the review between October 2013 and April 2014 and changed the boundaries of 46 electorates, created two new electorates in the Auckland area, and abolished one electorate in Auckland. A total of twenty general and five Maori electorates remained unchanged.

== 2011 general election ==
The 2011 New Zealand general election was held on Saturday, 26 November 2011 and determined the membership of the 50th New Zealand Parliament.

One hundred and twenty-one MPs were elected to the New Zealand House of Representatives, 70 from single-member electorates, including one overhang seat, and 51 from party lists. Since the 1996 election, New Zealand has used the Mixed Member Proportional (MMP) voting system, giving voters two votes: one for a political party and the other for their local electorate MP. A referendum on the voting system was held at the same time as the election, in which 57.8% of voters voted to keep the MMP voting system.

A total of 3,070,847 people were registered to vote in the election, with over 2.2 million votes cast and a turnout of 73.83%—the lowest turnout since 1887. The poor turnout was partially explained with many voters expecting the outcome to be a foregone conclusion, and a similar attitude was observed in 2002, when the Labour Party was well ahead in the polls and a low turnout resulted.

The preliminary results published on election night indicated that the incumbent National Party, led by John Key gained the plurality with 47.99% of the party vote and 60 seats, one seat short of holding a majority. The opposing Labour Party, led by Phil Goff, lost ground winning 27.13% of the vote and 34 seats, while the Green Party won 10.62% of the vote and 13 seats—the biggest share of the party vote for a minor party since 1996. New Zealand First, having won no seats in 2008 due to its failure to either reach the 5% threshold or win an electorate, made a comeback with 6.81% of the vote entitling them to eight seats.

National's confidence and supply partners in the 49th Parliament meanwhile suffered losses. Preliminary results indicated that ACT New Zealand won less than a third of the party vote it received in 2008, reducing from five seats to one. The Māori Party was reduced from five seats to three, as the party vote split between the Māori Party and former Māori Party MP Hone Harawira's Mana Party. United Future lost party votes, but retained their one seat in Parliament.

The poor results for both the Labour Party and ACT resulted in changes to their leaderships. Labour leader Phil Goff and deputy Annette King announced on 29 November 2011 that they had tendered their resignations from the party leadership effective 13 December 2011, with both keeping their electorate representations. ACT leader Don Brash failed to get re-elected to Parliament due to the poor party vote and resigned his party leadership on the night of the election.

On 10 December, the final results were published after the counting of the special votes. The main changes were that the National Party's vote share had decreased to 47.31%, resulting in 59 seats—one less than the 60 based on the preliminary results. The Green Party vote rose to 11.06%, which gained it one seat and is now eligible for 14 seats. The redistribution of the seats means that the lowest-placed National member who qualified based on the preliminary results, Aaron Gilmore (a member of the 49th Parliament), was not returned again. The next person on the Green Party list, Mojo Mathers (a new MP), took the seat.

The Christchurch Central electorate, where the incumbent Brendon Burns (Labour) and Nicky Wagner (National) had received the same number of votes on election night, was won by Wagner with a majority of 45 votes, with Burns thus out of Parliament, as his list position is not high enough. In the Waitakere electorate, Labour's Carmel Sepuloni achieved a majority of 11 votes as opposed to a 349-vote majority for National's Paula Bennett as indicated by the preliminary results. Sepuloni would not have entered Parliament again without winning the electorate as her list placing was not high enough, meaning that she replaced the lowest-ranked Labour list candidate who qualified based on the preliminary results, Raymond Huo. However, both electorates were subject to a judicial recount at the request of the Labour and National Parties, respectively, due to the tightness of each result. As a result of the recount, Nicky Wagner was confirmed as the winner of Christchurch Central with a majority 47 votes on 14 December, while in Waitakere, the recount swung the seat back to Paula Bennett with a majority of nine votes on 17 December.

On election night, 25 new MPs entered Parliament. With the changes in seats for National and the Green Party once the final count was released, this increased to 26 new MPs, with Mathers having joined the newcomers. The final turnout of enrolled electors was 74.21%.

== Members ==
The tables below show the members of the 50th Parliament based on preliminary counts of the 2011 general election.

=== Overview ===
The table below shows the number of MPs in each party following the 2011 election and at dissolution:

Affiliation	Members	
Affiliation	At 2011 election	At dissolution
National	59	59
Māori Party (Note: The Māori Party, United Future and ACT once again entered into confidence and supply agreements with the National Party to form a majority.)	3	3
ACT	1	1
United Future	1	1
Government total	64	64
Labour	34	34
Green	14	14
NZ First	8	7
Mana Party	1	1
Independent Coalition	Not yet founded	1 (Note: Brendan Horan was an MP who was expelled from New Zealand First on 4 December 2012. He formed the NZ Independent Coalition and served the remainder of his term under that party.)
Opposition total	57	57
Total	121	121
Working Government majority (Note: The Working Government majority is calculated as all Government MPs minus all other parties.)	7	7

=== New Zealand National Party (59) ===
The National Party won 47.31% of the vote, entitling it to 59 seats. As it won 42 electorates, an additional 17 members were taken from the party list.

Nine new National Party members were elected, six from electorates and three from the party list. Fifty members from the 49th Parliament were returned.

Name	Electorate (list if blank)	Term in office	Portfolios & Responsibilities
David Carter		1994–	Speaker of the House (Jan 2013 onwards); Chairperson, Business Committee (Jan 2013 onwards); Chairperson, Officers of Parliament Committee (Jan 2013 onwards); Minister of Primary Industries (until Jan 2013); Minister of Local Government (Apr 2012 – Jan 2013)
Eric Roy	Invercargill	1993–2002; 2005–	Deputy Speaker of the House
Lindsay Tisch	Waikato	1999–	Assistant Speaker of the House
Ministers in Cabinet
John Key	Helensville	2002–	Prime Minister; Minister of Tourism; Minister Responsible for Ministerial Services; Minister in Charge of the NZ Security Intelligence Service; Minister in Charge of the Government Communications Security Bureau; Leader of the National Party
Bill English	Clutha-Southland	1990–	Deputy Prime Minister; Minister of Finance; Deputy Leader of the National Party
Gerry Brownlee	Ilam	1996–	Leader of the House; Minister for the Canterbury Earthquake Recovery Authority; Minister of Transport; Minister Responsible for the Earthquake Commission
Steven Joyce		2008–	Minister for Economic Development; Minister of Science and Innovation; Minister for Tertiary Education, Skills and Employment; Associate Minister of Finance
Judith Collins	Papakura	2002–	Minister of Justice; Minister for ACC; Minister for Ethnic Affairs
Tony Ryall	Bay of Plenty	1990–	Minister of Health; Minister for State Owned Enterprises
Hekia Parata		2008–	Minister of Education; Minister of Pacific Island Affairs
Chris Finlayson		2005–	Attorney-General; Minister for Treaty of Waitangi Negotiations; Minister for Arts, Culture and Heritage; Associate Minister of Maori Affairs; Chairperson, Privileges Committee
Paula Bennett	Waitakere	2005–	Minister for Social Development; Associate Minister for Housing; Minister of Youth Affairs (until Jan 2013)
Jonathan Coleman	Northcote	2005–	Minister of Defence; Minister of State Services; Associate Minister of Finance
Murray McCully	East Coast Bays	1987–	Minister of Foreign Affairs; Minister for Sport and Recreation
Anne Tolley	East Coast	1999–2002; 2005–	Minister of Police; Minister of Corrections; Deputy Leader of the House
Nick Smith	Nelson	1990–	Minister of Conservation; Minister for Housing
Tim Groser		2005–	Minister of Trade; Minister Responsible for International Climate Change Negotiations; Minister for Climate Change Issues; Associate Minister of Foreign Affairs
Amy Adams	Selwyn	2008–	Minister for Communications and Information Technology; Minister for the Environment; Associate Minister for Canterbury Earthquake Recovery
Nathan Guy	Ōtaki	2005–	Minister for Racing; Minister for Primary Industries
Craig Foss	Tukituki	2005–	Minister of Commerce; Minister of Broadcasting; Associate Minister for ACC; Minister of Consumer Affairs
Chris Tremain	Napier	2005–	Minister of Local Government; Minister of Internal Affairs; Associate Minister of Tourism
Simon Bridges	Tauranga	2008–	Minister of Labour; Minister for Energy and Resources; Associate Minister for Climate Change Issues
Nikki Kaye	Auckland Central	2008–	Minister for Food Safety; Minister of Civil Defence; Minister of Youth Affairs; Associate Minister of Education; Associate Minister of Immigration
Ministers outside Cabinet
Maurice Williamson	Pakuranga	1987–	Minister for Building and Construction; Minister of Customs; Minister for Land Information; Minister of Statistics
Jo Goodhew	Rangitata	2005–	Minister for the Community and Voluntary Sector; Minister for Senior Citizens; Minister of Women's Affairs; Associate Minister of Health; Associate Minister for Primary Industries
Chester Borrows	Whanganui	2005–	Minister of Courts; Associate Minister of Justice; Associate Minister of Social Development
Michael Woodhouse		2008–	Minister of Immigration; Minister for Veteran's Affairs; Associate Minister of Transport
Todd McClay	Rotorua	2008–	Minister of Revenue; Associate Minister of Health
Members of Parliament
Louise Upston	Taupō	2008–	Senior Whip; Caucus Representative to the National Board of Directors
Tim Macindoe	Hamilton West	2008–	Junior Whip; Chairperson, Justice and Electoral Committee
Jami-Lee Ross	Botany	2011–	Junior Whip (Third Whip); Baby of the House (Youngest MP); Deputy-Chairperson, Law and Order Committee; Deputy-Chairperson, Transport and Industrial Relations Committee
Melissa Lee		2008–	Parliamentary Private Secretary for Ethnic Affairs; Deputy-Chairperson, Social Services Committee
John Hayes	Wairarapa	2005–	Parliamentary Private Secretary of Foreign Affairs; Chairperson, Foreign Affairs, Defence and Trade Committee
Shane Ardern	Taranaki-King Country	1998–	Chairperson, Primary Production Committee
Chris Auchinvole		2005–	Deputy-Chairperson, Government Administration Committee
Kanwal Singh Bakshi		2008–	
Maggie Barry	North Shore	2011–	
David Bennett	Hamilton East	2005–	Chairperson, Transport and Industrial Relations Committee
Jackie Blue		2005–	Deputy-Chairperson, Health Committee
Cam Calder		2009–	Deputy-Chairperson, Justice and Electoral Committee
Jacqui Dean	Waitaki	2005–	Chairperson, Law and Order Committee
Paul Goldsmith		2011–	Chairperson, Finance and Expenditure Committee
Phil Heatley	Whangarei	1999–	
Tau Henare		1993–1999; 2005–	Chairperson, Maori Affairs Committee
Paul Hutchison	Hunua	1999–	Chairperson, Health Committee
Colin King	Kaikōura	2005–	Deputy-Chairperson, Education and Science Committee
Peseta Sam Lotu-Iiga	Maungakiekie	2008–	Chairperson, Social Services Committee
Ian McKelvie	Rangitīkei	2011–	
Mark Mitchell	Rodney	2011–	New Zealand Young Nationals Caucus Representative
Alfred Ngaro		2011–	
Simon O'Connor	Tāmaki	2011–	
Mike Sabin	Northland	2011–	
Katrina Shanks		2007–	Deputy-Chairperson, Regulations Review Committee
Scott Simpson	Coromandel	2011–	
Nicky Wagner	Christchurch Central	2005–	Chairperson, Local Government and Environment Committee; Blue Greens Caucus Representative
Kate Wilkinson	Waimakariri	2005–	
Jian Yang		2011–	
Jonathan Young	New Plymouth	2008–	Chairperson, Commerce Committee
Claudette Hauiti		2013–	Entered Parliament May 2013
Paul Foster-Bell		2013–	Entered Parliament May 2013
Jo Hayes		2014–	Entered Parliament January 2014
members of the National caucus who resigned, retired or died during the term of the 50th Parliament
Lockwood Smith		1984–2013	Resigned January 2013; Speaker of the House (until Jan 2013)
Aaron Gilmore		2008–2011; 2013	Returned to parliament January 2013; resigned May 2013
Jackie Blue		2005–2013	Resigned May 2013
Katrina Shanks		2007–2013	Resigned December 2013

=== New Zealand Labour Party (34) ===
The Labour Party won 27.48% of the vote, entitling it to 34 seats. As it won 22 electorates, an additional 12 members were taken from the party list.

Four new Labour Party members were elected, three from electorates and one from the list. Thirty members from the 49th Parliament were returned.

Name	Electorate (list if blank)	Term in office	Portfolios & Responsibilities
Shadow Cabinet
David Cunliffe	New Lynn	1999–	Leader of the Opposition; Leader of the Labour Party; Spokesperson for the Security Intelligence Service and Regional Development
David Parker		2002–	Deputy Leader of the Labour Party; Spokesperson for Finance
Grant Robertson	Wellington Central	2008–	Spokesperson for Economic Development, Employment, Skills and Training
Jacinda Ardern		2008–	Spokesperson for Social Development
Clayton Cosgrove		1999–	Spokesperson for State Owned Enterprises, Commerce, Small Business, and Trade Negotiations; Associate Spokesperson for Finance; Deputy-Chairperson, Commerce Committee
Nanaia Mahuta	Hauraki-Waikato	1996–	Spokesperson for Education; Associate Spokesperson for Māori Affairs
Maryan Street		2005–	Spokesperson for Health, and Disarmament and Arms Control; Associate Spokesperson for Foreign Affairs
William Sio	Mangere	2008–	Spokesperson for Employment, Pacific Island Affairs, and Inter-Faith Dialogue; Associate Spokesperson for Foreign Affairs
Phil Twyford	Te Atatū	2008–	Spokesperson for Transport and Auckland Issues; Associate Spokesperson for the Environment
Trevor Mallard	Hutt South	1984–1990; 1993–	Shadow Leader of the House; Spokesperson for the America's Cup; Associate Spokesperson for Finance
Chris Hipkins	Rimutaka	2008–	Senior Whip; Spokesperson for State Services; Associate Spokesperson for Education
Phil Goff	Mount Roskill	1981–1990; 1993–	Spokesperson for Foreign Affairs and Trade
Annette King	Rongotai	1984–1990; 1993–	Spokesperson for Housing, and Local Government
Darien Fenton		2005–	Junior Whip; Spokesperson for Labour, and Immigration
Damien O'Connor	West Coast-Tasman	1993–2008; 2009–	Spokesperson for Primary Industries, and Food Safety; Deputy-Chairperson, Primary Production Committee
Clare Curran	Dunedin South	2008–	Spokesperson for Communications and Information Technology, Broadcasting, Open Government, and Disability Issues
Members of Parliament
David Shearer	Mount Albert	2009–	
Ross Robertson	Manukau East	1987–	Assistant Speaker of the House; Spokesperson for Racing; Associate Spokesperson for Disarmament and Arms Control (Small Arms)
David Clark	Dunedin North	2011–	Spokesperson for Revenue; Associate Spokesperson for Tertiary Education
Ruth Dyson	Port Hills	1993–	Spokesperson for Conservation, Internal Affairs and Senior Citizens; Chairperson, Government Administration Committee
Kris Faafoi	Mana	2010–	Spokesperson for Police, and Customs; Associate Spokesperson for Health
Raymond Huo		2008–	Spokesperson for Building and Construction, Statistics and Land Information
Iain Lees-Galloway	Palmerston North	2008–	Spokesperson for Defence, Transport Safety and Veteran's Affairs; Associate Spokesperson for Health
Andrew Little		2011–	Spokesperson for ACC
Moana Mackey		2003–	Spokesperson for Energy, and Climate Change Issues
Sue Moroney		2005–	Spokesperson for Early Childhood Education, and Women's Affairs
Rajen Prasad		2008–	Spokesperson for Ethnic Affairs; Associate Spokesperson for Social Development
Rino Tirikatene	Te Tai Tonga	2011–	Spokesperson for Tourism
Louisa Wall	Manurewa	2008; 2011–	Spokesperson for Sport and Recreation, and the Community and Voluntary Sector
Megan Woods	Wigram	2011–	Spokesperson for Youth Affairs; Associate Spokesperson for Science and Innovation
Carol Beaumont		2008–2011; 2013–	* Returned to Parliament as a List MP, replacing Charles Chauvel
Meka Whaitiri		2013–	* Elected to Parliament in a by-election, replacing Parekura Horomia
Poto Williams		2013–	* Elected to Parliament in a by-election, replacing Lianne Dalziel
members of the Labour caucus who resigned, retired or died during the term of the 50th Parliament
Charles Chauvel		2006–2013	Resigned March 2013, replaced by Carol Beaumont; Shadow Attorney General; Spokesperson for Justice, Courts, Corrections, and Arts, Culture and Heritage; Chairperson, Regulations Review Committee
Parekura Horomia	Ikaroa-Rāwhiti	1999–2013	Died 29 April 2013, replaced by Meka Whaitiri; Spokesperson for Maori Affairs, and Treaty Of Waitangi Negotiations; Deputy-Chairperson, Maori Affairs Committee
Lianne Dalziel	Christchurch East	1990–	Spokesperson for Canterbury Earthquake Recovery, Civil Defence and Emergency Management, Earthquake Commission, and Consumer Rights and Standards; Associate Spokesperson for Justice; Resigned to contest Christchurch mayoralty, replaced by Poto Williams

=== Green Party of Aotearoa New Zealand (14) ===
The Green Party won 11.06% of the vote, entitling it to 14 seats. As it did not win any electorate, all members were taken from the party list.

Seven new Green Party members were elected, with seven members from the 49th Parliament returning.

Mojo Mathers, elected as number 14 on the list, is New Zealand's first profoundly deaf MP.

Name	Electorate (list if blank)	Term in office	Portfolios & Responsibilities
Russel Norman		2008–	Co-leader of the Green Party; Spokesperson for Environment; Spokesperson for Economics & Finance
Metiria Turei		2002–	Co-leader of the Green Party; Spokesperson for Social Equity; Spokesperson for Electoral Reform; Spokesperson for Māori and Treaty Issues; Spokesperson for Housing; Spokesperson for Children
Steffan Browning		2011–	Spokesperson for Agriculture; Spokesperson for Fisheries; Spokesperson for Organics; Spokesperson for GE; Spokesperson for Forestry; Spokesperson for Biosecurity & Customs; Spokesperson for Security & Intelligence
David Clendon		2009–	Spokesperson for Small Business; Spokesperson for Corrections and Courts; Spokesperson for Tertiary Education; Spokesperson for Research & Technology; Spokesperson for Police; Spokesperson for Commerce; Spokesperson for Tourism
Catherine Delahunty		2008–	Spokesperson for Education; Spokesperson for Mining (Terrestrial); Spokesperson for Toxics; Spokesperson for Te Tiriti o Waitangi
Julie Anne Genter		2011–	Spokesperson for Transport; Spokesperson for Justice; Spokesperson for Broadcasting
Kennedy Graham		2008–	Spokesperson for Disarmament; Spokesperson for Global Affairs; Spokesperson for Climate Change; Spokesperson for Trade & Foreign Investment; Spokesperson for Constitutional Issues; Spokesperson for Defence; Spokesperson for Population
Kevin Hague		2008–	Spokesperson for Health and Wellbeing; Spokesperson for Commerce; Spokesperson for Small Business; Spokesperson for Tourism; Spokesperson for Biosecurity & Customs; Spokesperson for Cycling & Active Transport; Spokesperson for Sport & Recreation; Spokesperson for Rainbow Issues (co-spokesperson); Spokesperson for Rural Affairs; associate spokesperson on Community Economic Development, Gambling, and Community & Voluntary Sector
Gareth Hughes		2010–	Musterer (Party Whip); Spokesperson for Energy; Spokesperson for Oceans; Spokesperson for Mining (oceans); Spokesperson for ICT; Spokesperson for Libraries & Archives
Jan Logie		2011–	Spokesperson for Income Support; Spokesperson for Immigration; Spokesperson for Women; Spokesperson for Pacific Island Affairs; Spokesperson for Ethnic Affairs; Spokesperson for Human Rights; Spokesperson for Rainbow Issues (co-spokesperson); Spokesperson for Overseas Development Aid
Mojo Mathers		2011–	Spokesperson for Food; Spokesperson for Animal Welfare; Spokesperson for Disability Issues; Spokesperson for Consumer Affairs; Spokesperson for Civil Defence; Spokesperson for Natural Health
Denise Roche		2011–	Spokesperson for Industrial Relations; Spokesperson for Community & Voluntary sector; Spokesperson for Community Economic Development; Spokesperson for Waste; Spokesperson for Gambling; Spokesperson for Auckland; Spokesperson for State Services
Eugenie Sage		2011–	Spokesperson for Environment; Spokesperson for Conservation; Spokesperson for Water; Spokesperson for Local Government; Spokesperson for Christchurch; Spokesperson for Land Information; Spokesperson for Resource Management issues
Holly Walker		2011–	Spokesperson for Housing; Spokesperson for Electoral Reform; Spokesperson for Children; Spokesperson for Open Government; Spokesperson for Arts Culture & Heritage; Spokesperson for Youth & Students

=== New Zealand First (7) ===
New Zealand First won 6.59% of the vote, entitling it to eight seats. As it did not win any electorate, all members were taken from the party list. Six new members were elected, in addition to two former members.

The party was reduced to seven MPs when it expelled Brendan Horan in December 2012. Horan remained in Parliament as an independent MP.

Name	Electorate (list if blank)	Term in office	Portfolios & Responsibilities
Winston Peters		1979–1981; 1984–2008; 2011–	Leader of New Zealand First; Spokesperson, Broadcasting; Spokesperson, Climate Change; Spokesperson, Defence; Spokesperson, Economic Development; Spokesperson, Finance; Spokesperson, Foreign Affairs; Spokesperson, Immigration; Spokesperson, Maori Affairs; Spokesperson, Racing; Spokesperson, Security Issues; Spokesperson, Senior Citizens; Spokesperson, State Owned Enterprises; Spokesperson, Trade; Spokesperson, Treaty of Waitangi Issues
Tracey Martin		2011–	Spokesperson, Arts, Culture and Heritage; Spokesperson, Communications and IT; Spokesperson, Education; Spokesperson, Research, Science and Technology (including CRIs); Spokesperson, Women's Affairs; Spokesperson, Youth Affairs
Denis O'Rourke		2011–	Spokesperson, Attorney-General; Spokesperson, Christchurch Earthquake Issues; Spokesperson, Civil Defence and Emergency Services; Spokesperson, Constitutional Review; Spokesperson, Housing; Spokesperson, Justice; Spokesperson, State Services; Spokesperson, Transport; Associate Spokesperson, Climate Change; Associate Spokesperson, Economic Development; Associate Spokesperson, Local Government
Richard Prosser		2011–	Spokesperson, Agriculture; Spokesperson, Biosecurity; Spokesperson, Customs; Spokesperson, Fisheries; Spokesperson, Forestry; Spokesperson, Outdoor Recreation; Spokesperson, Police; Associate Spokesperson, Defence; Associate Spokesperson, Veterans' Affairs
Barbara Stewart		2002–2008; 2011–	Party Whip; Spokesperson, ACC; Spokesperson, Disability Issues; Spokesperson, Family Affairs; Spokesperson, Health; Spokesperson, Labour and Industrial Relations; Spokesperson, Tourism; Associate Spokesperson, Senior Citizens
Asenati Taylor		2011–	Spokesperson, Corrections; Spokesperson, Ethnic Affairs; Spokesperson, Pacific Island Affairs; Spokesperson, Social Policy / Welfare; Associate Spokesperson, Housing
Andrew Williams		2011–	Spokesperson, Building and Construction; Spokesperson, Commerce; Spokesperson, Consumer Affairs; Spokesperson, Conservation; Spokesperson, Energy; Spokesperson, Environment / RMA; Spokesperson, Internal Affairs; Spokesperson, Local Government; Spokesperson, Revenue; Spokesperson, Sports and Recreation; Spokesperson, Veterans' Affairs; Associate Spokesperson, Finance; Associate Spokesperson, Foreign Affairs and Trade; Associate Spokesperson, SOEs
members of the NZ First caucus who resigned, retired or died during the term of the 50th Parliament
Brendan Horan		2011–2012	Expelled from party; remained in Parliament as an Independent

=== Māori Party (3) ===
The Māori Party won 1.43% of the vote, which is short of the 5% threshold. The Māori Party won three electorates and will thus be represented by three electorate MPs. The 1.43% party vote share entitles the party to two seats and with three electorates won, an overhang was caused, increasing the size of the 50th Parliament to 121 seats.

Name	Electorate (list if blank)	Term in office	Portfolios & Responsibilities
Pita Sharples	Tāmaki Makaurau	2005–	Minister for Māori Affairs; Associate Minister of Education; Associate Minister of Corrections; Co-leader of the Māori Party
Tariana Turia	Te Tai Hauāuru	1996–	Minister for Disability Issues; Minister Responsible for Whānau Ora; Associate Minister of Health; Associate Minister of Housing; Associate Minister for Social Development; Associate Minister for Tertiary Education, Skills and Employment; Co-leader of the Māori Party
Te Ururoa Flavell	Waiāriki	2005–	

=== Mana Party (1) ===
The Mana Party won 1.08% of the vote, which is short of the 5% threshold. Mana won one electorate and will thus be represented by one electorate MP. The 1.08% party vote share entitles the party to one seat.

Name	Electorate (list if blank)	Term in office	Portfolios & Responsibilities
Hone Harawira	Te Tai Tokerau	2005–	Leader of the Mana Party

=== United Future (1) ===
United Future won 0.60% of the vote, which is short of the 5% threshold. United Future won one electorate and will thus be represented by one electorate MP. The 0.61% party vote share entitles the party to one seat.

Name	Electorate (list if blank)	Term in office	Portfolios & Responsibilities
Peter Dunne	Ōhariu	1984–	Minister of Revenue; Associate Minister of Conservation; Associate Minister of Health; Leader of United Future; Father of the House

=== NZ Independent Coalition (1) ===
Name	Electorate	Term in office	Responsibilities
Brendan Horan		2012–2014	Remained in Parliament as an MP for the NZ Independent Coalition after expulsion from the NZ First party

=== ACT New Zealand (0) ===
ACT New Zealand won 1.07% of the vote, which is short of the 5% threshold. ACT won one electorate and was thus represented by one electorate MP. The 1.07% party vote share entitled the party to one seat. Their sole MP resigned from Parliament on 13 June 2014.

Name	Electorate (list if blank)	Term in office	Portfolios & Responsibilities
members of the ACT caucus who resigned during the term of the 50th Parliament
John Banks	Epsom	1981–1999; 2011–	Minister of Regulatory Reform; Minister of Small Business; Associate Minister of Commerce; Associate Minister of Education

== Parliamentary business ==
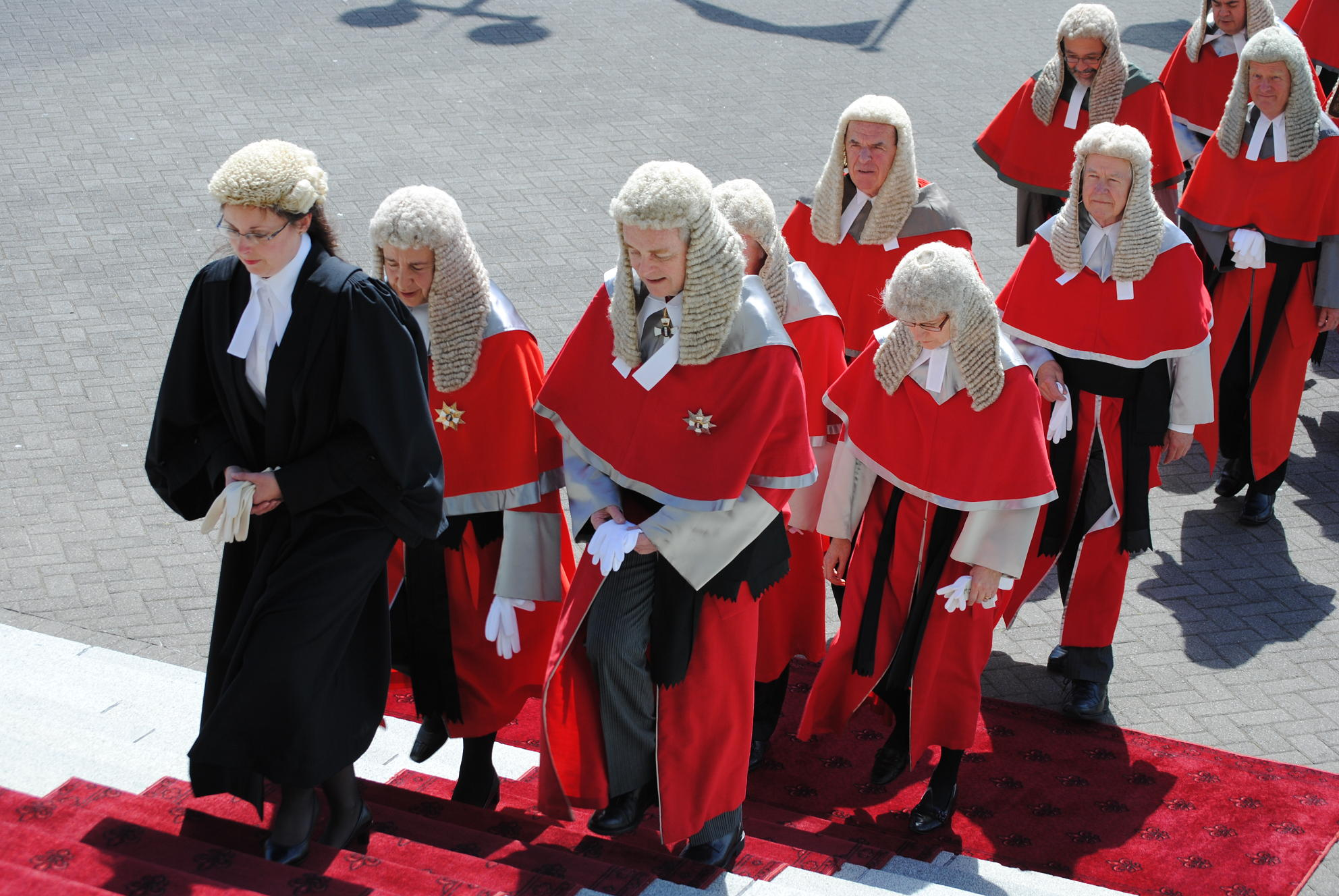
Senior members of the judiciary, led by the Chief Justice Sian Elias (second from left), at the State Opening of Parliament

The first sitting of the 50th Parliament was on 20 December 2011, with its main business the swearing in of new members and the election of the speaker. The State Opening was held on the following day by the Governor-General, Sir Jerry Mateparae.

== By-elections during 50th Parliament ==
There were a number of changes during the term of the 50th Parliament.

Electorate and by-election		Date	Incumbent	Cause	Winner
Ikaroa-Rāwhiti	2013	29 June	Parekura Horomia	Death	Meka Whaitiri
Christchurch East	2013	30 November	Lianne Dalziel	Resignation; elected Mayor of Christchurch	Poto Williams

=== Summary of changes during term ===
- Lockwood Smith (National, List) resigned in January 2013 and replaced by Aaron Gilmore
- Charles Chauvel (Labour, List) resigned in March 2013, and was replaced by Carol Beaumont
- Parekura Horomia (Labour, Ikaroa-Rāwhiti) died on 29 April 2013. The resulting by-election on 29 June 2013 was won by Meka Whaitiri
- Aaron Gilmore (National, List) resigned in May 2013 and was replaced by Claudette Hauiti
- Jackie Blue (National, List) resigned in May 2013 and was replaced by Paul Foster-Bell
- Peter Dunne (United Future, Ōhariu) was regarded as an independent member from June until August 2013 while his party was temporarily deregistered
- Lianne Dalziel (Labour, Christchurch East) resigned in September 2013 to contest the Christchurch mayoralty election. The resulting by-election on 30 November was won by Poto Williams
- Katrina Shanks (National, List) resigned in December 2013 and was replaced by Jo Hayes
- John Banks (ACT, Epsom) resigned in June 2014. Due to the 2014 general election, no by-election was held.
- Shane Jones (Labour, List) left Parliament in May 2014. He was replaced by Kelvin Davis.

== Seating plan ==
=== Start of term ===
The chamber is in a horseshoe-shape.

													Tirikatene	Woods	Roche	Genter
R. Robertson	Curran	D. O'Connor	Dyson	Moroney	Lees-Galloway	Mackey	Prasad	Horomia	Faafoi	Huo	Wall	Clark	Little	Lole-Taylor		Browning	Walker
A. King	Goff	Fenton	Hipkins	Mallard	Street	Sio	Twyford	Chauvel	Dalziel	Martin	Williams	Prosser	Horan		O'Rourke	Logie	Yang
Jones	Mahuta	G. Robertson	Shearer	Parker	J. Ardern	Cunliffe	Cosgrove	Harawira	Peters	Stewart	Hague	Norman		Mathers	Sage	Clendon	Simpson
													Turei	Hughes	Graham
L. Smith															Delahunty
L. Smith															Young
													Turia	Flavell	Wagner
Finlayson	P. Bennett	English	KEY	Brownlee	Joyce	Collins	Ryall	Parata	Carter	Banks	Dunne	Sharples		Hayes	Shanks	Barry	Sabin
Guy	McCully	Upston	Woodhouse	Tolley	Coleman	Groser	Heatley	Wilkinson	Lee	S. Ardern	D. Bennett	N. Smith	Dean		Ross	Bakshi	S. O'Connor
Roy	Tisch	Foss	Adams	Williamson	Tremain	Goodhew	Borrows	Bridges	Henare	Hutchison	Kaye	Lotu-liga	McClay	Macindoe	Calder	C. King	Ngaro
													Auchinvole	Blue	Goldsmith	McKelvie	Mitchell

=== End of term ===
The chamber is in a horseshoe-shape.

													Whaitiri	P. Williams	Horan	Genter
R. Robertson	Mackey	D. O'Connor	Clark	Faafoi	Beaumont	Woods	Fenton	Mallard	Dyson	Curran	Prasad	Huo	Tirikatene	Lole-Taylor		Roche	Walker
Twyford	Mahuta	Lees-Galloway	Moroney	Street	Sio	Shearer	Goff	Wall	Little	Stewart	A. Williams	Prosser	Mathers		O'Rourke	Browning	Jo Hayes
Hipkins	Cosgrove	Parker	Cunliffe	G. Robertson	A. King	Jones	J. Ardern	Harawira	Peters	Martin	Hague	Norman		Hughes	Clendon	Logie	Hauiti
													Turei	Delahunty	Sage
Carter															Graham
Carter															Goldsmith
													Turia	Sharples	Young
Finlayson	P. Bennett	English	KEY	Brownlee	Joyce	Collins	Ryall	Parata	Coleman	Banks	Dunne	Flavell		Ross	Wagner	Barry	Foster-Bell
Guy	McCully	Macindoe	Upston	Tolley	N. Smith	Groser	Adams	Foss	Lotu-liga	S. Ardern	D. Bennett	John Hayes	Dean		Yang	Bakshi	Sabin
Roy	Tisch	Bridges	Kaye	Woodhouse	Williamson	Goodhew	Borrows	McClay	Henare	Hutchison	Heatley	Wilkinson	Tremain	Lee	Calder	C. King	S. O'Connor
													Auchinvole	Simpson	McKelvie	Mitchell	Ngaro

== See also ==
- Party lists in the 2011 New Zealand general election
- Opinion polling for the 2011 New Zealand general election
- Politics of New Zealand
