= Matt Doocey =

New Zealand politician (born 1972)

The Honourable Matt Doocey MP
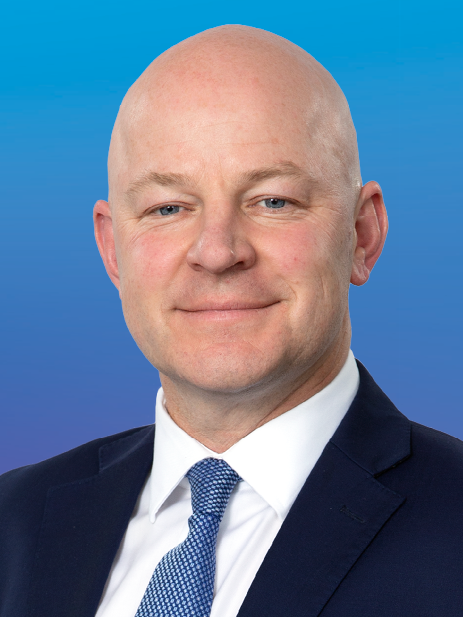
- Doocey in 2023

1st Minister for Mental Health
- Incumbent
- Assumed office 27 November 2023
- Prime Minister: Christopher Luxon
- Preceded by: Office established

17th Minister for ACC
- In office 27 November 2023 – 24 January 2025
- Prime Minister: Christopher Luxon
- Preceded by: Peeni Henare
- Succeeded by: Andrew Bayly

39th Minister of Tourism and Hospitality
- In office 27 November 2023 – 24 January 2025
- Prime Minister: Christopher Luxon
- Preceded by: Peeni Henare
- Succeeded by: Louise Upston

17th Minister for Youth
- In office 27 November 2023 – 24 January 2025
- Prime Minister: Christopher Luxon
- Preceded by: Willow-Jean Prime
- Succeeded by: James Meager

Senior Whip of the National Party
- In office 10 November 2020 – 7 December 2021
- Deputy: Maureen Pugh
- Leader: Judith Collins; Christopher Luxon
- Preceded by: Barbara Kuriger
- Succeeded by: Chris Penk

Member of the New Zealand Parliament for Waimakariri
- Incumbent
- Assumed office 20 September 2014
- Preceded by: Kate Wilkinson

Personal details
- Born: 1972 (age 53–54) Canterbury
- Relations: Philip Carter (uncle)
- Children: 2

Matthew Maurice Doocey (born 1972) is a New Zealand politician who was elected to the New Zealand Parliament at the 2014 general election as a representative of the New Zealand National Party. He was re-elected in 2017 with a majority increase of over 10,000 which was a significant increase from a majority of 2,500 in 2014. It was reported that this was the largest personal vote increase in the country.

== Political career ==
New Zealand Parliament
Years	Term	Electorate	List	Party
2014–2017	51st	Waimakariri	56	National
2017–2020	52nd	Waimakariri	29	National
2020–2023	53rd	Waimakariri	31	National
2023–2026	54th	Waimakariri	8	National
2026–present	55th	Waimakariri	12	National

=== Early political career ===
Doocey stood in the 2013 Christchurch East by-election placing second behind Poto Williams. At the time, Doocey was a manager for the Canterbury District Health Board. The party's Canterbury Westland Regional Chair, Roger Bridge, noted that a sitting government has never won a by-election in an electorate that it did not already hold. Bridge later conceded that it would be "very, very hard for us to win". When Kate Wilkinson, National MP for the Waimakariri electorate, announced in early November 2013 that she would retire at the end of the term of the 50th Parliament, rumours immediately surfaced that Doocey is going to replace her as the candidate in the Waimakariri electorate, and the Christchurch East by-election was for him to gain experience in contesting an election.

=== In government, 2014–2017 ===
Doocey left his job in June 2014 to focus on the Waimakariri election campaign. He beat the Labour Party's candidate Clayton Cosgrove with an increased majority compared to the 2011 election.

For the 51st New Zealand Parliament Doocey was appointed Deputy Chair of the Social Services Select Committee. In 2016 he brought a cross-party delegation of the Social Services Select Committee to Canterbury to hear from service providers about their response to communities’ psycho-social recovery needs in post-earthquake Canterbury. Also in his first term, Doocey was appointed the third Whip of the National Government.

During the 2017 general election, Doocey retained his seat in Waimakariri by a margin of 10,766 votes.

=== In opposition, 2017–2023 ===
For the 52nd New Zealand Parliament, Doocey served as National's Junior Whip, working closely with the Party's Senior Whip. He was also appointed Spokesperson for Mental Health and was National's Associate Spokesperson for Health, and a member of the Health Select Committee.

As National's first Spokesperson for Mental Health, in 2018, Doocey wrote to every political party in Parliament to invite them to join a cross-party approach to mental health that would focus on developing solutions and policy over a longer period than the Parliamentary three-year term. Doocey believed that by initiating a bipartisan approach to mental health this would break down some of the barriers to progress to improve mental health outcomes in New Zealand. However, Labour and the Greens rejected National's offer for a cross-party approach to mental health.

On 28 August 2019, John Kirwan launched the Mental Health and Addictions Wellbeing cross-party group, with the executive consisting of Matt Doocey, Louisa Wall (Labour), Chlöe Swarbrick (Green Party), Jenny Marcroft (New Zealand First) and David Seymour (ACT), to work together to improve mental health and wellbeing in New Zealand.

During the 2020 general election, Doocey retained Waimakariri for the National Party by a final margin of 1,507 votes. He was named Backbencher of the Year in Stuff's political awards 2020, and following the election, the National caucus elected him as its Senior Whip on 10 November. He served in this role until December 2021, when he joined the National Party front bench under the new leader Christopher Luxon.

=== In government, 2023–present ===
During the 2023 New Zealand general election, Doocey retained the Waimakariri electorate, winning his greatest majority yet of 13,010 votes.

Following the formation of the National-led coalition government in late November 2023, Doocey was named Minister for Mental Health, the Accident Compensation Corporation (ACC), Tourism and Hospitality, and Youth, and appointed Associate Minister of Health and Transport. He was also appointed to Prime Minister Christopher Luxon's Cabinet.

==== Health issues ====
In late November 2023, Doocey as Minister for Mental Health received a copy of the Royal Commission of Inquiry into Abuse in Care's interim report into systemic abuse by the Catholic Brothers Hospitallers of St John of God in Christchurch between the 1950s and 1990s. During a meeting with abuse survivors in May 2024, Doocey admitted not reading the interim report. In response to criticism, Prime Minister Christopher Luxon reiterated the Government's commitment to addressing the needs of abuse survivors.

In mid June 2025, Doocey as Mental Health Minister confirmed that the Government was investing NZ$36 million into a four-year mental health prevention plan including a suicide prevention community fund, peer support workers in eight emergency departments, six crisis recovery cafes, and improving the suicide bereavement services.

In early July 2025 Doocey, as Associate Health Minister with responsibility for rural health and Mental Health Minister, undertook a rural health roadshow and visited 12 rural locations. On 3 July, he announced the launch of a mental health crisis support service in Oamaru from August 2025.

In November 2025, the Government announced they were delivering more frontline workers and establishing new services for people in need of a better crisis response. The crisis package announced included 40 additional frontline clinical staff for crisis assessment and treatment teams, two new 10-bed peer-led acute alternative services to reduce inpatient ward admissions and more Crisis Recovery Cafes and Peer Support Workers in ED.

In December 2025, the Government started work on making the process of registering a stillbirth more compassionate and supportive for grieving parents. Doocey said that for too long, families had no choice but to complete stillbirth registrations through the same online process designed for parents welcoming home a healthy newborn. He said he wanted to alleviate unnecessary pain at an already traumatic and distressing time for bereaved parents.

In January 2026, Doocey announced the first four new mental health co-response team locations that will work alongside Police to respond to 111 calls, saying co-response teams were part of the Government’s mental health plan to deliver faster access to support, more frontline workers, and a better crisis response.

Also in January 2026, Doocey released new workforce data that showed the frontline mental health and addiction workforce has grown significantly and vacancy rates have decreased. Data included Health New Zealand seeing an increase of more than 11 per cent of full-time equivalent mental health and addiction workers and mental health registered nurse vacancies falling from almost 15 per cent in 2023 to just over 7 per cent.

The following month, Doocey welcomed changes to who can assess, diagnose, and start ADHD treatment. The changes meant adults could be diagnosed by specialist GPs and nurse practitioners, while nurse practitioners working in paediatric or child and adolescent mental health teams could now diagnose and start treatment. Prior to this announcement, GPs and nurse practitioners could only prescribe ADHD medicines to patients with a written recommendation from a paediatrician or psychiatrist, or after someone had already been diagnosed and received their first prescription.

==== Tourism ====
On 3 September 2024, Doocey as Tourism Minister announced that the International Visitor Conservation and Tourism Levy (IVL) on most international tourists would be raised from NZ$35 to NZ$100 from 1 October 2024. The previous Labour Government had introduced the tourism levy in 2019 to fund public services and tourism sites. While in opposition, National had opposed the policy but had done a policy u-turn after coming into government, with Doocey saying that tourists should "contribute more to New Zealand." The tourism levy hike was opposed by the Tourism Industry Aotearoa representative body, which said that the levy would create a "significant barrier" for tourists.

During a cabinet reshuffle on 19 January 2025, Doocey lost his ACC, Tourism and hospitality, and Youth ministerial portfolios but retained his Mental Health and Associate Health portfolios.

==== 2026 general election ====
During the 2026 New Zealand general election, Doocey contested the Waimakariri electorate for National. He was ranked 12th on the National Party list. Doocey retained Waimakariri by a landslide margin of 11,283 votes.

== Personal life ==
Doocey is a member of the well-known Carter family. Family patriarch Maurice Carter, a Christchurch City Councillor for over 30 years (1956–1989), was his grandfather, and the former Speaker of the House of Representatives, David Carter, is his uncle. Tim Carter of Carter Group, a major property development company, is his cousin. Philip Carter, the father of Tim, is an uncle.

Doocey grew up in Christchurch and attended St Bede's College for his secondary schooling. The Dooceys bought their current home in Rangiora, which currently falls into the Waimakariri electorate, in April 2014 after boundary changes put his former Redwood home out of the electorate.

Doocey worked in mental health and healthcare management in both New Zealand and the UK. He studied Counselling Psychology at Weltech, has a BSc (Hons) in Social Policy, an MA in Healthcare Management from Kingston University in London and an MSc in Global Politics from Birkbeck, University of London.

New Zealand Parliament
Preceded by Kate Wilkinson	Member of Parliament for Waimakariri; 2014–present	Incumbent
