= Richard Prosser =

New Zealand politician (1967–2022)

Member of the New Zealand Parliament for New Zealand First party list
- In office 26 November 2011 – 23 September 2017

Personal details
- Born: Richard Ivor Prosser; 15 January 1967 Henderson, Auckland, New Zealand
- Died: 10 June 2022 (aged 55) London, England
- Party: New Zealand First (2010–2017)
- Children: Olivia Prosser, Gabrielle Prosser

Richard Ivor Prosser (15 January 1967 – 10 June 2022) was a New Zealand politician, writer, and winemaker. He was a member of New Zealand First party and was a Member of parliament from 2011 to 2017. While in Parliament, he voted against the Marriage Amendment Bill, which allowed same sex marriage. He attracted international attention in 2013 when he called for all young men who were Muslim or who "look like a Muslim" to be banned from Western airlines.

== Early life ==
Prosser was born in Henderson, Auckland, on 15 January 1967. He grew up in Waikato and attended Hauraki Plains College. Prosser lived in Britain for several years before returning to New Zealand in 1990. His work, prior to Parliament, included photographic technician, barman, engineering contractor, truck driver and sales representative. Prosser also trained as a Reiki Master. He moved to Otago in 1994 and took up wine making, and obtained a Certificate in Grapegrowing and Winemaking from Eastern Institute of Technology in 2001. By 2011 he was based in Canterbury, working as the South Island business development manager for an irrigation firm.

== Political career ==
New Zealand Parliament
Years	Term	Electorate	List	Party
2011–2014	50th	List	4	NZ First
2014–2017	51st	List	3	NZ First

=== Early unsuccessful elections ===
Prosser stood for the Democrats for Social Credit in the 2005 election in the Otago electorate. He was ranked fourth on their party list; the party received 0.05% of the party vote and did not get any MPs elected. Prosser also ran in the 2007 Central Otago District local elections, both for mayor and for councillor for the Earnscleugh-Manuherikia Ward. In both elections, he came last out of three candidates.

Prosser said that he wanted to restart the South Island Party, a political party which contested the 1999 general election. He founded a "pressure group" of the same name, which was active around 2008, but it did not register as a political party. Instead, Prosser helped promote South Island First, another pressure group.

=== Member of Parliament ===
Prosser joined New Zealand First in 2010 after attending a party meeting. He was later elected to the party's board of directors, and then selected as a parliamentary candidate for the 2011 election. He was ranked fourth on their party list. He also ran as a candidate for the Waimakariri electorate. While he only received 588 electorate coming last of five candidates, New Zealand First received 6.59% of the party vote and so Prosser won a list seat in the 50th Parliament. For the 2014 general election he was ranked third on the party list and retained his seat. However, for the 2017 general election, he was demoted to 15th on the list, which was too low to secure another term.

His roles in Parliament included membership of the select committees for Law and Order, Primary Production, and Social Services. He was New Zealand First's spokesperson on various issues over the years, including agriculture, fisheries, forestry, and police.

=== Political positions ===
For at least fourteen years, Prosser called for South Island separatism of some sort. As of 2007, Prosser was calling for a separate South Island Parliament. As of 2011 he still believed that South Island self-determination would come in some form, though felt it would be "generations away".

Prosser advocated banning the burqa in New Zealand, saying "This is my culture and my country, not yours. Get some respect and conform." He also advocated compulsory military training, calling those who would object "the pacifists, the weaklings, the other cowards and bludgers". He also called for arming bank tellers, dairy owners and taxi drivers.

In 2013, Prosser voted against the Marriage Amendment Bill, which aimed to permit same sex marriage in New Zealand, with all of his fellow New Zealand First MPs. Prosser said that he had ''nothing against gays'' but would vote against the bill to ''preserve the institution of marriage''.

In May 2020, Prosser claimed on his website that the COVID-19 pandemic was a global conspiracy intended to transfer greater power to financial and political elites.

== Writing career ==
Prosser wrote the 'Eyes Right' column in the Investigate magazine for ten years. In his columns, he suggested various political ideas including compulsory conscription in New Zealand.

Prosser released the book Uncommon Dissent in January 2012 outlining his political opinions, in which he refers to himself as a "Kiwi Nationalist". His claims in the book that "New Zealand society, Western society in general, has been hijacked by a conspiracy of Silly Little Girls" attracted heavy criticism from the Wellington Young Feminists Collective and the feminist blog Hand Mirror.

Writing for Investigate magazine in February 2013, Prosser stated; "If you are a young male, aged between say about 19 and about 35, and you're a Muslim, or you look like a Muslim, or you come from a Muslim country, then you are not welcome to travel on any of the West's airlines". Prosser further stated that the rights of New Zealanders' were being "denigrated by a sorry pack of misogynist troglodytes from Wogistan, threatening our way of life and security of travel in the name of their stone age religion, its barbaric attitudes towards women, democracy, and individual choice". Prosser wrote that "Abdul" should not be allowed to fly, and should instead "go ride a camel". It subsequently emerged that Prosser's column was written after a pocket-knife he was carrying had been confiscated by airport security. NZ First leader Winston Peters initially said that he would not apologise for Prosser's conduct, that he had been writing in his capacity as a columnist, as opposed to an MP, that Prosser stood by his statements, and that he had spoken to Prosser about the article as the article "lacked balance".

Subsequently, Prosser came under criticism from the Government and Opposition parties for the content of his article. Prosser stated that his intention had been to draw attention to the issue of passenger profiling at airports, and stated that his writing style was intentionally one of a "shock jock". He initially refused to apologise, but later admitted his article lacked balance, apologising for the offence that he had caused. He stated he would not continue to write for Investigate magazine.

In March 2013 the United Nations' Committee on the Elimination of Racial Discrimination said it "regrets" Prosser's remarks, and "welcomes the strong criticism of such statements by the Minister of Justice and Ethnic Affairs and the Race Relations Commissioner, among others".

== Personal life ==
As of 2011, Prosser's partner was Mel Francis, and the two had a two-year-old daughter and another child on the way.

Prosser died in London, England, on 10 June 2022, aged 55.
