= Denise Roche =

New Zealand politician

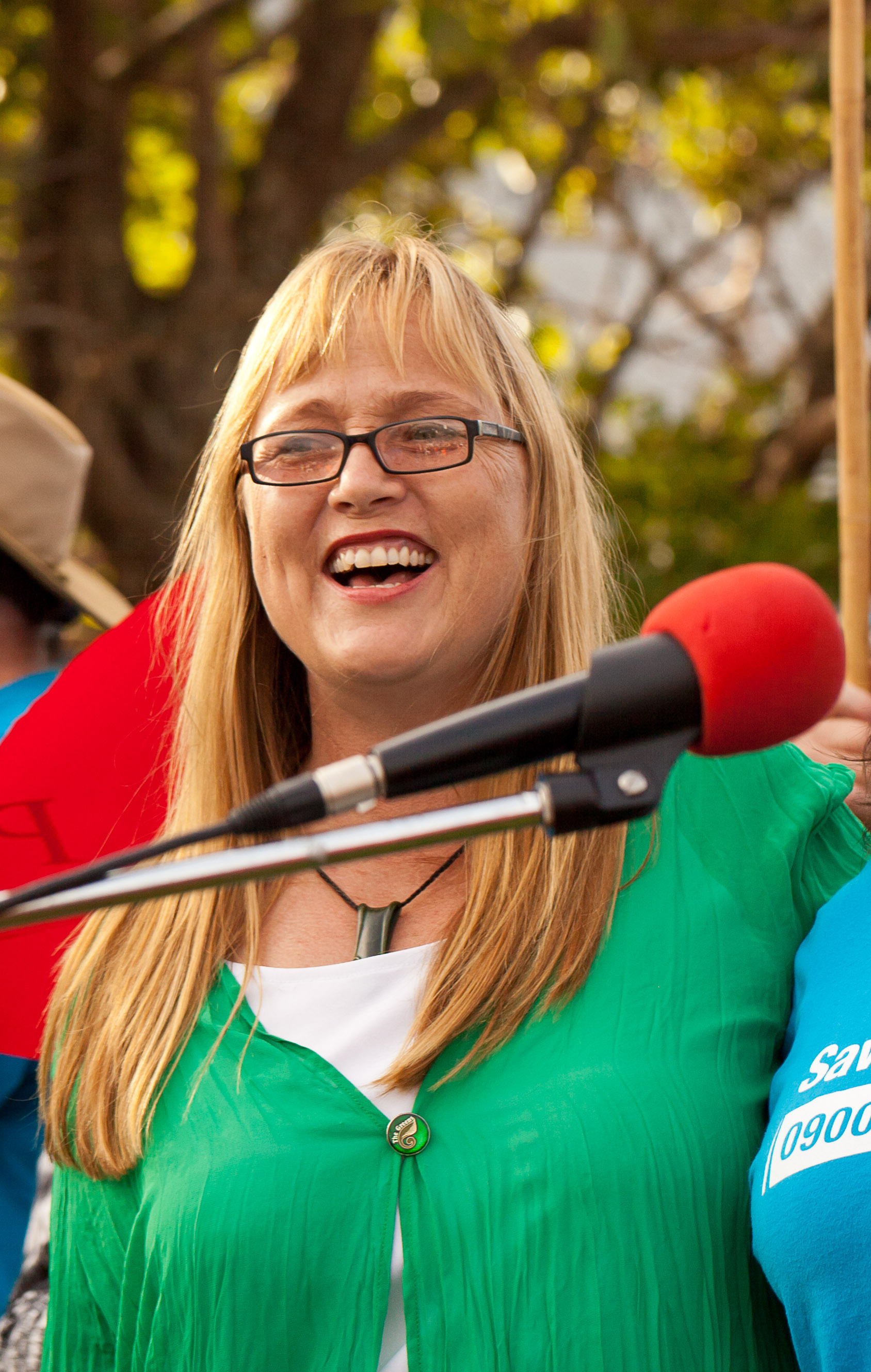
- Roche in 2007

Member of the New Zealand Parliament for Green party list
- In office 26 November 2011 – 23 September 2017

Personal details
- Born: 9 July 1963 (age 63) Helensville, New Zealand
- Party: Green
- Other political affiliations: City Vision (municipal)

Denise Maree Roche (born 9 July 1963) is a New Zealand politician. She was a member of the Waiheke Local Board and the New Zealand House of Representatives, where she represented the Green Party of Aotearoa New Zealand from 2011 to 2017.

== Early life ==
Roche was born in 1963 in Helensville, the eighth child of nine and the youngest daughter in her family. Roche is of Ngāti Huri and Scottish descent. Roche left high school early with no qualification, returning later in her life to complete her studies as an adult. She has an extensive background in union-related work and in 2000 completed a diploma in labour studies. In 2007 she completed a graduate diploma in not-for-profit management.

Roche and her partner John Stansfield moved to Waiheke in 1997, partners in Orapiu Grove Farm. From 2004 to 2010, she was on the board of trustees for Te Huruhi School.

She had previously worked for the Waste Resource Trust, promoting responsible waste disposal and recycling on Waiheke Island.

== Political career ==
New Zealand Parliament
Years	Term	Electorate	List	Party
2011–2014	50th	List	11	Green
2014–2017	51st	List	13	Green

She was the Auckland City Councillor for the Hauraki Gulf Islands from 2007 to 2010. She won in the 2007 Auckland local body election by a very narrow margin over long-standing incumbent, Faye Storer, by only eleven votes with a high-profile campaign.

In the 2010 Auckland local election for the Waiheke Local Board, she received the highest number of votes.

She was the candidate of the Green Party of Aotearoa New Zealand for Auckland Central in the 2008 general election. The Auckland Central electorate includes the whole of Waiheke Island. She received 13% of votes cast in the electorate and was not elected.

Placed in eleventh place on the Green Party list for the 2011 election, Roche was elected to Parliament, with the Greens gaining 14 positions based on the final results. As a member of parliament, Roche openly admitted to being a survivor of sexual abuse. Following John Key's statement that Labour was supporting "rapists" detained on Christmas Island, Roche, as a participant along with several other women MPs who were similarly victims, staged a walkout of Parliament in protest. Roche stated in parliament that she had "endured years of sexual assault as a child", stating she was personally offended that the Prime Minister implied that she would personally support rapists. Roche was number 13 on the Green party list for the 2017 general election, and was not re-elected as an MP.

Following the general election Roche ran as the City Vision candidate for the Waitematā Local Board vacancy created by the resignation of Mark Davey. She was successful, winning the seat by 249 votes.
