= Kate Wilkinson (politician) =

New Zealand politician

The Honourable Kate Wilkinson
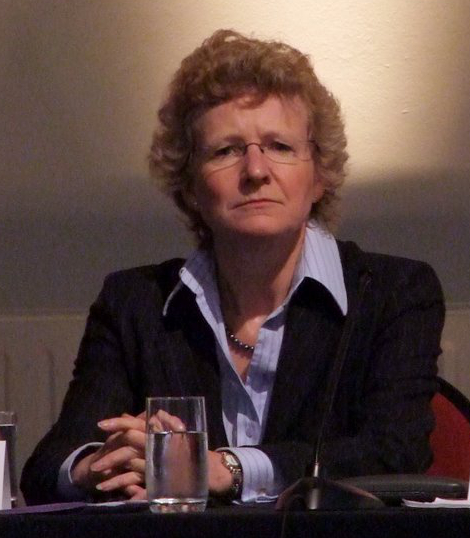

38th Minister of Labour
- In office 19 November 2008 – 5 November 2012
- Prime Minister: John Key
- Preceded by: Trevor Mallard
- Succeeded by: Chris Finlayson (acting)

Minister for Food Safety
- In office 19 November 2008 – 22 January 2013
- Prime Minister: John Key
- Preceded by: Lianne Dalziel
- Succeeded by: Nikki Kaye

Minister of Conservation
- In office 27 January 2010 – 22 January 2013
- Prime Minister: John Key
- Preceded by: Tim Groser
- Succeeded by: Nick Smith

Member of the New Zealand Parliament for National Party List
- In office 6 October 2005 – 26 November 2011

Member of the New Zealand Parliament for Waimakariri
- In office 26 November 2011 – 14 August 2014
- Preceded by: Clayton Cosgrove
- Succeeded by: Matt Doocey
- Majority: 642

Personal details
- Born: 3 August 1957 (age 69) Rakaia, New Zealand
- Party: National Party
- Education: University of Canterbury
- Occupation: Lawyer, politician

Catherine Joan Wilkinson (born 3 August 1957) is a New Zealand farmer and politician. She was a member of the New Zealand House of Representatives for the National Party from 2005 until her retirement in 2014. From 2008 until January 2013, she was a member of cabinet, holding the portfolios of Labour (from which she resigned over the Pike River Mine disaster), Conservation, Food Safety, and Associate Immigration, before being removed from cabinet by Prime Minister John Key.

== Life and career before politics ==
Wilkinson was raised on a mixed cropping farm at Chertsey in Mid Canterbury. She was educated at St Margaret's College in Christchurch, and went on to graduate with a Bachelor of Laws degree from the University of Canterbury. She worked as a lawyer for 25 years with Christchurch firm Harman & Co, becoming a partner in 1984, before gaining election to Parliament in 2005.

== Political career ==
New Zealand Parliament
Years	Term	Electorate	List	Party
2005–2008	48th	List	38	National
2008–2011	49th	List	30	National
2011–2014	50th	Waimakariri	17	National

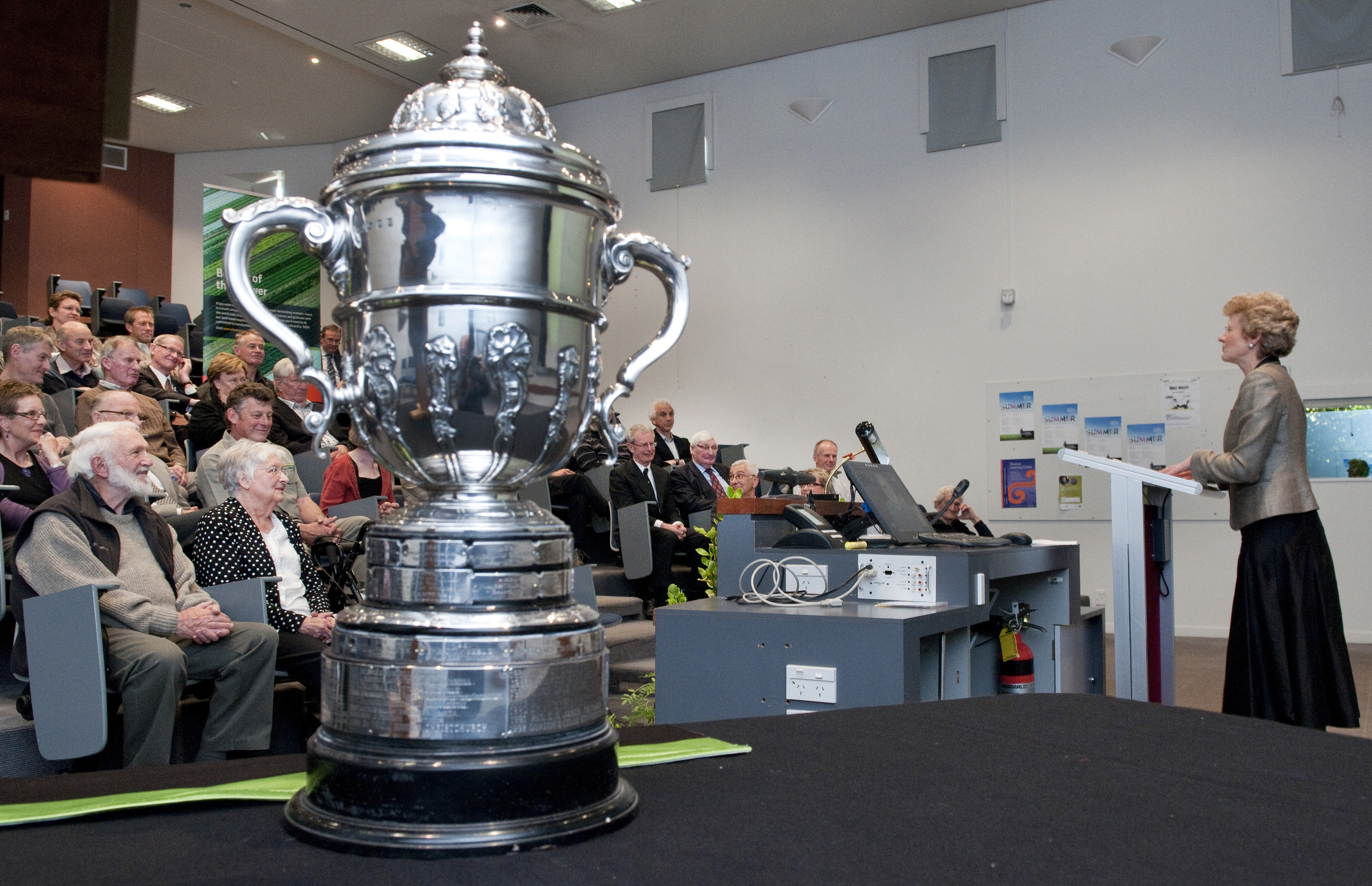
Wilkinson, as the Minister of Conservation, presenting the 2010 Loder Cup

In the 2005 election, Wilkinson was a candidate for the National Party, standing in the Waimakariri electorate and ranked 38th on the party list. She entered Parliament as a list MP. She has made a successful start to her career in politics, rising to 28th on the list, and eventually becoming a Cabinet minister. Although unsuccessful in terms of electorate vote again (losing to incumbent Clayton Cosgrove of the Labour Party by 390 votes in the 2008 election – the second narrowest margin in the country), National won a commanding margin in the party vote.

In the 2011 election Wilkinson overturned incumbent Clayton Cosgrove's 390 vote majority to win by 642 votes, as well as winning the party vote in the electorate by more than 12,000 votes.

In the 49th and 50th New Zealand Parliaments, Wilkinson served as Associate Minister of Conservation (2009–2010), Minister of Conservation (2010–2013), Minister for Food Safety (until 2013), Associate Minister of Immigration (until 2013), and Minister of Labour (2011–2012).

=== Folic acid criticism ===
Wilkinson was criticised for her decision not to mandate the addition of folic acid to bread sold to the public. Paediatric Society Doctor Andrew Marshall said "making folic acid mandatory would prevent 10 to 20 birth defects, such as spina bifida, a year", as well as strokes and other disease.

=== Resignation as Minister of Labour ===
Wilkinson resigned her portfolio as Minister of Labour on 5 November 2012, following the publication of the Royal Commission of Inquiry's report into the 2010 Pike River Mine disaster. It stated that there were major flaws in the Department of Labour, and recommended "sweeping changes" into the department. In a statement, Prime Minister John Key said, "Ms Wilkinson's decision to resign is a personal decision in response to the magnitude of the tragedy. It is the honourable thing to do. I considered it proper for me to accept her resignation from the Labour portfolio." She retained her other portfolios and was succeeded in the Labour portfolio by Chris Finlayson.

Wilkinson however was not asked to step down from her other portfolios in Conservation, Food Safety, and Associate Immigration. She was removed from cabinet in the reshuffle of January 2013.

On 31 January 2013 Wilkinson was granted the right to retain the title of The Honourable for life in recognition of her term as a Member of the Executive Council of New Zealand.

=== Retirement from politics ===
Wilkinson announced in November 2013 that she would retire at the end of the term of the 50th Parliament. Matt Doocey, who contested the 2013 Christchurch East by-election, was selected by the National Party to replace Wilkinson, and retained the seat with an increased majority at the 2014 election.

== Post-political career ==
After retiring from politics, Wilkinson lived on her family farm at Swannanoa in Canterbury. She was appointed Commissioner of the Environment Court in May 2015.

New Zealand Parliament
Preceded by Clayton Cosgrove	Member of Parliament for Waimakariri; 2011–2014	Succeeded by Matt Doocey
Political offices
Preceded by Trevor Mallard	Minister of Labour; 2008–2012	Succeeded by Chris Finlayson (acting)
Preceded by Tim Groser	Minister of Conservation; 2010–2013	Succeeded by Nick Smith
Preceded by Lianne Dalziel	Minister for Food Safety; 2008–2013	Succeeded by Nikki Kaye
