= Brendan Horan =

New Zealand politician

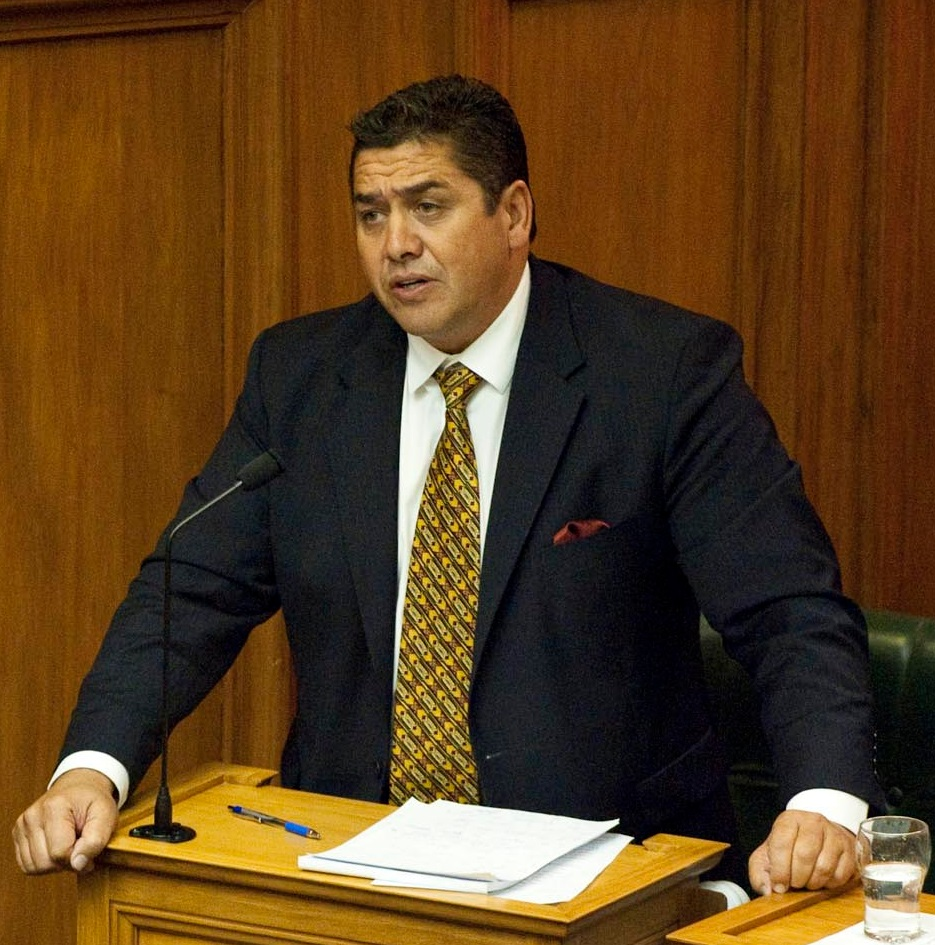
- Brendan Horan in 2013

Member of the New Zealand Parliament for New Zealand First party list
- In office 26 November 2011 – 4 December 2012

Member of Parliament for NZ Independent Coalition party list
- In office 4 December 2012 – 20 September 2014

Personal details
- Born: 9 July 1961 (age 65)
- Party: NZ Independent Coalition (previously New Zealand First)

Brendan Francis John Horan (born 9 July 1961) is a New Zealand former politician and former list MP, who was elected to the New Zealand Parliament in 2011 for the New Zealand First party. He was expelled from the New Zealand First caucus on 4 December 2012 and served the remainder of his term as an independent. Horan is of Māori descent with affiliations to Ngāti Maniapoto.

== Media and sporting career ==
Horan was a weather presenter for Television New Zealand's One News, running on a regular cycle with Karen Olsen and Natalie Crook. He started in March 2005, and took redundancy in 2007 when former TV1 weather presenter Jim Hickey returned after nearly 4 years absence on the air. His final weather presentation was on 7 September 2007.

Horan has been a professional lifeguard and coach, and was a New Zealand Surf Lifesaving Iron Man champion. He also represented New Zealand and Australia in waterpolo, and was a New Zealand outrigger canoe champion.

== Political career ==
New Zealand Parliament
Years	Term	Electorate	List	Party
2011–2012	50th	List	6	NZ First
2012–2014	Changed allegiance to:			Independent

In the 2008 general election, Horan contested the East Coast electorate for the New Zealand First party. He came third in electorate votes but due to New Zealand First's poor showing in party votes, was not elected from the party list.

At the 2011 general election Horan stood in Tauranga, narrowly coming third (by 96 votes) behind the Labour candidate. However, he was elected as a list MP for New Zealand First, after being ranked sixth on their party list.

In October 2012 he helped save the life of Indonesian MP Atte Sugandi by giving him CPR when the MP collapsed at a UN conference in Japan.

=== Expulsion from NZ First ===
In November 2012 Horan was accused of taking money from his dying mother's bank account and spending it on gambling. At first Winston Peters refused to say whether he still had confidence in Horan, but on 4 December expelled him from the party. Horan wasn't informed until Peters made the announcement in Parliament.

Horan flatly denied the allegations, and vowed to continue as an independent MP, despite only making it into Parliament as a list MP, without an electorate.

On 10 December 2012, Horan admitted making 144 calls to gambling agency TAB on his taxpayer-funded phone, but denied he had a gambling problem: "There were 144 calls in 10 months. Most of those days, I was lying with mum, on her bed, watching Trackside." Later that day he notified the Speaker he was no longer a member of NZ First, making his independence from the party official. He also called for an investigation into who leaked his phone records to the media.

=== New Zealand Independent Coalition ===
In 2013, Horan announced his intention to form a new political party. In January 2014 he launched the NZ Independent Coalition, which, following the general election on 20 September 2014 did not win any seats or cross the 5% party vote threshold to stay in Parliament. Horan stood in the Bay of Plenty electorate, coming fifth.

In 2016, the NZ Independent Coalition was deregistered. Also in 2016, Horan was cleared of the allegations around use of his mother's bank account, with police saying there was no evidence to support charges. Horan stated that the allegations had made it difficult to secure sought-after jobs.

=== 2025 local elections ===
During the 2025 New Zealand local elections, Horan unsuccessfully ran for a seat in the Whakatāne District Council's Whakatāne-Ōhope ward, coming fifth place.

== Personal life ==
Horan is married and has two children.

== See also ==
- List of New Zealand television personalities
