= Waimakariri (electorate) =

- Single-member general constituency for the New Zealand House of Representatives
- Interactive map of boundaries from the 2026 election
- Formation: 1996
- Region: Canterbury
- Character: Rural
- Term: 3 years

Member for Waimakariri
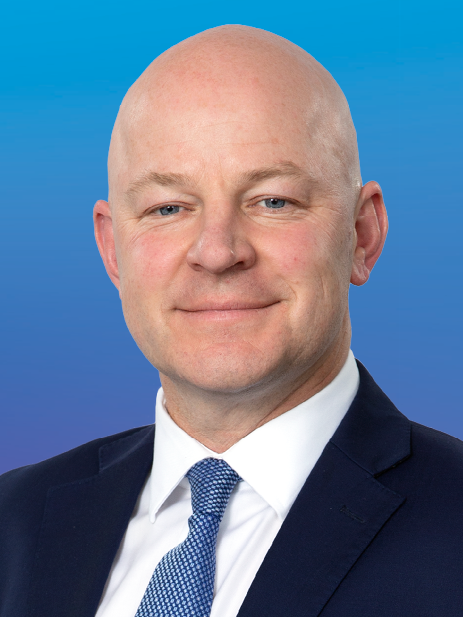
- Matt Doocey since 20 September 2014
- Party: National
- Previous MP: Kate Wilkinson

Waimakariri is a New Zealand parliamentary electorate, formed for the 1996 election and returning one Member of Parliament to the New Zealand House of Representatives. The MP for Waimakariri is Matt Doocey of the National Party. He has held this position since the 2014 election and takes over from Kate Wilkinson, who defeated Clayton Cosgrove (Labour) in the 2011 election.

== Population areas ==
Waimakariri centres on metropolitan Christchurch and spreads northward up the coast of the South Island. From Christchurch it contains the suburbs of Casebrook and Belfast; from Waimakariri District to its north, it takes in the towns of Kaiapoi and Rangiora as well as a selection of small inland localities such as Cust and Oxford. Boundary changes following the 2006 census were relatively minor; Waimakariri managed to avoid the upheaval wrought upon electorates in Christchurch, losing Bishopdale to Ilam and the last remaining segment of Papanui to Christchurch Central.

Along with neighbouring Selwyn, Waimakariri has been experiencing strong population growth, with many people from Christchurch displaced by the earthquakes. In the 2013/14 boundary review by the Representation Commission, Waimakariri lost most of Redwood and Marshland to Christchurch Central and Christchurch East respectively, while it gained the less populated Harewood north of Sawyers Arms Road from Selwyn.

== History ==
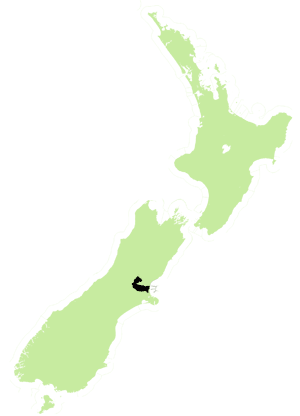
The Waimakariri electorate from 2008

Map of boundaries at the 2020 and 2023 general elections

The existence of Waimakariri dates back to the introduction of MMP voting in the 1996 general election, when the number of South Island electorates fell from twenty-five to sixteen. The electorate originates in the old Rangiora electorate, with Hurunui District shorn off and placed in Kaikōura, and the resultant electorate pulled into Christchurch via State Highway 71, absorbing parts of Christchurch previously in the electorate of Christchurch North. The first contest saw Rangiora's Jim Gerard easily defeated by former Prime Minister and MP for Christchurch North, Mike Moore. He left the office in July 1999, having been elected Director-General of the World Trade Organization.

Clayton Cosgrove won the second contest in 1999 and was confirmed in 2002, 2005 and 2008.

Given that Rangiora was a safe National electorate and Christchurch North a safe Labour electorate, and given the urban-rural makeup of the electorate, Waimakariri does not favour any party. At the 2005 election, while Waimakariri's electors were returning incumbent Clayton Cosgrove by 5,064 votes (and in the process slashing his majority in half), their party vote intentions were more ambiguous, with National winning 79 more party votes than Labour, setting Waimakariri up to be a key electorate at the 2008 election. Cosgrove retained the electorate with a much narrower 390 majority in 2008, whilst his opponent Kate Wilkinson's party (National) got over 5000 more party votes.

Results from the 2011 election gave Wilkinson a lead of 642 votes over Cosgrove, shifting the electorate from marginal Labour to marginal National. Wilkinson retired at the end of the parliamentary term and was replaced as National's candidate for the 2014 election by Matt Doocey, who had previously contested the 2013 by-election in Christchurch East. Doocey beat Cosgrove with an increased majority.

In the 2017 election, Doocey beat the Labour candidate, Dan Rosewarne, with an increased majority of that over Cosgrove although the National party vote decreased.

=== Members of Parliament ===
Key Labour National Alliance NZ First

Election	Winner
1996 election	Mike Moore
1999 election	Clayton Cosgrove
2002 election	Clayton Cosgrove
2005 election	Clayton Cosgrove
2008 election	Clayton Cosgrove
2011 election	Kate Wilkinson
2014 election	Matt Doocey
2017 election	Matt Doocey
2020 election	Matt Doocey
2023 election	Matt Doocey
2026 election	Matt Doocey

=== List MPs ===
Members of Parliament elected from party lists in elections where that person also unsuccessfully contested the Waimakariri electorate. Unless otherwise stated, all MPs terms began and ended at general elections.

Election	Winner
1996 election	Jim Gerard^{1}
1996 election	John Wright
1999 election	Ron Mark
1999 election	John Wright
2002 election	Ron Mark
2005 election	Ron Mark
2005 election	Kate Wilkinson
2008 election	Kate Wilkinson
2011 election	Clayton Cosgrove
2011 election	Richard Prosser
2014 election	Clayton Cosgrove
2014 election	Richard Prosser
2022	Dan Rosewarne^{2}
2026	Dan Rosewarne^{3}

^{1}Jim Gerard retired in April 1997 to take appointment as High Commissioner to Canada
^{2}Rosewarne entered Parliament on 25 July 2022, following the resignation of Kris Faafoi.
^{3}Rosewarne entered Parliament on 16 March 2026, following the resignation of Peeni Henare.

== Election results ==
=== 2026 election ===
The next election was held on 7 November 2026. Candidates for Waimakariri are listed at Candidates in the 2026 New Zealand general election by electorate § Waimakariri. Official results will be available after 27 November 2026. Preliminary results have Matt Doocey returning to parliament.

=== 2023 election ===
2023 general election: Waimakariri
Notes:	Blue background denotes the winner of the electorate vote. Pink background denotes a candidate elected from their party list. Yellow background denotes an electorate win by a list member, or other incumbent. A ✓ or ✗ denotes status of any incumbent, win or lose respectively.						
Party	Candidate	Votes	%	±%	Party votes	%	±%
National	✓ Matt Doocey	26,816	57.66	+11.70	19,969	42.61	+14.32
Labour	Dan Rosewarne	13,806	29.69	−13.04	11,317	24.15	−25.16
ACT	Ross Eric Campbell	2,066	4.44	+1.53	4,941	10.54	+1.31
Leighton Baker Party	Leighton Baker	1,815	3.90	−0.51	302	0.64	—
DemocracyNZ	Gordon Malcolm	1,530	3.29	—	461	0.98	—
Green					3,996	8.53	+3.90
NZ First					3,285	7.01	+4.90
Opportunities					1,034	2.21	+1.28
NZ Loyal					440	0.94	—
Te Pāti Māori					238	0.51	+0.35
NewZeal					199	0.42	+0.32 (Note: Compared to ONE Party)
Legalise Cannabis					179	0.38	+0.01
New Conservative					108	0.23	−2.76
Animal Justice					102	0.22	—
Freedoms NZ					82	0.17	—
Women's Rights					48	0.10	—
New Nation					20	0.04	—
Informal votes		474			142		
Total valid votes		46,507			46,863		
National hold	Majority	13,010	27.97	−24.74			

=== 2020 election ===
2020 general election: Waimakariri
Notes:	Blue background denotes the winner of the electorate vote. Pink background denotes a candidate elected from their party list. Yellow background denotes an electorate win by a list member, or other incumbent. A ✓ or ✗ denotes status of any incumbent, win or lose respectively.						
Party	Candidate	Votes	%	±%	Party votes	%	±%
National	✓ Matt Doocey	21,416	45.96	−11.64	13,245	28.29	−25.26
Labour	Dan Rosewarne	19,909	42.73	+12.5	23,088	49.31	+19.08
New Conservative	Leighton Baker	2,057	4.41	+3.74	1,399	2.99	+2.57
ACT	James Davies	1,355	2.91	+2.68	4,324	9.23	+8.94
Sustainable NZ	John Hyndman	405	0.87	—	55	0.21	—
Advance NZ	Shelley Richardson	363	0.78	—	353	0.76	—
Independent	Bjorn Sadler	197	0.42	—			
Social Credit	Lawrence McIsaac	128	0.27	+0.13	40	0.08	−0.09
Green					2168	4.63	+0.51
NZ First					989	2.11	−4.53
Opportunities					435	0.93	−0.86
Legalise Cannabis					174	0.37	−0.13
Māori Party					74	0.16	−0.08
ONE					49	0.10	—
Outdoors					37	0.08	—
Vision NZ					20	0.04	—
TEA					14	0.03	—
Heartland					3	0.01	—
Informal votes		763			356		
Total valid votes		46,593			46,823		
Turnout		46,823					
National hold	Majority	1,507	3.23	−21.78			

=== 2017 election ===
2017 general election: Waimakariri
Notes:	Blue background denotes the winner of the electorate vote. Pink background denotes a candidate elected from their party list. Yellow background denotes an electorate win by a list member, or other incumbent. A ✓ or ✗ denotes status of any incumbent, win or lose respectively.						
Party	Candidate	Votes	%	±%	Party votes	%	±%
National	✓ Matt Doocey	22,657	57.60	+9.26	21,398	53.55	−3.78
Labour	Dan Rosewarne	11,891	30.23	−11.09	12,888	32.25	+13.25
Green	Nikki Berry	1,799	4.57	+0.35	1,645	4.12	−4.72
NZ First	Richard Prosser	1,771	4.50	+1.63	2,653	6.64	−1.80
Opportunities	Nicola Glenjarman	583	1.48	—	714	1.79	—
Conservative	Benjamin Price	265	0.67	−1.61	166	0.42	−3.89
Māori Party	Aroha Reriti-Crofts	122	0.31	+0.05	85	0.21	−0.05
Independent	Destiny Wiringi	99	0.25	—			
ACT	Stuart Hawkins	92	0.23	—	116	0.29	+0.07
Democrats	Peter Adcock-White	55	0.14	−0.03	69	0.17	−0.02
Legalise Cannabis					97	0.24	−0.11
Ban 1080					35	0.09	−0.10
United Future					35	0.09	−0.10
Outdoors					33	0.08	—
People's Party					13	0.03	—
Internet					6	0.02	−0.37 (Note: 2017 Internet Party swing is relative to the votes for Internet-Mana in 2014; it shared a party list with Mana Party in the 2014 election)
Mana Party					5	0.01	−0.38 (Note: 2017 Mana Party swing is relative to the votes for Internet-Mana in 2014; it shared a party list with the Internet Party in the 2014 election)
Informal votes		261			103		
Total valid votes		39,334			39,958		
Turnout		40,012					
National hold	Majority	10,766	25.01	+17.99			

=== 2014 election ===
2014 general election: Waimakariri
Notes:	Blue background denotes the winner of the electorate vote. Pink background denotes a candidate elected from their party list. Yellow background denotes an electorate win by a list member, or other incumbent. A ✓ or ✗ denotes status of any incumbent, win or lose respectively.						
Party	Candidate	Votes	%	±%	Party votes	%	±%
National	Matt Doocey	17,263	48.34	+1.06	20,734	57.33	+0.44
Labour	Clayton Cosgrove	14,757	41.32	−4.16	6,835	18.90	−3.51
Green	Reuben Hunt	1,506	4.22	+0.85	3,198	8.84	+0.37
NZ First	Richard Prosser	1,024	2.87	+1.21	3,054	8.44	+3.52
Conservative	Benjamin Price	816	2.28	+0.07	1,560	4.31	+1.04
Māori Party	Aroha Reriti-Crofts	92	0.26	+0.09	95	0.26	0.00
Democrats	Peter Adcock-White	62	0.17	+0.17	69	0.19	+0.13
Internet Mana					141	0.39	+0.29
Legalise Cannabis					127	0.35	−0.08
ACT					80	0.22	−0.34
Ban 1080					69	0.19	+0.19
United Future					66	0.18	+0.18
Civilian					15	0.04	+0.04
Independent Coalition					6	0.02	+0.02
Focus					5	0.01	+0.01
Informal votes		192			114		
Total valid votes		35,712			36,168		
National hold	Majority	2,506	7.02	+5.21			

=== 2011 election ===
2011 general election: Waimakariri
Notes:	Blue background denotes the winner of the electorate vote. Pink background denotes a candidate elected from their party list. Yellow background denotes an electorate win by a list member, or other incumbent. A ✓ or ✗ denotes status of any incumbent, win or lose respectively.						
Party	Candidate	Votes	%	±%	Party votes	%	±%
National	Kate Wilkinson	16,787	47.28	+4.25	20,489	56.89	+7.45
Labour	✗ Clayton Cosgrove	16,145	45.48	+1.39	8,431	23.41	−10.46
Green	John Kelcher	1,197	3.37	−0.01	3,050	8.47	+3.04
Conservative	Tim de Vries	785	2.21	+2.21	1,177	3.27	+3.27
NZ First	Richard Prosser	588	1.66	−1.46	2,131	5.92	+1.96
United Future					208	0.58	−0.33
ACT					195	0.54	−2.00
Legalise Cannabis					155	0.43	+0.10
Māori Party					93	0.26	−0.12
Mana					35	0.10	−0.12
Democrats					23	0.06	−0.02
Alliance					17	0.05	−0.06
Libertarianz					12	0.03	+0.01
Informal votes		490			297		
Total valid votes		35,502			36,016		
National gain from Labour	Majority	642	1.81	+2.86			

Electorate (as at 26 November 2011): 47,387

=== 2008 election ===
2008 general election: Waimakariri
Notes:	Blue background denotes the winner of the electorate vote. Pink background denotes a candidate elected from their party list. Yellow background denotes an electorate win by a list member, or other incumbent. A ✓ or ✗ denotes status of any incumbent, win or lose respectively.						
Party	Candidate	Votes	%	±%	Party votes	%	±%
Labour	✓ Clayton Cosgrove	16,360	44.09		12,702	33.87	
National	Kate Wilkinson	15,970	43.04		18,539	49.44	
ACT	Aaron Keown	1,717	4.63		953	2.54	
Green	Alan Liefting	1,253	3.38		2,036	5.43	
NZ First	Melanie Mark-Shadbolt	1,157	3.12		1,482	3.95	
Kiwi	Leighton Baker	536	1.44		397	1.06	
United Future	Kelleigh Sheffield-Cranstoun	114	0.31		342	0.91	
Progressive					397	1.06	
Bill and Ben					228	0.61	
Māori Party					140	0.37	
Legalise Cannabis					123	0.33	
Family Party					61	0.16	
Alliance					40	0.11	
Democrats					33	0.09	
Workers Party					9	0.02	
Libertarianz					7	0.02	
Pacific					5	0.01	
RONZ					4	0.01	
RAM					3	0.01	
Informal votes		202			114		
Total valid votes		37,107			37,501		
Labour hold	Majority	390	1.05				

=== 2005 election ===
2005 general election: Waimakariri
Notes:	Blue background denotes the winner of the electorate vote. Pink background denotes a candidate elected from their party list. Yellow background denotes an electorate win by a list member, or other incumbent. A ✓ or ✗ denotes status of any incumbent, win or lose respectively.						
Party	Candidate	Votes	%	±%	Party votes	%	±%
Labour	✓ Clayton Cosgrove	19,084	48.61	−3.72	16,484	41.48	
National	Kate Wilkinson	13,478	34.33	+13.38	16,565	41.68	
NZ First	Ron Mark	4,247	10.82	−5.90	2,453	6.17	
Green	Alan Liefting	833	2.12		1,527	3.84	
United Future	John Pickering	651	1.66		1,295	3.26	
Progressive	John Wright	458	1.66		609	1.53	
Legalise Cannabis	Michael Britnell	289	0.74		125	0.31	
ACT	Rebekah Holdaway	196	0.50		362	0.91	
Direct Democracy	Jason Orme	23	0.06		5	0.01	
Destiny					115	0.29	
Māori Party					62	0.16	
Christian Heritage					49	0.12	
Democrats					32	0.08	
Alliance					21	0.05	
Libertarianz					12	0.03	
Family Rights					8	0.02	
One NZ					8	0.02	
99 MP					7	0.02	
RONZ					5	0.01	
Informal votes		277			116		
Total valid votes		39,258			39,744		
Labour hold	Majority	5,606	14.28	−17.10			

=== 2002 election ===
2002 general election: Waimakariri
Notes:	Blue background denotes the winner of the electorate vote. Pink background denotes a candidate elected from their party list. Yellow background denotes an electorate win by a list member, or other incumbent. A ✓ or ✗ denotes status of any incumbent, win or lose respectively.						
Party	Candidate	Votes	%	±%	Party votes	%	±%
Labour	✓ Clayton Cosgrove	17,571	51.93		14,383	42.29	
National	Dan Gordon	7,035	20.97		7,593	22.32	
NZ First	Ron Mark	5,615	16.59		3,834	11.27	
Green	Charles Drace	952	2.81		1,628	4.79	
United Future	Andrew Smith	802	2.37		2,379	6.99	
Progressive	John Wright	583	1.72		721	2.12	
ACT	Nicholas Cairney	475	1.40		1,771	5.21	
Christian Heritage	Stephen Williams	391	1.16		481	1.41	
Alliance	Paul Piesse	156	0.46		329	0.97	
ORNZ					571	1.68	
Legalise Cannabis					167	0.49	
One NZ					18	0.05	
Mana Māori					8	0.02	
NMP					2	0.01	
Informal votes		253			129		
Total valid votes		33,833			34,014		
Labour hold	Majority	10,536	31.14				

=== 1999 election ===
Refer to Candidates in the New Zealand general election 1999 by electorate#Waimakariri for a list of candidates.
