= Clayton Cosgrove =

New Zealand politician

The Honourable Clayton Cosgrove
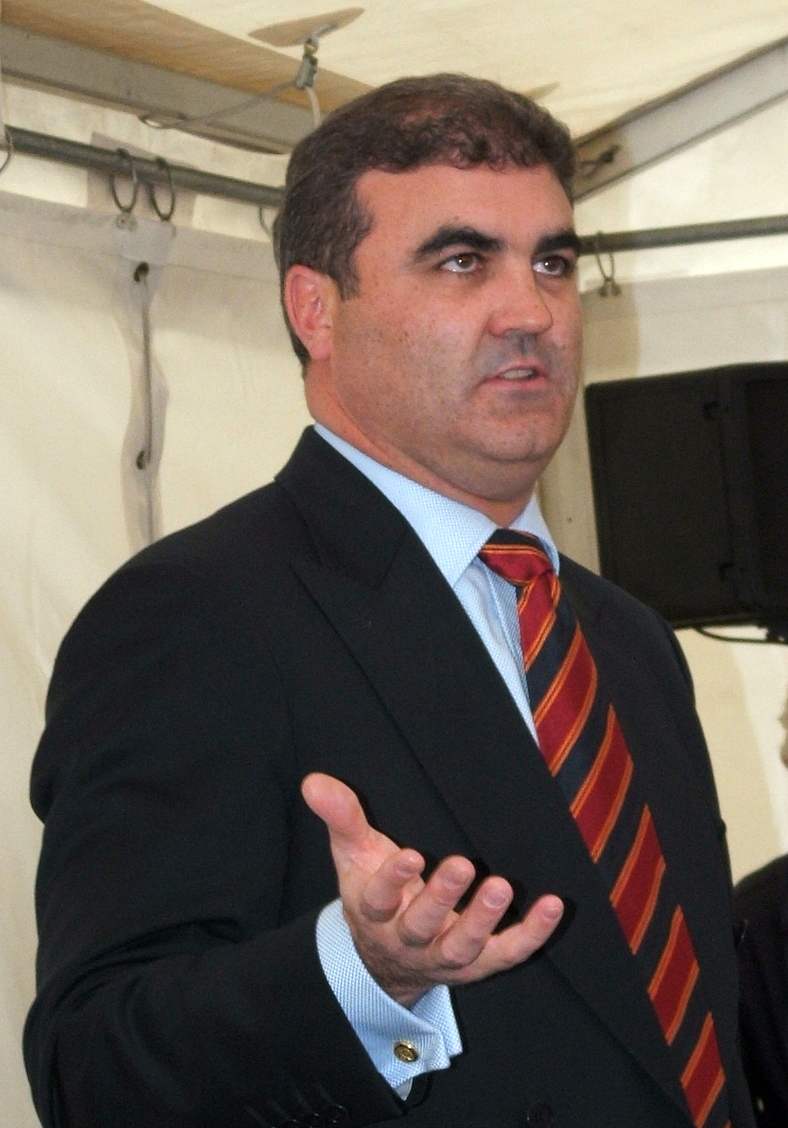

52nd Minister of Immigration
- In office 11 November 2007 – 19 November 2008
- Prime Minister: Helen Clark
- Preceded by: David Cunliffe
- Succeeded by: Jonathan Coleman

3rd Minister for Building Issues
- In office 19 November 2005 – 5 November 2007
- Prime Minister: Helen Clark
- Preceded by: Chris Carter
- Succeeded by: Shane Jones

24th Minister of Statistics
- In office 19 November 2005 – 5 November 2007
- Prime Minister: Helen Clark
- Preceded by: Pete Hodgson
- Succeeded by: Darren Hughes

Member of the New Zealand Parliament for Waimakariri
- In office 27 November 1999 – 27 November 2011
- Preceded by: Mike Moore
- Succeeded by: Kate Wilkinson

Member of the New Zealand Parliament for Labour Party list
- In office 27 November 2011 – 23 September 2017

Personal details
- Born: 31 October 1969 (age 57) Nelson, New Zealand
- Party: Labour
- Education: University of Canterbury

Clayton James Cosgrove (born 31 October 1969) is a former New Zealand politician. He is a member of the Labour Party.

== Early life ==
Cosgrove was born in Nelson, New Zealand. He received a BA (Triple Major), in History, American Studies and Political Science, from the University of Canterbury in 1992 and received an MBA in 1996. Before entering politics, he worked in the Corporate Affair field within the Minerals and Telecommunications industries. He was also a small business owner.

== Labour Party involvement ==
Cosgove has been a member of the Labour Party since he was fourteen, and has held a number of posts within the party. He was chairman of the party's Canterbury branch from 1989 to 1994.

He was a strong supporter of Mike Moore, and opposed Moore's replacement by Helen Clark. Before the 1996 election he was involved in discussions with Moore to form a new party but this failed to eventuate.

== Member of Parliament ==
New Zealand Parliament
Years	Term	Electorate	List	Party
1999–2002	46th	Waimakariri	none	Labour
2002–2005	47th	Waimakariri	none	Labour
2005–2008	48th	Waimakariri	none	Labour
2008–2011	49th	Waimakariri	18	Labour
2011–2014	50th	List	8	Labour
2014–2017	51st	List	8	Labour

Cosgrove himself stood for election in Moore's former Waimakariri seat in the 1999 election, and was successful. During 2002 he was selected and graduated the World Economic Forum's Global Leaders of Tomorrow programme (later called Young Global Leaders). He was re-elected in the 2002, 2005 and 2008 general elections. However, he was defeated in the electorate by National's Kate Wilkinson in 2011 and was subsequently elected as list MP. Wilkinson retired at the end of the parliamentary term and was replaced as National's candidate for the 2014 election by Matt Doocey, who had previously contested the 2013 by-election in Christchurch East. Doocey beat Cosgrove with an increased majority. Being again in eighth place on the Labour list, Cosgrove remained a list MP.

=== Cabinet minister (2005–2008) ===
He was appointed Minister for Building and Construction, Minister of Statistics, Associate Minister of Finance, Associate Minister of Justice and Associate Minister of Immigration (responsible for individual immigration cases) after the 2005 election. At the October 2007 Cabinet reshuffle, he was promoted and replaced his Building and Construction and Statistics portfolio responsibilities; with the Immigration, Small Business, Sport and Recreation portfolios, and ministerial responsibility for the Rugby World Cup. He retained his roles as Associate Minister of Justice and Finance. Cosgrove lost his ministerial position when Labour was defeated in the 2008 election.

Cosgrove was selected to attend the World Economic Forum's Annual meeting in New York and Davos in 2001 and 2002, and was appointed to the Forum's task force on Free Trade. He is generally considered to be on the right of the Labour Party.

==== Boy racers ====
In August 2007 Cosgrove was targeted after raising considerable concerns about boy racers, who have caused numerous and significant problems throughout his electorate and Christchurch in general. Boy racers attempted to intimidate Cosgrove in a number of ways, including defacing billboards and driving past his house on Saturday nights. New Zealand has considerable problems with boy racers, leading to many car seizures and a new law being mooted to crush the vehicles of the worst offenders.

=== Opposition (2008–2017) ===
When Lianne Dalziel confirmed that she would contest the 2013 Christchurch mayoralty, her Christchurch Earthquake Recovery portfolio was split and assigned to Cosgrove and Ruth Dyson in July 2013. He considered standing in the by-election resulting from Dalziel's resignation from Parliament, but in the end decided not to put his name forward for the Labour nomination.

He announced he would be retiring from politics at the 2017 general election in April 2016.

== Post politics ==
After leaving parliament, Cosgrove worked as consultant and lobbyist, including for the ill-fated attempt to mine Foulden Maar for pig food and the Greymouth Hospital construction.

New Zealand Parliament
Preceded by Mike Moore	Member of Parliament for Waimakariri; 1999–2011	Succeeded by Kate Wilkinson
Political offices
Preceded by Pete Hodgson	Minister of Statistics; 2005–2007	Succeeded by Darren Hughes
Preceded by Chris Carter	Minister for Building Issues; 2005–2007	Succeeded by Shane Jones
Preceded by David Cunliffe	Minister of Immigration; 2007–2008	Succeeded by Jonathan Coleman
New title	Minister for the Rugby World Cup; 2007–2008	Succeeded by Murray McCully
