= NZ Independent Coalition =

- Leader: Brendan Horan
- Chairperson: Michael O'Neil
- Founded: January 2014
- Dissolved: 20 May 2016

Website
- www.nzindependent.org.nz

The NZ Independent Coalition was a political party in New Zealand. The party was founded in January 2014 by Brendan Horan. Horan was expelled from New Zealand First in December 2012 following accusations of taking money from his dying mother's bank account and spending it on gambling. Horan acted an independent Member of Parliament after expulsion, and proposed starting a party in January 2013. In February 2014, the party registered a logo with the Electoral Commission. On 18 June 2014, it applied for registration. The party was registered on 24 July.

The party launched its campaign on 29 July 2014 with a slogan of "safe children, safe whanau, safe society", and promising higher pensions and the removal of tertiary education fees. On 19 August, it announced its party list. The party emphasised electorate representation, and MPs were required to poll their electorates on major issues and vote accordingly.

In the New Zealand General Election, held in September 2014, the party did not win any electorate seats, or enough percentage of the party vote to stay in Parliament. It attracted 872 voters, or 0.04% of total New Zealand voter share. The party was deregistered by the Electoral Commission on 20 May 2016.

== Electoral results ==
Election	Candidates nominated		Seats won	Votes	Vote share %	Position	NZ Independent Coalition in government?
Election	Electorate	List	Seats won	Votes	Vote share %	Position	NZ Independent Coalition in government?
2014	4	10	0 / 121	872	0.04%	14th / 15	Unelected
