= Candidates in the 2017 New Zealand general election by electorate =

New Zealand political candidates in the MMP era
Year	Party list	Candidates
1996	party lists	by electorate
1999	party lists	by electorate
2002	party lists	by electorate
2005	party lists	by electorate
2008	party lists	by electorate
2011	party lists	by electorate
2014	party lists	by electorate
2017	party lists	by electorate
2020	party lists	by electorate
2023	party lists	by electorate
2026	party lists	by electorate

Seventy-one members of the New Zealand House of Representatives were elected from electorates in the general election on 23 September 2017.

== General electorates ==
=== Auckland Central ===
2017 general election: Auckland Central
Notes:	Blue background denotes an incumbent. Pink background denotes a current list MP. Yellow background denotes a retiring MP.			
Party	Candidate	Notes	List #	Source
NZ First	Frank Edwards		48	
Conservative	Stephen Greenfield		none	
Opportunities	Mika Haka		10	
Climate First	Leslie Jones			
National	Nikki Kaye		13	
Green	Denise Roche	Contested electorate in 2014	13	
ACT	Brooke van Velden		3	
Labour	Helen White		40	

=== Bay of Plenty ===
2017 general election: Bay of Plenty
Notes:	Blue background denotes an incumbent. Pink background denotes a current list MP. Yellow background denotes a retiring MP.			
Party	Candidate	Notes	List #	Source
Māori Party	Raewyn Bennett			
ACT	Bruce Carley		18	
NZ First	Lester Gray		27	
National	Todd Muller		43	
Labour	Angie Warren-Clark		39	
Retiring incumbents and withdrawn candidates
Democrats	Tracy Livingston	Announced, but not on final candidate list; contested electorate in 2014	19	

=== Botany ===
2017 general election: Botany
Notes:	Blue background denotes an incumbent. Pink background denotes a current list MP. Yellow background denotes a retiring MP.			
Party	Candidate	Notes	List #	Source
Māori Party	Wetex Kang		13	
United Future	Damian Light	Contested Northcote in 2014	1	
Labour	Tofik Mamedov	Contested electorate in 2014	67	
National	Jami-Lee Ross		27	
ACT	Sam Singh		34	
Green	Julie Zhu		22	

=== Christchurch Central ===
2017 general election: Christchurch Central
Notes:	Blue background denotes an incumbent. Pink background denotes a current list MP. Yellow background denotes a retiring MP.			
Party	Candidate	Notes	List #	Source
United Future	Ian Gaskin		9	
Opportunities	Doug Hill		7	
Green	Peter Richardson		52	
NZ First	Phil Robinson		none	
Legalise Cannabis	Janine Shufflebotham		9	
National	Nicky Wagner		22	
Labour	Duncan Webb		43	
Retiring incumbents and withdrawn candidates
Green	Dora Langsbury	Withdrew candidacy due to work commitments		

=== Christchurch East ===
2017 general election: Christchurch East
Notes:	Blue background denotes an incumbent. Pink background denotes a current list MP. Yellow background denotes a retiring MP.			
Party	Candidate	Notes	List #	Source
Conservative	Chris Brosnan	Contested Port Hills in 2014	none	
National	Jo Hayes	Contested electorate in 2014	36	
Legalise Cannabis	Paula Lambert		3	
NZ First	Melanie Mark-Shadbolt		19	
ACT	Toni Severin	Contested Christchurch Central in 2014	10	
Green	Cathy Sweet		59	
Labour	Poto Williams		25	

=== Clutha-Southland ===
2017 general election: Clutha-Southland
Notes:	Blue background denotes an incumbent. Pink background denotes a current list MP. Yellow background denotes a retiring MP.			
Party	Candidate	Notes	List #	Source
Ban 1080	Brian Adams		4	
Conservative	Lachlan Ashton	Contested electorate in 2014	6	
Labour	Cherie Chapman		62	
Green	Rachael Goldsmith	Contested electorate in 2014	39	
NZ First	Mark Patterson		7	
Independent	Joe Stringer			
National	Hamish Walker	Contested Dunedin South in 2014	68	
Retiring incumbents and withdrawn candidates
National	Todd Barclay	Was re-selected, but later resigned		

=== Coromandel ===
2017 general election: Coromandel
Notes:	Blue background denotes an incumbent. Pink background denotes a current list MP. Yellow background denotes a retiring MP.			
Party	Candidate	Notes	List #	Source
NZ First	Anne-Marie Andrews		41	
Labour	Nathaniel Blomfield		69	
Ban 1080	Clyde Graf		1	
National	Scott Simpson		26	
Green	Scott Summerfield		34	
Retiring incumbents and withdrawn candidates
ACT	Vineet Shiriwastow	Announced, but not on candidate list	37	

=== Dunedin North ===
2017 general election: Dunedin North
Notes:	Blue background denotes an incumbent. Pink background denotes a current list MP. Yellow background denotes a retiring MP.			
Party	Candidate	Notes	List #	Source
Green	Niki Bould		32	
Labour	David Clark		9	
Independent	Adrian Graamans	Contested electorate in 2014		
Opportunities	Abe Gray	Contested electorate in 2014 for Legalise Cannabis	14	
Independent	Stan Lusby	Contested electorate in 2014		
ACT	Sam Purchas		9	
NZ First	Warren Voight	Contested Dunedin South in 2014 for Democrats	46	
National	Michael Woodhouse	Contested electorate in 2014 election	10	

=== Dunedin South ===
2017 general election: Dunedin South
Notes:	Blue background denotes an incumbent. Pink background denotes a current list MP. Yellow background denotes a retiring MP.			
Party	Candidate	Notes	List #	Source
Labour	Clare Curran		23	
ACT	Dan Doughty		22	
Green	Shane Gallagher	Contested electorate in 2014	33	
National	Matt Gregory		53	
Legalise Cannabis	Adrian McDermott		8	
NZ First	Kerry Rushton		51	
Opportunities	Lindsay Smith		26	

=== East Coast ===
2017 general election: East Coast
Notes:	Blue background denotes an incumbent. Pink background denotes a current list MP. Yellow background denotes a retiring MP.			
Party	Candidate	Notes	List #	Source
Labour	Kiri Allan		21	
Green	Gareth Hughes	Contested Ōhariu in 2008 and 2011	5	
Opportunities	Lesley Immink		17	
Independent	Tekawe Ratu			
NZ First	Julian Tilley		42	
National	Anne Tolley		11	
Māori Party	Rihi Vercoe			

=== East Coast Bays ===
2017 general election: East Coast Bays
Notes:	Blue background denotes an incumbent. Pink background denotes a current list MP. Yellow background denotes a retiring MP.			
Party	Candidate	Notes	List #	Source
ACT	Stephen Berry	Contested Upper Harbour in 2014	5	
Labour	Naisi Chen		50	
Green	Nicholas Mayne		49	
Opportunities	Teresa Moore	Initially announced as Green Party candidate	3	
NZ First	Ilja Ruppeldt		49	
National	Erica Stanford		65	
Retiring incumbents and withdrawn candidates
Labour	Rohan Lord	Withdrew due to low list placing	72	
National	Murray McCully			

=== Epsom ===
2017 general election: Epsom
Notes:	Blue background denotes an incumbent. Pink background denotes a current list MP. Yellow background denotes a retiring MP.			
Party	Candidate	Notes	List #	Source
Conservative	Leighton Baker	Contested Christchurch East in 2014	1	
Green	Barry Coates	Contested Mount Roskill in 2014	10	
National	Paul Goldsmith	Contested electorate in 2014	18	
Labour	David Parker	Contested electorate in 2011	10	
NZ First	Julian Paul		33	
ACT	David Seymour		1	

=== Hamilton East ===
2017 general election: Hamilton East
Notes:	Blue background denotes an incumbent. Pink background denotes a current list MP. Yellow background denotes a retiring MP.			
Party	Candidate	Notes	List #	Source
National	David Bennett		24	
RONZ	Jack Gielen	Contested electorate in 2008		
ACT	James McDowall		13	
NZ First	Pita Paraone	Contested Whangarei in 2014	11	
Labour	Jamie Strange	Contested Taupō in 2014	36	
Green	Sam Taylor		25	
Retiring incumbents and withdrawn candidates
Democrats	Mischele Rhodes	Announced, but not on final candidate list; contested electorate in 2014		

=== Hamilton West ===
2017 general election: Hamilton West
Notes:	Blue background denotes an incumbent. Pink background denotes a current list MP. Yellow background denotes a retiring MP.			
Party	Candidate	Notes	List #	Source
National	Tim Macindoe		25	
Opportunities	Donna Pokere-Phillips	Contested Port Waikato for Alliance in 1999	6	
Māori Party	Boris Samujh		none	
Labour	Gaurav Sharma		70	
Independent	Roger Stratford			
United Future	Quentin Todd		6	
Independent	Vin Tomar			
NZ First	Shayne Wihongi		34	
Green	Jo Wrigley		28	
Retiring incumbents and withdrawn candidates
Labour	Sue Moroney	Won nomination before choosing to retire.		

=== Helensville ===
2017 general election: Helensville
Notes:	Blue background denotes an incumbent. Pink background denotes a current list MP. Yellow background denotes a retiring MP.			
Party	Candidate	Notes	List #	Source
ACT	Alex Evans		23	
Green	Hayley Holt		14	
National	Chris Penk	Contested Kelston in 2014	64	
NZ First	Helen Peterson		20	
Labour	Kurt Taogaga		59	
Independent	Brendan Whyte	Contested electorate in 2014		
Retiring incumbents and withdrawn candidates
National	John Key	Retired before election.		

=== Hunua ===
2017 general election: Hunua
Notes:	Blue background denotes an incumbent. Pink background denotes a current list MP. Yellow background denotes a retiring MP.			
Party	Candidate	Notes	List #	Source
National	Andrew Bayly		39	
Independent	Ian Cummings	Contested electorate for ACT in 2014		
Labour	Baljit Kaur		64	
Green	Phil McCabe		none	
NZ First	Jon Reeves	Contested electorate in 2014	16	
ACT	Anthony Smith		35	

=== Hutt South ===
2017 general election: Hutt South
Notes:	Blue background denotes an incumbent. Pink background denotes a current list MP. Yellow background denotes a retiring MP.			
Party	Candidate	Notes	List #	Source
Labour	Ginny Andersen	Contested Ōhariu in 2014	28	
Outdoors	Wilf Bearman-Reidel		4	
National	Chris Bishop	Contested electorate in 2014	40	
Independent	Dorothy Fox			
NZ First	Alok Gupta		52	
Green	Virginia Horrocks			
ACT	Andy Parkins		17	
Opportunities	Richard Warwick		12	
Retiring incumbents and withdrawn candidates
Labour	Trevor Mallard	Contesting list only		
Green	Susanne Ruthven	Withdrew citing work commitments	25	

=== Ilam ===
2017 general election: Ilam
Notes:	Blue background denotes an incumbent. Pink background denotes a current list MP. Yellow background denotes a retiring MP.			
Party	Candidate	Notes	List #	Source
National	Gerry Brownlee		5	
Independent	Martin Francis			
Conservative	Martin Frauenstein		5	
ACT	Paul Gilbert	Contested Selwyn in 2014	24	
Green	David Lee		48	
Independent	Raf Manji			
Labour	Anthony Rimell		71	

=== Invercargill ===
2017 general election: Invercargill
Notes:	Blue background denotes an incumbent. Pink background denotes a current list MP. Yellow background denotes a retiring MP.			
Party	Candidate	Notes	List #	Source
NZ First	Ria Bond	Contested electorate in 2014	12	
Labour	Liz Craig	Contested Clutha-Southland in 2014	31	
National	Sarah Dowie		41	
Green	Rochelle Surendran		35	

=== Kaikōura ===
2017 general election: Kaikōura
Notes:	Blue background denotes an incumbent. Pink background denotes a current list MP. Yellow background denotes a retiring MP.			
Party	Candidate	Notes	List #	Source
NZ First	Jamie Arbuckle		23	
ACT	Richard Evans	Contested electorate in 2014	12	
United Future	John Foster		8	
Conservative	David Greenslade		none	
Democrats	John McCaskey	Contested electorate in 2014	23	
Green	Richard McCubbin		none	
National	Stuart Smith		47	
Labour	Janette Walker	Contested electorate in 2014	45	

=== Kelston ===
2017 general election: Kelston
Notes:	Blue background denotes an incumbent. Pink background denotes a current list MP. Yellow background denotes a retiring MP.			
Party	Candidate	Notes	List #	Source
National	Bala Beeram		57	
NZ First	Anne Degia-Pala	Contested electorate in 2014	28	
Conservative	Warren Knott		none	
Legalise Cannabis	Jeff Lye	Contested electorate in 2014	2	
Green	Nicola Smith		57	
Labour	Carmel Sepuloni		8	
Māori Party	Cinnamon Whitlock		18	

=== Mana ===
2017 general election: Mana
Notes:	Blue background denotes an incumbent. Pink background denotes a current list MP. Yellow background denotes a retiring MP.			
Party	Candidate	Notes	List #	Source
Labour	Kris Faafoi		20	
Not A Party	Richard Goode	Contested electorate for ALCP in 2014		
Green	Jan Logie	Contested electorate in 2011 and 2014	6	
Independent	Gordon Marshall			
National	Euon Murrell		59	
ACT	Shan Ng		8	
United Future New Zealand	Kelleigh Sheffield-Cranstoun		2	

=== Māngere ===
2017 general election: Māngere
Notes:	Blue background denotes an incumbent. Pink background denotes a current list MP. Yellow background denotes a retiring MP.			
Party	Candidate	Notes	List #	Source
Communist League	Felicity Coggan	Contested Maungakiekie in 2014		
Green	Elaine Dyett		42	
National	Agnes Loheni		49	
Mana	James Papali'i	Contested electorate in 2014	3	
NZ First	Mataroa Paroro	Contested Hutt South in 2014	50	
Labour	William Sio		16	
Conservative	Kevin Stitt	Contested Papakura in 2014	4	
Māori Party	Esther Tofilau-Tevaga		15	

=== Manukau East ===
2017 general election: Manukau East
Notes:	Blue background denotes an incumbent. Pink background denotes a current list MP. Yellow background denotes a retiring MP.			
Party	Candidate	Notes	List #	Source
National	Kanwaljit Singh Bakshi	Contested electorate in 2014	32	
Māori Party	Tuilagi Saipele Esera		8	
NZ First	William Flesher		43	
Opportunities	Ted Faleauto Johnston		13	
Independent	Tamatoa Richmond			
Labour	Jenny Salesa		19	
ACT	Bhupinder Singh		4	
Green	Raj Singh		56	

=== Manurewa ===
2017 general election: Manurewa
Notes:	Blue background denotes an incumbent. Pink background denotes a current list MP. Yellow background denotes a retiring MP.			
Party	Candidate	Notes	List #	Source
National	Katrina Bungard		56	
NZ First	John Hall	Contested electorate in 2014	45	
Māori Party	Tasha Hohaia		14	
Conservative	Elliot Ikilei	Contested electorate in 2014	2	
Green	Teanau Tuiono		16	
Labour	Louisa Wall		26	
Retiring incumbents and withdrawn candidates
ACT	Sam Singh	Contesting Botany instead.	34	

=== Maungakiekie ===
2017 general election: Maungakiekie
Notes:	Blue background denotes an incumbent. Pink background denotes a current list MP. Yellow background denotes a retiring MP.			
Party	Candidate	Notes	List #	Source
National	Denise Lee	Contested electorate for United Future in 2008	63	
Māori Party	Manase Lua		12	
NZ First	Ken Mahon		55	
Outdoors	Derrick Paull		3	
Labour	Priyanca Radhakrishnan		12	
Green	Chlöe Swarbrick		7	
Communist League	Michael Tucker			
Retiring incumbents and withdrawn candidates
National	Sam Lotu-Iiga			

=== Mount Albert ===
2017 general election: Mount Albert
Notes:	Blue background denotes an incumbent. Pink background denotes a current list MP. Yellow background denotes a retiring MP.			
Party	Candidate	Notes	List #	Source
Labour	Jacinda Ardern		1	
Green	Julie Anne Genter	Contested electorate in 2017 by-election	3	
Conservative	Jeffrey Johnson	Contested electorate in 2014	11	
National	Melissa Lee	Contested electorate in 2014	31	
NZ First	Andrew Littlejohn		53	
Independent	Bruce Stockman			
Opportunities	Dan Thurston		16	
Human Rights Party	Anthony van den Heuvel			

=== Mount Roskill ===
2017 general election: Mount Roskill
Notes:	Blue background denotes an incumbent. Pink background denotes a current list MP. Yellow background denotes a retiring MP.			
Party	Candidate	Notes	List #	Source
NZ First	Mahesh Bindra	Contested electorate in 2014	10	
Conservative	Kathryn Davie		7	
Independent	Bishrul Izadeen			
Māori Party	John Kiria		9	
Democrats	Andrew Leitch	Contested electorate in 2016 by-election	6	
Green	Ricardo Menéndez March		21	
National	Parmjeet Parmar	Contested electorate in 2016 by-election	34	
Opportunities	Clint Ulyatt		15	
Labour	Michael Wood		27	

=== Napier ===
2017 general election: Napier
Notes:	Blue background denotes an incumbent. Pink background denotes a current list MP. Yellow background denotes a retiring MP.			
Party	Candidate	Notes	List #	Source
Conservative	Laurence Day		none	
National	David Elliott		55	
Māori Party	Maryanne Marsters		22	
Democrats	Karl Matthys		10	
Labour	Stuart Nash		11	
Green	Damon Rusden		54	
Retiring incumbents and withdrawn candidates
Democrats	Barry Pulford	Announced, but not on final candidate list	21	

=== Nelson ===
2017 general election: Nelson
Notes:	Blue background denotes an incumbent. Pink background denotes a current list MP. Yellow background denotes a retiring MP.			
Party	Candidate	Notes	List #	Source
Labour	Rachel Boyack		48	
Conservative	Simon Gutschlag			
Outdoors	David Haynes		2	
ACT	Paul Hufflett	Contested electorate in 2014	28	
Green	Matt Lawrey		18	
Money Free Party	Richard Osmaston	Contested electorate in 2014		
NZ First	Susan Sara		54	
National	Nick Smith		15	

=== New Lynn ===
2017 general election: New Lynn
Notes:	Blue background denotes an incumbent. Pink background denotes a current list MP. Yellow background denotes a retiring MP.			
Party	Candidate	Notes	List #	Source
NZ First	Peter Chan		26	
Conservative	Paul Davie	Contested Mount Roskill in 2014	9	
National	Paulo Garcia		50	
United Future	John Hubscher		7	
Democrats	Scott Macarthur		4	
Labour	Deborah Russell	Contested Rangitīkei in 2014	30	
Green	Leilani Tamu		17	
ACT	Richard Wells		14	
Māori Party	Karen Williams		23	
Retiring incumbents and withdrawn candidates
Labour	David Cunliffe	Retired before election		

=== New Plymouth ===
2017 general election: New Plymouth
Notes:	Blue background denotes an incumbent. Pink background denotes a current list MP. Yellow background denotes a retiring MP.			
Party	Candidate	Notes	List #	Source
Green	Stuart Bramhall		none	
ACT	Anneka Carlson		7	
NZ First	Murray Chong		30	
Labour	Corie Haddock	Contested Helensville in 2014	75	
Independent	Basil Lawrence			
National	Jonathan Young		35	

=== North Shore ===
2017 general election: North Shore
Notes:	Blue background denotes an incumbent. Pink background denotes a current list MP. Yellow background denotes a retiring MP.			
Party	Candidate	Notes	List #	Source
National	Maggie Barry		17	
Logic Party	Miriam Clements			
NZ First	Joshua Hubbard		24	
Opportunities	Matt Isbister		21	
ACT	Nick Kearney	Contested electorate in 2014	31	
Labour	Romy Udanga		47	
Retiring incumbents and withdrawn candidates
Green	Kennedy Graham	Announced, but not on final candidate list		

=== Northcote ===
2017 general election: Northcote
Notes:	Blue background denotes an incumbent. Pink background denotes a current list MP. Yellow background denotes a retiring MP.			
Party	Candidate	Notes	List #	Source
Democrats	Tricia Cheel	Contested East Coast Bays for Ban 1080 in 2014	22	
National	Jonathan Coleman		8	
Labour	Shanan Halbert	Contested List in 2014	51	
Green	Rebekah Jaung		47	
NZ First	Kym Koloni		38	
ACT	Tim Kronfeld	Contested electorate in 2014	30	
Retiring incumbents and withdrawn candidates
ACT	Bruce Haycock	Contested Upper Harbour instead.	29	

=== Northland ===
2017 general election: Northland
Notes:	Blue background denotes an incumbent. Pink background denotes a current list MP. Yellow background denotes a retiring MP.			
Party	Candidate	Notes	List #	Source
Green	Peter Hughes		none	
National	Matt King		51	
ACT	Craig Nelson	Contested electorate in 2014	32	
NZ First	Winston Peters		1	
Labour	Willow-Jean Prime	Contested electorate in 2014 & 2015 by-election	17	
Conservative	Melanie Taylor	Contested electorate in 2014	3	
Retiring incumbents and withdrawn candidates
Green	David Clendon	Announced, but not on final candidate list		
Legalise Cannabis	Maki Herbert	Announced, but not on final candidate list	1	
Democrats	David Wilson	Announced, but not on final candidate list	17	

=== Ōhāriu ===
2017 general election: Ōhāriu
Notes:	Blue background denotes an incumbent. Pink background denotes a current list MP. Yellow background denotes a retiring MP.			
Party	Candidate	Notes	List #	Source
NZ First	Lisa Close		22	
Opportunities	Jessica Hammond Doube		24	
National	Brett Hudson	Contested electorate in 2014	30	
ACT	Andie Moore		16	
United Future	Bale Nadakuitavuki	Previously standing in Wellington Central	4	
Labour	Greg O'Connor		41	
Green	Tane Woodley	Contested electorate in 2014	27	
Retiring incumbents and withdrawn candidates
United Future	Peter Dunne			

=== Ōtaki ===
2017 general election: Ōtaki
Notes:	Blue background denotes an incumbent. Pink background denotes a current list MP. Yellow background denotes a retiring MP.			
Party	Candidate	Notes	List #	Source
Green	Sam Ferguson		43	
ACT	Wayne Grattan		39	
National	Nathan Guy		12	
Independent	Sam Jennings			
Labour	Rob McCann	Contested electorate in 2014	none	
NZ First	Romuald Rudzki	Contested Rangitikei in 2014	35	
Opportunities	Piri-Hira Tukapua		8	
Retiring incumbents and withdrawn candidates
United Future	James Maxwell	Announced, but not on final candidate list		

=== Pakuranga ===
2017 general election: Pakuranga
Notes:	Blue background denotes an incumbent. Pink background denotes a current list MP. Yellow background denotes a retiring MP.			
Party	Candidate	Notes	List #	Source
National	Simeon Brown	Contested Manurewa in 2014	60	
Green	Guy Hunt		41	
NZ First	Suzanne Kelly		29	
Labour	Barry Kirker	Contested electorate in 2014	66	
Māori Party	Carrie Stoddart-Smith		11	
Retiring incumbents and withdrawn candidates
National	Maurice Williamson			

=== Palmerston North ===
2017 general election: Palmerston North
Notes:	Blue background denotes an incumbent. Pink background denotes a current list MP. Yellow background denotes a retiring MP.			
Party	Candidate	Notes	List #	Source
Money Free Party	Andrew Scott			
NZ First	Darroch Ball	Contested electorate in 2014	5	
Labour	Iain Lees-Galloway		14	
Green	Thomas Nash		24	
National	Adrienne Pierce		54	

=== Papakura ===
2017 general election: Papakura
Notes:	Blue background denotes an incumbent. Pink background denotes a current list MP. Yellow background denotes a retiring MP.			
Party	Candidate	Notes	List #	Source
Māori Party	Raewyn Bhana	Contested Manurewa in 2014	19	
National	Judith Collins		16	
NZ First	Toa Greening		32	
Labour	Jesse Pabla		54	

=== Port Hills ===
2017 general election: Port Hills
Notes:	Blue background denotes an incumbent. Pink background denotes a current list MP. Yellow background denotes a retiring MP.			
Party	Candidate	Notes	List #	Source
Labour	Ruth Dyson		24	
ACT	David Fox		none	
Democrats	Gary Gribben	Contested electorate in 2014	24	
National	Nuk Korako	Contested electorate in 2014	42	
NZ First	Denis O'Rourke	Contested electorate in 2011 and 2014	13	
Green	Eugenie Sage	Contested electorate in 2014	4	
Retiring incumbents and withdrawn candidates
Conservative	Roger Larkins	Contesting Tukituki instead.	10	

=== Rangitata ===
2017 general election: Rangitata
Notes:	Blue background denotes an incumbent. Pink background denotes a current list MP. Yellow background denotes a retiring MP.			
Party	Candidate	Notes	List #	Source
ACT	Tom Corbett	Contested electorate in 2014	19	
National	Andrew Falloon		61	
Labour	Jo Luxton		29	
Green	Mojo Mathers	Contested Christchurch East in 2014.	9	
Opportunities	Olly Wilson		5	
Retiring incumbents and withdrawn candidates
National	Jo Goodhew			

=== Rangitīkei ===
2017 general election: Rangitīkei
Notes:	Blue background denotes an incumbent. Pink background denotes a current list MP. Yellow background denotes a retiring MP.			
Party	Candidate	Notes	List #	Source
Conservative	Cedric Backhouse		none	
Green	Robin McCandless		31	
National	Ian McKelvie		37	
NZ First	Rob Stevenson		21	
Labour	Heather Warren		60	
ACT	Neil Wilson	Contested electorate in 2014	37	

=== Rimutaka ===
2017 general election: Rimutaka
Notes:	Blue background denotes an incumbent. Pink background denotes a current list MP. Yellow background denotes a retiring MP.			
Party	Candidate	Notes	List #	Source
Green	Stefan Grand-Meyer		30	
Labour	Chris Hipkins		7	
Conservative	Philip Lynch	Contested electorate in 2014	none	
NZ First	Talani Meikle		25	
National	Carolyn O'Fallon		58	
ACT	Grae O'Sullivan	Contested Hutt South in 2014	11	

=== Rodney ===
2017 general election: Rodney
Notes:	Blue background denotes an incumbent. Pink background denotes a current list MP. Yellow background denotes a retiring MP.			
Party	Candidate	Notes	List #	Source
Green	Harrison Burnard			
Labour	Marja Lubeck		32	
NZ First	Tracey Martin	Contested electorate in 2014	3	
National	Mark Mitchell		21	
Opportunities	Brittany Owens		20	
Retiring incumbents and withdrawn candidates
ACT	Beth Houlbrooke	Announced, but not on final candidate list	2	

=== Rongotai ===
2017 general election: Rongotai
Notes:	Blue background denotes an incumbent. Pink background denotes a current list MP. Yellow background denotes a retiring MP.			
Party	Candidate	Notes	List #	Source
Green	Teall Crossen		15	
Labour	Paul Eagle		34	
National	Chris Finlayson	Contested electorate in 2014	9	
NZ First	Geoff Mills		39	
Opportunities	Paddy Plunket		19	
Not a Party	Simon Smythe			
ACT	Chris Sole		36	
Conservative	Bruce Welsh	Contested electorate in 2014	8	
Retiring incumbents and withdrawn candidates
Labour	Annette King	Initially contesting list only before deciding to retire		
United Future	Sultan Eusoff	Announced, but not on final candidate list		

=== Rotorua ===
2017 general election: Rotorua
Notes:	Blue background denotes an incumbent. Pink background denotes a current list MP. Yellow background denotes a retiring MP.			
Party	Candidate	Notes	List #	Source
Māori Party	Wendy Biddle		21	
Independent	Rachel Clark			
Green	Richard Gillies		44	
National	Todd McClay		14	
Conservative	Owen Patterson		none	
Labour	Ben Sandford		58	
NZ First	Fletcher Tabuteau	Contested electorate in 2014	4	

=== Selwyn ===
2017 general election: Selwyn
Notes:	Blue background denotes an incumbent. Pink background denotes a current list MP. Yellow background denotes a retiring MP.			
Party	Candidate	Notes	List #	Source
National	Amy Adams		7	
Labour	Tony Condon		72	
ACT	Brian Davidson		20	
Green	Chrys Horn		none	
NZ First	Lindy Palmer		56	
Opportunities	Nicky Snoyink		11	

=== Tāmaki ===
2017 general election: Tāmaki
Notes:	Blue background denotes an incumbent. Pink background denotes a current list MP. Yellow background denotes a retiring MP.			
Party	Candidate	Notes	List #	Source
Independent	Penny Bright	Contested Helensville in 2014		
Green	Richard Leckinger		23	
Labour	Sam McDonald		61	
NZ First	Jenny Marcroft		9	
ACT	Michael Milne	Contested electorate in 2014		
National	Simon O'Connor		38	
Māori Party	Mele Pepa		25	

=== Taranaki-King Country ===
2017 general election: Taranaki-King Country
Notes:	Blue background denotes an incumbent. Pink background denotes a current list MP. Yellow background denotes a retiring MP.			
Party	Candidate	Notes	List #	Source
Labour	Hilary Humphrey		55	
National	Barbara Kuriger		28	
Green	Robert Moore	Contested electorate in 2011 and 2014	50	
Conservative	Allan Thomson		none	

=== Taupō ===
2017 general election: Taupō
Notes:	Blue background denotes an incumbent. Pink background denotes a current list MP. Yellow background denotes a retiring MP.			
Party	Candidate	Notes	List #	Source
Labour	Al'a Al-Bustanji		63	
Green	Julie Sandilands		55	
Conservative	Denis Shuker		none	
Outdoors	Alan Simmons	Contested electorate in 2014 for United Future	1	
National	Louise Upston		19	
Retiring incumbents and withdrawn candidates
Democrats	John Pemberton	Announced, but not on final candidate list		

=== Tauranga ===
2017 general election: Tauranga
Notes:	Blue background denotes an incumbent. Pink background denotes a current list MP. Yellow background denotes a retiring MP.			
Party	Candidate	Notes	List #	Source
Māori Party	Joseph Borell		none	
National	Simon Bridges		6	
Green	Emma-Leigh Hodge		45	
Democrats	Jason Jobsis	Contested Clutha-Southland in 2014	3	
Independent	Rusty Kane	Contested electorate in 2014		
Independent	Yvette Lamare	Contested electorate in 2014		
NZ First	Clayton Mitchell	Contested electorate in 2014	6	
ACT	Stuart Pedersen	Contested electorate in 2014	6	
United Future New Zealand	Ben Rickard	Contested Bay of Plenty in 2014	2	
Independent	Hugh Robb			
Labour	Jan Tinetti		15	

=== Te Atatū ===
2017 general election: Te Atatū
Notes:	Blue background denotes an incumbent. Pink background denotes a current list MP. Yellow background denotes a retiring MP.			
Party	Candidate	Notes	List #	Source
ACT	Stephen Fletcher	Contested electorate in 2014	38	
Green	Golriz Ghahraman		8	
Conservative	Marilyn Johnson		none	
National	Alfred Ngaro	Contested electorate in 2014	20	
Independent	Tua Schuster			
Labour	Phil Twyford		5	
NZ First	David Wilson		14	

=== Tukituki ===
2017 general election: Tukituki
Notes:	Blue background denotes an incumbent. Pink background denotes a current list MP. Yellow background denotes a retiring MP.			
Party	Candidate	Notes	List #	Source
NZ First	Joe Kairau		37	
Conservative	Roger Larkins		10	
Labour	Anna Lorck	Contested electorate in 2014	46	
Green	Chris Perley	Contested electorate in 2014	20	
Democrats	Dick Ryan	Contested electorate in 2014	15	
Future Youth	Allister Tosh			
National	Lawrence Yule	Incumbent Mayor of Hastings	67	
Retiring incumbents and withdrawn candidates
National	Craig Foss			

=== Upper Harbour ===
2017 general election: Upper Harbour
Notes:	Blue background denotes an incumbent. Pink background denotes a current list MP. Yellow background denotes a retiring MP.			
Party	Candidate	Notes	List #	Source
Labour	Jin An		53	
National	Paula Bennett		2	
Green	James Goodhue		39	
ACT	Bruce Haycock		27	
NZ First	Jane Johnston		47	
Retiring incumbents and withdrawn candidates
ACT	Tim Kronfeld	Contested Northcote instead.	32	

=== Waikato ===
2017 general election: Waikato
Notes:	Blue background denotes an incumbent. Pink background denotes a current list MP. Yellow background denotes a retiring MP.			
Party	Candidate	Notes	List #	Source
NZ First	Stu Husband		17	
Labour	Brooke Loader		57	
Green	Philippa Stevenson		58	
National	Tim van de Molen		66	
Retiring incumbents and withdrawn candidates
National	Lindsay Tisch			
Democrats	Carolyn McKenzie	Announced, but not on final candidate list		

=== Waimakariri ===
2017 general election: Waimakariri
Notes:	Blue background denotes an incumbent. Pink background denotes a current list MP. Yellow background denotes a retiring MP.			
Party	Candidate	Notes	List #	Source
Democrats	Peter Adcock-White	Contested electorate in 2014	20	
Green	Nikki Berry		none	
National	Matt Doocey		29	
Opportunities	Nicola Glenjarman		9	
ACT	Stuart Hawkins		26	
Conservative	Benjamin Price	Contested electorate in 2014	12	
NZ First	Richard Prosser	Contested electorate in 2014	15	
Māori Party	Aroha Reriti-Crofts	Contested electorate in 2014	none	
Labour	Dan Rosewarne		52	
Independent	Destiny Wiringi			

=== Wairarapa ===
2017 general election: Wairarapa
Notes:	Blue background denotes an incumbent. Pink background denotes a current list MP. Yellow background denotes a retiring MP.			
Party	Candidate	Notes	List #	Source
ACT	Roger Greenslade		25	
Independent	James Harold			
Green	John Hart	Contested electorate in 2014	12	
NZ First	Ron Mark	Contested electorate in 2014	2	
Labour	Kieran McAnulty	Contested electorate in 2014	38	
National	Alastair Scott		46	

=== Waitaki ===
2017 general election: Waitaki
Notes:	Blue background denotes an incumbent. Pink background denotes a current list MP. Yellow background denotes a retiring MP.			
Party	Candidate	Notes	List #	Source
Labour	Zelie Allan		none	
National	Jacqui Dean		23	
NZ First	Alexander Familton		40	
Conservative	Raymond Lum		none	
Opportunities	Kevin Neill		24	
Green	Patrick Wall		38	
Democrats	Hessel Van Wieren	Contested electorate in 2014	5	

=== Wellington Central ===
2017 general election: Wellington Central
Notes:	Blue background denotes an incumbent. Pink background denotes a current list MP. Yellow background denotes a retiring MP.			
Party	Candidate	Notes	List #	Source
NZ First	Andy Foster		18	
Independent	Gayaal Iddamalgoda			
Labour	Grant Robertson		4	
Independent	Peter Robinson	Contested electorate in 2014		
Green	James Shaw	contested electorate in 2011 and 2014	1	
Opportunities	Geoff Simmons	Contested Mount Albert in 2017 by-election	2	
ACT	Michael Warren		15	
Not A Party	Bob Wessex			
National	Nicola Willis		48	
Retiring incumbents and withdrawn candidates
United Future	Bale Nadakuitavuki	Moved to Ōhāriu after Peter Dunne retired		

=== West Coast-Tasman ===
2017 general election: West Coast-Tasman
Notes:	Blue background denotes an incumbent. Pink background denotes a current list MP. Yellow background denotes a retiring MP.			
Party	Candidate	Notes	List #	Source
Money Free Party	Liam Anderson			
Democrats	Jack Collin		11	
NZ First	Jackie Farrelly		31	
Green	Kate Fulton		26	
GOdsownNZ	Claire Holley	Contested electorate in 2014 for Conservatives		
ACT	Zeb Markland		none	
Labour	Damien O'Connor		18	
National	Maureen Pugh	Contested electorate in 2014 election	44	
Ban 1080	Peter Salter	Contested electorate in 2014	3	
Independent	Steven Wilkinson	Contested electorate in 2014		

=== Whanganui ===
2017 general election: Whanganui
Notes:	Blue background denotes an incumbent. Pink background denotes a current list MP. Yellow background denotes a retiring MP.			
Party	Candidate	Notes	List #	Source
ACT	Alan Davidson	Contested electorate in 2014	21	
National	Harete Hipango		62	
Labour	Steph Lewis		42	
Green	Nicola Patrick		51	
NZ First	Reginald Skipworth		36	
Retiring incumbents and withdrawn candidates
National	Chester Borrows			
ACT	Colin Anderson	Announced, but not on final candidate list	18	

=== Whangarei ===
2017 general election: Whangarei
Notes:	Blue background denotes an incumbent. Pink background denotes a current list MP. Yellow background denotes a retiring MP.			
Party	Candidate	Notes	List #	Source
ACT	Robin Grieve	Contested electorate in 2014	none	
Green	Ash Holwell		29	
NZ First	Shane Jones	Former Labour MP	8	
Democrats	Chris Leitch	Contested electorate in 2014	2	
Independent	Marie Minhinnick			
National	Shane Reti		45	
Labour	Tony Savage		56	
Conservative	Jim Taylor		none	

=== Wigram ===
2017 general election: Wigram
Notes:	Blue background denotes an incumbent. Pink background denotes a current list MP. Yellow background denotes a retiring MP.			
Party	Candidate	Notes	List #	Source
NZ First	Tane Apanui		44	
Economic Euthenics	Tubby Hansen	Contested electorate in 2014		
National	David Hiatt		52	
ACT	Ruth Knights			
Independent	Geoff McTague			
Democrats	John Ring	Contested electorate in 2014	13	
Green	Richard Wesley		40	
Labour	Megan Woods		6	

== Māori electorates ==
=== Hauraki-Waikato ===
2017 general election: Hauraki-Waikato
Notes:	Blue background denotes an incumbent. Pink background denotes a current list MP. Yellow background denotes a retiring MP.			
Party	Candidate	Notes	List #	Source
Labour	Nanaia Mahuta		none	
Māori Party	Rahui Papa		3	

=== Ikaroa-Rāwhiti ===
2017 general election: Ikaroa-Rāwhiti
Notes:	Blue background denotes an incumbent. Pink background denotes a current list MP. Yellow background denotes a retiring MP.			
Party	Candidate	Notes	List #	Source
Māori Party	Marama Fox	Contested electorate in 2014	1	
Green	Elizabeth Kerekere		19	
Labour	Meka Whaitiri		none	

=== Tāmaki Makaurau ===
2017 general election: Tāmaki Makaurau
Notes:	Blue background denotes an incumbent. Pink background denotes a current list MP. Yellow background denotes a retiring MP.			
Party	Candidate	Notes	List #	Source
Green	Marama Davidson	Contested electorate in 2014	2	
Labour	Peeni Henare		none	
Māori Party	Shane Taurima		4	

=== Te Tai Hauāuru ===
2017 general election: Te Tai Hauāuru
Notes:	Blue background denotes an incumbent. Pink background denotes a current list MP. Yellow background denotes a retiring MP.			
Party	Candidate	Notes	List #	Source
Green	Jack McDonald	Contested electorate in 2011 and 2014	11	
Labour	Adrian Rurawhe		none	
Māori Party	Howie Tamati		6	
Independent	Wikitoria Waitai-Rapana			

=== Te Tai Tokerau ===
2017 general election: Te Tai Tokerau
Notes:	Blue background denotes an incumbent. Pink background denotes a current list MP. Yellow background denotes a retiring MP.			
Party	Candidate	Notes	List #	Source
Labour	Kelvin Davis		2	
Mana	Hone Harawira	MP 2005–14	1	
Legalise Cannabis	Maki Herbert	Contested electorate in 2011	1	
Green	Godfrey Rudolph		53	

=== Te Tai Tonga ===
2017 general election: Te Tai Tonga
Notes:	Blue background denotes an incumbent. Pink background denotes a current list MP. Yellow background denotes a retiring MP.			
Party	Candidate	Notes	List #	Source
Legalise Cannabis	Emma-Jane Mihaere Kingi	Contested electorate in 2014	5	
Māori Party	Mei Reedy-Taare		5	
Labour	Rino Tirikatene		none	
Green	Metiria Turei	contested Dunedin North in 2014	none	

=== Waiariki ===
2017 general election: Waiariki
Notes:	Blue background denotes an incumbent. Pink background denotes a current list MP. Yellow background denotes a retiring MP.			
Party	Candidate	Notes	List #	Source
Māori Party	Te Ururoa Flavell		2	
Labour	Tāmati Coffey	Contested Rotorua in 2014	35	
