= Party lists in the 2017 New Zealand general election =

New Zealand political candidates in the MMP era
Year	Party list	Candidates
1996	party lists	by electorate
1999	party lists	by electorate
2002	party lists	by electorate
2005	party lists	by electorate
2008	party lists	by electorate
2011	party lists	by electorate
2014	party lists	by electorate
2017	party lists	by electorate
2020	party lists	by electorate
2023	party lists	by electorate
2026	party lists	by electorate

The 2017 New Zealand general election was held on Saturday, 23 September 2017, to determine the membership of the 52nd New Zealand Parliament. Parliament has 120 seats, and 71 were filled by electorate MPs, with the remaining 49 from ranked party lists. Writ day, i.e. the day when the Governor-General issues a formal direction to the Electoral Commission to hold the election, was set for Wednesday, 23 August 2017. As stipulated in section 127 of the Electoral Act 1993, the writ will set a date by which registered parties must submit a "list of candidates for election to the seats reserved for those members of Parliament elected from lists". Party lists must have been submitted by Monday, 28 August, at noon. On Wednesday, 30 August, the Electoral Commission released details of candidates for election, party lists, and the polling places. This page lists candidates by party, including their ranking on a list.

== Incumbent parliamentary parties ==
=== ACT Party ===
ACT New Zealand released its list on 9 July 2017.

Rank	Name	Incumbency	Contesting electorate	Previous rank	Change	Initial results	Later changes
1	David Seymour	Electorate	Epsom	—	—	✓ Won Epsom	
2	Beth Houlbrooke			4	+2		
3	Brooke van Velden		Auckland Central	—	—		
4	Bhupinder Singh		Manukau East	—	—		
5	Stephen Berry		East Coast Bays	6	+1		
6	Stuart Pedersen		Tauranga	—	—		
7	Anneka Carlson		New Plymouth	—	—		
8	Shan Ng		Mana	—	—		
9	Sam Purchas		Dunedin North	—	—		
10	Toni Severin		Christchurch East	11	+1		
11	Grae O’Sullivan		Rimutaka	37	+26		
12	Richard Evans		Kaikōura	—	—		
13	James McDowall		Hamilton East	—	—		
14	Richard Wells		New Lynn	—	—		
15	Michael Warren		Wellington Central	—	—		
16	Andi Moore		Ōhariu	—	—		
17	Andy Parkins		Hutt South	—	—		
18	Bruce Carley		Bay of Plenty	23	+5		
19	Tom Corbett		Rangitata	24	+5		
20	Brian Davidson		Selwyn	—	—		
21	Alan Davidson		Whanganui	—	—		
22	Dan Doughty		Dunedin South	—	—		
23	Alex Evans		Helensville	—	—		
24	Paul Gilbert		Ilam	27	+3		
25	Roger Greenslade		Wairarapa	—	—		
26	Stuart Hawkins		Waimakariri	—	—		
27	Bruce Haycock		Upper Harbour	30	+3		
28	Paul Hufflett		Nelson	—	—		
29	Nick Kearney		North Shore	—	—		
30	Tim Kronfeld		Northcote	20	−10		
31	Joe Misselbrook			—	—		
32	Craig Nelson		Northland	—	—		
33	Joshua Perry			—	—		
34	Sam Singh		Manurewa	—	—		
35	Anthony Smith		Hunua	—	—		
36	Chris Sole		Rongotai	—	—		
37	Neil Wilson		Rangitikei	41	+4		
38	Stephen Fletcher		Te Atatū	—	—		
39	Wayne Grattan		Ōtaki	—	—		

=== Green Party ===
The Green Party announced its initial list of 46 candidates for member consultation on 2 April 2017. The final list was released on 30 May 2017. On 7 August 2017, Kennedy Graham (originally 8th on the list) and David Clendon (originally 16th) announced that they would remove themselves from the list, following Metiria Turei's admission of historic benefit fraud. On 8 August 2017, Hutt South candidate Susanne Ruthven withdrew citing work commitments. Turei resigned as co-leader and withdrew from the Green Party list on 9 August 2017.

Rank	Name	Incumbency	Contesting electorate	Previous rank	Change	Initial results	Later changes
1	James Shaw	List	Wellington Central	12	+11	✓ Elected from list	
2	Marama Davidson	List	Tamaki Makaurau	15	+13	✓ Elected from list	
3	Julie Anne Genter	List	Mount Albert	8	+5	✓ Elected from list	
4	Eugenie Sage	List	Port Hills	4	0	✓ Elected from list	
5	Gareth Hughes	List	East Coast	5	0	✓ Elected from list	
6	Jan Logie	List	Mana	10	+4	✓ Elected from list	
7	Chlöe Swarbrick		Maungakiekie	—	—	✓ Elected from list	
8	Golriz Ghahraman		Te Atatū	—	—	✓ Elected from list	
9	Mojo Mathers	List	Rangitata	9	0	✗ Lost seat	
10	Barry Coates	List	Epsom	16	+6	✗ Lost seat	
11	Jack McDonald		Te Tai Hauauru	20	+9		
12	John Hart		Wairarapa	17	+5		
13	Denise Roche	List	Auckland Central	13	0	✗ Lost seat	
14	Hayley Holt		Helensville	—	—		
15	Teall Crossen		Rongotai	—	—		
16	Teanau Tuiono		Manurewa	—	—		
17	Leilani Tamu		New Lynn	—	—		
18	Matt Lawrey		Nelson	—	—		
19	Elizabeth Kerekere		Ikaroa-Rawhiti	—	—		
20	Chris Perley		Tukituki	29	+9		
21	Ricardo Menéndez March		Mount Roskill	—	—		
22	Julie Zhu		Botany	—	—		
23	Richard Leckinger		Tāmaki	23	0		
24	Thomas Nash		Palmerston North	—	—		
25	Sam Taylor		Hamilton East	—	—		
26	Kate Fulton		West Coast-Tasman	—	—		
27	Tane Woodley		Ōhāriu	28	+1		
28	Jo Wrigley		Hamilton West	—	—		
29	Ash Holwell		Whangarei	—	—		
30	Stefan Grand-Meyer		Rimutaka	—	—		
31	Robin McCandless		Rangitikei	—	—		
32	Niki Bould		Dunedin North	—	—		
33	Shane Gallagher		Dunedin South	43	+10		
34	Scott Summerfield		Coromandel	—	—		
35	Rochelle Surendran		Invercargill	—	—		
36	Bridget Walsh			—	—		
37	Rachael Goldsmith		Clutha-Southland	30	−7		
38	Patrick Wall		Waitaki	—	—		
39	James Goodhue		Upper Harbour	—	—		
40	Richard Wesley		Wigram	33	−7		
41	Guy Hunt		Pakuranga	—	—		
42	Elaine Dyett		Māngere	—	—		
43	Sam Ferguson		Ōtaki	—	—		
44	Richard Gillies		Rotorua	—	—		
45	Emma-Leigh Hodge		Tauranga	—	—		
46	Chrys Horn			—	—		
47	Rebekah Jaung		Northcote	—	—		
48	David Lee		Ilam	—	—		
49	Nicholas Mayne		East Coast Bays	—	—		
50	Robert Moore		Taranaki-King Country	—	—		
51	Nicola Patrick		Whanganui	—	—		
52	Peter Richardson			—	—		
53	Godfrey Rudolph		Te Tai Tokerau	—	—		
54	Damon Rusden		Napier	—	—		
55	Julie Sandilands		Taupō	—	—		
56	Raj Singh		Manukau East	—	—		
57	Nicola Smith		Kelston	—	—		
58	Philippa Stevenson		Waikato	—	—		
59	Cathy Sweet		Christchurch East	—	—		

=== Labour Party ===
The Labour Party released its list on 2 May 2017.

On 21 March 2017, Labour announced that its sitting Māori electorate MPs would not contest the party list, standing for their electorates only.

Labour announced a revised list on 15 August 2017 following a leadership change.

Rank	Name	Incumbency	Contesting electorate	Previous rank	Change	Initial results	Later changes
1	Jacinda Ardern	Electorate	Mount Albert	5	+4	✓ Won Mount Albert	
2	Kelvin Davis	Electorate	Te Tai Tokerau	18	+16	✓ Won Te Tai Tokerau	
3	Andrew Little	List		11	+8	✓ Elected from list	
4	Grant Robertson	Electorate	Wellington Central	3	−1	✓ Won Wellington Central	
5	Phil Twyford	Electorate	Te Atatū	7	+2	✓ Won Te Atatū	
6	Megan Woods	Electorate	Wigram	20	+14	✓ Won Wigram	
7	Chris Hipkins	Electorate	Rimutaka	9	+2	✓ Won Rimutaka	
8	Carmel Sepuloni	Electorate	Kelston	29	+21	✓ Won Kelston	
9	David Clark	Electorate	Dunedin North	26	+17	✓ Won Dunedin North	
10	David Parker	List	Epsom	2	−8	✓ Elected from list	
11	Stuart Nash	Electorate	Napier	—	—	✓ Won Napier	
12	Priyanca Radhakrishnan		Maungakiekie	23	+11	✓ Elected from list	
13	Raymond Huo	List		21	+8	✓ Elected from list	
14	Iain Lees-Galloway	Electorate	Palmerston North	24	+10	✓ Won Palmerston North	
15	Jan Tinetti		Tauranga	—	—	✓ Elected from list	
16	William Sio	Electorate	Māngere	14	−2	✓ Won Māngere	
17	Willow-Jean Prime		Northland	34	+17	✓ Elected from list	
18	Damien O'Connor	Electorate	West Coast-Tasman	22	+4	✓ Won West Coast-Tasman	
19	Jenny Salesa	Electorate	Manukau East	31	+12	✓ Won Manukau East	
20	Kris Faafoi	Electorate	Mana	—	—	✓ Won Mana	
21	Kiri Allan		East Coast	—	—	✓ Elected from list	
22	Willie Jackson	(Former MP)		—	—	✓ Elected from list	
23	Clare Curran	Electorate	Dunedin South	—	—	✓ Won Dunedin South	
24	Ruth Dyson	Electorate	Port Hills	—	—	✓ Won Port Hills	
25	Poto Williams	Electorate	Christchurch East	28	+3	✓ Won Christchurch East	
26	Louisa Wall	Electorate	Manurewa	12	−14	✓ Won Manurewa	
27	Michael Wood	Electorate	Mount Roskill	39	+12	✓ Won Mount Roskill	
28	Ginny Andersen		Hutt South	37	+9	✓ Elected from list	
29	Jo Luxton		Rangitata	—	—	✓ Elected from list	
30	Deborah Russell		New Lynn	33	+3	✓ Won New Lynn	
31	Liz Craig		Invercargill	32	+1	✓ Elected from list	
32	Marja Lubeck		Rodney	—	—	✓ Elected from list	
33	Trevor Mallard	Electorate		—	—	✓ Elected from list	
34	Paul Eagle		Rongotai	—	—	✓ Won Rongotai	
35	Tāmati Coffey		Waiariki	30	−5	✓ Won Waiariki	
36	Jamie Strange		Hamilton East	54	+18	✓ Elected from list	
37	Anahila Kanongata'a-Suisuiki			49	+12	✓ Elected from list	
38	Kieran McAnulty		Wairarapa	—	—	✓ Elected from list	
39	Angie Warren-Clark		Bay of Plenty	—	—	✓ Elected from list	
40	Helen White		Auckland Central	—	—		
41	Greg O'Connor		Ōhāriu	—	—	✓ Won Ōhāriu	
42	Steph Lewis		Whanganui	—	—		
43	Duncan Webb		Christchurch Central	—	—	✓ Won Christchurch Central	
44	Lemauga Lydia Sosene			—	—		
45	Janette Walker		Kaikōura	46	+1		
46	Anna Lorck		Tukituki	—	—		
47	Romy Udanga		North Shore	—	—		
48	Rachel Boyack		Nelson	—	—		
49	Sarb Johal			—	—		
50	Naisi Chen		East Coast Bays	—	—		
51	Shanan Halbert		Northcote	48	−3		
52	Dan Rosewarne		Waimakariri	—	—		
53	Jin An		Upper Harbour	—	—		
54	Jesse Pabla		Papakura	—	—		
55	Hilary Humphrey		Taranaki-King Country	—	—		
56	Tony Savage		Whangarei	—	—		
57	Brooke Loader		Waikato	—	—		
58	Ben Sandford		Rotorua	—	—		
59	Kurt Taogaga		Helensville	—	—		
60	Heather Warren		Rangitīkei	—	—		
61	Sam McDonald		Tāmaki	—	—		
62	Cherie Chapman		Clutha-Southland	—	—		
63	Al'a Al-Bustanji		Taupō	—	—		
64	Baljit Kaur		Hunua	—	—		
65	Linsey Higgins			—	—		
66	Barry Kirker		Pakuranga	—	—		
67	Tofik Mamedov		Botany	60	−7		
68	Michelle Lomax			—	—		
69	Nathaniel Blomfield		Coromandel	—	—		
70	Gaurav Sharma		Hamilton West	—	—		
71	Anthony Rimell		Ilam	—	—		
72	Tony Condon		Selwyn	—	—		
73	Sarah Packer			—	—		
74	Andy Begg			—	—		
75	Corie Haddock		New Plymouth	53	−22		

=== Māori Party ===
The Māori Party released its list on 30 August 2017.

Rank	Name	Incumbency	Contesting electorate	Previous rank	Change	Initial results	Later changes
1	Marama Fox	List	Ikaroa-Rawhiti	2	+1	✗ Lost seat	
2	Te Ururoa Flavell	Electorate	Waiariki	1	−1	✗ Lost seat	
3	Rahui Papa		Hauraki-Waikato	—	—		
4	Shane Taurima		Tamaki Makaurau	—	—		
5	Mei Reedy-Taare		Te Tai Tonga	—	—		
6	Howie Tamati		Te Tai Hauauru	—	—		
7	Hinurewa Te Hau			13	+6		
8	Tuilagi Saipele Esera		Manukau East	—	—		
9	John Kiria		Mount Roskill	—	—		
10	Te Waka McLeod			—	—		
11	Carrie Stoddart-Smith		Pakuranga	—	—		
12	Manase Lua		Maungakiekie	—	—		
13	Wetex Kang		Botany	—	—		
14	Tasha Hohaia		Manurewa	—	—		
15	Esther Tofilau-Tevaga		Māngere	—	—		
16	Tina Porou			—	—		
17	George Ngatai			—	—		
18	Cinnamon Whitlock		Kelston	—	—		
19	Raewyn Bhana			10	−9		
20	Ngarangi Chapman			—	—		
21	Wendy Biddle		Rotorua	—	—		
22	Maryanne Marsters		Napier	—	—		
23	Karen Williams		New Lynn	—	—		
24	Amiria Te Whiu			—	—		
25	Mele Pepa		Tāmaki	—	—		
26	Tae Moala Tu’inukuafe			—	—		

=== National Party ===
The National Party released its list on 30 July 2017.

Rank	Name	Incumbency	Contesting electorate	Previous rank	Change	Initial results	Later changes
1	Bill English	List		2	+1	✓ Elected from list	✗ Left parliament in 2018
2	Paula Bennett	Electorate	Upper Harbour	9	+7	✓ Won Upper Harbour	
3	David Carter	List		3	0	✓ Elected from list	
4	Steven Joyce	List		5	+1	✓ Elected from list	✗ Left parliament in 2018
5	Gerry Brownlee	Electorate	Ilam	4	−1	✓ Won Ilam	
6	Simon Bridges	Electorate	Tauranga	18	+12	✓ Won Tauranga	
7	Amy Adams	Electorate	Selwyn	15	+8	✓ Won Selwyn	
8	Jonathan Coleman	Electorate	Northcote	10	+2	✓ Won Northcote	✗ Left parliament in 2018
9	Chris Finlayson	List	Rongotai	8	−1	✓ Elected from list	✗ Left parliament in 2019
10	Michael Woodhouse	List	Dunedin North	20	+10	✓ Elected from list	
11	Anne Tolley	Electorate	East Coast	12	+1	✓ Won East Coast	
12	Nathan Guy	Electorate	Otaki	16	+4	✓ Won Otaki	
13	Nikki Kaye	Electorate	Auckland Central	19	+6	✓ Won Auckland Central	
14	Todd McClay	Electorate	Rotorua	23	+9	✓ Won Rotorua	
15	Nick Smith	Electorate	Nelson	13	−2	✓ Won Nelson	
16	Judith Collins	Electorate	Papakura	6	−10	✓ Won Papakura	
17	Maggie Barry	Electorate	North Shore	40	+23	✓ Won North Shore	
18	Paul Goldsmith	List	Epsom	30	+12	✓ Elected from list	
19	Louise Upston	Electorate	Taupō	27	+8	✓ Won Taupō	
20	Alfred Ngaro	List	Te Atatū	34	+14	✓ Elected from list	
21	Mark Mitchell	Electorate	Rodney	42	+21	✓ Won Rodney	
22	Nicky Wagner	Electorate	Christchurch Central	25	+3	✓ Elected from list	
23	Jacqui Dean	Electorate	Waitaki	36	+13	✓ Won Waitaki	
24	David Bennett	Electorate	Hamilton East	37	+13	✓ Won Hamilton East	
25	Tim Macindoe	Electorate	Hamilton West	28	+3	✓ Won Hamilton West	
26	Scott Simpson	Electorate	Coromandel	45	+19	✓ Won Coromandel	
27	Jami-Lee Ross	Electorate	Botany	29	+2	✓ Won Botany	
28	Barbara Kuriger	Electorate	Taranaki-King Country	58	+30	✓ Won Taranaki-King Country	
29	Matt Doocey	Electorate	Waimakariri	56	+27	✓ Won Waimakariri	
30	Brett Hudson	List	Ōhāriu	39	+9	✓ Elected from list	
31	Melissa Lee	List	Mount Albert	31	0	✓ Elected from list	
32	Kanwaljit Singh Bakshi	List	Manukau East	32	0	✓ Elected from list	
33	Jian Yang	List		33	0	✓ Elected from list	
34	Parmjeet Parmar	List	Mount Roskill	48	+14	✓ Elected from list	
35	Jonathan Young	Electorate	New Plymouth	38	+3	✓ Won New Plymouth	
36	Jo Hayes	List	Christchurch East	47	+11	✓ Elected from list	
37	Ian McKelvie	Electorate	Rangitīkei	41	+4	✓ Won Rangitīkei	
38	Simon O'Connor	Electorate	Tāmaki	43	+5	✓ Won Tāmaki	
39	Andrew Bayly	Electorate	Hunua	55	+16	✓ Won Hunua	
40	Chris Bishop	List	Hutt South	49	+9	✓ Won Hutt South	
41	Sarah Dowie	Electorate	Invercargill	57	+16	✓ Won Invercargill	
42	Nuk Korako	List	Port Hills	50	+8	✓ Elected from list	✗ Left parliament in 2019
43	Todd Muller	Electorate	Bay of Plenty	59	+16	✓ Won Bay of Plenty	
44	Maureen Pugh	List	West Coast-Tasman	52	+8	✗ Lost seat	✓ Replaced Bill English in 2018
45	Shane Reti	Electorate	Whangarei	60	+15	✓ Won Whangarei	
46	Alastair Scott	Electorate	Wairarapa	61	+15	✓ Won Wairarapa	
47	Stuart Smith	Electorate	Kaikōura	62	+15	✓ Won Kaikōura	
48	Nicola Willis		Wellington Central	—	—		✓ Replaced Steven Joyce in 2018
49	Agnes Loheni		Māngere	—	—		✓ Replaced Chris Finlayson in 2019
50	Paulo Garcia		New Lynn	—	—		✓ Replaced Nuk Korako in 2019
51	Matt King		Northland	—	—	✓ Won Northland	
52	David Hiatt		Wigram	—	—		
53	Matt Gregory		Dunedin South	—	—		
54	Adrienne Pierce		Palmerston North	—	—		
55	David Elliott		Napier	—	—		
56	Katrina Bungard		Manurewa	—	—		
57	Bala Beeram		Kelston	—	—		
58	Carolyn O'Fallon		Rimutaka	74	+16		
59	Euon Murrell		Mana	—	—		
60	Simeon Brown		Pakuranga	64	+4	✓ Won Pakuranga	
61	Andrew Falloon		Rangitata	—	—	✓ Won Rangitata	✗ Left parliament in 2020
62	Harete Hipango		Whanganui	—	—	✓ Won Whanganui	
63	Denise Lee		Maungakiekie	—	—	✓ Won Maungakiekie	
64	Chris Penk		Helensville	68	+4	✓ Won Helensville	
65	Erica Stanford		East Coast Bays	—	—	✓ Won East Coast Bays	
66	Tim van de Molen		Waikato	—	—	✓ Won Waikato	
67	Lawrence Yule		Tukituki	—	—	✓ Won Tukituki	
68	Hamish Walker		Clutha-Southland	65	−3	✓ Won Clutha-Southland	
69	Sarah Jo Barley			—	—		
70	Lisa Whyte			—	—		
71	Linda Cooper			69	−2		
72	Dan Bidois			—	—		✓ Replaced Jonathan Coleman in the 2018 Northcote by-election
73	Rahul Sirigiri			—	—		
74	Hadleigh Reid			—	—		
75	Graham Collins			—	—		

=== New Zealand First ===
Rank	Name	Incumbency	Contesting electorate	Previous rank	Change	Initial results	Later changes
1	Winston Peters	Electorate	Northland	1	0	✓ Elected from list	
2	Ron Mark	List	Wairarapa	9	+7	✓ Elected from list	
3	Tracey Martin	List	Rodney	2	−1	✓ Elected from list	
4	Fletcher Tabuteau	List	Rotorua	4	0	✓ Elected from list	
5	Darroch Ball	List	Palmerston North	10	+5	✓ Elected from list	
6	Clayton Mitchell	List	Tauranga	6	0	✓ Elected from list	
7	Mark Patterson		Clutha-Southland	—	—	✓ Elected from list	
8	Shane Jones	(Former MP)	Whangarei	—	—	✓ Elected from list	
9	Jenny Marcroft		Tamaki	—	—	✓ Elected from list	
10	Mahesh Bindra	List	Mount Roskill	11	+1	✗ Lost seat	
11	Pita Paraone	List	Hamilton East	8	−3	✗ Lost seat	
12	Ria Bond	List	Invercargill	12	0	✗ Lost seat	
13	Denis O'Rourke	List	Port Hills	7	−6	✗ Lost seat	
14	David Wilson		Te Atatū	—	—		
15	Richard Prosser	List	Waimakariri	3	−12	✗ Lost seat	
16	Jon Reeves		Hunua	15	−1		
17	Stu Husband		Waikato	—	—		
18	Andy Foster		Wellington Central	—	—		
19	Melanie Mark-Shadbolt		Christchurch East	—	—		
20	Helen Peterson		Helensville	—	—		
21	Rob Stevenson		Rangitīkei	—	—		
22	Lisa Close		Ōhāriu	—	—		
23	Jamie Arbuckle		Kaikōura	—	—		
24	Joshua Hubbard		North Shore	—	—		
25	Talani Meikle		Rimutaka	—	—		
26	Peter Chan		New Lynn	—	—		
27	Lester Gray		Bay of Plenty	—	—		
28	Anne Degia-Pala		Kelston	21	−7		
29	Suzanne Kelly		Pakuranga	—	—		
30	Murray Chong		New Plymouth	—	—		
31	Jackie Farrelly		West Coast-Tasman	—	—		
32	Toa Greening		Papakura	—	—		
33	Julian Paul		Epsom	—	—		
34	Shayne Wihongi		Hamilton West	—	—		
35	Romuald Rudzki		Ōtaki	14	−21		
36	Reg Skipworth		Whanganui	—	—		
37	Joe Kairau		Tukituki	—	—		
38	Kym Koloni		Northcote	—	—		
39	Geoff Mills		Rongotai	—	—		
40	Alexander Familton		Waitaki	—	—		
41	Anne-Marie Andrews		Coromandel	—	—		
42	Julian Tilley		East Coast	—	—		
43	William Flesher		Manukau East	—	—		
44	Tane Apanui		Wigram	—	—		
45	John Hall		Manurewa	27	−18		
46	Warren Voight		Dunedin North	(Democrats: 5)	−41		
47	Jane Johnston		Upper Harbour	—	—		
48	Frank Edwards		Auckland Central	—	—		
49	Ilja Ruppeldt		East Coast Bays	—	—		
50	Mataroa Paroro		Mangere	13	−37		
51	Kerry Rushton		Dunedin South	—	—		
52	Alok Gupta		Hutt South	—	—		
53	Andrew Littlejohn		Mount Albert	—	—		
54	Susan Sara		Nelson	—	—		
55	Ken Mahon		Maungakiekie	—	—		
56	Lindy Palmer		Selwyn	—	—		

=== United Future ===
United Future lodged the following party list with the Electoral Commission.

Rank	Name	Incumbency	Contesting electorate	Previous rank	Change	Initial results	Later changes
1	Damian Light		Botany	3	+2		
2	Ben Rickard		Tauranga	5	+3		
3	Kelleigh Sheffield-Cranstoun		Mana	—	—		
4	Bale Nadakuitavuki		Ōhāriu	—	—		
5	Judy Turner	(Former MP)	East Coast	—	—		
6	Quentin Todd		Hamilton West	9	+3		
7	John Hubscher		New Lynn	—	—		
8	John Foster		Kaikoura	—	—		
9	Ian Gaskin		Christchurch Central	—	—		
10	JB Woolston			—	—		

== Other registered parties ==
=== Ban 1080 ===
The Ban 1080 Party's list was released on 31 August 2017.

Rank	Name	Incumbency	Contesting electorate	Previous rank	Change	Initial results	Later changes
1	Clyde Graf		Coromandel	—	—		
2	Bill Wallace			2	0		
3	Peter Salter		West Coast-Tasman	3	0		
4	Brian Adams		Clutha-Southland	—	—		
5	Carol Sawyer			—	—		
6	James Hilton			—	—		
7	Glen Tomlinson			5	−2		
8	Kenneth Hanson			—	—		
9	Mary Molloy			—	—		

=== Conservative Party ===
The following are the Conservative Party candidates for 2017.

Rank	Name	Incumbency	Contesting electorate	Previous rank	Change	Initial results	Later changes
1	Leighton Baker		Epsom	—	—		
2	Elliot Ikilei		Manurewa	20	+18		
3	Melanie Taylor		Northland	7	+4		
4	Kevin Stitt		Mangere	—	—		
5	Martin Frauenstein		Ilam	—	—		
6	Lachie Ashton		Clutha-Southland	—	—		
7	Kathryn Davie		Mount Roskill	—	—		
8	Bruce Welsh		Rongotai	—	—		
9	Paul Davie		New Lynn	—	—		
10	Roger Larkins		Port Hills	—	—		
11	Jeffrey Johnson		Mount Albert	—	—		
12	Benjamin Price		Waimakiriri	—	—		

=== Democrats for Social Credit ===
The New Zealand Democratic Party for Social Credit released a party list.

Rank	Name	Incumbency	Contesting electorate	Previous rank	Change	Initial results	Later changes
1	Stephnie de Ruyter			1	0		
2	Chris Leitch		Whangarei	2	0		
3	Jason Jobsis			9	+6		
4	Scott MacArthur		New Lynn	—	—		
5	Hessel Van Wieren		Waitaki	7	+2		
6	Andrew Leitch		Mount Roskill	8	+2		
7	Katherine Ransom			4	−3		
8	Simon Briggs			—	—		
9	Mischele Rhodes		Hamilton East	15	+6		
10	Karl Matthys		Napier	—	—		
11	Jack Collin			—	—		
12	Heather McConachy			—	—		
13	John Ring		Wigram	23	+10		
14	John Pemberton		Taupō	3	−11		
15	Dick Ryan		Tukituki	13	−2		
16	Carolyn McKenzie		Waikato	11	−5		
17	David Wilson		Northland	20	+3		
18	Heather Marion Smith			26	+8		
19	Tracy Livingston-Pooley		Bay of Plenty	19	0		
20	Peter Adcock-White		Waimakiriri	18	−2		
21	Barry Pulford		Napier	17	−4		
22	Tricia Cheel		Northcote	(Ban 1080: 6)	−16		
23	John McCaskey		Kaikoura	22	−1		
24	Gary Gribben		Port Hills	27	+3		
25	Miriam Mowat		Dunedin North	24	−1		
26	Robert Richards			35	+9		

=== Internet Party ===
The following are the Internet Party candidates for 2017.

Rank	Name	Incumbency	Contesting electorate	Previous rank	Change	Initial results	Later changes
1	Suzie Dawson			—	—		
2	Ben Cooney			—	—		
3	Daymond Goulder-Horobin			—	—		
4	Jo Booth			—	—		
5	Blake Bedford-Palmer			—	—		
6	Bruce King			—	—		
7	Nicholas Smith			—	—		
8	Jourdan Turner			—	—		

=== Legalise Cannabis Party ===
The following candidates will stand for the Aotearoa Legalise Cannabis Party in 2017.

Rank	Name	Incumbency	Contesting electorate	Previous rank	Change	Initial results	Later changes
1	Maki Herbert		Te Tai Tokerau	—	—		
2	Jeff Lye		Kelston	5	+3		
3	Paula Lambert			—	—		
4	Mike Britnell			—	—		
5	Emma-Jane Mihaere Kingi		Te Tai Tonga	3	−2		
6	Vineet Prasad Shiriwastow			—	—		
7	Jonee Saxby-Koning			—	—		
8	Adrian McDermott		Dunedin South	11	+3		
9	Janine Shufflebotham			—	—		
10	Steven Wilkinson			—	—		
11	Jeanette Saxby			—	—		
12	Tony Brown			—	—		
13	Rebecca Robin			—	—		
14	Geoff McTague			—	—		

=== Mana Movement ===
Mana Movement's list was released on 31 August 2017.

Rank	Name	Incumbency	Contesting electorate	Previous rank	Change	Initial results	Later changes
1	Hone Harawira	(Former MP)	Te Tai Tokerau	1	0		
2	Lisa McNab			—	—		
3	James Papali'i		Māngere	9	+6		
4	Tracey-lee Repia			—	—		

=== The Opportunities Party ===
The Opportunities Party released its list on 28 August 2017.

Rank	Name	Incumbency	Contesting electorate	Previous rank	Change	Initial results	Later changes
1	Gareth Morgan			—	—		
2	Geoff Simmons		Wellington Central	—	—		
3	Teresa Moore		East Coast Bays	(Greens: 26)	+23		
4	Buddy Mikaere			—	—		
5	Olly Wilson		Rangitata	—	—		
6	Donna Pokere-Phillips		Hamilton West	—	—		
7	Doug Hill		Christchurch Central	—	—		
8	Piri-Hira Tukapua		Ōtaki	—	—		
9	Nicola Glenjarman		Waimakiriri	—	—		
10	Mika Haka		Auckland Central	—	—		
11	Nicky Snoyink		Selwyn	—	—		
12	Richard Warwick		Hutt South	—	—		
13	Ted Faleauto Johnston		Manukau East	—	—		
14	Abe Gray		Dunedin North	(ALCP: 2)	−12		
15	Clint Ulyatt		Mount Roskill	—	—		
16	Dan Thurston		Mount Albert	—	—		
17	Lesley Immink		East Coast	—	—		
18	Vanessa Lee			—	—		
19	Paddy Plunket		Rongotai	—	—		
20	Brittany Owens		Rodney	—	—		
21	Matt Isbister		North Shore	—	—		
22	David Hay			—	—		
23	Jenny Condie			—	—		
24	Jessica Hammond Doube		Ōhāriu	—	—		
25	Kevin Neill		Waitaki	—	—		
26	Lindsay Smith		Dunedin South	—	—		

=== Outdoors Party ===
The New Zealand Outdoors Party's list was released on 31 August 2017.

Rank	Name	Incumbency	Contesting electorate	Previous rank	Change	Initial results	Later changes
1	Alan Simmons		Taupō	(United Future: 2)	+1		
2	David Haynes		Nelson	—	—		
3	Derrick Paull		Maungakiekie	—	—		
4	Wilf Bearman-Riedel		Hutt South	—	—		

=== New Zealand People's Party ===
The New Zealand People's Party lodged the following party list with the Electoral Commission.

Rank	Name	Incumbency	Contesting electorate	Previous rank	Change	Initial results	Later changes
1	Roshan Nauhria			—	—		
2	Steven Ching			—	—		
3	Anil Sharma			—	—		
4	Lily Yao			—	—		
5	Joann Wu			—	—		
6	Sree Nampally			—	—		
