= New Lynn (New Zealand electorate) =

- Single-member general constituency for the New Zealand House of Representatives
- Formation: 1963, 2002
- Region: Auckland
- Character: Suburban
- Term: 3 years

Member for New Lynn

New Lynn was a New Zealand parliamentary electorate, returning one member to the New Zealand House of Representatives. The current MP for New Lynn is Paulo Garcia of the National Party. He has held the seat since 2023. The electorate was abolished ahead of the 2026 general election.

== Population centres ==
New Lynn electorate boundaries used in the 2014 and 2017 elections

New Lynn is based in West Auckland, straddling the borders of the former Auckland City and areas of Waitakere City. It contains the areas of New Lynn, Titirangi and Waitākere Ranges to cover all the beach-side towns on the north coast of the Manukau Harbour and then up the West Coast till Bethell's Beach.

== History ==
New Lynn was first formed for the 1963 election. It has always been held by members of the Labour Party. The electorate's first representative was Rex Mason, who had been an MP since 1926 and who retired at the end of the term. Mason was succeeded by Jonathan Hunt, who held the electorate for the next 30 years until he contested the Tamaki electorate in the 1996 election instead. Phil Goff became the representative in New Lynn in 1996.

The electorate was abolished in 1999 and Goff successfully stood in Mount Roskill. Titirangi replaced New Lynn in 1999 when population changes in Auckland lead to the creation of Mount Roskill, and Titirangi was won by David Cunliffe. Three years later, population growth in north Auckland led to the creation of the Helensville electorate. The flow-on effect of this was to pull Titirangi eastwards, resulting in the reclamation of its former name for the 2002 election. Cunliffe represented the New Lynn electorate until 2017.

In November 2016, Labour leader Andrew Little announced that Cunliffe would not seek re-election at the 2017 general election, and the seat was won in the election by Deborah Russell, retaining it for the Labour Party. She was defeated by National candidate Paulo Garcia in the 2023 general election.

The 2025 boundary review saw the reconfiguration of electorates in West Auckland resulting in the disestablishment of Te Atatū, Kelston and New Lynn. Most of the population of New Lynn has been redistributed to the new electorate of Waitakere, with some communities being redistributed into Glendene or Mt Roskill.

=== Members of Parliament ===
Unless otherwise stated, all MPs' terms began and ended at general elections.

Key

Labour National

Election	Winner
1963 election	Rex Mason
1966 election	Jonathan Hunt
1969 election	Jonathan Hunt
1972 election	Jonathan Hunt
1975 election	Jonathan Hunt
1978 election	Jonathan Hunt
1981 election	Jonathan Hunt
1984 election	Jonathan Hunt
1987 election	Jonathan Hunt
1990 election	Jonathan Hunt
1993 election	Jonathan Hunt
1996 election	Phil Goff
(Electorate abolished 1999–2002; see Titirangi)
2002 election	David Cunliffe
2005 election	David Cunliffe
2008 election	David Cunliffe
2011 election	David Cunliffe
2014 election	David Cunliffe
2017 election	Deborah Russell
2020 election	Deborah Russell
2023 election	Paulo Garcia
(Electorate abolished in 2026; see Waitākere)

=== List MPs ===
Members of Parliament elected from party lists in elections where that person also unsuccessfully contested New Lynn. Unless otherwise stated, all MPs terms began and ended at general elections.

Election	Winner
2008 election	Tim Groser (Note: Groser resigned from Parliament on 19 December 2015.)
2011 election	Tim Groser
2014 election	Tim Groser
2019	Paulo Garcia (Note: Garcia was declared elected as a list MP on 16 May 2019, following the resignation of Nuk Korako.)
2023 election	Steve Abel
2023 election	Deborah Russell

== Election results ==
=== 2023 election ===
2023 general election: New Lynn
Notes:	Blue background denotes the winner of the electorate vote. Pink background denotes a candidate elected from their party list. Yellow background denotes an electorate win by a list member, or other incumbent. A ✓ or ✗ denotes status of any incumbent, win or lose respectively.						
Party	Candidate	Votes	%	±%	Party votes	%	±%
National	Paulo Garcia	15,886	39.22	+14.25	15,287	37.11	+15.23
Labour	✗ Deborah Russell	14,873	36.72	−20.34	11,020	26.75	−26.58
Green	Steve Abel	5,376	13.27	+4.23	6,859	16.65	+5.20
ACT	Juan Alvarez De Lugo	2,301	5.68	+2.14	3,183	7.73	+1.42
NZ Loyal	Steve Oliver	1,148	2.83	—	454	1.10	—
Independent	Phineas Mann	216	0.53	—			
NZ First					2,020	4.90	+2.57
Opportunities					903	2.19	+0.89
Te Pāti Māori					502	1.22	+0.76
NewZeal					221	0.54	—
Legalise Cannabis					152	0.37	+0.12
Freedoms NZ					104	0.25	—
DemocracyNZ					72	0.17	—
Animal Justice					69	0.17	—
New Conservatives					60	0.15	−1.01
Women's Rights					40	0.10	—
New Nation					15	0.04	—
Leighton Baker Party					7	0.02	—
Informal votes		707			230		
Total valid votes		40,507			41,198		
National gain from Labour	Majority	1,013	2.50				

=== 2020 election ===
2020 general election: New Lynn
Notes:	Blue background denotes the winner of the electorate vote. Pink background denotes a candidate elected from their party list. Yellow background denotes an electorate win by a list member, or other incumbent. A ✓ or ✗ denotes status of any incumbent, win or lose respectively.						
Party	Candidate	Votes	%	±%	Party votes	%	±%
Labour	Deborah Russell	23,352	57.06	+10.15	22,339	53.33	+10.65
National	Lisa Whyte	10,218	24.97	−13.58	9,166	21.88	−19.91
Green	Steve Abel	3,701	9.04	+2.49	4,794	11.45	+5.26
ACT	Shawn Michael Blanchfield	1,447	3.54	+2.77	2,643	6.31	+5.88
NZ First	Rob Gore	651	1.59	−3.47	976	2.33	−3.77
New Conservative	Victoria O'Brien	582	1.42	+0.54	487	1.16	+0.85
TEA	Smitaben Patel	169	0.41	—	81	0.19	—
ONE	Khurram Shahid Malik	121	0.30	—	82	0.20	—
Social Credit	Lisa Er	118	0.29	+0.05	27	0.06	−0.01
Voice of the People	Paul Davie	87	0.21	—			
Opportunities					546	1.30	−0.18
Māori Party					191	0.46	+0.11
Legalise Cannabis					103	0.25	+0.06
Outdoors					36	0.09	+0.06
Sustainable NZ					30	0.07	—
Vision NZ					16	0.04	—
Heartland					2	0.00	—
Informal votes		831			253		
Total valid votes		40,927			41,887		
Labour hold	Majority	13,134	32.09	+23.72			

=== 2017 election ===
2017 general election: New Lynn
Notes:	Blue background denotes the winner of the electorate vote. Pink background denotes a candidate elected from their party list. Yellow background denotes an electorate win by a list member, or other incumbent. A ✓ or ✗ denotes status of any incumbent, win or lose respectively.						
Party	Candidate	Votes	%	±%	Party votes	%	±%
Labour	Deborah Russell	15,840	46.91	−3.17	14,810	42.68	+6.78
National	Paulo Garcia	13,015	38.55	+2.27	14,503	41.79	+2.78
Green	Leilani Tamu	2,210	6.55	−1.26	2,147	6.19	−3.81
NZ First	Peter Chan	1,709	5.06	—	2,116	6.10	−1.04
Conservative	Paul Davie	297	0.88	−2.96	109	0.31	−3.35
Māori Party	Karen Williams	291	0.86	—	122	0.35	±0.00
ACT	Richard Wells	259	0.77	—	149	0.43	−1.18
Democrats	Scott MacArthur	82	0.24	−0.15	23	0.07	−0.03
United Future	John Hubscher	62	0.18	—	30	0.09	−0.08
Opportunities					514	1.48	—
People's Party					80	0.23	—
Legalise Cannabis					66	0.19	−0.11
Mana Party					12	0.03	−1.06 (Note: 2017 Mana Party swing is relative to the votes for Internet-Mana in 2014; it shared a party list with the Internet Party in the 2014 election)
Outdoors					9	0.03	—
Internet					7	0.02	−1.07 (Note: 2017 Internet Party swing is relative to the votes for Internet-Mana in 2014; it shared a party list with Mana Party in the 2014 election)
Ban 1080					5	0.01	−0.04
Informal votes		478			142		
Total valid votes		33,765			34,702		
Turnout		34,844					
Labour hold	Majority	2,825	8.37	−5.43			

=== 2014 election ===
2014 general election: New Lynn
Notes:	Blue background denotes the winner of the electorate vote. Pink background denotes a candidate elected from their party list. Yellow background denotes an electorate win by a list member, or other incumbent. A ✓ or ✗ denotes status of any incumbent, win or lose respectively.						
Party	Candidate	Votes	%	±%	Party votes	%	±%
Labour	✓ David Cunliffe	16,534	50.08	−2.04	12,085	35.90	−1.10
National	Tim Groser	11,977	36.28	+0.06	13,136	39.02	−0.20
Green	Daniel Rogers	2,579	7.81	+0.56	3,365	10.00	−2.15
Conservative	Steve Taylor	1,269	3.84	+1.32	1,233	3.66	+1.07
Democrats	Andrew Leitch	128	0.39	+0.39	33	0.10	+0.07
NZ First					2,403	7.14	+0.96
ACT					542	1.61	+0.62
Internet Mana					367	1.09	+0.64 (Note: 2014 Internet Mana swing is relative to the votes for Mana in 2011; it shared a party list with Internet in the 2014 election.)
Māori Party					119	0.35	−0.09
Legalise Cannabis					101	0.30	−0.14
United Future					56	0.17	−0.21
Civilian					17	0.05	+0.05
Ban 1080					16	0.05	+0.05
Independent Coalition					8	0.02	+0.02
Focus					3	0.01	+0.01
Informal votes		530			177		
Total valid votes		33,017			33,661		
Turnout		33,661	74.92	+1.91			
Labour hold	Majority	4,557	13.80	−2.12			

=== 2011 election ===
2011 general election: New Lynn
Notes:	Blue background denotes the winner of the electorate vote. Pink background denotes a candidate elected from their party list. Yellow background denotes an electorate win by a list member, or other incumbent. A ✓ or ✗ denotes status of any incumbent, win or lose respectively.						
Party	Candidate	Votes	%	±%	Party votes	%	±%
Labour	✓ David Cunliffe	16,999	52.14	+1.80	12,462	37.00	−3.27
National	Tim Groser	11,809	36.22	−2.43	13,211	39.22	−0.88
Green	Saffron Toms	2,364	7.25	+0.86	4,094	12.15	+4.52
Conservative	Ivan Bailey	820	2.52	+2.52	871	2.59	+2.59
Legalise Cannabis	Sean Davidson	343	1.05	+1.05	149	0.44	+0.10
ACT	Barbara Steinijans	265	0.81	−2.12	334	0.99	−2.72
NZ First					2,081	6.18	+2.62
Mana					151	0.45	+0.45
Māori Party					148	0.44	−0.26
United Future					129	0.38	−0.46
Libertarianz					29	0.09	+0.05
Alliance					16	0.05	−0.02
Democrats					10	0.03	+0.01
Informal votes		844			295		
Total valid votes		32,600			33,685		
Labour hold	Majority	5,190	15.92	+4.23			

Electorate (as at 26 November 2011): 46,139

=== 2008 election ===
2008 general election: New Lynn
Notes:	Blue background denotes the winner of the electorate vote. Pink background denotes a candidate elected from their party list. Yellow background denotes an electorate win by a list member, or other incumbent. A ✓ or ✗ denotes status of any incumbent, win or lose respectively.						
Party	Candidate	Votes	%	±%	Party votes	%	±%
Labour	✓ David Cunliffe	17,331	50.35		14,165	40.27	
National	Tim Groser	13,306	38.66		14,105	40.09	
Green	Kath Dewar	2,200	6.39		2,684	7.63	
ACT	Michael Tasker	1,011	2.94		1,306	3.71	
United Future	Kerryanne Dalgleish	330	0.96		296	0.84	
Progressive	Mohammad Kazemi Yazdi	244	0.71		318	0.90	
NZ First					1,253	3.56	
Māori Party					246	0.70	
Pacific					226	0.64	
Bill and Ben					154	0.44	
Kiwi					146	0.42	
Legalise Cannabis					121	0.34	
Family Party					91	0.26	
Alliance					23	0.07	
Libertarianz					14	0.04	
Workers Party					13	0.04	
RAM					8	0.02	
Democrats					7	0.02	
RONZ					3	0.01	
Informal votes		451			203		
Total valid votes		34,422			35,179		
Labour hold	Majority	4,025	11.69				

=== 2005 election ===
2005 general election: New Lynn
Notes:	Blue background denotes the winner of the electorate vote. Pink background denotes a candidate elected from their party list. Yellow background denotes an electorate win by a list member, or other incumbent. A ✓ or ✗ denotes status of any incumbent, win or lose respectively.						
Party	Candidate	Votes	%	±%	Party votes	%	±%
Labour	✓ David Cunliffe	18,087	56.12		16,208	49.19	
National	Mita Harris	10,009	31.05		10,916	33.06	
Green	Richard Green	1,644	5.10		1,850	5.60	
United Future	Anne Drake	943	2.93		818	2.48	
ACT	Barbara Steinijans	701	2.07		747	2.26	
Destiny	Karen Penney	468	1.45		158	0.58	
Progressive	Mohammad Kazemi Yazdi	282	0.87		407	1.23	
Direct Democracy	Gary Burch	98	0.30		98	0.12	
NZ First					1,580	4.79	
Māori Party					128	0.39	
Christian Heritage					56	0.17	
Legalise Cannabis					41	0.15	
Alliance					21	0.06	
Libertarianz					11	0.03	
99 MP					7	0.02	
One NZ					7	0.02	
Family Rights					7	0.02	
Democrats					5	0.02	
RONZ					4	0.01	
Informal votes		549			183		
Total valid votes		33,232			33,019		
Labour hold	Majority	8,078					

=== 2002 election ===
2002 general election: New Lynn
Notes:	Blue background denotes the winner of the electorate vote. Pink background denotes a candidate elected from their party list. Yellow background denotes an electorate win by a list member, or other incumbent. A ✓ or ✗ denotes status of any incumbent, win or lose respectively.						
Party	Candidate	Votes	%	±%	Party votes	%	±%
Labour	David Cunliffe	16,687	57.62		14,128	48.29	
National	Brendan Beach	5,502	19.00		4,315	14.75	
Green	Saffron Toms	1,713	5.92		2,087	7.13	
ACT	Trevor West	1,494	5.16		1,929	2.26	
United Future	Susanne Fellner	1,471	5.08		2,109	7.21	
Christian Heritage	Betty Jenkins	635	2.19		440	1.50	
Alliance	Gerard Hehir	470	2.19		405	1.38	
Progressive	Mohammad Kazemi Yazdi	396	1.37		485	1.66	
NZ First					2,949	10.08	
ORNZ					175	0.60	
Legalise Cannabis					91	0.31	
One NZ					11	0.04	
NMP					6	0.02	
Mana Māori					5	0.02	
Informal votes		590			119		
Total valid votes		28,958			29,254		
Labour win new seat	Majority	11,185					

=== 1996 election ===
1996 general election: New Lynn
Notes:	Blue background denotes the winner of the electorate vote. Pink background denotes a candidate elected from their party list. Yellow background denotes an electorate win by a list member, or other incumbent. A ✓ or ✗ denotes status of any incumbent, win or lose respectively.						
Party	Candidate	Votes	%	±%	Party votes	%	±%
Labour	✓ Phil Goff	15,392	50.29		10,953	35.55	
National	Richard Gardner	8,254	26.97		9,266	30.07	
Alliance	Cliff Robinson	3,554	11.61		2,916	9.46	
NZ First	Dawn Mullins	2,616	8.55		3,300	10.71	
Progressive Green	Mark Darin	301	0.98		101	0.33	
McGillicuddy Serious	Richard Foster	203	0.66		73	0.24	
United NZ	John Hubscher	128	0.42		172	0.56	
Advance New Zealand	James Prescott	91	0.30		38	0.12	
Natural Law	Les McGrath	68	0.12		36	0.12	
Christian Coalition					1,674	5.43	
ACT					1,506	4.89	
Legalise Cannabis					423	1.37	
Ethnic Minority Party					232	0.75	
Animals First					52	0.17	
Superannuitants & Youth					26	0.08	
Green Society					18	0.06	
Libertarianz					8	0.03	
Mana Māori					7	0.02	
Asia Pacific United					6	0.02	
Conservatives					5	0.02	
Te Tawharau					0	0.00	
Informal votes		317			112		
Total valid votes		30,607			30,812		
Labour hold	Majority	7,138	23.32				

=== 1993 election ===
1993 general election: New Lynn
Party	Candidate	Votes	%	±%
Labour	Jonathan Hunt	6,974	38.85	−3.09
Alliance	Cliff Robinson	5,376	29.95	
National	Roger Seavill	3,642	20.29	
NZ First	Dawn Mullins	1,474	8.21	
Christian Heritage	Charles Hinds	360	2.00	
McGillicuddy Serious	Metiria Turei	121	0.67	
Majority		1,598	8.90	+2.80
Turnout		17,947	83.95	+4.41
Registered electors		21,378		

=== 1990 election ===
1990 general election: New Lynn
Party	Candidate	Votes	%	±%
Labour	Jonathan Hunt	7,551	41.94	−16.79
National	Martyn Bishop	6,452	35.84	
NewLabour	Maire Leadbeater	1,792	9.95	
Green	Wendy Morgan	1,516	8.42	
Social Credit	Ian Edward Lawson	220	1.22	
Democrats	Patricia Marie Lawn	204	1.13	
McGillicuddy Serious	Allan Martin-Buss	163	0.90	
Independent	Michael John Revell	102	0.56	
Majority		1,099	6.10	−18.23
Turnout		18,000	79.54	−3.11
Registered electors		22,628		

=== 1987 election ===
1987 general election: New Lynn
Party	Candidate	Votes	%	±%
Labour	Jonathan Hunt	10,546	58.73	+0.45
National	Dick Berry	6,177	34.40	
Democrats	Wayne Beddow	1,016	5.65	
NZ Party	Ray Wilson	215	1.19	
Majority		4,369	24.33	−8.27
Turnout		17,954	82.65	−5.01
Registered electors		21,721		

=== 1984 election ===
1984 general election: New Lynn
Party	Candidate	Votes	%	±%
Labour	Jonathan Hunt	11,334	58.28	+7.44
National	Ron Hanson	4,639	23.85	−0.94
NZ Party	Rod Orr	2,403	12.35	
Social Credit	Gilbert James	1,070	5.50	
Majority		6,340	32.60	+6.56
Turnout		19,446	87.66	+1.22
Registered electors		22,182		

=== 1981 election ===
1981 general election: New Lynn
Party	Candidate	Votes	%	±%
Labour	Jonathan Hunt	9,513	50.84	−2.39
National	Ron Hanson	4,639	24.79	
Social Credit	Les Tasker	4,386	23.44	
Independent	John Elliott	94	0.50	
Socialist Unity	Ray Stewart	79	0.42	
Majority		4,874	26.04	+1.61
Turnout		18,711	86.44	+20.97
Registered electors		21,644		

=== 1978 election ===
1978 general election: New Lynn
Party	Candidate	Votes	%	±%
Labour	Jonathan Hunt	9,565	53.23	+8.89
National	Jacky Bridges	5,175	28.80	
Social Credit	Bill Owens	2,949	16.41	
Values	Thomasina Gunn	278	1.54	
Majority		4,390	24.43	+19.52
Turnout		17,967	65.47	−18.05
Registered electors		27,442		

=== 1975 election ===
1975 general election: New Lynn
Party	Candidate	Votes	%	±%
Labour	Jonathan Hunt	8,033	44.34	−14.46
National	Barry O'Connor	7,143	39.42	
Social Credit	Pat Wojcik	1,524	8.41	−1.17
Values	Keith Langton	1,373	7.57	
Socialist Unity	Peter Cross	28	0.15	−0.48
Socialist Action	Jean Elizabeth Higdon	15	0.08	
Majority		890	4.91	−23.99
Turnout		18,116	83.52	−3.62
Registered electors		21,689		

=== 1972 election ===
1972 general election: New Lynn
Party	Candidate	Votes	%	±%
Labour	Jonathan Hunt	8,774	58.80	+3.28
National	Gordon McDermott	4,462	29.90	
Social Credit	Pat Wojcik	1,430	9.58	
New Democratic	O Bree	159	1.06	
Socialist Unity	Peter Cross	95	0.63	
Majority		4,312	28.90	+7.50
Turnout		14,920	87.14	−2.49
Registered electors		17,121		

=== 1969 election ===
1969 general election: New Lynn
Party	Candidate	Votes	%	±%
Labour	Jonathan Hunt	9,338	55.52	+1.76
National	Vic Watson	5,738	34.11	
Social Credit	Norman Roy Monteith	1,568	9.32	−5.51
Independent Labour	Stephen Chan	175	1.04	
Majority		3,600	21.40	−1.90
Turnout		16,819	89.63	+3.31
Registered electors		18,763		

=== 1966 election ===
1966 general election: New Lynn
Party	Candidate	Votes	%	±%
Labour	Jonathan Hunt	8,598	53.76	
National	Kevin Patrick Lynch	4,871	30.45	
Social Credit	Norman Roy Monteith	2,372	14.83	+6.19
Communist	Jock Foulds	152	0.95	−0.15
Majority		3,727	23.30	
Turnout		15,993	86.32	−3.13
Registered electors		18,527		

=== 1963 election ===
1963 general election: New Lynn
Party	Candidate	Votes	%	±%
Labour	Rex Mason	8,272	55.33	
National	Charles Alexander McLeod	5,220	34.91	
Social Credit	Norman Roy Monteith	1,292	8.64	
Communist	Jock Foulds	165	1.10	
Majority		3,052	20.41	
Turnout		14,949	89.45	
Registered electors		16,711		

== Bibliography ==
- Wilson, Jim (1985) [First ed. published 1913]. New Zealand Parliamentary Record, 1840–1984 (4th ed.). Wellington: V.R. Ward, Govt. Printer. OCLC 154283103.
- Norton, Clifford (1988). New Zealand Parliamentary Election Results 1946–1987: Occasional Publications No 1, Department of Political Science. Wellington: Victoria University of Wellington. ISBN 0-475-11200-8.
