= Riana Manuel =

New Zealand healthcare manager

Riana Manuel (born 1972/1973) is a New Zealand nurse, healthcare manager and chief executive of the Māori Health Authority which came into being in July 2022 and was disestablished in 2024.

Manuel is of Ngāti Pukenga, Ngāti Maru and Ngāti Kahungunu descent. She grew up in Manaia, Coromandel the daughter of a nurse and an ambulance driver; her brother is a doctor. Her mother set up a rest home and small hospital in Coromandel. As a teenager she went to a Māori boarding school where only the Māori language was spoken (known as full immersion).

Manuel is a registered nurse and has based her career in community and Māori healthcare. She was nurse director at Waikato District Health Board and chief executive officer of Hauraki Primary Health Organisation and Te Korowai Hauora o Hauraki, a rural iwi based health provider in the Hauraki area. While Te Korowai services have a Māori focus only about half of its patients were Māori, and its approach achieved better outcomes for all patients.

In December 2021 she was appointed chief executive of the interim Māori Health Authority. Her aim was to ensure that people in both rural and urban areas have services appropriate to their communities, rather than applying a universal approach to healthcare. The Authority was disestablished by the government in 2024.
