= Te Aka Whai Ora =

New Zealand government entity

Te Aka Whai Ora Māori Health Authority
- Formation: 1 July 2022
- Dissolved: 30 June 2024
- Website: https://www.teakawhaiora.nz/

Te Aka Whai Ora (English: Māori Health Authority (MHA)) was an independent New Zealand government statutory entity tasked with managing Māori health policies, services, and outcomes. The agency was one of four national bodies that oversaw New Zealand's health system since 2022, along with the Ministry of Health, the Public Health Agency, and Te Whatu Ora. They replaced a system in which a single Ministry funded services through 20 district health boards (DHBs).

Riana Manuel was appointed to be the first Chief Executive, which has been a permanent agency since 1 July 2022.

In late November 2023, the incoming National-led coalition government announced plans to abolish Te Aka Whai Ora and return to a single integrated health system. The Government's plans to abolish the agency drew criticism from health professionals and Māori leaders. In mid December 2023, Lady Tureiti Moxon and Janice Kuka filed a claim with the Waitangi Tribunal challenging the Government's dissolution plans. In late February 2024, the Government passed urgent legislation disestablishing the Māori Health Authority by 30 June 2024.

== Mandate and responsibilities ==
Te Aka Whai Ora (the Māori Health Authority) is a statutory entity responsible for ensuring that the New Zealand health system meets the needs of Māori. It will work in partnership with the Ministry of Health and Health New Zealand to achieve the following stated goals:

1. leading change in the way the entire health system understands and responds to Māori health needs
2. developing strategy and policy which will improve Māori health outcomes
3. commissioning Māori customary services and other services targeting Māori communities
4. co-commissioning other services alongside Health New Zealand
5. monitoring the overall performance of the system to reduce Māori health inequities.

The MHA worked alongside Health New Zealand to create and develop kaupapa Māori services and policies.

== History ==
=== Policy announcement ===
On 21 April 2021, Minister of Health Andrew Little announced plans to create the Māori Health Authority, which would be responsible for setting Māori health policies and overseeing the provision of Māori health services. In addition, Little announced that the government would create two other public health bodies: Health New Zealand, to replace the country's district health boards, and the Public Health Authority, to centralise public health work.

The proposed Māori Health Authority was criticised by the opposition National Party health spokesperson Shane Reti, who claimed that it would create a "two-tier system" based on race. Similar sentiments were echoed by National Party leader Judith Collins, who likened it to racial segregation and called for public consultation on the matter. Her remarks were described by Māori Party co-leader Debbie Ngarewa-Packer as "desperate racist politicking." Ngarewa-Packer also urged Collins to read National's own 2020 election review which advocated making Māori a "priority area". In addition, Associate Health Minister Ayesha Verrall stated that the proposed Māori Health Authority could ensure Māori input in funding and improving Māori health outcomes.

=== Formation ===
In mid September 2021, the government announced the interim board members of the Māori Health Authority. The organisation was headed by co-chairs Sharon Shea (chair of the Bay of Plenty District Health Board) and Tipa Mahuta (Deputy Chair of the Counties Manukau District Health Board). Other board members consisted of medical specialist and University of Otago Professor Dr Sue Crengle, Dr Mataroria Lyndon, Lady Tureiti Moxon, Fiona Pimm, Awerangi Tamihere, and Dr Chris Tooley (Chief Executive of Te Puna Ora o Mataatua).

On 15 March 2022, the New Zealand Government allocated NZ$22 million from the 2021 New Zealand budget to the commissioning of the interim Māori Health Authority.

On 19 May 2022, the government allocated a record sum of $13.2 billion from the 2022 New Zealand budget to facilitate the establishment of both the MHA and Health NZ over the next four years; with $11.1 billion being allocated to cover cost pressures from the previous DHB system and $2.1 billion to setting up the two new public health entities. In addition, the government allocated $188 million for the Māori Health Authority to commission services and develop partnerships with iwi (Māori tribes).

In October 2021, the government introduced the Pae Ora (Healthy Futures) Bill to formally entrench its proposed health reforms. These reforms included formally establishing the Māori Health Authority as a new Crown entity. The bill passed its third reading on 7 June 2022.

On 1 July 2022, the MHA formally came into existence as a new entity. The MHA's interim chief executive Riana Manuel stated that the new organisation would work alongside Health NZ. While it would have its own commissioning powers and work with Māori health providers, Manuel clarified that the MHA would also have oversight over the entire health system to ensure equity for Māori. Māori health practitioners Danny De Lore and Reweti Ropiha expressed hope that the new entity would improve Māori health outcomes and combat inequity within the health system.

In March 2023, a review of Te Aka Whai Ora identified several issues facing the organisation including recruitment, an underspent budget, and planning issues.

=== Dissolution ===
On 24 November 2023, the incoming National-led coalition government pledged to disestablish Te Aka Whai Ora in its coalition agreement. During campaigning leading up to the 2023 New Zealand general election, the National Party had campaigned on replacing it with a Māori directorate within the Ministry of Health. The allied ACT Party leader David Seymour had also earlier denounced the MHA as an example of racial discrimination and argued that services ought to be provided based on need rather than ethnicity. Similarly, the allied New Zealand First leader Winston Peters had advocated abolishing Te Aka Whai Ora in order to eliminate "separatism." The Health Minister Shane Reti also confirmed that the Government would disestablish the MHA and return to a single integrated health system. To dissolve the agency, Cabinet must first approve of the dissolution and Parliament has to repeal Section 17 of the Pae Ora (Health Futures) Act 2022.

The National-led government's plans to abolish Te Aka Whai Ora was criticised by several health professionals and advocates including anti-smoking advocate Teresa Butler, University of Otago Māori health professor Sue Crengle, Health Coalition New Zealand board member Grant Berghan, and the Royal Australasian College of Physicians's (RACP) President Dr Stephen Inns. They argued that abolishing the organisation would have an adverse impact on Māori health outcomes. In addition, the New Zealand Medical Students' Association submitted a letter criticising the proposed dissolution and urging Prime Minister Christopher Luxon, Reti, and Māori-Crown Relations Minister Tama Potaka "to demonstrate their commitment to Māori health leadership."

On 14 December 2023, Lady Tureiti Moxon and Janice Kuka filed a claim at the Waitangi Tribunal, challenging the Government's plans to dissolve Te Aka Whai Ora. They claimed that the Government's plans to dissolve the agency constituted a breach of the Treaty of Waitangi. On 18 December, the Government filed a memorandum of counsel opposing Moxon and Kuka's claim. The Government conceded that it had no alternative plan to address poor Māori health outcomes and that it had not consulted Māori according to the principles of the Treaty. The Government also conceded its plans to dissolve Te Aka Whai Ora had been motivated by political expediency during the 2023 election campaign.

On 15 December, Waatea News reported that Te Aka Whai Ora's chief executive Riana Manuel had met several times with Health Minister Reti and Associate Health Minister Matt Doocey. While Reti confirmed that the Government would proceed with its plans to dissolve the organisation, he reaffirmed the Government's commitment to continue working with iwi-Māori partnership boards on the health needs of the Māori community including mental health.

In early February, 700 doctors signed a letter petitioning the Heath Minister Reti protesting the Government's plans to dissolve Te Aka Whai Ora and seeking information on how the Government planned to prioritise Māori health outcomes.

Urgent legislation to disestablish Te Aka Whai Ora by 30 June 2024 was introduced into Parliament by Dr Reti on 27 February and passed on 28 February 2024. The governing National, ACT and NZ First parties supported its disestablishment while the opposition Labour, Green parties and Te Pāti Māori opposed it. Its functions and staff will be absorbed into the Ministry of Health and Te Whatu Ora.

The Government's disestablishment of Te Aka Whai Ora was criticised by several individuals and groups including University of Waikato academic and general practitioner Dr Rawiri Keenan, Māori health advocacy group Hāpaii Te Hauora, the Iwi Chairs Forum and former Te Whatu Ora chair Rob Campbell. Lady Moxon described the Government's decision to pass legislation dissolving the Māori Health Authority prior to the scheduled Waitangi Tribunal hearing on 29 February as disrespectful. In response, Prime Minister Christopher Luxon and Dr Reti said that the agency's dissolution was part of the National-led government's 100-day plan. Luxon stated "we’ve campaigned on it. The New Zealand people supported it."

On 15 May, several Māori health providers including Te Puna Ora o Mataatua, the Ngāti Hine Health Trust, Te Kohao Health and Papakura Marae challenged the Government's decision to abolish Te Aka Whai Ora in the High Court, alleging breaches of the Treaty of Waitangi and the New Zealand Bill of Rights Act 1990.

On 1 July 2024, several former Te Aka Whai Ora board members and senior executives including chair Tipa Mahuta and founding chief executive Riana Manuel gathered for a farewell ceremony at Waitangi to bid the independent Crown entity farewell. The ceremony was also attended by former associate health minister Peeni Henare. The organisation's responsibility for managing Māori health outcomes was reassigned to iwi partnership boards. Many former Te Aka Whai Ora staff returned to the community health sector.
