= Tureiti Moxon =

Māori Health Leader

Tureiti, Lady Moxon
- Born: Tureiti Haromi Hawkins; 1957 (age 68–69); Wairoa, New Zealand
- Occupation: Māori health leader
- Political party: Māori Party
- Spouse: David Moxon
- Children: 4

Tureiti Haromi Moxon, Lady Moxon (née Hawkins; born 1957) is a New Zealand Māori health leader and campaigner.

== Early life and education ==
Moxon was born in Wairoa, Hawkes Bay, in 1957, the daughter of Te Muera and Margaret Hawkins. Her iwi are Ngāti Pāhauwera, Ngāti Kahungunu and Kāi Tahu. She grew up on a farm in Mōhaka as one of 12 children, and described her family as "very Anglican". At age 12 she received a scholarship from the Māori Education Foundation to attend Hukarere Girls' College. When she left school she joined a song and dance troupe of 60 young people in India. She then trained in early childhood education and later in law at Waikato University. She worked as a lawyer in the area of Treaty of Waitangi claims and settlements.

== Professional career ==
Since 2002, Moxon has been the managing director of primary health provider Te Kōhao Health, a health, education, social and justice service provider in Hamilton servicing the wider Waikato region. She has grown it from 1,500 enrolled individual members to 8,400, and a staff of 234.

In September 2021, the interim Māori Health Authority was formed with Moxon as a board member.

Moxon is currently the managing director of Te Kōhao Health in Hamilton, chair of the National Urban Māori Authority (NUMA), and is a Chartered Fellow with the Institute of Directors.

In 2020, Moxon received the Te Tupu-ā-Rangi Award for Health and Science, for her dedication to improving the physical and mental wellbeing of New Zealanders at the Ngā Whetū o Matariki – Matariki Awards. Moxon was awarded an Honorary Doctorate by the University of Waikato in 2024 for her contribution to health particularly righting inequities and systemic bias in healthcare.

== Community involvement and leadership ==
In 2005, she and others applied to the Waitangi Tribunal, challenging inequities suffered by Māori in the public health system and seeking access to health data. In 2019, in response to the claim, a Waitangi Tribunal report said the Crown was to set up a stand-alone Māori health agency, and consider compensation for failing to improve Māori health over the past 20 years. By failing to set up and run the primary health system in a way that reduced the gap between Maori and non-Maori health outcomes.

In 2012, Moxon was part of the Ngāti Pāhauwera negotiating team who settled their historical treaty claims with the Crown. She is a claimant in a number of claims before the Waitangi Tribunal in relation to health, Oranga Tamariki and ACC.

In 2021, Moxon called for the elimination of state care of children (tamariki) for not upholding Māori self-determination (tino rangatiratanga) over their families (whānau). She has said the Crown should consider compensating families who have been punished and traumatised by state intervention. Instead she called for Māori structures to provide the support to families where needed. In her capacity as NUMA chair she also said, "Given that 60 to 70 per cent of children in State care are Māori, National Urban Māori Authority continues to advocate that 60 to 70 per cent of the resources should go to Māori.

In November 2022, an independent panel was appointed by the Police Commissioner Andrew Coster, to investigate racism in the New Zealand Police, with Moxon as one of the panel members.

== Politics ==
Moxon stood as the Māori Party candidate for the Hamilton West electorate at the 2005 general election, gaining 379 votes to finish fifth in a 10-candidate race. At that election, she was ranked 25th on the Māori Party list, and was consequently not elected.

In 2009, Moxon was the Māori Party electorate co-chair for the Tainui electorate.

In the 2013 local-body elections, Moxon stood as an independent candidate for the Hamilton City Council for one of six seats representing the West Ward. Out of 23 candidates she finished 12th, with 3081 votes.

In the 2020 general election, Moxon was a list candidate for the Māori Party, with a ranking of 11. With the Māori Party winning 1.2% of the vote, she was not elected to Parliament.

During the 2023 New Zealand general election, Moxon was a list candidate for Te Pāti Māori and was ranked 20th place on the party list. Due to her low ranking, she was not elected into Parliament.

In December 2023, Moxon and Janice Kuka filed a claim with the Waitangi Tribunal challenging the Sixth National Government's plans to dissolve Te Aka Whai Ora (Māori Health Authority), claiming it constituted a breach of the Treaty of Waitangi.

In late November 2025, Moxon submitted a complaint against New Zealand to the United Nations' Committee on the Elimination of Racial Discrimination (CERD). She criticised the New Zealand government for implementing various laws and policies which she alleged discriminated against Māori including the disestablishment of the Māori Health Authority, the removal of targeted bowel cancer screening, the repeal of anti-smoking legislation, a review of references to the Treaty of Waitangi in legislation, boot camps for youth offenders, the Fast-track Approvals Act 2024, efforts to disestablish the Māori wards and constituencies and downgrading the Treaty of Waitangi, Māori language and indigenous history in schools and government agencies. In late November 2025, the CERD committee in Geneva heard submissions from both Māori community leaders and representatives of the New Zealand government including Justice Minister Paul Goldsmith, and questioned both sides. In early December 2025, the CERD committee released a report expressing concern that multiple government policies affecting Māori could weaken the implementation of the radical discrimination convention. Moxon praised the report, saying that "CERD is clear: New Zealand is moving backwards on racial equality, and Māori rights are under serious threat."

== Personal life ==
Moxon is married to Anglican bishop Sir David Moxon, formerly the Archbishop of Canterbury's representative to the Holy See and director of the Anglican Centre in Rome. They met when he was a priest in Havelock North, about 1980. They both serve the tikanga Pākehā side of the Anglican Church in Aotearoa, New Zealand and Polynesia. She became Lady Moxon when her husband was knighted in 2014. They have four adult children.
