= Public Health Agency (New Zealand) =

Directorate of the New Zealand government

- Te Pou Hauora Tūmatanui (Māori)

Agency overview
- Formed: 1 July 2022
- Jurisdiction: New Zealand
- Minister responsible: Simeon Brown, Minister of Health
- Agency executive: Andrew Old, Deputy-Director General
- Website: www.health.govt.nz/about-us/organisation-and-leadership/public-health-agency

The Public Health Agency (PHA; Māori: Te Pou Hauora Tūmatanui) is a directorate within the New Zealand Ministry of Health responsible for managing population and public health. It was established on 1 July 2022 as part of a large scale reform of public health services in New Zealand.

== Leadership ==
The Public Health Agency is led by Andrew Old, who assumed the position of deputy-director general of the organisation on 18 July 2022.

== History ==
In mid–April 2021, Minister of Health Andrew Little announced that New Zealand's district health board system would be replaced with three new entities including the public health agency, Te Whatu Ora (Health New Zealand), the Te Aka Whai Ora (Māori Health Authority), and the Public Health Authority. The latter would be tasked with centralising the provision of public health services in New Zealand.

In October 2021, the Sixth Labour Government introduced the Pae Ora (Healthy Futures) Bill to entrench the new health system into law. Besides establishing Health NZ and the Māori Health Authority, the legislation also established the Public Health Agency as a directorate of the Health Ministry.

The Public Health Agency formally came into existence on 1 July 2022. It inherited the functions of the former Health Promotion Agency including public health and population health policy, strategy, regulatory, intelligence, surveillance, and monitoring. The new agency will also advise the Director-General of Health on theses issues. In addition, the PHA was tasked with developing a public health strategy to meet the needs of Māori and integrating mātauranga Māori (indigenous Māori knowledge) and tofa loloto (Pasifika knowledge) into evidence-based health policy.

On 19 July, the outgoing Director-General of Health Ashley Bloomfield announced that the PHA's Deputy Director-General Andrew Old would assume responsibility for fronting COVID-19 media briefings and press conferences following his departure later in the month.
