= Leilani Tamu =

New Zealand poet

- Born: Leilani Leafaitulagi Grace Burgoyne; Auckland, New Zealand
- Education: St Mary’s College, University of Auckland
- Relatives: Bill Burgoyne (father)
- Writing career
- Language: English
- Genre: Poetry

Leilani Leafaitulagi Grace Tamu (née Burgoyne) is a New Zealand poet and politician.

== Background ==
Tamu was born Leilani Leafaitulagi Grace Burgoyne in Auckland and is of Samoan, Tongan, Scottish and German descent. She is the daughter of rugby league player Bill Burgoyne and Ellen Oldehaver. She grew up in Auckland and attended Marist School Mt Albert and St Mary's College. She attended the University of Auckland where she studied history. Her master's thesis was on Apia between 1879 and 1900.

Tamu lives in Auckland.

== Career ==
For several years, Tamu worked as a diplomat for the New Zealand Ministry of Foreign Affairs and Trade, including postings to Tonga (2010–2012) and Australia. After leaving the ministry, she became an active writer and social commentator, specifically on Pasifika issues.

=== Published works ===
Tamu published her first collection of poetry, The Art of Excavation in 2014 (Anahera Press). Her second collection, Cultural Diplomacy, was released in 2017, following her residency in Hawai‘i.

With Melani Anae and Lautofa Luli, Tamu documented the history of the Polynesian Panther Party in the book Polynesian Panthers: Pacific Protest and Affirmative Action in Aotearoa NZ 1971–1981 (2015, Huia Publishers).

Tamu is a regular contributor to Metro magazine and has been published in a number of literary journals and anthologies.

Poetry by Tamu was included in UPU, a curation of Pacific Island writers’ work which was first presented at the Silo Theatre as part of the Auckland Arts Festival in March 2020. UPU was remounted as part of the Kia Mau Festival in Wellington in June 2021.

=== Parliamentary candidate ===
Tamu was placed 17th on the Green Party's list to contest the 2017 New Zealand general election, and ran for the New Lynn electorate. She placed third in the electorate, behind Paulo Garcia and was defeated by the Labour Party candidate Deborah Russell. The Green Party did not receive enough party votes to elect her from the party list.

== Awards ==
In 2013 Tamu received Fulbright-Creative New Zealand Pacific Writer's Residency at the University of Hawaiʻi at Mānoa.

Her poetry collection, The Art of Excavation, was praised as a favourite book of 2015 by the New Zealand Book Council.
