= Pae Ora (Healthy Futures) Act 2022 =

Act of Parliament in New Zealand

New Zealand Parliament
- Royal assent: 14 June 2022

Legislative history
- Introduced by: Andrew Little
- First reading: 27 October 2021
- Second reading: 5 May 2022
- Third reading: 7 June 2022
- Passed: 7 June 2022
- Status: Amended

The Pae Ora (Healthy Futures) Act 2022 is a New Zealand act of Parliament that replaces the district health board system with a national public health service called Health New Zealand. It also establishes a separate Māori Health Authority (MHA) and a new Public Health Agency. The bill passed its third reading on 7 June 2022 and became law on 14 June 2022.

== Key provisions ==
The Pae Ora (Healthy Futures) Act 2022 establishes a new structure and new accountability arrangements for New Zealand's publicly-funded health system. Key provisions include:

- Giving the Minister of Health oversight over the New Zealand, Hauora Māori (Māori health), Pacific, disabled, women, and rural health strategies. The Minister is also responsible for endorsing the health plan developed by Health New Zealand and the Māori Health Authority (MHA).
- Establishing Health New Zealand as a Crown agent. The agency is headed by a board and must provide information to iwi (tribal)-Māori partnership boards. Health NZ also assumes responsibility for the functions and assets of the former district health boards and the Health Promotion Agency.
- Establishes the Māori Health Authority as an independent statutory entity. The MHA is required to engage and work with Māori and iwi-Māori partnership boards. It is also headed by a board.
- Defines the purpose and functions of the iwi-Māori partnership boards.
- Requires Health NZ and the MHA to develop a New Zealand Health Plan and Health Charter.
- Provides the regulatory framework for Pharmac, the New Zealand Blood and Organ Service (NZBOS), and the Health Quality and Safety Commission (HQSC).
- Requires the Minister of Health to establish a Hauora Māori Advisory Committee.
- Amends the Health Act 1956 to establish a new Public Health Agency to provide leadership across the public health sector and to advise the Director-General of Health on matters relating to public health.
- Replaces references to the district health boards in other legislation with Health New Zealand and the Māori Health Authority.

== Legislative history ==
The Pae Ora Bill passed its first reading on 27 October 2021 by a margin of 77 votes to 43 votes. The Labour and Green parties supported the Bill's goals of replacing the district health boards with a national health organisation and creating a Māori Health Authority to meet the needs of Māori. The National Party opposed the Bill on the grounds that it would reduce local decision making while the ACT Party expressed concern that the creation of the MHA would divide people based on race rather than their needs. The Bill was referred to the Pae Ora Legislation Committee.

By 9 December 2021, the Pae Ora Legislation Committee had received 4,665 submissions from interested groups and people including 178 oral submissions. The Committee made several amendments to the Bill at the advice of the Department of the Prime Minister and Cabinet, the Office of the Clerk, the Parliamentary Counsel Office, and the Regulations Review Committee including the following:

- Replacing references to the "health system" with "health sector.
- Requiring the MHA to work with the Iwi (tribal) Māori Partnership Boards.
- Requiring board members of Health New Zealand and the MHA to have knowledge, experience and expertise with Tikanga Māori (Māori culture and customs) and the Treaty of Waitangi.
- Amending Clause 7 to clarify that health services should be tailored to person's physical and mental needs and circumstances.
- Requiring the health system to take measures to address "wider determinants" such as climate change that affect people's health.
- Requiring Pharmac to engage with Māori and other population groups on health-related issues.
- Clarifying Work New Zealand's role in workforce development and the healthcare sector.
- Emphasizing the MHA's role in delivering health services and working with any agency, organisation, and individual to improve Māori health outcomes.
- Expanding the scope for dispute resolution to include all situations where Health NZ and the MHA are required to work together.

On 5 May 2022, Parliament voted to accept the amendments to the Bill recommended by the Pae Ora Legislation Committee by a margin of 77 to 43 votes. That same day, the Bill passed its second reading by a margin of 77 to 43 votes. While the Labour, Green and Māori parties supported the Bill, it was opposed by the National and ACT parties.

On 7 June 2022, the Bill passed its third and final reading by a margin of 77 to 42 votes. While the Labour, Green and Māori parties supported the Bill, National and ACT opposed it.

== Amendments ==
=== Māori Health Authority disestablishment ===
On 27 February 2024, the National-led coalition government introduced the Pae Ora (Disestablishment of the Māori Health Authority) Amendment Act 2024 to disestablish Te Aka Whai Ora (the Māori Health Authority) by 30 June 2024. Under the Pae Ora Amendment Act 2024, all remaining roles and functions of the Health Authority would be transferred to Te Whatu Ora (Health NZ) and the Health Ministry. The Iwi Māori Partnership Boards and the Hauora Māori Advisory Committee, which were established under the Pae Ora Act 2022, will remain in place. On 28 February, the Pae Ora Amendment Act 2024 passed into law by a margin of 68 to 54 under urgency.

=== Iwi-Māori partnership boards ===
On 14 June 2025, Health Minister Simeon Brown announced that the Government would be introducing legislation to amend the Pae Ora (Health Futures) Act 2022 including establishing a new statutory purpose to ensure that patients have access to "timely" quality care, legislated health targets to improve accountability and management, stronger financial oversight and governance within Health New Zealand, empowering the Director-General of Health to monitor Health NZ, prioritising skills and delivery in the appointment of board members, reducing red tape and audit requirements, enhancing the advisorial role of the Hauora Māori Advisory Committee, and repurposing the iwi-Māori Partnership Boards to focus on community engagement rather than designing and delivering services.

In early December 2025, the health select committee delivered its report on the proposed legislation, which approved of the Government's plans to remove the independent monitoring of Māori health and centralise the functions of Māori health boards. The proposed amendment legislation would also remain the bill "Healthy Future (Pae Ora) Act." The opposition Labour, Green parties and Te Pāti Māori delivered a joint dissenting report arguing that the amendment would disempower the Māori health boards and undermine the New Zealand Crown's partnership with Māori.

== Responses ==
The New Zealand Disability Support Network recommended that the Pae Ora (Health Futures) Bill be amended to include that Health New Zealand Board's members have person experience with disable issues; that Health New Zealand collaborate with the Ministry for Disabled People on disability issues; that the Minister of Health consult with disabled people, their families, carers, and disability representative organisations and providers regarding the development of the Disability Health Strategy; that the Health Quality and Safety Commission (HQSC) consult with disable people, their families, providers, representative organisations, and providers.
