= Nuk Korako =

New Zealand politician

Nuk Korako JP
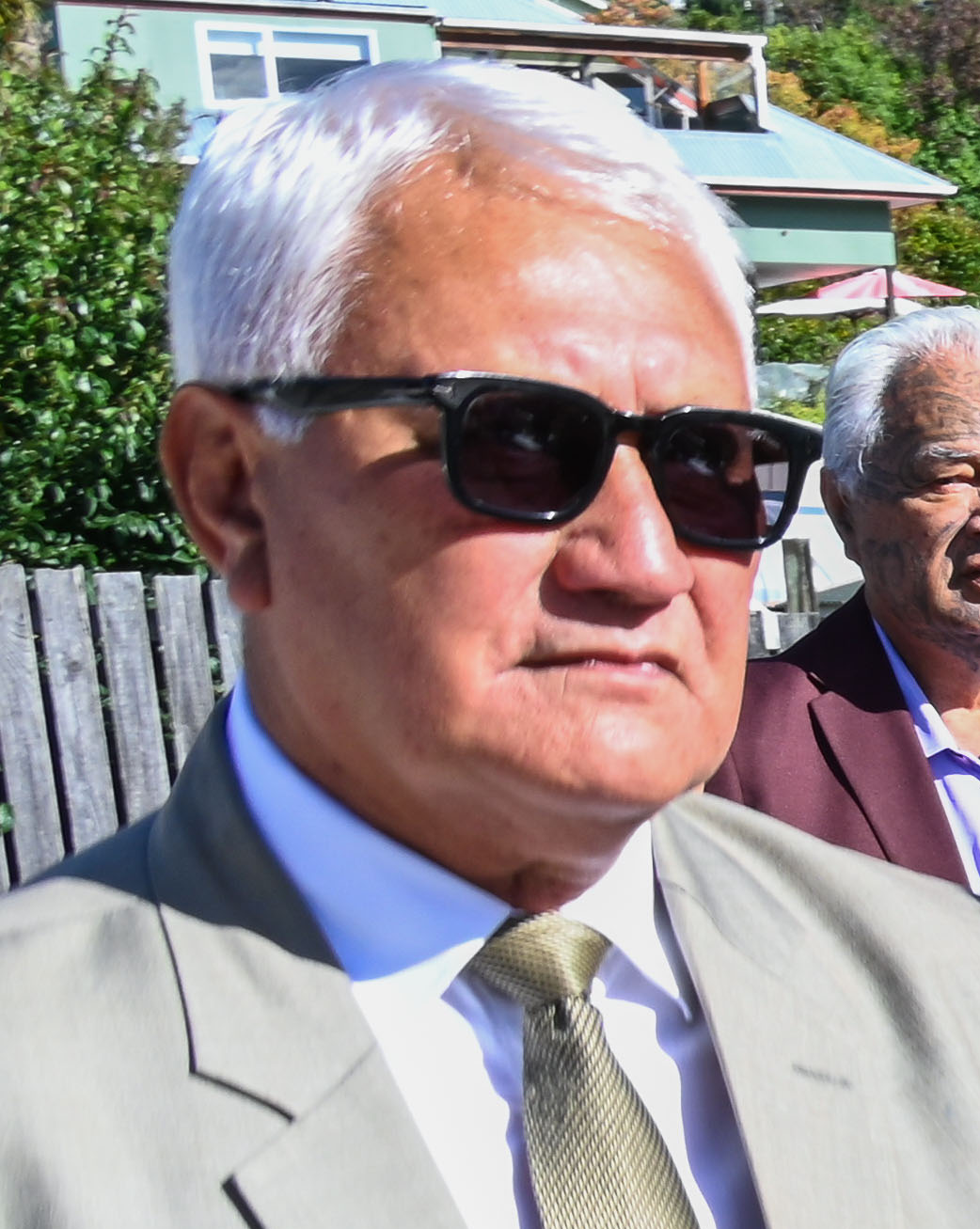
- Korako in 2025

Member of Parliament for National List
- In office 20 September 2014 – 16 May 2019
- Succeeded by: Paulo Garcia

Personal details
- Born: 1954 (age 71–72) Kaiapoi, New Zealand
- Party: National
- Spouse: Christine
- Children: 4

Tutehounuku "Nuk" Korako JP (/nʊk/ NUUK; born 1954) is a New Zealand politician and member of Canterbury Regional Council (Environment Canterbury). He was previously a list Member of Parliament, representing the National Party, from 2014 to 2019.

== Early life and family ==
Korako is of the Ngāi Tahu iwi. His father is from North Canterbury and was a freezing worker; his paternal grandfather was a wharfie. His mother is from Te Rāpaki-o-Te Rakiwhakaputa in Banks Peninsula.

Korako was educated at St Stephen's School in Bombay south of Auckland, Rangiora High School, and Lincoln College. He is married to Christine, and they have four sons.

== Career ==
Korako is a businessman in the tourism sector and a Ngāi Tahu board member.

== Political career ==
New Zealand Parliament
Years	Term	Electorate	List	Party
2014–2017	51st	List	50	National
2017–2019	52nd	List	42	National

Korako supported the National Party for many years, and contributed to Bob Parker's 2007 mayoral campaign.

Korako stood for Christchurch City Council in the 2013 local elections in the Banks Peninsula ward. Based on preliminary results, he was just five votes behind Andrew Turner, with 80 special votes still to be counted. On the strength that he might get declared elected, Korako attended the induction meeting, and joined the council delegation that met Earthquake Recovery Minister Gerry Brownlee. One week after the election, Turner was declared the winner with a five votes margin.

Korako contested Port Hills for National in the 2014 election. He was selected as the National candidate over fellow contenders Lincoln Platt and Jason White, and had been asked to stand by former Banks Peninsula MP and current Speaker of the House David Carter. The electorate was won by the incumbent Ruth Dyson of the Labour Party, but National polled well enough that Korako entered Parliament via the National party list. He chaired the Māori Affairs Committee in his first term.

In 2016, Korako had a private member's bill drawn by ballot for debate in Parliament. The Airport Authorities (Publicising Lost Property Sales) Amendment Bill would allow airports to decide the best way to advertise lost property for sale. The Bill was criticised by Labour, New Zealand First and ACT for being a minor law change that could have been achieved through other legislative means. The Government eventually progressed Korako's sought amendments through a Statutes Amendment Bill, rather than a standalone law change.

Korako was re-elected as a list MP in the 2017 election, having failed to unseat Dyson for a second time. National was in Opposition from the election; Korako served as the party's spokesperson for Māori Affairs and Treaty of Waitangi Negotiations from November 2017 to May 2019, when he retired.

In mid-April 2019, Korako announced his retirement from politics, which took effect on 16 May 2019. He was succeeded by Paulo Garcia.

After the 2022 local elections, Korako was appointed as a Ngāi Tahu representative on Environment Canterbury.

== Political views ==
Korako held generally conservative positions. He voted against cannabis reform and euthanasia reform as a Member of Parliament.
