= Deborah Russell =

New Zealand politician (born 1966)

The Honourable Deborah Russell MP
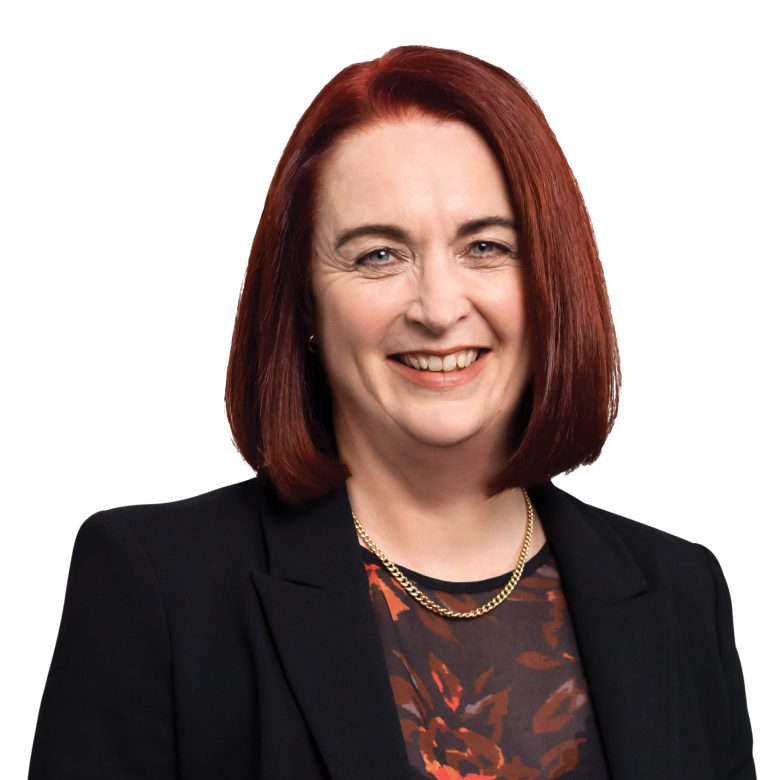
- Russell in 2023

32nd Minister of Statistics
- In office 1 February 2023 – 27 November 2023
- Prime Minister: Chris Hipkins
- Preceded by: David Clark
- Succeeded by: Andrew Bayly

21st Minister Responsible for the Earthquake Commission
- In office 1 February 2023 – 27 November 2023
- Prime Minister: Chris Hipkins
- Preceded by: David Clark

Member of the New Zealand Parliament for New Lynn
- In office 23 September 2017 – 14 October 2023
- Preceded by: David Cunliffe
- Succeeded by: Paulo Garcia

Member of the New Zealand Parliament for Labour Party list
- In office 14 October 2023 – 7 November 2026

Personal details
- Born: 14 January 1966 (age 60) Whangamōmona, New Zealand
- Party: Labour (2011–present); National (1980s)
- Spouse: Malcolm Wright
- Children: 3
- Profession: Academic

Academic background
- Education: Australian National University
- Thesis: Republicanism and multiculturalism (2001)
- Doctoral advisor: Philip Pettit

Academic work
- Discipline: Philosophy

Deborah Faye Russell (born 14 January 1966) is a New Zealand academic and politician. She is a Member of Parliament for the Labour Party and served as Minister of Statistics and Minister Responsible for the Earthquake Commission from February to November 2023.

== Early life and family ==
Russell was born in Whangamōmona, a small town in the Manawatū-Whanganui region, to parents David and Marie Russell. She was raised Catholic and attended Sacred Heart Girls' College in New Plymouth. She is married to academic Malcolm Wright; the couple share three daughters.

== Academic career ==
Russell graduated with a BCom (Hon) in Accounting and Finance from University of Otago in 1987. This was followed by a BA (Hon) in Philosophy in 1996 from Massey University. In 2001 she received her PhD in philosophy from Australian National University.

Russell worked in the private sector as an accountant, and in the public sector as a policy analyst. She has lectured at universities in both Australia and New Zealand in taxation, ethics, business ethics, political theory and philosophy. She was a senior lecturer specialising in taxation at Massey University, a position she held for six years until her 2017 resignation to contest the New Lynn electorate.

She wrote Tax and Fairness with Terry Baucher, which was published by Bridget Williams Books in May 2017 and interrogates whether New Zealand can be seen as an egalitarian country.

== Political career ==
While studying at the University of Otago, Russell was briefly a member of the National Party.

Russell stood in the central North Island electorate of Rangitīkei at the 2014 election, but was defeated by the incumbent, National's Ian McKelvie. Following her election defeat she provided political commentary in the media. The New Zealand Herald reported that Russell impressed the party leadership with her performance as a commentator and received support in her bid to be the Labour candidate for the safer Auckland seat of New Lynn in the 2017 election, despite not having a pre-existing connection to the electorate.

=== Member of Parliament ===
New Zealand Parliament
| Years | Term | Electorate | List | Party |
|---|---|---|---|---|
| 2017–2020 | 52nd | New Lynn | 30 | Labour |
| 2020–2023 | 53rd | New Lynn | 33 | Labour |
| 2023–2026 | 54th | List | 22 | Labour |

=== First term, 2017–2020 ===
In February 2017, after a competitive selection process, Russell was chosen as Labour's 2017 candidate for New Lynn. She replaced former Labour Party leader David Cunliffe, who had, in the previous year, signalled his intention to retire from politics at the next election. Russell promised to change her residence to the electorate if she was selected, and she now lives there. Russell was ranked 30 on Labour's party list, up three places from 2014. She won New Lynn with a margin of 2,825 votes over National's Paulo Garcia, and entered Parliament.

In her first term, Russell was a member of the Environment Committee and the Finance and Expenditure Committee. She chaired the former from November 2017 until July 2019, and the latter from July 2019 until the 2020 election. In 2018, Russell promoted a member's bill (the Companies (Disclosure of Payment Practice and Performance) Amendment Bill) intended to improve transparency around large companies' payment practices. The bill followed advocacy from small business owners and The Spinoff against a change made by Fonterra to move to 60-day payment terms rather than the standard 30-day payment terms. Ultimately Russell chose to withdraw the bill because the government introduced similar legislation that addressed the same problem.

=== Second term, 2020–2023 ===
During the 2020 New Zealand general election, Russell retained the New Lynn electorate by a final margin of 13,134 votes. She wrote a weekly campaign diary chronicling her re-election efforts which was published by Newsroom.

In early November, Russell was appointed as Parliamentary Under-Secretary to the Minister of Revenue. She also chaired the special select committee that was established to scrutinise the Pae Ora (Healthy Futures) Bill. Another member's bill in Russell's name, the Employment Relations (Extended Time for Personal Grievance for Sexual Harassment) Amendment Bill, was drawn from the ballot and introduced to Parliament in October 2021. The bill was eventually transferred into the name of Marja Lubeck (due to Russell's promotion to a ministerial position) and passed unanimously in June 2023. It provides employees with 12 months to raise a personal grievance related to sexual harassment, rather than the previous 90 days.

In a cabinet reshuffle by Prime Minister Chris Hipkins on 31 January 2023 Russell was promoted to be a minister outside Cabinet as the Minister of Statistics and Minister responsible for the Earthquake Commission, succeeding David Clark, and additionally as an associate minister with responsibility in the justice and revenue portfolios. She was responsible for the delivery of the 2023 New Zealand Census. As Associate Minister of Justice, she received and announced the resignation of Meng Foon from his position of race relations commissioner over failures to declare conflicts of interests.

=== Third term, 2023–2026 ===
During the 2023 New Zealand general election, Russell lost the New Lynn electorate to National Party candidate Paulo Garcia by a margin of 1,013 votes. However, she was re-elected to Parliament on the Labour party list.

In late November 2023, Russell was appointed as spokesperson for revenue, science, innovation and technology, and associate spokesperson for education (tertiary) in the Shadow Cabinet of Chris Hipkins. On 5 December 2023, Russell was granted retention of the title The Honourable, in recognition of her term as a member of the Executive Council.

On 16 October 2024, Russell's private member's bill, the Family Proceedings (Dissolution for Family Violence) Amendment Act 2024, passed into law with unanimous parliamentary support. The bill exempts victims of domestic violence from the mandatory two year period needed to seek a divorce under New Zealand law.

On 7 March 2025, Russell retained the revenue portfolio and also gained the climate change and associate finance portfolios during a cabinet reshuffle. She lost the science, innovation and technology, and associate education (tertiary) portfolios.

In mid November 2024, Russell's member's bill, the Companies (Address Information) Amendment Act 2025, passed into law with cross-party support. It allows company directors to remove their home addresses from the companies' register to prevent harassment and stalking.

During the 2026 New Zealand general election, Russell was ranked 27th on the Labour Party list. Based on preliminary results, Russell was not re-elected to Parliament on the Labour Party list.

== Political views ==
In her 2017 maiden statement, Russell discussed her commitments to feminism and equality. She has advocated for law changes to prevent multinational firms from "unfair[ly]" structuring their New Zealand operations in a way that enables them to minimise their tax bills. In November 2019 she said she would like New Zealand to be "the most equal country in the world – full stop".

On 22 April 2020, Russell drew media attention and public criticism when she made remarks during a video conference with the Epidemic Response Committee suggesting that the impact of the COVID-19 pandemic in New Zealand highlighted a structural weakness in the small business sector. Russell had said:

"We are seeing a number of small businesses really struggling after only a few weeks in a pretty bad situation, which must speak to the strength of those small businesses going into this lockdown. It worries me that perhaps people went into small business without understanding how you might build a business or capitalise it in the first place so that you have the ongoing strength to survive a setback."

Finance Minister Grant Robertson disagreed with her characterisation at the time, and ACT Party leader David Seymour subsequently suggested that these words were unsympathetic to small business. While many small business advisors and mentors agreed with Russell, she was criticised as being insensitive by left-wing commentator Chris Trotter, journalist Duncan Garner, and National Party MP Judith Collins.

In her role as a tax academic in 2016, Russell tweeted that she did not support removing GST from fruit and vegetables. That had been Labour Party policy in 2011, before Russell became a Labour candidate, and became party policy again in 2023, after Russell had become a minister in the Labour Government. She commented that her view had changed because food prices were no longer as stable as they were in 2016 when the tweet was posted.

Russell supported the passage of the Abortion Legislation Bill through all stages in 2019 and 2020. She voted in support of the End of Life Choice Bill at its first reading in 2017, but voted against the Bill in its final stages in 2019. At the second reading debate on the End of Life Choice Bill, she stated her support for the disabled community and her preference for improved medical care, living standards and treatment of disabled people over legalised euthanasia.

New Zealand Parliament
| Preceded by David Cunliffe | Member of Parliament for New Lynn; 2017–2023 | Succeeded by Paulo Garcia |
Political offices
| Preceded by David Clark | Minister of Statistics; 2023 | Succeeded by Andrew Bayly |
| Preceded by David Clark | Minister Responsible for the Earthquake Commission; 2023 | Succeeded by David Seymour as Associate Minister of Finance |
