= Bhupinder Singh (New Zealand cricketer) =

Indian-born New Zealand cricketer (born 1986)

Personal information
- Born: 31 October 1986 (age 39); Kapurthala, Punjab, India
- Batting: Right-handed
- Bowling: Right-arm offbreak
- Role: Off-spinner

Domestic team information
- Years: Team
- 2009/10–2013/14: Auckland
- Source: CricketArchive, 3 June 2016

Bhupinder Singh (born 31 October 1986) is an Indian-born New Zealand former cricketer. He played 22 first-class, 26 List A, and 14 Twenty20 matches between the 2009–10 and 2013–14 seasons, almost all of which were for Auckland. He also represented New Zealand A on their 2010 tour of Zimbabwe.

Born at Kapurthala in the Indian Punjab, Bhupinder was educated at Papatoetoe High School in Auckland. He played A team cricket for Auckland sides from 2008 to 2009 before making his senior debut in a November 2009 Plunket Shield fixture against Canterbury. Primarily a bowler, he took over 80 top-class wickets for Auckland. At the 2017 New Zealand general election, he stood for ACT New Zealand in the Manukau East electorate.
