= Paulo Garcia (New Zealand politician) =

New Zealand politician

Paulo Garcia MP
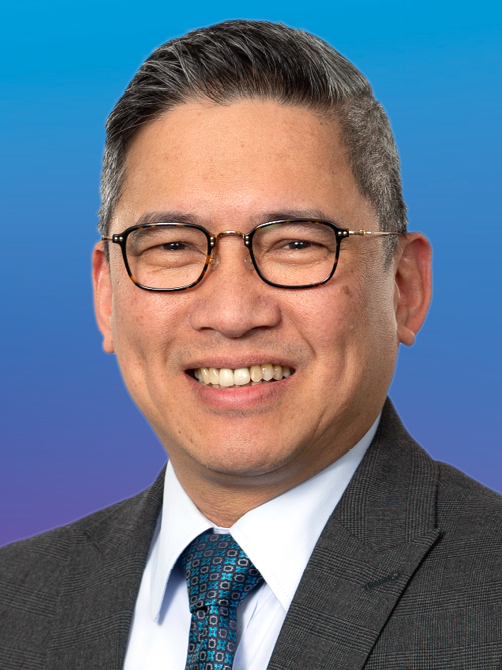
- Garcia in 2023

Member of the New Zealand Parliament for New Lynn
- Incumbent
- Assumed office 14 October 2023
- Preceded by: Deborah Russell

Member of the New Zealand Parliament for the National Party List
- In office 16 May 2019 – 17 October 2020
- Preceded by: Nuk Korako

Personal details
- Party: National
- Profession: Lawyer

Paulo Reyes Garcia is a New Zealand lawyer and politician. He is a Member of Parliament in the House of Representatives for the New Zealand National Party and the first New Zealand MP of Filipino descent.

== Early life and career ==
Garcia was born in the city of San Juan, part of the conurbation of Metropolitan Manila, Philippines in 1965. He is a graduate of the University of the Philippines, and also attended the Academy of American and International Law in Texas in the United States of America. He was a barrister before entering parliament. In the Philippines, where he practised for ten years, his focus was commercial law, particularly as it applied to foreign and multinational companies operating in that country. After moving to New Zealand, he practised immigration law with a focus on investor migration. After initially working for McLeod & Associates and Corban Revell Lawyers, he established his own firm, Garcia Law.

Paulo Garcia was appointed honorary consul of the Philippines in Auckland in 2012, and was also involved in establishing the New Zealand Philippines Business Council.

== Member of Parliament ==
New Zealand Parliament
Years	Term	Electorate	List	Party
2019–2020	52nd	List	50	National
2023–present	54th	New Lynn	34	National

=== First term, 2019–2020 ===
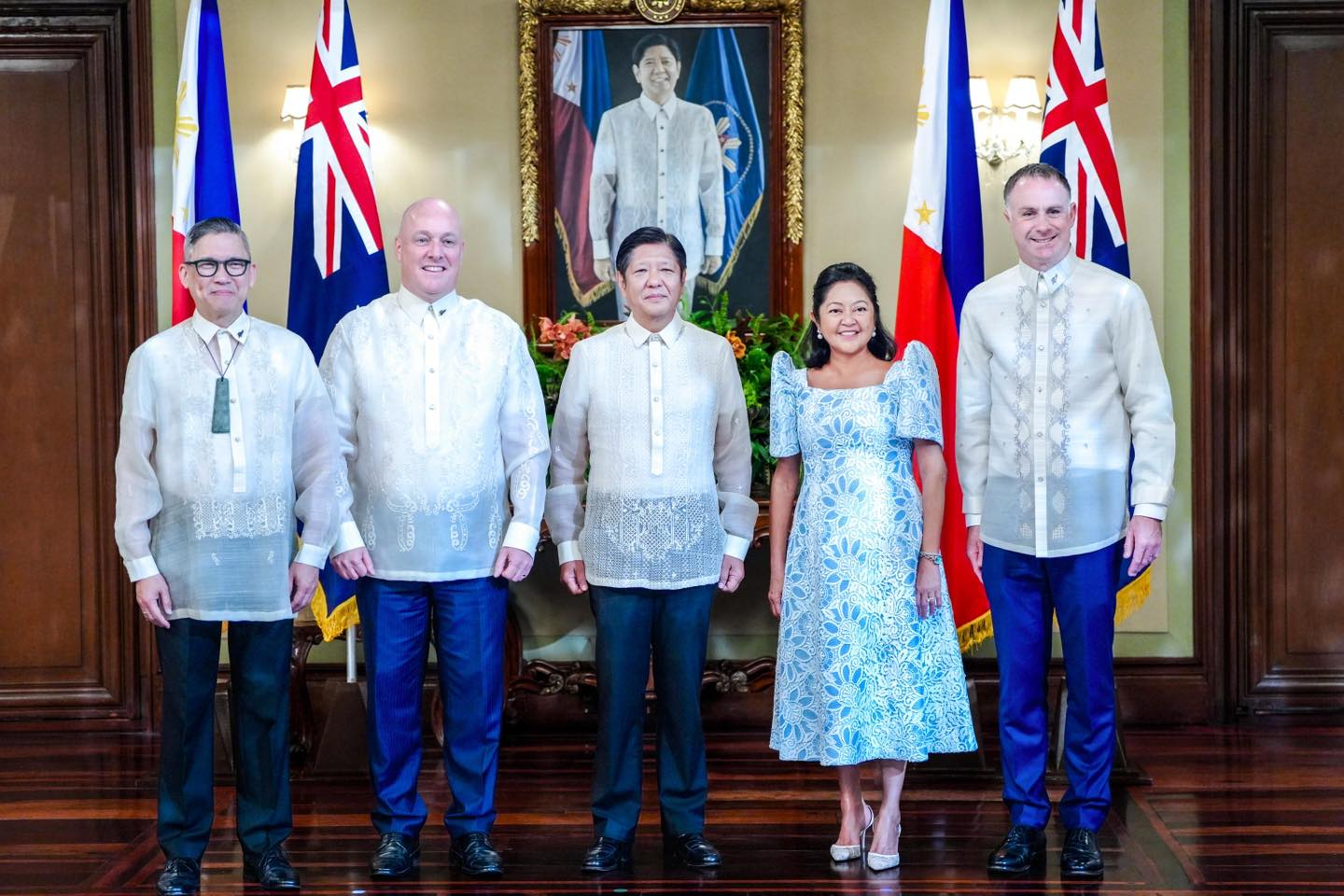
Garcia (far left) with Prime Minister Christopher Luxon, Philippine President Bongbong Marcos, First Lady Liza Araneta Marcos, and MP Simon Watts at the Malacañang Palace in Manila, 19 April 2024

In the 2017 election Garcia stood for National in the New Lynn electorate and was placed 50 on their party list. He came second to Deborah Russell with 38.55% of the vote and was not ranked high enough on National's party list to be immediately allocated a seat in Parliament.

In February 2018 Garcia and several other "next in line" list candidates attended National's parliamentary caucus meeting to help ease their transition into parliament should they enter during the course of the parliamentary term. Garcia later entered Parliament in 2019 upon the resignation of National MP Nuk Korako. He was declared elected on 16 May 2019. He became New Zealand's first MP of Filipino descent. He is the first person born in the Philippines who has been elected to the national legislature of another country. In 2020 he was briefly deputy chairperson of the Parliamentary committee on foreign affairs, defense and trade and a National Party spokesperson on land information and associate spokesperson on foreign affairs and justice.

In February 2020 the National Party board decided that Garcia would be a list-only candidate in the 2020 general election. National polled poorly at the election and Garcia lost his seat in Parliament.

=== Second term, 2023–present ===
Ahead of the 2023 New Zealand general election, Garcia was selected as the National Party candidate for New Lynn again. He defeated incumbent Deborah Russell with a final majority of 1,013 votes. In his second term he is deputy chair of the social services and community committee and has also been a member of the justice committee and petitions committee.

In early February 2024, Garcia introduced a member's bill that would seek to amend the Crimes Act 1961 to criminalise acts of "coward punching" that led to serious injuries or death. His member's bill was supported by Ultimate Fighting Championship (UFC) mixed martial arts fighter Israel Adesanya. In June 2025 the Government announced it would adopt Garcia's bill as its own.

On 16 December 2025 Garcia announced he would retire at the 2026 general election.
