= 2013 Christchurch mayoral election =

New Zealand mayoral election

- 12 October 2013
- Turnout: 102,817 (42.56%)
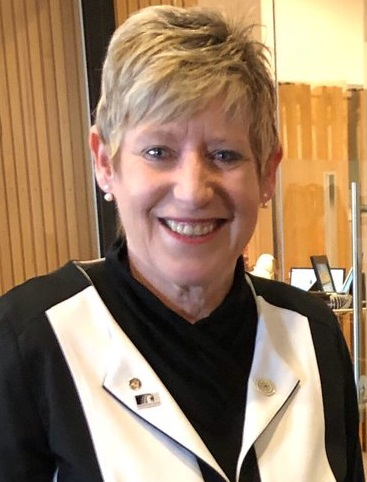

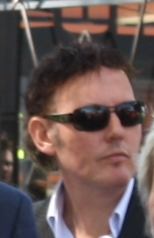
Candidate	Lianne Dalziel	Paul Lonsdale
Party	Independent	Independent
Popular vote	72,600	22,855
Percentage	71.26	22.43
Mayor before election
Bob Parker
Elected mayor
Lianne Dalziel

The 2013 Christchurch mayoral election was part of the New Zealand local elections and was won by former MP Lianne Dalziel. The elections were held on 12 October 2013 for the Mayor of Christchurch plus other local government roles.

Incumbent Bob Parker announced 14 months prior to the election that he would seek a third term as mayor. There was much speculation for many months over who would challenge Parker. Dalziel's name was persistently mentioned, but she denied any interest, declaring instead that the job that she really wanted is Gerry Brownlee's as Earthquake Recovery Minister, rather than Bob Parker's. Three first term councillors were also rumoured, with Tim Carter seen as the most likely to come forward. In April 2013, Christchurch's main newspaper, The Press, announced that Dalziel would stand, having asked Student Volunteer Army organiser Sam Johnson to be her running mate. This caused surprise since Dalziel and Johnson are from opposite ends of the political spectrum, but he declined the invitation anyway. It was not until mid June that Dalziel confirmed her candidacy. At the same time, serious problems developed at Christchurch City Council (CCC) over building consent issues, which led to Parker withdrawing his candidacy and council's chief executive, Tony Marryatt, losing his job. In early August, central city retail manager Paul Lonsdale announced his candidacy and was immediately credited by The Press as the most viable alternative to Dalziel, but senior journalist Lois Cairns predicted the following day that Lonsdale "will come in a distant second". Dalziel, the former Labour Party MP for Christchurch East and up to the election the representative of the Christchurch East electorate, had been in Parliament since 1990 and was considered the top favourite. Of the remaining ten candidates, The Press labelled them a mixture of eccentrics, tryers and also-rans.

Dalziel won the election with nearly a 50,000 votes margin and a majority of 48%, with Lonsdale receiving nearly 23,000 votes. Lonsdale also stood for a position as city councillor and was successful on that front. The third placed mayoral candidate received a mere 1,000 votes. Dalziel and the new council were sworn in on 24 October.

== Candidates ==
2012 and earlier

Since the February 2011 Christchurch earthquake, there were persistent rumours that Labour Party MP Lianne Dalziel would contest the 2013 Christchurch mayoralty. Dalziel had first been elected to Parliament in the 1990 election, representing first Christchurch Central and since 1996 the Christchurch East electorate. In May 2012, Dalziel tried to put an end to the rumours by announcing: "The job I really want is Gerry Brownlee's, rather than Bob Parker's." Brownlee was Earthquake Recovery Minister, whilst Parker was then Mayor of Christchurch.

In August, Parker announced that he would seek a third term as mayor. Due to the controversy caused during his mayoralty, the general expectation had been that he would not seek re-election. There was confidence in the neighbouring areas that Selwyn District and Waimakariri District Councils had responded well to the earthquakes, but the same could not be said for Christchurch City Council (CCC). Former National Party cabinet minister Philip Burdon called Christchurch Council's response a "dysfunctional failure". CCC had commissioned an external communications review in 2012, which found that the council was seen as having a "can't do attitude", and that it was commonly agreed that the organisation was not customer focussed. The report concluded:

Christchurch City Council is an isolated "fortress" which is "culturally reluctant" to communicate openly with its city's inhabitants

At the time of Parker's announcement, the main Christchurch newspaper, The Press, published a list of other likely candidates. Dalziel was understood to be backing prominent businessman Humphry Rolleston. Rolleston was on the board of several companies that were listed on the stock exchange and until 2004 had been in business with Allan Hubbard.

In the second half of the year, former mayor Garry Moore actively sought media exposure and when asked about his career aspirations replied: "I spent 15 years of my life on the council and it worries me where democracy is heading in Christchurch." The Press listed three sitting councillors who had possible mayoral aspirations: Peter Beck, Tim Carter, and Glenn Livingstone. All three were in their first term, with Beck first elected in a February 2012 by-election. In a follow-up article in November, The Press added Canterbury Employers' Chamber of Commerce chief executive Peter Townsend and radio host Mike Yardley to the list of potential mayoral candidates.

2013

In the February 2013 reshuffle of opposition portfolios, Dalziel dropped out of the top 20; only the first 20 positions are ranked by the Labour Party. An editorial in The Press speculated that she might reconsider her political future:

The demotion is bound to concentrate Dalziel's mind on whether she should run for the Christchurch mayoralty. As things stand, a place for her in a Labour cabinet as minister for the earthquake recovery looks unlikely, but she would be a strong candidate for mayor.

By March, Parker was still the only person who had declared their candidacy. An editorial in The Press discussed two possible opponents: Tim Carter and Lianne Dalziel. Carter is from Christchurch's richest family, with his father Philip topping the local rich-list, and there has been a long-running political interest in his family. Philip Carter was a Christchurch city councillor from 1989 to 1995, David Carter, a brother of Philip Carter, is the current Speaker of the New Zealand House of Representatives, and their father Maurice Carter was a Christchurch city councillor from 1956 to 1989.

On 10 April, Carter was hosted by The Press for a livechat event, where questions put to Carter by readers were answered online by him. Whilst Carter said that he would only make a decision whether to stand in the coming weeks, the newspaper commented that his answers were campaign-style, that he used "fait accompli-language", and that he had "launched a pre-election broadside at mayoral incumbent Bob Parker".

The Press reported on 20 April that Lianne Dalziel will challenge Parker for the mayoralty, and that she had asked Student Volunteer Army organiser Sam Johnson to be her running mate, with a view of Johnson becoming deputy mayor. The newspaper expressed surprise by this pairing, given that Dalziel is a Labour Party member, and Johnson is a member of the Young Nats, the youth arm of the National Party. Johnson declined the invitation, and Dalziel maintained that she was not yet committed to standing, saying that it required the right team to be formed. Speaking at the annual general meeting of the Christchurch East Labour Party electoral committee some days later, she expressed her disappointment at Johnson having declined her invitation. Meanwhile, Labour's deputy leader, Grant Robertson, confirmed that Dalziel had been open to the party hierarchy about considering the Christchurch mayoralty, and that the party had giving her the freedom to make any decision about her future.

Carter announced on 24 April that he would not contest the mayoralty, but that he would endorse Dalziel instead. This followed several meetings between him and Dalziel that "left him convinced she was the best person for the job". Dalziel, meanwhile, had still not confirmed that she would stand in the election. Carter reiterated in mid-July that he would not stand for the mayoralty, and announced that he may indeed retire from the city council altogether. Vicki Buck and Garry Moore, the only two ex-mayors alive, were reported in early June as both considering running as councillors in the local elections, but both ruled out standing for the mayoralty; Buck also ruled out standing for the deputy-mayoralty. Buck confirmed that she had been meeting regularly with Dalziel, and Moore commented of Dalziel announcing her mayoralty bid as "reasonably high". Moore and Buck both expressed dissatisfaction with the performance of the current council, with Moore saying:

Vicki and I have been sitting weeping into our coffees for the last couple of years. We have looked at all our hard work and thought: 'My God, what's happening?' This is not a place for show ponies, it's a time for carefully thought through strategic thinking.

Moore's comment was a swipe at Parker, who is by many referred to as a "show pony". Parker, meanwhile, was rumoured by The Sunday Star-Times to retire at the end of the term, which he immediately denied.

On 19 June, Dalziel formally confirmed that she would contest the mayoralty, also announcing that she would resign from Parliament with effect from the day prior to the mayoral election, which would cause a by-election in the Christchurch East electorate. Dalziel stated that she would not run for Labour, but that she would contest the election as an independent. Despite Dalziel's earlier claims that she had to form a strong team first before she would stand, she declared that she would not form a team and did not have a 'running mate', i.e. deputy mayor.

After a troublesome period starting in mid-June, Christchurch City Council lost its accreditation with International Accreditation New Zealand (IANZ) for issuing building consents, and council's CEO, Tony Marryatt, was placed on indefinite leave on 3 July. On Friday morning, 5 July 2013, The Press was working on a feature article for the first opinion poll and phoned Parker and Dalziel for their reactions on the 30% and 70% respective poll results. Later that afternoon, Parker gave an exclusive interview to John Campbell in which he announced that he would not stand for re-election. The interview was screened on Campbell Live that evening.

On 1 August, Hugo Kristinsson joined the mayoralty contest. He was an IT specialist from Iceland who came to Christchurch in 1995.

On 9 August, Christchurch businessman Paul Lonsdale announced his candidacy for a position as councillor in the Hagley-Ferrymead ward, and as mayor. Lonsdale was regarded by the local paper, The Press, as "the most viable alternative yet to Lianne Dalziel" and was endorsed by Parker for his "many fine qualities". Lonsdale was best known as the driving force behind the Re:START mall project, and was previously the manager of Riccarton Mall. Lonsdale works closely with property developer Antony Gough, who is the current chairman of the Central City Business Association, and Gough's preference was for Lonsdale to only contest a city council position, as Dalziel "is the frontrunner by a country mile". In an opinion piece, senior journalist Lois Cairns credited Lonsdale as the person with the best name recognition yet who can challenge Dalziel, but that he was not likely to be able to keep up with her campaign: "In all likelihood Lonsdale will come in a distant second." The Press asked candidates about their five key issues, to which 10 of the 12 nominated candidates replied. In a commentary, the newspaper stated:

With sitting Mayor Bob Parker out of the contention, the contest is effectively Lianne Dalziel's to lose. She faces some competition in the form of prominent business figure Paul Lonsdale, but the other 10 candidates are a mixture of eccentrics, tryers and also-rans.

=== List of candidates ===
When nominations closed, there were twelve candidates for the Christchurch mayoralty:

- Blair Anderson (Another MildGreen Initiative) – a perennial mayoral candidate since 2004 who achieved his best result of 0.94% of the vote at his first attempt. He is one of two candidates who did not respond to The Press about his top issues, thus not giving readers and voters an idea what he stands for.
- Victor Cattermole (Independent) – a first time candidate for the mayoralty. Cattermole is a company director, and 20 companies that he was involved in were struck off the register or liquidated over a 10-year period. He was convicted of unlawfully using documents in 2005. He signed papers to buy Erskine College in Wellington in 1994 for NZ$1m and moved into a flat on school grounds, but was eventually evicted as payment was not forthcoming. He tried to buy Portsmouth Football Club in 2010 for €200m.
- Kyle Chapman (The Resistance Party) – he previously stood for the Christchurch mayoralty in 2004 and 2007, with his best result of 1.9% of the vote in 2004. He has been involved with several far-right organisations, including the New Zealand National Front. Chapman has a conviction for fire-bombing a marae.
- Lianne Dalziel (One City Together) – a first time candidate for the mayoralty. Dalziel had been in Parliament for the Labour Party since the 1990 election. She said she would resign her seat just before the votes were counted, which would cause a by-election in the Christchurch East electorate later in 2013.
- Michael "Tubby" Hansen (Economic Euthenics) – a perennial candidate for the Christchurch mayoralty and a multitude of other elections. Hansen has been contesting the mayoralty since the 1971 Christchurch mayoral election, with 1.24% of the vote in 1971 his top result.
- Sammy Harris (Independent) – a first time candidate. He is one of two candidates who did not respond to The Press about his top issues.
- Hugo Kristinsson – a first time candidate. Kristinsson is an IT consultant from Iceland who emigrated to New Zealand in 1995. A resident of South New Brighton, he is regarded by his local community as an expert in land and insurance issues.
- Paul Lonsdale (Independent) – a first time candidate. He is a prominent businessman in retail, known for his involvement in Re:Start, and he was previously the manager for Merivale Mall and The Palms. Lonsdale is receiving advice and financial support from Roger Bridge, who is a senior figure in the National Party; Bridge stresses that he is supporting Lonsdale in an individual capacity.
- Robin McCarthy (Independent) – he previously contested the mayoralty in 2001 as a Libertarian. McCarthy is a tour operator.
- Brad Maxwell (Independent) – he previously contested the 2010 mayoralty and received 0.8% of the vote. Maxwell is a real estate agent, known for annually opening his decorated home over the Christmas period for a donation since 1994. Maxwell's innovative scheme of selling the family home in 2009 was regarded as illegal gambling by the Department of Internal Affairs and disallowed.
- Rik Tindall (Independent) – he previously contested the 2010 mayoralty and received 1.01% of the vote, which saw him come fourth. In the same election, he unsuccessfully stood as councillor for the Burwood-Pegasus ward. He was a councillor for Environment Canterbury from 2007 until the elected body got disestablished by the government in 2010, and is known for his advocacy for clean drinking water.
- Peter Wakeman (Independent) – a perennial mayoral candidate who previously stood in 1998, 2007, and 2010. His claim to fame during the 2013 campaign was when he disrupted the official campaign launch of fellow candidate Dalziel, which resulted in him being manhandled on the stage and was reported in both local and national media, including TV3 News and National Radio. Glenn Conway, chief political reporter for The Press, described Wakeman's behaviour at Dalziel's campaign launch as "bizarre".

== Campaign ==
On 19 September, six of the candidates held an open-air forum on the corner of Fitzgerald Avenue and Ferry Road. It was organised by Wakeman, Anderson, and Tindall over concerns that the lesser candidates do not receive enough attention from the media. In addition to the organisers, Cattermole, Kristinsson, and Maxwell attended in front of 20 members of the public.

On 23 September, The Press editor Joanna Norris moderated a debate between the two top candidates, Dalziel and Lonsdale, at the Cardboard Cathedral. The sold-out event was attended by 450 members of the public.

On 25 September, the Canterbury Employers' Chamber of Commerce hosted Dalziel and Lonsdale to address about 50 of their members. There was much common ground between the speakers, and both advocated closer ties to neighbouring councils Selwyn, Waimakariri, and Hurunui, with Lonsdale suggesting that conversations about an Auckland-style "super city" should be had.

On 3 October, eight of the candidates participated in a debate at the University of Canterbury, organised by the university's political science club and moderated by the political science lecturer, Lindsey MacDonald. About fifty people attended the debate.

== Opinion polls ==
The Press published its first opinion poll on 6 July, but as the main event of the day was Parker's announcement to withdraw from the race, more detailed results were only published two days later on 8 July. Of the decided voters, 70% supported Dalziel and 30% supported Parker. 32% of those polled had yet to decide whom to vote for. The survey work was carried out between 30 June and 3 July, and the poll had a margin of error of 3.5%.

The Press published its second opinion poll on 21 September. It had Dalziel on 75% of the decided voters, with Lonsdale on 21% in second place. None of the other candidates polled above 1%. 17% of voters had not decided whom to vote for. The survey work was carried out in late August and early September, and the poll had a margin of error of 5.2%.

The Press published its third opinion poll on 30 September. It had Dalziel on 78% of the vote, with Lonsdale on 19% in second place. Hansen and Maxwell both received 1% of the support, and the remaining candidates a combined 2%, whilst 1% did not know whom to vote for. The poll was carried out between 17 and 25 September, questioned 541 people, and had a margin of error of 3.49%. In addition, a further 190 respondents stated that they would not vote.

Political scientist Bronwyn Hayward, a lecturer at the University of Canterbury, predicted a poor turnout based on the one-sidedness of the race, and tiredness of the voting populations due to earthquake-induced stress.

Polling firm	Date	Ref	Lianne Dalziel	Bob Parker	Paul Lonsdale	Brad Maxwell	Michael Hansen	Victor Cattermole	Peter Wakeman	Rik Tindall	Kyle Chapman	Margin of error
Research First	6 Jul 13		70	30								±3.5 pp
UMR Research	21 Sep		75		21	1	1	1	1	1	1	±5.2 pp
Research First	30 Sep		78		19	1	1					±3.49 pp

== Timeline and election ==
Local elections happen across New Zealand on the same day. Under section 10 of the Local Electoral Act 2001, a "general election of members of every local authority or community board must be held on the second Saturday in October in every third year" from the date the Act came into effect in 2001, meaning 12 October 2013. The local elections include District Health Board members. In 2013, Christchurch voters thus voted for a mayor, city councillors, community board members, and District Health Board members. All elections were conducted by postal ballot. Like most other local authorities, Christchurch City Council used the first-past-the-post (FPP) voting system.

Key dates for the election as set out by the Electoral Commission were:

1 July 2013	Enrolment drive
4 July 2013	Householders who did not receive their enrolment pack need to take steps to enrol
16 July 2013	Last day for enrolment for postal voting
20 September 2013	Postal voting commences
11 October 2013	Last day to enrol to vote
12 October 2013	Election Day – Voting closes at 12 noon

== Results ==
Dalziel was elected, and preliminary results saw her having received some 48,000 more votes than her nearest rival, Lonsdale. Final results were published on 17 October, and declared in a public notice on 19 October, with the margin between the top contenders having increased to 49,745 votes.

Unlike Dalziel, who contested the mayoralty only, Lonsdale also stood for a position as a city councillor and came second in the two-member Hagley-Ferrymead ward, and was thus confirmed elected. As The Press had predicted, the remaining mayoral candidates received a low number of votes, with only Cattermole gaining just over 1,000 votes. The mayor and councillors were sworn in on 24 October.

2013 Christchurch mayoral election
Party	Candidate	Votes	%	±%
One City Together	Lianne Dalziel	72,600	71.26	
Independent	Paul Lonsdale	22,855	22.43	
Independent	Victor Cattermole	1,025	1.01	
	Hugo Kristinsson	988	0.97	
Independent	Rik Tindall	880	0.86	−0.15
Independent	Brad Maxwell	819	0.80	+0.00
Independent	Sammy Harris	585	0.57	
The Resistance Party	Kyle Chapman	503	0.49	
Another Mildgreen Initiative	Blair Anderson	480	0.47	−0.19
Independent	Robin McCarthy	396	0.39	
Independent	Peter Wakeman	391	0.38	+0.17
Economic Euthenics	Tubby Hansen	364	0.36	+0.23
Informal votes		201	0.19	
Rejected ballots		1,364	1.32	
Majority		49,745	48.82	
Turnout		103,250		

== Voting statistics ==
Participation in local elections had been falling for years to a low in 2004. In the 2013 local election, 42.56% of registered voters cast their vote, which is significantly lower than the 2010 election, when the increased interest was caused by the 2010 Canterbury earthquake just prior to the election. The following table shows the voting statistics since the 1989 local elections:

	1989	1992	1995	1998	2001	2004	2007	2010	2013
Electors on rolls	200,915	208,533	215,621	223,832	227,793	235,930	251,173	(Note: Roll data not provided)	241,581
Voters	121,680	105,982	107,450	116,511	110,068	91,027	102,495	(Note: Voter numbers not provided)	102,817
Percentage voted	60.56%	50.82%	49.83%	52.05%	48.32%	38.58%	40.81%	51.68%	42.56%

Table footnotes:
