= 2001 Christchurch mayoral election =

New Zealand mayoral election

- 13 October 2001
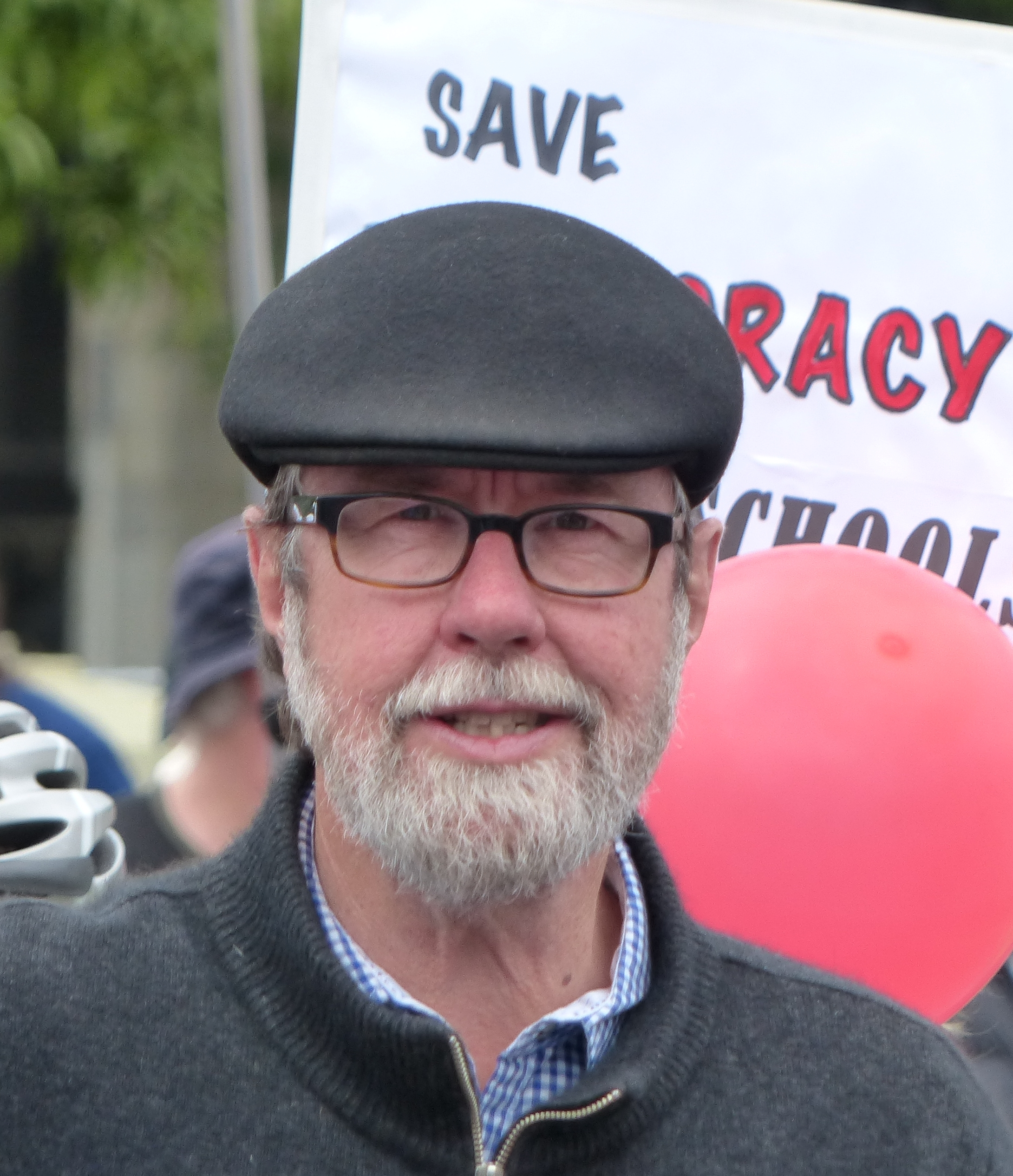

Candidate	Garry Moore	George Balani	Gordon Freeman
Party	Christchurch 2021	Independent	Ind. Citizens
Popular vote	47,142	30,149	14,213
Percentage	42.55	27.21	12.83
Mayor before election
Garry Moore
Elected mayor
Garry Moore

The 2001 Christchurch mayoral election was part of the 2001 New Zealand local elections. Incumbent Garry Moore beat talk back radio and television host George Balani.

== Background ==
On 13 October of that year, elections were held for the Mayor of Christchurch plus other local government roles. Despite predictions for a close race, incumbent Moore successfully contested a second term in office with a decisive majority. The second-placed candidate, Balani, was 17,000 votes (15%) behind Moore. Two former Christchurch City Councillors, Gordon Freeman and Robin Booth, came third and fourth.

Moore's main challenger, Balani, had a high profile as a talk back radio and television host; for many years, Balani had a show on Canterbury Television (CTV). A total of 14 candidates contested the 2001 mayoralty in Christchurch. Freeman was a city councillor for 15 years until he stood for mayor only in the 1998 mayoralty. Booth went into the election as a sitting member of Christchurch City Council.

== Results ==
2001 Christchurch mayoral election
Party	Candidate	Votes	%	±%
Christchurch 2021	Garry Moore	47,142	42.55	
Independent	George Balani	30,149	27.21	
Independent Citizens	Gordon Freeman	14,213	12.83	
Independent	Robin Booth	6,421	5.80	
Independent	Aaron Keown	4,422	3.99	
Independent	Penny Hargreaves	2,036	1.84	
Somebody Who Cares	Bill Greenwood	1,327	1.20	
Criminal Reform in Motion	Shane Turner	971	0.88	
The Party Party	Andrew Brown	461	0.42	
Independent	Sugra Morley	429	0.39	
Communist League	Annalucia Vermunt	368	0.33	
Libertarianz	Robin McCarthy	321	0.29	
www.chchratepayers.com	Paul Telfer	297	0.27	
Economic Euthenics	Tubby Hansen	195	0.18	
Informal votes		2,050	1.85	
Majority		16,993	15.34	
Turnout		110,802		

Moore, Balani and Freeman stood for mayor only. Robin Booth also stood for city councillor in the two-representative Shirley Ward, but came third and was thus defeated. Aaron Keown, who came fifth in the election, was later a Christchurch City Councillor from 2010 for one three-year term. Moore remained mayor until the 2007 election, when he decided not to stand again.
