= 2004 Christchurch mayoral election =

New Zealand mayoral election

- 9 October 2004
- Turnout: 91,102 (38.61%)
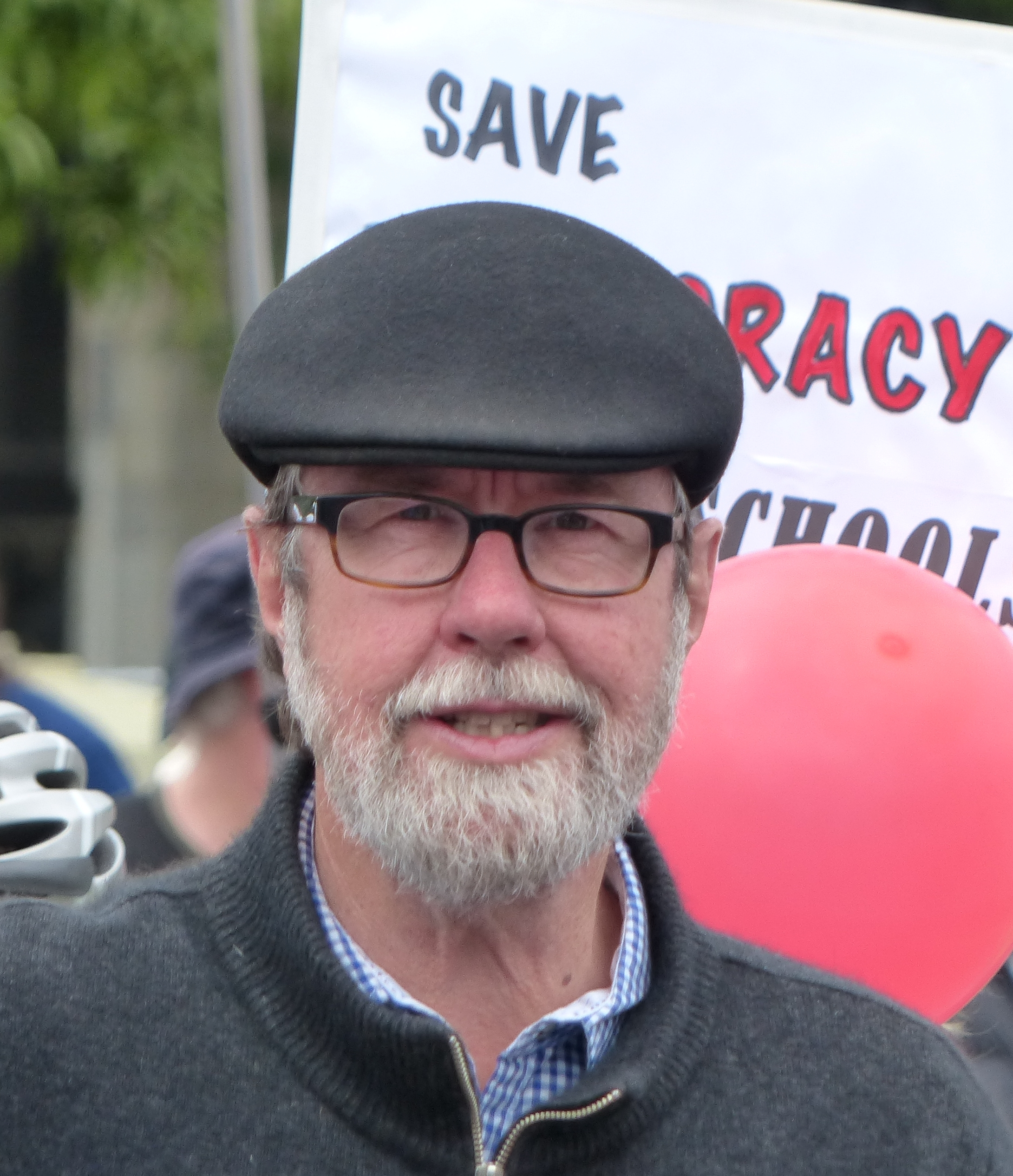

Candidate	Garry Moore	Aaron Keown	Jamie Gough
Party	Christchurch 2021	Independent	Independent
Popular vote	61,170	11,476	7,200
Percentage	69.70	13.08	8.20
Mayor before election
Garry Moore
Elected mayor
Garry Moore

The 2004 Christchurch mayoral election was part of the 2004 New Zealand local elections. On 9 October of that year, elections were held for the Mayor of Christchurch plus other local government roles. Incumbent Garry Moore successfully contested a third term in office with a decisive majority. The second-placed candidate, Aaron Keown, received almost 50,000 fewer votes than Moore. Keown ran as an independent, but contested the 2008 general election for ACT New Zealand, standing in the Waimakariri electorate. The third-placed candidate, Jamie Gough, was only 18 years old at the time.

Both Keown and Gough were elected Christchurch City Councillors at the 2010 local elections.

== Results ==
2004 Christchurch mayoral election
Party	Candidate	Votes	%	±%
Christchurch 2021	Garry Moore	61,170	69.70	+27.15
Independent	Aaron Keown	11,476	13.08	+9.09
Independent	Jamie Gough	7,200	8.20	
Independent	Bob Nimmo	2,378	2.71	
National Front	Kyle Chapman	1,665	1.90	
Independent	Paul Telfer	1,560	1.78	+1.51
Independent	Blair Anderson	823	0.94	
Anti-Capitalist Alliance	Sam Kingi	719	0.82	
Communist League	Annalucia Vermunt	395	0.45	+0.12
Independent	Tubby Hansen	372	0.42	+0.24
Informal votes		255		
Rejected ballots		3,344	3.67	
Majority		49,694	56.63	
Turnout		91,102	38.61	−9.71

== Voting statistics ==
Participation in local elections has been falling for years. In the 2004 local election, only 38.6% of registered voters cast their vote. The following table shows the voting statistics since the 1989 local elections:

	1989	1992	1995	1998	2001	2004
Electors on rolls	200,915	208,533	215,621	223,832	227,793	235,930
Voters	121,680	105,982	107,450	116,511	110,068	91,027^{1}
Percentage voted	60.56%	50.82%	49.83%	52.05%	48.32%	38.58%

Table notes: ^{1} Note that the number of voters reported in the summary report differs by 75 compared to the declaration of results of election.
