= 2013 Christchurch East by-election =

New Zealand by-election

- 30 November 2013
- Turnout: 13,726
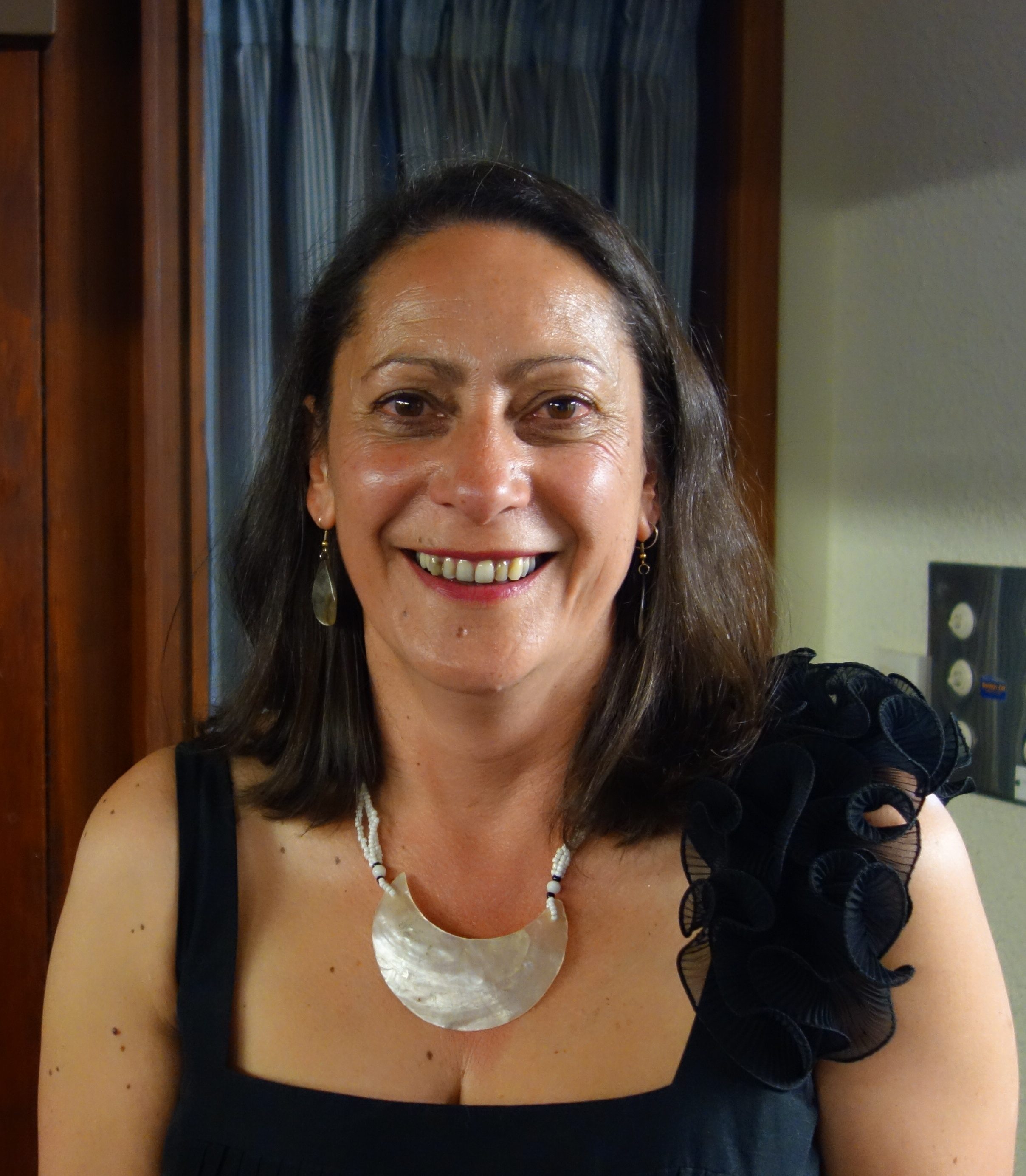

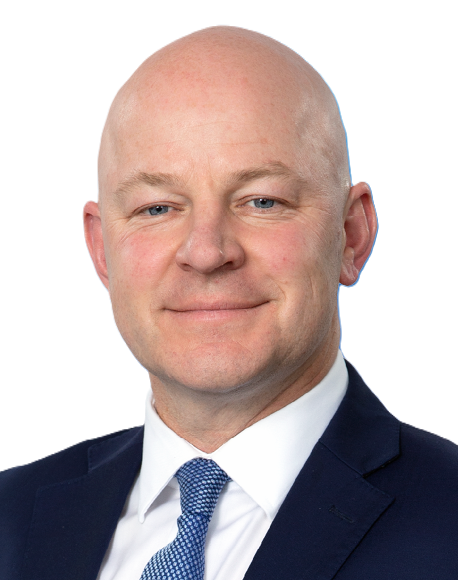

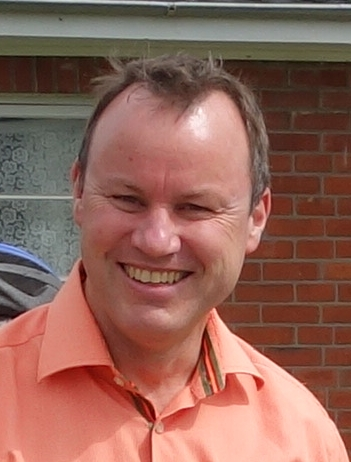
	First party	Second party	Third party
Candidate	Poto Williams	Matt Doocey	David Moorhouse
Party	Labour	National	Green
Popular vote	8,414	3,577	954
Percentage	61.30%	26.06%	6.96%
Swing	▲5.86pp	▼10.40pp	▲2.15pp
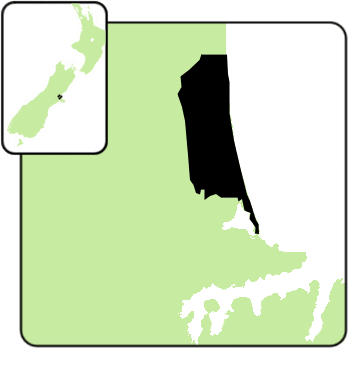
- Christchurch East electorate boundaries used for the by-election
MP before election
Lianne Dalziel
Labour
Elected MP
Poto Williams
Labour

A by-election was held in the New Zealand electorate of Christchurch East on 30 November 2013. The seat was vacated following the resignation of Lianne Dalziel of the Labour Party from parliament, who contested and won the Christchurch mayoralty in October 2013.

The electorate is regarded as a safe Labour seat; the party has, apart from the 50-year gap when the electorate was abolished, held the electorate since the 1922 election, although significant population changes since the 2011 Christchurch earthquake had made this allegiance to Labour less certain. Prior to the election, National's top party official in Canterbury had conceded that the by-election was "very, very hard for [National] to win". The by-election was won by Labour's Poto Williams, who prior to her selection as Labour's candidate was virtually unknown.

== Background ==
Following months of speculation, The Press reported on 20 April 2013 that Lianne Dalziel would challenge Bob Parker for the Christchurch mayoralty. On 19 June Dalziel formally confirmed that she would contest the mayoralty, also announcing that she would resign from Parliament, which would cause a by-election in the Christchurch East electorate. Dalziel's resignation took effect on 11 October, the day before the announcement of the mayoralty election-results.

== Candidates ==
Ten candidates were nominated.

=== Poto Williams (Labour) ===
The Labour Party nominated Poto Williams for the by-election. In a surprise move, then Labour leader David Shearer appointed former MP Jim Anderton as the party's by-election campaign manager. Anderton, who was first elected to Parliament in 1984 for Labour in Sydenham, left the party in 1989 over policy differences and, until his retirement as MP in 2011, led his own parties (the NewLabour Party and Jim Anderton's Progressive Party). The Labour Party nomination process started in August and Deon Swiggs was the first person to declare his candidacy. Swiggs, a 26-year-old who developed a profile following the 2011 Christchurch earthquake, has been a Labour supporter since age 15. A day later, James Caygill confirmed his candidacy to represent the Labour Party. He is the son of former Minister of Finance David Caygill. The third person to join the Labour candidacy race was Tina Lomax, who is the principal of Kingslea School and who, from 2004 to 2010, was a Burwood-Pegasus Community Board member. Karen Hayes is a registered nurse and midwife, Christina Laalaai-Tausa is a PhD candidate at the University of Canterbury, and the sixth candidate was Poto Williams, the regional manager of St John of God Hauora Trust. Clayton Cosgrove, an existing list MP who had lost the Waimakariri electorate to National's Kate Wilkinson at the last election, had considered standing in the by-election, but in the end decided not to put his name forward for the Labour nomination.

=== Matt Doocey (National) ===
The National Party nominated political newcomer Matt Doocey for the by-election, who is a manager for the Canterbury District Health Board. The party's Canterbury Westland Regional Chair, Roger Bridge, noted that a sitting government has never won a by-election in an electorate that it did not already hold. Bridge later conceded that it would be "very, very hard for us to win". When Kate Wilkinson, National MP for the Waimakariri electorate, announced in early November 2013 that she would retire at the end of the term of the 50th Parliament, rumours immediately surfaced that Doocey would replace her as National's Waimakariri candidate, and the Christchurch East by-election would help him gain experience in contesting an election.

Doocey is a member of the well-known Carter family. Family patriarch Maurice Carter, a Christchurch City Councillor for over 30 years (1956–1989), was his grandfather, and the Speaker of the House of Representatives, David Carter, is his uncle. Doocey grew up in Christchurch and attended St Bede's College for his secondary schooling. The Dooceys bought their current home in Redwood, which currently falls into the Waimakariri electorate, in April 2011.

=== David Moorhouse (Green) ===
The Green Party nominated software developer David Moorhouse for the by-election. He stood for the party in Christchurch Central electorate at the 2011 general election.

=== Other candidates ===
ACT Party

Gareth Veale was the candidate for the ACT Party. Veale is a 24-year-old earthquake claims specialist whose campaign is focusing on issues of crime and property rights.

Aotearoa Legalise Cannabis Party

Paula Lambert was the candidate for the Aotearoa Legalise Cannabis Party.

Conservative Party

The Conservative Party nominated Leighton Baker, a future leader of the party.

Democrats for Social Credit

The Democrats for Social Credit nominated Jenner Lichtwark, a novelist.

Independents

Three people were contesting the by-election as independent candidates. One, Adam Holland, previously contested the Ikaroa-Rāwhiti by-election, and says that he will be running on "a platform of donating the entirety of my parliamentary salary to the region". The other independent candidates are Ian Gaskin and Sam Park.

Blair Anderson, a former deputy leader of the Aotearoa Legalise Cannabis Party, considered standing as an independent, but did not put a nomination forward. He had previously stood unsuccessfully for the Christchurch mayoralty on several occasions.

== Results ==
The following table shows the final results of the by-election:

2013 Christchurch East by-election
Notes: Blue background denotes the winner of the by-election. Pink background denotes a candidate elected from their party list prior to the by-election. Yellow background denotes the winner of the by-election, who was a list MP prior to the by-election. A ✓ or ✗ denotes status of any incumbent, win or lose respectively.
Party	Candidate	Votes	%	±%
Labour	Poto Williams	8,414	61.39	+5.86
National	Matt Doocey	3,577	26.10	−10.40
Green	David Moorhouse	954	6.96	+2.15
Conservative	Leighton Baker	494	3.60	+1.74
Independent	Sam Park	78	0.57	+0.57
Legalise Cannabis	Paula Lambert	59	0.43	−0.48
ACT	Gareth Veale	58	0.42	+0.42
Independent	Adam Holland	31	0.23	+0.23
Independent	Ian Gaskin	20	0.15	+0.15
Democrats	Jenner Lichtwark	20	0.15	+0.15
Total Valid votes		13,705		
Informal votes		21	0.15	-1.63
Turnout		13,726		
Labour hold	Majority	4,837	35.29	+16.25
