= Kyle Chapman (New Zealand activist) =

New Zealand far-right political activist

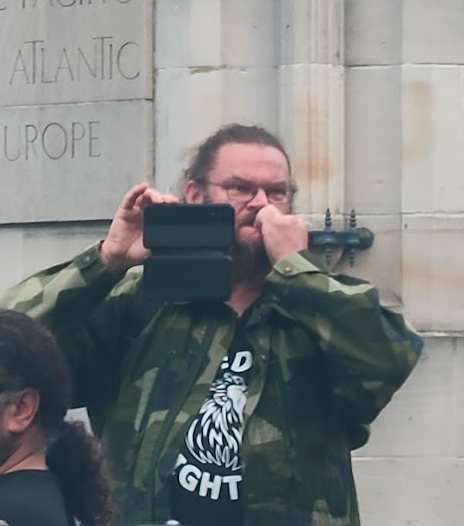
- Kyle Chapman in 2023
- Born: 1971 (age 55); Taumarunui, New Zealand
- Occupation: Activist
- Political party: New Zealand National Front
- Children: at least 1

Kyle Chapman (born 1971) is a New Zealand far-right political activist and the former national director of the New Zealand National Front (NZNF), a white nationalist political party. He has stood unsuccessfully three times for the Christchurch mayoralty: first for the NZNF (2004); then for the National Democrats Party (2007); and then for the Resistance Party (2013).

Chapman founded Right Wing Resistance, a neo-Nazi group, in 2009. Since 2023, he has also been involved with a group that targets the LGBT community.

== Personal life ==
Chapman was born in Taumarunui, New Zealand.

In May 2009, Chapman married, but separated in October of the same year. His wife stated that Chapman had vowed to give up his far-right activities, but she ended the relationship when he did not. She was pregnant with his child at the time they split.

== Activities ==
Chapman was the founding member of the New Zealand Hammerskins.

He was convicted of fire-bombing a marae during the late 1980s and early 1990s. He admitted to hurling Molotov cocktails at various buildings, including Ngāi Tahu Murihiku Marae and a school.

In January 2009 an email was sent out concerning Chapman's plans to create a European culture "protected community" in North Canterbury. The email stated that his intention was to "build a unified mini state that we could build up in future to be a base for other like minded Europeans to come to from other dying countries". The email claimed the compound would have a school, accommodation, a meeting house for leaders, and a training area for sport fighting and survival training.

=== Running for offices ===
In 2004, he unsuccessfully contested the mayoralty of Christchurch, New Zealand, placing 5th out of 10 with 1.9 per cent of the vote (1665 votes).

In 2005, he was the tenth-ranked list candidate for the Direct Democracy Party. The party, which only contested the 2005 general election, did not achieve representation.

He unsuccessfully contested the Christchurch mayoralty again in 2007, running this time under the National Democrats ticket.

In 2013, Chapman ran again for the Christchurch mayoralty, but was unsuccessful, securing 499 votes. He also ran for the Ferrymead-Pegasus Local Board, securing 641 votes, but was also unsuccessful there.

=== Turning his back on politics ===
After the 2019 Christchurch mosque shootings Chapman said he had "fallen out" with others in groups he used to belong in and "turned his back" on them to focus on family and religion. This was disputed by a holocaust historian, who said his statement was "an object lesson in the tactics these groups use to legitimise themselves through media manipulation".

=== COVID-19 pandemic ===
On 20 August 2021, Chapman and two other individuals appeared in the Christchurch District Court after they broke COVID-19 lockdown restrictions to protest those restrictions the day before in Christchurch. The three individuals were remanded in custody on charges of failing to comply with restrictions under the COVID-19 Public Health Response Act 2020.

=== 2023: Plots against Pride event and arrest ===
Chapman was involved in 'Room 102', also called the 'Robert Grey Life Centre', a Christchurch-based group of conspiracy theorists and extremists. The group targeted an event where drag queens read stories to children. Ultimately 50 people protested the event, with an equal number of counter-protestors. Chapman has used group's headquarters to hold survivalist workshops and martial art sessions.

On 20 February 2024, Chapman was sentenced to six months' community detention and six months of supervision after he pleaded guilty to unlawful possession of a Norinco semi-automatic rifle. This was one of the semi-automatic weapons banned following the Christchurch mosque shootings. He also pleaded guilty to possession of ammunition and parts for a rifle.

Court documents showed that Chapman had recently met with ex-marines and soldiers in the United States and that he had formed a new survivalist group in North Canterbury.

== Organisations ==
=== National Front ===
Chapman is a former leader of the New Zealand National Front, leading the organisation from 1997 to 2005. In 2005, he resigned from his role as the leader of the National Front. He said in interviews that his children were being shunned at school due to his activities. He also cited the harassment by left-wing anti-NZNF groups as a factor in his departure.

=== Right Wing Resistance ===
In 2009, Chapman founded the Right Wing Resistance, a neo-Nazi group, in Christchurch with a group of white nationalists. Chapman reportedly knighted the members with a sword after they recited a pledge. The group's insignia was a skull over a Wolfsangel, with the notation "NA 14". Its introduction to the New Zealand public was its Christchurch street patrols in October 2009, which appeared to target Polynesian youths. RWR members engaged in street patrols in New Brighton with the stated purpose of preventing vandalism by youth street gangs. The mayor of Christchurch denounced their vigilante behaviour. Its street patrols included from 5 to 15 members, who had shaved heads. Also in October 2009, Chapman organized a rally at the Wellington cenotaph.

The group attempted to recruit further members in Auckland. Press coverage resulted from distributions of flyers comparing immigration to an invasion, which were called "despicable" by the Race Relations Commissioner. It also helped organise protests and other street activities alongside the National Front.

During the 2011 general election campaign, members of the group disrupted a candidate's election meeting in Christchurch appearing in military-style clothing. They stated that they would protest at polling booths throughout New Zealand on election day; however, this did not happen.

After the March 2019 Christchurch mosque shootings Chapman said he was no longer involved with this group.

Right Wing Resistance was reported in November 2019 to have chapters in Australia, Sweden and Scotland. There is an Australian far-right extremist group called Right Wing Resistance Australia, said to have "international connections".

=== Survive Club ===
Chapman founded and led the Survive Club, a survivalist group that denied being a militia and having any racist ties despite the histories of some of its members.

== Election results ==
2004 Christchurch mayoral election
Party	Candidate	Votes	%	±%
Christchurch 2021	Garry Moore	61,170	69.70	+27.15
Independent	Aaron Keown	11,476	13.08	+9.09
Independent	Jamie Gough	7,200	8.20	
Independent	Bob Nimmo	2,378	2.71	
National Front	Kyle Chapman	1,665	1.90	
Independent	Paul Telfer	1,560	1.78	+1.51
Independent	Blair Anderson	823	0.94	
Anti-Capitalist Alliance	Sam Kingi	719	0.82	
Communist League	Annalucia Vermunt	395	0.45	+0.12
Independent	Michael Hansen	372	0.42	+0.24
Informal votes		255		
Rejected ballots		3,344	3.67	
Majority		49,694	56.63	
Turnout		91,102	38.61	−9.71

2007 Christchurch mayoral election
Party	Candidate	Votes	%	±%
Independent	Bob Parker	47,033	45.44	
Christchurch 2021	Megan Woods	32,821	31.71	
Christchurch City Vision	Jo Giles	14,454	13.96	
Independent	Mark Ross	4,505	4.35	
Independent	Peter Wakeman	1,868	1.80	
Independent	Blair Anderson	898	0.87	−0.07
Workers Party	Byron Clark	720	0.70	
National Democrats	Kyle Chapman	680	0.66	−1.24
Independent	Paul Telfer	295	0.29	−1.49
Independent	Michael Hansen	228	0.22	−0.20
Informal votes		229	0.22	−0.06
Rejected ballots		1,544	1.47	-2.20
Majority		14,212	13.73	−42.90

2013 Christchurch mayoral election
Party	Candidate	Votes	%	±%
One City Together	Lianne Dalziel	72,600	71.26	
Independent	Paul Lonsdale	22,855	22.43	
Independent	Victor Cattermole	1,025	1.01	
	Hugo Kristinsson	988	0.97	
Independent	Rik Tindall	880	0.86	−0.15
Independent	Brad Maxwell	819	0.80	+0.00
Independent	Sammy Harris	585	0.57	
The Resistance Party	Kyle Chapman	503	0.49	
Another Mildgreen Initiative	Blair Anderson	480	0.47	−0.19
Independent	Robin McCarthy	396	0.39	
Independent	Peter Wakeman	391	0.38	+0.17
Economic Euthenics	Michael Hansen	364	0.36	+0.23
Informal votes		201	0.19	
Rejected ballots		1,364	1.32	
Majority		49,745	48.82	
Turnout		103,250		
