= 1998 Christchurch mayoral election =

New Zealand mayoral election

- 10 October 1998
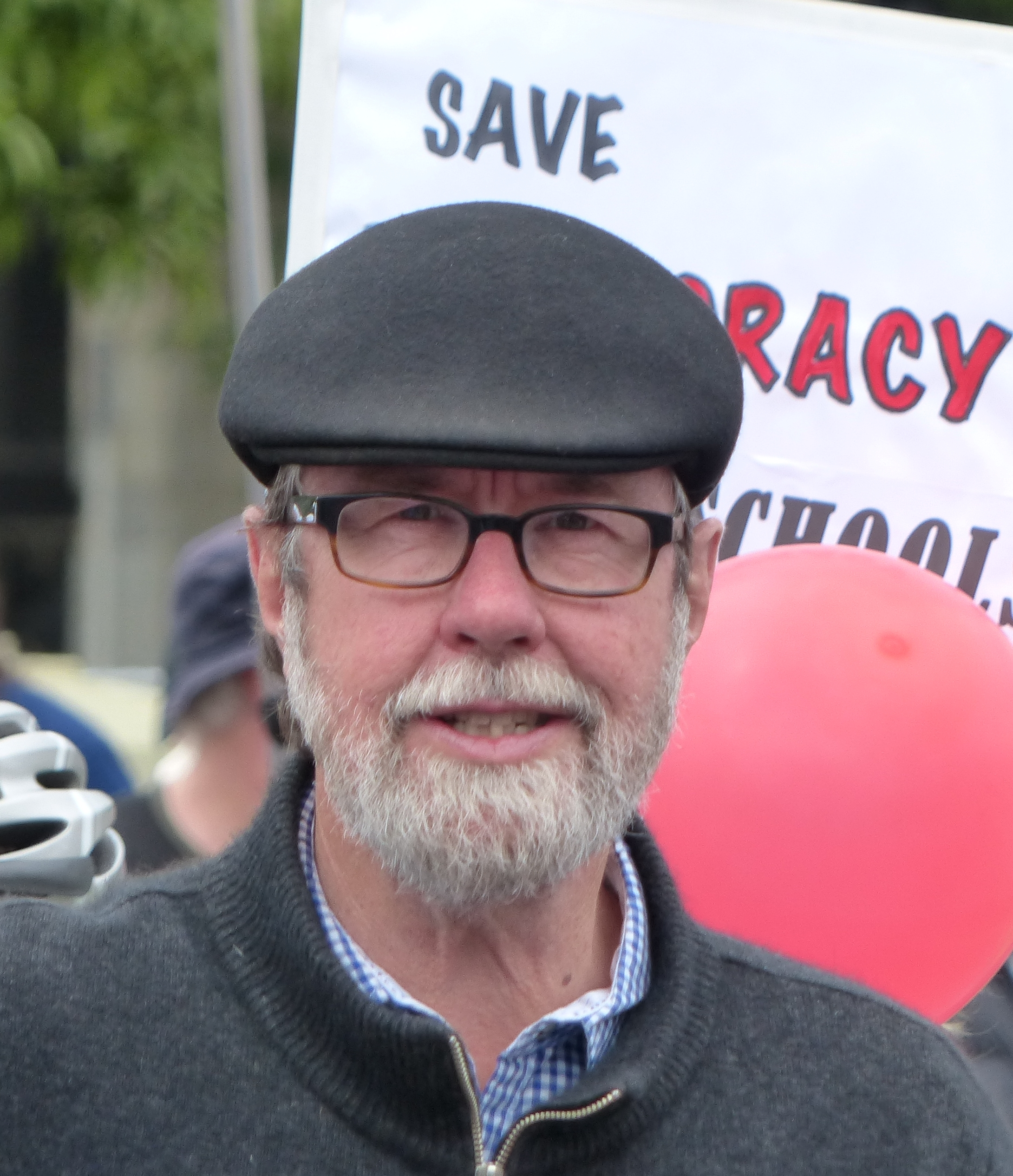

Candidate	Garry Moore	Morgan Fahey	Margaret Murray
Party	Christchurch 2021	Independent	Citizens'
Popular vote	37,377	29,321	15,444
Percentage	31.90	25.03	13.18
Mayor before election
Vicki Buck
Elected mayor
Garry Moore

The 1998 Christchurch mayoral election was part of the New Zealand local elections of that year. Garry Moore of the centre-left Christchurch 2021 ticket was elected over thirteen other candidates, and replaced Vicki Buck as Mayor.

== Results ==
The final results were as follows

1998 Christchurch mayoral election
Party	Candidate	Votes	%	±%
Christchurch 2021	Garry Moore	37,377	31.90	
Independent	Morgan Fahey	29,321	25.03	
Citizens'	Margaret Murray	15,444	13.18	
Independent	Gordon Freeman	12,522	10.69	
Pick the Berry Team	Graham Berry	8,948	7.64	
Making it Happen For You	Derek Anderson	6,205	5.30	
Legalise Cannabis	Kevin O'Connell	1,517	1.29	
Save Assets Spend Wisely	Peter Wakeman	904	0.77	
Independent	Bill Greenwood	776	0.66	
Natural Law	Carolyn Drake	635	0.54	
The Black Lodge	Graham Fraser	574	0.49	
Communist League	Ruth Gray	549	0.47	−0.15
One Nation	Paul Telfer	361	0.31	−0.73
Economic Euthenics	Tubby Hansen	207	0.18	−0.30
Informal votes		2,050	1.85	−0.07
Majority		8,056	6.87	
Turnout		115,340		
