= Poto Williams =

New Zealand politician (born 1962)

The Honourable Poto Williams MP
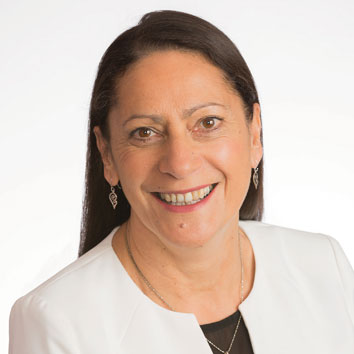
- Williams in 2020

14th Minister of Conservation
- In office 14 June 2022 – 1 February 2023
- Prime Minister: Jacinda Ardern; Chris Hipkins
- Preceded by: Kiri Allan
- Succeeded by: Willow-Jean Prime

8th Minister for Building and Construction
- In office 6 November 2020 – 14 June 2022
- Prime Minister: Jacinda Ardern
- Preceded by: Jenny Salesa
- Succeeded by: Megan Woods

40th Minister of Police
- In office 6 November 2020 – 14 June 2022
- Prime Minister: Jacinda Ardern
- Preceded by: Stuart Nash
- Succeeded by: Chris Hipkins

9th Minister for the Community and Voluntary Sector
- In office 3 July 2019 – 6 November 2020
- Prime Minister: Jacinda Ardern
- Preceded by: Peeni Henare
- Succeeded by: Priyanca Radhakrishnan

Assistant Speaker of the New Zealand House of Representatives
- In office 8 November 2017 – 3 July 2019
- Preceded by: Lindsay Tisch
- Succeeded by: Ruth Dyson

Member of the New Zealand Parliament for Christchurch East
- In office 28 January 2014 – 14 October 2023
- Preceded by: Lianne Dalziel
- Succeeded by: Reuben Davidson
- Majority: 17,336

Personal details
- Born: 7 January 1962 (age 64) Wellington, New Zealand
- Party: Labour
- Education: Southern Cross University

Munokoa Poto Williams MP (born 7 January 1962) is a New Zealand Labour Party politician and former member of Parliament. She was elected in a 2013 by-election and served as Minister of Conservation and Minister for Disability Issues in the Sixth Labour Government.

== Early life and education ==
Williams is of Cook Island descent. Her parents, Nahora and Marion Williams, migrated to New Zealand in the 1950s. She was born in Wellington and grew up in Auckland, where she attended Beresford Street School and Auckland Girls' Grammar. Williams graduated from Southern Cross University in Australia with an MBA.

== Professional career ==
Williams has a background working on family and sexual violence issues. She has worked for the Ministry of Education, BirthRight, Healthcare NZ and disability agencies. She has served as a member of the Community Child Protection Review Panel, was involved in the Waitakere Community Law Service and Community Waitakere, and was part of the Living Wage Campaign and the LIFEWISE Big Sleepout.

She moved from Auckland to the Christchurch suburb of New Brighton in January 2013 to take up a position as regional manager of the St John of God Hauora Trust but resigned from that role to run for Parliament later that year.

== Political career ==
New Zealand Parliament
Years	Term	Electorate	List	Party
2013–2014	50th	Christchurch East		Labour
2014–2017	51st	Christchurch East	28	Labour
2017–2020	52nd	Christchurch East	25	Labour
2020–2023	53rd	Christchurch East	21	Labour

Christchurch East MP Lianne Dalziel resigned in October 2013 to contest the Christchurch mayoralty, triggering a by-election. Williams won selection as Labour's candidate over five other candidates including future Christchurch city councillor Deon Swiggs and James Caygill (son of former Labour Finance Minister David Caygill). She convincingly defeated National's candidate Matt Doocey, securing 61 per cent of the vote. On 28 January 2014, Williams was sworn in as a member of the House of Representatives for the first time.

Williams held her electorate over National candidate Jo Hayes by 4,073 votes in the 2014 general election. She defeated Hayes again in 2017, by 7,480 votes, and new National candidate Lincoln Platt in 2020 by 17,336 votes.

=== Opposition, 2013–2017 ===
In her first year as an MP, Williams was appointed to the Health Committee and was Labour's associate spokesperson for social development, the community and voluntary sector, and housing (Christchurch).

After the election she nominated Andrew Little to succeed David Cunliffe as Labour leader. In the 2014–2017 term, Williams served on the Health and Social Services committees and was Labour's spokesperson on disability issues and the community and voluntary sector. She became Labour's junior whip when Jacinda Ardern became leader in September 2017.

=== Sixth Labour Government, 2017–2023 ===
On 19 October 2017, a Labour-led coalition government was formed with support from New Zealand First and the Green parties. Williams was nominated and elected an Assistant Speaker of the New Zealand House of Representatives. The National Party challenged her nomination for the office because Williams had not been sworn in as a member of Parliament for that term yet. Speaker Trevor Mallard dismissed the challenges because it is not a requirement for members of Parliament to be sworn in to be nominated as a presiding officer.

Following a cabinet reshuffle in late June 2019, Williams was appointed as a minister outside Cabinet, becoming Minister for the Community and Voluntary Sector as well as an Associate Minister for Greater Christchurch Regeneration, Social Development and Immigration. When Labour was returned to government in the 2020 general election, she was transferred into the roles of Minister of Police and Minister for Building and Construction and also became an associate minister in the children and public housing portfolios.

Williams' appointment as police minister came as a surprise to some commentators as she was seen to be a contrast with her predecessor, Stuart Nash. Through 2022, Williams was under pressure in the role as a surge of gang activity caused conflict between the Tribesmen and Killer Beez gangs in Auckland. Prime Minister Jacinda Ardern acknowledged that "focus" in the police portfolio had been lost and, in a reshuffle on 13 June 2022, reassigned Willilams to be Minister of Conservation and Minister for Disability Issues.

On 13 December 2022, Williams announced that she would not be contesting the 2023 New Zealand general election and would step down at the end of the 2020–2023 term. While describing her job as an MP and Cabinet as an "extraordinary and amazing privilege," Williams stated that the Christchurch East electorate needed "someone with fresh eyes and fresh energy." On 10 February 2023, Williams was granted retention of the title "The Honourable" for life, in recognition of her term as a member of the Executive Council.

== Political positions ==
In May 2017, Williams suggested removing the presumption of innocence afforded to alleged perpetrators of sexual assault. She voted in favour of the Abortion Legislation Bill in March 2020 and against the End of Life Choice Bill in December 2019.

New Zealand Parliament
Preceded by Lianne Dalziel	Member of Parliament for Christchurch East; 2013–present	Incumbent
Political offices
New title	Minister for Disability Issues; 2022–2023	Succeeded by Priyanca Radhakrishnan
Preceded by Kiri Allan	Minister of Conservation; 2022–2023	Succeeded by Willow-Jean Prime
Preceded by Jenny Salesa	Minister for Building and Construction; 2020–2022	Succeeded by Megan Woods
Preceded by Stuart Nash	Minister of Police; 2020–2022	Succeeded by Chris Hipkins
Preceded by Peeni Henare	Minister for the Community and Voluntary Sector; 2019–2020	Succeeded by Priyanca Radhakrishnan
