= Megan Woods =

New Zealand politician

The Honourable Megan Woods MP
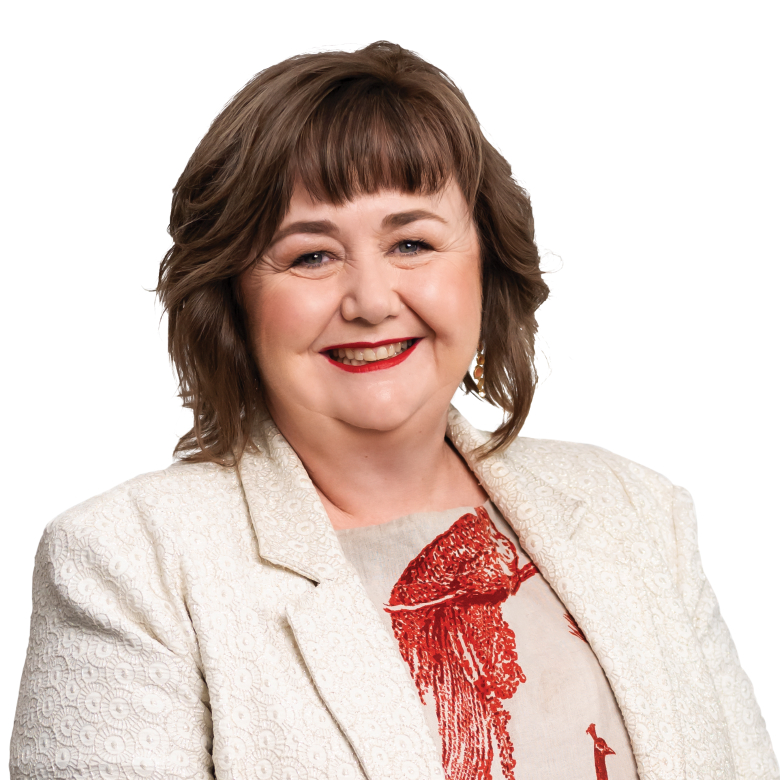
- Woods in 2023

17th Minister of Energy and Resources
- In office 26 October 2017 – 27 November 2023
- Prime Minister: Jacinda Ardern; Chris Hipkins
- Preceded by: Judith Collins
- Succeeded by: Simeon Brown

28th Minister of Housing
- In office 27 June 2019 – 27 November 2023
- Prime Minister: Jacinda Ardern; Chris Hipkins
- Preceded by: Phil Twyford
- Succeeded by: Chris Bishop

9th Minister for Building and Construction
- In office 14 June 2022 – 27 November 2023
- Prime Minister: Jacinda Ardern; Chris Hipkins
- Preceded by: Poto Williams
- Succeeded by: Chris Penk

5th Minister for Infrastructure
- In office 1 February 2023 – 27 November 2023
- Prime Minister: Chris Hipkins
- Preceded by: Grant Robertson
- Succeeded by: Chris Bishop

Minister for Economic Development (Acting)
- In office 28 March 2023 – 12 April 2023
- Prime Minister: Chris Hipkins
- Preceded by: Stuart Nash
- Succeeded by: Barbara Edmonds

Minister of Forestry (Acting)
- In office 28 March 2023 – 12 April 2023
- Prime Minister: Chris Hipkins
- Preceded by: Stuart Nash
- Succeeded by: Peeni Henare

Minister of Police (Acting)
- In office 15 March 2023 – 20 March 2023
- Prime Minister: Chris Hipkins
- Preceded by: Stuart Nash
- Succeeded by: Ginny Andersen

26th Minister for Research, Science and Innovation
- In office 26 October 2017 – 14 June 2022
- Prime Minister: Jacinda Ardern
- Preceded by: Paul Goldsmith
- Succeeded by: Ayesha Verrall

Minister for Greater Christchurch Regeneration
- In office 26 October 2017 – 6 November 2020
- Prime Minister: Jacinda Ardern
- Preceded by: Nicky Wagner
- Succeeded by: Office abolished

Minister for Government Digital Services
- In office 26 August 2018 – 28 June 2019
- Prime Minister: Jacinda Ardern
- Preceded by: Clare Curran
- Succeeded by: Kris Faafoi

Member of the New Zealand Parliament for Wigram
- Incumbent
- Assumed office 26 November 2011
- Preceded by: Jim Anderton
- Majority: 14,770

Personal details
- Born: 4 November 1973 (age 53)
- Party: Labour (since 2007)
- Other political affiliations: Progressive Party (1999–2007)
- Website: Profile on Labour website

Academic background
- Education: University of Canterbury
- Thesis: Integrating the nation: Gendering Maori urbanisation and integration, 1942–1969 (2002)
- Doctoral advisor: Katie Pickles

Megan Cherie Woods (born 4 November 1973) is a New Zealand Labour Party politician who served as a Cabinet minister in the Sixth Labour Government and has served as member of Parliament for Wigram since 2011.

== Early life ==
Woods was born and grew up in Wigram, Christchurch. She attended high school at Catholic Cathedral College. She obtained a master's degree from the University of Canterbury with her thesis being titled Re/producing the nation : women making identity in New Zealand, 1906–1925. She went on to obtain a PhD in history again at the University of Canterbury with a thesis titled Integrating the nation: Gendering Maori urbanisation and integration, 1942–1969.

== Professional life ==
Woods was a business manager for Crop & Food Research (2005–08) and its successor organisation Plant and Food Research (2008), based at Lincoln.

== Political career ==
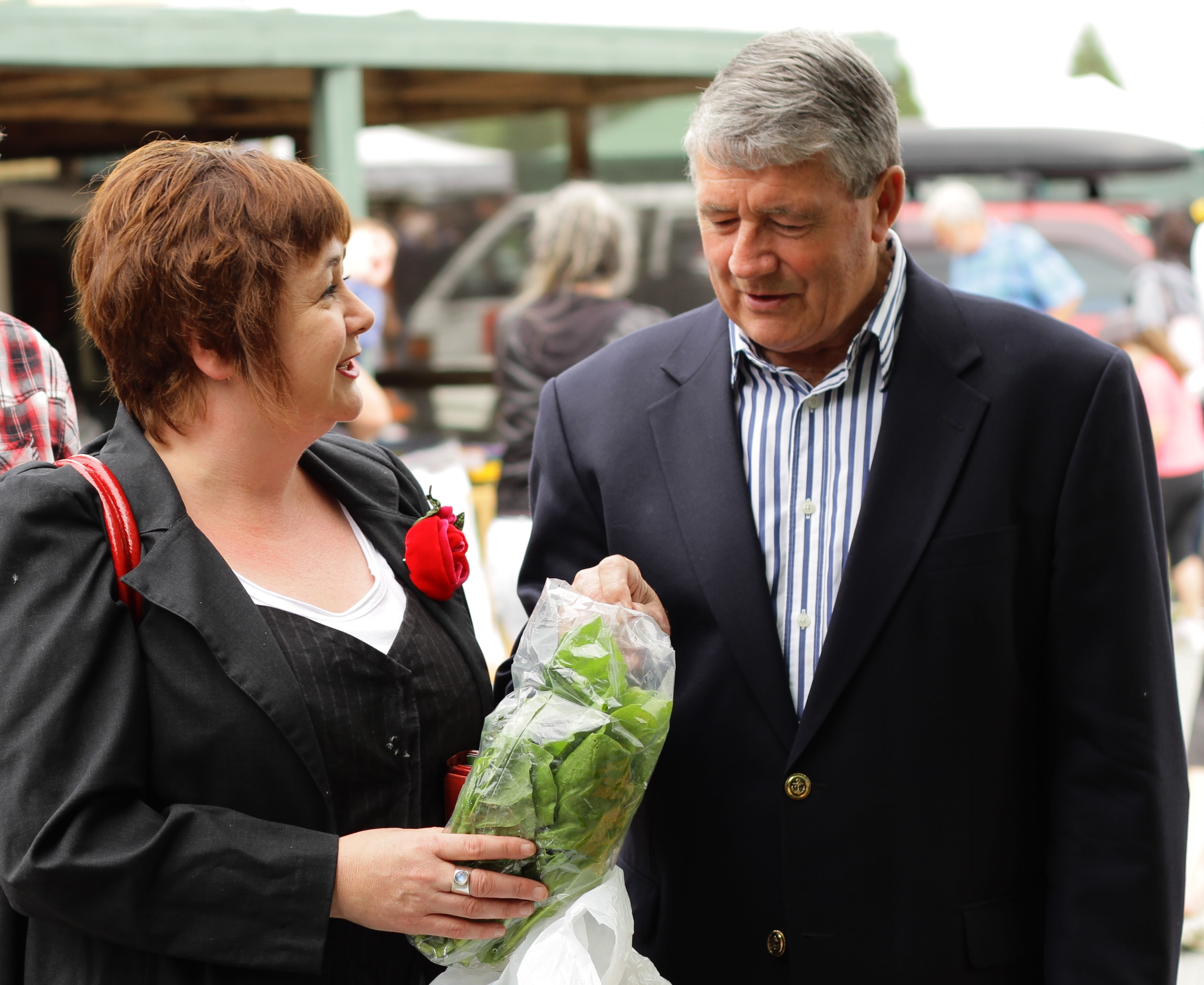
Woods and Anderton at the Riccarton Market

Woods was a member of the Alliance Party from 1999 until 2002, when she joined the breakaway Progressive Party. She was involved in several of Jim Anderton's re-election campaigns. She contested the Christchurch Central electorate in the 2005 general election and came fourth, receiving 1077 votes (3.2% of the electorate votes). She was placed fourth on the Progressive party list. As the party obtained only 1.2% of the party vote, she did not enter Parliament that year.

She was a member of the Spreydon-Heathcote community board in Christchurch from 2004 to 2007.

Woods joined the Labour Party in 2007. In the same year, she contested the Christchurch mayoralty for the centre-left Christchurch 2021 group, receiving 32,821 votes and coming second against Bob Parker (47,033 votes), but beating Jo Giles (14,454 votes) in the election contested by ten candidates. She did not contest the 2008 general election or the 2010 mayoral election.

Woods was selected as the Labour candidate for the 2011 election in the Wigram electorate. She succeeded Jim Anderton, who had announced that he would retire either after winning the Christchurch mayoralty (he was unsuccessful) or at the end of the term of the 49th Parliament in November 2011. Woods was a key member of Anderton's campaign committee, along with key Progressive Party members like Jeanette Lawrence and Liz Maunsell, and Labour activists such as campaign manager Tony Milne, Ben Ross and Liana Foster. Until the 2010 Canterbury earthquake, Anderton was leading in the opinion polls, and winning the mayoralty would have caused a by-election in the Wigram electorate. The earthquake resulted in a mood swing in Christchurch, and Anderton lost against Bob Parker. Anderton remained an MP until the end of the term of the 49th Parliament, and Woods won in the 2011 general election in the Wigram electorate.

=== Member of Parliament ===
New Zealand Parliament
Years	Term	Electorate	List	Party
2011–2014	50th	Wigram	47	Labour
2014–2017	51st	Wigram	20	Labour
2017–2020	52nd	Wigram	6	Labour
2020–2023	53rd	Wigram	5	Labour
2023–2026	54th	Wigram	5	Labour
2026–present	55th	List	5	Labour

=== In opposition: 2011–2017 ===
Woods's candidacy, which began in late 2010, was centred on job creation in her electorate. She stated in her Labour selection speech that "Growing up here in the 1980s, I watched people lose their jobs. I saw workplaces like the Addington Workshops shut their doors forever. Now I am 36 years old and am watching jobs disappear from our communities again." Woods also cited the rising cost of living for everyday people as a major concern.

During the 2011 election, Woods won the seat with 45.11% of the vote and a majority of 1,500 votes. Woods won re-election in the 2014 election with an increased majority.

While in opposition Woods was Labour Party's spokesperson for the Environment and Climate Change and has served prior as the Party's spokesperson for Tertiary Education and associate spokesperson for Science and Innovation.

Following the ratification of the Paris Agreement by the United States and China, on 5 September 2016 Woods was critical of the National Governments slow progress towards ratifying.

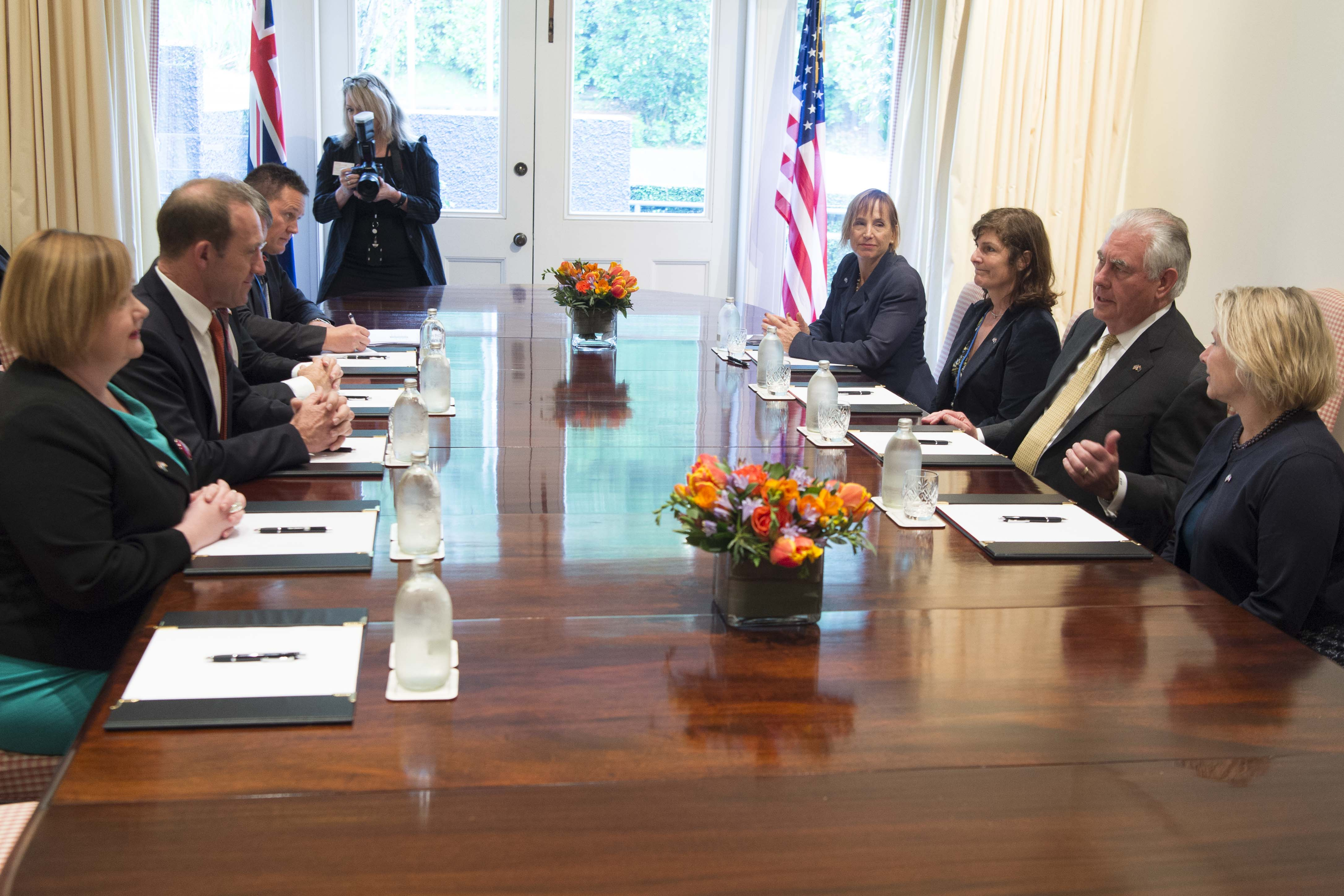
Woods and Andrew Little meet with Secretary of State Tillerson

Commenting on the 2016 United States Presidential Election, Woods expressed support for Hillary Clinton's candidacy, calling her “experienced” and “ready”.

On 6 June 2017, Woods met with United States Secretary of State Rex Tillerson as part of the Oppositions meeting with Tillerson as Spokesperson for Climate Change during their trip to New Zealand.

During the 2017 general election, Woods retained Wigram for Labour by a margin of 4,594 votes.

=== In government: 2017–2023 ===
Woods was elected as a Cabinet Minister by the Labour Party caucus following Labour's formation of a coalition government with New Zealand First and the Greens. As of 2017, Woods was the Minister of Energy and Resources. On 12 April, Woods announced that the Government would halt future gas and oil exploration but clarified that the existing 22 contracts would be allowed to continue.

On 27 June 2019, in Prime Minister Jacinda Ardern's first major reshuffle of the coalition government, Woods was appointed Minister of Housing, replacing Phil Twyford.

On 19 June 2020, Woods was given joint responsibility with Air Commodore Darryn Webb for overseeing isolation and quarantine facilities for travellers entering New Zealand, as part of the government's response to the COVID-19 pandemic.

During the 2020 general election, Woods served as the Labour Party's campaign chairperson. She retained the seat of Wigram by a final margin of 14,770 votes. In early November 2020, she retained her ministerial portfolios of Housing, Energy and Resources, and Research, Science and Innovation, while picking up the position of Associate Minister of Finance.

In late February 2021, Woods defended the Government's Progressive Home Ownership Scheme, which had cost NZ$17 million but only resettled 12 families in the last seven months. In response, National's housing spokesperson Nicola Willis described the programme as a failure and contended that Woods was out of touch.

On 19 October 2021, Woods announced a new bipartisan housing policy to address the housing crisis. Announced with Environment Minister David Parker and National Party leader Judith Collins, the Resource Management (Enabling Housing Supply and Other Matters) Amendment Bill would allow for 105,500 homes to be built in under a decade. The changes to planning rules would allow for more medium-density housing.

On 16 November 2022, following figures released from the Ministry for the Environment based on the National Party's climate policies, Woods, as Labour climate change spokesperson, was sceptical of their plans. Woods accused National of “greenwashing” and "denying climate change", saying that “not content with wallowing in a fiscal Bermuda Triangle, they’re also falling down a carbon black hole”. Woods highlighted National's opposition to policies such as the clean car discount, public transport industries, and removing coal boilers as examples. Woods also called National Party leader Christopher Luxon's plan to use the ocean as a carbon sink as pseudoscience. National rejected the claims as a “beat-up” while highlighting their support for net zero 2050.

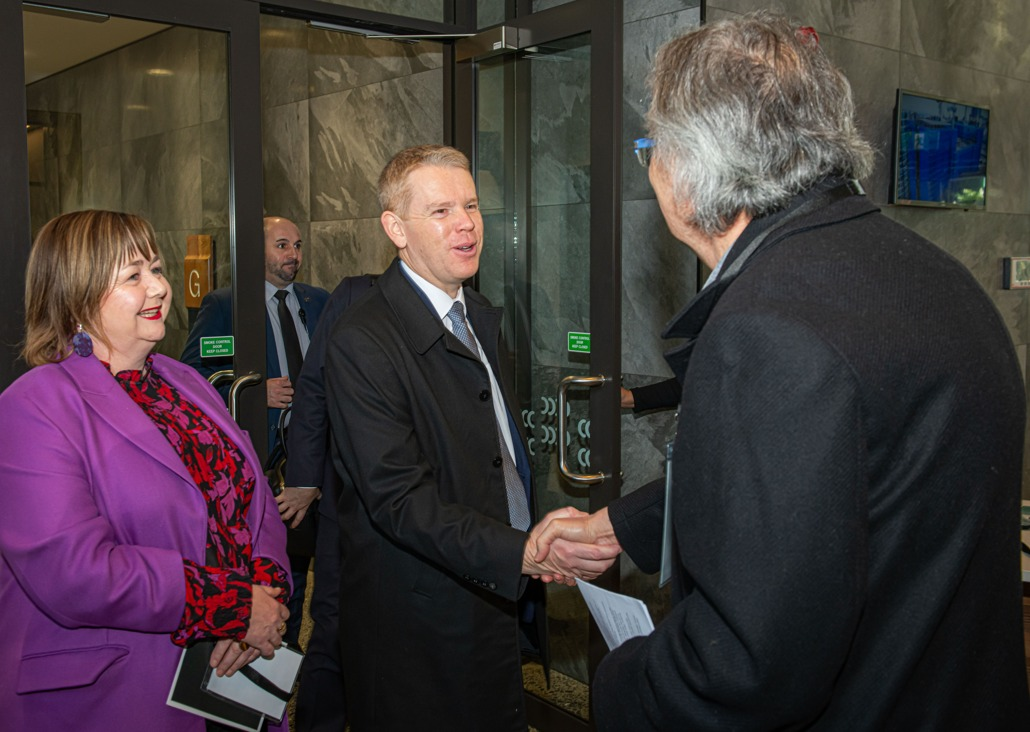
Woods and Prime Minister Chris Hipkins at the opening of Te Mātāwai

During the 2023 Labour Party Leadership Election following Jacinda Ardern's 19 January 2023 resignation, Woods was considered to be a prospective candidate among media outlets, with commentators noting Woods’ performance and competence under pressure in her portfolios. Newsroom national affairs editor, Sam Sachdeva, and senior political reporter, Marc Daalder, considered Woods a dark horse and a jack of all trades, however, Felix Desmarias of 1News considered Minister of Housing a challenging role to step into Prime Minister from. Woods would later confirm she would not run in the leadership election after initially not ruling in or out her candidacy. She would instead rise in cabinet and party rankings.

On 3 August 2023, joined with Prime Minister Chris Hipkins, Woods opened Te Mātāwai, the largest public housing development delivered by the Sixth Labour Government. Featuring 276 apartments across three towers, the complex delivered by Kāinga Ora mixes private market rentals and public housing. Speaking on the combined public/private housing, which was a first at a Kāinga Ora development, Woods said the intent was to ensure a “diverse and mixed community”.

During the 2023 general election campaign, Woods served as Labour's campaign chairperson for a second time. In early June 2023, she attracted media attention after publishing a Twitter post likening the opposition National Party's proposal to bring back the NZ$5 prescription fee to the dystopian novel and TV show The Handmaid's Tale. In response, National's deputy leader Willis stated she was offended by Woods' post and accused the Labour Government of "going into the gutter" and making "ridiculous, baseless attacks."

By the conclusion of the Sixth Labour Government following the 2023 general election Woods had held eleven ministerial positions and one associate ministerial role. Woods gained a reputation as a fixer and member of Labour's Kitchen Cabinet, with National's Judith Collins saying of Woods that she is “not at all incapable—she is capable”. She would retain the seat of Wigram at the 2023 general election and remain on Labour's front bench.

=== In opposition, 2023–present ===
During the 2023 election held on 14 October, Woods was re-elected in Wigram by a margin of 1,179 votes. On 5 December 2023, she was granted retention of the title The Honourable, in recognition of her term as a member of the Executive Council.

In late November 2023, Woods became spokesperson for climate change, energy, resources and associate finance in the Shadow Cabinet of Chris Hipkins.

After the National decision in government to back out of the bipartisan agreement on housing densification agreed to in 2021 with Woods as Minister of Housing, Woods was highly critical. On 20 June 2024, Woods called the decision an “incredibly damaging moment” in New Zealand politics and said, "we do have to be grown-ups and work together on some of the stuff that is very long term”.

In a shadow cabinet reshuffle in March 2025, Woods gained the manufacturing and industry portfolio but lost the climate change portfolio.

On 3 August 2025, she announced that she would not seek Labour's candidacy in the Wigram electorate at the 2026 New Zealand general election and would instead run as a list candidate. Commenting on her decision she said that her time as Wigram MP was "both humbling and the honour of a lifetime". She highlighted the Christchurch earthquake recovery, the COVID-19 pandemic, and the Christchurch mosque shootings as key challenges she faced as Wigram MP. During the 2026 election, Woods was ranked fifth on the Labour Party list. Based on preliminary results, she was re-elected to Parliament on the Labour Party list.

New Zealand Parliament
Preceded by Jim Anderton	Member of Parliament for Wigram; 2011–present	Incumbent
Political offices
Preceded by Nicky Wagner	Minister for Greater Canterbury Regeneration; 2017–2020	Ministerial post abolished
Preceded by Paul Goldsmith	Minister for Research, Science and Innovation; 2017–2022	Succeeded by Ayesha Verrall
Preceded by Judith Collins	Minister of Energy and Resources; 2017–2023	Succeeded by Simeon Brown
Preceded by Phil Twyford	Minister of Housing; 2019–2023	Succeeded by Chris Bishop
Preceded by Poto Williams	Minister for Building and Construction; 2022–2023	Succeeded by Chris Penk
Preceded by Grant Robertson	Minister for Infrastructure; 2023	Succeeded by Chris Bishop
