= 2007 Christchurch mayoral election =

New Zealand mayoral election

- 13 October 2007
- Turnout: 102,495 (40.81%)
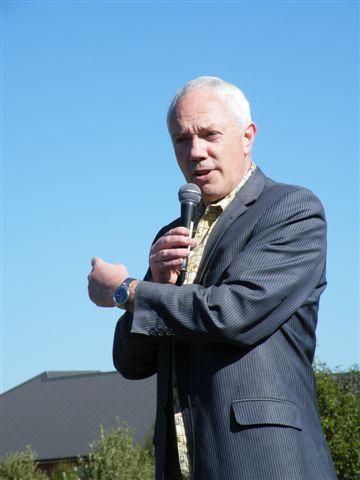

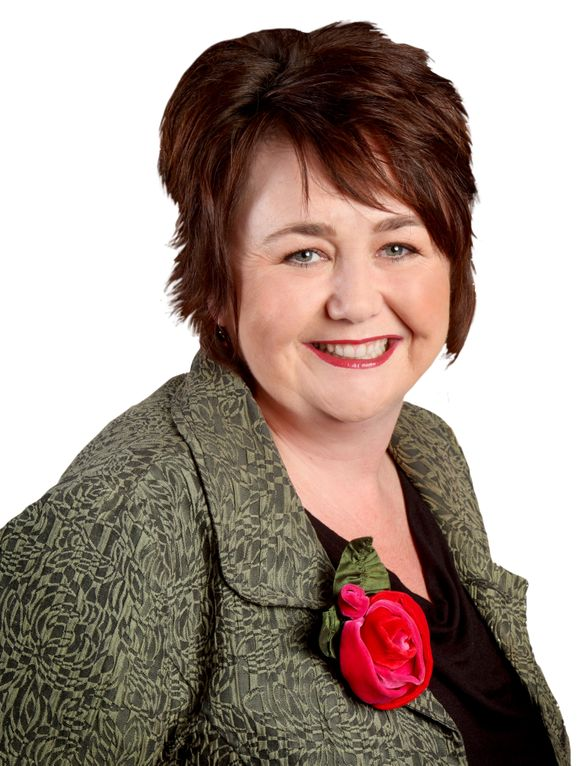

Candidate	Bob Parker	Megan Woods	Jo Giles
Party	Independent	Christchurch 2021	City Vision
Popular vote	47,033	32,821	14,454
Percentage	45.44	31.71	13.96
Mayor before election
Garry Moore
Elected mayor
Bob Parker

The 2007 Christchurch mayoral election was part of the 2007 New Zealand local elections. On 13 October of that year, elections were held for the Mayor of Christchurch plus other local government roles. Incumbent Garry Moore retired in 2007 after nine years in the office. Bob Parker, previously mayor of Banks Peninsula, beat the Christchurch 2021 representative, Megan Woods, with a majority of 14,212 votes (13.73%). Media personality Jo Giles, who had previously contested the Ilam electorate for the ACT Party for Parliament, came a distant third. A further seven candidate contested the election. Parker's campaign was supported by businessman and Ngāi Tahu board member Nuk Korako, who himself was elected to the House of Representatives in 2014 for the National Party.

== Results ==
2007 Christchurch mayoral election
Party	Candidate	Votes	%	±%
Independent	Bob Parker	47,033	45.44	
Christchurch 2021	Megan Woods	32,821	31.71	
Christchurch City Vision	Jo Giles	14,454	13.96	
Independent	Mark Ross	4,505	4.35	
Independent	Peter Wakeman	1,868	1.80	
Independent	Blair Anderson	898	0.87	−0.07
Workers Party	Byron Clark	720	0.70	
National Front	Kyle Chapman	680	0.66	−1.24
Independent	Paul Telfer	295	0.29	−1.49
Independent	Tubby Hansen	228	0.22	−0.20
Informal votes		229	0.22	−0.06
Rejected ballots		1,544	1.47	-2.20
Majority		14,212	13.73	−42.90

== Voting statistics ==
Participation in local elections has been falling for years. In the 2007 local election, 40.81% of registered voters cast their vote, some two percentage points higher than in 2004. The following table shows the voting statistics since the 1989 local elections:

	1989	1992	1995	1998	2001	2004	2007
Electors on rolls	200,915	208,533	215,621	223,832	227,793	235,930	251,173
Voters	121,680	105,982	107,450	116,511	110,068	91,027	102,495
Percentage voted	60.56%	50.82%	49.83%	52.05%	48.32%	38.58%	40.81%
