= Tony Marryatt =

New Zealand local government executive (born 1966)

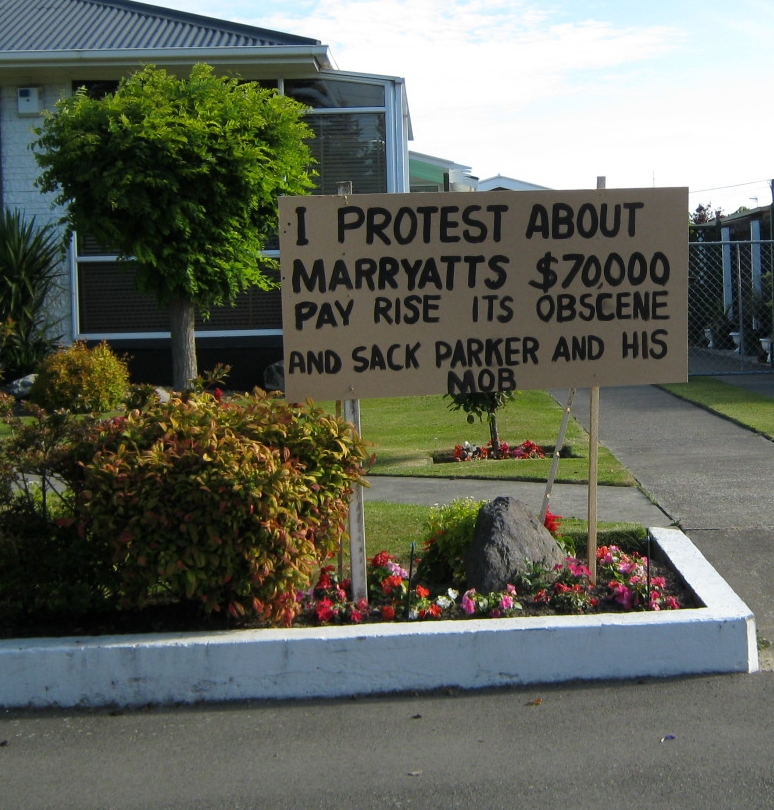
Protest sign about Marryatt's 2011 pay rise

Tony Marryatt (born 1966) is a senior manager employed by local government in New Zealand. Between 2007 and 2013, he was the chief executive officer (CEO) of Christchurch City Council, succeeding Lesley McTurk. He lost his position over the city council being stripped of its building consent accreditation.

== Early life ==
Marryatt was born in 1966.

== Professional career ==
Marryatt has spent his entire career working for local government. His first employment was with Raglan County Council, followed by Kapiti Borough Council, and Wairoa District Council. At North Shore City Council, he was responsible for financial management as part of corporate services. He then became chief executive of Southland District Council. He was chief executive of Hamilton City Council from 1995 to 2007.

Marryatt's predecessor at Christchurch City Council, Dr Lesley McTurk, resigned in January 2007 to take up the CEO-role at Housing New Zealand. Marryatt's appointment as CEO in Christchurch was announced by Mayor Garry Moore on 15 February 2007.

== Controversy ==
Maryatt's local government career was dogged by controversy. He was held responsible for the loss-making Hamilton V8 Supercars event by his opponents, notably then-mayor of Hamilton David Braithwaite, who frequently clashed with Marryatt. In late 2011 he, along with the Bob Parker-led Christchurch City Council, garnered controversy for accepting a $70,000 pay rise as the council's CEO. This culminated in a protest rally attended by some 4,000 people in February 2012. In late August of that year, it emerged that Marryatt had taken a personal grievance against city councillors. Whilst the case was settled before it went to court, the city council reimbursed his legal costs, which were between NZ$10,000 to NZ$30,000. Maryatt was also condemned by the Canterbury Employers Chamber of Commerce for his decision to grant council staff an extra 11 days leave a year without first seeking approval from elected city councillors.

With effect from 8 July 2013, Christchurch City Council was stripped of its accreditation for issuing building consents. This came in the middle of the rebuild following the devastating February 2011 Christchurch earthquake. City councillors found out earlier in June through the media that International Accreditation New Zealand (IANZ) had written to the council and threatened to withdraw accreditation, with Marryatt replying "that Parker and other councillors were kept in the dark because he was confident staff were addressing issues raised by IANZ, and that the June 28 deadline would be met." A Crown manager, Doug Martin, was installed to reform the council's consenting department. Marryatt lost his job over the affair, but stayed on the payroll until November 2013 and received a total of $500,000 on departure. Parker, who had backed the controversial CEO over the years, took his share of the responsibility and decided not to stand for re-election for a third term as mayor.
