= 2010 Christchurch mayoral election =

New Zealand mayoral election

- 9 October 2010
- Turnout: 51.68%
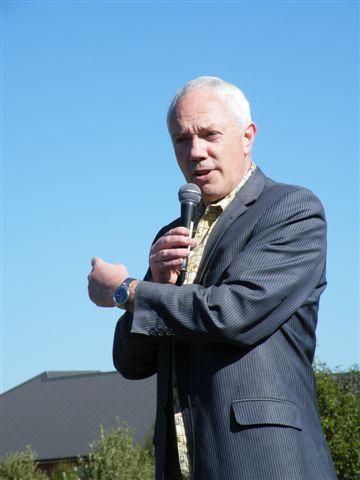

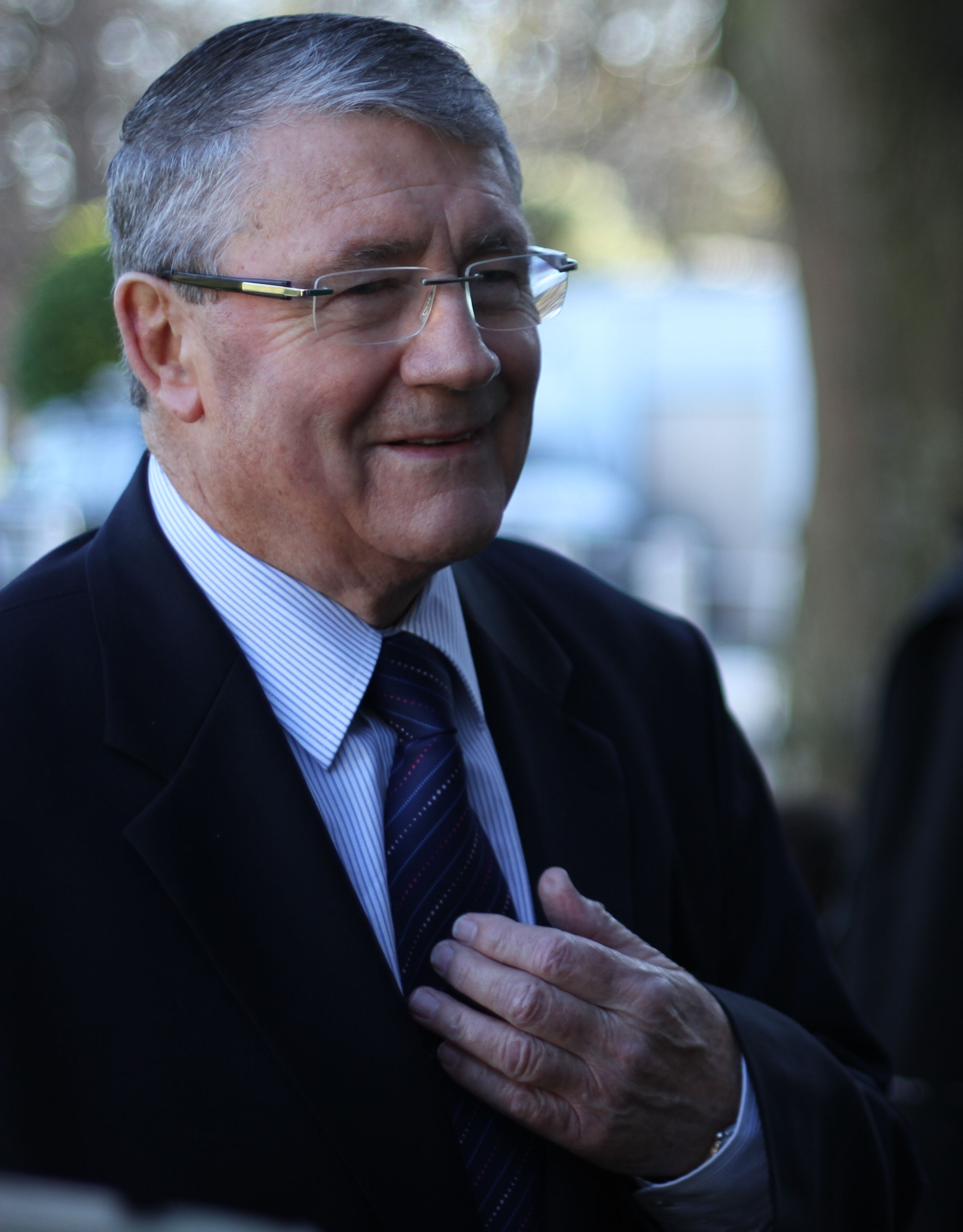
Candidate	Bob Parker	Jim Anderton
Party	Independent	Independent
Popular vote	70,193	53,604
Percentage	53.42	40.79
Mayor before election
Bob Parker
Elected mayor
Bob Parker

The 2010 Christchurch mayoral election is part of the 2010 New Zealand local elections. On 9 October 2010, elections were held for the Mayor of Christchurch plus other local government roles. Incumbent Bob Parker was re-elected.

== Local government elections ==
On 9 October 2010, elections were held for the position of mayor of Christchurch, for 13 councillors representing the 7 wards of the Christchurch City Council, for the city's community board representatives, and for the Canterbury District Health Board. This time, there were no elections for the Canterbury Regional Council, as the government, following the release of the "Creech Report", chose to appoint a panel of commissioners to replace the elected councillors. The commissioners are headed by Margaret Bazley.

Local authority elections are held throughout New Zealand triennially and are conducted by postal vote.

== Timeline ==
Nominations opened for candidates to formally register with the returning officer on 23 July 2010. Nominations closed on 20 August 2010. Voting documents were delivered on 17 September 2010.

Under section 10 of the Local Electoral Act 2001, a "general election of members of every local authority or community board must be held on the second Saturday in October in every third year" from the date the Act came into effect in 2001, meaning 9 October 2010. On election day, voting closed at 12 noon.

== Candidates ==
=== Declared candidates ===
Candidates who have publicly declared that they would contest the mayoralty are so far the incumbent Bob Parker (who announced that he would want a second term back in 2009), and Peter Wakeman.

Jim Anderton announced on 6 May that he would contest the mayoralty. In becoming successful, Jim Anderton had previously stated he would not give up his Wigram electorate seat as to avoid a by-election, citing costs associated with a by-election. However, he has now stated that he would give up his parliamentary seat if elected in order to focus on Christchurch in the aftermath of the 2010 Canterbury earthquake.

Nathan Ryan announced that he would stand as an independent candidate for the Christchurch mayoralty, as well as standing for the city council and the community board in the Hagley-Ferrymead ward. Ryan had previously contested the 2007 election.

=== Declared not to stand ===
Initially, Liz Gordon was a candidate for the Christchurch Mayoralty. Following Anderton's candidacy announcement, she confirmed that she would not be pulling out of the race. However, on 19 July she reversed her previous decision stating: "If I stayed in the race, I think it (the vote) could have ended up going to Bob Parker and that's the last thing I want". This is based on her belief that if she remained in the candidacy for mayor the left vote would be split, mostly due to her claim of polling at around 10% for the majority of the campaign. In comparison, the UMR research published in June 2010 had her polling at 4%.

Kerry Burke, former MP and speaker of the house, and lately councillor for ECan, was discussed as a likely contender. On 3 June 2010, he announced that he would back Anderton's desire for the mayoralty, and that he himself would seek election for Christchurch City Council in the Spreydon-Heathcote ward.

Before the end of 2009, Jo Kane was considering standing for the Christchurch mayoralty. She is a former deputy mayor for Waimakariri District Council, and lately councillor for ECan. Kane announced in June 2010 that she will contest the Waimakariri mayoralty. Other Waimakariri candidates include long-serving Waimakariri councillor David Ayers (also a former Deputy Mayor), current Mayor Ron Keating and Peter Wakeman, who is also contesting the Christchurch mayoralty.

== Opinion polls ==
The 4 September 2010 Canterbury earthquake can be seen as having a major impact on this mayoral election. Anderton led the two polls prior to it but has fallen behind since then. 88% of people believed that Parker had handled the response very well.

Source	Date (published)	Anderton	Parker	Others	Undecided	Margin of Error	Surveyed
UMR Research	27 May to 7 June 2010 (14 June 2010)	46%	21%	11%	22%	±5.2%	n = 500
Press	(28 August)	50%	31%	1%	18%	±4.0%	n = 600
UMR Research	(29 September 2010)	41%	55%	–	–	±5.2%	n = 361
Press	24 to 29 September 2010 (2 October 2010)	20%	36%	1%	44%	±5.2%	n = 400

== Results ==
Incumbent Bob Parker was re-elected with an increased majority.

2010 Christchurch mayoralty election
Party	Candidate	Votes	%	±%
A Positive Future	Bob Parker	70,193	53.42	+7.97
The People's Mayor	Jim Anderton	53,604	40.79	
	Nathan Ryan	1,884	1.43	
Our Water Our City	Rik Tindall	1,330	1.01	
Independent	Brad Maxwell	1,048	0.80	
Blair for Mayor	Blair Anderson	862	0.66	−0.21
	Bob Tomkins	508	0.39	
Independent	Kayne Harrison	457	0.35	
	Brian Steer	415	0.32	
	Byron Clark	309	0.24	−0.46
	Kieran Gallagher-Power	290	0.22	
peterwakeman.org	Peter Wakeman	281	0.21	−1.59
Economic Euthenics	Tubby Hansen	170	0.13	−0.09
51st State Party of NZ	Paulus Telfer	58	0.04	−0.24

== Voting statistics ==
Participation in local elections has been falling for years. In the 2010 local election, 51.68% of registered voters cast their vote, which is significantly higher than the low of 2004, and the increased interest was caused by the recent earthquake. The following table shows the voting statistics since the 1989 local elections:

	1989	1992	1995	1998	2001	2004	2007	2010
Electors on rolls	200,915	208,533	215,621	223,832	227,793	235,930	251,173	(Note: Roll data not provided)
Voters	121,680	105,982	107,450	116,511	110,068	91,027	102,495	(Note: Voter numbers not provided)
Percentage voted	60.56%	50.82%	49.83%	52.05%	48.32%	38.58%	40.81%	51.68%

Table footnotes:

== See also ==
- 2010 Auckland mayoral election
- 2010 Dunedin mayoral election
- 2010 Wellington City mayoral election
