= Jo Giles =

New Zealand TV presenter and sportswoman (1950–2011)

- Born: 29 November 1950
- Died: 22 February 2011 (aged 60); Christchurch, New Zealand
- Other name: Joanne May Hale
- Occupations: Broadcaster, sportswoman
- Employer: Canterbury Television
- Television: Shopping with Jo
- Political party: ACT New Zealand (2005)
- Children: 4

Joanne May Giles (29 November 1950 – 22 February 2011) was a New Zealand television presenter and former representative sportswoman. She represented the country in pistol shooting at the 1997 Oceanian Championships in Adelaide, and the 2000 World Cup in Sydney. She was the first New Zealand woman to ride in a totaliser race (thoroughbred racing) in New Zealand, on 15 July 1978 at Waimate, and also competed in motorsport and Rock 'n Roll competitions. Giles was later a TV presenter for the regional broadcaster Canterbury Television (CTV), with her programme "Shopping with Jo".

Giles was also a candidate for ACT New Zealand in the 2005 general election. She formed a local body political party "Christchurch City Vision" and was a mayoral candidate in the 2007 Christchurch local body election. With 14,454 votes, Giles came third after Bob Parker (47,033 votes) and Megan Woods (32,821 votes) in the election contested by ten candidates.

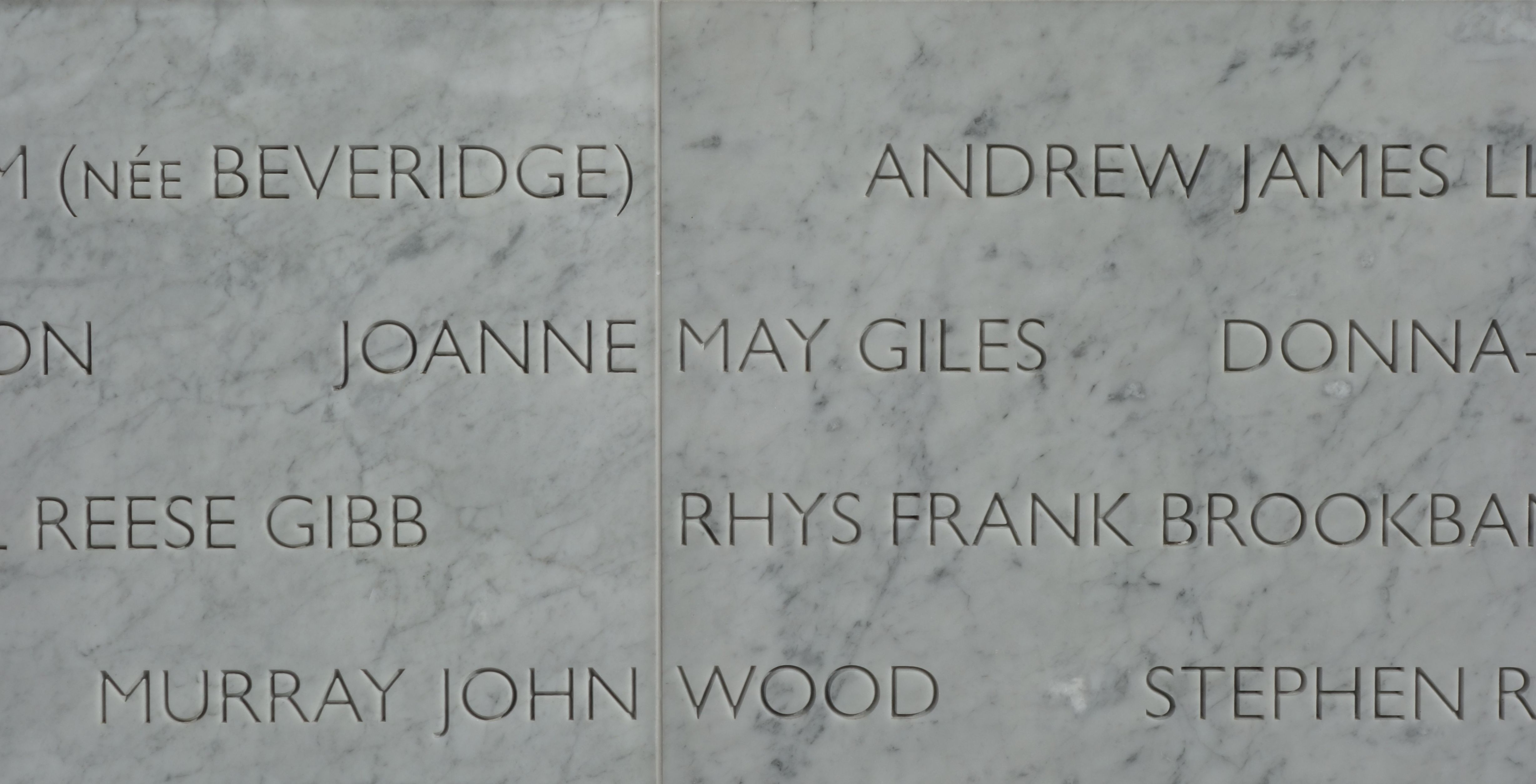
The inscription for Giles on the Canterbury Earthquake National Memorial

On 22 February 2011, Giles died in the Christchurch earthquake in the collapse of the CTV Building. She had four children.

== See also ==
- List of New Zealand television personalities
- New Zealand Women Jockeys
