= International Accreditation New Zealand =

International Accreditation New Zealand (IANZ) is the accreditation body of the Testing Laboratory Registration Council in New Zealand. It is an autonomous Crown entity established by the Testing Laboratory Registration Council Act, 1972.

IANZ is a full member of the International Laboratory Accreditation Cooperation (ILAC) and the regional body, Asia Pacific Laboratory Accreditation Cooperation (APLAC). IANZ is also a signatory to the ILAC and APLAC Mutual Recognition Arrangements.

== Competence, reliability and confidence ==
Accreditation by International Accreditation New Zealand (IANZ) is the international process for assessing and recognising the technical competence and the effective quality processes of a professional service and its staff. Laboratories, radiology services and inspection bodies displaying the IANZ Accreditation mark follow the best international technical and management systems standards, including full compliance with relevant international standards.

== Definition of accreditation ==
Accreditation means formal recognition that a conformity assessment body (e.g. laboratory or inspection body) has been independently assessed by an authoritative accreditation body in the five key areas of:

- Competence and experience of staff
- Integrity and traceability of equipment and materials
- Technical validity of methods
- Validity and suitability of results
- Compliance with appropriate management systems standards and is found to be competent to carry out its services in a professional, reliable and efficient manner

== Christchurch City Council ==
With effect from 8 July 2013, Christchurch City Council has been stripped of its accreditation for issuing building consents. This comes in the middle of a rebuild period following the devastating February 2011 Christchurch earthquake. City Councillors found out earlier in June through the media that IANZ had written to Council and threatened to withdraw accreditation, with Council's chief executive officer, Tony Marryatt, replying that mayor "Parker and other councillors were kept in the dark because he was confident staff were addressing issues raised by IANZ, and that the June 28 deadline would be met."
