= Bob Parker (mayor) =

45th Mayor of Christchurch

Sir Bob Parker KNZM
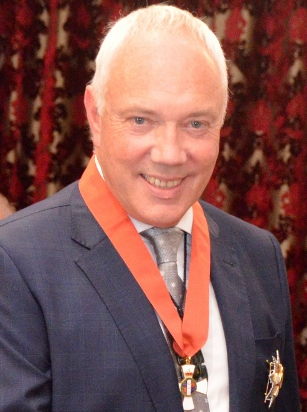
- Parker in 2014

45th Mayor of Christchurch
- In office October 2007 – October 2013
- Preceded by: Garry Moore
- Succeeded by: Lianne Dalziel

Personal details
- Born: Robert John Parker; 13 January 1953 (age 73) Christchurch, New Zealand
- Party: Independent
- Spouse: (2nd marriage) Joanna Parker-Nicholls
- Children: 3

Sir Robert John Parker KNZM (born 13 January 1953) is a former New Zealand broadcaster and politician. He served as Mayor of Christchurch from 2007 to 2013.

== Early years ==
Parker grew up in the Christchurch suburbs of Heathcote Valley and Somerfield. He attended Christchurch South Intermediate and Cashmere High School. He studied an intermediate year in zoology at the University of Canterbury before undertaking casual work.

== Broadcasting career ==
Parker got his first job on radio, in Nelson. His broadcasting career then took him to Christchurch, Wellington and then Auckland. He was the associate producer and original host (1984–1996) of the New Zealand version of the This is Your Life series after he purchased the New Zealand television rights for the show from Ralph Edwards Productions in California. He returned to Christchurch in 1992.

== Local-body politics ==
Parker's local government career spanned more than two decades. He first became politically active when he filled a councillor vacancy on the Banks Peninsula District Council in 1994. Having lived in Akaroa for several years, he served as mayor of Banks Peninsula District for two terms (2001–2006). He favoured amalgamation of the district with Christchurch City and led a high profile and controversial campaign leading to a poll in 2005. Amalgamation with the city was supported by 65% of the Peninsula's voters Amalgamation took place on 3 March 2006, at which Parker, after winning a by-election, became a Christchurch city councillor, and the sole Banks Peninsula representative on the council.

In 2006 Parker was elected as the independent chair of the Greater Christchurch Urban Development Strategy. This saw the bringing together of four local councils—Christchurch, Selwyn, Waimakariri and the Canterbury Regional Council—for a major planning undertaking based on creating a sustainable growth plan for the greater Christchurch area. The Strategy was adopted in 2007 by all of the member councils and is today the basis for all spatial planning in the greater Christchurch area.

In October 2007, Parker successfully stood in the local government elections for the Christchurch mayoralty, after the retirement of Garry Moore. He received 47,033 votes, with Megan Woods (32,821) and Jo Giles (14,454) in the election contested by ten candidates.

Parker announced in 2009 that he would seek re-election at the 2010 Christchurch mayoral election.

Despite being the incumbent, he initially polled behind his major challenger, Jim Anderton until the large 2010 Canterbury earthquake on 4 September 2010. His high-profile handling of the civil emergency was widely praised, and polls taken later showed him taking the lead. It was announced on 9 October that Parker had been re-elected for a second term with 68,245 of the votes to Jim Anderton's 51,566 based on 98% of the votes counted.

=== 2010 earthquake ===
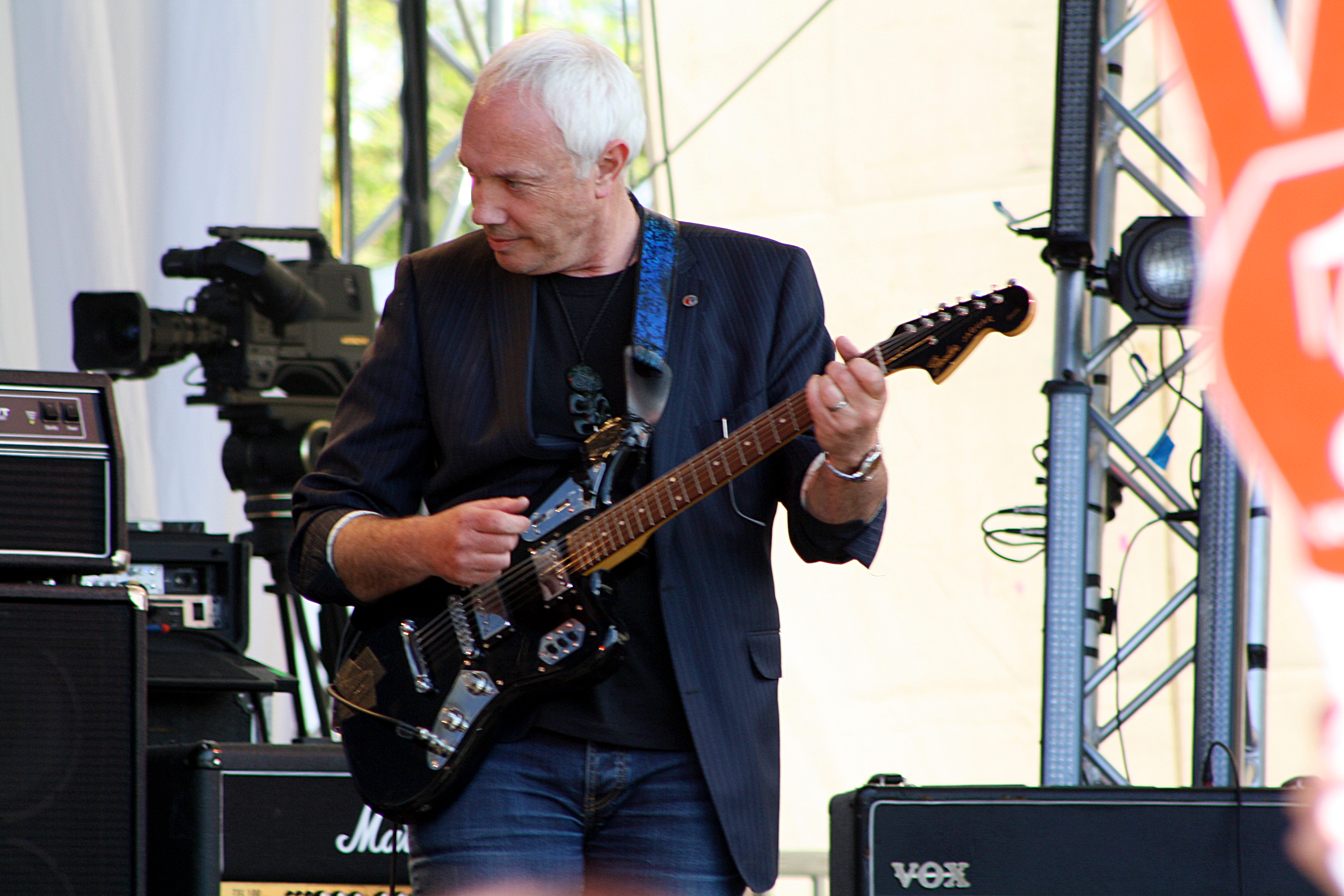
Parker performing with The Bats at the Band Together Concert For Canterbury in October 2010

Parker was the incumbent mayor at the time of the September 2010 Canterbury earthquake. During the days following the quake, he worked with Civil Defence, the police and the New Zealand Army to get the city back up and running. In October 2010, Christchurch band The Bats and many others played at a free earthquake relief concert in Hagley Park in front of about 140,000 people. Parker joined The Bats for the performance and played guitar.

Before the earthquake, some polls had Parker trailing Anderton but his high-profile since 4 September and cool handling of the earthquake's aftermath won him widespread praise and the support of voters who overwhelmingly backed him to run the city for a second term.

=== 2011 earthquake ===
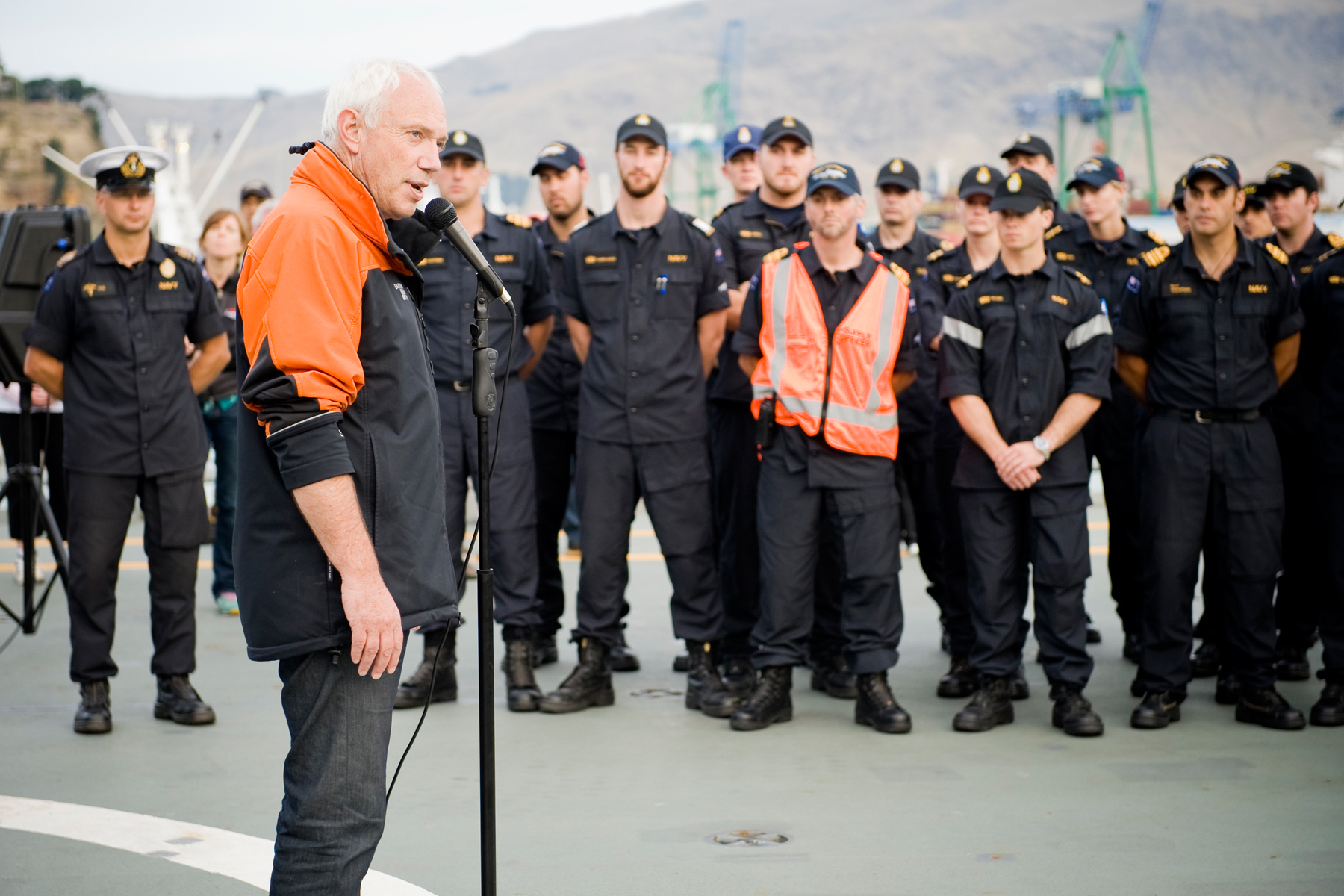
Mayor Parker speaks to ships' companies in the port town Lyttelton

Parker was the media face of the recovery efforts in the aftermath of the February 2011 Christchurch earthquake, working with the police and the army and rescue squads, as well as answering the media's questions.

On 18 March 2011, Parker addressed the national Christchurch memorial service at Hagley Park of Christchurch in the presence of Prince William, Prime Minister John Key, Dame Malvina Major, Hayley Westenra, ChristChurch Cathedral Choir, dignitaries, international rescue teams and tens of thousands of New Zealanders.

After the February earthquake the New Zealand Government brought in a special act of Parliament, The Canterbury Earthquake Recovery Act, which essentially passed ultimate responsibility for the rebuilding of post-quake Christchurch to the Government. The council was given the task of preparing a new plan to rebuild the central business district of the city. The project, chaired by Parker, was titled "share an idea". It won international acclaim for the council, including the international "Co Creation" award – the first time this award had been granted outside of Europe.

Outrage was expressed at the council, after Christchurch City Council CEO Tony Marryatt was given a near $70,000 pay rise in 2011. A protest was held at the City Council Building on 1 February 2012. Approximately 4000 citizens turned up to protest the decision of the City Council, and to call for a mid-term election.

In April 2013 when the government announced the cost of the rebuild was going to be as much as $40 billion, Parker said it was "no surprise", and welcomed the extra investment as being "good for GDP".

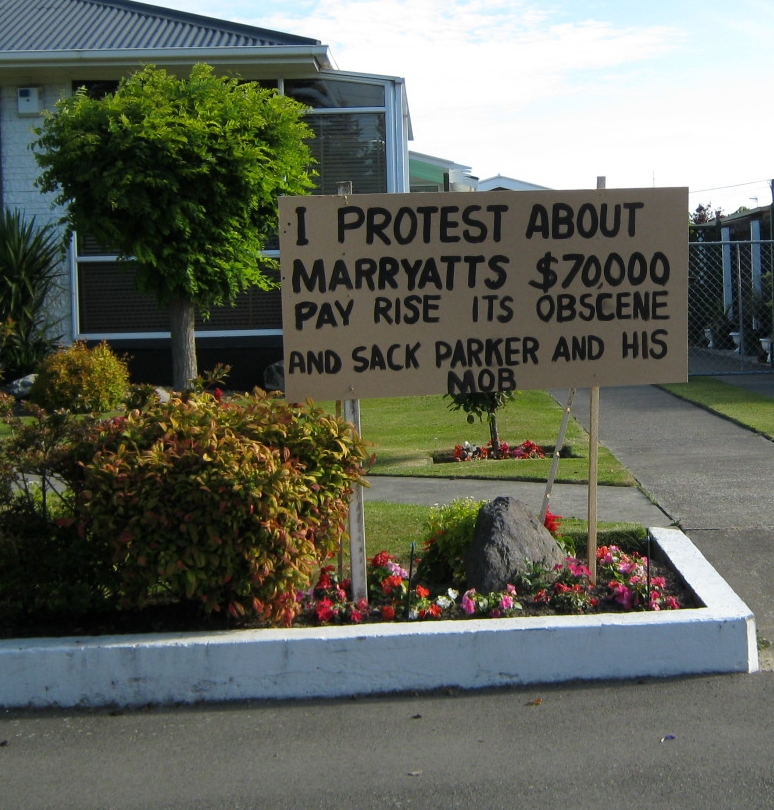
Residential protest against Parker and CEO Tony Marryatt

In mid-June 2013, Minister for Earthquake Recovery Gerry Brownlee revealed in a press conference that International Accreditation New Zealand (IANZ) had written to Christchurch City Council threatening to revoke its accreditation for issuing building consents. This caught Parker by surprise, as he knew nothing of this threat, and he criticised Brownlee for not communicating with him before the press conference; Parker famously labelled Brownlee's practice a "media missile". Brownlee and Parker had at times a strained relationship, with the government taking an increasing amount of control in local decision making.

In July 2013, Parker announced on Campbell Live he would not be running for re-election in the 2013 Christchurch mayoral elections, citing exhaustion and not having the required energy for a third term as mayor. He stated that although staff had assured him they would satisfy the requirements of the consenting process the accreditation had been withdrawn; as this had happened on "his watch" as Mayor he felt he should take responsibility for the loss.

In July 2013 an editorial in The Press noted that a tribute paid to Parker by the Prime Minister of New Zealand John Key was "well deserved". The Prime Minister in a speech to the Local Government New Zealand organisation in 2013 stated that Parker's "commitment to the city during its darkest hours will be his legacy".

In the 2014 New Year Honours, Parker was appointed a Knight Companion of the New Zealand Order of Merit for services to local-body affairs and the community. An editorial in The Press stated that Parker had "fronted the media coverage of the two disasters and the ensuing civil emergencies to local and international media. His calm leadership throughout the emergency periods were noted for providing reassurance and hope to the people of Christchurch."

== Awards and recognition ==
- Knight Companion New Zealand Order of Merit (2014)
- Member N.Z. Institute of Directors
- Paul Harris Fellow award 2013 – The Rotary International Foundation
- Pegasus Health 2013 Chairmans award for Outstanding Leadership
- Minister of Civil Defence Award, 2012
- Public Relations Institute N Z Communicator of the Year 2012
- New Zealander of the Year "Local Hero" award, 2012
- Justice of the Peace (2000)

== Personal life ==
Parker has three sons from his first marriage. His second marriage is to Joanna Nicholls-Parker.

In January 2021, it was revealed that Parker was staying in a long-term care facility after suffering a serious stroke in October 2020. His health had deteriorated following a heart attack in May 2019, which he had initially recovered from. Parker spent eleven days in intensive care, followed by three months of rehabilitation, during which he suffered two smaller strokes. As a result, he began using a wheelchair and reportedly had limited movement in his left side. In June 2021, Parker appeared on TVNZ's Sunday, and revealed he had suffered memory loss. In particular, he appeared unable to remember his mayoralty during the post-quake recovery of Christchurch, could not recall details about the disaster in the interview, and did not recognise himself when watching back his previous television appearances.

Political offices
Preceded by Noeline Allan	Mayor of Banks Peninsula; 2001–2006	Office abolished
Preceded by Garry Moore	Mayor of Christchurch; 2007–2013	Succeeded by Lianne Dalziel
