= Garry Moore (mayor) =

44th Mayor of Christchurch

Garry Moore CNZM
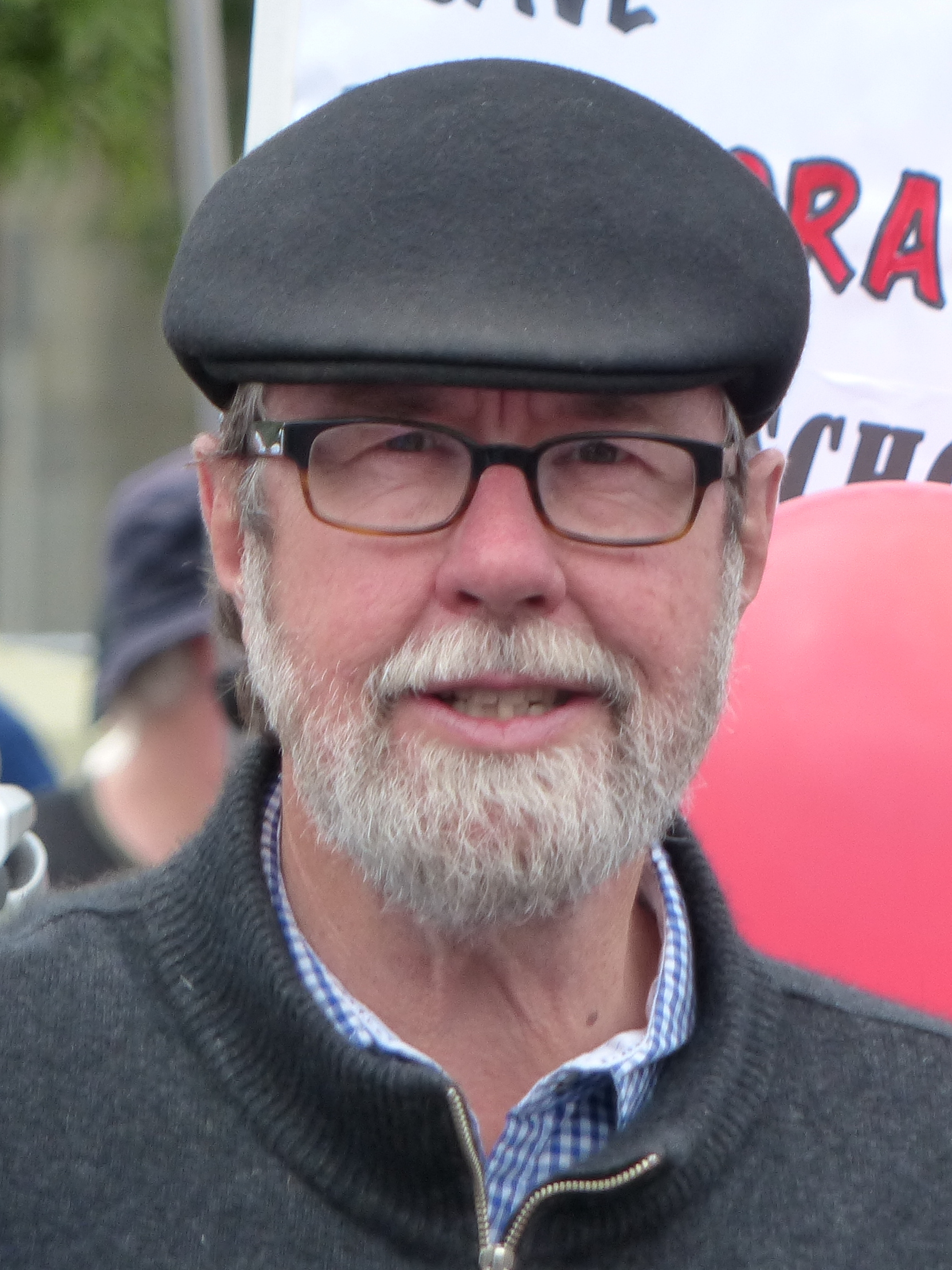
- Garry Moore in 2012

44th Mayor of Christchurch
- In office 1998–2007
- Preceded by: Vicki Buck
- Succeeded by: Bob Parker

Personal details
- Born: Garry Anthony Moore; 8 January 1951 (age 75) Palmerston North, New Zealand
- Party: Christchurch 2021 (local)
- Spouse: Pam Sharpe

Garry Anthony Moore CNZM (born 8 January 1951) is a former mayor of Christchurch, New Zealand, serving from 1998 to 2007. Subsequently, he was a board member of the NZ Transport Agency. He is a 'South Island enthusiast'.

== Early life ==
Moore was born in Palmerston North in 1951 and received his schooling there. He trained as an accountant; first at Palmerston North Technical Institute and then at Christchurch Polytechnic Institute of Technology. He had come to Christchurch through his love for vintage cars; the Vintage Car Club was founded in the city and rural roads around Christchurch are ideal for excursions in old cars. He met his wife, Pam Sharpe, while they were both studying at Christchurch Polytechnic. They were married in 1977 and have two girls and two boys. In the 1980s, he was involved in several schemes helping unemployed people. Whale Watch Kaikōura is one such company that he helped set up.

== Political career ==
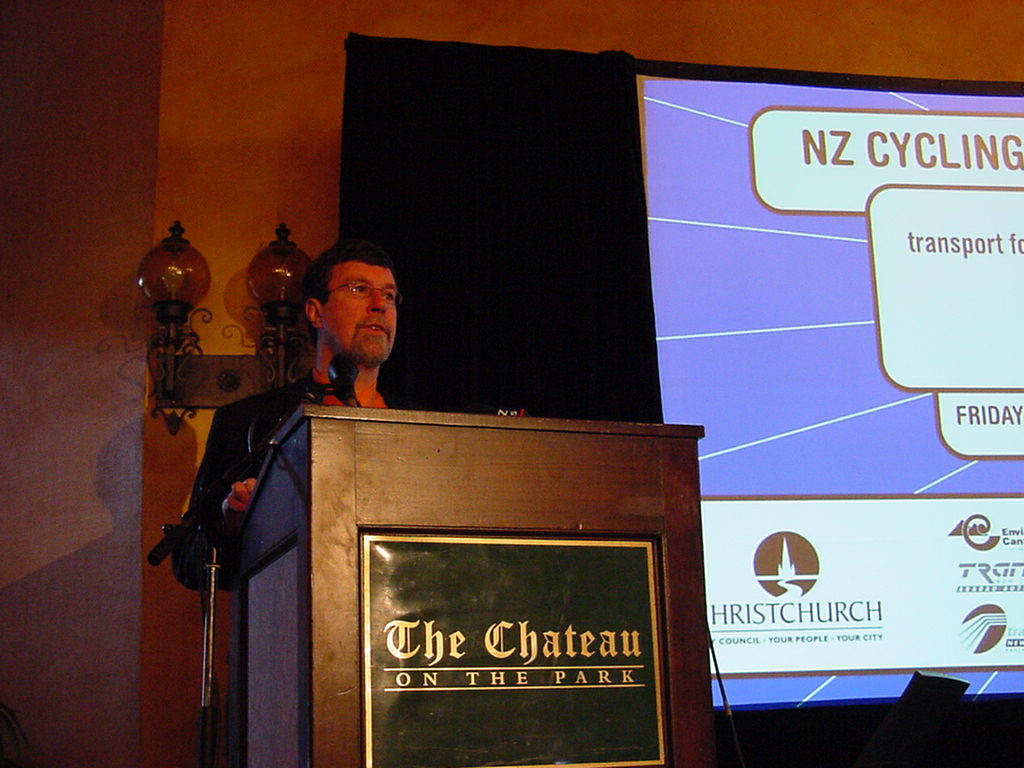
Garry Moore opening the 2001 NZ Cycling Conference

In 1989, Moore was elected to the Area Health Board, which can be seen as early predecessors of the District Health Boards. Starting in 1992, he served two terms as councillor, before he was elected mayor in the 1998 local body elections. He announced that he would not stand for re-election in the 2007 local body elections. Former television host Bob Parker succeeded Moore as mayor of Christchurch in October 2007.

== Post-political career ==
In 2008 Moore was appointed a board member of the newly amalgamated NZ Transport Agency. Post-earthquake, Moore was a strong critic of the government agency Canterbury Earthquake Recovery Authority.

Moore founded a blog and related speaking group called the Tuesday Club.

In 2024 Moore experienced a stroke, and as of September 2024 he was recovering well. Moore revealed he had experienced a brain seizure and three "mini-strokes" before the major stroke in May.

== Honours and awards ==
In 1990, Moore was awarded the New Zealand 1990 Commemoration Medal. In the 2008 New Year Honours, he was appointed a Companion of the New Zealand Order of Merit, for services to local-body affairs.

== See also ==
- 2001 Christchurch mayoral election
- 2004 Christchurch mayoral election

Political offices
Preceded by Vicki Buck	Mayor of Christchurch; 1998–2007	Succeeded by Bob Parker
