= Tubby Hansen =

New Zealand perennial candidate

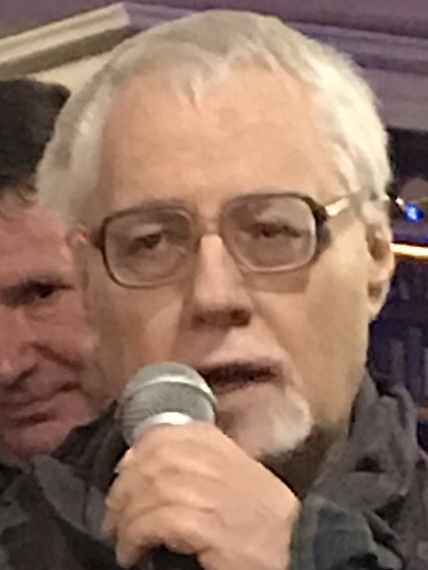
- Hansen in 2019
- Born: Christopher Michael Hansen; 1944 or 1945
- Occupation: Perennial candidate
- Years active: 1969–present

Christopher Michael "Tubby" Hansen (born 1944 or 1945) is a perennial candidate from Christchurch, New Zealand, who has stood in every general and Christchurch local-body election since 1969. He has never been elected to public office.

== Early life and childhood ==
Hansen grew up in an abusive family with a drunken and violent father. The family settled in Christchurch in 1961 after moving around for railway work. In 1966 he was remanded in Sunnyside Hospital for observation after being charged with assault. He later worked as a freezing worker, and for Temuka Pottery and the Christchurch Gas Company.

== Political activism ==
He first ran for election at the 1969 New Zealand general election, contesting the Sydenham electorate under the banner of "Economic Euthenics", winning 97 votes. He stood again in 1972 as the "Anti Maori – Violence – Pro Apartheid Party", and in 1975 for the Pensioners' Party. He then returned to the party name of "Economic Euthenics", standing in the Sydenham electorate for every election until its abolition in 1996, and then in the Wigram electorate from 1996 to 2023. During the 2026 New Zealand general election, he contested the electorate of Christchurch Central; receiving 142 votes based on preliminary results. Hansen also stood in one parliamentary by-election: he received just 10 votes in the 1979 Christchurch Central by-election.

Hansen has also contested local-body elections in Christchurch, beginning with the 1971 Christchurch mayoral election where he won 618 votes. He has contested the Christchurch mayoralty ever since, most recently in 2025, and has stood for other local-body positions as well under a variety of party names, including "Economic Euthenics", "Progressive Nudist", and "a bus for Sommerfield". His candidate blurbs have been described as "precious works of art".
