= 2014 Speaker of the New Zealand House of Representatives election =

← 2013	20 October 2014
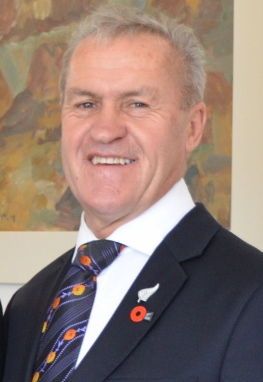

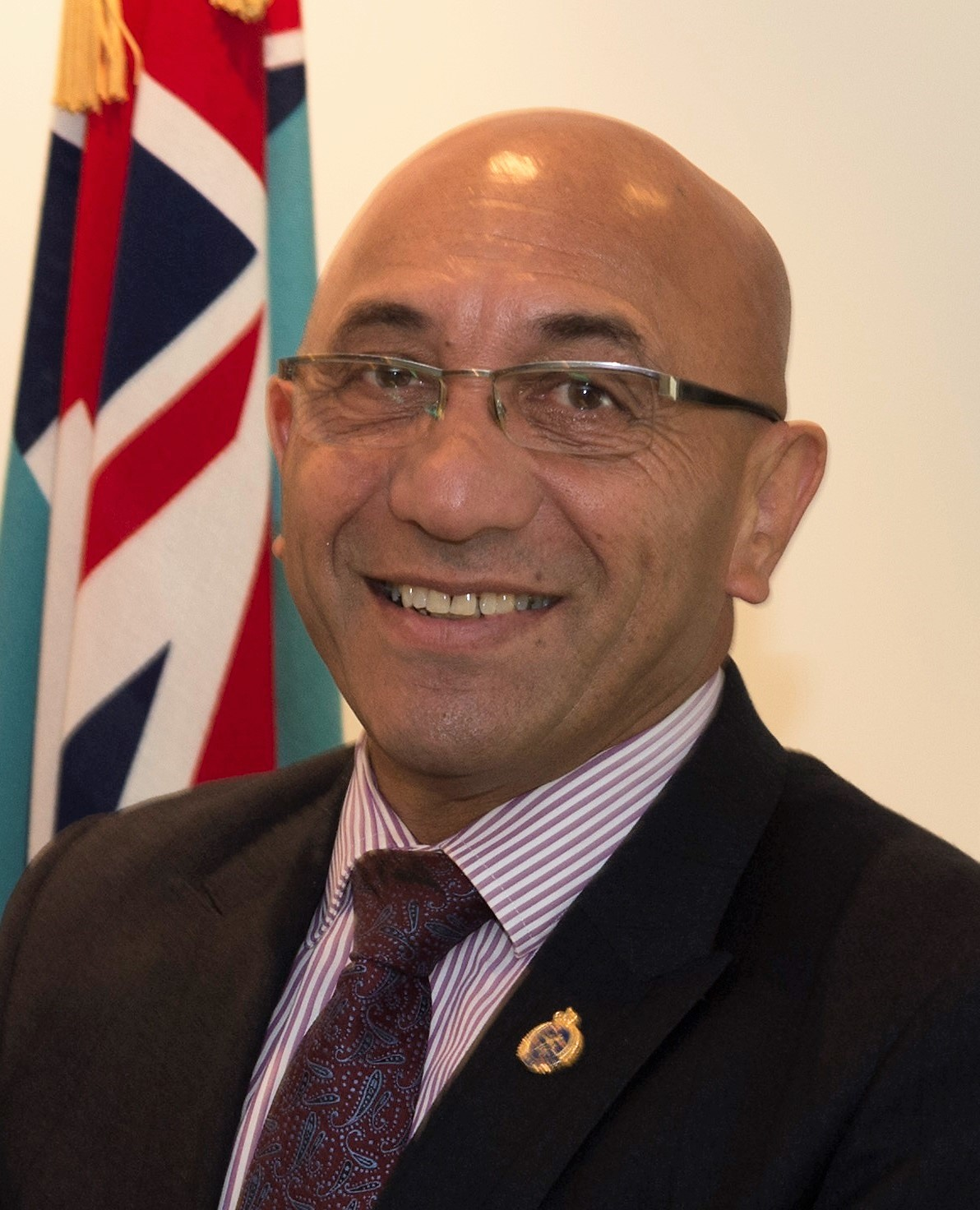
Candidate	David Carter	Ron Mark
Party	National	NZ First
Popular vote	94	13
Percentage	78.99	10.92
Speaker before election
David Carter
National
Elected Speaker
David Carter
National

The 2014 election of the Speaker of the New Zealand House of Representatives occurred on 20 October 2014, following the 2014 general election result. The election resulted in the re-election of National Party MP David Carter as Speaker.

== Nominated candidates ==
- Rt Hon David Carter, List MP – National Party
- Ron Mark, List MP – New Zealand First

== Election ==
The election was conducted by means of a conventional parliamentary motion. The Clerk of the House of Representatives conducted a vote on the question of the election of the Speaker, in accordance with Standing Order 19.

The following table gives the election results:

Party	Candidate	Votes	%
National	David Carter	94	78.99
NZ First	Ron Mark	13	10.92
Abstentions		12	10.08
Majority		81	68.06
Turnout		119	—

How each MP voted:

Party	Name	Speaker Vote
National	Amy Adams	Carter
Labour	Jacinda Ardern	Carter
National	Kanwaljit Singh Bakshi	Carter
NZ First	Darroch Ball	Mark
National	Todd Barclay	Carter
National	Maggie Barry	Carter
National	Andrew Bayly	Carter
National	David Bennett	Carter
National	Paula Bennett	Carter
NZ First	Mahesh Bindra	Mark
National	Chris Bishop	Carter
National	Chester Borrows	Carter
National	Simon Bridges	Carter
Green	Steffan Browning	Mark
National	Gerry Brownlee	Carter
National	David Carter	Carter
Labour	David Clark	Carter
Green	David Clendon	Abstain
National	Jonathan Coleman	Carter
National	Judith Collins	Carter
Labour	Clayton Cosgrove	Carter
Labour	David Cunliffe	Carter
Labour	Clare Curran	Carter
Labour	Kelvin Davis	Carter
National	Jacqui Dean	Carter
Green	Catherine Delahunty	Abstain
National	Matt Doocey	Carter
National	Sarah Dowie	Carter
United Future	Peter Dunne	Carter
Labour	Ruth Dyson	Carter
National	Bill English	Carter
Labour	Kris Faafoi	Carter
National	Christopher Finlayson	Carter
Māori Party	Te Ururoa Flavell	Carter
National	Craig Foss	Carter
National	Paul Foster-Bell	Carter
Māori Party	Marama Fox	Mark
Labour	Phil Goff	Carter
National	Paul Goldsmith	Carter
National	Jo Goodhew	Carter
Green	Kennedy Graham	Abstain
National	Tim Groser	Carter
National	Nathan Guy	Carter
Green	Kevin Hague	Abstain
National	Jo Hayes	Carter
Labour	Peeni Henare	Carter
Labour	Chris Hipkins	Carter
National	Brett Hudson	Carter
Green	Gareth Hughes	Abstain
National	Steven Joyce	Carter
National	Nikki Kaye	Carter
National	John Key	Carter
Labour	Annette King	Carter
National	Nuk Korako	Carter
National	Barbara Kuriger	Carter
National	Melissa Lee	Carter
Labour	Iain Lees-Galloway	Carter
Labour	Andrew Little	Carter
Green	Jan Logie	Abstain
National	Sam Lotu-Iiga	Carter
National	Tim Macindoe	Carter
Labour	Nanaia Mahuta	Carter
Labour	Trevor Mallard	Carter
Green	Mojo Mathers	Abstain
NZ First	Ron Mark	Mark
NZ First	Tracey Martin	Mark
National	Todd McClay	Carter
National	Ian McKelvie	Carter
NZ First	Clayton Mitchell	Mark
National	Mark Mitchell	Carter
Labour	Sue Moroney	Carter
National	Todd Muller	Carter
Labour	Stuart Nash	Carter
National	Jono Naylor	Carter
National	Alfred Ngaro	Carter
Green	Russel Norman	Abstain
Labour	Damien O'Connor	Carter
National	Simon O'Connor	Carter
NZ First	Denis O'Rourke	Mark
NZ First	Pita Paraone	Mark
National	Hekia Parata	Carter
Labour	David Parker	Carter
National	Parmjeet Parmar	Carter
NZ First	Winston Peters	Mark
NZ First	Richard Prosser	Mark
National	Shane Reti	Carter
Labour	Grant Robertson	Carter
Green	Denise Roche	Abstain
National	Jami-Lee Ross	Carter
Labour	Adrian Rurawhe	Carter
National	Mike Sabin	Carter
Green	Eugenie Sage	Abstain
Labour	Jenny Salesa	Carter
National	Alastair Scott	Carter
Labour	Carmel Sepuloni	Carter
ACT	David Seymour	Carter
Green	James Shaw	Abstain
Labour	David Shearer	Carter
National	Scott Simpson	Carter
Labour	William Sio	Carter
National	Nick Smith	Carter
National	Stuart Smith	Carter
NZ First	Barbara Stewart	Mark
NZ First	Fletcher Tabuteau	Mark
Labour	Rino Tirikatene	Carter
National	Lindsay Tisch	Carter
National	Anne Tolley	Carter
Green	Metiria Turei	Abstain
Labour	Phil Twyford	Carter
National	Louise Upston	Carter
National	Nicky Wagner	Carter
Labour	Louisa Wall	Carter
Labour	Meka Whaitiri	Carter
Labour	Poto Williams	Carter
National	Maurice Williamson	Carter
National	Michael Woodhouse	Carter
Labour	Megan Woods	Carter
National	Jian Yang	Carter
National	Jonathan Young	Carter
