= 2013 Speaker of the New Zealand House of Representatives election =

← 2005	31 January 2013	2014 →
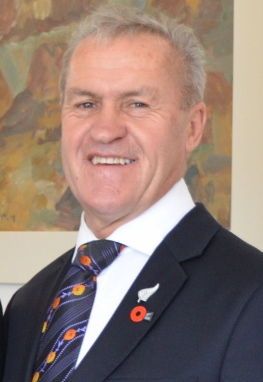

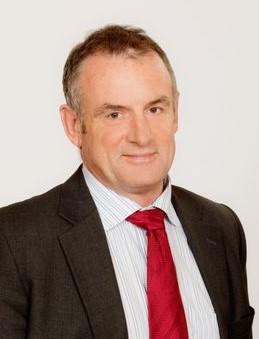
Candidate	David Carter	Trevor Mallard
Party	National	Labour
Popular vote	62	52
Percentage	54.38	45.62
Speaker before election
Lockwood Smith
National
Elected Speaker
David Carter
National

The 2013 election of the Speaker of the New Zealand House of Representatives occurred on 31 January 2013, following the retirement of the previous Speaker Lockwood Smith. The election resulted in the election of National Party MP David Carter.

== Nominated candidates ==
- Hon David Carter, List MP – National Party
- Hon Trevor Mallard, MP for Hutt South – Labour Party

== Election ==
The election was conducted by means of a conventional parliamentary motion. The Clerk of the House of Representatives conducted a vote on the question of the election of the Speaker, in accordance with Standing Order 19.

The following table gives the election results:

Party	Candidate	Votes	%
National	David Carter	62	54.38
Labour	Trevor Mallard	52	45.62
Majority		10	8.77
Turnout		119	—

How each MP voted:

Party	Name	Speaker Vote
National	Amy Adams	Carter
Labour	Jacinda Ardern	Mallard
National	Shane Ardern	Carter
National	Chris Auchinvole	Carter
National	Kanwaljit Singh Bakshi	Carter
ACT	John Banks	Carter
National	Maggie Barry	Carter
National	David Bennett	Carter
National	Paula Bennett	Carter
National	Jackie Blue	Carter
National	Chester Borrows	Carter
National	Simon Bridges	Carter
Green	Steffan Browning	Mallard
National	Gerry Brownlee	Carter
National	Cam Calder	Carter
National	David Carter	Carter
Labour	Charles Chauvel	Mallard
Labour	David Clark	Mallard
Green	David Clendon	Mallard
National	Jonathan Coleman	Carter
National	Judith Collins	Carter
Labour	Clayton Cosgrove	Mallard
Labour	David Cunliffe	Mallard
Labour	Clare Curran	Mallard
Labour	Lianne Dalziel	Mallard
National	Jacqui Dean	Carter
Green	Catherine Delahunty	Mallard
National	Matt Doocey	Carter
National	Sarah Dowie	Carter
United Future	Peter Dunne	Carter
Labour	Ruth Dyson	Mallard
National	Bill English	Carter
Labour	Kris Faafoi	Mallard
Labour	Darien Fenton	Mallard
National	Christopher Finlayson	Carter
Māori Party	Te Ururoa Flavell	Carter
National	Craig Foss	Carter
National	Paul Foster-Bell	Carter
Green	Julie Anne Genter	Mallard
Labour	Phil Goff	Mallard
National	Paul Goldsmith	Carter
National	Jo Goodhew	Carter
Green	Kennedy Graham	Mallard
National	Tim Groser	Carter
National	Nathan Guy	Carter
Green	Kevin Hague	Mallard
National	Jo Hayes	Carter
Mana Party	Hone Harawira	Mallard
National	Phil Heatley	Carter
National	Tau Henare	Carter
Labour	Chris Hipkins	Mallard
NZ First	Brendan Horan	Mallard
Green	Gareth Hughes	Mallard
Labour	Raymond Huo	Mallard
National	Paul Hutchison	Carter
Labour	Shane Jones	Mallard
National	Steven Joyce	Carter
National	Nikki Kaye	Carter
National	John Key	Carter
Labour	Annette King	Mallard
National	Colin King	Carter
National	Nuk Korako	Carter
National	Melissa Lee	Carter
Labour	Iain Lees-Galloway	Mallard
Labour	Andrew Little	Mallard
Green	Jan Logie	Mallard
National	Sam Lotu-Iiga	Carter
National	Tim Macindoe	Carter
Labour	Moana Mackey	Mallard
Labour	Nanaia Mahuta	Mallard
Labour	Trevor Mallard	Mallard
Green	Mojo Mathers	Mallard
NZ First	Ron Mark	Mallard
NZ First	Tracey Martin	Mallard
National	Todd McClay	Carter
National	Murray McCully	Carter
National	Ian McKelvie	Carter
National	Mark Mitchell	Carter
Labour	Sue Moroney	Mallard
National	Jono Naylor	Carter
National	Alfred Ngaro	Carter
Green	Russel Norman	Mallard
Labour	Damien O'Connor	Mallard
National	Simon O'Connor	Carter
NZ First	Denis O'Rourke	Mallard
National	Hekia Parata	Carter
Labour	David Parker	Mallard
National	Parmjeet Parmar	Carter
Labour	Rajen Prasad	Mallard
NZ First	Winston Peters	Mallard
NZ First	Richard Prosser	Mallard
Labour	Grant Robertson	Mallard
Labour	Ross Robertson	Mallard
Green	Denise Roche	Mallard
National	Jami-Lee Ross	Carter
National	Eric Roy	Carter
Labour	Adrian Rurawhe	Mallard
National	Tony Ryall	Carter
National	Mike Sabin	Carter
Green	Eugenie Sage	Mallard
National	Katrina Shanks	Carter
Māori Party	Pita Sharples	Carter
Labour	David Shearer	Mallard
National	Scott Simpson	Carter
Labour	William Sio	Mallard
National	Lockwood Smith	Carter
National	Nick Smith	Carter
NZ First	Barbara Stewart	Mallard
Labour	Maryan Street	Mallard
Labour	Rino Tirikatene	Mallard
National	Lindsay Tisch	Carter
National	Anne Tolley	Carter
National	Chris Tremain	Carter
Green	Metiria Turei	Mallard
Māori Party	Tariana Turia	Carter
Labour	Phil Twyford	Mallard
National	Louise Upston	Carter
National	Nicky Wagner	Carter
Green	Holly Walker	Mallard
Labour	Louisa Wall	Mallard
National	Kate Wilkinson	Carter
Labour	Poto Williams	Mallard
National	Maurice Williamson	Carter
National	Michael Woodhouse	Carter
Labour	Megan Woods	Mallard
National	Jian Yang	Carter
National	Jonathan Young	Carter
