= Hākinikini Marine Reserve =

Marine reserve in New Zealand

Hākinikini Marine Reserve is a marine reserve off the southeast of the South Island of New Zealand, off the coast of Milton. When it was announced in 2023, it was reported to have a size of 6 square kilometres. The marine reserve came into effect in 2026.

In 2023 it was reported that Kāi Tahu would be allowed to access the Waitaki Marine Reserve to retrieve ancestral remains, artefacts and marine mammal remains, and carry out practices to enhance their mātauraka Māori. Kāi Tahu would manage the reserve alongside the Department of Conservation.

== History ==
The marine reserve was announced on 5 October 2023 along with five other new marine reserves, announced by Conservation Minister Willow-Jean Prime and Oceans and Fisheries Minister Rachel Brooking. These reserves were Hākinikini, Papanui, Ōrau, Ōkaihae, Te Umu Kōau and Waitaki Marine Reserve. Ninety percent of 4,000 submissions supported the creation of the reserve and the five others. For the reserves to become official, they had to go through an Order in Council and gazetting process, which meant that a new government had the potential to scrap the reserve. Before then, there were no restrictions in the area. The creation of the reserves were delayed in June 2024 due to "key mapping errors". On 28 May 2026 five of the reserves were gazzetted, and they came into effect on 1 July 2026.

== See also ==
- Marine reserves of New Zealand
