= Grant McCallum =

New Zealand National Party politician

Grant McCallum MP
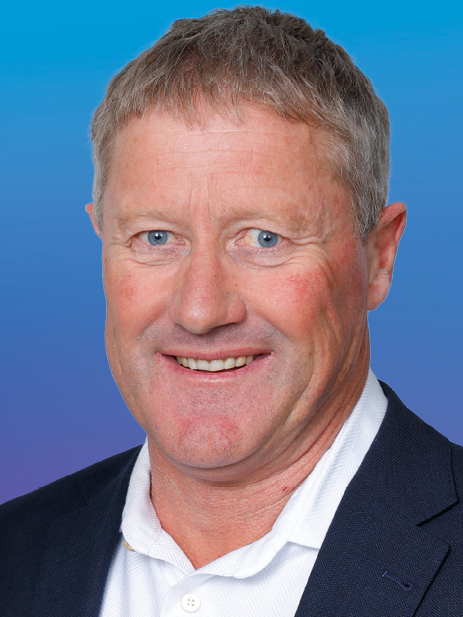
- McCallum in 2023

Member of the New Zealand Parliament for Northland
- Incumbent
- Assumed office 14 October 2023
- Preceded by: Willow-Jean Prime

Personal details
- Born: Grant Lewis McCallum; 1964 or 1965 (age 61–62)
- Party: National

Grant Lewis McCallum (born 1964 or 1965) is a New Zealand politician representing the National Party as a Member of Parliament since the 2023 New Zealand general election.

== Early life ==
McCallum's father, Ron McCallum, was the electorate chairman for the National Party in Kaipara and Whangārei. McCallum moved to Northland in the 1970s. He studied agricultural commerce at Lincoln College, graduating in 1988. He owns a farm in Maungaturoto. He is the chairperson of the Kauri Museum in Matakohe. McCallum has been on the executive of the Bluegreens (the National Party environmental issues advisory group) since 2001, spent ten years serving on the National Party board (2005–2015), and was vice-president of the Northland branch of Federated Farmers. In 2019, McCallum posted a misleadingly edited clip of Environment Minister David Parker on Twitter, which falsely suggested that Parker had said he hated farmers.

== Political career ==
New Zealand Parliament
Years	Term	Electorate	List	Party
2023–2026	54th	Northland	68	National
2026–present	55th	Northland	34	National

McCallum contested the selection for the National Party candidacy for the 2015 Northland by-election, but lost to Mark Osborne. McCallum was the campaign chairman for MP Matt King in the 2020 general election, when King lost his seat. After joining the 2022 protests at Parliament, King resigned from the National Party.

McCallum was selected by the National Party to contest the Northland electorate at the 2023 election. He was 68th on the party list. On election night McCallum received more than 16,272 votes, beating incumbent Willow-Jean Prime by a margin of 6,087 votes.

During the 2026 New Zealand general election, McCallum contested the Northland for National. He was ranked 34th on the National Party list. On 7 November, McCallum retained Northland for National by a large margin of 7,942 votes, based on preliminary results.

== Views and positions ==
McCallum identified the cost of living and regulatory burden on farmers as issues in his electorate. After the election, he said "It’s a huge responsibility and Northland has quite a lot of challenges and big issues that we can’t fix overnight. We need to see what state the economy is in and we are going to have to really justify any spending we do."

== Personal life ==
McCallum has at least two children.
