= Far North (electorate) =

Far North is a former New Zealand parliamentary electorate, which existed for one parliamentary term from 1993 to 1996, and was held by National's John Carter.

== Population centres ==
Based on the 1991 New Zealand census, an electoral redistribution was carried out. This resulted in the abolition of nine electorates, and the creation of eleven new electorates. Through an amendment in the Electoral Act in 1965, the number of electorates in the South Island was fixed at 25, so the new electorates increased the number of the North Island electorates by two. In the South Island, one electorate was abolished and one electorate was recreated. In the North Island, five electorates were newly created (including Far North), five electorates were recreated, and eight electorates were abolished.

Polling booths where more than 1,000 votes were cast were located in Kaikohe, Kaitaia, and Kerikeri.

== History ==
John Carter of the National Party was the electorate's representative during its existence from 1993 to 1996. Carter had previously represented the Bay of Islands electorate since the 1987 election. After the Far North electorate was abolished in 1996, Carter transferred to the new Northland electorate, which he represented until his retirement from parliament in July 2011.

=== Members of Parliament ===
Key

National

Election	Winner
1993 election	John Carter
(Electorate abolished 1996, see Northland)

== Election results ==
=== 1993 election ===
1993 general election: Far North
Party	Candidate	Votes	%	±%
National	John Carter	6,977	39.92	
NZ First	Maryanne Baker	3,552	20.33	
Labour	Robert Lowe	3,418	19.56	
Alliance	Jon Field	2,926	16.74	
Christian Heritage	Edmund Charles Jack	387	2.21	
McGillicuddy Serious	Tim Rowe	163	0.93	
Natural Law	Selwyn Matia Austin	53	0.30	
Majority		3,425	19.60	
Informal votes		560	3.10	
Turnout		18,036	83.26	
Registered electors		21,661		
