= John Carter (New Zealand politician) =

New Zealand politician

The Honourable John Carter QSO
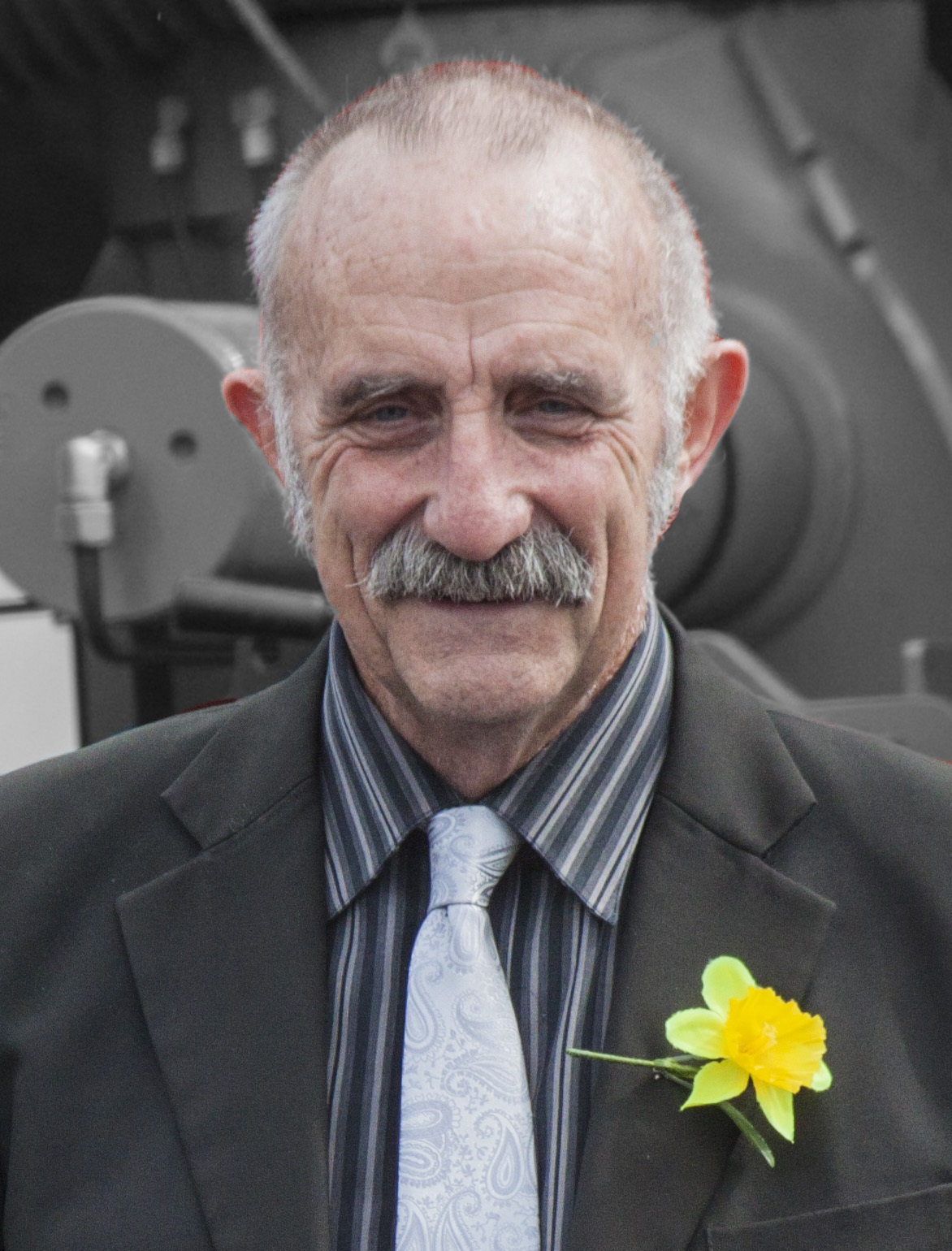

Minister of Civil Defence
- In office 19 November 2008 – 8 June 2011
- Prime Minister: John Key
- Preceded by: Rick Barker
- Succeeded by: Craig Foss

9th Minister for Senior Citizens
- In office 19 November 2008 – 8 June 2011
- Prime Minister: John Key
- Preceded by: Ruth Dyson
- Succeeded by: Craig Foss

9th Minister of Racing
- In office 19 November 2008 – 8 June 2011
- Prime Minister: John Key
- Preceded by: Winston Peters
- Succeeded by: Craig Foss

Member of the New Zealand Parliament for Northland
- In office 1996 – 17 July 2011
- Preceded by: new electorate
- Succeeded by: Mike Sabin
- Majority: 10,054 (29.89%)

Member of the New Zealand Parliament for Far North
- In office 1993–1996

Member of the New Zealand Parliament for Bay of Islands
- In office 1987–1993
- Preceded by: Neill Austin

5th Mayor of the Far North
- In office October 2013 – October 2022
- Preceded by: Wayne Brown
- Succeeded by: Moko Tepania

Personal details
- Born: 8 May 1950 (age 76) Te Kōpuru, New Zealand
- Party: National Party
- Occupation: Local government official
- Website: johncarter.co.nz

John McGregor Carter QSO (born 8 May 1950) is a New Zealand politician, and member of the National Party. He represented the Bay of Islands, Far North and Northland electorates in Parliament from 1987 until July 2011, when he became New Zealand's high commissioner to the Cook Islands. Since the October 2013 local elections, he served as mayor of the Far North District for 9 years until his retirement from politics in 2022.

== Early life ==
He was born in Te Kōpuru, Northland and educated at Otamatea High School. Before entering politics, Carter worked as a local government administration official. He was the county clerk and principal officer at Hokianga County Council until his election to Parliament in 1987. Carter is married, and has one daughter and two sons.

== Political career ==
=== Member of Parliament ===
New Zealand Parliament
Years	Term	Electorate	List	Party
1987–1990	42nd	Bay of Islands		National
1990–1993	43rd	Bay of Islands		National
1993–1996	44th	Far North		National
1996–1999	45th	Northland	34	National
1999–2002	46th	Northland	16	National
2002–2005	47th	Northland	21	National
2005–2008	48th	Northland	15	National
2008–2011	49th	Northland	21	National

Carter was elected to Parliament in the 1987 election, winning the Bay of Islands electorate. He continued to represent the area when the seat changed names to Far North in 1993 and later Northland. The National Party came to power in the 1990 election and Carter was appointed as the Junior Government Whip, and later Senior Government Whip until 1995 and again from 1996 to mid-2004.

Carter was sacked as whip in 1995, after he phoned into a talkback radio show, hosted by fellow National MP John Banks, impersonating a work-shy Māori called Hone, causing widespread offence.

In the first term of the Fifth National Government, Carter was a Minister outside of Cabinet, holding the Civil Defence, Senior Citizens, Racing and Associate Local Government portfolios. He also chaired the Auckland Governance Legislation select committee.

In February 2011, the government announced that Carter would be the next High Commissioner to the Cook Islands. He left Parliament in July 2011, but his departure did not result in a by-election, as the vacancy occurred within six months of the next general election. On 13 June 2011 Carter was granted the right to retain the title of The Honourable for his lifetime. He retired as New Zealand's High Commissioner to the Cook Islands in July 2013.

=== Local government ===
Carter returned to the Far North District of New Zealand, successfully running for mayor of the district at the 2013 local elections, defeating the incumbent Wayne Brown. He was re-elected again in both 2016 and 2019. He lives at Waipapakauri Ramp on Ninety Mile Beach.

In October 2021, Carter expressed opposition to the Sixth Labour Government's Three Waters reform programme, describing it as a "mistake."

In September 2022, Carter announced that he would not run as Mayor during the 2022 New Zealand local elections on 8 October. He was succeeded as Mayor of the Far North by Moko Tepania, who became the district's first Māori mayor.

== Political views ==
Carter is a supporter of the monarchy in New Zealand. In 1992, a year described by Queen Elizabeth II as her annus horribilis, Carter called on New Zealanders to write in to express their support for her, having written to The Times of London criticising the British media's apparent lack of respect towards the Queen. Inundated with letters of support, he remarked that "we wanted her to know we cared". In March 1994 he publicly disavowed Prime Minister Jim Bolger's call for a New Zealand republic.

== Honours ==
In 1990, Carter was awarded the New Zealand 1990 Commemoration Medal. In the 2012 New Year Honours, he was appointed a Companion of the Queen's Service Order for services as a Member of Parliament.

Political offices
Preceded by Rick Barker	Minister of Civil Defence; 2008–2011	Succeeded by Craig Foss
Preceded by Ruth Dyson	Minister for Senior Citizens; 2008–2011	Succeeded by Craig Foss
Preceded by Winston Peters	Minister of Racing; 2008–2011	Succeeded by Craig Foss
New Zealand Parliament
Preceded by Neill Austin	Member of Parliament for Bay of Islands; 1987–1993	Constituency abolished
New constituency	Member of Parliament for Far North; 1993–1996	Constituency abolished
New constituency	Member of Parliament for Northland; 1996–2011	Succeeded by Mike Sabin
