= David Clendon =

New Zealand politician

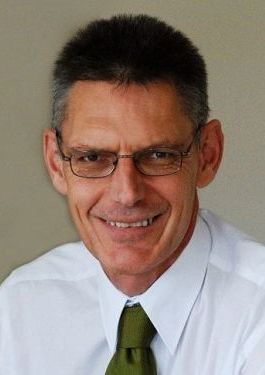

Member of the New Zealand Parliament for Green party list
- In office 2 November 2009 – 23 September 2017
- Preceded by: Sue Bradford (Note: Normally, list MPs do not have individual predecessors or successors, but Bradford resigned during a sitting parliament and therefore was succeeded by Clendon.)

Co-convenor of the Green Party
- In office 2001–2004 Serving with Catherine Delahunty
- Preceded by: Richard Davies
- Succeeded by: Paul de Spa

Personal details
- Born: 11 September 1955 (age 71) Helensville, New Zealand
- Party: Green (1990–2017)
- Domestic partner: Lindis
- Children: Kaya

David James Clendon (born 11 September 1955) is a New Zealand former politician. He was a list Member of Parliament in the New Zealand House of Representatives for the Green Party of Aotearoa New Zealand from 2009 until 2017. He later served one term on the Far North District Council from 2019 to 2022.

== Early life and career ==
Clendon is of Ngāpuhi, Te Roroa and Pākehā descent. He is a descendant of James Reddy Clendon, the United States Consul in New Zealand. He has a partner, Lindis, and one daughter, Kaya.

Clendon left school aged 15. He worked in business, eventually managing an engineering supplies company. In 1994, he completed a Master of Science from Lincoln University. He worked as an environmental management lecturer at Unitec Institute of Technology in Auckland and as a sustainable business advisor.

Clendon has been resident in Kerikeri since 2012.

== Early political career ==
Clendon joined the Green Party in 1990. In both the 1999 and 2005 elections, Clendon polled third in the seat of Waitakere, ranked 19th and 12th on the party list, respectively.

With Catherine Delahunty, Clendon was a co-convenor of the Green Party from 2001 to 2004. He did not contest the 2002 general election because the party's constitution bars co-convenors from standing for Parliament.

Along with MP Nándor Tánczos, former MP Mike Ward and 2005 election campaign manager Russel Norman, Clendon contested the Green's male leadership role in 2005 after the unexpected death of co-leader Rod Donald, saying that it made sense to "appoint an out-of-Parliament leader, rather than stretch the sitting MPs even further." In contrast to his leadership rivals, Clendon characterised himself as a left-wing conservative. Norman won the leadership after a vote at a party AGM in June 2006.

Clendon contested the Helensville electorate for the Green Party in the 2008 general election and was ranked 10th on the party list. The party won nine MPs, so he was the highest-ranked Green Party candidate not to be elected.

== Member of Parliament ==
New Zealand Parliament
Years	Term	Electorate	List	Party
2009–2011	49th	List	10	Green
2011–2014	50th	List	8	Green
2014–2017	51st	List	11	Green

Green MP Sue Bradford resigned her seat in Parliament after she lost the party's co-leadership election to Metiria Turei in 2009. As Clendon was next on the party list, he became a Member of Parliament on 2 November 2009 and delivered his maiden speech to Parliament on 17 November.

A private member's bill in Clendon's name was drawn from the ballot in February 2010. The Smart Meters (Consumer Choice) Bill would require that domestic power users be advised on the options available for the use of smart meters in their homes. It was voted down by the Government later that year.

In the 2011 election, Clendon unsuccessfully contested the Mount Albert electorate but was re-elected as a list MP, ranked eighth. Having moved to Kerikeri in 2012, he stood in the Northland electorate at the 2014 election and was re-elected as a list MP, ranked 11th. He did not contest the 2015 Northland by-election, but was planning to stand in the seat again in the 2017 election and was ranked 16th on the party list.

During his Parliamentary career, Clendon sat on the Auckland governance legislation committee, the commerce committee, and the law and order committee. He was deputy musterer (whip) of the Green Party from 2010 to 2011 and musterer from 2014 to 2017. He was the Green Party spokesperson for corrections for his entire tenure, as well as spokesperson for police (2014–2017), courts (2011–2017), small business, tertiary education and tourism (2011–2014), and resource management reform (2009–2011). As corrections spokesperson, Clendon held the position that New Zealand's punitive, tough-on-crime approach to the corrections system did not work and led to overcrowded prisons. In 2017, he criticised the corrections department for paying working inmates below the minimum wage.

Clendon voted against approving Easter trading in 2009 and 2016, in favour of retaining the minimum age for purchasing alcohol at 18 in 2012, and in favour of legalising same-sex marriage in 2014.

On 7 August 2017, Clendon and fellow Green Party MP Kennedy Graham announced that they were planning to resign as Green Party candidates for the 2017 election, after revelations that co-leader Metiria Turei committed benefit and electoral fraud. Graham and Clendon stated that their resignations were due to the public positions she had taken regarding her offending, and her subsequent refusal to step down from her leadership role. The next day, both Clendon and Graham resigned from the party caucus and as candidates, after there were moves to remove them involuntarily. On 9 August 2017, Turei resigned as co-leader of the party and as a list candidate for the 2017 election. Clendon did not ask to be reinstated after Turei's departure. He did not give a valedictory statement and left Parliament at the September 23 election.

== Local government political career ==
Far North district councillor Willow-Jean Prime resigned her position in September 2017 after being elected to Parliament as a Labour list MP. Clendon unsuccessfully contested the vacancy in a 2018 by-election, but was successful in seeking a councillor role in the council's Bay of Islands–Whangaroa ward at the 2019 local elections. Prior to his election, Clendon was chair of Vision Kerikeri, a community development organisation and lobby group, from 2018 to 2019.

On council, Clendon voted in support of Māori wards in the Far North and criticised the government's Three Waters reforms for not being able to promise that water infrastructure would be able to remain in public ownership. He retired in 2022 after completing one term and took a position as regional coordinator for the Tohu Whenua visitor programme in February 2024.

== Notes ==
Party political offices
Preceded by Richard Davies	Co-convenor of the Green Party; 2001–2004; Served alongside: Catherine Delahunty	Succeeded by Paul de Spa
