= Mitzi Nairn =

Rights and tangata tiriti advocate in New Zealand (1942–2023)

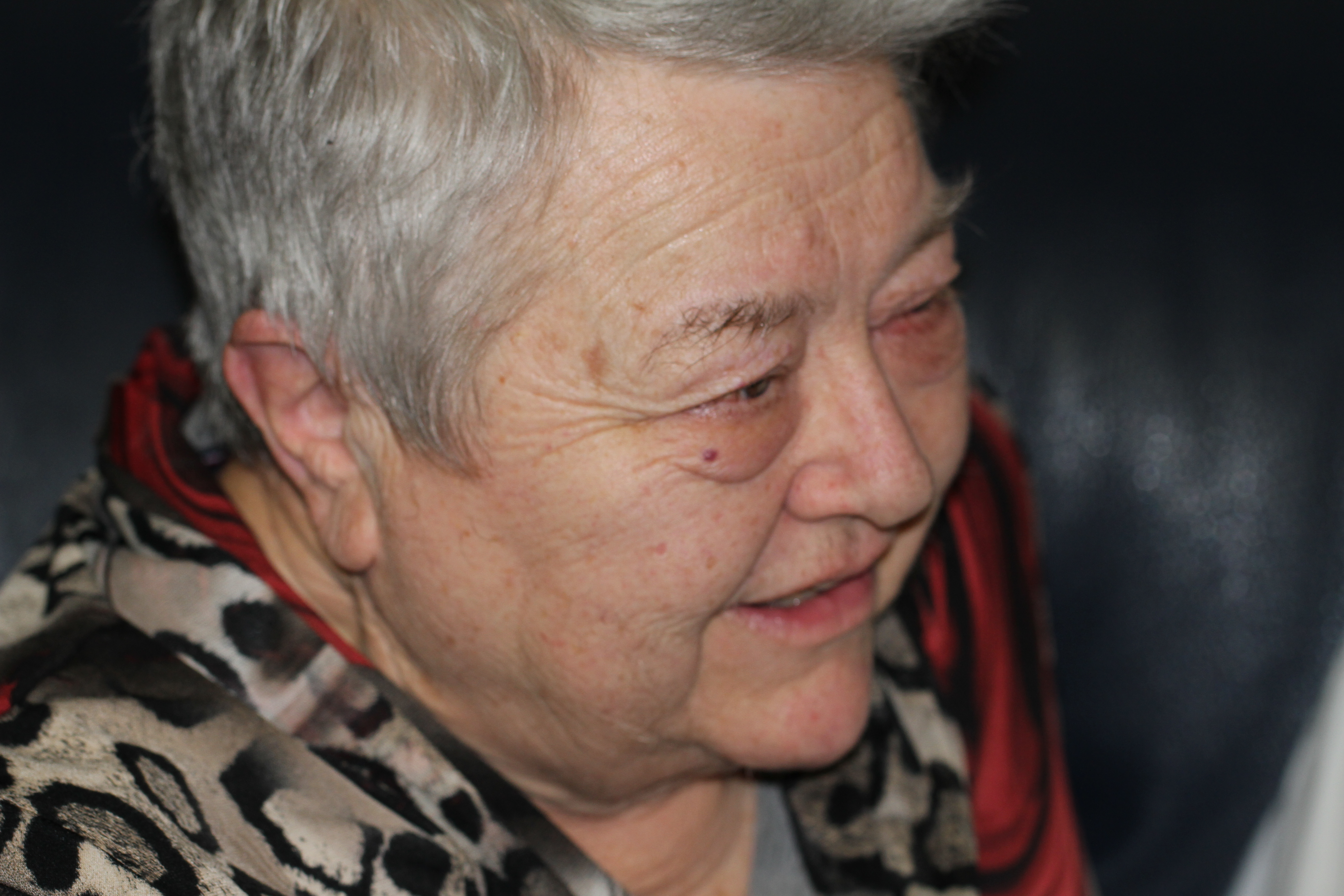
- Born: Elizabeth Frances Nairn; 1942; London
- Died: December 17, 2023 (aged 80–81)
- Known for: Women's rights and anti-racist activism

Elizabeth Frances (Mitzi) Nairn (1942–2023) was a feminist and an anti-racist activist in New Zealand. She was a founding member of Auckland Committee on Racism and Discrimination (ACORD) and Tāmaki Treaty Workers, and part of setting up Project Waitangi/Network Waitangi.

== Early life ==
Nairn was born in London in 1942 and came to New Zealand when she was four years old. Her mother was an English migrant to New Zealand with unorthodox views about New Zealand's past which influenced Nairn. She went to school in a rural area in New Zealand.

== Community contributions ==
She started being active in anti-racism activism in New Zealand in the 1960s. Nairn was part of the Student Christian Movement in New Zealand which according to Nairn involved discussions about social change and revolution including South American liberation struggles. She was a Christian feminist, and she and others started a magazine in 1978 called Vashti's Voice that supported a 'national feminist spirituality network'. Nairn became the Director of Programme on Racism of the Conference of Churches in Aotearoa NZ, (formerly the National Council of Churches).

Nairn was a founding member of the Auckland Committee on Racism and Discrimination (ACORD), a non-Māori group working with Māori which started in the early 1970s. Nairn attended Te Reo Mihi marae, Te Hāpua in 1977 along with other members. She was a founding member of Tāmaki Tiriti Workers.

In 2010 Nairn recorded a series of interviews with Jen Margaret about social justice and liberation.

Nairn has taught many Treaty of Waitangi workshops across New Zealand.

Nairn was a speaker at a rally supporting Māori fishing rights under the Treaty of Waitangi organised by Halt All Racist Tours (HART), ACORD, Pākehā coalition against racism (PCAR) and others. Other speakers were Peter Turei, Milton Hohaia, Waatara Black and Archdeacon John Mullane. In the early 1990s Nairn outlined thinking and methodology of Paulo Freire as a strong influence amongst herself and other activists.

In 2011 Nairn said... "there is hope for Pākehā like me that this country could be a place to be proud of - for its social policies, its inclusiveness, its biodiversity and conservation, its research and development, and its thriving economy, all under Te Tiriti o Waitangi."

As an influence on others Catherine Delahunty described her as "a great teacher and Pākehā anti-racism pioneer" (2021).

== Death ==
Nairn died on Sunday, 17 December 2023.

== Selected publications ==
- Nairn, M. (1989). Changing my mind - transitions in Pakeha thinking. In H. Yensen, et al. (Eds.), Honouring the Treaty: An introduction for Pakeha to the Treaty of Waitangi. Auckland: Penguin Books.
- Nairn, M. (1990). Some liberation theory. In J. Margaret (Ed.), Pakeha Treaty work: Unpublished material (2002) (pp. 201–202). Manukau, New Zealand: Manukau Institute of Technology Treaty Unit.
- Nairn, M. (1990). Understanding colonisation. Auckland: Workshop material distributed by CCANZ Programme on Racism.
- Nairn, R., & McCreanor, T. (1990). Insensitivity and hypersensitivity: an imbalance in Pakeha accounts of racial conflict. Journal of Language and Social Psychology, 9(4), 293–308. 311
- Nairn, R., & McCreanor, T. (1991). Race talk and commonsense: patterns in Pakeha discourse on Maori/Pakeha relation in New Zealand. Journal of Language and Social Psychology, 10(4), 245–262.
- Nairn, M. (1992). Changing and adapting. In M. Nairn (Ed.), Programme on Racism collected newsletters 1985-2002 (Vol 27, pp. 1–2). Auckland: Treaty Conference Publications Group.
- Nairn, R., & The National Standing Committee on Bicultural Issues (NSCBI). (1997). Cultural justice and ethics in psychological practice. In H. Love & W. Whittaker (Eds.), Practice issues for clinical and applied psychologists in New Zealand (pp. 127–135). Wellington: The New Zealand Psychological Society.
- Nairn, M. (2000). The future of the Treaty of Waitangi. In I. Huygens et al. (Eds.), Proceedings of Treaty Conference 2000 (pp. 9–13). Auckland: Treaty Publications Group.
- Nairn, M. (2001). Decolonisation for Pakeha. In J. Margaret (Ed.), Pakeha Treaty work: Unpublished material (2002) (pp. 203–208). Manukau, New Zealand: Manukau Institute of Technology Treaty Unit.
- Nairn, M. (Ed.). (2002). Programme on Racism collected newsletters 1985 -2002. Auckland: Treaty Conference Publications Group, Private Bag 47904, Ponsonby, Auckland.
- Nairn, R. (2007). Ethical principles and cultural justice in psychological practice. In I. Evan, J. Rucklidge & M. O'Driscoll (Eds.), Professional practice of psychology in Aotearoa New Zealand. Wellington: New Zealand Psychological Society.
