= Harmony Network NZ =

HARMONY Network NZ
- Leader: Sophia Xiao-Colley
- Founded: 31 August 2020
- Ideology: Environmentalism; Autonomism
- House of Representatives: 0 / 120

HARMONY Network NZ (acronym for Happiness, Autonomy, Resilience, Motivation, Opportunity, Nature and Young) was an unregistered political party in New Zealand. According to a press release from the party, it was environmentalist and supports happiness and autonomy.

The party contested one electorate in the 2020 New Zealand general election; Sophia Xiao-Colley, in Northland She received 28 votes, coming last out of twelve candidates. It did not field any candidates in the 2023 general election.
