= Northland (electorate) =

- Single-member general constituency for the New Zealand House of Representatives
- Interactive map of boundaries from the 2026 election
- Formation: 1996
- Region: Northland
- Character: Rural
- Term: 3 years

Member for Northland
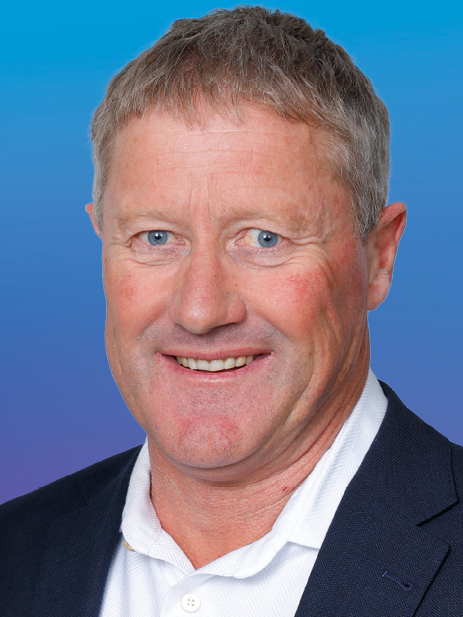
- Grant McCallum since 14 October 2023
- Party: National
- List MPs: Mark Cameron (ACT); Shane Jones (NZ First); Willow-Jean Prime (Labour)
- Previous MP: Willow-Jean Prime (Labour)
Party vote distribution

Northland is a New Zealand parliamentary electorate, returning one Member of Parliament to the New Zealand House of Representatives. The electorate was established for the 1996 election. It was represented by National Party MP John Carter from 1996 to 2011, and then National's Mike Sabin until his resignation on 30 January 2015. The by-election in March 2015 was won by New Zealand First party leader Winston Peters. Peters was defeated by National's Matt King in the 2017 general election. King in turn was defeated by the Labour Party's Willow-Jean Prime in the 2020 general election, who became the first Labour MP elected for the area since the party won the predecessor electorate Bay of Islands in 1938. Prime was later defeated in the 2023 election by National's Grant McCallum.

== Population centres ==
Map of boundaries at the 2020 and 2023 general elections

Northland is the northernmost general electorate of New Zealand. The electorate encompasses the entire Far North District and Kaipara District, and a small rural section of Whangarei District. At the 2008 election, the town of Wellsford became part of Northland due to heavy population growth in the Rodney seat. No boundary adjustments were undertaken in the subsequent 2013/14 redistribution. At the 2019/20 review, the seat lost Wellsford to the new electorate of Kaipara ki Mahurangi, but gained Poroti and Maungakaramea from Whangārei. At the 2025 review, the electorate lost the rural communities between Whangaruru and Whananaki to Whangārei.

- Taipa Bay-Mangonui (2,050)
- Kaitaia (6,170)
- Kerikeri (8,380)
- Paihia (1,640)
- Opua (860)
- Haruru Falls (870)
- Kawakawa (1,500)
- Moerewa (1,930)
- Kaikohe (4,720)
- Dargaville (5,170)
- Mangawhai Heads (1,086)

== History ==
The Northland electorate was created ahead of the introduction of mixed-member proportional voting in the 1996 election. It was formed from the whole of the Far North electorate (called Bay of Islands before 1993), and a large section of the Hobson seat.

Former Bay of Islands and then Far North MP John Carter of the National Party was elected MP for Northland in 1996, and was returned at every election until the 2008 election. Carter left Parliament in June 2011 to take up a post as New Zealand's High Commissioner to the Cook Islands. His departure did not result in a by-election, as the vacancy occurred within six months of the next general election.

In May 2011 Mike Sabin was selected as the National Party candidate in place of Carter. Sabin had a majority of 11,362 and 9,300 votes in 2011 and 2014, respectively. In December 2014 news media reported that he was under investigation by police over an assault complaint. The reports were not confirmed by the New Zealand Police, the Prime Minister or Sabin himself. Sabin resigned from parliament on 30 January 2015 with immediate effect "due to personal issues that were best dealt with outside Parliament." The resignation forced a by-election in the electorate.

The by-election in March 2015 was won by New Zealand First party leader Winston Peters. Peters was later defeated by National's Matt King in the 2017 general election.

The electorate is one where National traditionally performs well; Labour did not win a general electorate north of Wellsford in any election from 1943 to 2017 besides a one-off victory in Whangarei in 1972. However, in the 2020 election, Northland elected its first ever Labour MP and the first Labour MP for the area for 77 years.

The upper North Island is also a place where New Zealand First has one of its strongest voter bases; in 1996, Ian Peters and Frank Grover of the Alliance beat Labour's candidate into fourth place and nine percent of the vote. Third parties do well in Northland – at the 1960 and 1963 elections, Social Credit candidate Vernon Cracknell came runner up in Hobson, before taking the seat with 48 percent of the vote in 1966. The area had previously been receptive to social credit theory – Harold Rushworth of the credit-influenced Country Party had held Bay of Islands for three terms, from 1928 to 1938.

=== Members of Parliament ===
Key

| National | NZ First | Alliance |
| Christian Heritage | Green | Labour |
ACT

| Election | Winner |
|---|---|
| 1996 election | John Carter |
| 1999 election | John Carter |
| 2002 election | John Carter |
| 2005 election | John Carter |
| 2008 election | John Carter |
| 2011 election | Mike Sabin |
| 2014 election | Mike Sabin |
| 2015 by-election | Winston Peters |
| 2017 election | Matt King |
| 2020 election | Willow-Jean Prime |
| 2023 election | Grant McCallum |

=== List MPs ===
Members of Parliament elected from party lists in elections where that person also unsuccessfully contested the Northland electorate. Unless otherwise stated, all MPs terms began and ended at general elections.

| Election | Winner |
|---|---|
| 1996 election | Frank Grover^{1} |
| 1999 election | Sue Bradford |
| 2002 election | Jim Peters |
| 2005 election | Shane Jones |
| 2008 election | Shane Jones |
| 2014 election | David Clendon |
| 2017 election | Winston Peters |
| 2017 election | Willow-Jean Prime |
| 2020 election | Mark Cameron |
| 2023 election | Mark Cameron |
| 2023 election | Shane Jones |
| 2023 election | Willow-Jean Prime |

^{1} Grover left the Alliance in 1999 and joined the Christian Heritage Party.

== Election results ==
=== 2026 election ===
The next election will be held on 7 November 2026. Candidates for Northland are listed at Candidates in the 2026 New Zealand general election by electorate § Northland. Official results will be available after 27 November 2026.

=== 2023 election ===
2023 general election: Northland
| Notes: | Blue background denotes the winner of the electorate vote. Pink background denotes a candidate elected from their party list. Yellow background denotes an electorate win by a list member, or other incumbent. A ✓ or ✗ denotes status of any incumbent, win or lose respectively. | | | | | | |
| Party | Candidate | Votes | % | ±% | Party votes | % | ±% |
|---|---|---|---|---|---|---|---|
| National | Grant McCallum | 16,272 | 35.63 | −2.11 | 16,418 | 35.31 | +7.83 |
| Labour | ✗ Willow-Jean Prime | 10,185 | 22.30 | −15.81 | 10,211 | 21.96 | −22.02 |
| NZ First | Shane Jones | 8,143 | 17.83 | +6.40 | 6,523 | 14.03 | +8.20 |
| DemocracyNZ | Matt King | 3,812 | 8.35 | — | 784 | 1.69 | — |
| Green | Reina Tuai Penney | 2,424 | 5.31 | +1.40 | 3,705 | 7.97 | +1.87 |
| ACT | Mark Cameron | 2,135 | 4.67 | +1.81 | 4,729 | 10.17 | +0.66 |
| NZ Loyal | Michael Feyen | 1,331 | 2.91 | — | 1,529 | 3.29 | — |
| Legalise Cannabis | Jeff Lye | 677 | 1.48 | — | 307 | 0.66 | +0.01 |
| Independent | Mike Finlayson | 369 | 0.81 | — | | | |
| Te Pāti Māori | | | | | 716 | 1.54 | +1.14 |
| Opportunities | | | | | 577 | 1.24 | +0.52 |
| NewZeal | | | | | 280 | 0.60 | — |
| Freedoms NZ | | | | | 208 | 0.45 | — |
| Animal Justice | | | | | 114 | 0.25 | — |
| New Nation | | | | | 64 | 0.14 | — |
| Leighton Baker Party | | | | | 57 | 0.12 | — |
| New Conservatives | | | | | 64 | 0.14 | −1.71 |
| Women's Rights | | | | | 26 | 0.09 | — |
| Informal votes | | 326 | | | 161 | | |
| Total valid votes | | 45,674 | | | 46,488 | | |
| Turnout | | | | | | | |
| National gain from Labour | Majority | 6,087 | 13.33 | | | | |

=== 2020 election ===
2020 general election: Northland
| Notes: | Blue background denotes the winner of the electorate vote. Pink background denotes a candidate elected from their party list. Yellow background denotes an electorate win by a list member, or other incumbent. A ✓ or ✗ denotes status of any incumbent, win or lose respectively. | | | | | | |
| Party | Candidate | Votes | % | ±% | Party votes | % | ±% |
|---|---|---|---|---|---|---|---|
| Labour | Willow-Jean Prime | 17,066 | 38.11 | +16.50 | 19,997 | 43.98 | +13.86 |
| National | ✗ Matt King | 16,903 | 37.74 | −0.56 | 12,496 | 27.48 | −18.87 |
| NZ First | Shane Jones | 5,119 | 11.43 | −23.38 | 2,651 | 5.83 | −7.24 |
| Green | Darleen Tana Hoff-Neilson | 1,749 | 3.91 | −0.60 | 2,772 | 6.10 | +0.05 |
| ACT | Mark Cameron | 1,279 | 2.86 | +2.56 | 4,326 | 9.51 | +9.04 |
| Advance NZ | Nathan Mitchell | 847 | 1.89 | — | 949 | 2.09 | — |
| New Conservative | Trevor Barfoote | 686 | 1.53 | +1.07 | 842 | 1.85 | +1.48 |
| Independent | Mike Shaw | 480 | 1.07 | — | | | |
| Opportunities | Helen Jeremiah | 326 | 0.73 | — | 326 | 0.72 | −1.26 |
| Outdoors | Michele Mitcalfe | 219 | 0.49 | — | 106 | 0.23 | +0.16 |
| Social Credit | Brad Flutey | 82 | 0.18 | — | 69 | 0.15 | +0.09 |
| Harmony Network NZ | Sophia Xiao-Colley | 28 | 0.06 | — | | | |
| Legalise Cannabis | | | | | 294 | 0.65 | +0.25 |
| ONE | | | | | 248 | 0.55 | — |
| Māori Party | | | | | 181 | 0.40 | +0.07 |
| Sustainable NZ | | | | | 37 | 0.08 | — |
| Vision NZ | | | | | 30 | 0.07 | — |
| TEA | | | | | 6 | 0.01 | — |
| Heartland | | | | | 3 | 0.01 | — |
| Informal votes | | 646 | | | 363 | | |
| Total valid votes | | 44,784 | | | 45,467 | | |
| Turnout | | 45,604 | 84.10 | +2.61 | | | |
| Labour gain from National | Majority | 163 | 0.37 | +17.06 | | | |

=== 2017 election ===
2017 general election: Northland
| Notes: | Blue background denotes the winner of the electorate vote. Pink background denotes a candidate elected from their party list. Yellow background denotes an electorate win by a list member, or other incumbent. A ✓ or ✗ denotes status of any incumbent, win or lose respectively. | | | | | | |
| Party | Candidate | Votes | % | ±% | Party votes | % | ±% |
|---|---|---|---|---|---|---|---|
| National | Matt King | 15,243 | 38.30 | −14.44 | 18,834 | 46.35 | −2.62 |
| NZ First | ✗ Winston Peters | 13,854 | 34.81 | — | 5,353 | 13.17 | +0.38 |
| Labour | Willow-Jean Prime | 8,599 | 21.61 | −4.28 | 12,243 | 30.12 | +13.50 |
| Green | Peter Hughes | 1,794 | 4.51 | −6.00 | 2,458 | 6.05 | −4.79 |
| Conservative | Mel Taylor | 185 | 0.46 | −4.03 | 149 | 0.37 | −5.94 |
| ACT | Craig Nelson | 121 | 0.30 | −0.28 | 191 | 0.47 | +0.01 |
| Opportunities | | | | | 806 | 1.98 | — |
| Legalise Cannabis | | | | | 200 | 0.49 | −0.05 |
| Māori Party | | | | | 133 | 0.33 | −0.26 |
| Mana Party | | | | | 119 | 0.29 | −1.40 (Note: 2017 Mana Party swing is relative to the votes for Internet-Mana in 2014; it shared a party list with the Internet Party in the 2014 election) |
| Ban 1080 | | | | | 50 | 0.12 | −0.02 |
| Outdoors | | | | | 27 | 0.07 | — |
| Democrats | | | | | 25 | 0.06 | −0.12 |
| People's Party | | | | | 25 | 0.06 | — |
| United Future | | | | | 22 | 0.05 | −0.15 |
| Internet | | | | | 1 | 0.002 | −1.69 (Note: 2017 Internet Party swing is relative to the votes for Internet-Mana in 2014; it shared a party list with Mana Party in the 2014 election) |
| Informal votes | | 306 | | | 149 | | |
| Total valid votes | | 39,796 | | | 40,636 | | |
| Turnout | | 40,785 | | | | | |
| National gain from NZ First | Majority | 1,389 | 3.49 | −23.36 | | | |

=== 2015 by-election ===
The following table shows final by-election results:

2015 Northland by-election
Notes: Blue background denotes the winner of the by-election. Pink background denotes a candidate elected from their party list prior to the by-election. Yellow background denotes the winner of the by-election, who was a list MP prior to the by-election. A ✓ or ✗ denotes status of any incumbent, win or lose respectively.
| Party | Candidate | Votes | % | ±% |
|---|---|---|---|---|
| NZ First | Winston Peters | 16,089 | 54.45 | +54.45 |
| National | Mark Osborne | 11,648 | 39.42 | −13.32 |
| Labour | Willow-Jean Prime | 1,380 | 4.67 | −21.22 |
| Focus | Joe Carr | 113 | 0.38 | −4.41 |
| Legalise Cannabis | Maki Herbert | 94 | 0.32 | +0.32 |
| ACT | Robin Grieve | 68 | 0.23 | −0.35 |
| Mana Party | Reuben Porter | 60 | 0.20 | +0.20 |
| Climate | Rob Painting | 39 | 0.13 | +0.13 |
| Independent | Bruce Rogan | 24 | 0.08 | +0.08 |
| Independent | Adrian Bonner | 17 | 0.06 | +0.06 |
| Independent | Adam Holland | 16 | 0.05 | +0.05 |
| Informal votes | | 42 | 0.14 | −1.05 |
| Total Valid votes | | 29,548 | | |
| Turnout | | 29,590 | 64.39 | −14.51 |
| Registered electors | | 45,955 | | |
| NZ First gain from National | Majority | 4,441 | 15.03 | |

=== 2014 election ===
2014 general election: Northland
| Notes: | Blue background denotes the winner of the electorate vote. Pink background denotes a candidate elected from their party list. Yellow background denotes an electorate win by a list member, or other incumbent. A ✓ or ✗ denotes status of any incumbent, win or lose respectively. | | | | | | |
| Party | Candidate | Votes | % | ±% | Party votes | % | ±% |
|---|---|---|---|---|---|---|---|
| National | ✓ Mike Sabin | 18,269 | 52.74 | −4.81 | 17,412 | 48.97 | −1.17 |
| Labour | Willow-Jean Prime | 8,969 | 25.89 | +4.30 | 5,913 | 16.63 | −0.97 |
| Green | David Clendon | 3,639 | 10.51 | −1.59 | 3,855 | 10.84 | −0.94 |
| Focus | Ken Rintoul | 1,661 | 4.80 | +4.80 | 216 | 0.61 | +0.61 |
| Conservative | Melanie Taylor | 1,555 | 4.49 | −0.59 | 2,243 | 6.31 | +1.06 |
| ACT | Craig Nelson | 200 | 0.58 | −0.25 | 162 | 0.46 | −1.19 |
| Democrats | David Angus Wilson | 173 | 0.50 | +0.50 | 64 | 0.18 | +0.07 |
| Independent | Murray Robertson | 96 | 0.28 | +0.28 | | | |
| Money Free | Jordan Osmaston | 75 | 0.22 | +0.22 | | | |
| NZ First | | | | | 4,546 | 12.79 | +2.59 |
| Internet Mana | | | | | 601 | 1.69 | +0.40 (Note: 2014 Internet Mana swing is relative to the votes for Mana in 2011; it shared a party list with Internet in the 2014 election.) |
| Māori Party | | | | | 210 | 0.59 | −0.20 |
| Legalise Cannabis | | | | | 193 | 0.54 | −0.11 |
| United Future | | | | | 71 | 0.20 | −0.26 |
| Ban 1080 | | | | | 51 | 0.14 | +0.14 |
| Independent Coalition | | | | | 9 | 0.03 | +0.03 |
| Civilian | | | | | 7 | 0.02 | +0.02 |
| Informal votes | | 419 | | | 154 | | |
| Total valid votes | | 34,637 | | | 35,553 | | |
| Turnout | | 35,553 | 78.90 | +4.97 | | | |
| National hold | Majority | 9,300 | 26.85 | −9.10 | | | |

=== 2011 election ===
2011 general election: Northland
| Notes: | Blue background denotes the winner of the electorate vote. Pink background denotes a candidate elected from their party list. Yellow background denotes an electorate win by a list member, or other incumbent. A ✓ or ✗ denotes status of any incumbent, win or lose respectively. | | | | | | |
| Party | Candidate | Votes | % | ±% | Party votes | % | ±% |
|---|---|---|---|---|---|---|---|
| National | Mike Sabin | 18,188 | 57.55 | −1.59 | 16,381 | 50.15 | −1.55 |
| Labour | Lynette Stewart | 6,826 | 21.60 | −7.64 | 5,748 | 17.60 | −7.44 |
| Green | Pauline Evans | 3,822 | 12.09 | +5.22 | 3,848 | 11.78 | +4.44 |
| Conservative | Melanie Taylor | 1,606 | 5.08 | +5.08 | 1,714 | 5.25 | +5.25 |
| Mana | Ngawai Herewini | 611 | 1.93 | +1.93 | 420 | 1.29 | +1.29 |
| Māori Party | Josephine Peita | 290 | 0.92 | +0.92 | 257 | 0.79 | −0.69 |
| ACT | Barry Brill | 261 | 0.83 | −0.85 | 536 | 1.64 | −2.57 |
| NZ First | | | | | 3,330 | 10.19 | +3.79 |
| Legalise Cannabis | | | | | 213 | 0.65 | +0.23 |
| United Future | | | | | 149 | 0.46 | −0.21 |
| Democrats | | | | | 35 | 0.11 | −0.03 |
| Libertarianz | | | | | 25 | 0.08 | +0.004 |
| Alliance | | | | | 9 | 0.03 | −0.05 |
| Informal votes | | 972 | | | 308 | | |
| Total valid votes | | 31,604 | | | 32,665 | | |
| National hold | Majority | 11,362 | 35.95 | +6.05 | | | |

Electorate (as at 26 November 2011): 44,182

=== 2008 election ===
2008 general election: Northland
| Notes: | Blue background denotes the winner of the electorate vote. Pink background denotes a candidate elected from their party list. Yellow background denotes an electorate win by a list member, or other incumbent. A ✓ or ✗ denotes status of any incumbent, win or lose respectively. | | | | | | |
| Party | Candidate | Votes | % | ±% | Party votes | % | ±% |
|---|---|---|---|---|---|---|---|
| National | ✓ John Carter | 19,889 | 59.14 | | 17,703 | 51.70 | |
| Labour | Shane Jones | 9,835 | 29.24 | | 8,573 | 25.04 | |
| Green | Martin Leiding | 2,311 | 6.87 | | 2,514 | 7.34 | |
| ACT | Alan (Smilie) Wood | 565 | 1.68 | | 1,443 | 4.21 | |
| Kiwi | Mike Shaw | 381 | 1.13 | | 216 | 0.63 | |
| Family Party | Melanie Taylor | 319 | 0.95 | | 162 | 0.47 | |
| Democrats | David Wilson | 171 | 0.51 | | 48 | 0.14 | |
| United Future | Phil Johnson | 162 | 0.48 | | 228 | 0.67 | |
| NZ First | | | | | 2,194 | 6.41 | |
| Māori Party | | | | | 507 | 1.48 | |
| Progressive | | | | | 258 | 0.75 | |
| Bill and Ben | | | | | 153 | 0.45 | |
| Legalise Cannabis | | | | | 144 | 0.42 | |
| Alliance | | | | | 28 | 0.08 | |
| Libertarianz | | | | | 25 | 0.07 | |
| Pacific | | | | | 17 | 0.05 | |
| Workers Party | | | | | 16 | 0.05 | |
| RAM | | | | | 6 | 0.02 | |
| RONZ | | | | | 5 | 0.01 | |
| Informal votes | | 310 | | | 132 | | |
| Total valid votes | | 33,633 | | | 34,240 | | |
| National hold | Majority | 10,054 | | | | | |

=== 2005 election ===
2005 general election: Northland
| Notes: | Blue background denotes the winner of the electorate vote. Pink background denotes a candidate elected from their party list. Yellow background denotes an electorate win by a list member, or other incumbent. A ✓ or ✗ denotes status of any incumbent, win or lose respectively. | | | | | | |
| Party | Candidate | Votes | % | ±% | Party votes | % | ±% |
|---|---|---|---|---|---|---|---|
| National | ✓ John Carter | 16,577 | 54.12 | | 14,182 | 45.69 | |
| Labour | Shane Jones | 7,302 | 23.84 | | 9,384 | 30.23 | |
| Green | Sue Bradford | 2,764 | 9.02 | | 2,000 | 6.44 | |
| NZ First | Jim Peters | 2,547 | 8.32 | | 3,162 | 10.19 | |
| Māori Party | Malcolm Peri | 550 | 1.80 | | 484 | 1.56 | |
| United Future | Phil Johnson | 315 | 1.03 | | 618 | 1.99 | |
| Destiny | David Isaachsen | 278 | 0.91 | | 196 | 0.63 | |
| ACT | Tom McClelland | 216 | 0.71 | | 474 | 1.53 | |
| Libertarianz | Julian Pistorius | 51 | 0.17 | | 27 | 0.09 | |
| Independent | Gray Phillips | 18 | 0.06 | | | | |
| Direct Democracy | Mel Whaanga | 10 | 0.03 | | 5 | 0.02 | |
| Progressive | | | | | 272 | 0.88 | |
| Legalise Cannabis | | | | | 94 | 0.30 | |
| Democrats | | | | | 48 | 0.015 | |
| Christian Heritage | | | | | 37 | 0.12 | |
| Alliance | | | | | 27 | 0.09 | |
| 99 MP | | | | | 11 | 0.04 | |
| Family Rights | | | | | 6 | 0.02 | |
| One NZ | | | | | 6 | 0.02 | |
| RONZ | | | | | 6 | 0.02 | |
| Informal votes | | 233 | | | 133 | | |
| Total valid votes | | 30,628 | | | 31,039 | | |
| National hold | Majority | 9,275 | 30.28 | | | | |

=== 2002 election ===
2002 general election: Northland
| Notes: | Blue background denotes the winner of the electorate vote. Pink background denotes a candidate elected from their party list. Yellow background denotes an electorate win by a list member, or other incumbent. A ✓ or ✗ denotes status of any incumbent, win or lose respectively. | | | | | | |
| Party | Candidate | Votes | % | ±% | Party votes | % | ±% |
|---|---|---|---|---|---|---|---|
| National | ✓ John Carter | 13,060 | 46.03 | | 6,523 | 22.78 | |
| Labour | Rachel Rose | 8,445 | 19.39 | | 8,445 | 29.49 | |
| NZ First | Jim Peters | 4,381 | 15.44 | | 5,428 | 18.95 | |
| Green | Janine McVeagh | 2,503 | 8.82 | | 2,651 | 9.26 | |
| United Future | Mike Mitcalfe | 799 | 2.81 | | 1,656 | 5.78 | |
| ACT | Alan Wood | 609 | 2.14 | | 2,106 | 7.35 | |
| Christian Heritage | Ned Jack | 479 | 1.69 | | 476 | 1.66 | |
| Progressive | Peter Kane | 337 | 1.19 | | 424 | 1.48 | |
| Legalise Cannabis | Judy Daniels | 301 | 1.06 | | 152 | 0.53 | |
| Alliance | John Donoghue | 168 | 0.59 | | 232 | 0.81 | |
| ORNZ | | | | | 383 | 1.34 | |
| One NZ | | | | | 23 | 0.08 | |
| Mana Māori | | | | | 13 | 0.05 | |
| NMP | | | | | 4 | 0.01 | |
| Informal votes | | 234 | | | 121 | | |
| Total valid votes | | 28,373 | | | 28,637 | | |
| Turnout | | | | | | | |
| National hold | Majority | 7,558 | 27.34 | | | | |

=== 1999 election ===
1999 general election: Northland
| Notes: | Blue background denotes the winner of the electorate vote. Pink background denotes a candidate elected from their party list. Yellow background denotes an electorate win by a list member, or other incumbent. A ✓ or ✗ denotes status of any incumbent, win or lose respectively. | | | | | | |
| Party | Candidate | Votes | % | ±% | Party votes | % | ±% |
|---|---|---|---|---|---|---|---|
| National | ✓ John Carter | 12,437 | 40.71 | | 6,523 | 22.78 | |
| Labour | Rachel Pose | 5,502 | 19.39 | | 8,445 | 29.49 | |

Refer to Candidates in the New Zealand general election 1999 by electorate#Northland for a list of candidates.

=== 1996 election ===
1996 general election: Northland
| Notes: | Blue background denotes the winner of the electorate vote. Pink background denotes a candidate elected from their party list. Yellow background denotes an electorate win by a list member, or other incumbent. A ✓ or ✗ denotes status of any incumbent, win or lose respectively. | | | | | | |
| Party | Candidate | Votes | % | ±% | Party votes | % | ±% |
|---|---|---|---|---|---|---|---|
| National | John Carter | 13,033 | 44.78 | | 9,665 | 33.11 | |
| NZ First | Ron Peters | 7,717 | 26.51 | | 6,348 | 21.74 | |
| Alliance | Frank Grover | 3,515 | 12.08 | | 3,207 | 10.99 | |
| Labour | Peter Pangari | 2,825 | 9.71 | | 5,741 | 19.66 | |
| Christian Coalition | Ned Jack | 738 | 2.54 | | 1,321 | 4.52 | |
| ACT | John Latimer | 589 | 2.02 | | 1,924 | 6.59 | |
| Independent | Cherry Daly | 551 | 1.89 | | | | |
| Progressive Green | Cherry Daly | 449 | 1.54 | | 116 | 0.40 | |
| McGillicuddy Serious | Dale Magnus Taylor | 212 | 0.73 | | 101 | 0.35 | |
| Natural Law | Lehigh Aroha Bush | 76 | 0.26 | | 81 | 0.28 | |
| Total valid votes | | 29,105 | | | 29,194 | | |
| Informal votes | | 190 | | | 101 | | |
| National hold | Majority | 5,316 | | | | | |

|}
