= Jen Margaret =

New Zealand education expert

Jen Margaret is an educator, researcher, and author on community and international development work based in New Zealand, her area of expertise is in education about Te Tiriti o Waitangi (Treaty of Waitangi). She is a founding member of the organisation Groundwork: Facilitating Change with the purpose to educate Pākehā (white New Zealanders) about New Zealand history.

== Early life and education ==
Margaret is Pākehā of Cornish, Scottish, Danish and German ancestry. She grew up on a farm near Leeston on the Canterbury Plains. The Māori nation of this region is Ngāi Te Ruahikihiki. Her father was a farmer and her mother was a teacher. Her great-great-grandfather was born in Scotland in 1842. His name was Joseph Hastings Doyle and he settled in New Zealand in 1864 where the town was named after him, Doyleston. Margaret's great-great-grandmother was named Bessie Roberts. Some of the land of Margaret's family was awarded to her great-great grandfather for winning a running race, although the family no longer own it.

At university in the 1990s Margaret learnt about the Treaty of Waitangi, which set her on her path as an educator in this area. Margaret has a Masters Degree from university. Her dissertation was Learning in social movements: Experiences in the Pākehā treaty workers' movement (2009) from the University of Auckland.

== Career ==
Since the 1990s Margaret has worked in community development, social justice, Te Tiriti o Waitangi implementation and building capacity in organisations. As a researcher Margaret received a Winston Churchill Fellowship (2010) and a Loxley Fellowship; she researched 'the work of non-indigenous allies in North America, Australia and Aotearoa'.

At the Treaty Conference 2000, Margaret and Christine Herzog spoke in a session titled Manukau Institute of Technology: Te Tiriti in Tertiary Education Course.

In 2010 Margaret recorded a series of interviews with Mitzi Nairn about social justice and liberation.

Margaret founded Groundwork: Facilitating Change in 2015. Groundwork is an organisation that delivers education to organisations and individuals about Te Tiriti o Waitangi / The Treaty of Waitangi. Margaret through Groundwork predominantly works with Pākehā people to help people understand how the dishonoured promises of Te Tiriti have left subsequent generations of Māori 'on the back foot'.

In addition to running workshops Margaret is a spokesperson and published an article called Becoming 'really Pākehā' on E-Tangata in 2019 and is in episode two Inheriting Privilege of the documentary series on Radio New Zealand called Land of the Long White Cloud (2019). She was a speaker at the Te Tiriti Based Futures and Anti Racism conference in 2020 alongside Julia Whaipooti and The Seed podcast in 2022.

Margaret has described a challenge for New Zealand 'to make the Pākehā side, the "Pākehā nation," an exciting and honourable place to be'.

== Publications ==
=== Books ===
- Working as allies: supporters of indigenous justice reflect (2013) - published by Auckland Workers' Educational Association (AWEA)
- Ngā rerenga o te Tiriti: community organisations engaging with the Treaty of Waitangi (2016) - published by Auckland, Aotearoa : Treaty Resource Centre
- Chapter: Jen Margaret and Heather Came, Organizing—What Do White People Need to Know to Be Effective Antiracism Allies Within Public Health? Racism: Science & Tools for the Public Health Professional. (2019)

=== Selected articles ===
- Jen Margaret; Manukau Institute of Technology Treaty Unit (2002). Pākehā treaty work: an annotated bibliography. Manukau Institute of Technology. ISBN 978-0-473-08751-7. OCLC 155793747. Wikidata Q124334058.
- Jen Margaret, Capacity Development Processes within a Social Movement: Pākehā Treaty Workers' Movement. Volume 41, Issue 3, Special Issue: Reflecting Collectively on Capacities for Change (May 2010) Pages 68–78

== Personal life ==
Margaret has a partner and a child.
