= DemocracyNZ =

New Zealand political party

- Leader: Matt King
- Founders: Matt King
- Founded: March 2022
- Registered: 13 October 2022
- Dissolved: February 2024
- Split from: National Party
- Ideology: Anti-vaccine mandate Nationalism; Right-wing populism Climate change denial
- Political position: Right-wing

Website
- democracynz.org

DemocracyNZ was a political party in New Zealand established and led by former National Party MP Matt King following the anti-vaccination occupation at parliament. It claimed to be centrist and stand for democracy, equality, and unity for New Zealanders. Its public statements were focused on opposition to New Zealand's pandemic response and to climate change regulations.

On 12 October 2022, the party's registration was approved by the Electoral Commission. It contested the 2023 New Zealand general election, receiving 0.23% of the party vote and winning no electorates, so did not enter parliament.

The party was deregistered at its own request in February 2024.

== History ==
=== Background ===
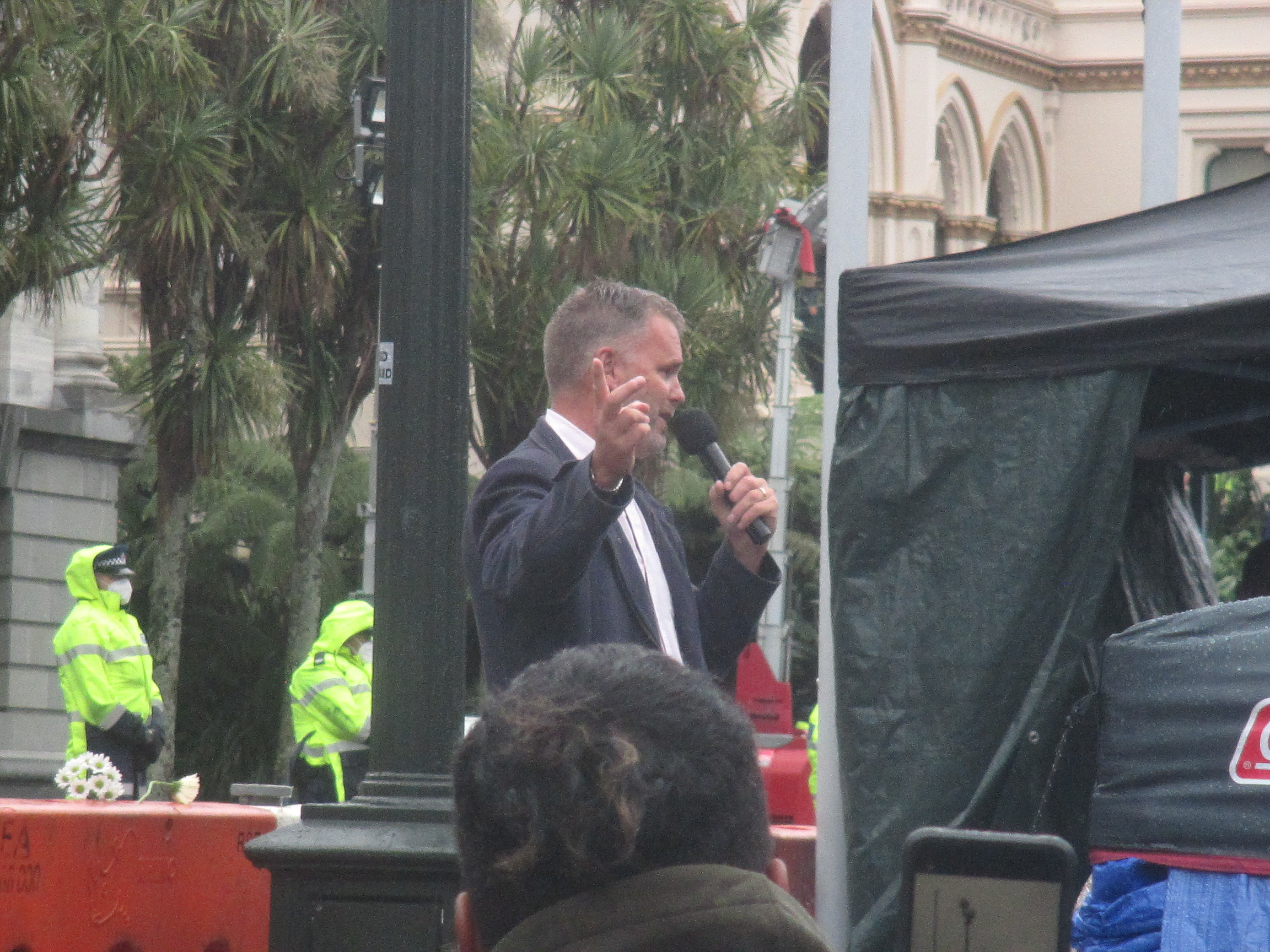
Matt King speaking at anti-vaccine mandate occupation in Wellington

Matt King first sought to be a candidate for the National Party in 2011, and was first selected by National as a candidate in the 2017 general election, to contest the Northland electorate. He won the electorate seat in that election and became a member of Parliament, serving as National's spokesperson in several roles and as a member of multiple Select Committees. He left Parliament in 2020 having lost the electorate seat and being too low on National's party list to get a list seat.

In February 2022, King announced that he would join Convoy 2022, a protest against COVID-19 vaccination mandates on Parliament's grounds. King said that his main concern was the vaccine mandates, and that the anti-vaccination component of the protest was "very small". The National Party distanced themselves from King's remarks, saying that "Matt King is no longer an MP for the National Party" and that the party "does not support the actions or the anti-vaccination messages of those involved in Convoy 2022". King said in an interview that he knew that his position could end hopes of re-selection as a National Party candidate but that he needed to stand on his principles. He later resigned from the National Party due to this position.

In May 2022, King was trespassed from Parliament grounds for two years after attending the 2022 anti-vaccine mandate protest outside Parliament. The Spinoff editor Toby Manhire criticised the Speaker of the House Trevor Mallard and the Parliament security manager Bridget Lord's decision to trespass King; opining that it violated the freedom to protest and played into the hands of anti-vaccine protesters. The trespass notice was subsequently withdrawn by the Speaker.

=== Creation, gain and loss of members ===
In March 2022, following the Parliament protests, King launched DemocracyNZ as a new political party. King said that he, Samantha-Jane Miranda, "and a handful of others got together and came up with a plan". According to King, about 2000 people signed up to become members within 48 hours of the party's launch. By October 2022, it had at least 500 members and was registered as a political party.

In June 2023, five of DemocracyNZ's announced candidates left the party. Steve Cranston, who is also a prominent member of Groundswell NZ, had discontent with the actions of senior party members, specifically with Samantha-Jane Miranda. According to Cranston, Miranda seemed in practice in charge of the party, casting out those who challenged her leadership. Following Cranston's discontent, he was de-selected as the party's Waikato candidate. Four other candidates quit in protest and released a statement saying that they did not believe the party's culture showed it could successfully make change if elected. Party president Danny Simms said that the candidates left because they were "not capable of working as team members".

According to reporter Tony Wall, DemocracyNZ "had been seen as the leading light for the so-called freedom movement' until the exodus, and many candidates, volunteers, and donors left for New Zealand First.

=== Electoral history and polling ===
The party's first opportunity to stand was in the 2022 Tauranga by-election, but King announced the party would not be contending as it was only recently formed.

The party ran 13 candidates in the 2023 general election, all of whom also contested an electorate. King said that while the party would aim to reach the 5% threshold at the next general election, he saw the most realistic option as winning his former electorate of Northland. A poll of September 2023 estimated support for King in Northland at 4 percent, making him the fourth-most popular candidate. As of June 2023, polls had shown DemocracyNZ's support to be around 1–2%.

In the 2023 general election, DemocracyNZ received 0.23% of the party vote and did not win any electorate seats, meaning it did not enter parliament. Matt King came fourth place in the Northland electorate, with 3,812 votes. 6,786 votes (0.23).

== Political positions ==
The party's public statements focused on opposition to New Zealand's response to the Covid-19 pandemic and to climate change regulations.

== Officeholders ==
=== List of leaders ===
No.	Name	Term of office	
1	Matt King	April 2022	c. February 2024

=== List of deputy leaders ===
No.	Name	Term of office	
1	Gordon Malcolm	8 September 2023	c. February 2024

== See also ==
- Advance New Zealand (2020–2021)
- Freedoms New Zealand (2022–2025)
- New Zealand Public Party (2020–2021)
