= Matt King (politician) =

New Zealand politician

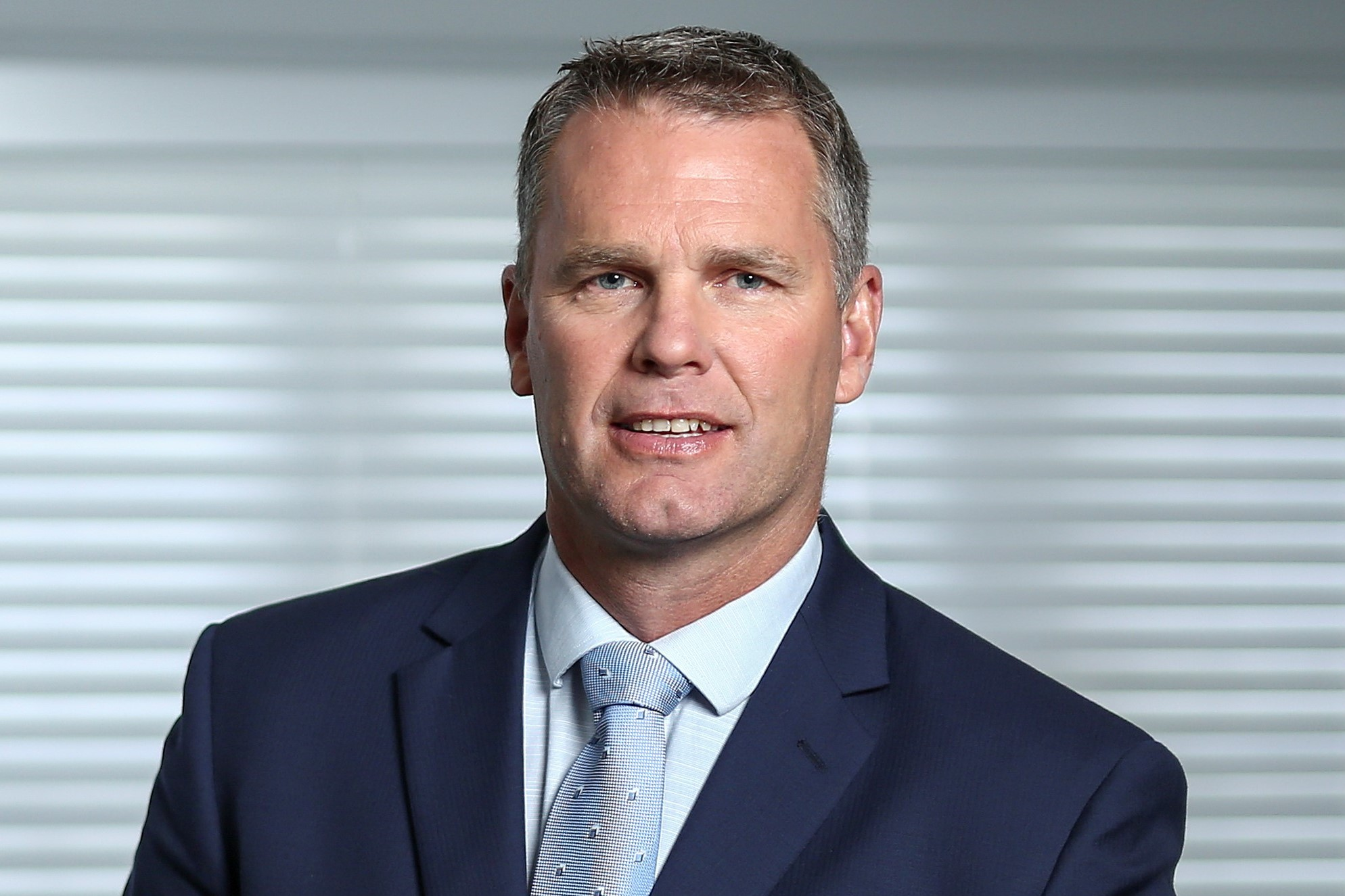

1st Leader of DemocracyNZ
- In office April 2022 – February 2024
- Preceded by: Party established
- Succeeded by: Party dissolved

Member of the New Zealand Parliament for Northland
- In office 23 September 2017 – 17 October 2020
- Preceded by: Winston Peters
- Succeeded by: Willow-Jean Prime

Personal details
- Born: Ronald Matthew King; 1967 (age 58–59)
- Party: DemocracyNZ (2022–2024); National (until 2022)

Ronald Matthew King (born 1967) is a New Zealand politician who was a Member of Parliament for the National Party from 2017 to 2020. During his time as an opposition MP, King's roles included membership of the Justice, Māori Affairs, and Transport and Infrastructure Select Committees, and National's spokesperson for Regional Development (North Island), Rural Communities, and Transport. While in parliament he promoted a bill to create a new offense for "king hits" but it was defeated.

King has posted claims about COVID-19 vaccinations being dangerous, and says he does not believe that vaccinations have actually occurred in the numbers recorded. He has downplayed the severity of COVID-19 and discussed alternative and widely debunked treatments for it. In February 2022, King attended the 2022 Wellington occupation of parliament, after which he resigned from the National Party. In March 2022 King launched a new political party called DemocracyNZ, which won 0.23% of the party vote in the 2023 general election. The party was deregistered in February 2024 at its own request.

== Personal life ==
King was born and raised in Northland, New Zealand. He graduated from the University of Auckland with a Bachelor of Science. He then worked as a police officer, first in Auckland for seven years, then as a detective in Northland. He retired from the police in 2007. Since then he has been a beef farmer at Ōkaihau and an independent fraud investigator. He has also been a volunteer firefighter. He is married and has three children. As of 2022, King lives on a farm in Ōkaihau, in the Far North, in an off-the-grid house.

== Political career ==
New Zealand Parliament
Years	Term	Electorate	List	Party
2017–2020	52nd	Northland	51	National

=== National MP ===
King first sought to be a candidate for the National Party in 2011, as well as for the 2015 Northland by-election, but the party did not select him.

National first selected him as a candidate in the 2017 general election, to contest the Northland electorate. National has generally performed well in Northland; prior to the 2015 by-election, the last time it lost the seat was in 1972. King's campaign included core infrastructure for Northland such as broadband, bridges, and roads. He also made the case that his two main competitors would enter parliament regardless on list seats. He was booed at a debate for saying that local ratepayers would have to "move on" and cover the $30 million cost from a controversial waste water scheme by the former Kaipara Council. Ultimately, King won the seat, defeating the incumbent Winston Peters. The 2017 election as a whole resulted in a Labour-led Government, and so King entered opposition.

During his time as an MP, King was a member of the Justice, Māori Affairs, and Transport and Infrastructure Select Committees. He was also at times National's spokesperson for Regional Development (North Island), Rural Communities, and Transport.

In mid-June 2020, King submitted his Crimes (Coward Punch Causing Death) Amendment Bill, which would have created a new offense for the crime of throwing a "king hit" or "coward punch", with a 20-year prison term. The campaign gained the support of professional boxer Joseph Parker and his trainer Kevin Barry. The bill was defeated on its first reading, on 17 June, by opposition from the Labour-led coalition government.

King lost his seat in parliament at the 2020 general election. Preliminary results had King retaining Northland by a margin of 729 votes over Labour's Willow-Jean Prime. However the final results, released on 6 November, showed that Prime had won by 163 votes. King announced that he would request a recount, but changed his mind the next day, having concluded that there was little chance of overturning the result. King was 40th on National's party list, and National did not receive enough party votes to go that far down its list.

=== 2022 Wellington protests ===
In February 2022, King announced that he would join Convoy 2022, a protest against COVID-19 vaccination mandates on Parliament's grounds. King said that his main concern was the vaccine mandates, and that the anti-vaccination component of the protest was "very small". The National Party distanced themselves from King's remarks, saying that "Matt King is no longer an MP for the National Party" and that the party "does not support the actions or the anti-vaccination messages of those involved in Convoy 2022." King said in an interview that he knew that his position could end hopes of re-selection as a National Party candidate but that he needed to stand on his principles. He later resigned from the National Party due to this position.

In May 2022, King was trespassed from Parliament grounds for two years after attending the 2022 anti-vaccine mandate protest outside Parliament. The Spinoff editor Toby Manhire criticised the Speaker of the House Trevor Mallard and the Parliament security manager Bridget Lord's decision to trespass King; opining that it violated the freedom to protest and played into the hands of anti-vaccine protesters. The trespass notice was subsequently withdrawn by the Speaker.

=== DemocracyNZ ===
In March 2022, following the Wellington protests, King launched a new party called DemocracyNZ. He described it as standing on a platform of "democracy, unity, freedom of choice, freedom of expression, access and inclusion" and said it sought to "uphold the Bill of Rights". According to King, about 2000 people signed up to become members within 48 hours of the party's launch.

DemocracyNZ applied for registration on 31 August 2022, which was approved on 12 October.

During the 2023 New Zealand general election, King stood as DemocracyNZ's candidate in the Northland electorate. In mid-June 2023, five of the party's 15 candidates resigned following a dispute with the party board. In response, King sought to minimise concerns about internal disarray within the party and described the resignations as "a bit of a hiccup." While campaigning in Alexandra in late June 2023, King reiterated the party's opposition to COVID-19 vaccine mandates and carbon emissions reductions. He called for voters outside his electorate to give their party vote to DemocracyNZ.

During the 2023 election held on 14 October, King came fourth place in the Northland electorate, with 3,812 votes. DemocracyNZ failed to enter Parliament, winning only 6,786 votes (0.23).

== Political views ==
=== COVID-19 ===
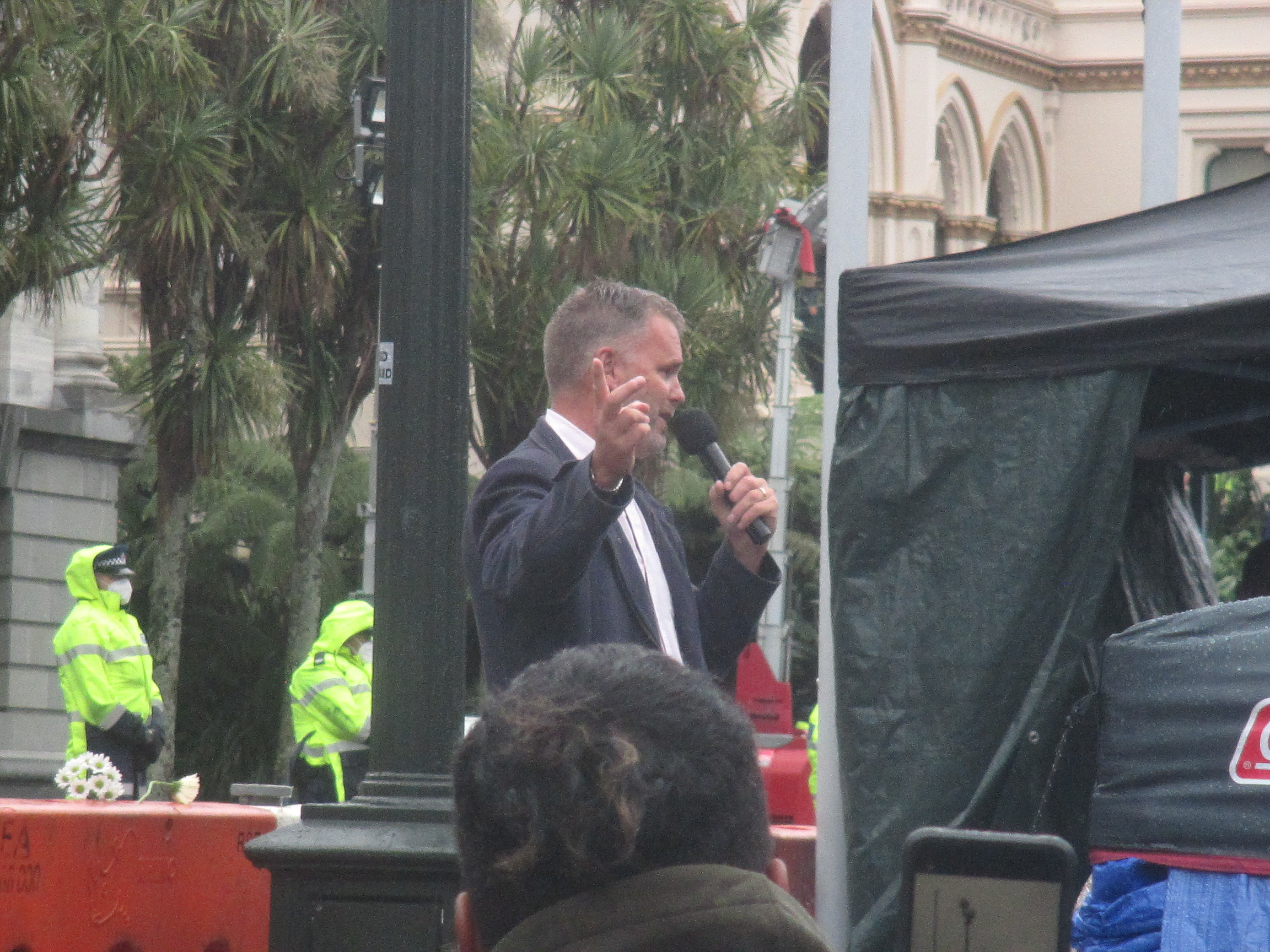
King speaks at the anti-mandate occupation on the New Zealand Parliament grounds on 12 February 2022

In May 2020, King posted a picture of himself close to family members and staff at a restaurant. When challenged if he had followed social distancing requirements, he said "I think the social distancing stuff at the stage we are at now is over the top. We haven't had any new cases in Northland for a month. I'm just using my brain as an adult and he was too. We're not Nazi Germany." In another post, said to a commenter, "You are blind at the altar of St Jacinda [Ardern]."

In August 2021, almost a year after he had left Parliament, King posted an article on Facebook that described COVID-19 vaccines as dangerous and downplayed the risks of the virus. National Party leader Judith Collins distanced herself and the party from these claims. King said that he was not anti-vaccine and was simply trying to start a conversation.

In November 2021, King livestreamed on Facebook a discussion with University of Auckland epidemiologist Simon Thornley, where they discussed alternative (and widely debunked) treatments for COVID-19, as well as downplaying the severity of the disease. Collins distanced the National Party from these comments, saying that the party believed in the effectiveness of vaccines, while defending King as "a lovely guy".

In a February 2022 interview, King stated, "I do not believe for a second 90 per cent of people have been vaccinated. That's the big lie. We all know it's bullshit, this vaccination just is not supported by the science."

King has opposed vaccine mandates as "undemocratic" and against the Bill of Rights. As of February 2022, King heads a group that represents military and police who oppose vaccine mandates in those workforces. In February 2022, King attended the 2022 Wellington occupation of parliament.

In a May 2022 interview on Sean Plunket's online radio station The Platform, King said that he was double vaccinated but was "dead against being told to be vaccinated".

=== Climate change ===
King rejected the scientific consensus on climate change in a controversial August 2019 Facebook post, arguing that the phenomenon is simply "natural". He subsequently described himself as a "climate inquirer". At the time of the post, the Zero Carbon Bill – backed by both the Labour-led coalition in government and the National Party in opposition – was going through the Select Committee stage of the legislative process. The post borrowed heavily from the far-right US source "Americans for Limited Government", and sparked widespread criticism and ridicule across New Zealand politics.

=== Cannabis ===
When asked in 2019, Matt King said that he had smoked cannabis "a long time ago", but did not want to legalise it because doing so would condone smoking for young people. He said, "I like the approach of not legalising it as such, more decriminalisation", and suggested giving people fines for minor use.

New Zealand Parliament
Preceded by Winston Peters	Member of Parliament for Northland; 2017–2020	Succeeded by Willow-Jean Prime
