= 2015 Northland by-election =

New Zealand by-election

- 28 March 2015

Northland
- Turnout: 29,590 (64.39%)
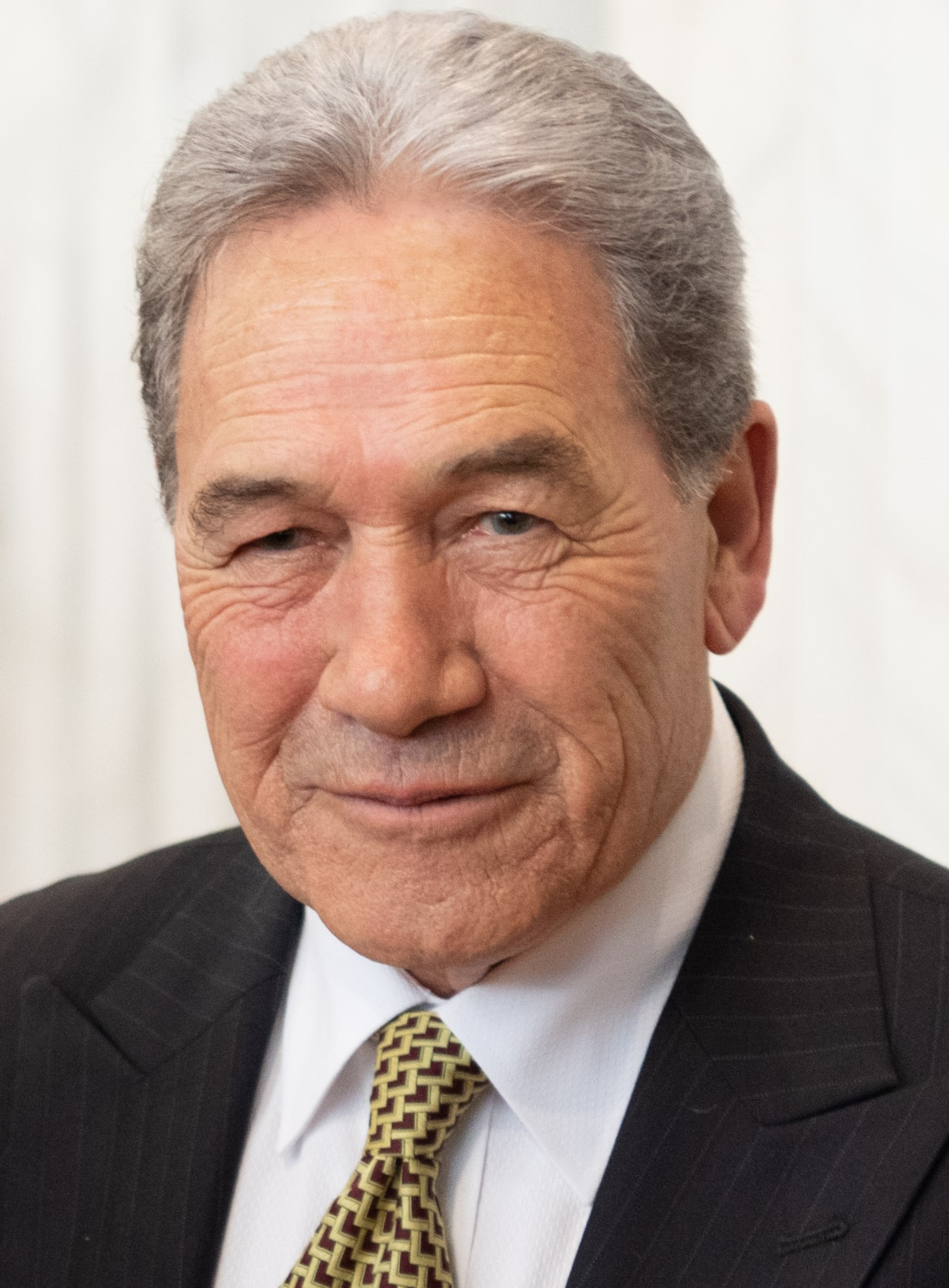

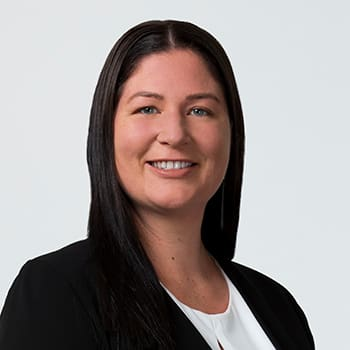
	First party	Second party	Third party
		NAT
Candidate	Winston Peters	Mark Osborne	Willow-Jean Prime
Party	NZ First	National	Labour
Popular vote	16,089	11,648	1,380
Percentage	54.5%	39.4%	4.7%
Swing	▲54.5pp	▼13.32pp	▼21.22pp
- Northland electorate boundaries used for the by-election
MP before election
Mike Sabin
National
Elected MP
Winston Peters
New Zealand First

A by-election was held in the Northland electorate on 28 March 2015. The seat had been vacated following the resignation of Mike Sabin of the National Party from the House of Representatives on 30 January 2015. Northland was generally regarded as a safe National seat; the party has held the seat since its creation for the 1996 election. The election was won by Winston Peters of New Zealand First. As Peters was already a list MP for his party, this allowed New Zealand First an additional list member, Ria Bond, to join parliament.

== Background ==
In December 2014 New Zealand media reported that Northland MP Mike Sabin was under investigation by police over an assault complaint. The reports were not confirmed by the New Zealand Police, the Prime Minister or Sabin himself.

Sabin resigned from parliament on 30 January 2015 with immediate effect "due to personal issues that were best dealt with outside Parliament."

=== Northland electorate ===
The boundaries of the Northland electorate are largely determined by the Northland coastline. The electorate extends from a line between Leigh on the east coast and the Kaipara Harbour on the west coast (including Wellsford) to Cape Reinga, but excludes Whangārei and environs. The major communities include Kaitaia, Russell, Kerikeri, Kaikohe, Dargaville and Mangawhai Heads.

The Northland electorate experienced low population growth between the censuses in 2006 and 2013 (1.2%). Among general electorates Northland had the second-largest proportion of those from the Māori ethnic group (37.1%), as well as those who could speak Māori (10.4%). It had the highest share of: those who worked from home on census day 2013 (18.1%); those affiliated with the Ratana (Māori Christian) faith (4.7%); those affiliated with the Brethren religion (1.3%). Among general electorates in 2013, Northland had the second-lowest median family income ($51,400), and the lowest proportion of wage and salary workers (31.5%).

== Candidates ==
Eleven candidates contested the by-election.

The National Party confirmed that it would contest the by-election, with Mark Osborne selected as candidate. National Party board member Grant McCallum also contested National's selection, along with Mita Harris, Matt King, and Karen Rolleston.

Willow-Jean Prime, a Far North District councillor who contested the Northland electorate for the Labour Party at the 2014 election, was again Labour's candidate.

New Zealand First leader Winston Peters contested the by-election. Labour leader Andrew Little opined that Peters, aged 69 at the time of the election, would be too old for many voters to select as their new electorate MP. This was rejected by 85% of respondents to a 3 News and Reid Research poll. The Prime Minister, John Key, stated that Peters had "zero chance" in the National Party stronghold, but softened his stance within days when the first opinion polls came out that had Peters at 35%, whilst Osborne sat at 30%.

Reuben Porter was the Mana Movement candidate.

Robin Grieve was the ACT candidate. Joe Carr contested the election for Focus New Zealand while Maki Herbert represented the Aotearoa Legalise Cannabis Party and Rob Painting the Climate Party.

Adam Holland, Adrian Bonner and Bruce Rogan were independent candidates. Holland had previously stood in the 2013 Christchurch East by-election, the 2013 Ikaroa-Rawhiti by-election and in Epsom at the 2014 general election.

== Opinion polling ==
Party	Candidate	TV3/Reid Research 2–4 March	One News/Colmar Brunton 3–6 March	TV3/Reid Research 19–22 March	One News/Colmar Brunton 22–25 March
NZ First	Winston Peters	35%	36%	54%	53%
National	Mark Osborne	30%	36%	34%	36%
Labour	Willow-Jean Prime	16%	20%	10%	9%
Other/Don't know		19%	8%	2%	2%
Sample size		500	500	500	501
Maximum margin of error		4.4%	4.4%	4.4%	4.4%

== Results ==
The following table shows final by-election results:

2015 Northland by-election
Notes: Blue background denotes the winner of the by-election. Pink background denotes a candidate elected from their party list prior to the by-election. Yellow background denotes the winner of the by-election, who was a list MP prior to the by-election. A ✓ or ✗ denotes status of any incumbent, win or lose respectively.
Party	Candidate	Votes	%	±%
NZ First	Winston Peters	16,089	54.45	+54.45
National	Mark Osborne	11,648	39.42	−13.32
Labour	Willow-Jean Prime	1,380	4.67	−21.22
Focus	Joe Carr	113	0.38	−4.41
Legalise Cannabis	Maki Herbert	94	0.32	+0.32
ACT	Robin Grieve	68	0.23	−0.35
Mana Party	Reuben Porter	60	0.20	+0.20
Climate	Rob Painting	39	0.13	+0.13
Independent	Bruce Rogan	24	0.08	+0.08
Independent	Adrian Bonner	17	0.06	+0.06
Independent	Adam Holland	16	0.05	+0.05
Informal votes		42	0.14	−1.05
Total Valid votes		29,548		
Turnout		29,590	64.39	−14.51
Registered electors		45,955		
NZ First gain from National	Majority	4,441	15.03	
