= Catherine Delahunty =

New Zealand politician

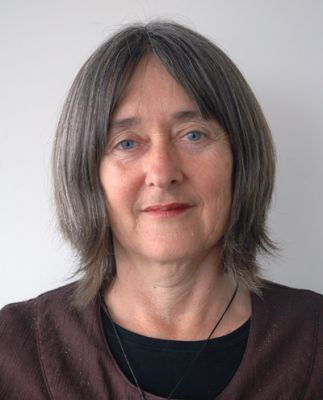

Member of the New Zealand Parliament for Green Party List
- In office 8 November 2008 – 23 September 2017

4th Female co-convenor of the Green Party
- In office 2003–2005 Serving with: David Clendon (2003–2004); Paul de Spa (2004–2005)
- Leader: Jeanette Fitzsimons and Rod Donald
- Preceded by: David Clendon
- Succeeded by: Paul de Spa and Karen Davies

Personal details
- Born: 1953 (age 72–73) Wellington, New Zealand
- Party: Green
- Website: Green Party profile

Catherine Delahunty (born 1953) is a New Zealand politician and environmentalist. From 2008 election until 2017 she was a member of parliament in the House of Representatives representing the Green Party.

During her time as an MP she served variously as the Green Party spokesperson on Education, Water, Toxics, Te Tiriti o Waitangi, Mining (Terrestrial), Forestry, Civil Defence, Disability Issues, Women's Affairs, Arts, Culture & Heritage, and the Community & Voluntary Sector.

== Political career ==
New Zealand Parliament
Years	Term	Electorate	List	Party
2008–2011	49th	List	8	Green
2011–2014	50th	List	4	Green
2014–2017	51st	List	6	Green

Delahunty was the female co-convenor of the Green Party from 2003 to 2005. She has been placed high on the Greens' list for several years, just missing getting into Parliament on several occasions.

=== Member of Parliament ===
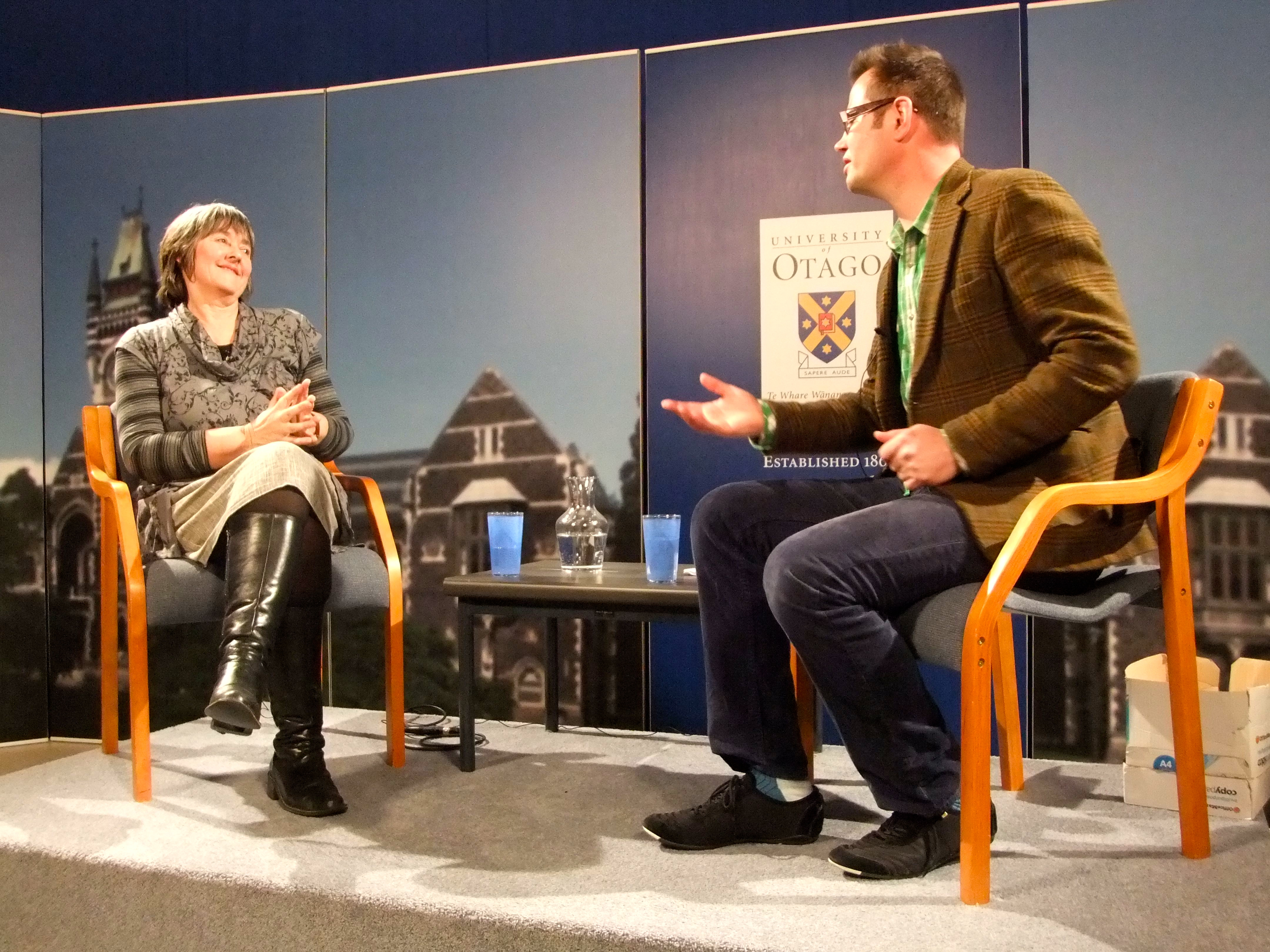
Delahunty interviewed as a part of the 'Vote Chat' forum at the University of Otago, 2011

Delahunty was placed at number eight on the Green Party list for the 2008 election. She was elected as a Green Party MP and gained the fourth highest number of candidate votes in the East Coast electorate. In 2011 Delahunty was ranked at number 4 on the final Greens list for the 2011 general election.

In June 2009, Delahunty's Customs and Excise (Sustainable Forestry) Amendment Bill, which would have prohibited the import of timber produced unsustainably or illegally, was drawn from the member's ballot. The bill was defeated at its first reading.

In the 2014 general election, Delahunty was ranked number 6 on the Green Party list, a demotion of two places relative to her 2011 ranking. Despite that, Delahunty easily got reelected to parliament.

On 15 December 2016, she announced alongside Steffan Browning that she will not be seeking re-election in the 2017 general election.

Party political offices
Preceded by David Clendon	Co-convenor of the Green Party with David Clendon and Paul de Spa; 2003–2005	Succeeded by Paul de Spa and Karen Davies

== Tiriti worker ==
Since the early 1990s Delahunty has been working to educate people about Te Tiriti o Waitangi. She credits this as leading her into politics and acknowledges Whaitiri (Betty) Williams as leading her to this work and Mitzi Nairn as a pioneer in this field.

== Personal ==
Delahunty's sister is playwright Sarah Delahunty.
