= Mike Sabin =

New Zealand politician

Member of the New Zealand Parliament for Northland
- In office 26 November 2011 – 30 January 2015
- Preceded by: John Carter
- Succeeded by: Winston Peters

Personal details
- Born: Michael Lewis Sabin; 24 September 1968 (age 58)
- Party: National Party

Michael Lewis Sabin (born 24 September 1968) is a former police officer, drug educator and New Zealand politician. He is a member of the National Party and was a member of the House of Representatives from 2011 to 2015. He played a key role in establishing the Alcohol and Other Drug Treatment Court (the AODTC) in New Zealand.

== Personal ==
Sabin was raised and schooled in Whangārei. He is the father of former 3 News political reporter Brook Sabin.

Sabin wrote a book called The Long Way Home after his other son Darryl received a brain injury playing rugby in 2009. The book is about Darryl's injury and the challenges the family overcame working towards his recovery. His son is now a motivational speaker.

== Career ==
Sabin was first employed as a Seaman Officer in the Royal New Zealand Navy in the 1980s. After leaving the navy, Sabin worked in the dairy industry before joining the Police in the 1990s. In 2006, he founded MethCon Group, a company that supplies drug education. He sold the company in October 2010. He also played a role in the establishment of the Alcohol and Other Drug Treatment Court (AODTC) in New Zealand by inviting American judge Peggy Hora to talk about how drug courts operate in the United States.

In 2008, Sabin received a Sir Peter Blake Emerging Leader Award.

== Member of Parliament ==
New Zealand Parliament
Years	Term	Electorate	List	Party
2011–2014	50th	Northland	60	National
2014–2015	51st	Northland	44	National

In May 2011 Sabin was selected as the National Party candidate for Northland to replace the retiring John Carter. He had a majority of 11,362 and 9,300 votes in 2011 and 2014, respectively.

=== Resignation ===
In December 2014 New Zealand media reported that Sabin was under investigation by police over an assault complaint. The reports were not confirmed by the New Zealand Police, Prime Minister John Key or Sabin himself. Sabin resigned from Parliament on 30 January 2015 with immediate effect "due to personal issues that were best dealt with outside Parliament." Key subsequently revealed that he had considered appointing Sabin as a minister when the National Party was re-elected in 2014.

Sabin's resignation forced a by-election in the Northland electorate.

== Post Parliament ==
In April 2015 Sabin started working at Peppers Carrington Resort in Karikari, recently bought by Chinese firm Shanghai CRED with plans to greatly expand it.

New Zealand Parliament
Preceded by John Carter	Member of Parliament for Northland; 2011–2015	Succeeded by Winston Peters
