= Willow-Jean Prime =

New Zealand politician

The Honourable Willow-Jean Prime MP
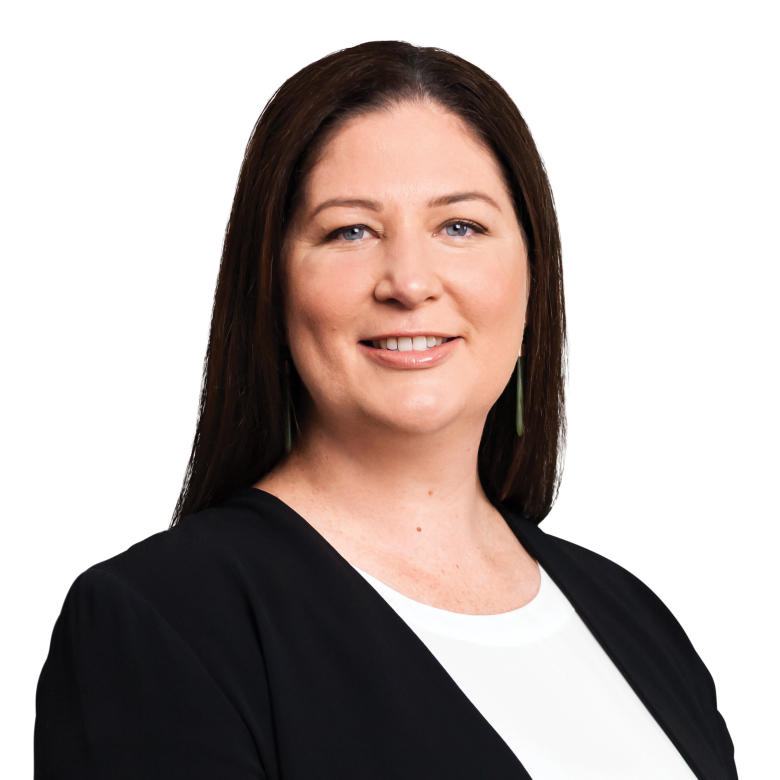
- Prime in 2023

16th Minister of Conservation
- In office 1 February 2023 – 27 November 2023
- Prime Minister: Chris Hipkins
- Preceded by: Poto Williams
- Succeeded by: Tama Potaka

16th Minister for Youth
- In office 1 February 2023 – 27 November 2023
- Prime Minister: Chris Hipkins
- Preceded by: Priyanca Radhakrishnan
- Succeeded by: Matt Doocey

Member of the New Zealand Parliament for Labour party list
- Incumbent
- Assumed office 14 October 2023
- In office 23 September 2017 – 17 October 2020

Member of the New Zealand Parliament for Northland
- In office 17 October 2020 – 14 October 2023
- Preceded by: Matt King
- Succeeded by: Grant McCallum
- Majority: 163

Personal details
- Born: Willow-Jean Downs; 1983 (age 42–43)
- Party: Labour
- Spouse: Dion
- Children: 2
- Education: University of Waikato

Willow-Jean Prime (née Downs; born 1983) is a New Zealand politician. She was first elected a Member of the New Zealand House of Representatives at the 2017 general election as a list representative of the New Zealand Labour Party. She was elected as the Member of Parliament for Northland at the 2020 general election and was re-elected as a list MP in 2023.

Prime was Minister of Conservation and Minister for Youth in the final year of the Sixth Labour Government. Her promotion marked the first time Cabinet had achieved a 10/10 gender split.

== Early life and education ==
Prime is of Te Kapotai, Ngāti Hine and Ngāpuhi descent and grew up in Northland. She attended Bay of Islands College in Kawakawa. Her father Barry (d. 2018) was a train driver; she learnt to drive a train before a car and wanted to follow her father's career but was advised at school that women could not drive trains. Prime played basketball at school and was offered a scholarship to play in the United States.

Prime is a graduate of Waikato University holding a Bachelor of Arts, Bachelor of Laws, post-graduate Diploma of Māori and Pacific Development with distinction, and Master of Laws focusing on recent developments in Treaty settlements, Māori governance and indigenous development. In 2014, she had started a Doctor of Philosophy in law at Waikato University.

She worked as a solicitor in Wellington before returning to Northland.

She lives near Pakaraka with her husband Dion, who is a teacher, and has two children. She was pregnant during both her 2015 and 2017 election campaigns.

== Political career ==
New Zealand Parliament
Years	Term	Electorate	List	Party
2017–2020	52nd	List	17	Labour
2020–2023	53rd	Northland	36	Labour
2023–2026	54th	List	9	Labour
2026–present	55th	List	7	Labour

=== Local government ===
Prime began her political career when she was elected to the Far North District Council for Bay of Islands-Whangaroa in 2013; she was the youngest person on the council at age 30. She was re-elected for a second term in 2016 and resigned from the council after she was elected to Parliament in 2017.

=== Unsuccessful campaigns for Parliament ===
Prime first ran for parliament in 2014. She ran for the Northland electorate, placing second with 29% of the vote. She was placed 34th on Labour's party list for the election, which due to a poor result by Labour was not enough for her to enter Parliament.

She ran again for the Northland electorate in its by-election of 2015. The seat was strategically relevant as New Zealand First leader Winston Peters threatened to unseat the safe National position. Polls showed a close race between Peters and the National candidate, Mark Osborne, with Prime third on around 16 to 20% of the vote, but also that Peters would win if Prime withdrew from the race. Labour Party leader Andrew Little did not oppose strategic voting, saying, "We have a candidate in the race, and she's a good candidate, and she's somebody who we want in Parliament. I have a duty to back her. But in the end, I want Northlanders to exercise their choice, to see that they could make a difference here. If they want to send a message to the government that we are sick and tired of being neglected, then they know what their choice is." Ultimately, Peters won the by-election and Prime came third with 4.7% of the vote.

=== First term, 2017–2020 ===
Prime ran again in Northland at the 2017 general election. Labour placed her 16th on its party list, later moving her to 17th following a reshuffle. This high ranking almost guaranteed her entry to Parliament. On the initial list, Prime had the highest Labour rank for a Māori candidate, though after the reshuffle deputy leader Kelvin Davis was placed above her. Prime said she would resign her seat in the Far North District Council should she be elected to Parliament. Prime again did not win the Northland electorate, but entered parliament via the party list. She delivered her maiden statement on 9 November 2017 in which she shared her concerns about child poverty and youth suicide in Northland. Prime sat on the Finance and Expenditure Committee from 2017 to 2019 and the Governance and Administration Committee from 2019 to 2020. She was one of several Members of Parliament who had babies shortly before or during this term and spoke on the third reading of the Parental Leave and Employment Protection Amendment Bill in November 2017 while holding her second child.

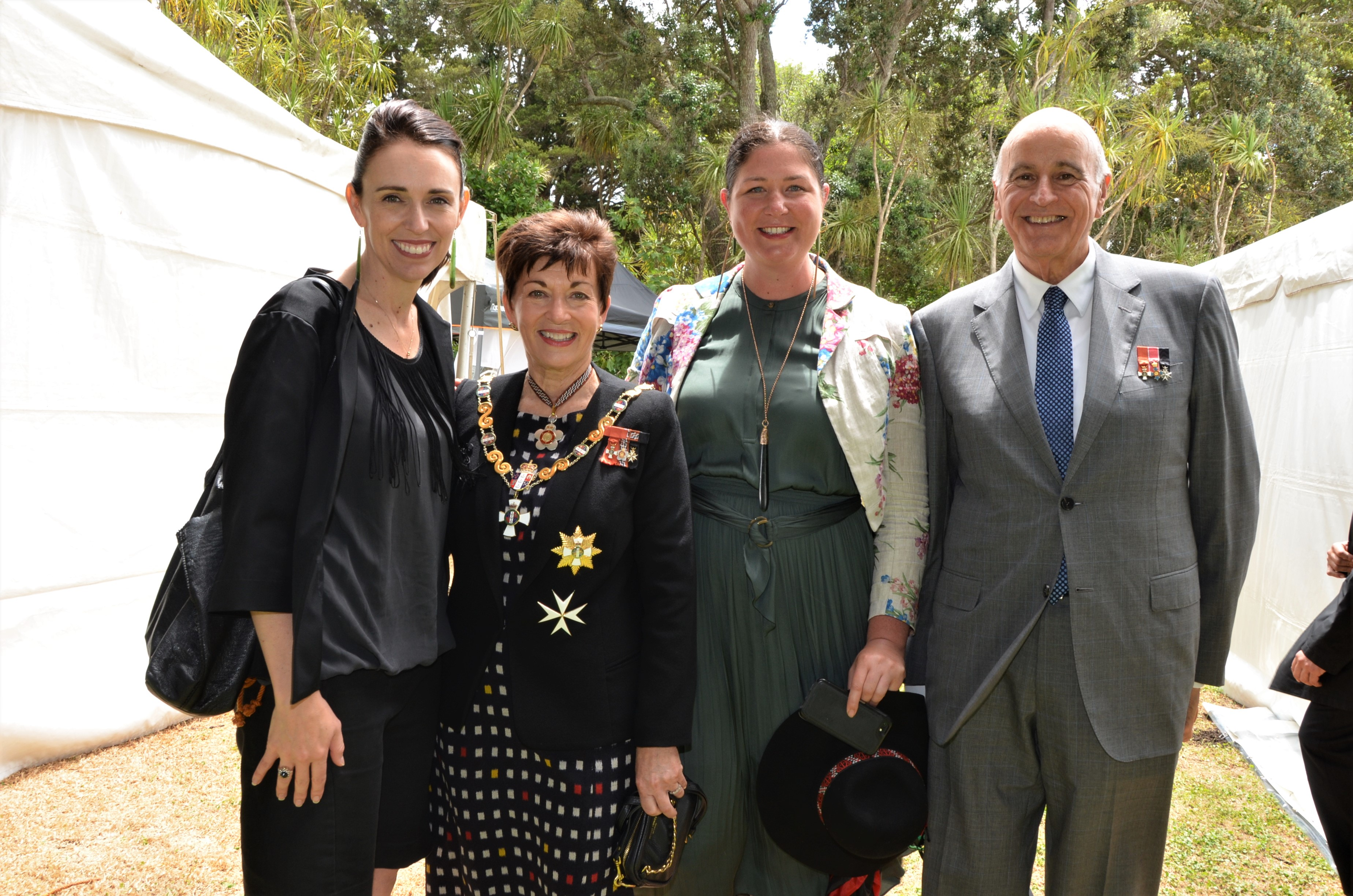
Prime with Prime Minister Jacinda Ardern, Governor-General Dame Patsy Reddy, and Reddy's husband.

Following a cabinet reshuffle on 27 June 2019, Prime was appointed as the Parliamentary Private Secretary for Local Government.

=== Second term, 2020–2023 ===
Prime ran again in the 2020 general election, still contesting Northland but this time moved down to 36th on the Labour party list. Northland was again an important electorate; New Zealand First was polling poorly, but if its candidate Shane Jones could win Northland it would stay in Parliament. Unlike the 2015 by-election, Prime and Labour offered no support to New Zealand First in Northland. Prime would not tell Northlanders to vote for Jones, saying "The prime minister has been clear that we haven't made those sorts of deals before and we won't now." While preliminary results indicated she had again lost the Northland electorate to the National candidate Matt King, the final count released on 6 November gave her a victory with a majority of 163 votes. King initially said that he would request a recount, but the next day changed his mind as he had concluded that there was little chance of overturning the result.

Following the 2020 election, Prime was appointed as Labour's assistant whip on 2 November. She sat on the Justice Committee from 2020 to 2023 and was briefly a member of the Māori Affairs Committee in 2022. She also sat on the Pae Ora Legislation Committee.

In a reshuffle by Prime Minister Chris Hipkins on 31 January 2023 Prime was appointed Minister of Conservation, Minister for Youth, Associate Minister for Arts, Culture and Heritage, and Associate Minister of Health.

In April 2023, she was promoted into Cabinet by Prime Minister Hipkins and, in May 2023, she succeeded Meka Whaitiri as Associate Minister of Statistics after Whaitiri's removal from the Government. In her capacity as Conservation Minister, Prime announced protection measures for the Hauraki Gulf, reform of the seventy-year-old Wildlife Act and, along with Oceans and Fisheries Minister Rachel Brooking, that the Government would create six new marine reserves between Timaru and the Catlins in the lower South Island.

=== Third term, 2023–2026 ===
Prime was placed 9th on the Labour Party list for the 2023 general election. It was reported her high placement reflected the late decision of Kiritapu Allan not to seek re-election. At the election, Prime was unseated in Northland by National Party candidate Grant McCallum who won a 6,000 vote majority; however, Prime was re-elected on the Labour Party list.

On 30 November, Prime assumed the children, youth, and associate education (Māori) portfolios in the Shadow Cabinet of Chris Hipkins. On 5 December 2023, Prime was granted retention of the title The Honourable, in recognition of her term as a member of the Executive Council. On 6 December she was appointed a member of the Social Services and Community committee.

On 7 March 2025, Prime gained the education portfolio but lost the youth and association education (Māori) portfolios during a cabinet reshuffle. In early August 2025, The New Zealand Herald reported that Prime had declined multiple opportunities by Education Minister Erica Stanford to be briefed on the Government's proposed changes to the National Certificate of Educational Achievement (NCEA) high school certificate. After Stanford reached out to Hipkins, Prime declined the invitation on the grounds that she wanted to speak with parents and teachers first.

On 11 March 2026, Prime lost the education portfolio to Ginny Anderson in Labour's first reshuffle of the year. She did however gain the social development portfolio.

=== Fourth term, 2026–present ===
During the 2026 New Zealand general election, Prime contested the Te Tai Tokerau electorate for Labour. She was ranked seventh place on the Labour party list. On 7 November, Prime came third place in the Te Tai Tokerau contest, gaining 6,209 votes based on preliminary results. Due to her high ranking on the Labour Party list, she was re-elected to Parliament as a list MP.

New Zealand Parliament
Preceded by Matt King	Member of Parliament for Northland; 2020–2023	Succeeded by Grant McCallum
Political offices
Preceded by Poto Williams	Minister of Conservation; 2023	Succeeded by Tama Potaka
Preceded by Priyanca Radhakrishnan	Minister for Youth; 2023	Succeeded by Matt Doocey
