= Caucuses and MPs' responsibilities in the 48th New Zealand Parliament =

Event that determined the composition of the 48th New Zealand Parliament

The 2005 New Zealand general election took place on 17 September 2005 and determined the composition of the 48th New Zealand Parliament. The table below lists all the political parties and the members of parliaments in the New Zealand Parliament, 48th New Zealand Parliament. The political parties are listed alphabetically and the members of parliaments in each party are ranked according to their caucus ranking.

== Act Party's parliamentary caucus ==
	Name	Electorate/List	Salary (as of 1 July 2005)	Caucus Responsibilities
1	Rodney Hide	MP for Epsom	131,620	Parliamentary leader of the ACT Party; Spokesman for Environment; Spokesman for Finance; Spokesman for Office of Prime Minister and the Cabinet; Member, Finance and Expenditure Select Committee; Member, Privileges Select Committee; Member, Standing Orders Select Committee; Member, Justice & Electoral Member for an item of business Select Committee
2	Heather Roy	List MP	118,000	Deputy-Parliamentary leader of the ACT Party; Party Whip; Spokeswoman for Education; Spokeswoman for Family; Spokeswoman for Health; Spokeswoman for National Security; Member, Business Select Committee; Member, Social Services Select Committee

== Green Party's parliamentary caucus ==
	Name	Electorate/List	Salary (as of 1 July 2005)	Caucus Responsibilities
1	Jeanette Fitzsimons	List MP	138,100	Parliamentary leader of the Greens Party; Government Spokeswoman for Energy Efficiency and Conservation; Spokeswoman for Climate Change; Spokeswoman for Economics; Spokeswoman for Energy; Spokeswoman for Genetic Engineering; Spokeswoman for Research, Science and Technology (including Crown Research Institutes); Spokeswoman for Sustainable Economics; Spokeswoman for Transport; Associate Spokeswoman for Treaty of Waitangi Issues; Member, Finance and Expenditure Select Committee; Member, Officers of Parliament Select Committee
2	Sue Bradford	List MP	118,000	Government Spokeswoman for Buy Kiwi Made; Spokeswoman for ACC; Spokeswoman for Agriculture; Spokeswoman for Children's Affairs; Spokeswoman for Community and Volunteer Sector; Spokeswoman for Community Economic Development and Small Business; Spokeswoman for Disability Issues; Spokeswoman for Employment; Spokeswoman for Gambling; Spokeswoman for Housing; Spokeswoman for Industrial Relations; Spokeswoman for Internal Affairs; Spokeswoman for Mental Health; Spokeswoman for National Library and Archives; Spokeswoman for Racing; Spokeswoman for Regional Development; Spokeswoman for Rural AffairsComm; Spokeswoman for Social Development; Spokeswoman for Social Services; Associate Spokeswoman for Arts and Culture; Member, Social Services Select Committee
3	Sue Kedgley	List MP	130,000	Spokeswoman for Animal Welfare; Spokeswoman for Arts and Culture; Spokeswoman for Broadcasting; Spokeswoman for Civil Aviation; Spokeswoman for Communications; Spokeswoman for Consumer Affairs; Spokeswoman for Food Safety; Spokeswoman for Health; Co-Spokeswoman for Local Government; Spokeswoman for Organics; Spokeswoman for Women's Affairs; Associate Spokeswoman for ACC; Associate Spokeswoman for Environment; Associate Spokeswoman for Transport (Wellington); Chairperson, Health Select Committee
4	Keith Locke	List MP	118,000	Spokesman for Civil Defence; Spokesman for Customs; Spokesman for Defence; Spokesman for Disarmament and Arms Control; Spokesman for Ethnic Affairs; Spokesman for Foreign Affairs; Spokesman for Human Rights; Spokesman for Immigration; Spokesman for Overseas Development Assistance (ODA); Spokesman for Pacific Island Affairs; Spokesman for Police; Spokesman for Security and Intelligence; Spokesman for Sports, Fitness and Leisure; Spokesman for Trade; Spokesman for Veteran Affairs; Associate Spokesman for Industrial Relations; Associate Spokesman for Transport (Auckland); Member, Foreign Affairs, Trade and Defence Select Committee
5	Metiria Turei	List MP	130,000	Party Musterer (Whip); Spokeswoman for Biosecurity; Spokeswoman for Conservation; Spokeswoman for Education (including Tertiary Education); Spokeswoman for Environmental Education; Co-Spokeswoman for Fisheries; Spokeswoman for Justice; Co-Spokeswoman for Local Government; Spokeswoman for Maori Affairs; Spokeswoman for Superannuation; Spokeswoman for Tourism; Spokeswoman for Treaty of Waitangi Issues; Spokeswoman for Youth Affairs; Associate Spokeswoman for Heath (Alcohol and Drugs); Member, Business Select Committee; Member, Local Government and Environment Select Committee; Member, Privileges Select Committee
6	Nándor Tánczos	List MP	118,000	Spokesman for Commerce; Spokesman for Constitutional Issues; Spokesman for Electoral Reform; Spokesman for Environment; Spokesman for Forestry; Spokesman for Information Technology and Communications; Spokesman for Justice; Spokesman for Land Information; Spokesman for Statistics; Spokesman for Waste and Sustainable Land Management; Member, Justice and Electoral Select Committee; Member, Standing Orders Select Committee

== Jim Anderton's Progressive Party's parliamentary caucus ==
	Name	Electorate/List	Salary (as of 1 July 2005)	Caucus Responsibilities
1	Jim Anderton	MP for Wigram	216,000	Parliamentary leader of the Jim Anderton's Progressive Party; Minister of Agriculture; Minister for Biosecurity; Minister of Fisheries; Minister of Forestry; Minister Responsible for the Public Trust; Associate Minister of Health; Associate Minister for Tertiary Education; Member, Cabinet Appointments and Honours Committee; Member, Cabinet Committee on Domestic and External Security Co-ordination; Member, Cabinet Committee on Government Expenditure and Administration; Member, Cabinet Economic Development Committee; Member, Cabinet External Relations and Defence Committee; Member, Cabinet Legislation Committee; Member, Cabinet Policy Committee; Member, Cabinet Social Development Committee

== Labour Party's parliamentary caucus ==
	Name	Electorate/List	Salary (as of 1 July 2005)	Caucus Responsibilities
1	Helen Clark	MP for Mt.Albert	347,000	Parliamentary leader of the Labour Party; Prime Minister; Minister for Arts, Culture and Heritage; Minister in charge of the NZ Security Intelligence Service; Minister Responsible for Ministerial Services; Minister Responsible for the Government Communications Security Bureau (GCSB); Chairperson, Cabinet Appointments and Honours Committee; Chairperson, Cabinet Committee on Domestic and External Security Co-ordination; Chairperson, Cabinet Economic Development Committee; Chairperson, Cabinet Policy Committee; Member, Cabinet Committee on Government Expenditure and Administration; Member, Cabinet External Relations and Defence Committee; Member, Cabinet Legislation Committee; Member, Cabinet Social Development Committee
2	Michael Cullen	List MP	245,000	Deputy-Parliamentary leader of the Labour Party; Deputy Prime Minister; Leader of the House; Minister of Finance; Minister for Tertiary Education; Attorney General (Includes responsibility for Serious Fraud Office); Chairperson, Cabinet Legislation Committee; Member, Cabinet Appointments and Honours Committee; Member, Cabinet Committee on Domestic and External Security Co-ordination; Member, Cabinet Committee on Government Expenditure and Administration; Member, Cabinet Economic Development Committee; Member, Cabinet External Relations and Defence Committee; Member, Cabinet Policy Committee; Member, Cabinet Social Development Committee; Deputy-Chairperson, Privileges Select Committee; Deputy-Chairperson, Standing Orders Select Committee
3	Steve Maharey	MP for Palmerston North	216,000	Minister of Broadcasting; Minister for Crown Research Institutes; Minister of Education; Minister of Research, Science and Technology; Minister Responsible for the Education Review Office; Chairperson, Cabinet Social Development Committee; Member, Cabinet Appointments and Honours Committee; Member, Cabinet Economic Development Committee; Member, Cabinet Policy Committee
4	Phil Goff	MP for Mt.Roskill	216,000	Minister of Defence; Minister for Disarmament and Arms Control; Minister of Pacific Island Affairs; Minister of Trade; Minister for Trade Negotiations; Associate Minister of Finance; Chairperson, Cabinet External Relations and Defence Committee; Member, Cabinet Appointments and Honours Committee; Member, Cabinet Committee on Domestic and External Security Co-ordination; Member, Cabinet Committee on Government Expenditure and Administration; Member, Cabinet Economic Development Committee; Member, Cabinet Policy Committee
5	Annette King	MP for Rongotai	216,000	Minister for Food Safety; Minister of Police; Minister of State Services; Minister of Transport; Member, Cabinet Appointments and Honours Committee; Member, Cabinet Committee on Domestic and External Security Co-ordination; Member, Cabinet Committee on Government Expenditure and Administration; Member, Cabinet Economic Development Committee; Member, Cabinet External Relations and Defence Committee; Member, Cabinet Policy Committee; Member, Cabinet Social Development Committee
6	Trevor Mallard	MP for Hutt South	216,000	Minister for Economic Development; Minister for Industry and Regional Development; Minister for the Rugby World Cup; Minister for State Owned Enterprises; Minister for Sport and Recreation; Associate Minister of Finance; Chairperson, Cabinet Committee on Government Expenditure and Administration; Member, Cabinet Appointments and Honours Committee; Member, Cabinet Economic Development Committee; Member, Cabinet External Relations and Defence Committee; Member, Cabinet Legislation Committee; Member, Cabinet Policy Committee
7	Pete Hodgson	MP for Dunedin North	216,000	Minister of Health; Member, Cabinet Appointments and Honours Committee; Member, Cabinet Committee on Domestic and External Security Co-ordination; Member, Cabinet Policy Committee; Member, Cabinet Social Development Committee
8	Parekura Horomia	MP for Ikaroa-Rawhiti	216,000	Minister of Maori Affairs; Associate Minister of Education; Associate Minister of Fisheries; Associate Minister of Social Development and Employment (Employment); Associate Minister of State Services; Associate Minister of Youth Affairs; Member, Cabinet Appointments and Honours Committee; Member, Cabinet Committee on Government Expenditure and Administration; Member, Cabinet Economic Development Committee; Member, Cabinet Policy Committee; Member, Cabinet Social Development Committee
9	Mark Burton	MP for Taupo	216,000	Deputy Leader of the House; Minister of Justice; Minister of Local Government; Minister in Charge of Treaty of Waitangi Negotiations; Minister Responsible for the Law Commission; Deputy-Chairperson, Cabinet Legislation Committee; Member, Cabinet Appointments and Honours Committee; Member, Cabinet Policy Committee; Member, Cabinet Social Development Committee
10	Ruth Dyson	MP for Banks Peninsula	216,000	Minister for ACC; Minister for Disability Issues; Minister of Labour; Minister for Senior Citizens; Associate Minister of Social Development & Employment (including Child, Youth and Family); Member, Cabinet Committee on Government Expenditure and Administration; Member, Cabinet Economic Development Committee; Member, Cabinet Social Development Committee
11	Chris Carter	MP for Te Atatu	216,000	Minister of Conservation; Minister for Ethnic Affairs; Minister of Housing; Member, Cabinet Appointments and Honours Committee; Member, Cabinet Social Development Committee
12	Rick Barker	List MP	216,000	Minister of Civil Defence; Minister for Courts; Minister of Internal Affairs; Minister of Veterans' Affairs; Member, Cabinet Social Development Committee
13	Lianne Dalziel	MP for Christchurch East	216,000	Minister of Commerce; Minister for Small Business; Minister of Women's Affairs; Member, Cabinet Appointments and Honours Committee; Member, Cabinet Economic Development Committee; Member, Cabinet Legislation Committee; Member, Cabinet Social Development Committee
14	Damien O'Connor	MP for West Coast-Tasman	216,000	Minister of Corrections; Minister for Rural Affairs; Minister of Tourism; Associate Minister of Health; Member, Cabinet Economic Development Committee; Member, Cabinet Social Development Committee
15	David Cunliffe	MP for New Lynn	216,000	Minister of Communications; Minister of Immigration; Minister for Information Technology; Associate Minister of Economic Development; Member, Cabinet Committee on Government Expenditure and Administration; Member, Cabinet Economic Development Committee; Member, Cabinet External Relations and Defence Committee
16	David Parker	List MP	216,000	Minister of Energy; Minister for Land Information; Minister Responsible for Climate Change issues; Member, Cabinet Economic Development Committee
17	Nanaia Mahuta	MP for Tainui	216,000	Minister of Customs; Minister of Youth Affairs; Associate Minister for Environment; Associate Minister of Local Government; Member, Cabinet Economic Development Committee; Member, Cabinet Social Development Committee
18	Clayton Cosgrove	MP for Waimakariri	216,000	Minister for Building Issues; Minister of Statistics; Associate Minister of Finance; Associate Minister of Immigration; Associate Minister of Justice; Member, Cabinet Committee on Government Expenditure and Administration; Member, Cabinet Economic Development Committee
19	Judith Tizard	MP for Auckland Central	183,000	Minister for Auckland Issues; Minister of Consumer Affairs; Minister Responsible for Archives NZ and the National Library; Associate Minister for Arts, Culture and Heritage; Associate Minister of Commerce; Associate Minister of Transport; Member, Cabinet Economic Development Committee; Member, Transport and Industrial Relations Select Committee
20	Dover Samuels	List MP	183,000	Minister of State; Associate Minister for Economic Development; Associate Minister of Housing; Associate Minister for Industry and Regional Development; Associate Minister of Tourism; Member, Cabinet Economic Development Committee; Member, Government Administration Select Committee; Member, Primary Production Select Committee
21	Harry Duynhoven	MP for New Plymouth	183,000	Minister for Transport Safety; Associate Minister of Energy; Member, Cabinet Economic Development Committee; Member, Health Select Committee
22	Mita Ririnui	List MP	183,000	Minister of State; Associate Minister of Corrections; Associate Minister of Forestry; Associate Minister of Health; Associate Minister in Charge of Treaty of Waitangi Negotiations; Member, Cabinet Social Development Committee; Member, Mäori Affairs Select Committee
23	Winnie Laban	MP for Mana	183,000	Minister for the Community and Voluntary Sector; Associate Minister for Economic Development; Associate Minister of Pacific Island Affairs; Associate Minister for Social Development and Employment; Member, Cabinet Social Development Committee; Member, Commerce Select Committee; Member, Law and Order Select Committee
24	Mahara Okeroa	MP for Te Tai Tonga	183,000	Minister of State; Associate Minister for Arts, Culture and Heritage; Associate Minister of Conservation; Associate Minister for Social Development and Employment; Member, Cabinet Social Development Committee; Member, Mäori Affairs Select Committee
	Margaret Wilson	List MP	216,000	Speaker of the House of Representatives; Chairperson, Parliamentary Service Commission; Chairperson, Business Select Committee; Chairperson, Officers of Parliament Select Committee; Chairperson, Standing Orders Select Committee
	Tim Barnett	MP for Christchurch Central	162,525	Senior Government Whip; Member, Cabinet Legislation Committee; Member, Business Select Committee; Member, Standing Orders Select Committee
	Darren Hughes	MP for Otaki	130,000	Junior Government Whip; Member, Officers of Parliament Select Committee
	David Benson-Pope	MP for Dunedin South	130,000	
	Steve Chadwick	MP for Rotorua	130,000	Chairperson, Local Government and Environment Select Committee; Member, Social Services Select Committee
	Charles Chauvel	List MP	118,000	Member, Commerce Select Committee; Member, Government Administration Select Committee; Member, Regulations Review Select Committee
	Ashraf Choudhary	List MP	122,000	Deputy-Chairperson, Primary Production Select Committee; Member, Education and Science Select Committee
	Russell Fairbrother	List MP	130,000	Chairperson, Social Services Select Committee; Member, Local Government and Environment Committee; Member, Privileges Select Committee
	Darien Fenton	List MP	122,000	Deputy-Chairperson, Government Administration Select Committee; Member, Transport and Industrial Relations Select Committee
	Martin Gallagher	MP for Hamilton West	130,000	Chairperson, Law and Order Select Committee; Member, Local Government and Environment Select Committee
	Mark Gosche	MP for Maungakiekie	130,000	Chairperson, Transport and Industrial Relations Select Committee; Member, Finance and Expenditure Select Committee
	Ann Hartley	List MP	130,000	Assistant Speaker of the House of Representative; Member, Health Select Committee; Member, Justice and Electoral Select Committee
	George Hawkins	MP for Manurewa	118,000	Member, Finance and Expenditure Select Committee
	Dave Hereora	List MP	130,000	Chairperson, Mäori Affairs Select Committee; Member, Primary Production Select Committee
	Marian Hobbs	MP for Wellington Central	122,000	Deputy-Chairperson, Regulations Review Select Committee; Member, Education and Science Select Committee; Member, Local Government and Environment Select Committee
	Shane Jones	List MP	130,000	Chairperson, Finance and Expenditure Select Committee; Member, Commerce Select Committee
	Moana Mackey	List MP	122,000	Deputy-Chairperson, Education and Science Select Committee; Member, Primary Production Select Committee
	Sue Moroney	List MP	118,000	Member, Health Select Committee; Member, Transport and Industrial Relations Select Committee
	Jill Pettis	List MP	118,000	Member, Foreign Affairs, Defence and Trade Select Committee; Member, Law and Order Select Committee
	Lynne Pillay	MP for Waitakere	130,000	Chairperson, Justice and Electoral Select Committee
	Ross Robertson	List MP	130,000	Assistant Speaker of the House of Representative; Member, Foreign Affairs, Defence and Trade Select Committee; Member, Officers of Parliament Select Committee
	Lesley Soper	List MP	118,000	Member, Health Committee; Member, Transport and Industrial Relations Committee
	Maryan Street	List MP	122,000	Deputy-Chairperson, Health Select Committee; Member, Commerce Select Committee; Member, Regulations Review Select Committee
	Paul Swain	MP for Rimutaka	118,000	Member, Finance and Expenditure Select Committee; Member, Foreign Affairs, Defence and Trade Select Committee; Member, Privileges Select Committee
	Dianne Yates	List MP	130,000	Chairperson, Foreign Affairs, Defence and Trade Select Committee; Member, Education and Science Select Committee

== Maori Party's parliamentary caucus ==
	Name	Electorate/List	Salary (as of 1 July 2005)	Caucus Responsibilities
1	Tariana Turia	MP for Te tai Hauauru	134,860	Co-Parliamentary leader of the Māori Party; Member, Health Select Committee
2	Pita Sharples CBE	MP for Tamaki Makarau	134,860	Co-Parliamentary leader of the Māori Party; Deputy-Chairperson, Maori Affairs Select Committee; Member, Regulations Review Select Committee
3	Hone Harawira	MP for Te tai Tokerau	118,000	Member, Finance and Expenditure Select Committee; Member, Privileges Select Committee
4	Te Ururoa Flavell	MP for Waiariki	118,000	Party Whip; Member, Business Select Committee; Member, Education and Science Select Committee; Member, Standing Orders Select Committee

== National Party's parliamentary caucus ==
	Name	Electorate/List	Salary (as of 1 July 2005)	Caucus Responsibilities
1	John Key	MP for Helensville	216,000	Parliamentary leader of the National Party; Leader of the Opposition; Spokesman for the Security and Intelligence Service; Member, Finance and Expenditure Select Committee
2	Bill English	MP for Clutha-Southland	158,000	Deputy-Parliamentary leader of the National Party; Spokesman for Finance; Member, Education and Science Select Committee
3	Gerry Brownlee	MP for Ilam	118,000	Shadow Leader of the House; Spokesman for Energy; Spokesman for State Owned Enterprises; Spokesman for State Services; Chair of Strategy Committee; Member, Maori Affairs Select Committee; Member, Privileges Select Committee; Member, Standing Orders Select Committee
4	Simon Power	MP for Rangitikei	130,000	Spokesman for Commerce; Spokesman for Corrections; Spokesman for Justice; Chairperson, Privileges Select Committee; Member, Law and Order Select Committee
5	Nick Smith	MP for Nelson	118,000	Spokesman for Building and Construction; Spokesman for Climate Change; Spokesman for Conservation; Spokesman for Environment/Resource Management Act (RMA); Caucus Representative – National Party Board; Member, Local Government and Environment Select Committee
6	Tony Ryall	MP for Bay of Plenty	118,000	Spokesman for Health; Member, Health Select Committee
7	Judith Collins	MP for Clevedon	122,000	Spokeswoman for Family Affairs; Spokeswoman for Veterans Affairs; Spokeswoman for Welfare; Liaison with Pacific Island New Zealanders; Deputy-Chairperson, Social Services Select Committee
8	Katherine Rich	List MP	130,000	Spokeswoman for Education; Liaison with Youth; Chairperson, Commerce Select Committee
9	Maurice Williamson	MP for Pakuranga	122,000	Spokesman for Communications and Information Technology; Spokesman for Transport; Deputy-Chairperson, Transport and Industrial Relations Select Committee
10	David Carter	List MP	130,000	Spokesman for Agriculture; Chairperson, Primary Production Select Committee
11	Murray McCully	MP for East Coast Bays	118,000	Spokesman for Foreign Affairs and Trade; Spokesman for Sports and Recreation; Associate Spokesman for Defence; Member, Foreign Affairs, Trade and Defence Select Committee
12	Lockwood Smith	MP for Rodney	122,000	Spokesman for Immigration; Spokesman for Revenue; Associate Spokesman for Finance; Liaison with Ex-pats; Deputy-Chairperson, Finance and Expenditure Select Committee
13	Wayne Mapp	MP for North Shore	118,000	Spokesman for Auckland Issues; Spokesman for Defence; Associate Spokesman for Labour and Industrial Relations; Chair of Caucus Policy Committee; Member, Privileges Select Committee; Member, Transport and Industrial Relations Select Committee
14	Chris Finlayson	List MP	122,000	Shadow Attorney General; Spokesman for Arts, Culture and Heritage; Spokesman for Treaty of Waitangi Issues (Treaty Negotiations); Deputy-Chairperson, Justice and Electoral Select Committee
15	Tim Groser	List MP	118,000	Spokesman for Trade; Associate Spokesman for Finance; Member, Foreign Affairs, Trade and Defence Select Committee
16	Hon. Anne Tolley	MP for East Coast	130,000	Chief Whip; Associate Spokeswoman for Welfare (CYFS); Member, Officers of Parliament Select Committee; Member, Social Services Select Committee
17	Lindsay Tisch	MP for Piako	158,000	Spokesman for Racing; Spokesman for Small Business; Spokesman for Tourism; Member, Business Select Committee; Member, Officers of Parliament Select Committee; Member, Privileges Select Committee; Member, Standing Orders Select Committee
18	Pansy Wong	List MP	118,000	Spokeswoman for ACC; Spokeswoman for Ethnic Affairs; Associate Spokeswoman for Education (International Education); Associate Spokeswoman for Immigration; Liaison with Asian New Zealanders; Member, Commerce Select Committee
19	John Carter	MP for Northland	122,000	Spokesman for Civil Defence and Emergency Services; Spokesman for Local Government; Deputy-Chairperson, Local Government and Environment Select Committee
20	Phil Heatley	MP for Whangarei	118,000	Spokesman for Fisheries; Spokesman for Housing; Associate Spokesman for Energy; Member, Primary Production Select Committee
21	Georgina te Heuheu	List MP	122,000	Spokeswoman for Maori Affairs (Culture and Development); Associate Spokeswoman for Defence; Deputy-Chairperson, Foreign Affairs, Trade and Defence Select Committee; Member, Maori Affairs Select Committee
22	Paul Hutchison	MP for Port Waikato	118,000	Spokesman for Disability Issues; Spokesman for Policy on Children; Spokesman for Research, Science and Technology (including Crown Research Institutes); Spokesman for Tertiary Education; Associate Spokesman for ACC; Member, Social Services Select Committee
23	Shane Ardern	MP for Taranaki-King Country	130,000	Spokesman for Biosecurity; Spokesman for Customs; Spokesman for Forestry; Chairperson, Government Administration Select Committee
24	Richard Worth	List MP	130,000	Spokesman for Economic Development; Associate Spokesman for Ethnic Affairs; Associate Spokesman for Justice; Chairperson, Regulations Review Select Committee; Member, Justice and Electoral Select Committee
25	Tau Henare	List MP	118,000	Spokesman for Maori Affairs (Education and TPK); Member, Maori Affairs Select Committee
26	Jonathan Coleman	MP for Northcote	118,000	Spokesman for Broadcasting; Associate Spokesman for Health; Member, Health Select Committee
27	Clem Simich	List MP	152,000	Deputy Speaker of the House of Representatives; Associate Spokesman for Foreign Affairs; Deputy-Chairperson, Officers of Parliament Select Committee; Member, Standing Orders Select Committee
28	Kate Wilkinson	List MP	118,000	Spokeswoman for Consumer Affairs; Spokeswoman for Labour and Industrial Relations; Associate Spokeswoman for Justice; Member, Law and Order Select Committee; Member, Regulations Review Select Committee
29	Eric Roy	MP for Invercargill	118,000	Spokesman for Outdoor Recreation; Associate Spokesman for Conservation; Member, Local Government and Environment Select Committee; Member, Regulations Review Select Committee
30	Sandra Goudie	MP for Coromandel	118,000	Spokeswoman for Internal Affairs; Spokeswoman for Senior Citizens; Associate Spokeswoman for Local Government; Member, Government Administration Select Committee
	Chris Auchinvole	List MP	118,000	Associate Spokesman for Energy (Mining); Associate Spokesman for Tourism; Member, Commerce Select Committee
	David Bennett	MP for Hamilton East	118,000	Associate Spokesman for Transport; Member, Transport and Industrial Relations Select Committee
	Paula Bennett	List MP	118,000	Associate Spokeswoman for Education (Early Childhood); Associate Spokeswoman for Labour and Industrial Relations; Liaison for the Community and Voluntary Sector; Member, Social Services Select Committee
	Jackie Blue	List MP	118,000	Spokeswoman for Women's Affairs; Associate Spokeswoman for Health; Liaison with Women's Groups; Member, Health Select Committee
	Mark Blumsky	List MP	118,000	Associate Spokesman for Economic Development; Associate Spokesman for Local Government; Member, Local Government and Environment Select Committee
	Chester Borrows	MP for Whanganui	118,000	Spokesman for Police; Associate Spokesman for Welfare; Member, Law and Order Select Committee
	Bob Clarkson	MP for Tauranga	118,000	Associate Spokesman for Building and Construction; Associate Spokesman for Housing; Member, Transport and Industrial Relations Select Committee
	Brian Connell	MP for Rakaia	118,000	Member, Government Administration Select Committee
	Jacqui Dean	MP for Otago	118,000	Associate Spokeswoman for Environment/RMA; Member, Education and Science Select Committee
	Craig Foss	MP for Tukituki	118,000	Associate Spokesman for Agriculture (Horticulture); Associate Spokesman for Finance; Member, Finance and Expenditure Select Committee
	Jo Goodhew	MP for Aoraki	118,000	Associate Spokeswoman for Health; Member, Health Select Committee
	Nathan Guy	List MP	118,000	Junior Whip; Associate Spokesman for Agriculture; Liaison with Senior Citizens; Member, Primary Production Select Committee
	John Hayes	MP for Wairarapa	118,000	Associate Spokesman for Foreign Affairs and Trade (Pacific Affairs and Official Development Aids); Member, Foreign Affairs, Trade and Defence Select Committee
	Colin King	MP for Kaikoura	118,000	Associate Spokesman for Education (Trade Training); Member, Education and Science Select Committee; Member, Primary Production Select Committee
	Allan Peachey	MP for Tamaki	118,000	Associate Spokesman for Education; Member, Education and Science Select Committee
	Katrina Shanks	List MP	118,000	Associate Spokeswoman for Commerce; Associate Spokeswoman for Economic Development; Member, Social Services Committee
	Chris Tremain	MP for Napier	118,000	Associate Spokesman for Economic Development; Associate Spokesman for Small Business; Liaison with Small Business; Member, Commerce Select Committee; Member, Finance and Expenditure Select Committee
	Nicky Wagner	List MP	118,000	Spokeswoman for Youth Affairs; Associate Spokeswoman for Arts, Culture and Heritage; Associate Spokeswoman for Environment/RMA; Member, Justice and Electoral Select Committee

== New Zealand First's parliamentary caucus ==
	Name	Electorate/List	Salary (as of 1 July 2005)	Caucus Responsibilities
1	Winston Peters	List MP	183,000	Parliamentary leader of the New Zealand First; Minister of Foreign Affairs; Minister for Racing; Associate Minister for Senior Citizens; Spokesman for Finance; Spokesman for Immigration; Member, Privileges Select Committee
2	Peter Brown	List MP	118,000	Deputy-Parliamentary leader of the New Zealand First; Party Whip; Spokesman for ACC; Spokesman for Customs; Spokesman for Energy; Spokesman for Internal Affairs; Spokesman for Labour and Industrial Relations; Spokesman for Transport; Associate Spokesman for Immigration; Member, Business Select Committee; Member, Officers of Parliament Select Committee; Member, Standing Orders Select Committee; Member, Transport and Industrial Relations Select Committee
3	Brian Donnelly	List MP	130,000	Spokesman for Arts and Culture; Spokesman for Biosecurity; Spokesman for Communications and Information Technology; Spokesman for Crown Research Institutes (CRIS); Spokesman for Education; Spokesman for Education Review Office (ERO); Spokesman for Industry Training; Spokesman for Local Government; Spokesman for Pacific Island Affairs; Spokesman for Regional Development; Spokesman for Science and Technology; Chairperson, Education and Science Select Committee
4	Ron Mark	List MP	122,000	Spokesman for Civil Defence; Spokesman for Corrections; Spokesman for Defence; Spokesman for Disarmament and Arms Control; Spokesman for Law and Order; Spokesman for Mental Health; Spokesman for Police; Spokesman for Sport and Recreation; Spokesman for Veterans' Affairs; Spokesman for Youth Affairs; Deputy-Chairperson, Law and Order Select Committee
5	Pita Paraone	List MP	118,000	Spokesman for Broadcasting; Spokesman for Fisheries; Spokesman for Housing; Spokesman for Maori Affairs; Member, Maori Affairs Select Committee
6	Barbara Stewart	List MP	118,000	Spokeswoman for Consumer Affairs; Spokeswoman for Family (including Disability, Senior Citizens and Women's Affairs); Spokeswoman for Health; Spokeswoman for Social Services; Spokeswoman for Tourism; Member, Health Select Committee
7	Doug Woolerton	List MP	118,000	Spokesman for Agriculture; Spokesman for Conservation; Spokesman for Economic Development; Spokesman for Environment; Spokesman for Forestry; Spokesman for Land Information; Spokesman for Primary Production; Spokesman for Rural Affairs; Member, Finance and Expenditure Select Committee

== United Future Party's parliamentary caucus ==
	Name	Electorate/List	Salary (as of 1 July 2005)	Caucus Responsibilities
1	Peter Dunne	MP for Ohariu-Belmont	183,000	Parliamentary leader of the United Future Party; Minister of Revenue; Associate Minister of Health; Spokesman for Foreign Affairs and Defence; Spokesman for Heritage; Spokesman for Justice; Spokesman for State Sector; Member, Privileges Committee; Member, Standing Orders Committee; Member, Justice & Electoral Member for an item of business Committee
2	Judy Turner	List MP	118,000	Deputy-Parliamentary leader of the United Future Party; Spokeswoman for Education and Research; Spokeswoman for Family and Social Services; Spokeswoman for Health; Spokeswoman for Maori and Treaty Issues; Member, Business Committee; Member, Finance and Expenditure Committee; Member, Social Services Committee

== Independents' parliamentary caucus ==
Name	Electorate/List	Salary (as of 1 July 2005)	Caucus Responsibilities
Taito Phillip Field	MP for Mangere	118,000	Member, Foreign Affairs, Defence and Trade Committee
Gordon Copeland	List MP	122,000	Deputy-Chairperson, Commerce Committee
