= Dail Jones =

New Zealand politician (born 1944)

Dail Jones QSO

Member of the New Zealand Parliament for Waitemata
- In office 29 November 1975 – 26 October 1978
- Preceded by: Michael Bassett
- Succeeded by: Constituency abolished

Member of the New Zealand Parliament for Helensville
- In office 25 November 1978 – 15 June 1984
- Preceded by: New constituency
- Succeeded by: Constituency abolished

Member of the New Zealand Parliament for New Zealand First party list
- In office 27 July 2002 – 17 September 2005
- In office 15 February 2008 – 8 November 2008
- Preceded by: Brian Donnelly (Note: Normally, list MPs do not have individual predecessors or successors, but Donnelly resigned during a sitting parliament and therefore was succeeded by Jones.)

Party president of New Zealand First
- In office 2005–2006
- Preceded by: Doug Woolerton
- Succeeded by: George Groombridge

Personal details
- Born: 7 July 1944 (age 82) Karachi, British India
- Party: National (1975–1984); New Zealand First (2002–2008)

Dail Michael John Jones QSO (born 7 July 1944) is a New Zealand politician. He has been a member of the New Zealand First party, and was formerly in the National Party.

== Early life ==
Jones was born in Karachi, British India, and attended St Joseph's College Quetta and Garrison School, Quetta and Karachi Grammar School. He and his mother arrived in New Zealand in 1960, and he completed his education at St Paul's College, Auckland, and the University of Auckland, from where he earned an LLB. He began practice as a lawyer.

== Member of Parliament ==
New Zealand Parliament
Years	Term	Electorate	List	Party
1975–1978	38th	Waitemata		National
1978–1981	39th	Helensville		National
1981–1984	40th	Helensville		National
2002–2005	47th	List	10	NZ First
2008	48th	List	10	NZ First

In the 1975 election, Jones was elected MP for Waitemata, standing as a National Party candidate. As such Dail Jones was the first person from Pakistan to become a New Zealand Member of Parliament. In the following election, the Waitemata seat was abolished, and Jones was elected as the MP for Helensville. He retained this electorate until the 1984 election, when Helensville electorate was abolished. Jones contested the new West Auckland electorate, but was defeated by the Labour Party candidate, Jack Elder.

Jones was Junior Whip for National in 1979. From April 1982 to June 1984, Jones was Deputy Chairman of Committees.

Jones is known as one of the few New Zealand MPs to have been injured in a politically motivated attack; in 1980, while serving as a National Party MP, he was stabbed in the chest by an elderly constituent in his electorate office leaving him with a punctured lung. The assailant, Ambrose Tindall, was obsessed about a traffic ticket totaling $15.

=== New Zealand First ===
Considerably later, in the 2002 election, Jones returned to Parliament as a list MP for the New Zealand First party, which had been established during Jones' time outside Parliament. He was ranked in tenth place on the New Zealand First list. He was New Zealand First spokesperson on foreign affairs, trade, customs, the courts, and the attorney-general's role. He lost his seat in the 2005 election, when he was again tenth on the party list (the lowest list MP elected in 2005 was Pita Paraone, who was ranked seventh). He was elected President of New Zealand First when Doug Woolerton resigned.

In 2007 there were frictions between Jones, Doug Woolerton and New Zealand First social liberal Brian Donnelly over the repeal of Section 59 of the Crimes Act 1961, legislation that allowed the use of parental corporal punishment against children (or spanking).

Dail Jones stated that "custard is more dangerous than second-hand smoke. ...[and] milk ... is worse than second-hand smoke".

He also attracted criticism in February 2008 from Winston Peters for suggesting that New Zealand First had received large anonymous donations.

On 15 February 2008, Jones was returned to Parliament as a list MP once more, replacing Brian Donnelly, who had been appointed as New Zealand's High Commissioner to the Cook Islands. He was tenth on the New Zealand First party list in 2005. Two people ahead of him on the party list, Susan Baragwanath and Jim Peters, declined the position, and he resigned as party President after becoming an MP.

In March 2008, he was critical of fellow NZ First MP Peter Brown's views on Asian immigration.

In the 2008 election, Jones was 14th on the New Zealand First party list, but the party lost all its parliamentary seats, winning no electorates and polling below the 5% threshold. He left politics after this election.

== Honours ==
In the 2006 New Year Honours, Jones was appointed a Companion of the Queen's Service Order, for public services.

== Notes ==
New Zealand Parliament
Preceded by Michael Bassett	Member of Parliament for Waitemata; 1975–1978	Constituency abolished
New constituency	Member of Parliament for Helensville; 1978–1984	Vacant constituency recreated in 2002 Title next held by John Key
Party political offices
Preceded by Doug Woolerton	President of New Zealand First; 2005–2006	Succeeded by George Groombridge
