= 48th New Zealand Parliament =

Term of the Parliament of New Zealand

48th Parliament of New Zealand
←	47th Parliament	49th Parliament	→
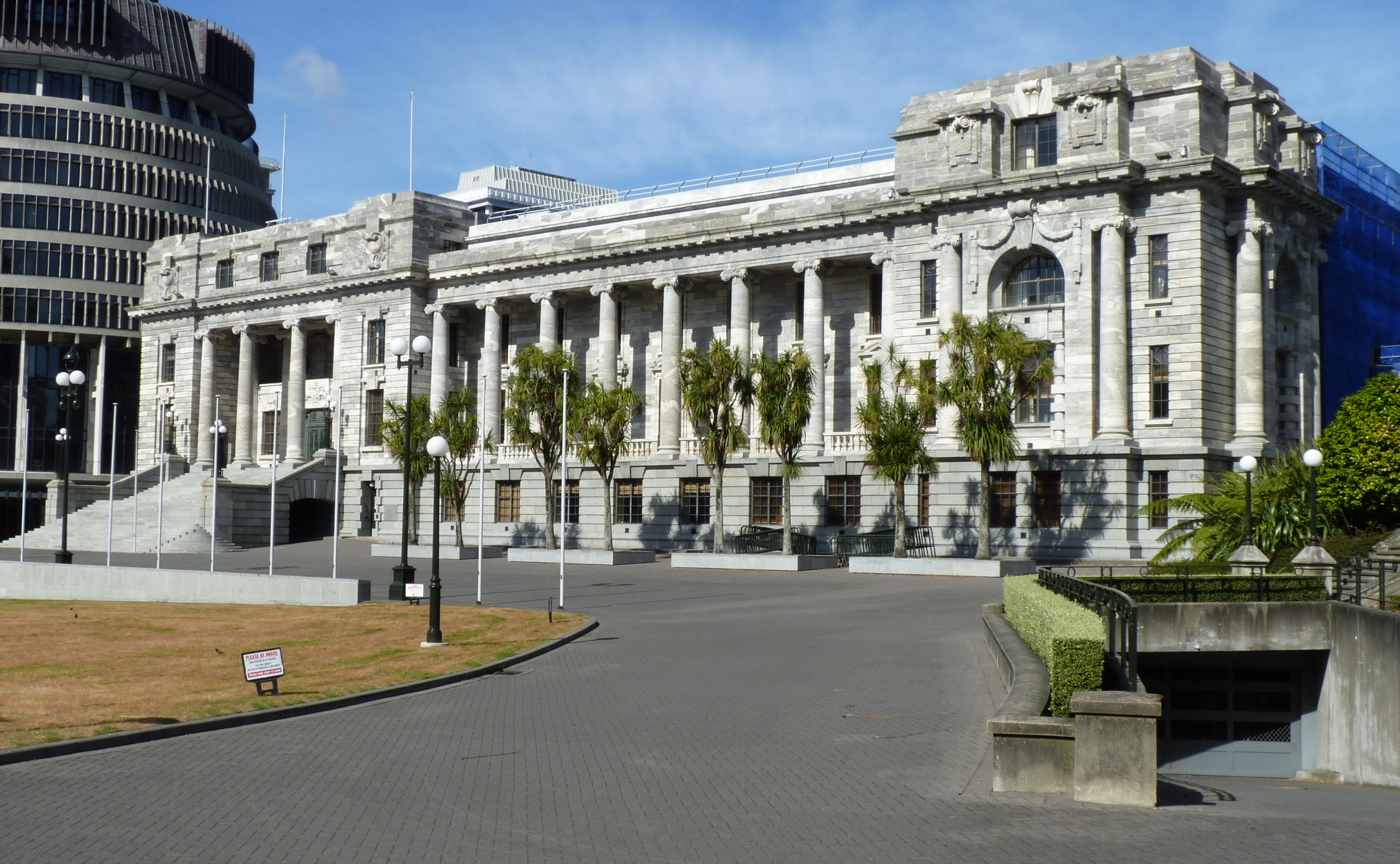
- Parliament House, Wellington

Overview
- Legislative body: New Zealand Parliament
- Term: 7 November 2005 – 3 October 2008
- Election: 2005 New Zealand general election
- Government: Fifth Labour Government

House of Representatives
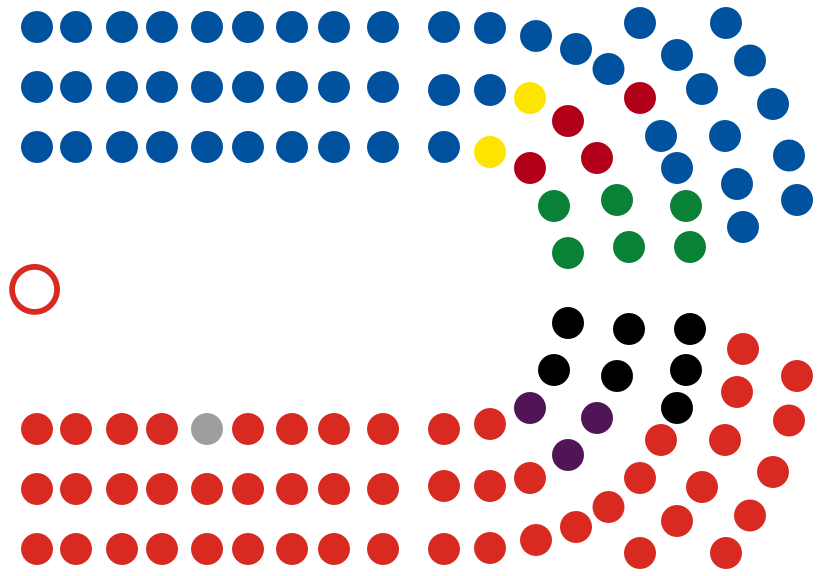
- Members: 121
- Speaker of the House: Margaret Wilson
- Leader of the House: Michael Cullen
- Prime Minister: Helen Clark
- Leader of the Opposition: John Key — Don Brash until 27 November 2006

Sovereign
- Monarch: Elizabeth II
- Governor-General: Anand Satyanand from 23 August 2006 — Silvia Cartwright until 4 August 2006

The 48th New Zealand Parliament was a term of the Parliament of New Zealand. Its composition was determined at a general election held on 17 September 2005. The new parliament met for the first time on 7 November 2005. It was dissolved on 3 October 2008.

The Labour Party and the Progressive Party, backed by New Zealand First and United Future, established a majority at the beginning the 48th Parliament. The Labour-led administration was in its third term. The National Party and ACT form the formal opposition to the government. Other non-government parties are the Greens (who promised to abstain on confidence and supply votes) and the Māori Party.

The 48th Parliament consists of 121 representatives. This represents an overhang of one seat, with the Māori Party having won one more electorate than its share of the vote would otherwise have given it. In total, sixty-nine of the MPs were chosen by geographical electorates, including seven Māori electorates. The remainder were elected by means of party-list proportional representation under the MMP electoral system.

== Electorate boundaries for 48th Parliament ==
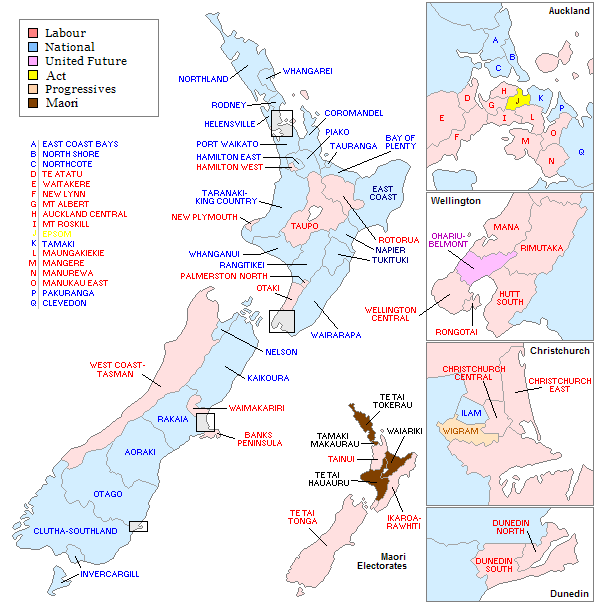

== Oath of office ==
All of the Māori Party MPs attempted to alter their oath of office by adding references to the Treaty of Waitangi. They were all required to retake their oaths.

== Election result ==
Summary of the 17 September 2005 election for the House of Representatives
Party	Party vote			Electorate vote			Seats			
Party	Votes	%	Change (pp)	Votes	%	Change (pp)	List	Electorate	Total	+/-
Labour	935,319	41.10	▼0.16	902,072	40.35	▼4.34	19	31	50	▼2
National	889,813	39.10	▲18.17	902,874	40.38	▲9.84	17	31	48	▲21
NZ First	130,115	5.72	▼4.66	78,117	3.49	▼0.49	7	0	7	▼6
Green	120,521	5.30	▼1.70	92,164	4.12	▼1.23	6	0	6	▼3
Māori Party	48,263	2.12	new	75,076	3.36	new	0	4	4	new
United Future	60,860	2.67	▼4.02	63,486	2.84	▼1.52	2	1	3	▼5
ACT	34,469	1.51	▼5.63	44,071	1.97	▼1.58	1	1	2	▼7
Progressive	26,441	1.16	▼0.54	36,638	1.64	▼0.20	0	1	1	▼1
Destiny	14,210	0.62	new	17,608	0.79	new	0	0	0	new
Legalise Cannabis	5,748	0.25	▼0.39	2,601	0.12	▼0.05	0	0	0	Steady
Christian Heritage	2,821	0.12	▼1.23	1,296	0.06	▼1.99	0	0	0	Steady
Alliance	1,641	0.07	▼1.20	1,901	0.09	▼1.60		0	0	Steady
Family Rights	1,178	0.05	new	1,045	0.05	new	0	0	0	new
Democrats	1,079	0.05	new	565	0.03	new	0	0	0	new
Libertarianz	946	0.04	▲0.04	781	0.03	Steady	0	0	0	Steady
Direct Democracy	782	0.03	new	1,934	0.09	new		0	0	new
99 MP	601	0.03	new	—	—	—	0	0	0	new
One NZ	478	0.02	▼0.07	214	0.01	▼0.12		0	0	Steady
RONZ	344	0.02	new	131	0.01	new	0	0	0	new
Unregistered parties	—	—	—	1,466	0.07	▼0.12	0	0	0	Steady
Independent	—	—	—	11,829	0.53	▼0.22	0	0	0	Steady
Valid votes	2,275,629	98.77	▼0.07	2,235,869	97.04	▼0.05				
Informal votes	10,561	0.46	▲0.04	24,801	1.08	▼0.21				
Disallowed votes	17,815	0.77	▲0.03	43,335	1.88	▲0.26				
Total	2,304,005	100		2,304,005	100		52	69	121	▲1
Eligible voters and Turnout	2,847,396	80.92	▲3.94	2,847,396	80.92	▲3.94				

Government: the third and final term of the Fifth Labour Government, in power from 1999 until 2008; minority coalition with Progressive Party since 2002
Prime Minister: Helen Clark (Labour) from 1999 to 2008
Governor General: Dame Silvia Cartwright to August 2006; Anand Satyanand August 2006–
Deputy Prime Minister: Michael Cullen (Labour) 2002–2008
Leader of the Opposition: Don Brash (National Party), to November 2006; John Key (National) November 2006 –
Speaker : Margaret Wilson (Labour)
Deputy Speaker: Clem Simich (National)
Assistant Speaker: Ross Robertson (Labour) and Ann Hartley (Labour)
Leader of the House: Michael Cullen (Labour)

== Overview of seats ==
The table below shows the number of MPs in each party following the 2005 election and at dissolution:

Affiliation	Members	
Affiliation	At 2005 election	At dissolution
Labour	50	49
Progressive	1	1
United Future ^{CS}	3	2
NZ First ^{CS}	7	7
Government total	61	59
Green ^{C}	6	6
Government with Cooperation total	67	65
National	48	48
ACT	2	2
Māori Party	4	4
Independent	0	2
Opposition total	54	56
Total	121	121
Working Government majority ^{[3]}	7	3
Working Government with Cooperation majority	13	9

Notes

- ^CS United Future and NZ First supported the Labour–Progressive coalition on a confidence and supply basis.
- ^C The Greens entered into a cooperation agreement with Labour, under which they agreed to abstain on matters of confidence and supply.
- ^{3} The Working Government majority is calculated as all Government MPs less all other parties. The Greens are excluded from the calculation of "all other parties" due to their abstention from confidence and supply, thereby lowering the majority threshold required to secure confidence and supply.

== Members of the 48th Parliament ==
48th New Zealand Parliament – MPs elected to Parliament

List MPs are ordered by allocation as determined by the Chief Electoral Office and the party lists.

Party	Name	Electorate	Term
National	Jo Goodhew	Aoraki	First
Labour	Judith Tizard	Auckland Central	Sixth
Labour	Ruth Dyson	Banks Peninsula	Fifth
National	Tony Ryall	Bay of Plenty	Sixth
Labour	Tim Barnett	Christchurch Central	Fourth
Labour	Lianne Dalziel	Christchurch East	Sixth
National	Judith Collins	Clevedon	Second
National	Bill English	Clutha-Southland	Sixth
National	Sandra Goudie	Coromandel	Second
Labour	Pete Hodgson	Dunedin North	Sixth
Labour	David Benson-Pope	Dunedin South	Third
National	Anne Tolley	East Coast	Second
National	Murray McCully	East Coast Bays	Seventh
ACT	Rodney Hide	Epsom	Fourth
National	David Bennett	Hamilton East	First
Labour	Martin Gallagher	Hamilton West	Fourth
National	John Key	Helensville	Second
Labour	Trevor Mallard	Hutt South	Seventh
National	Gerry Brownlee	Ilam	Fourth
National	Eric Roy	Invercargill	Fourth
National	Colin King	Kaikōura	First
Labour	Winnie Laban	Mana	Third
Labour	Taito Phillip Field	Mangere	Fifth
Labour	Ross Robertson	Manukau East	Seventh
Labour	George Hawkins	Manurewa	Sixth
Labour	Mark Gosche	Maungakiekie	Fourth
Labour	Helen Clark	Mount Albert	Ninth
Labour	Phil Goff	Mount Roskill	Eighth
National	Chris Tremain	Napier	First
National	Nick Smith	Nelson	Sixth
Labour	David Cunliffe	New Lynn	Third
Labour	Harry Duynhoven	New Plymouth	Sixth
National	Wayne Mapp	North Shore	Fourth
National	Jonathan Coleman	Northcote	First
National	John Carter	Northland	Seventh
United Future	Peter Dunne	Ohariu-Belmont	Eighth
National	Jacqui Dean	Otago	First
Labour	Darren Hughes	Otaki	Second
National	Maurice Williamson	Pakuranga	Seventh
Labour	Steve Maharey	Palmerston North	Sixth
National	Lindsay Tisch	Piako	Third
National	Paul Hutchison	Port Waikato	Third
National	Brian Connell	Rakaia	Second
National	Simon Power	Rangitikei	Third
Labour	Paul Swain	Rimutaka	Sixth
National	Lockwood Smith	Rodney	Eighth
Labour	Annette King	Rongotai	Seventh
Labour	Steve Chadwick	Rotorua	Third
National	Allan Peachey	Tamaki	First
National	Shane Ardern	Taranaki-King Country	Fourth
Labour	Mark Burton	Taupo	Fifth
National	Bob Clarkson	Tauranga	First
Labour	Chris Carter	Te Atatu	Fourth
National	Craig Foss	Tukituki	First
Labour	Clayton Cosgrove	Waimakariri	Third
National	John Hayes	Wairarapa	First
Labour	Lynne Pillay	Waitakere	Second
Labour	Marian Hobbs	Wellington Central	Fourth
Labour	Damien O'Connor	West Coast-Tasman	Fifth
National	Chester Borrows	Whanganui	First
National	Phil Heatley	Whangarei	Third
Progressive	Jim Anderton	Wigram	Eighth
Labour	Parekura Horomia	Ikaroa-Rāwhiti	Third
Labour	Nanaia Mahuta	Tainui	Fourth
Māori Party	Pita Sharples	Tāmaki Makaurau	First
Māori Party	Tariana Turia	Te Tai Hauāuru	Fourth
Māori Party	Hone Harawira	Te Tai Tokerau	First
Labour	Mahara Okeroa	Te Tai Tonga	Third
Māori Party	Te Ururoa Flavell	Waiariki	First
NZ First	Winston Peters	Party list, rank 01	Ninth
Green	Jeanette Fitzsimons	Party list, rank 01	Fourth
NZ First	Peter Brown	Party list, rank 02	Fourth
Green	Rod Donald	Party list, rank 02	Fourth
NZ First	Brian Donnelly	Party list, rank 03	Fourth
Green	Sue Bradford	Party list, rank 03	Third
United Future	Judy Turner	Party list, rank 02	Second
NZ First	Ron Mark	Party list, rank 04	Fourth
Green	Sue Kedgley	Party list, rank 04	Third
Labour	Michael Cullen	Party list, rank 02	Ninth
NZ First	Doug Woolerton	Party list, rank 05	Fourth
Labour	Margaret Wilson	Party list, rank 03	Third
National	Don Brash	Party list, rank 01	Second
Labour	Dover Samuels	Party list, rank 10	Fourth
National	David Carter	Party list, rank 08	Fifth
Labour	Jim Sutton	Party list, rank 11	Seventh
Green	Keith Locke	Party list, rank 05	Third
National	Katherine Rich	Party list, rank 10	Third
Labour	Mita Ririnui	Party list, rank 15	Third
National	Tim Groser	Party list, rank 13	First
Labour	Rick Barker	Party list, rank 21	Fifth
National	Richard Worth	Party list, rank 16	Third
Labour	Jill Pettis	Party list, rank 24	Fifth
National	Clem Simich	Party list, rank 18	Sixth
United Future	Gordon Copeland	Party list, rank 03	Second
Labour	Ashraf Choudhary	Party list, rank 25	Second
National	Georgina te Heuheu	Party list, rank 19	Fourth
Labour	Shane Jones	Party list, rank 27	First
NZ First	Barbara Stewart	Party list, rank 06	Second
National	Pansy Wong	Party list, rank 20	Fourth
Labour	Dianne Yates	Party list, rank 28	Fifth
ACT	Heather Roy	Party list, rank 02	Second
Labour	Ann Hartley	Party list, rank 30	Third
National	Chris Finlayson	Party list, rank 27	First
Labour	Georgina Beyer	Party list, rank 35	Third
National	Nicky Wagner	Party list, rank 28	First
Green	Metiria Turei	Party list, rank 06	Second
Labour	Maryan Street	Party list, rank 36	First
National	Tau Henare	Party list, rank 29	Third
Labour	David Parker	Party list, rank 37	Second
National	Chris Auchinvole	Party list, rank 34	First
Labour	Russell Fairbrother	Party list, rank 38	Second
National	Mark Blumsky	Party list, rank 36	First
Labour	Dave Hereora	Party list, rank 39	Second
NZ First	Pita Paraone	Party list, rank 07	Second
National	Kate Wilkinson	Party list, rank 38	First
Labour	Moana Mackey	Party list, rank 41	Second
National	Nathan Guy	Party list, rank 39	First
Labour	Sue Moroney	Party list, rank 42	First
National	Jackie Blue	Party list, rank 41	First
Labour	Darien Fenton	Party list, rank 43	First
National	Paula Bennett	Party list, rank 45	First

== Changes during parliamentary term ==
Party	New MP	Term started	Seat	Previous MP
Green	Nándor Tánczos	6 November 2005	List	Rod Donald^{1}
Labour	Charles Chauvel	1 August 2006	List	Jim Sutton
National	Katrina Shanks	7 February 2007	List	Don Brash
Labour	Lesley Soper	15 February 2007	List	Georgina Beyer
NZ First	Dail Jones	15 February 2008	List	Brian Donnelly^{2}
Labour	Louisa Wall	4 March 2008	List	Ann Hartley
Labour	William Sio	29 March 2008	List	Dianne Yates
Green	Russel Norman	26 June 2008	List	Nándor Tánczos
National	(vacant)	31 August 2008	Rakaia	Brian Connell^{3}
^{1} Rod Donald died before being sworn in as MP.^{2} Brian Donnelly was appointed as New Zealand's High Commissioner to the Cook Islands.^{3} Brian Connell retired from Parliament effective 31 August 2008, leaving his seat of Rakaia vacant.
Taito Phillip Field, Labour MP for Māngere, quit the Labour party after being threatened with expulsion on 16 February 2007. He continued to serve as an MP, and formed the New Zealand Pacific Party in January 2008. Gordon Copeland, a United Future list MP, left the party to become an independent MP in May 2007, and contested the 2008 election as a candidate for The Kiwi Party.

- Rod Donald, co-leader of the Green Party, died on 6 November 2005 before he was sworn in as a member of the 48th Parliament. He was replaced by the next person on the Green Party's list, former MP Nándor Tánczos, on 16 November.
- Jim Sutton, a Labour list MP, retired from politics on 31 July 2006. He was replaced by the next person on the Labour Party's list, Charles Chauvel.
- Don Brash, a National list MP and former leader of the National Party, retired from Parliament on 7 February 2007. He was replaced by the next person on the National Party's list, Katrina Shanks.
- Georgina Beyer, a Labour list MP, announced her retirement on 15 December 2006, and officially resigned from Parliament when it resumed on 13 February 2007. On 20 February she was replaced by the next person on the Labour Party's list, former MP Lesley Soper.
- Taito Phillip Field, Labour MP for Mangere, quit the Labour party after being threatened with expulsion on 16 February 2007. He continued to serve as an MP, and formed the New Zealand Pacific Party in January 2008.
- Gordon Copeland, a United Future list MP, left the party to become an independent MP in May 2007, and contested the 2008 election as a candidate for The Kiwi Party.
- Ann Hartley, a Labour list MP, was elected to the North Shore City Council in the 2007 local body elections. She left Parliament when it resumed in 2008, and was replaced by the next person on the Labour list, Louisa Wall, a former Silver Ferns netballer, on 4 February 2008.
- Brian Donnelly, a New Zealand First MP, resigned from Parliament from 12 February 2008, and was replaced by Dail Jones on 15 February 2008. Donnelly was appointed as New Zealand's High Commissioner to the Cook Islands.
- Dianne Yates, a Labour list MP, stood unsuccessfully for the Hamilton City Council in the 2007 local body elections. She resigned as an MP on 29 March 2008 and was replaced by William Sio on 1 April 2008 as the next person on Labour's list.
- Nándor Tánczos resigned from Parliament and was replaced by Green Party co-leader Russel Norman on 27 June 2008.

== Seating plan ==
=== Start of term ===
The chamber is in a horseshoe-shape.

													Coleman	Dean	Foss	C. King	Peachey
Simich	te Heuheu	Hutchison	Ardern	Heatley	Henare	Goudie	E. Roy	Connell	Auchinvole	D. Bennett	P. Bennett	Blue	Blumsky	Flavell		Goodhew	Tremain
Worth	Mapp	Tolley	Tisch	McCully	L. Smith	Williamson	Groser	Finlayson	J. Carter	Wong	H. Roy	Sharples/ Turia	Harawira		Borrows	Guy	Wagner
Power	Ryall	Brownlee	Brash	English	Key	N. Smith	Collins	Rich	D. Carter	Hide	Sharples/ Turia	Bradford		Kedgley	Clarkson	Hayes	Wilkinson
													Fitzsimons	Turei	Tánczos
Wilson															Locke
Wilson															Woolerton
													Peters	Mark	Paraone
Hodgson	Mallard	Cullen	CLARK	Anderton	Maharey	Goff	A. King	Horomia	Duynhoven	Ririnui	Dunne	Brown		Donnelly	Stewart	Pillay	Street
Dalziel	Burton	Hughes	Barnett	Dyson	C. Carter	Barker	Benson-Pope	O'Connor	Laban	Okeroa	Swain	Turner	Copeland		Gallagher	Hereora	Moroney
Hartley	Robertson	Parker	Cunliffe	Mahuta	Cosgrove	Sutton	Tizard	Samuels	Hawkins	Field	Gosche	Hobbs	Pettis	Yates	Choudhary	Fairbrother	Jones
													Beyer	Chadwick	Mackey	Fenton

=== End of term ===
The chamber is in a horseshoe-shape.

													Borrows	Clarkson	Dean	Blumsky	C. King
Simich	te Heuheu	Hutchison	Ardern	Worth	Henare	Coleman	Wilkinson	Rich	E. Roy	Goudie	Connell	Auchinvole	D. Bennett	Flavell		Foss	Peachey
Groser	Finlayson	Tremain	Guy	McCully	L. Smith	Mapp	Tisch	Wong	J. Carter	Heatley	H. Roy	Sharples/ Turia	Harawira		P. Bennett	Goodhew	Wagner
Collins	Ryall	English	Key	Brownlee	Power	N. Smith	Williamson	D. Carter	Tolley	Hide	Sharples/ Turia	Norman		Bradford	Blue	Hayes	Shanks
													Fitzsimons	Turei	Locke
Wilson															Kedgley
Wilson															Stewart
													Peters	Mark	Paraone
Cunliffe	C. Carter	Cullen	CLARK	Anderton	Goff	A. King	Hodgson	Horomia	Ririnui	Laban	Dunne	Brown		Woolerton	D. Jones	Chauvel	Field
Dalziel	Mallard	Moroney	Barnett	Dyson	Parker	Mahuta	Cosgrove	Barker	Okeroa	Burton	Gosche	Maharey	Turner		Choudhary	Fenton	Copeland
Robertson	Hobbs	Hughes	O'Connor	Chadwick	Street	S. Jones	Tizard	Duynhoven	Hawkins	Benson-Pope	Samuels	Swain	Pettis	Gallagher	Pillay	Mackey	Sio
													Fairbrother	Hereora	Soper	Wall

== See also ==
- Caucuses and MPs' responsibilities in the 48th New Zealand Parliament
