= Jim Peters (politician) =

New Zealand politician (1937–2026)

Jim Peters MNZM

Member of the New Zealand Parliament for New Zealand First party list
- In office 27 July 2002 – 17 September 2005

Chairperson of Northland Regional Council
- In office 1995–2001

Northland regional councillor for the Far North constituency
- In office 1989–2001

Personal details
- Born: James Leonard Peters; 27 September 1937 Kawakawa, New Zealand
- Died: 15 September 2026 (aged 88) Wellington, New Zealand
- Party: New Zealand First
- Relatives: Ian Peters (brother); Lynette Stewart (sister); Winston Peters (brother); Bree Peters (niece)
- Profession: Educator; politician

James Leonard Peters MNZM (27 September 1937 – 15 September 2026) was a New Zealand educator and politician. Born in Kawakawa, he was of Ngāti Wai and Clan McInnes descent.

== Life and career ==
Peters was born on 27 September 1937, the son of Leonard and Joan Merle Peters. He went to school at Whananaki Primary and Wesley College in Auckland. Further education followed at the University of Auckland (BA in History and Political Studies) and Auckland Teachers Training College (Diploma of Teaching).

He was a high school teacher and Head of the Department of History, Geography and Social Studies at Mount Albert Grammar School. From 1987 to mid-2002 he was Principal of Northland College in Kaikohe.

Peters was a councillor for the Far North constituency of the Northland Regional Council from 1989 to 2001. Peters also served as chairperson of the council from 1995 to 2001. In 1990, he was awarded the New Zealand 1990 Commemoration Medal.

New Zealand Parliament
Years	Term	Electorate	List	Party
2002–2005	47th	List	9	NZ First

He was a member of the New Zealand First party, which is led by his younger brother Winston Peters. Jim Peters entered Parliament as a list MP in the 2002 election.

Peters lost his list seat in the 2005 election after New Zealand First's share of the party vote declined from its 2002 result.

He was appointed Pro Vice-Chancellor (Maori) of the University of Auckland in 2006.

In February 2008, Peters could have re-entered Parliament as a New Zealand First list MP after the resignation of Brian Donnelly, but stood aside in favour of Dail Jones.

In the 2008 New Year Honours, Peters was appointed a Member of the New Zealand Order of Merit for services to local-body affairs, education, and the community.

Three members of his family, the others being his brothers Ian Peters and Winston Peters, have been members of parliament in New Zealand. Another brother, Ron Peters, stood for New Zealand First in Hobson in 1993, coming third; and for Northland in 1996, coming second.

Peters died in Wellington on 15 September 2026, at the age of 88.
