= 47th New Zealand Parliament =

Term of the Parliament of New Zealand

47th Parliament of New Zealand
←	46th Parliament	48th Parliament	→
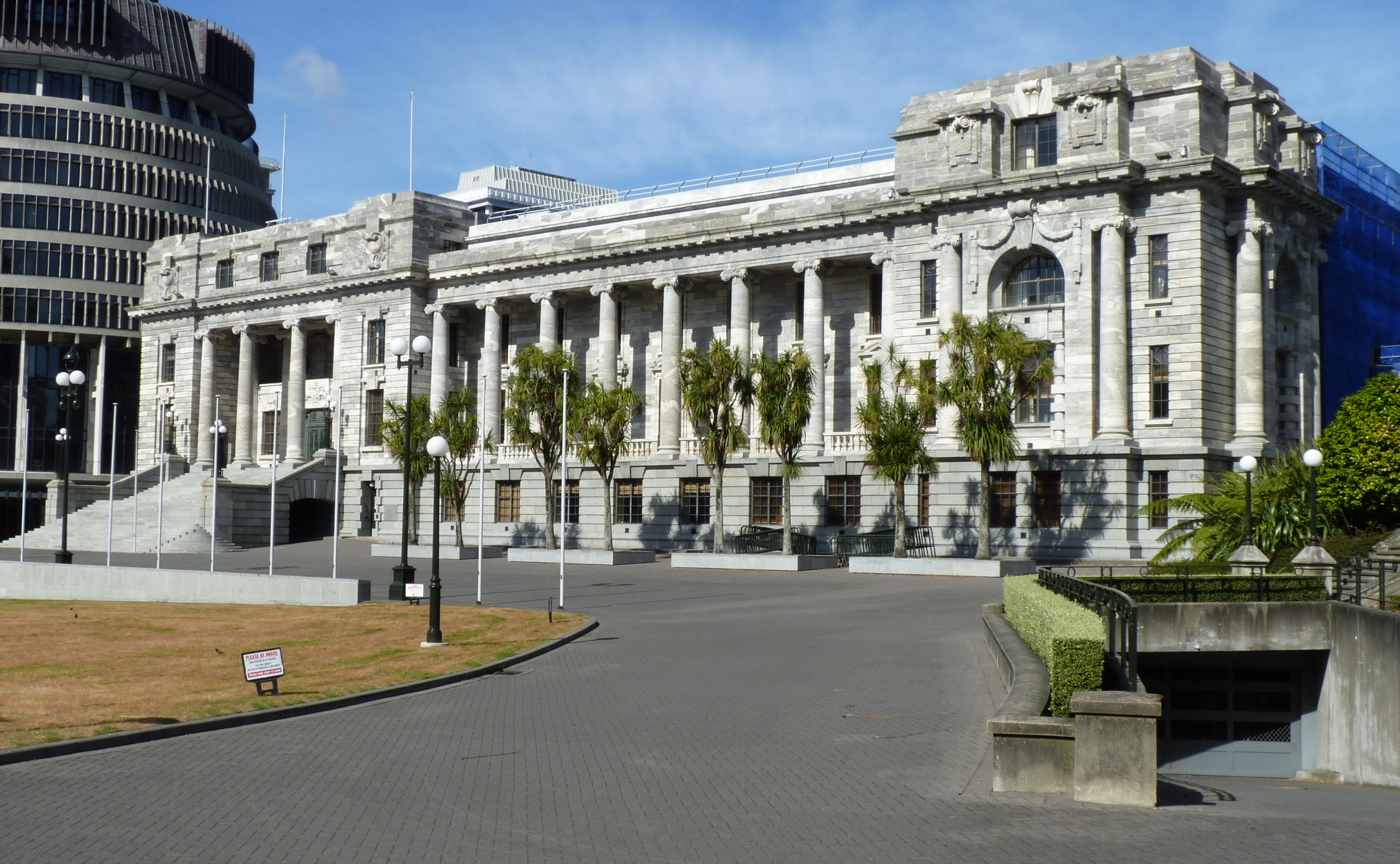
- Parliament House, Wellington

Overview
- Legislative body: New Zealand Parliament
- Term: 26 August 2002 – 2 August 2005
- Election: 2002 New Zealand general election
- Government: Fifth Labour Government

House of Representatives
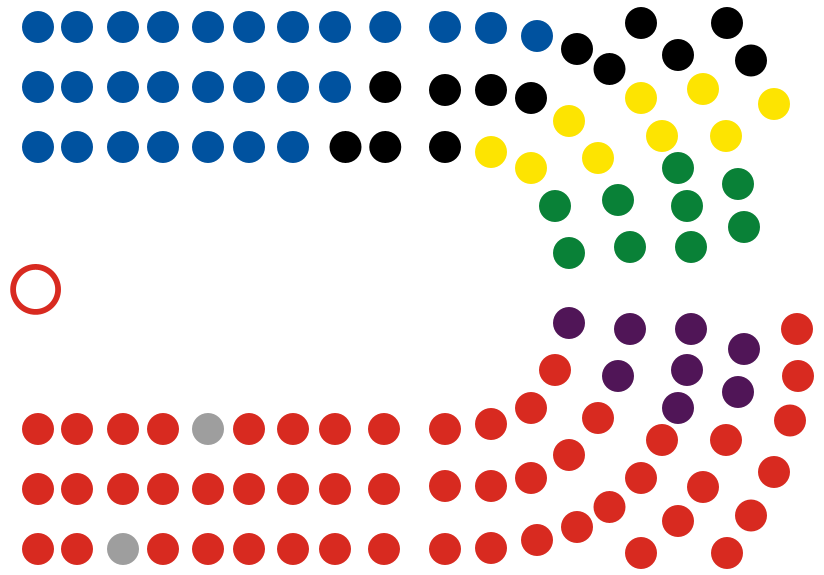
- Members: 120
- Speaker of the House: Margaret Wilson — Jonathan Hunt until 3 March 2005
- Leader of the House: Michael Cullen
- Prime Minister: Helen Clark
- Leader of the Opposition: Don Brash — Bill English until 28 October 2003

Sovereign
- Monarch: Elizabeth II
- Governor-General: Silvia Cartwright

The 47th New Zealand Parliament was a term of the Parliament of New Zealand. Its composition was determined by the 2002 election, and it sat until 11 August 2005.

The Labour Party and the Progressive Party, backed by United Future, commanded a majority throughout the 47th Parliament. The Labour-led administration was in its second term. The National Party, although dealt a significant blow in the last election, remained the largest opposition party. Other non-government parties were New Zealand First, ACT, the Greens, and (from mid-2004) Te Pāti Māori

The 47th Parliament consisted of 120 representatives. Sixty-nine of these were chosen by geographical electorates, including seven Māori electorates. The remainder were elected by means of party-list proportional representation under the MMP electoral system.

== Electoral boundaries for the 47th Parliament ==
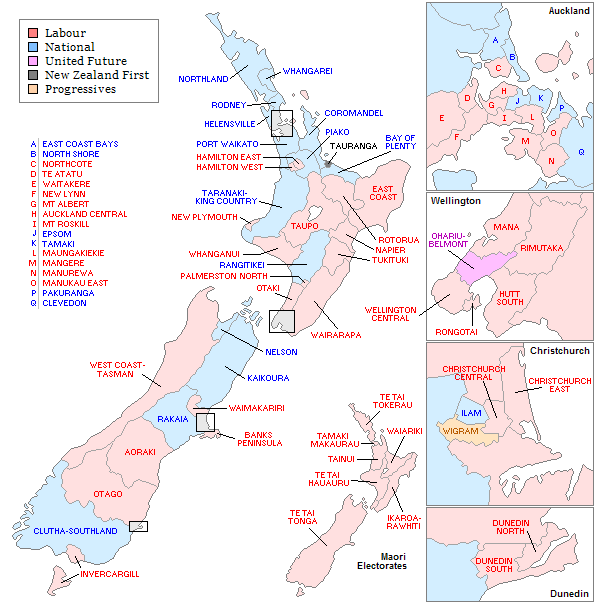

== Overview of seats ==
The table below shows the number of MPs in each party following the 2002 election and at dissolution:

Affiliation	Members	
Affiliation	At 2002 election	At dissolution
Labour	52	51
Progressive	2	2
United Future ^{CS}	8	8
Government total	62	61
National	27	27
NZ First	13	13
ACT	9	9
Green ^{C}	9	9
Māori Party	Not yet founded	1 ^{[1]}
Opposition total	58	59
Total	120	120
Working Government majority ^{[2]}	4	2

Notes

- ^CS United Future supported the Labour-Progressive coalition on a confidence and supply basis.
- ^C The relationship differs from that of the previous Parliament in that the Greens are no longer providing a guarantee of confidence and supply. Instead, the cooperation agreement provides for the government parties to consult with the Green Party and allow it input into shared policy and legislative initiatives.
- ^{1} Tariana Turia resigned as MP and from the Labour Party on 30 April 2004 following the foreshore and seabed controversy. She won the resulting by-election under the banner of the new Māori Party.
- ^{2} The Working Government majority is calculated as all Government MPs less all other parties.

== Initial composition of the 47th Parliament ==
The initial members of the 47th Parliament were as follows:

Party	Name	Electorate	Term
United Future New Zealand	Paul Adams	Party list	First
United Future New Zealand	Marc Alexander	Party list	First
Progressive	Jim Anderton	Wigram	Seventh
National	Shane Ardern	Taranaki-King Country	Third
ACT	Donna Awatere Huata	Party list	Third
United Future New Zealand	Larry Baldock	Party list	First
Labour	Rick Barker	Tukituki	Fourth
Labour	Tim Barnett	Christchurch Central	Third
Labour	David Benson-Pope	Dunedin South	Second
Labour	Georgina Beyer	Wairarapa	Second
Green	Sue Bradford	Party list	Second
National	Don Brash	Party list	First
NZ First	Peter Brown	Party list	Third
National	Gerry Brownlee	Ilam	Third
Labour	Mark Burton	Taupo	Fourth
Labour	Chris Carter	Te Atatū	Third
National	David Carter	Party list	Fourth
National	John Carter	Northland	Sixth
NZ First	Brent Catchpole	Party list	First
Labour	Stephanie Chadwick	Rotorua	Second
Labour	Ashraf Choudhary	Party list	First
Labour	Helen Clark	Mt Albert	Eighth
ACT	Deborah Coddington	Party list	First
National	Judith Collins	Clevedon	First
National	Brian Connell	Rakaia	First
United Future New Zealand	Gordon Copeland	Party list	First
Labour	Clayton Cosgrove	Waimakariri	Second
Labour	Michael Cullen	Party list	Eighth
Labour	David Cunliffe	New Lynn	Second
Labour	Lianne Dalziel	Christchurch East	Fifth
Green	Rod Donald	Party list	Third
NZ First	Brian Donnelly	Party list	Third
Labour	Helen Duncan	Party list	Third
United Future New Zealand	Peter Dunne	Ohariu-Belmont	Seventh
Labour	Harry Duynhoven	New Plymouth	Fifth
Labour	Ruth Dyson	Banks Peninsula	Fourth
ACT	Gerry Eckhoff	Party list	Second
National	Bill English	Clutha-Southland	Fifth
Green	Ian Ewen-Street	Party list	Second
Labour	Russell Fairbrother	Napier	First
ACT	Stephen Franks	Party list	Second
Labour	Taito Phillip Field	Mangere	Fourth
Green	Jeanette Fitzsimons	Party list	Third
Labour	Martin Gallagher	Hamilton West	Third
Labour	Phil Goff	Mt Roskill	Seventh
Labour	Mark Gosche	Maungakiekie	Third
National	Sandra Goudie	Coromandel	First
NZ First	Bill Gudgeon	Party list	First
Labour	Ann Hartley	Northcote	Second
Labour	George Warren Hawkins	Manurewa	Fifth
National	Phil Heatley	Whangarei	Second
Labour	Dave Hereora	Party list	First
ACT	Rodney Hide	Party list	Third
Labour	Marian Hobbs	Wellington Central	Third
Labour	Pete Hodgson	Dunedin North	Fifth
Labour	Parekura Horomia	Ikaroa-Rawhiti	Second
Labour	Darren Hughes	Otaki	First
Labour	Jonathan Hunt	Party list	Thirteenth
National	Paul Hutchison	Port Waikato	Second
NZ First	Dail Jones	Party list	Fourth
Green	Sue Kedgley	Party list	Second
Labour	Graham Kelly	Party list	Sixth
National	John Key	Helensville	First
Labour	Annette King	Rongotai	Sixth
Labour	Winnie Laban	Mana	Second
Green	Keith Locke	Party list	Second
Labour	Janet Mackey	East Coast	Fourth
Labour	Steve Maharey	Palmerston North	Fifth
Labour	Nanaia Mahuta	Tainui	Third
Labour	Trevor Mallard	Hutt South	Sixth
National	Wayne Mapp	North Shore	Third
NZ First	Ron Mark	Party list	Third
National	Murray McCully	East Coast Bays	Sixth
NZ First	Craig McNair	Party list	First
ACT	Muriel Newman	Party list	Third
Labour	Damien O'Connor	West Coast-Tasman	Fourth
United Future New Zealand	Bernie Ogilvy	Party list	First
Labour	Mahara Okeroa	Te Tai Tonga	Second
NZ First	Pita Paraone	Party list	First
Labour	David Parker	Otago	First
Labour	Mark Peck	Invercargill	Fourth
NZ First	Edwin Perry	Party list	First
NZ First	Jim Peters	Party list	First
NZ First	Winston Peters	Tauranga	Eighth
Labour	Jill Pettis	Whanganui	Fourth
Labour	Lynne Pillay	Waitakere	First
National	Simon Power	Rangitikei	Third
ACT	Richard Prebble	Party list	Ninth
National	Katherine Rich	Party list	Second
Labour	Mita Ririnui	Waiariki	Second
Labour	Ross Robertson	Manukau East	Sixth
Progressive	Matt Robson	Party list	Third
ACT	Heather Roy	Party list	First
National	Tony Ryall	Bay of Plenty	Fifth
Labour	Dover Samuels	Te Tai Tokerau	Third
National	Lynda Scott	Kaikoura	Second
ACT	Ken Shirley	Party list	Fifth
National	Clem Simich	Tamaki	Fifth
National	Lockwood Smith	Rodney	Seventh
United Future New Zealand	Murray Smith	Party list	First
National	Nick Smith	Nelson	Fifth
National	Roger Sowry	Party list	Fifth
NZ First	Barbara Stewart	Party list	First
Labour	Jim Sutton	Aoraki	Sixth
Labour	Paul Swain	Rimutaka	Fifth
Labour	John Tamihere	Tamaki Makaurau	Second
Green	Nándor Tánczos	Party list	Second
National	Georgina te Heuheu	Party list	Third
National	Lindsay Tisch	Piako	Second
Labour	Judith Tizard	Auckland Central	Fifth
Green	Metiria Turei	Party list	First
Labour	Tariana Turia	Te Tai Hauauru	Third
United Future New Zealand	Judy Turner	Party list	First
Green	Mike Ward	Party list	First
National	Maurice Williamson	Pakuranga	Sixth
Labour	Margaret Wilson	Party list	Second
National	Pansy Wong	Party list	Third
NZ First	Doug Woolerton	Party list	Third
National	Richard Worth	Epsom	Second
Labour	Dianne Yates	Hamilton East	Fourth

== By-elections during 47th Parliament ==
There was one by-election held during the term of the 47th Parliament.

Electorate and by-election		Date	Incumbent	Cause	Winner
Te Tai Hauauru	2004	10 July	Tariana Turia	Resignation	Tariana Turia

=== Summary of changes during term ===
- Graham Kelly, a Labour list MP, left Parliament on 29 July 2003 to take up a position as High Commissioner to Canada. Moana Mackey, the next candidate on Labour's party list, entered Parliament in his place.
- Donna Awatere Huata, an ACT list MP, was officially declared an independent on 11 November 2003. This followed her suspension from the ACT caucus on 11 February 2003 after allegations of fraud were made against her. After a lengthy legal fight which went all the way to the Supreme Court, she was expelled from Parliament on 19 November 2004. She was replaced by Kenneth Wang on 30 November.
- Tariana Turia, the Labour MP for Te Tai Hauauru, resigned from Parliament over the foreshore and seabed issue on 17 May 2004. On 10 July, Turia won the resulting by-election under the banner of the new Māori Party, and took her seat again on 27 July.
- Jonathan Hunt, a Labour list MP, left Parliament on 30 March 2005 to take up a position as High Commissioner to the United Kingdom. Lesley Soper, the next candidate on Labour's party list, was sworn in to replace him on 5 April.

== Seating plan ==
=== As on 10 August 2004 ===
The chamber is in a horseshoe-shape.

McNair	Gudgeon	Perry	Catchpole
Simich	Williamson	Sowry	Tisch	te Heuheu	Wong	Ardern	Heatley	Hutchison	Scott	Connell	Goudie	Paraone	Stewart	Eckhoff	Roy	Coddington
Worth	J. Carter	L. Smith	D. Carter	McCully	Key	Collins	Mapp	Mark	Jones	Woolerton	J. Peters	Shirley	Franks	Prebble	Turei
Ryall	N. Smith	Brownlee	Brash	Power	Rich	English	W. Peters	Brown	Donnelly	Hide	Newman	Fitzsimons	Tánczos	Locke	Ward	Awatere Huata
Donald	Bradford	Ewen-Street
Hunt	Kedgley
Ogilvy
Dunne	Copeland	Alexander
Mallard	Sutton	Cullen	CLARK	Anderton	Maharey	Goff	King	Hodgson	Duynhoven	Field	Cunliffe	Turia	Adams	Baldock	Turner	M. Mackey
Hobbs	Burton	Hughes	Pettis	Wilson	Horomia	Hawkins	Swain	Dyson	Ririnui	Okeroa	Dalziel	Laban	Robertson	Gosche	M. Smith	Pillay
Hartley	Tamihere	Robson	C. Carter	Barker	Benson-Pope	Tizard	Samuels	O'Connor	J. Mackey	Peck	Yates	Mahuta	Gallagher	Barnett	Cosgrove	Beyer	Parker
Duncan	Chadwick	Choudhary	Fairbrother	Hereora
