= Helensville (electorate) =

Coordinates: 36.6797°S 174.4494°E

- Former Single-member constituency for the New Zealand House of Representatives
- Location of within Auckland
- Region: Auckland

Former constituency
- Created: 1978 (original), 2002 (recreated)
- Abolished: 1984 (abolished), 2020 (re-abolished)
- Last MP: Chris Penk
- Party: National

Helensville was a New Zealand parliamentary electorate in the Auckland region, returning one Member of Parliament to the House of Representatives. The electorate was first established for the 1978 election, was abolished in 1984, and then reinstated for the 2002 election. The seat was won and held by John Key through his term as prime minister. Chris Penk of the National Party held the seat from the 2017 general election until its abolition in 2020, when it was replaced with the new Kaipara ki Mahurangi electorate, which Penk also retained.

== Population centres ==
The 1977 electoral redistribution, initiated by Robert Muldoon's National Government, was the most overtly political since the Representation Commission had been established through an amendment to the Representation Act in 1886. As part of the 1976 census, a large number of people failed to fill in an electoral re-registration card, and census staff had not been given the authority to insist on the card being completed. This had little practical effect for people on the general roll, but it transferred Māori to the general roll if the card was not handed in. Together with a northward shift of New Zealand's population, this resulted in five new electorates having to be created in the upper part of the North Island. The electoral redistribution was very disruptive, with 22 electorates being abolished, and 27 (including Helensville) being newly created or re-established. These changes came into effect for the 1978 election.

In the 1983 electoral redistribution, the Helensville electorate was abolished, and its area went to the West Auckland and Rodney electorates. Helensville was re-established in time for the 2002 election in response to continued high population growth in and around Auckland. It was formed from the northern flank of the Waitakere electorate with the addition of areas from the Rodney electorate around its southern boundary.

Helensville covers an area of the rapidly growing northern Auckland urban fringe, drawing Helensville and Kumeū from the former Rodney District, moving south to take in Paremoremo, Greenhithe and Albany from the former North Shore City, and finally tacking west to include Whenuapai, Hobsonville and West Harbour from the former Waitakere City.

The boundaries of the electorate changed significantly in the 2019/20 boundary review. Its northern boundary moved northward to become the same as the boundary between the Northland and Auckland local government regions, taking in part of the Northland electorate and all that part of Rodney electorate north of Waiwera, which is, by area, most of Rodney. On the other hand, an area running from Dairy Flat south to Paremoremo moved into Rodney, which is renamed the Whangaparāoa electorate. Helensville also gained the suburb of Westgate from the Upper Harbour electorate. It lost its southern section around the Waitakere Ranges to New Lynn. It was initially proposed that the electorate would keep the name Helensville, but after public submissions it became the Kaipara ki Mahurangi electorate.

== History ==
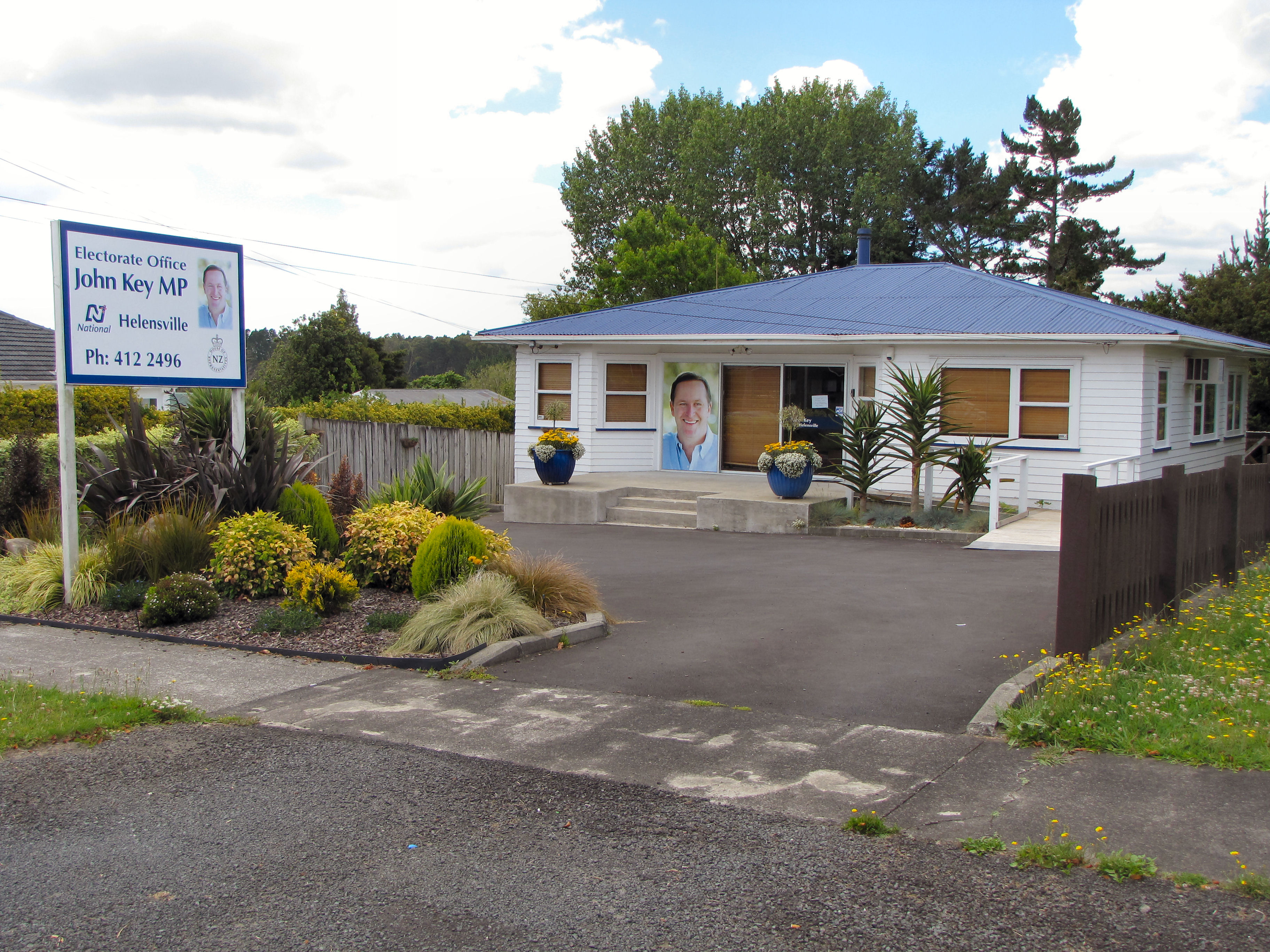
National Party electorate office at Huapai in 2009, during John Key's time

In the 1978 election, the Helensville electorate was won by Dail Jones, who had been MP for the Waitemata electorate since the 1975 election. When the Helensville electorate was abolished in 1984, Jones stood in the West Auckland electorate in the 1984 election but was defeated by the Labour Party candidate, Jack Elder.

The Helensville electorate was re-established for the 2002 election. Newcomer John Key beat sitting Waitakere MP Brian Neeson to the National Party nomination and, in a tight year for his party, won the electorate by 1,705 votes in a split field when a disgruntled Neeson stood as an independent. At the same election, Dail Jones contested the electorate for New Zealand First. Helensville was partly rural and was wealthy beyond the national average, making it a safe National electorate, and Key was returned easily in 2005, 2008, 2011 and 2014 with large majorities. Key became National Party leader in 2006 and prime minister in 2008. In December 2016, he announced that he would retire from politics before the 2017 general election. He was replaced as Helensville MP by Chris Penk.

=== Members of Parliament ===
Key

National NZ First Labour ACT Green

Election	Winner
1978 election	Dail Jones
1981 election	Dail Jones
Electorate abolished in 1984 (see West Auckland and Rodney)
2002 election	John Key
2005 election	John Key
2008 election	John Key
2011 election	John Key
2014 election	John Key
2017 election	Chris Penk
(Electorate abolished in 2020; see Kaipara ki Mahurangi)

=== List MPs ===
Members of Parliament elected from party lists in elections where that person also unsuccessfully contested the Helensville electorate. Unless otherwise stated, all MPs terms began and ended at general elections.

Election	Winner
2002 election	Dail Jones
2008	Dail Jones^{1}
2008 election	Darien Fenton
2008 election	David Garrett^{2}
2009	David Clendon^{3}
2014 election	Kennedy Graham

^{1} Jones entered Parliament in February 2008 following the resignation of Brian Donnelly
^{2} Garrett resigned in September 2010, and his list position was taken by Hilary Calvert
^{3} Clendon entered Parliament in October 2009 following the resignation of Sue Bradford

== Election results ==
=== 2017 election ===
2017 general election: Helensville
Notes:	Blue background denotes the winner of the electorate vote. Pink background denotes a candidate elected from their party list. Yellow background denotes an electorate win by a list member, or other incumbent. A ✓ or ✗ denotes status of any incumbent, win or lose respectively.						
Party	Candidate	Votes	%	±%	Party votes	%	±%
National	Chris Penk	21,704	56.12	−9.05	21,958	55.83	−2.56
Labour	Kurt Taogaga	7,096	18.35	+5.66	10,012	25.45	+12.95
Green	Hayley Holt	6,758	17.47	+4.75	2,971	7.55	−6.00
NZ First	Helen Peterson	2,403	6.21	—	2,795	7.11	−0.25
ACT	Alex Evans	284	0.73	−0.14	319	0.81	+0.07
Conservative					87	0.22	−4.56
Opportunities					799	2.03	—
Legalise Cannabis					112	0.28	−0.17
Māori Party					105	0.27	−0.27
United Future					27	0.07	−0.19
Outdoors					20	0.05	—
Ban 1080					20	0.05	−0.09
Mana Party					13	0.03	—
People's Party					12	0.03	—
Internet					9	0.02	—
Democrats					7	0.02	−0.04
Informal votes		264			67		
Total valid votes		38,676			39,333		
National hold	Majority	14,608	37.77	−14.69			

=== 2014 election ===
2014 general election: Helensville
Notes:	Blue background denotes the winner of the electorate vote. Pink background denotes a candidate elected from their party list. Yellow background denotes an electorate win by a list member, or other incumbent. A ✓ or ✗ denotes status of any incumbent, win or lose respectively.						
Party	Candidate	Votes	%	±%	Party votes	%	±%
National	✓ John Key	22,720	65.17	−9.21	20,689	58.39	−7.40
Green	Kennedy Graham	4,433	12.72	+5.36	4,801	13.55	+4.91
Labour	Corie Haddock	4,425	12.69	−1.45	4,430	12.50	−1.85
Internet	Laila Harré	1,315	3.77	+3.77			
Conservative	Deborah Dougherty	963	2.76	−0.07	1,692	4.78	+1.27
Independent	Penny Bright	420	1.20	+1.20			
ACT	Phelan Pirrie	302	0.87	+0.36	262	0.74	−0.65
Independent	Brendan Whyte	74	0.21	+0.21			
NZ First					2,608	7.36	+2.76
Internet Mana					338	0.95	+0.78 (Note: 2014 Internet Mana swing is relative to the votes for Mana in 2011; it shared a party list with Internet in the 2014 election.)
Māori Party					192	0.54	+0.02
Legalise Cannabis					161	0.45	−0.04
United Future					93	0.26	−0.20
Ban 1080					48	0.14	+0.14
Democrats					23	0.06	+0.04
Independent Coalition					13	0.04	+0.04
Civilian					8	0.02	+0.02
Focus					3	0.01	+0.01
Informal votes		208			73		
Total valid votes		34,860			35,434		
Turnout		35,507	82.29	+5.65			
National hold	Majority	18,287	52.46	−7.78			

=== 2011 election ===
2011 general election: Helensville
Notes:	Blue background denotes the winner of the electorate vote. Pink background denotes a candidate elected from their party list. Yellow background denotes an electorate win by a list member, or other incumbent. A ✓ or ✗ denotes status of any incumbent, win or lose respectively.						
Party	Candidate	Votes	%	±%	Party votes	%	±%
National	✓ John Key	26,011	74.38	+0.77	23,558	65.79	+2.09
Labour	Jeremy Greenbrook-Held	4,945	14.14	−2.97	5,138	14.35	−4.11
Green	Jeanette Elley	2,575	7.36	+1.41	3,094	8.64	+3.74
Conservative	Richard Drayson	941	2.69	+2.69	1,258	3.51	+3.51
Legalise Cannabis	Adrian McDermott	319	0.91	+0.91	174	0.49	+0.16
ACT	Nick Kearney	180	0.51	0–1.72	499	1.39	−5.31
NZ First					1,648	4.60	+2.06
Māori Party					186	0.52	+0.03
United Future					163	0.46	−0.33
Mana					60	0.17	+0.17
Libertarianz					19	0.05	-0.004
Democrats					8	0.02	+0.001
Alliance					4	0.01	−0.04
Informal votes		574			198		
Total valid votes		34,971			35,809		
National hold	Majority	21,066	60.24	+3.74			

Electorate (as at 11 November 2011): 46,983

=== 2008 election ===
2008 general election: Helensville
Notes:	Blue background denotes the winner of the electorate vote. Pink background denotes a candidate elected from their party list. Yellow background denotes an electorate win by a list member, or other incumbent. A ✓ or ✗ denotes status of any incumbent, win or lose respectively.						
Party	Candidate	Votes	%	±%	Party votes	%	±%
National	✓ John Key	26,771	73.61	+9.51	23,559	63.69	+8.60
Labour	Darien Fenton	6,224	17.11	−9.77	6,826	18.45	−9.52
Green	David Clendon	2,166	5.96	+5.79	1,814	4.90	+0.87
ACT	David Garrett	811	2.23	+1.10	2,481	6.71	+4.36
United Future	Angela Lovelock	309	0.85	−0.82	289	0.78	−1.69
Libertarianz	Peter Osborne	89	0.24		21	0.06	+0.01
NZ First					940	2.54	−3.34
Progressive					195	0.53	−0.28
Family Party					182	0.49	
Māori Party					182	0.49	+0.08
Bill and Ben					170	0.46	
Legalise Cannabis					131	0.35	+0.16
Kiwi					105	0.28	
Pacific					45	0.12	
Alliance					19	0.05	+0.02
Workers Party					9	0.02	
Democrats					8	0.02	±0.00
RAM					8	0.02	
RONZ					4	0.01	±0.00
Informal votes		251			110		
Total valid votes		36,370			36,988		
Turnout		37,298	82.27	−0.58			
National hold	Majority	20,547	56.49				

=== 2005 election ===
2005 general election: Helensville
Notes:	Blue background denotes the winner of the electorate vote. Pink background denotes a candidate elected from their party list. Yellow background denotes an electorate win by a list member, or other incumbent. A ✓ or ✗ denotes status of any incumbent, win or lose respectively.						
Party	Candidate	Votes	%	±%	Party votes	%	±%
National	✓ John Key	22,008	64.10	+29.92	19,224	55.09	+29.28
Labour	Judy Lawley	9,230	26.88	−0.24	9,761	27.97	−2.86
NZ First	Dail Jones	1,400	4.08	−5.45	2,051	5.88	−6.06
United Future	Andrea Deeth	573	1.67	−2.47	863	2.47	−5.82
ACT	Stephen Langford-Tebby	389	1.13		821	2.35	−10.26
Māori Party	Awa Hudson	359	1.05		142	0.41	
Progressive	Julian Aaron	318	0.93	−0.02	218	0.81	−0.08
Direct Democracy	Helen Koster	58	0.17		11	0.03	
Green					1,407	4.03	−1.99
Destiny					151	0.43	
Legalise Cannabis					66	0.19	−0.21
Christian Heritage					48	0.14	−0.85
Libertarianz					16	0.05	
Alliance					9	0.03	−1.00
Democrats					8	0.02	
Family Rights					8	0.02	
99 MP					5	0.01	
RONZ					5	0.01	
One NZ					4	0.01	−0.04
Informal votes		253			110		
Total valid votes		34,335			34,896		
Turnout		35,222	82.85	+3.21			
National hold	Majority	12,778	37.22	+31.26			

=== 2002 election ===
2002 general election: Helensville
Notes:	Blue background denotes the winner of the electorate vote. Pink background denotes a candidate elected from their party list. Yellow background denotes an electorate win by a list member, or other incumbent. A ✓ or ✗ denotes status of any incumbent, win or lose respectively.						
Party	Candidate	Votes	%	±%	Party votes	%	±%
National	John Key	9,775	34.18		7,524	25.81	
Labour	Gary Russell	8,070	28.21		8,988	30.83	
Independent	Brian Neeson	5,644	19.73				
NZ First	Dail Jones	2,725	9.53		3,481	11.94	
United Future	Andrea Deeth	1,184	4.14		2,416	8.29	
Alliance	Helen MacKinlay	581	2.03		299	1.03	
Christian Heritage	David Simpkin	350	1.22		288	0.99	
Progressive	Clare Dickson	273	0.95		272	0.93	
ACT					3,676	12.61	
Green					1,755	6.02	
ORNZ					313	1.07	
Legalise Cannabis					118	0.40	
One NZ					15	0.05	
Mana Māori					10	0.03	
NMP					2	0.01	
Informal votes		327			78		
Total valid votes		28,602			29,157		
Turnout		29,428	79.64				
National win new seat	Majority	1,705	5.96				

=== 1981 election ===
1981 general election: Helensville
Party	Candidate	Votes	%	±%
National	Dail Jones	8,242	35.85	−4.58
Labour	Jack Elder	8,026	34.91	+0.71
Social Credit	David Howes	6,718	29.22	
Majority		216	0.93	−5.29
Turnout		22,986	89.05	+19.21
Registered electors		25,812		

=== 1978 election ===
1978 general election: Helensville
Party	Candidate	Votes	%	±%
National	Dail Jones	7,783	40.43	
Labour	Jack Elder	6,584	34.20	
Social Credit	Chris Lynch	4,510	23.43	
Values	Dennis Worley	370	1.92	
Majority		1,199	6.22	
Turnout		19,247	69.84	
Registered electors		27,558		
