= George Groombridge =

New Zealand politician (1928–2022)

George Groombridge QSM (9 February 1928 – 26 March 2022) was a New Zealand politician and social worker. He was president of the New Zealand First Party between 2006 and 2010.

Groombridge was a senior social worker from Masterton. He became vice-president of New Zealand First in 2004 and subsequently replaced Dail Jones as president in 2006. He stepped down from the role in 2010. He was the New Zealand First candidate for Wairarapa at the 1996 general election. In the 1983 New Year Honours, Groombridge was awarded the Queen's Service Medal for community service.

Groombridge died in Masterton on 26 March 2022, at the age of 94.

Party political offices
Preceded by Dail Jones	President of New Zealand First; 2006–2010	Succeeded by Kevin Gardener
