= Katherine Rich =

New Zealand politician (born 1967)

Member of the New Zealand Parliament for National list
- In office 27 November 1999 – 8 November 2008

Personal details
- Born: 16 December 1967 (age 58) Australia
- Party: National

Katherine Rich (née Allison, born 16 December 1967) served as a member of the New Zealand House of Representatives for the National Party from 1999 to 2008. She was chief executive of the New Zealand Food & Grocery Council, an industry lobby group, from 2009 to 2022, and in 2024 she was appointed chief executive of BusinessNZ.

== Early life and family ==
Rich was born in Australia on 16 December 1967, the daughter of agricultural scientist Jock Allison, and moved to New Zealand in 1969. She was educated at St Hilda's Collegiate School in Dunedin from 1980 to 1985, and studied at the University of Otago, from where she graduated with a Bachelor of Commerce in 1990 and a Bachelor of Arts in 1993. When she voted for the first time, in the 1987 election, she gave her vote to her uncle, the Labour MP Clive Matthewson.

After leaving university she held a number of management and analytical roles in both the public and private sectors. She is married to former Otago and Highlanders rugby player Andy Rich, with whom she has four children. Her jobs were:

- Project analyst for the Ministry of Agriculture in Palmerston North
- Project analyst for the Foundation for Research, Science and Technology in Wellington
- Marketing manager for the knitting yarns division of Alliance Textiles
- General manager of Silverstream Ltd in Dunedin

== Political career ==
=== Member of Parliament ===
New Zealand Parliament
Years	Term	Electorate	List	Party
1999–2002	46th	List	23	National
2002–2005	47th	List	14	National
2005–2008	48th	List	10	National

Rich entered Parliament in 1999 as a list MP for the National Party. At this election, Rich was ranked twenty-third on the National list, a very high placing for someone not already in Parliament. She had contested the Dunedin North electorate, but finished second behind incumbent Labour MP Pete Hodgson. However, even though National lost government, her ranking on the party list was high enough for her to enter Parliament.

Once in Parliament, Rich rose quickly through the National Party hierarchy, and eventually was ranked fourth in the party caucus. At various times she served as her Party's spokesperson for employment, broadcasting, economic development, state-owned enterprises, and culture. In January 2005, however, she refused to give full support to the "tough-on-welfare" Orewa Speech by then-party leader Don Brash, who demoted her to tenth place and dismissed her as social welfare spokesperson and gave the portfolio to Judith Collins. Following the resignation of Don Brash as National Party leader on 27 November 2006, the incoming Leader of the Opposition, John Key, elevated Rich to eighth place within the National caucus and shadow Cabinet. She was appointed, on 1 December 2006, the party's spokesperson on education. Some notable achievements included co-presenting to Parliament a petition for a Royal Commission of Inquiry into the Peter Ellis case (2003); exposing a huge rise in the number of unallocated cases of physically and sexually abused children (2005); highlighting Labour Government inaction over understaffed PlunketLine (2005); leading National's support for a bill to allow mothers in prison to keep their babies with them until they turn two (2006); revealing irresponsible government spending, including the hip-hop tour spending debacle (2004). She was also the only National MP prepared to cross the floor and vote for the 'anti-smacking bill' in 2007 prior to the compromise clause 4 being added.

In 2002, Rich was the second woman MP (after Ruth Richardson) to take her baby to parliament and breastfeed there.

For both the 2002 and 2005 general elections, Rich stood unsuccessfully in the Dunedin North electorate, but was returned as a list MP. She announced, on 13 February 2008, that she would not stand in the 2008 general election, saying that she wanted to spend more time with her children. She was replaced as National candidate for Dunedin North by Michael Woodhouse.

=== Political views ===
Rich, who has described her own position as "centrist" and "centre right", had a reputation as one of the more liberal members of the National Party. She was the inaugural parliamentary co-chair of the party's internal Classical Liberal Policy Advisory Group, which advocates policies that are both economically and socially liberal.

National MP Nikki Kaye, herself known for what has been described as "socially liberal" views, has cited her as a role model.

== Career after Parliament ==
Rich took up the position of Chief Executive of the New Zealand Food & Grocery Council in March 2009, following appointment in November 2008. The Council represents grocery manufacturers and suppliers.

She was appointed to the board of the Health Promotion Agency in June 2012. Prime Minister John Key of the National Party said she would be able to manage conflicts of interest with her role with the Food & Grocery Council.

She has been on the National Advisory Council for the Employment of Women since 2016, and has been on the board of children's charity Barnardos NZ since 2014. In 2013, she was appointed to the APEC Business Advisory Council, and stepped down in 2019.

=== Dirty Politics controversy ===
Emails leaked to political writer Nicky Hager implied that Rich, in her role as Chief Executive of the Food & Grocery Council, and while on the board of the Health Promotion Agency (a Crown entity), had given prominent blogger Cameron Slater information that rebutted comments made by academics. These allegations were denied by Rich. HPA chair Lee Mathias said she believed any potential conflicts of interest with Rich's dual roles had been managed in terms of the State Services Commission's guidelines. "She's been a very strong supporter of every decision made by this agency." A subsequent review of Rich's role by the Auditor-General found no conflict of interest and Rich said she felt vindicated by the Auditor-General's declaration. She said "I'm pleased with the result, which vindicates my position. Accusations that I had broken the law and not declared interests were disappointing, wrong and defamatory."

On 3 March 2021, the New Zealand news site Newsroom reported Rich and the Food and Grocery Council had made a confidential settlement with academics Boyd Swinburn, Doug Sellman and Shane Bradbrook after they sued for defamation. The plaintiff's lawyers told the judge in the case that Rich was keen to keep the settlement confidential. The PR firm of Carrick Graham, another defendant, had received $365,619 from the Food and Grocery Council between November 2009 and July 2016. Rich said the Food and Grocery Council "did not pay anyone to write any stories on its behalf on Whale Oil, or any other publication". Nor was it otherwise involved in any such stories. She told NZ Listener that Bradbrook, whose complaints comprised nearly half of the trio's action, earlier conceded his case and was ordered to pay "considerable" costs. She also said the [plaintiffs failed to prove one of their most serious allegations – that she and the Food and Grocery Council planted objectionable material blackguarding them on the Whale Oil blog.
