= Doug Woolerton =

New Zealand politician

1st President of New Zealand First
- In office 1993–2005
- Leader: Winston Peters
- Succeeded by: Dail Jones

Member of the New Zealand Parliament for New Zealand First list
- In office 1996–2008

Personal details
- Born: 17 May 1944 (age 82)
- Party: New Zealand National Party (1990–92); New Zealand First (1992–)

Doug Woolerton (born 17 May 1944) is a New Zealand politician who has been a member of the New Zealand First party since it was founded, and the National Party for a few years before that.

== Early years ==
He was educated at Hamilton Boys' High School, and has a background in agriculture, having been a farmer for twenty-one years and director of a milk company for nine.

== Political career ==
Woolerton was originally a member of the National Party. He stood for selection as the National candidate for the seat of Hamilton West in 1990, but lost to Grant Thomas, who was later elected to the seat. Woolerton left the National Party in 1992 to form the New Zealand First party with Winston Peters.

=== Member of parliament ===
New Zealand Parliament
Years	Term	Electorate	List	Party
1996–1999	45th	List	8	NZ First
1999–2002	46th	List	5	NZ First
2002–2005	47th	List	5	NZ First
2005–2008	48th	List	5	NZ First

Woolerton first entered Parliament in the 1996 election, becoming a list MP after being ranked fifth on the New Zealand First party list. He remained an MP until his party lost all parliamentary seats in the 2008 general election.

He was the president of New Zealand First from the party's inception until 2005 when he resigned in protest against Winston Peters taking a visible role in the Labour-led government as Minister of Foreign Affairs. Later there were frictions between then New Zealand First president Dail Jones on the one hand, and Woolerton and Brian Donnelly on the other, over the latter's support for Sue Bradford's private members bill to outlaw parental corporal punishment of children (or smacking).

Party political offices
New political party	President of New Zealand First; 1993–2005	Succeeded by Dail Jones
