= Dave Hereora =

New Zealand politician (1956–2014)

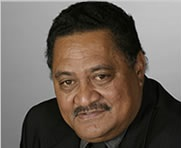

Member of the New Zealand Parliament for Labour Party List
- In office 27 July 2002 – 8 November 2008

Personal details
- Born: David Murray Hereora; 9 August 1956
- Died: 5 August 2014 (aged 57)
- Party: Labour
- Spouse: Faith Hereora
- Occupation: Politician; Union organiser

David Murray Hereora (9 August 1956 – 5 August 2014) was a New Zealand trade unionist and politician. He was a list MP for the Labour Party from 2002 to 2008.

== Early life ==
Hereora was born in 1956. He was a worker at Affco Meatworks and became a trade union organiser.

== Political career ==
New Zealand Parliament
Years	Term	Electorate	List	Party
2002–05	47th	List	38	Labour
2005–08	48th	List	39	Labour

Hereora was first elected to Parliament in the 2002 election, standing against National's Judith Collins in Clevedon but nevertheless entering parliament as a list MP. He was Māori vice-president of the Labour Party. Hereroa served until 2008 as Chair of the Māori Affairs Select Committee.

In 2008, Judith Collins won the Papakura electorate. After leaving Parliament Hereora returned to union organising, working with the Service & Food Workers Union in mediation talks at the Papakura Griffin Foods manufacturing plant.

He died on 5 August 2014. Labour leader David Cunliffe paid tribute, saying that Hereora "dedicated his life to the fight for low income workers."
