= Lesley Soper =

New Zealand politician (born 1954)

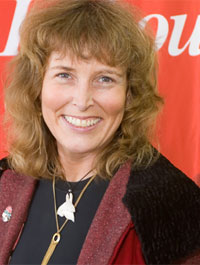
- Soper in 2008

Member of the New Zealand Parliament for Labour party list
- In office 4 April 2005 – 17 September 2005
- Preceded by: Jonathan Hunt (Note: Normally, list MPs do not have individual predecessors or successors, but Soper succeeded Hunt and then Beyer following their resignations during sitting parliaments.)
- In office 19 February 2007 – 8 November 2008
- Preceded by: Georgina Beyer

Personal details
- Born: 5 November 1954 (age 71) Invercargill, New Zealand
- Party: Labour

Lesley Frances Soper (born 5 November 1954) is a former New Zealand politician of the Labour Party.

== Political career ==
New Zealand Parliament
Years	Term	Electorate	List	Party
2005	47th	List	43	Labour
2007–2008	48th	List	45	Labour

She was a Labour Party list member of Parliament for several months in 2005, replacing Jonathan Hunt, and she returned to Parliament in 2007 to fill the vacancy caused by Georgina Beyer's resignation.

Soper first stood for Parliament in 1993. She stood in the Wallace electorate, coming runner-up to National's Bill English. She then proceeded to contest the Clutha-Southland seat since it was created in the 1996 election, again placing second to English on each occasion. Soper was ranked 43rd on Labour's party list in the 2002 election. While initially missing out on entering parliament, she was able to enter Parliament upon the retirement of Jonathan Hunt, being declared elected on 4 April 2005 and sworn in the following day. In the 2005 election, Soper had hoped to contest the Invercargill seat, but was defeated in the nomination process by Wayne Harpur. Her position on the 2005 list was forty-fifth, and she did not return to parliament until 2007.

Soper stood in the Invercargill electorate in the 2008, 2011, and 2014 elections, twice beaten by National's Eric Roy and then by Sarah Dowie. After her 2014 defeat, Soper declared that she would not stand again. She contested and won a seat on the Invercargill City Council in 2016.

Soper is retiring from the council at the 2025 local elections after serving for three terms.

== Other activities ==
In addition to serving as Women's Vice President of the Labour Party, Soper has worked for the Council of Trade Unions and the New Zealand Educational Institute. She has also served on the Southland District Health Board.
