= West Auckland (electorate) =

West Auckland is a former New Zealand parliamentary electorate on the western outskirts of Auckland, created for the 1984 election from part of the former Helensville electorate. The electorate was abolished for the 1993 election, and split between Henderson and Waitakere electorates.

== Population centres ==
The 1981 census had shown that the North Island had experienced further population growth, and three additional general seats were created through the 1983 electoral redistribution, bringing the total number of electorates to 95. The South Island had, for the first time, experienced a population loss, but its number of general electorates was fixed at 25 since the 1967 electoral redistribution. More of the South Island population was moving to Christchurch, and two electorates were abolished, while two electorates were recreated. In the North Island, six electorates were newly created (including West Auckland), three electorates were recreated, and six electorates were abolished.

In 1984 the electorate included Kumeū, Hobsonville, Henderson, Rānui and Waitakere; much of the area had previously been in the southern part of the Helensville electorate. In 1987 it was moved to the south, losing Hobsonville and much of Kumeū while gaining Titirangi and Piha.

== History ==
Jack Elder of the Labour Party was elected in 1984 as West Auckland electorate's representative; he had in the previous two elections stood unsuccessfully in the Helensville electorate. When the West Auckland electorate was abolished in 1993, Elder successfully stood in the Henderson electorate.

=== Members of Parliament ===
Key

Labour

Election	Winner
1984 election	Jack Elder
1987 election	Jack Elder
1990 election	Jack Elder
Electorate abolished in 1993 (see Henderson)

== Election results ==
=== 1990 election ===
1990 general election: West Auckland
Party	Candidate	Votes	%	±%
Labour	Jack Elder	6,949	39.35	−8.00
National	Laurie Wicks	6,697	37.92	
Green	Carolynne Anne Stone	1,821	10.31	
NewLabour	Paul Whinray	980	5.54	
Independent	Tim Shadbolt	541	3.06	
Independent National	Pat Fallon	311	1.76	
Democrats	Rodney Wilson	223	1.26	
McGillicuddy Serious	John Errol Way	89	0.50	
Independent	John David Howard	48	0.27	
Majority		252	1.42	−12.90
Turnout		17,659	80.44	−3.72
Registered electors		21,952		

=== 1987 election ===
1987 general election: West Auckland
Party	Candidate	Votes	%	±%
Labour	Jack Elder	9,404	47.35	+0.99
National	Ben Couch	6,560	33.03	
Democrats	Clark James	590	2.97	
NZ Party	Gray Philips	101	0.50	
Independent	R R Wahrlrich	59	0.29	
Majority		2,844	14.32	+3.93
Turnout		16,714	84.16	−8.10
Registered electors		19,858		

=== 1984 election ===
1984 general election: West Auckland
Party	Candidate	Votes	%	±%
Labour	Jack Elder	10,369	48.34	
National	Dail Jones	8,140	37.95	
NZ Party	Ashok Patel	1,901	8.86	
Social Credit	Mike Webber	965	4.49	
Independent	S I Clews	52	0.24	
Mana Motuhake	N Te Hira	21	0.09	
Majority		2,229	10.39	
Turnout		21,448	92.26	
Registered electors		23,247		
