= Lynne Pillay =

New Zealand politician

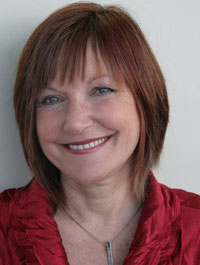

Member of the New Zealand Parliament for Waitakere
- In office 27 July 2002 – 8 November 2008
- Preceded by: Brian Neeson
- Succeeded by: Paula Bennett

Member of the New Zealand Parliament for Labour party list
- In office 8 November 2008 – 26 November 2011

Personal details
- Born: 14 August 1950 (age 76) Palmerston North, New Zealand
- Party: Labour
- Occupation: Nurse

Barbara Lynne Pillay (born 14 August 1950) is a New Zealand politician, and member of the Labour Party.

Pillay was born in Palmerston North. Before entering politics, she was a nurse, and had been active in the New Zealand Nurses Union.

== Member of Parliament ==
New Zealand Parliament
| Years | Term | Electorate | List | Party |
|---|---|---|---|---|
| 2002–2005 | 47th | Waitakere | 39 | Labour |
| 2005–2008 | 48th | Waitakere | 40 | Labour |
| 2008–2011 | 49th | List | 32 | Labour |

She was first elected to Parliament in the 2002 election, winning the Waitakere electorate. Her main rival was Alliance leader Laila Harré. Pillay had previously contested the safe National seat of Tamaki in the 1999 election, and had missed out on election as a list MP by only one place.

In 2006, Pillay's Human Rights (Women in Armed Forces) Amendment Bill was drawn from the member's ballot. The bill removed the legislative ban on women serving in combat roles in the New Zealand Defence Force. The bill was subsequently adopted by the government before its third reading, and passed unanimously as the Human Rights (Women in Armed Forces) Amendment Act 2007.

In the 2008 general election Pillay was defeated by National candidate Paula Bennett, with a margin of 632 votes. Pillay was ranked 32 on the Labour Party list and was elected into the 49th parliament as a list MP.

On 3 December 2009 Pillay announced that she would retire at the 2011 election.

In 2025, Pillay was one of 10 women MPs from across the political spectrum to serve on the People's Select Committee, a committee organised by former National MP Marilyn Waring to take submissions on pay equity changes made by the Sixth National Government of New Zealand.

New Zealand Parliament
| Preceded by Brian Neeson | Member of Parliament for Waitakere; 2002–2008 | Succeeded by Paula Bennett |
