= Brian Connell =

New Zealand politician

Brian David Connell (born 23 April 1956) is a former New Zealand politician who represented the New Zealand National Party in the New Zealand Parliament from 2002 to 2008.

== Biography ==
New Zealand Parliament
Years	Term	Electorate		Party
2002–2005	47th	Rakaia	n/a	National
2005–2008	48th	Rakaia	25	National

Born in Foxton in the Manawatū region, Connell studied history and geography at Massey University. He also gained a diploma in teaching. He worked as a primary school teacher for a time, then as a secondary school teacher, before moving to Australia, where he became a manager at a banking company in Victoria. After holding a number of management and consultancy positions, he returned to New Zealand and took up farming.

The voters of the Rakaia electorate elected Connell to Parliament in the 2002 election, replacing the retiring former Prime Minister Jenny Shipley as the National Party candidate. Connell served on the Law and Order and Commerce select committees.

Following Connell's re-election in the 2005 election, National Party leader Don Brash ranked him 27th in the National party caucus of 48 MPs giving him the portfolios of forestry, commerce, consumer affairs and statistics. Although this gave Connell a higher position (he was previously unranked), Connell objected to such a lowly ranking, saying "I would have liked bigger portfolios and a higher ranking based on my ability, rather than the leader slapping me around because I'm outspoken" and describing it as a "big rat to swallow". Don Brash responded by removing his portfolios and rank in the caucus, saying Connell no longer had his confidence. On 4 November 2005, Connell threatened to become an independent MP.

On 13 September 2006 TV3 News and The New Zealand Herald reported that Connell had confronted Brash during a National Party caucus meeting with allegations of an extramarital affair. Brash issued a statement later that same day, declaring plans to take leave in order to sort out marital difficulties with his wife.

The National Party caucus suspended Connell on 26 September 2006. A statement released by the National Party said that Connell had failed to show the restraint and discipline expected of a caucus member, and that it had no confidence in him.

Connell reportedly declared that he planned to grow his hair as a protest until the National Party changed its leader: he later denied this.

Having already announced his intention to retire at the 2008 election, Connell retired from Parliament on 31 August 2008 to take up a job in Brisbane.
