= Moana Mackey =

New Zealand politician

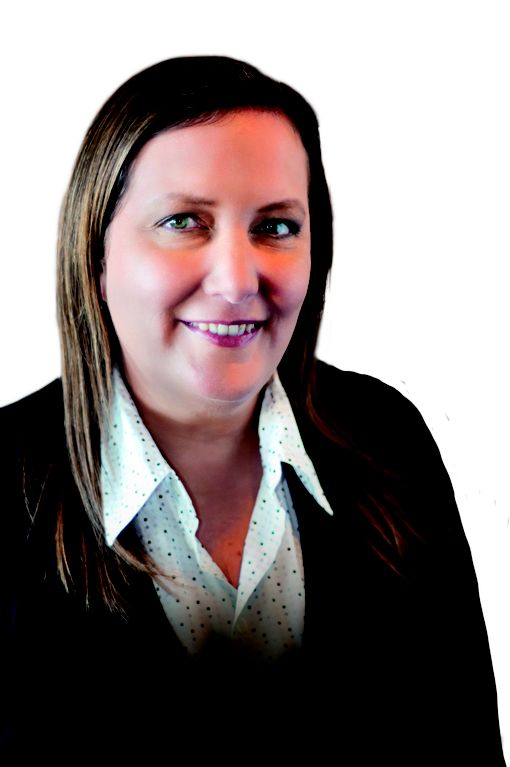
- Mackey in 2011

Member of the New Zealand Parliament for Labour party list
- In office 29 July 2003 – 21 September 2014
- Preceded by: Graham Kelly (Note: Normally, list MPs do not have individual predecessors or successors, but Kelly resigned during a sitting parliament and therefore was succeeded by Mackey.)

Personal details
- Born: 28 February 1974 (age 52) Auckland, New Zealand
- Party: Labour
- Relations: Janet Mackey (mother)
- Residences: Gisborne

Moana Lynore Mackey (born 28 February 1974) is a New Zealand politician and has represented the New Zealand Labour Party in the New Zealand Parliament from 2003 until 2014. She has Māori, Irish, Scottish and Spanish ancestry.

== Early life and career ==
Born in Auckland, New Zealand, and raised in Gisborne, Mackey attended Mangapapa Primary School, Ilminster Intermediate and Lytton High School. While in high school, Mackey would participate in Young Labour, the New Zealand Youth Orchestra and Youth Parliament. After leaving high school, she attended Victoria University of Wellington from 1993, graduating with a degree in biochemistry and molecular biology. Remaining in the Wellington area, she worked as a scientist, leading a team at an environmental laboratory in Lower Hutt and from 2001 to 2004 was a member of the Petone Community Board.

From 1999 to 2000, Moana Mackey served as President of Young Labour. She also worked in the Trade Union movement.

== Member of Parliament ==
New Zealand Parliament
Years	Term	Electorate	List	Party
2003–2005	47th	List	41	Labour
2005–2008	48th	List	41	Labour
2008–2011	49th	List	25	Labour
2011–2014	50th	List	19	Labour

Mackey entered Parliament on 29 July 2003 through the Labour party list after Graham Kelly vacated his list seat. Her mother, Janet Mackey, also sat as a Labour MP until 2005 – the two formed the first mother-daughter pair in New Zealand parliamentary history. In the election that year, Janet Mackey retired from politics, and Moana Mackey contested but lost the East Coast electorate seat (formerly held by her mother) to National Party candidate, Anne Tolley by 1,219 votes. However, she returned to Parliament as a List MP. Mackey unsuccessfully contested East Coast again in the 2008 general election, losing to Tolley by 6,413 votes. Mackey again returned to Parliament as a list MP for the Labour Party.

Mackey was not placed high enough on Labour's list to return to Parliament following the 2014 election to be allocated a seat following a drop in support for Labour. In February 2017, Labour list MP Jacinda Ardern won the 2017 Mount Albert by-election, which allowed the party to bring a new list MP to parliament. Mackey was the second-highest ranked Labour candidate not to enter parliament at the 2014 election. The person higher, Maryan Street, announced she would decline the chance to return to Parliament. Mackey likewise declined the option to re-enter Parliament.

== Post politics ==
Since 2015 Mackey has been employed in several advisory roles in Wellington City Council's city planning team.
