= Russell Fairbrother =

New Zealand politician

Russell Fairbrother KC
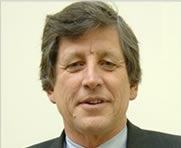

Member of the New Zealand Parliament for Napier
- In office 27 July 2002 – 5 October 2005
- Preceded by: Geoff Braybrooke
- Succeeded by: Chris Tremain

Personal details
- Born: Carterton, New Zealand
- Party: Labour
- Profession: lawyer

Elwin Russell Fairbrother KC is a lawyer and former New Zealand politician. He was a Labour Party Member of Parliament from 2002 to 2008.

== Early years ==
Fairbrother, who is commonly known by his middle name, was born into a truck driving family and raised in the Wairarapa town of Carterton.

Before entering politics, Fairbrother was a lawyer for twenty-three years, having obtained an LLB from Victoria University of Wellington. At Victoria, he was a member of the Victoria University of Wellington Debating Society. In 1969 he won the Plunket Medal for Oratory and in 1971 he won the Joynt Scroll for inter university debating. He debated for NZ Universities against a touring Australian University team. He served as president of the Wellington Speaking Union.

He was also president of the Napier branch of Grey Power, a lobby group for the elderly and a past president and then patron of HB Prisoners Aid and Rehabilitation Society.

As a lawyer, he has led the defence in over 100 murder trials and has appeared before the Privy Council in London. In 1994 he successfully defended a murder accused in what has come to be regarded as the world's first Post Traumatic Stress Disorder defence; this case has since formed the basis of a novel by celebrated author Sir James McNeish – "The Crime of Huey Dunstan" published in 2010.

== Member of Parliament ==
New Zealand Parliament
Years	Term	Electorate	List	Party
2002–2005	47th	Napier	none	Labour
2005–2008	48th	List	38	Labour

Fairbrother was first elected to Parliament in the 2002 election, replacing long-serving Labour MP Geoff Braybrooke in the Napier seat. In the 2005 general election he was defeated by National's Chris Tremain but was elected as a list MP.

In his first term he was elected chair of the special select committee of the House of Parliament created to examine and report on the Maori Fisheries Act 2004, the Foreshore and Seabed Act 2004 and the Guardians of Fiordland legislation. He was also one of three government appointments to the special select committee set up to report to Parliament on New Zealand's constitutional arrangements. He was also elected chair of the Labour back bench committee and appointed Parliamentary Private Secretary to the Attorney General.

In his second term he was elected chair of the special sub-committee established to examine and report on the Evidence Act 2006. He was selected by the Prime Minister to travel to and observe East Timor's first domestic democratic election.

After defeating Stuart Nash in a battle to stand in the Napier electorate for Labour, Fairbrother did not stand on Labour's list in the 2008 election. He was unable to win the electorate off Chris Tremain in the 2008 election and, since he was not successful in regaining his seat, he was not returned to parliament.

== After politics ==
After leaving Parliament, Fairbrother returned to the law. He also represented actor Chris Comesky. He successfully secured acquittals in the high-profile murder cases of Zion King, and Wilson Apatu, who had shot a man four times in front of his family, killing him, before carjacking a couple at knifepoint. He was the defence lawyer for ex-Dunedin dean Jonathan Kirkpatrick after his NZ$600,000 fraud at the Auckland University of Technology.

New Zealand Parliament
Preceded by Geoff Braybrooke	Member of Parliament for Napier; 2002–2005	Succeeded by Chris Tremain
