= Barbara Stewart (politician) =

New Zealand politician (1952–2024)

Member of the New Zealand Parliament for New Zealand First party list
- In office 27 July 2002 – 8 November 2008
- In office 26 November 2011 – 23 September 2017

Personal details
- Born: 23 February 1952 Wairoa, New Zealand
- Died: 2 June 2024 (aged 72)
- Party: New Zealand First
- Spouse: Gordon Stewart
- Children: One
- Profession: Teacher

Barbara Joy Stewart (23 February 1952 – 2 June 2024) was a New Zealand politician. She was a Member of Parliament for the New Zealand First party from 2002 to 2008 and again from 2011 to 2017.

== Early life and family ==
Stewart was born in Wairoa on 23 February 1952. Her father was an electrical engineer, and she had four siblings. With her husband, Gordon, she has a son, Alister. Gordon died in 2017 from cancer.

She obtained a BEd and a Postgraduate Diploma in Management Studies, both from the University of Waikato. Before entering politics, she was a primary and secondary school teacher and a company training officer.

Stewart was initially a "long-time" member of the National Party and acted as secretary for the Feilding branch 1987–90. She joined New Zealand First in 1996. Prior to and during her political career, she lived in Cambridge.

== Member of Parliament ==
=== First period, 2002–2008 ===
New Zealand Parliament
Years	Term	Electorate	List	Party
2002–2005	47th	List	6	NZ First
2005–2008	48th	List	6	NZ First
2011–2014	50th	List	5	NZ First
2014–2017	51st	List	5	NZ First

Stewart contested the North Shore electorate for New Zealand First in the 2002 election and was ranked sixth on the party list—the highest rank of any candidate who was not already an MP and also the highest ranked woman. Although she lost North Shore, she was elected to Parliament as a list MP. She began her first term as New Zealand First's representative on the Social Services committee but eventually moved to the Health committee. She was also the party spokesperson for consumer affairs, family affairs (encompassing the women's affairs, senior citizens, and disability issues portfolios), health, social services, and tourism.

In her September 2002 maiden statement to the house, she set out her intention to be an advocate for children. She described an "absence of parenting skills" in society and set out her concerns relating to child health, including childhood obesity and poor dental health. She also spoke out against violence on television and in video games.

Stewart was re-elected on the New Zealand First party list in the 2005 general election, having lost in Piako. After the election, New Zealand First supported the continuation of the Labour government.

In 2006, Stewart's private member's bill, the Electoral (Reduction in Number of Members of Parliament) Amendment Bill, was introduced to Parliament. The bill followed the 1999 New Zealand MP reduction referendum, in which 81.46% of participating electors voted to reduce the number of MPs to 99. The referendum was non-binding and the referendum outcome had not been implemented by the government. At the time, New Zealand's mixed-member proportional voting system provided for 69 electorate MPs and at least 51 list MPs for a total of at least 120 MPs (subject to any overhang). Stewart's bill proposed no changes to the number of electorate MPs and proposed to cut the number of list MPs by 20 for a total of 100 MPs. At its first reading on 16 March 2006, the Bill passed 61 votes to 60 despite the governing Labour Party's opposition, but it was defeated at its second reading on 8 November 2006 when the National Party withdrew its support.

In the 2008 general election, Stewart unsuccessfully contested the new Waikato electorate. She was promoted to fifth on the New Zealand First list, but the party lost all its parliamentary seats, winning no electorates and polling below the 5% threshold.

=== Second period, 2011–2017 ===
At the 2011 election Stewart was re-elected to Parliament following a resurgence in the New Zealand First vote, where she had been ranked fifth on the party list. Stewart had stood again in the Waikato seat but was unsuccessful in defeating Lindsay Tisch, the incumbent National Party of New Zealand MP. Stewart was elected whip by the new NZ First caucus following the 2011 election and remained in this role following her re-election in 2014.

In her second period in Parliament, Stewart was New Zealand First's spokesperson on ACC, disability issues, family issues, health, labour and industrial relations, and tourism, and associate spokesperson for senior citizens. She also rejoined the Health select committee. She criticised the National government's record on suicide prevention and immigration, saying that Asian immigrants to New Zealand "struggl[e] with the concept of a house."

In 2013, Stewart voted against the Marriage Amendment Bill, which aims to permit same sex marriage in New Zealand, with all of her fellow New Zealand First MPs.

Stewart was successful in having two health-related private member's bills selected for introduction during her second period in Parliament, though neither passed. The SuperGold Health Check Bill, was selected for introduction in November 2013. The bill proposed that over 65s who receive New Zealand superannuation would be eligible for three free doctors' visits per year. The Bill was transferred into the name of New Zealand First leader Winston Peters before its first reading, where it was defeated 60 votes to 61.

The Affordable Healthcare Bill was drawn in August 2015 and was also transferred to Peters. It failed its first reading 46 votes to 75 that December. The bill proposed amendments to the Immigration Act 2009, the Income Tax Act 2007 and the Social Security Act 1964 that would require immigrant parents to have and maintain health insurance, remove fringe benefits tax from health insurance and give a rebate on health insurance to pensioners. The policies related to mandatory health insurance for immigrants were controversial. A similar policy proposal had been criticised by Stewart's New Zealand First colleagues Denis O'Rourke and Mahesh Bindra, who questioned its consistency with the New Zealand Bill of Rights Act 1990. Later, Attorney-General, Chris Finlayson, issued a legal opinion stating that the bill's provisions related to mandatory health insurance for immigrants would unjustifiably limit the right to freedom from discrimination in the Bill of Rights.

Stewart announced that, following the death of her husband on 31 January 2017, she would not stand for re-election in the 2017 general election. In her valedictory statement on 8 August 2017, she stated that she considered her greatest achievement to be working with Labour's health minister Pete Hodgson on providing free doctors' visits for children under six. Hodgson announced that policy in August 2007, thanking New Zealand First MPs for their support.

== Later life and death ==
Stewart indicated that she would contribute to the voluntary sector during her retirement. She was appointed a Trust Waikato trustee. Stewart died on 2 June 2024, at the age of 72.
