= 99 MP Party =

New Zealand political party

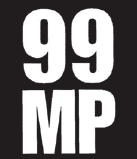
- Founded: 2005
- Dissolved: 2006

The 99 MP Party was a small New Zealand political party that contested the 2005 general election. It supported a reduction of the number of Members of Parliament from 120 to 99.

== History ==
With the introduction of Mixed Member Proportional in 1996, the number of MPs rose from 99 to 120. Margaret Robertson organised a referendum in 1999 calling for the number to be reduced back to 99.

Local businessman Jack Yan proposed that Robertson's campaign be turned into a political party in 2001, a decision that she agreed to the following year after finding that most parties in Parliament generally did not support a reduction. Robertson took initial steps toward achieving the membership number required. Yan initially served as president and designed the logo and marketing collateral, but lived in Europe in the northern summer of 2002, became less involved on his return, and was replaced.

The 2002 policies were centrist to conservative, including the toughening of the Crimes Act 1961 and reforming Parliament and the select committee structure. In addition to the reduction of MP numbers, the party also supports making referendums mandatory for all constitutional changes.

The Electoral Commission accepted the party's official registration on 14 April 2005. It put forward a party list of two people: Robertson and Ramasmy Ramanathan.

== 2005 General Election and subsequent deregistration ==
In the 2005 elections, the 99 MP Party received 601 party votes, or 0.03%, and did not win any electorate seats, so did not enter parliament. Shortly afterwards, Margaret Robertson announced plans to step down.

In February 2006, New Zealand First MP Barbara Stewart introduced a private member's bill that would cut the number of MPs to 100. It passed its first reading, though the Maori Party indicated their support was so that the bill could go to select committee, at which public submissions could be heard. The select committee recommended against changing the number of MPs. The bill was defeated at its second reading on 8 November 2006.

In September 2006, the party was deregistered, having failed to provide evidence of the necessary 500 members. As of 2026, the size of parliament remains at least 120.
