= Pita Paraone =

New Zealand politician (1945–2019)

Pita Paraone MNZM
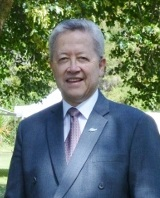

Member of the New Zealand Parliament for New Zealand First party list
- In office 22 July 2002 – 8 November 2008
- In office 21 September 2014 – 23 September 2017

Personal details
- Born: Rewiti Pomare Kingi Paraone; 30 November 1945 Kawakawa, New Zealand
- Died: 26 August 2019 (aged 73) Auckland, New Zealand
- Party: New Zealand First
- Relations: Elva Joyce Moore (m. 1966)
- Children: 3

Rewiti Pomare Kingi "Pita" Paraone MNZM (30 November 1945 – 26 August 2019) was a New Zealand politician and chairman of the Waitangi National Trust Board. He was a member of the New Zealand First party.

== Early life and family ==
Paraone was born at Kawakawa on 30 November 1945, the son of Kathleen and Tamati Paraone. He received his education at Motatau District High School and Bay of Islands College. He earned a Diploma in Business Development at the University of Auckland, and a Diploma in Social Work at Victoria University of Wellington. He also attended the Henley Management College in Henley-on-Thames, England.

In 1966, Paraone married Elva Joyce Moore, and the couple went on to have three children.

Before entering politics, Paraone had a long career in public service spanning several decades. He was a regional director for Te Puni Kōkiri, the Ministry of Maori Development. In 1990, he was awarded the New Zealand 1990 Commemoration Medal, and in the 1997 New Year Honours, he was appointed a Member of the New Zealand Order of Merit, for services to Māori and the community. He lived in Pakuranga during his first period in parliament.

== Political career ==
New Zealand Parliament
Years	Term	Electorate	List	Party
2002–2005	47th	List	7	NZ First
2005–2008	48th	List	7	NZ First
2014–2017	51st	List	8	NZ First

Before entering parliament, Paraone was a board member of New Zealand First (1999–2000) and a member of the Board of Directors (2000–2002).

He stood in the 1999 election in the Pakuranga electorate but was unsuccessful. He was ranked 19th on the New Zealand First party list, which was too low to be elected from the list. He was first elected to Parliament as a list MP in the 2002 election. In the 2008 general election Paraone was sixth on the New Zealand First list, but the party lost all its parliamentary seats, winning no electorates and polling below the 5% threshold.

In December 2009 he was elected a Chairman of the Waitangi National Trust Board, replacing Jeremy Williams. Paraone has been on the board of the Waitangi National Trust since 1997.

In 2014, Paraone was re-elected as a New Zealand First list MP and was his party spokesperson on Māori Affairs, Treaty of Waitangi Issues, Pacific Island Affairs, and the Office of Treaty Settlements. At the 2017 election however, Paraone was ranked 11th on the New Zealand First list and was not returned to Parliament. Paraone publicly encouraged his party to support the formation of Sixth Labour Government of New Zealand. He was appointed chair of the Local Government Commission in November 2018 and held this appointment until his death.

== Death ==
Paraone died in Auckland on 26 August 2019. He had undergone cardiac surgery just three weeks prior, but had failed to recover. The incumbent Deputy Prime Minister of New Zealand and Minister of Foreign Affairs, Winston Peters, offered his condolences, stating that he was "deeply saddened" by the death.
