= Peter Brown (New Zealand politician) =

New Zealand politician

2nd Deputy Leader of the New Zealand First party
- In office 21 July 1998 – 14 February 2009
- Preceded by: Tau Henare
- Succeeded by: Tracey Martin

Member of the New Zealand Parliament for New Zealand First list
- In office 12 October 1996 – 8 November 2008

Personal details
- Born: 18 October 1939 (age 87) Andover, Hampshire, England
- Party: New Zealand First
- Other political affiliations: National Party (1984–93)
- Children: 2
- Occupation: Shipping consultant

Peter Brown (born 18 October 1939) is an English-born New Zealand politician. He was a member of parliament for and deputy leader of the New Zealand First party.

== Biography ==
=== Early life and career ===
Born in England in 1939, Brown was in the Merchant Navy and held the rank of Chief Officer and holds a sea captain's certificate. He left the navy after deciding to settle in New Zealand in 1964. He managed a stevedoring company and was president and chairman of the New Zealand Stevedoring Employers Association. He then operated his own business, Intercargo Management, doing consultancy work for cargo, shipping and port companies. His consultancy included advising the Port of Tauranga on port reforms that took place in the late 1980s and early 1990s.

=== Political career ===
New Zealand Parliament
Years	Term	Electorate	List	Party
1996–1999	45th	List	14	NZ First
1999–2002	46th	List	2	NZ First
2002–2005	47th	List	2	NZ First
2005–2008	48th	List	2	NZ First

Brown was a member of the National Party for many years but left the party in 1993, angered by what he regarded as the Fourth National Government's betrayal of its 1990 election pledges. Instead he joined New Zealand First and stood as the party's candidate for the seat of Kaimai at the 1993 election and came a close second, reducing incumbent National MP Robert Anderson's majority from 8,147 to just 372. He became New Zealand First's spokesperson for transport and communications. At the 1996 election he was elected to parliament as a List MP. In 1998 Brown was elected deputy leader of the party unopposed to replace Tau Henare who had been dumped from the deputy leadership a week earlier after a personality clash between Henare and party leader Winston Peters.

In April 2008, Brown – an immigrant himself – drew widespread attention after voicing similar views and expressing concern at the increase in New Zealand's immigrant population, specifically ethnic Asians: "We are going to flood this country with Asian people with no idea what we are going to do with them when they come here." "The matter is serious. If we continue this open door policy there is real danger we will be inundated with people who have no intention of integrating into our society. The greater the number, the greater the risk. They will form their own mini-societies to the detriment of integration and that will lead to division, friction and resentment."

Brown left Parliament after the 2008 election in which New Zealand First lost all its seats. He was succeeded in the deputy leader role in 2009 by Tracey Martin.

== Personal life ==
Brown is married and has had two children. He enjoys sport, literature, theatre and music.

== Notes ==
Party political offices
Preceded by Tau Henare	Deputy leader of New Zealand First; 1998–2009	Succeeded by Tracey Martin
