= 2006 New Zealand National Party leadership election =

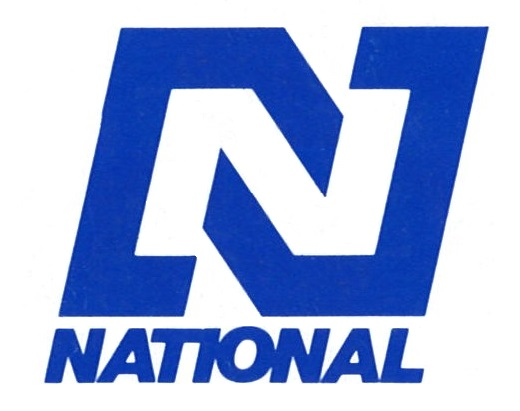
- 27 November 2006
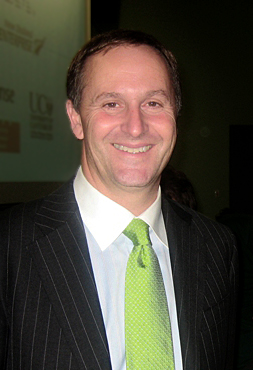
| Candidate | John Key |
| Popular vote | elected unopposed |
Leader before election
Don Brash
Leader after election
John Key

The New Zealand National Party leadership election was an election for the National leadership position in 2006 following the resignation of Don Brash.

== Background ==
In November 2006, after months of speculation, Don Brash announced his resignation as leader of the National Party following the release of Nicky Hager's book The Hollow Men which focused on Brash's conduct as leader and his secret dealings concerning the Exclusive Brethren. Shadow Finance Minister John Key was picked by the media as most likely to win the leadership, though former leader Bill English appeared to be running again leading a faction of 10–14 MPs. A contest was avoided on the weekend before the contest where a deal was worked out that saw English withdraw in return for the deputy leadership and finance portfolio.

As a result, John Key was duly elected unopposed as Brash's replacement (with English as his deputy) and consequently became Leader of the Opposition.

== See also ==
- Shadow Cabinet of John Key
