= Brian Donnelly (New Zealand politician) =

New Zealand politician

The Honourable Brian Donnelly QSO
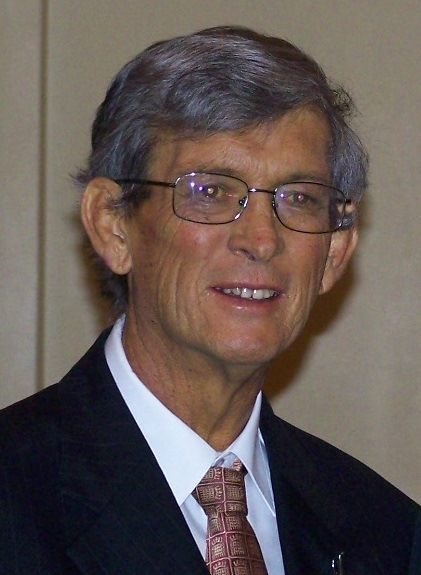
- Donnelly in 2008

High Commissioner to the Cook Islands
- In office February 2008 – August 2008

Member of the New Zealand Parliament for New Zealand First party list
- In office 12 October 1996 – 14 February 2008
- Succeeded by: Dail Jones (Note: Normally, list MPs do not have individual predecessors or successors, but Donnelly resigned during a sitting parliament and therefore was succeeded by Jones.)

Personal details
- Born: 5 November 1949 Auckland, New Zealand
- Died: 25 September 2008 (aged 58) Sister of Mercy Hospice, Auckland, New Zealand
- Party: New Zealand First
- Spouse(s): Linda Pye (m. 1970)
- Children: 3
- Profession: Teacher

Brian John Donnelly QSO (5 November 1949 – 25 September 2008) was a New Zealand politician. He was a member of the New Zealand First party.

== Early life and career ==
Donnelly was born in Auckland, New Zealand, as the third of five children. His father worked as a fabric cutter and later as a real estate agent. Donnelly attended Sacred Heart College on a scholarship. He studied at Massey University and the University of Auckland, and received a Bachelor of Arts, a Bachelor of Education, a Master of Educational Administration, a Diploma in Teaching, and a Diploma in Second Language Teaching.

He worked in the education sector in New Zealand and the Cook Islands. His educational leadership roles included deputy principal at Titikaveka College in Rarotonga from 1977 to 1980 and principal of Whangarei Intermediate School from 1990 to 1996 (only resigning from the latter on entering parliament). Previously he had also been a lecturer at the Auckland College of Education and worked for the Education Review Office.

== Member of Parliament ==
New Zealand Parliament
Years	Term	Electorate	List	Party
1996–1999	45th	List	6	NZ First
1999–2002	46th	List	3	NZ First
2002–2005	47th	List	3	NZ First
2005–2008	48th	List	3	NZ First

In the 1993 election, he stood for the newly formed New Zealand First in the Whangarei electorate, but was unsuccessful. Donnelly stood again for New Zealand First in Whangarei in the 1996 election and, with the advent of the MMP system, was ranked sixth on the party list. Through the election campaign he was regarded as "an impressive speaker at party gatherings."

New Zealand First performed well in the election and Donnelly was elected a list MP. As the party's education spokesperson, when New Zealand First formed a coalition with the National Party, he became Minister Responsible for the Education Review Office, Associate Minister of Education, and Associate Minister of Pacific Island Affairs. As well as sitting as a minister outside of Cabinet, Donnelly was a member of parliament's foreign affairs, defence and trade committee.

Donnelly left his ministerial roles on 26 August 1998 when the coalition collapsed. Donnelly was among the half of New Zealand First members who remained loyal to the party and did not provide continuing support to the government. In the 1999 election Donnelly was ranked third on the New Zealand First list and returned to Parliament as one of the party's five members. He continued as the party's education spokesperson and also became spokesperson for youth and sports. He sat as a member of the education and science committee. In this term, Parliament passed the Rating Powers (Special Provision for Certain Rates for Educational Establishments) Amendment Act 2001, which had been a member's bill in Donnelly's name. The purpose of the Act was to set an upper limit on the sewerage disposal rate paid by schools.

Donnelly was returned as a list MP for his third and fourth terms at the elections in 2002 and 2005. Through both of those terms, he chaired the education and science committee. As well as being his party's spokesperson for education and science, he also had responsibility for biosecurity, communications and information technology, industry training, local government, Pacific island affairs, and regional development.

Donnelly was regarded as a social liberal within his caucus. He voted for legislation enabling civil unions in New Zealand and Sue Bradford's member's bill to remove the provision allowing parents to use reasonable force in correcting their children. In retaliation, current New Zealand First President Dail Jones threatened demotion of the long-serving List MP, as well as fellow repeal supporter Doug Woolerton. Donnelly was widely respected by members from other political parties and was considered a potential successor to New Zealand First leader Winston Peters.

Donnelly retired from Parliament in February 2008 to take up the role of New Zealand's High Commissioner to the Cook Islands. He was succeeded as a list member of Parliament by Dail Jones.

== High Commissioner to the Cook Islands ==
Donnelly had a long association with the Cook Islands which included several years working there as a teacher and representing the islands in rugby. His youngest two children were adopted from the Cook Islands. He learned to speak Cook Islands Māori fluently during his time living there. His appointment as New Zealand's High Commissioner to the Cook Islands was brief, from February to August 2008, and ended when he resigned due to ill health.

In the 2008 Queen's Birthday Honours, Donnelly was appointed a Companion of the Queen's Service Order, for public services.

== Personal life ==
Donnelly met his wife Linda through teaching and they married in 1970. They had three children, Theresa, Ioane, and Erena. The youngest two children were adopted.

Donnelly died on 25 September 2008 following a period of illness.
