= List MP =

MP without a geographic constituency

A list MP is a member of parliament (MP) elected from a party list rather than a geographic electoral district. The place in Parliament is due to the number of votes cast for the party, not to votes cast for the MP personally. This occurs only in countries with an electoral system based wholly or partly on party-list proportional representation.

== Different systems ==
In closed list system, voters choose a party, the party receives a number of seats in Parliament proportional to its share of the vote, and the seats that party wins are filled by candidates in the order set by the party before the election.

In open list systems, seats are also allocated to lists in proportion to their vote shares, but voters can express a preference for individual candidates and influence who fills those seats. The rules vary between systems, including how many candidates voters can support and how candidate preferences affect the order in which seats are filled. Such systems are used in Fiji, Indonesia and Sri Lanka.

In other countries, a more complicated system is used. In the method used in Japan, South Korea and Taiwan, some seats are filled using party lists, while others are filled by the "traditional" first-past-the-post (FPP) voting system. Under the mixed member proportional (MMP) system, the method used in Germany and New Zealand, a merger of party-list representation and geographic representation is employed — parties contest geographic seats (districts) but are then "topped up" with members from a party list.

=== Indonesia ===
In Indonesia, members of the House of Representatives are elected through an open-list system in multi-member electoral districts. Voters can select either a political party or an individual candidate from a party’s list. Seats are allocated to parties proportionally according to their votes, with the candidates receiving the most individual votes within each party winning those seats. Unlike a closed-list system, the order in which candidates are elected is determined by voters rather than by the political parties.

=== Israel ===
Israel uses a closed list system to elect all 120 members of the Knesset in a single nationwide constituency, with seats allocated roughly in proportion to the vote shares of lists that meet the 3.25 per cent electoral threshold.

=== Japan ===
In Japan, 176 of the 465 members of the House of Representatives are elected from party lists, in 11 regional electoral blocs. The remaining 289 members are elected from single-member constituencies. Voters cast separate ballots for a constituency candidate and a political party, with proportional representation seats allocated according to each party’s share of the vote.

=== New Zealand ===
New Zealand has at least 120 members of Parliament (MPs), of which 71 are electorate seats elected using FPP, and the other MPs are selected from the party lists. The number of list MPs each party receives is the difference between a party's proportional allocation of parliamentary seats and its number of electorate MPs. When a party wins more electorate seats than it is entitled to under its proportion of the party vote, it still receives those electorate seats, creating an "overhang". Since the introduction of the list of MPs, New Zealand parliaments have been more proportionate.

== Controversies ==
The existence of a list of MPs has caused controversy in some countries. It is sometimes complained that because list MPs do not have a geographic electorate, they are not properly accountable to anyone. In addition, the methods used to create party lists are sometimes criticised as undemocratic — in a closed list system, the public has no way of influencing the composition of a party list. In this situation, the public cannot support one candidate without supporting other candidates from the same party. Supporters of party-list proportional representation sometimes retort that the public often has little control over the selection of local candidates, either — if a voter's preferred party selects a poor candidate, the voter is forced to either vote for a candidate they dislike or vote for a party they dislike. Under a party list system, voters can support their preferred party even if they are unwilling to vote for its local candidate.

An open list system, however, may go some way to addressing the concern that voters can only support all the candidates the party proposed. A notable example of this was in the 2006 Dutch general election. The VVD had chosen Mark Rutte as their "list puller" (lijsttrekker). In the Netherlands, the party leader usually gets a large majority of the votes for that party, but in 2006, the number 2 on the list, Rita Verdonk, got over 10% more votes than Mark Rutte. This eventually led to Rita Verdonk leaving the VVD and starting her own party.

There is also debate about the right of a list MP to switch parties. Because list MPs gain their seats by virtue of being on a party list rather than by winning votes personally, some contend that the party, not the MP, is the rightful "owner" of the seat. In New Zealand, there have been several controversies regarding list MPs who left their parties — Alamein Kopu, elected from the Alliance list, controversially became an independent, and Donna Awatere Huata, elected from the ACT list, similarly became an independent. In the latter case, Awatere Huata's former party went to the Supreme Court to expel her from Parliament under so-called waka-jumping or "party-hopping" legislation. ACT alleged that it was ACT, not Awatere Huata, who was awarded the seat in the last election and that when Awatere Huata left ACT, she should not have been able to take the seat with her. ACT's view was accepted, and Awatere Huata was expelled from Parliament.

In New Zealand, it has been suggested by Dr Oliver Hartwich that parties "gaming" the MMP system by distorting the number of electorate MPs a party gets compared to the list MPs it would be entitled to, could encourage the abolition of MMP.
