= Candidates in the 2008 New Zealand general election by electorate =

New Zealand political candidates in the MMP era
Year	Party list	Candidates
1996	party lists	by electorate
1999	party lists	by electorate
2002	party lists	by electorate
2005	party lists	by electorate
2008	party lists	by electorate
2011	party lists	by electorate
2014	party lists	by electorate
2017	party lists	by electorate
2020	party lists	by electorate
2023	party lists	by electorate
2026	party lists	by electorate

Seventy of the one hundred and twenty members of the New Zealand House of Representatives elected in New Zealand's 2008 general election will be from single member constituencies, an increase of one electorate seat from 2005. The initial composition of the 2005 Parliament gave the Labour and National parties each 31 constituencies, the Māori Party four and ACT, United Future and the Progressive Party one each.

The election was held on Saturday, 8 November. Nominations for constituency candidates closed at noon on Wednesday, 14 October; this is the final list.

Lines coloured pink denote an MP elected from a party list; lines coloured beige denote the winner of the constituency vote.

== General electorates ==
=== Auckland Central ===
Name	Party	Notes	Source
Kerry Bevin	The Republic of New Zealand Party	party leader	
Sarita Divis	Alliance		
Thomas Forde	Independent		
Aaron Galey-Young	United Future		
Stephen Greenfield	Independent		
Nikki Kaye	National Party	winner	
Kevin O'Connell	Aotearoa Legalise Cannabis Party		
Anthony Ravlich	Human Rights Party		
Justin Robson	Progressive Party		
Denise Roche	Green Party		
Judith Tizard	Labour Party	Incumbent, 1996–2008; MP since 1990; defeated	
Scott Uren	ACT		
Oliver Woods	Residents Action Movement		

=== Bay of Plenty ===
Name	Party	Notes	Source
Peter Brown	New Zealand First	list MP 1996–2008; deputy party leader; not returned to parliament	
Brian Carter	United Future		
Tony Christiansen	Kiwi Party		
Francis Denz	ACT		
Carol Devoy-Heena	Labour Party		
Tony Ryall	National Party	Incumbent since 1996; MP since 1990; winner	

=== Botany ===
New seat

Name	Party	Notes	Source
Judy Carter	United Future		
Racheal Cheam	Progressive Party		
Peter Cooper	Green Party		
Simon Kan	Kiwi Party		
Raj Subramanian	Independent		
Koro Tawa	Labour Party		
Kenneth Wang	ACT	List MP 2004–05	
Pansy Wong	National Party	List MP, 1996–2008; winner	

=== Christchurch Central ===
Incumbent Tim Barnett of the Labour Party retired at the 2008 election, having been the MP for Christchurch Central since 1996.

Name	Party	Notes	Source
Somnath Bagchi	Progressive Party		
Andrew Beaven	Kiwi Party		
Mike Britnall	Aotearoa Legalise Cannabis Party		
Brendon Burns	Labour Party	winner	
Byron Clark	Workers Party		
Greg Kleis	Alliance		
Jan McLauchlan	Green Party		
Toni Severin	ACT		
Nicky Wagner	National Party	List MP 2005–present; elected off party list	

=== Christchurch East ===
Name	Party	Notes	Source
Lianne Dalziel	Labour Party	incumbent since 1999; MP since 1990; winner	
Aaron Gilmore	National Party	elected off party list	
Paul Hopkinson	Workers Party		
Tony le Cren	Kiwi Party		
Nick McIlraith	Democrats for Social Credit		
Mojo Mathers	Green Party		
Sevaschan Park	Independent		
Paul Piesse	Alliance		
Elspeth Sandys	Progressive Party		
Maretta Solomon	United Future		

=== Clutha-Southland ===
Name	Party	Notes	Source
Bill English	National Party	Incumbent, current National Party deputy leader, winner	
Tim Gow	Green Party		
Roly Henderson	ACT		
Marvin Hubbard	Alliance		
Don Pryde	Labour Party	Engineering, Printing and Manufacturing Union President	
Paul Tankard	Family Party		

=== Coromandel ===
Name	Party	Notes	Source
Ray Bassett	ACT		
Sandra Goudie	National Party	Incumbent since 2002; winner	
Hugh Kininmonth	Labour Party		
James Redwood	Green Party		
Huey Rurehe	Kiwi Party		

=== Dunedin North ===
Name	Party	Notes	Source
Victor Billot	Alliance	2005 candidate	
Hilary Calvert	ACT		
Julian Crawford	Aotearoa Legalise Cannabis Party		
Pete Hodgson	Labour Party	incumbent; winner	
Mary Edwards	United Future		
Olive McCrae	Democrats for Social Credit		
Metiria Turei	Green Party	current MP; elected from party list	
Michael Woodhouse	National Party	elected from party list	

=== Dunedin South ===
Incumbent Labour MP David Benson-Pope was deselected in 2008, having served as MP for Dunedin South since 1999.

Name	Party	Notes	Source
David Bernhardt	Independent		
Clare Curran	Labour Party	winner	
Shane Gallagher	Green Party		
Jacqui McAlpine	Progressive Party		
Dawn McIntosh	Democrats for Social Credit		
Pauline Moffat	United Future		
Kay Murray	Alliance		
Colin Nicholls	ACT		
Conway Powell	National Party	2005 candidate	
Robert Wansink	Restore All Things In Christ		
Philip Wescombe	Kiwi Party		

=== East Coast ===
Name	Party	Notes	Source
Catherine Delahunty	Green Party	2005 candidate, elected from party list	
Brendan Horan	New Zealand First		
Moana Mackey	Labour Party	List MP, 2003–present; elected from party list	
Anne Tolley	National Party	Incumbent MP since 2005; List MP from 1999–2002; winner	
Judy Turner	United Future	List MP 2002–2008; United Party deputy leader; not re-elected	

=== East Coast Bays ===
Name	Party	Notes	Source
Paul Adams	Family Party	United Future list MP 2002–05	
Sue Bradford	Green Party	list MP; 1999–present; elected from party list	
Vivienne Goldsmith	Labour Party		
Toby Hutton	No Commercial Airport at Whenuapai		
Dail Jones	New Zealand First	current list MP; not re-elected	
Tim Kronfield	ACT		
Murray McCully	National Party	Incumbent since 1996; MP since 1987; winner	
Ian McInnes	United Future		
Elah Zamora	Libertarianz		

=== Epsom ===
Name	Party	Notes	Source
Andrena Bishop	Human Rights Party		
Rafe Copeland	Residents Action Movement		
Grace Haden	Kiwi Party		
Rodney Hide	ACT	Incumbent since 2005; MP since 1996, current ACT Party leader; winner	
Keith Locke	Green Party	list MP since 1999; 2005 candidate; elected from party list	
Kate Sutton	Labour Party		
Janet Tuck	United Future	2005 candidate	
Richard Worth	National Party	MP for Epsom, 1999–2005; List MP; elected from party list	

=== Hamilton East ===
Name	Party	Notes	Source
David Bennett	National Party	Incumbent since 2005; winner	
Jack Gielen	The Republic of New Zealand Party		
Robyn Jackson	Kiwi Party		
Garry Mallett	ACT		
Sue Moroney	Labour Party	List MP since 2005; elected from party list	
Linda Persson	Green Party		
Rochelle White	United Future		
Doug Woolerton	New Zealand First	list MP since 1996; not re-elected	

=== Hamilton West ===
Name	Party	Notes	Source
Martin Gallagher	Labour Party	incumbent1999–2008 and 1993–96; not re-elected	
Tim Macindoe	National Party	2005 candidate; winner	
Ian Parker	ACT		
Ken Smith	United Future		
Dale Stevens	Green Party		
Suresh Vatsyayann	Independent		
Tim Wikiriwhi	Libertarianz	2005 candidate	

=== Helensville ===
Name	Party	Notes	Source
David Clendon	Green Party		
Darien Fenton	Labour Party	List MP since 2005, elected from party list	
David Garrett	ACT	elected from party list	
John Key	National Party	Incumbent since 2002, current Leader of the Opposition; current Leader of the National Party; winner	
Angela Lovelock	United Future		
Peter Osborne	Libertarianz		

=== Hunua ===
New seat largely replacing the old Port Waikato seat.

Name	Party	Notes	Source
Jordan Carter	Labour Party		
Sir Roger Douglas	ACT	Former MP 1969–1990, Minister of Finance 1984-88; elected from party list	
Toni Driller	United Future		
Paul Hutchison	National Party	MP for Port Waikato 1996–2008; winner	
Fiona Kenworthy	Green Party		
Helen Mulford	New Zealand First		
Frank Naea	Kiwi Party		
Bruce Whitehead	Libertarianz		

=== Hutt South ===
Name	Party	Notes	Source
Camilia Chin	Kiwi Party		
Virginia Horrocks	Green Party		
Phil Howison	Libertarianz	2005 candidate	
Trevor Mallard	Labour Party	Incumbent 1996–present; MP since 1993 and from 1984–90; winner	
Lindsay Mitchell	ACT	2005 candidate	
Paul Quinn	National Party	elected from party list	
Murray Smith	United Future	Former List MP 2002–05; 2005 candidate	

=== Ilam ===
Name	Party	Notes	Source
Gerry Brownlee	National Party	Incumbent since 1996; winner	
Brian Davidson	ACT		
Kennedy Graham	Green Party	elected from party list after the counting of the special votes	
Craig Hutchinson	Progressive Party		
John Pickering	United Future		
David Weusten	Kiwi Party		
Sam Yau	Labour Party		

=== Invercargill ===
Name	Party	Notes	Source
Ian Carline	ACT		
Craig Carson	Green Party	2005 candidate	
Shane Pleasance	Libertarianz		
Eric Roy	National Party	Incumbent since 2005; MP from 1993–2002; winner	
Maureen Smith	United Future		
Lesley Soper	Labour Party	List MP, 2005; 2007–2008; not re-elected	

=== Kaikōura ===
Name	Party	Notes	Source
Alastair Belcher	Kiwi Party		
Steffan Browning	Green Party	2005 candidate	
Coralie Christie	United Future		
Colin King	National Party	Incumbent since 2005; winner	
Linda King	New Zealand First		
John McCaskey	Democrats for Social Credit		
Brian McNamara	Labour Party		
Dave Tattersfield	ACT		

=== Mana ===
Name	Party	Notes	Source
Michael Collins	ACT	2005 candidate	
Michael Gilchrist	Green Party		
Richard Goode	Libertarianz		
Robin Gunson	United Future	2005 candidate	
Luamanuvao Winnie Laban	Labour Party	incumbent since 2002; MP since 1999; winner	
Renton Maclachlan	Kiwi Party		
Tim Manu	Pacific Party		
Hekia Parata	National Party	elected from party list	

=== Māngere ===
Sitting MP Taito Phillip Field was expelled from the Labour Party in 2007 and will contest the seat for the New Zealand Pacific Party.

Name	Party	Notes	Source
Taito Phillip Field	Pacific Party	incumbent from 1996–2008; MP since 1993 (as Labour); not returned to Parliament	
Jerry Filipaina	Family Party		
Roger Fowler	Residents Action Movement		
Mita Harris	National Party		
Lemalu Matatumua	Independent		
Tala P'oe	Progressive Party		
William Sio	Labour Party	List MP since 2008; winner	
Pulotu Selio Solomon	United Future		
Mua Strickson-Pua	Green Party		
Michael Tabachnik	ACT		

=== Manukau East ===
Name	Party	Notes	Source
Kanwal Singh Bakshi	National Party	elected from party list	
Trevor Barnard	Progressive Party		
Manogi Turua Head	United Future		
Tevanga Leavasa	Pacific Party		
Lynn Murphy	ACT		
Poutua Papali'l	Family Party		
Ross Robertson	Labour Party	incumbent since 1996; MP since 1987; winner	
Kevin Stitt	Kiwi Party		
Annalucia Vermunt	Communist League		
Daphna Whitmore	Workers Party		
Donna Wynd	Green Party		

=== Manurewa ===
Name	Party	Notes	Source
Michael Bailey	ACT		
Sukhdev Bains	Progressive Party		
Cam Calder	National Party	initially elected from party list until the return of special votes	
John Hall	New Zealand First		
George Hawkins	Labour Party	incumbent since 1996; MP since 1990; winner	
Alan Johnson	Green Party		
Amjad Khan	Kiwi Party		
Richard Lewis	Family Party	party leader; former leader of Destiny New Zealand	
Jim Stowers	United Future		
Vui Vitale	Pacific Party		

=== Maungakiekie ===
Sitting Labour MP Mark Gosche is retiring in 2008, having served as electorate MP for Maungakiekie since 1999.

Name	Party	Notes	Source
Carol Beaumont	Labour Party	elected from party list	
Elliott Blade	Residents Action Movement		
Patrick Brown	Communist League		
Darren Jones	Pacific Party		
Denise Krum	United Future	Party president	
Asenati Lole-Taylor	New Zealand First		
Peseta Sam Lotu-Iiga	National Party	Auckland City Councilor; winner	
Athol McQuilkan	ACT		
Bernie Ogilvy	Kiwi Party	Former United Future MP	
Rawiri Paratene	Green Party		
Matt Robson	Progressive Party	Former MP	

=== Mount Albert ===
Name	Party	Notes	Source
Jon Carapiet	Green Party		
Helen Clark	Labour Party	Prime Minister, Labour leader, incumbent since 1996; MP since 1981; winner/ resigned from Parliament after 2008 General Election. By- election saw the win of Labour Party candidate, David Shearer	
Christian Dawson	Kiwi Party		
Dave Llewll	The Republic of New Zealand Party		
Kathleen McCabe	ACT		
Ravi Musuku	National Party	2005 candidate	
Milo Siilata	Pacific Party		
Anthony van den Heuvel	Human Rights Party		

=== Mount Roskill ===
Name	Party	Notes	Source
Suki Amirapu	Progressive Party		
Jackie Blue	National Party	List MP 2005–present; elected from party list	
Lisa Er	Green Party		
Phil Goff	Labour Party	Incumbent since 1999; MP 1993–present and 1981–90; winner. Goff, from post 2008 general election to present, is the Labour Leader of the Opposition	
Daphne Lawless	Residents Action Movement		
Joseph Rebello	Kiwi Party		
Shawn Tan	ACT		
Neville Wilson	United Future		

=== Napier ===
Name	Party	Notes	Source
Russell Fairbrother	Labour Party	MP 2002–08; not re-elected	
John Ormond	ACT		
Brett Stansfield	Green Party		
Chris Tremain	National Party	Incumbent since 2005; winner	

=== Nelson ===
Name	Party	Notes	Source
Kelvin Deal	United Future		
Paul Hufflett	ACT		
Diana Mellor	Green Party		
Nick Smith	National Party	Incumbent since 1996; MP since 1990; winner	
Maryan Street	Labour Party	List MP since 2005; elected off party list	
Robin Westley	Kiwi Party		

=== New Lynn ===
Name	Party	Notes	Source
David Cunliffe	Labour Party	Incumbent since 1999; winner	
Kerryanne Dalgleish	United Future		
Kath Dewar	Green Party		
Tim Groser	National Party	List MP 2005–present; elected from party list	
Mohammad Kazemi-Yazdi	Progressive Party		
Michael Tasker	ACT		

=== New Plymouth ===
Name	Party	Notes	Source
Chris Albers	ACT		
Harry Duynhoven	Labour Party	Incumbent since 1996; MP 1993–2008 and 1984–90; not re-elected	
Rusty Kane	Independent		
Mike Webber	Libertarianz	2005 candidate	
Jonathan Young	National Party	winner	

=== North Shore ===
Name	Party	Notes	Source
John Boscawen	ACT	elected from party list	
Louise Cleary	Family Party		
Stephen Cooper	Residents Action Movement		
Joe Gregory	New Zealand First		
Damian Light	United Future		
Wayne Mapp	National Party	Incumbent since 1996; winner	
Michael Murphy	Libertarianz	2005 candidate	
Phil Twyford	Labour Party	2005 candidate; elected from party list	
Pieter Watson	Green Party		

=== Northcote ===
Name	Party	Notes	Source
Jonathan Coleman	National Party	Incumbent since 2005; winner	
Benjamin Doherty	Residents Action Movement		
Steven Dromgool	United Future		
Jeanette Elley	Green Party		
Brenda Hill	Progressive Party		
Nick Kearney	ACT		
Peter Linton	Libertarianz		
Hamish McCracken	Labour Party		
Barry McDonald	Kiwi Party		
Angela Xu	Family Party		

=== Northland ===
Name	Party	Notes	Source
John Carter	National Party	Incumbent since 1996; MP since 1987; winner	
Shane Jones	Labour Party	List MP, 2005–present; elected from party list	
Martin Leiding	Green Party		
Mike Shaw	Kiwi Party		
Melanie Taylor	Family Party		
David Wilson	Democrats for Social Credit		
Alan Wood	ACT		

=== Ōhariu ===
new seat largely replacing Ōhariu-Belmont.

Name	Party	Notes	Source
Kelly Buchanan	Alliance	2005 Mana candidate	
Charles Chauvel	Labour Party	List MP 2006–present; 2005 Ōhariu-Belmont candidate; elected from party list	
Colin du Plessis	ACT		
Peter Dunne	United Future	MP for Ōhariu-Belmont 1996–present; MP since 1984; United Future party leader; won the seat	
Gareth Hughes	Green Party	Will be elected from the party list in 2010 to replace Jeanette Fitzsimons	
Katrina Shanks	National Party	List MP since 2007; 2005 candidate for Ōhariu-Belmont; elected from party list	
Joel Sison	Kiwi Party		
Danyl Strype	Aotearoa Legalise Cannabis Party		

=== Ōtaki ===
Name	Party	Notes	Source
Dianne Brown	United Future		
Nathan Guy	National Party	List MP 2005–08; winner	
Darren Hughes	Labour Party	Incumbent 2002–2008; returned to Parliament from party list	
Jim Kebbel	Green		
Peter McCaffrey	ACT		
Josie Pagani	Progressive Party		
David Scott	New Zealand First		

=== Pakuranga ===
Name	Party	Notes	Source
Zachary Dorner	Green Party		
Brian Hilder	Kiwi Party		
Andrew Jollands	ACT		
Brian Kelly	Labour Party		
Jeffrey Ly	Progressive Party		
Pita Paraone	New Zealand First	MP, 2002–08; not returned to parliament	
Quentin Todd	United Future		
Maurice Williamson	National Party	Incumbent since 1996; MP since 1987; winner	

=== Palmerston North ===
Sitting Labour MP Steve Maharey is retiring at the 2008 election, having been MP for the seat since 1990.

Name	Party	Notes	Source
Arshad Chatha	Independent		
Kevin Dittmer	ACT		
Iain Lees-Galloway	Labour Party	winner	
Debbie Lucas	Progressive Party		
Lawrence O'Halloran	Green Party	2005 candidate	
Graham Odering	New Zealand First	2005 candidate	
Frank Owen	United Future		
Malcolm Plimmer	National Party	2005 candidate	
Grant Seton	Independent		

=== Papakura ===
New seat largely replacing the old Clevedon seat.

Name	Party	Notes	Source
Brent Catchpole	New Zealand First	List MP 2002–05	
Judith Collins	National Party	MP for Clevedon, 2002–08; winner	
Rachel Grimwood	Green Party		
Dave Hereora	Labour Party	List MP, 2002–2008; not re-elected	
Bryan Mockridge	United Future		
Pat O'Dea	Residents Action Movement		
John Thompson	ACT		

=== Port Hills ===
New seat largely replacing the old Banks Peninsula seat.

Name	Party	Notes	Source
Joseph Burston	Green Party		
Phil Clearwater	Progressive Party		
Ruth Dyson	Labour Party	MP for Banks Peninsula, 1999–2008; MP since 1993; winner	
Wilton Gray	Kiwi Party		
Terry Heffernan	National Party		
Robin Loomes	United Future		
Andrew McKenzie	Alliance		
Geoff Russell	ACT		

=== Rangitata ===
New seat

Name	Party	Notes	Source
Julian Blanchard	Labour Party		
Tony Bunting	Kiwi Party		
Jo Goodhew	National Party	MP for Aoraki, 2005–08; winner	
Peter McCaw	ACT		
Paul Tew	Independent		
Brian Ward	United Future		

=== Rangitīkei ===
Name	Party	Notes	Source
Jills Angus Burney	Labour Party		
Steve Gibson	Independent		
John Langford	United Future		
Simon Power	National Party	Incumbent since 1999; winner	
Jean Thompson	ACT		

=== Rimutaka ===
Incumbent MP Paul Swain of the Labour Party stood down as MP for Rimutaka after twelve years, having served various Hutt Valley electorates since 1990.

Name	Party	Notes	Source
Chris Hipkins	Labour Party	winner	
Jenni Hurn	United Future		
Nigel Kearney	ACT		
Ron Mark	New Zealand First	List MP since 1996; not returned to Parliament	
John Maurice	Progressive Party		
Lynette Vigrass	Green Party		
Richard Whiteside	National Party		

=== Rodney ===
Name	Party	Notes	Source
Karl Adams	Family Party		
Kathleen Deal	United Future		
Simonne Dyer	Kiwi Party		
Beryl Good	ACT		
David Hay	Green Party		
Tracey Martin	New Zealand First		
Conor Roberts	Labour Party		
Lockwood Smith	National Party	Incumbent since 1996; MP since 1984; winner	

=== Rongotai ===
Name	Party	Notes	Source
Mike Bridge	ACT		
Gordon Copeland	Kiwi Party	ex-United Future list MP 2002–2008; not re-elected	
Chris Finlayson	National Party	List MP 2005– ; elected from party list	
Annette King	Labour Party	Incumbent since 1986; MP 1993–present and 1984–90; winner	
Mitch Lees	Libertarianz		
Karuna Muthu	United Future		
Russel Norman	Green Party	Co-leader of the Green Party; MP since 2008; elected from party list	

=== Rotorua ===
Name	Party	Notes	Source
Steve Chadwick	Labour Party	Incumbent since 1999; defeated in constituency and returned from party list	
Todd McClay	National Party	winner	
Grant Rogers	Residents Action Movement		
Raewyn Saville	Green Party		
Daryl Smith	Kiwi Party		
Arthur Solomon	United Future		
Fred Stevens	Libertarianz		

=== Selwyn ===
New seat largely replacing the old Rakaia seat.

Name	Party	Notes	Source
Amy Adams	National Party	winner	
David Coates	Labour Party		
Samuel Dennis	Family Party		
Phillipa Main	Progressive Party		
Victoria Norman	United Future		
Ivor Watson	ACT		
Eleanor Williamson	Kiwi Party		
Bill Woods	Independent		

=== Tāmaki ===
Name	Party	Notes	Source
Josephine Bartley	Labour		
Greg Graydon	United Future		
Richard Leckinger	Green Party		
Doug Nabbs	New Zealand First		
Allan Peachey	National Party	Incumbent since 2005; winner	
Chris Simmonds	ACT		
Ralph Taylor	Progressive Party		

=== Taranaki-King Country ===
Name	Party	Notes	Source
Shane Ardern	National Party	Incumbent since 1998; winner	
Rob Hamill	Green	Also known as an Olympic rower	
Bill Izard	ACT		
Iain Parker	Democrats for Social Credit		
Renee van de Wert	Labour Party		

=== Taupō ===
Name	Party	Notes	Source
Martin Bloxham	Independent		
Mark Burton	Labour Party	Incumbent 1996–2008; MP from 1993–2008; not re-elected	
Max Edwards	United Future		
Robbie Mac	Independent		
Louise Upston	National Party	winner	

=== Tauranga ===
Incumbent MP Bob Clarkson of the National Party is retiring in 2008, having served as MP for Tauranga since 2005.

Name	Party	Notes	Source
Larry Baldock	Kiwi Party	United Future list MP 2002–05; Leader of The Kiwi Party	
Simon Bridges	National Party	winner	
Gray Eatwell	Independent		
Terry Leaming	Independent		
David Macartney	The Republic of New Zealand Party		
Anne Pankhurst	Labour Party		
Winston Peters	New Zealand First	List MP; MP for Tauranga 1984–2005; Leader of New Zealand First; not returned to Parliament	
Katherine Ransom	Democrats for Social Credit		
Ron Scott	ACT		
Karen Summerhays	Green Party		
John Willocks	United Future		

=== Te Atatū ===
Name	Party	Notes	Source
Fiasili Ah Tong	Pacific Party		
Lech Beltowski	ACT		
Chris Carter	Labour Party	Incumbent 1999–present and 1993–96; winner	
Xavier Goldie	Green Party		
Tau Henare	National Party	list MP 2005–present; MP (New Zealand First, Independent, Mauri Pacific) 1993–99; elected from party list	
Pavitra Roy	Progressive Party		
Talei Solomon-Mua	United Future		
Jo van Kempen	Kiwi Party		
Bob van Ruyssevelt	Alliance		

=== Tukituki ===
Name	Party	Notes	Source
Rick Barker	Labour Party	List MP 2005; MP for Tukituki 1996–05; MP since 1993; elected from party list	
Quentin Duthie	Green Party		
Craig Foss	National Party	Incumbent 2005–present; winner	
Duncan Lennox	ACT		
Thomas O’Neill	Alliance		
Dawn Patchett	Progressive Party		
Barry Pulford	Democrats for Social Credit		

=== Waikato ===
New seat largely replacing the old Piako seat.

Name	Party	Notes	Source
Jacinda Ardern	Labour Party	elected from party list	
Mark Davies	ACT		
Wendy Harper	Green Party		
John Pemberton	Democrats for Social Credit		
James Ross	Kiwi Party		
Barbara Stewart	New Zealand First	MP 2002–08; not re-elected	
Lindsay Tisch	National Party	MP for Piako 2002–present; MP since 1999; winner	

=== Waimakariri ===
Name	Party	Notes	Source
Leighton Baker	Kiwi Party		
Clayton Cosgrove	Labour Party	Incumbent since 1999; winner	
Aaron Keown	ACT		
Alan Liefting	Green Party		
Melanie Mark-Shadbolt	New Zealand First		
Kelleigh Sheffield-Cranstoun	United Future		
Kate Wilkinson	National Party	list MP 2005–present; elected from party list	

=== Wairarapa ===
Name	Party	Notes	Source
Shane Atkinson	ACT		
John Hayes	National Party	Incumbent since 2005; winner	
Denise Mackenzie	Labour Party	2005 candidate	
Richard McGrath	Libertarianz		
Edwin Perry	New Zealand First	MP 2002–05	
Graeme Reeves	United Future	National Party MP for Miramar, 1990–93	
Amy Tubman	Alliance		
Michael Woodcock	Green Party		

=== Waitakere ===
Name	Party	Notes	Source
Rita Beckmannflay	Independent		
Paula Bennett	National Party	List MP 2005–2008; winner	
Sandra Ethell	Alliance		
Michael Kidd	Family Party		
Craig McNair	New Zealand First	MP 2002–05	
Fia Misa Tupou	Pacific Party		
Lynne Pillay	Labour Party	Incumbent 2002–2008; returned to parliament from party list	
John Riddell	ACT		
Gary Stewart	Green Party		

=== Waitaki ===
New seat largely replacing the old Otago seat.

Name	Party	Notes	Source
Oliver Briggs	Green Party		
Jacqui Dean	National	MP for Otago 2005–08; winner	
John Fraser	ACT		
Simon Guy	Direct Democracy		
Claire Main	Progressive Party		
Norm MacRitchie	Alliance		
David Parker	Labour Party	List MP 2005–present; MP since 2002; elected from party list	
Hessel van Wieren	Democrats for Social Credit		

=== Wellington Central ===
Incumbent Labour MP Marian Hobbs is retiring at the 2008 election, having served the seat since 1999.

Name	Party	Notes	Source
Michael Appleby	Aotearoa Legalise Cannabis Party	party leader	
Grant Brookes	Residents Action Movement		
Rebekah Clement	Kiwi Party		
Bernard Darnton	Libertarianz	party leader	
Don Franks	Workers Party		
Stephen Franks	National Party	Former ACT MP, 1999-05	
Justin Harnish	Republic of New Zealand		
Sue Kedgley	Green Party	list MP 1999–present; elected from party list	
Al Mansell	Independent		
Grant Robertson	Labour Party	winner	
Heather Roy	ACT	ACT party deputy leader; MP 2002–present; elected from party list	
Vaughan Smith	United Future		
David Somerset	Progressive Party		
Richard Wallis	Alliance		

=== West Coast-Tasman ===
Name	Party	Notes	Source
Chris Auchinvole	National Party	list MP 2005–present; winner	
Kevin Hague	Green Party	elected from party list	
Damien O'Connor	Labour Party	Incumbent 1996–08; MP 1993–2008; not re-elected	
Steve Richards	McGillicuddy Serious Party		
Jocelyn Smith	United Future		
Robert Terry	Aotearoa NZ Youth		
Reg Turner	Representative Party		
Steven Wilkinson	Aotearoa Legalise Cannabis Party		

=== Whanganui ===
Name	Party	Notes	Source
Chester Borrows	National Party	Incumbent since 2005; winner	
Alan Davidson	ACT		
Hamish McDouall	Labour Party		
John Milnes	Green Party		
Heather Smith	Democrats for Social Credit		

=== Whangarei ===
Name	Party	Notes	Source
Paul Chalmers	Labour Party	2005 candidate	
Paul Doherty	Green Party		
Ken Goodhue	Democrats for Social Credit		
Maureen Gunston	United Future		
Phil Heatley	National Party	incumbent, 1999–present, winner	
Don Hedges	Independent		
Helen Hughes	Libertarianz		
Martin Kaipo	Residents Action Movement		
Tom McLelland	ACT		
Viv Shepherd	Progressive Party		
Simon Vallings	Independent		

=== Wigram ===
Name	Party	Notes	Source
Marc Alexander	National Party	Former United Future MP, 2002–05	
Jim Anderton	Progressive Party	Incumbent MP 1996–present: MP since 1984, Progressive leader; winner	
Lindsay Cameron	Kiwi Party		
Steve Campbell	New Zealand First		
Tom Dowie	Alliance		
Erin Ebborn-Gillespie	Labour Party		
Matthew Gardiner	ACT		
Michael Hansen	Economic Euthenics		
Ben Morgan	Libertarianz		
John Ring	Democrats for Social Credit		
Vanessa Roberts	United Future		
Peter Taylor	Green Party		

== Māori electorates ==
=== Hauraki-Waikato ===
New seat replacing the old Tainui seat.

Name	Party	Notes	Source
Angeline Greensill	Māori Party	2005 candidate	
Nanaia Mahuta	Labour Party	MP for Tainui, 2005–08; MP since 1996; winner	

=== Ikaroa-Rāwhiti ===
Name	Party	Notes	Source
Derek Fox	Māori Party		
Parekura Horomia	Labour Party	Incumbent since 1999; winner	
Bevan Tipene	Green Party		

=== Tāmaki Makaurau ===
Name	Party	Notes	Source
Mikaere Curtis	Green Party		
Vapi Kupenga	Kiwi Party		
Marama Nathan	Independent		
Pita Sharples	Māori Party	incumbent since 2005; Māori Party co-leader; winner	
Kane Te Waaka	Independent		
Louisa Wall	Labour Party	list MP, 2008–present; not re-elected	

=== Te Tai Hauāuru ===
Name	Party	Notes	Source
Errol Mason	Labour Party		
Tariana Turia	Māori Party	incumbent since 1999; MP since 1996 (Labour 1996 – 2004); Māori Party co-leader; winner	

=== Te Tai Tokerau ===
Name	Party	Notes	Source
Judy Daniels	Aotearoa Legalise Cannabis Party		
Kelvin Davis	Labour Party	elected from party list	
Hone Harawira	Māori Party	incumbent 2005– ; winner	
David Rankin	Hapu Party		
Peter Tashkoff	ACT		

=== Te Tai Tonga ===
Name	Party	Notes	Source
Rahui Katene	Māori Party	winner	
Dora Roimata Langsbury	Green Party		
Mahara Okeroa	Labour Party	Incumbent since 1999; not re-elected	

=== Waiariki ===
Name	Party	Notes	Source
Te Ururoa Flavell	Māori Party	Incumbent since 2005; winner	
Mita Ririnui	Labour Party	List MP 2005–present; MP 1999–2005; elected from party list	

== See also ==
- 2008 New Zealand general election
- Opinion polling for the 2008 New Zealand general election
