= Party lists in the 2008 New Zealand general election =

New Zealand political candidates in the MMP era
Year	Party list	Candidates
1996	party lists	by electorate
1999	party lists	by electorate
2002	party lists	by electorate
2005	party lists	by electorate
2008	party lists	by electorate
2011	party lists	by electorate
2014	party lists	by electorate
2017	party lists	by electorate
2020	party lists	by electorate
2023	party lists	by electorate
2026	party lists	by electorate

This page provides the party lists put forward in New Zealand's 2008 general election. Party lists determine (in the light of country-wide proportional voting) the appointment of list MPs under the mixed-member proportional (MMP) representation electoral system. Electoral law required submission of all party lists for this particular election by 14 October 2008.

== Successful parties ==
=== ACT ===
Rank	Name	Incumbency	Contesting electorate	Previous rank	Change	Initial results	Later changes
1	Rodney Hide	Electorate	Epsom	1	0	✓ Won Epsom	
2	Heather Roy	List	Wellington Central	2	0	✓ Elected from list	
3	Roger Douglas	(Former MP)	Hunua	—	—	✓ Elected from list	
4	John Boscawen		North Shore	—	—	✓ Elected from list	
5	David Garrett		Helensville	—	—	✓ Elected from list	✗ Left parliament in 2010
6	Hilary Calvert		Dunedin North	—	—		✓ Replaced David Garrett in 2010
7	Peter Tashkoff		Te Tai Tokerau	—	—		
8	John Ormond		Napier	—	—		
9	Colin du Plessis		Ōhariu	—	—		
10	Shawn Tan		Mount Roskill	—	—		
11	Ron Scott		Tauranga	—	—		
12	Aaron Keown		Waimakariri	—	—		
13	Nick Kearney		Northcote	51	+38		
14	Lyn Murphy		Manukau East	—	—		
15	David Olsen			14	-1		
16	Frances Denz		Bay of Plenty	28	+12		
17	Dave Moore			—	—		
18	Mike Bridge		Rongotai	—	—		
19	Lech Beltowski		Te Atatū	18	-1		
20	Beryl Good		Rodney	—	—		
21	Dave Tattersfield		Kaikōura	—	—		
22	John Thompson		Papakura	—	—		
23	Kevin Campbell			—	—		
24	Mark Davies		Waikato	52	+28		
25	Michael Bailey		Manurewa	—	—		
26	Carl Freimann			—	—		
27	Chris Albers		New Plymouth	—	—		
28	Vince Ashworth			—	—		
29	Shane Atkinson		Wairarapa	—	—		
30	Ray Bassett		Coromandel	54	+24		
31	Mike Collins		Mana	32	+1		
32	Alan Davidson		Whanganui	—	—		
33	Andrew Falloon			34	+1		
34	Matthew Gardiner		Wigram	—	—		
35	Roly Henderson		Clutha-Southland	—	—		
36	Ted Howard			—	—		
37	Bill Izard		Taranaki-King Country	—	—		
38	Duncan Lennox		Tukituki	—	—		
39	Garry Mallett		Hamilton East	59	+20		
40	Stephen Martin			—	—		
41	Patricia Martin			—	—		
42	Kathleen McCabe		Mount Albert	—	—		
43	Peter McCaffrey		Ōtaki	—	—		
44	Tom McClelland		Whangarei	—	—		
45	Athol McQuilkan		Maungakiekie	—	—		
46	Rayneil Narsey			—	—		
47	Colin Nicholls		Dunedin South	—	—		
48	Jon Olsen			—	—		
49	Ian Parker		Hamilton West	—	—		
50	James Read			—	—		
51	John Riddell		Waitakere	43	-8		
52	Geoff Russell		Port Hills	—	—		
53	Chris Simmons		Tāmaki	—	—		
54	Toni Severin		Christchurch Central	—	—		
55	David Seymour			55	0		
56	Michael Tabachnik		Māngere	—	—		
57	Michael Tasker		New Lynn	—	—		
58	Jean Thompson-Church			—	—		
59	Graeme Tulloch			—	—		
60	Scott Uren		Auckland Central	—	—		
61	John Fraser		Waitaki	27	-34		

Sources: Elections New Zealand. Party Lists of Successful Registered Parties (2008), Party Lists of Successful Registered Parties (2005), Electorate Candidate and Party Votes Recorded at Each Polling Place (2008)

=== Green Party ===
Rank	Name	Incumbency	Contesting electorate	Previous rank	Change	Initial results	Later changes
1	Jeanette Fitzsimons	List		1	0	✓ Elected from list	✗ Left parliament in 2010
2	Russel Norman	List	Rongotai	10	+8	✓ Elected from list	
3	Sue Bradford	List	East Coast Bays	3	0	✓ Elected from list	✗ Left parliament in 2009
4	Metiria Turei	List	Dunedin North	6	+2	✓ Elected from list	
5	Sue Kedgley	List	Wellington Central	4	-1	✓ Elected from list	
6	Keith Locke	List	Epsom	5	-1	✓ Elected from list	
7	Kevin Hague		West Coast-Tasman	—	—	✓ Elected from list	
8	Catherine Delahunty		East Coast	9	+1	✓ Elected from list	
9	Kennedy Graham		Ilam	—	—	✓ Elected from list	
10	David Clendon		Helensville	12	+2		✓ Replaced Sue Bradford in 2009
11	Gareth Hughes		Ōhariu	—	—		✓ Replaced Jeanette Fitzsimons in 2010
12	Steffan Browning		Kaikōura	11	-1		
13	Mojo Mathers		Christchurch East	16	+3		
14	Mike Ward	(Former MP)		8	-6		
15	Quentin Duthie		Tukituki	—	—		
16	Mikaere Curtis		Tāmaki Makaurau	17	+1		
17	Rick Leckinger		Tāmaki	—	—		
18	Jeanette Elley		Northcote	19	+1		
19	Virginia Horrocks		Hutt South	—	—		
20	Donna Wynd		Manukau East	—	—		
21	David Hay		Rodney	—	—		
22	Diana Mellor		Nelson	—	—		
23	James Redwood		Coromandel	—	—		
24	Lisa Er		Mount Roskill	—	—		
25	Jan McLauchlan		Christchurch Central	—	—		
26	Lizzie Gillett			—	—		
27	Rayna Fahey			—	—		
28	Craig Carson		Invercargill	29	+1		
29	Richard Tindall			—	—		
30	Paul Doherty		Whangarei	—	—		
31	Michael Woodcock		Wairarapa	—	—		
32	Pieter Watson		North Shore	—	—		
33	Lynette Vigrass		Rimutaka	—	—		
34	Bevan Tipene		Ikaroa-Rāwhiti	—	—		
35	Peter Taylor		Wigram	—	—		
36	Karen Summerhays		Tauranga	—	—		
37	Mua Strickson-Pua		Māngere	20	-17		
38	Gary Stewart		Waitakere	—	—		
39	Dale Stevens		Hamilton West	—	—		
40	Brett Stansfield		Napier	—	—		
41	James Shaw			—	—		
42	Raewyn Saville		Rotorua	54	+12		
43	Denise Roche		Auckland Central	—	—		
44	Rebecca Redwood			—	—		
45	Linda Persson		Hamilton East	—	—		
46	David Broughton		Hamilton East	—	—		
47	Lawrence O'Halloran		Palmerston North	—	—		
48	John Milnes		Whanganui	49	+1		
49	Alan Liefting		Waimakariri	47	-2		
50	Martin Leiding		Northland	—	—		
51	Dora Langsbury		Te Tai Tonga	—	—		
52	Fiona Kenworthy		Hunua	—	—		
53	James Kebbell		Ōtaki	—	—		
54	Alan Johnson		Manurewa	—	—		
55	Wendy Harper		Waikato	—	—		
56	Rob Hamill		Taranaki-King Country	—	—		
57	Rachel Grimwood		Papakura	—	—		
58	Timothy Gow		Clutha-Southland	—	—		
59	Xavier Goldie		Te Atatū	—	—		
60	Michael Gilchrist		Mana	—	—		
61	Ryan Garland			—	—		
62	Shane Gallagher		Dunedin South	—	—		
63	Zachery Dorner		Pakuranga	—	—		
64	Katherine Dewar		New Lynn	37	-27		
65	Peter Cooper		Botany	—	—		
66	Joseph Burston		Port Hills	—	—		
67	Oliver Briggs		Waitaki	—	—		

Sources: Elections New Zealand. Party Lists of Successful Registered Parties (2008), Party Lists of Successful Registered Parties (2005), Electorate Candidate and Party Votes Recorded at Each Polling Place (2008)

=== Labour Party ===
Rank	Name	Incumbency	Contesting electorate	Previous rank	Change	Initial results	Later changes
1	Helen Clark	Electorate	Mount Albert	1	0	✓ Won Mount Albert	✗ Left parliament in 2009
2	Michael Cullen	List		2	0	✓ Elected from list	✗ Left parliament in 2009
3	Phil Goff	Electorate	Mount Roskill	6	+3	✓ Won Mount Roskill	
4	Annette King	Electorate	Rongotai	7	+3	✓ Won Rongotai	
5	Parekura Horomia	Electorate	Ikaroa-Rawhiti	5	0	✓ Won Ikaroa-Rawhiti	
6	Pete Hodgson	Electorate	Dunedin North	12	+6	✓ Won Dunedin North	
7	Chris Carter	Electorate	Te Atatū	19	+12	✓ Won Te Atatū	
8	David Cunliffe	Electorate	New Lynn	31	+23	✓ Won New Lynn	
9	Maryan Street	List	Nelson	36	+27	✓ Elected from list	
10	Nanaia Mahuta	Electorate	Tainui	—	—	✓ Won Tainui	
11	Winnie Laban	Electorate	Mana	20	+9	✓ Won Mana	✗ Left parliament in 2010
12	Rajen Prasad			—	—	✓ Elected from list	
13	Ruth Dyson	Electorate	Port Hills	14	+1	✓ Won Port Hills	
14	Trevor Mallard	Electorate	Hutt South	8	-6	✓ Won Hutt South	
15	Lianne Dalziel	Electorate	Christchurch East	26	+11	✓ Won Christchurch East	
16	Shane Jones	List	Northland	27	+11	✓ Elected from list	
17	David Parker	List	Waitaki	37	+20	✓ Elected from list	
18	Clayton Cosgrove	Electorate	Waimakariri	—	—	✓ Won Waimakariri	
19	Darren Hughes	Electorate	Otaki	34	+15	✓ Elected from list	✗ Left parliament in 2011
20	Jacinda Ardern		Waikato	—	—	✓ Elected from list	
21	Raymond Huo			—	—	✓ Elected from list	
22	Sue Moroney	List	Hamilton East	42	+20	✓ Elected from list	
23	Mita Ririnui	List	Waiariki	15	-8	✓ Elected from list	
24	William Sio	List	Mangere	47	+23	✓ Won Mangere	
25	Moana Mackey	List	East Coast	41	+16	✓ Elected from list	
26	Phil Twyford		North Shore	55	+29	✓ Elected from list	
27	Charles Chauvel	List	Ohariu	44	+17	✓ Elected from list	
28	Carol Beaumont		Maungakiekie	—	—	✓ Elected from list	
29	Kelvin Davis		Te Tai Tokerau	—	—	✓ Elected from list	
30	Steve Chadwick	Electorate	Rotorua	33	+3	✓ Elected from list	
31	Ashraf Choudhary	List		25	-6	✓ Elected from list	
32	Lynne Pillay	Electorate	Waitakere	40	+8	✓ Elected from list	
33	Darien Fenton	List	Helensville	43	+10	✓ Elected from list	
34	Rick Barker	List	Tukituki	21	-13	✓ Elected from list	
35	Carmel Sepuloni			—	—	✓ Elected from list	
36	Stuart Nash			60	+24	✓ Elected from list	
37	Damien O'Connor	Electorate	West Coast-Tasman	—	—	✗ Lost seat	✓ Replaced Michael Cullen in 2009
38	Judith Tizard	Electorate	Auckland Central	18	-20	✗ Lost seat	
39	Mark Burton	Electorate	Taupo	16	-23	✗ Lost seat	
40	Mahara Okeroa	Electorate	Te Tai Tonga	22	-18	✗ Lost seat	
41	Martin Gallagher	Electorate	Hamilton West	32	-9	✗ Lost seat	
42	Dave Hereora	List	Papakura	39	-3	✗ Lost seat	
43	Louisa Wall	List	Tāmaki Makaurau	46	+3	✗ Lost seat	✓ Replaced Darren Hughes in 2011
44	Lesley Soper	List	Invercargill	45	+1	✗ Lost seat	
45	Clare Curran		Dunedin South	—	—	✓ Won Dunedin South	
46	Grant Robertson		Wellington Central	—	—	✓ Won Wellington Central	
47	Chris Hipkins		Rimutaka	—	—	✓ Won Rimutaka	
48	Iain Lees-Galloway		Palmerston North	—	—	✓ Won Palmerston North	
49	Brendon Burns		Christchurch Central	48	-1	✓ Won Christchurch Central	
50	Hamish McCracken		Northcote	49	-1		
51	Erin Ebborn-Gillespie		Wigram	69	+18		
52	Errol Mason		Te Tai Hauāuru	—	—		
53	Chris Yoo			57	+4		
54	Josephine Bartley		Tāmaki	—	—		
55	Don Pryde		Clutha-Southland	—	—		
56	Michael Wood			58	+2		
57	Farida Sultana			—	—		
58	Denise Mackenzie		Wairarapa	50	-8		
59	Julian Blanchard		Rangitata	—	—		
60	Hamish McDouall		Whanganui	—	—		
61	Anjum Rahman			64	+3		
62	Susan Zhu			—	—		
63	Kate Sutton		Epsom	—	—		
64	Conor Roberts		Rodney	—	—		
65	Koro Tawa		Botany	—	—		
66	Jills Angus-Burney		Rangitīkei	—	—		
67	Vivienne Goldsmith		East Coast Bays	—	—		
68	Eamon Daly			65	-3		
69	Brian Kelly		Pakuranga	—	—		
70	Jordan Carter		Hunua	—	—		
71	Tracy Dorreen			—	—		
72	Renee van de Weert		Taranaki-King Country	—	—		
73	Anne Pankhurst		Tauranga	—	—		
74	David Coates		Selwyn	—	—		
75	Hugh Kininmonth		Coromandel	—	—		
76	Carol Devoy-Heena		Bay of Plenty	—	—		
77	Raj Thandi			—	—		

Sources: Elections New Zealand. Party Lists of Successful Registered Parties (2008), Party Lists of Successful Registered Parties (2005), Electorate Candidate and Party Votes Recorded at Each Polling Place (2008)

=== Māori Party ===
Rank	Name	Incumbency	Contesting electorate	Previous rank	Change	Initial results	Later changes
1	Tariana Turia	Electorate	Te Tai Hauāuru	1	0	✓ Won Te Tai Hauāuru	
2	Pita Sharples	Electorate	Tāmaki Makaurau	2	0	✓ Won Tāmaki Makaurau	
3	Hone Harawira	Electorate	Te Tai Tokerau	—	—	✓ Won Te Tai Tokerau	
4	Te Ururoa Flavell	Electorate	Waiariki	10	+6	✓ Won Waiariki	
5	Angeline Greensill		Hauraki-Waikato	9	+4		
6	Derek Fox		Ikaroa-Rāwhiti	—	—		
7	Rahui Katene		Te Tai Tonga	—	—	✓ Won Te Tai Tonga	
8	Naida Glavish			—	—		
9	Iritana Tāwhiwhirangi			—	—		
10	Hector Matthews			—	—		
11	Te Orohi Paul			13	+2		
12	Amokura Panoho			—	—		
13	Grant Hawke			—	—		
14	Bronwyn Yates			14	0		
15	Josie Peita			21	+6		
16	Richard Orzecki			32	+16		
17	Mereana Pitman			—	—		
18	Te Awanuiarangi Black			—	—		
19	Georgina Haremate-Crawford			40	+21		

Sources: Elections New Zealand. Party Lists of Successful Registered Parties (2008), Party Lists of Successful Registered Parties (2005), Electorate Candidate and Party Votes Recorded at Each Polling Place (2008)

=== National Party ===
Rank	Name	Incumbency	Contesting electorate	Previous rank	Change	Initial results	Later changes
1	John Key	Electorate	Helensville	7	+6	✓ Won Helensville	
2	Bill English	Electorate	Clutha-Southland	4	+2	✓ Won Clutha-Southland	
3	Gerry Brownlee	Electorate	Ilam	2	-1	✓ Won Ilam	
4	Simon Power	Electorate	Rangitīkei	3	-1	✓ Won Rangitīkei	
5	Nick Smith	Electorate	Nelson	5	0	✓ Won Nelson	
6	Tony Ryall	Electorate	Bay of Plenty	6	0	✓ Won Bay of Plenty	
7	Judith Collins	Electorate	Papakura	12	+5	✓ Won Papakura	
8	Maurice Williamson	Electorate	Pakuranga	17	+9	✓ Won Pakuranga	
9	David Carter	List		8	-1	✓ Elected from list	
10	Anne Tolley	Electorate	East Coast	43	+33	✓ Won East Coast	
11	Murray McCully	Electorate	East Coast Bays	11	0	✓ Won East Coast Bays	
12	Lockwood Smith	Electorate	Rodney	9	-3	✓ Won Rodney	
13	Wayne Mapp	Electorate	North Shore	14	+1	✓ Won North Shore	
14	Chris Finlayson	List	Rongotai	27	+13	✓ Elected from list	
15	Tim Groser	List	New Lynn	13	-2	✓ Elected from list	
16	Steven Joyce			—	—	✓ Elected from list	
17	Georgina te Heuheu	List		19	+2	✓ Elected from list	
18	Nathan Guy	List	Ōtaki	39	+21	✓ Won Ōtaki	
19	Lindsay Tisch	Electorate	Waikato	24	+5	✓ Won Waikato	
20	Pansy Wong	List	Botany	20	0	✓ Won Botany	
21	John Carter	Electorate	Northland	15	-6	✓ Won Northland	✗ Left parliament in 2011
22	Phil Heatley	Electorate	Whangarei	22	0	✓ Won Whangarei	
23	Paul Hutchison	Electorate	Hunua	23	0	✓ Won Hunua	
24	Shane Ardern	Electorate	Taranaki-King Country	21	-3	✓ Won Taranaki-King Country	
25	Richard Worth	List	Epsom	16	-9	✓ Elected from list	✗ Left parliament in 2009
26	Tau Henare	List	Te Atatū	29	+3	✓ Elected from list	
27	Sandra Goudie	Electorate	Coromandel	26	-1	✓ Won Coromandel	
28	Eric Roy	Electorate	Invercargill	37	+9	✓ Won Invercargill	
29	Jonathan Coleman	Electorate	Northcote	35	+6	✓ Won Northcote	
30	Kate Wilkinson	List	Waimakariri	38	+8	✓ Elected from list	
31	Chris Tremain	Electorate	Napier	52	+21	✓ Won Napier	
32	Chester Borrows	Electorate	Whanganui	33	+1	✓ Won Whanganui	
33	Craig Foss	Electorate	Tukituki	44	+11	✓ Won Tukituki	
34	Allan Peachey	Electorate	Tāmaki	30	-4	✓ Won Tāmaki	✗ Died in 2011
35	Sam Lotu-Iiga		Maungakiekie	—	—	✓ Won Maungakiekie	
36	Hekia Parata		Mana	—	—	✓ Elected from list	
37	Melissa Lee			—	—	✓ Elected from list	
38	Kanwal Singh Bakshi		Manukau East	—	—	✓ Elected from list	
39	Jo Goodhew	Electorate	Rangitata	31	-8	✓ Won Rangitata	
40	Jacqui Dean	Electorate	Waitaki	40	0	✓ Won Waitaki	
41	Paula Bennett	List	Waitakere	45	+4	✓ Won Waitakere	
42	Chris Auchinvole	List	West Coast-Tasman	34	-8	✓ Won West Coast-Tasman	
43	Nicky Wagner	List	Christchurch Central	28	-15	✓ Elected from list	
44	David Bennett	Electorate	Hamilton East	32	-12	✓ Won Hamilton East	
45	Jackie Blue	List	Mount Roskill	41	-4	✓ Elected from list	
46	Katrina Shanks	List	Ōhariu	46	0	✓ Elected from list	
47	Colin King	Electorate	Kaikōura	42	-5	✓ Won Kaikōura	
48	Paul Quinn		Hutt South	—	—	✓ Elected from list	
49	Michael Woodhouse		Dunedin North	—	—	✓ Elected from list	
50	John Hayes	Electorate	Wairarapa	50	0	✓ Won Wairarapa	
51	Simon Bridges		Tauranga	—	—	✓ Won Tauranga	
52	Amy Adams		Selwyn	—	—	✓ Won Selwyn	
53	Louise Upston		Taupō	—	—	✓ Won Taupō	
54	Todd McClay		Rotorua	—	—	✓ Won Rotorua	
55	Tim Macindoe		Hamilton West	62	+7	✓ Won Hamilton West	
56	Aaron Gilmore		Christchurch East	—	—	✓ Elected from list	
57	Nikki Kaye		Auckland Central	—	—	✓ Won Auckland Central	
58	Cam Calder		Manurewa	—	—		✓ Replaced Richard Worth in 2009
59	Conway Powell		Dunedin South	55	-4		
60	Stephen Franks	(Former MP)	Wellington Central	(ACT: 4)	-56		
61	Marc Alexander	(Former MP)	Wigram	(United Future: 4)	-57		
62	Malcolm Plimmer		Palmerston North	60	-2		
63	Mita Harris		Māngere	53	-10		
64	Terry Heffernan		Port Hills	—	—		
65	Ravi Musuku		Mount Albert	48	-17		
66	Jonathan Young		New Plymouth	—	—	✓ Won New Plymouth	
67	Richard Whiteside		Rimutaka	—	—		
68	Paul O'Brien			—	—		
69	Youngshin Watkins			—	—		
70	Viv Gurrey			—	—		
71	Dugald McLean			—	—		
72	Simon O'Connor			—	—		

Sources: Elections New Zealand. Party Lists of Successful Registered Parties (2008), Party Lists of Successful Registered Parties (2005), Electorate Candidate and Party Votes Recorded at Each Polling Place (2008)

=== Progressive Party ===
Rank	Name	Incumbency	Contesting electorate	Previous rank	Change	Initial results	Later changes
1	Jim Anderton	Electorate	Wigram	1	0	✓ Won Wigram	
2	Matt Robson	(Former MP)	Maungakiekie	2	0		
3	Josie Pagani		Ōtaki	—	—		
4	Paula Gillon			13	+9		
5	Phil Clearwater		Port Hills	14	+9		
6	Viv Shepherd		Whangarei	7	+1		
7	Trevor Barnard		Manukau East	15	+8		
8	Brenda Hill		Northcote	17	+9		
9	Craig Hutchinson		Ilam	—	—		
10	Justin Robson		Auckland Central	—	—		
11	Jeffrey Ly		Pakuranga	—	—		
12	Suki Amirapu		Mount Roskill	27	+15		
13	Somnath Bagchi		Christchurch Central	—	—		
14	Sukhdev Bains		Manurewa	29	+15		
15	Racheal Cheam		Botany	—	—		
16	Mohammad Kazemi-Yazdi		New Lynn	22	+6		
17	Debbie Lucas		Palmerston North	—	—		
18	Claire Main		Waitaki	35	+17		
19	Phillipa Main		Selwyn	36	+17		
20	John Maurice		Rimutaka	21	+1		
21	Jacqui McAlpine		Dunedin South	37	+16		
22	Dawn Patchett		Tukituki	41	+19		
23	Tala Po'e		Māngere	42	+19		
24	Pavitra Roy		Te Atatū	43	+19		
25	Elspeth Sandys		Christchurch East	44	+19		
26	David Somerset		Wellington Central	48	+22		
27	Ralph Taylor		Tāmaki	—	—		

Sources: Elections New Zealand. Party Lists of Successful Registered Parties (2008), Party Lists of Successful Registered Parties (2005), Electorate Candidate and Party Votes Recorded at Each Polling Place (2008)

=== United Future ===
Rank	Name	Incumbency	Contesting electorate	Previous rank	Change	Initial results	Later changes
1	Peter Dunne	Electorate	Ōhariu	1	0	✓ Won Ōhariu	
2	Judy Turner	List	East Coast	2	0	✗ Lost seat	
3	Denise Krum		Maungakiekie	—	—		
4	Graeme Reeves	(Former MP)	Wairarapa	10	+6		
5	Pulotu Selio Solomon		Māngere	—	—		
6	Murray Smith	(Former MP)	Hutt South	6	0		
7	Neville Wilson		Mount Roskill	14	+7		
8	Frank Owen		Palmerston North	—	—		
9	Janet Tuck		Epsom	8	-1		
10	Karuna Muthu		Rongotai	—	—		
11	Robin Loomes		Port Hills	27	+16		
12	Greg Graydon		Tāmaki	30	+18		
13	Damian Light		North Shore	—	—		
14	Vanessa Roberts		Wigram	25	+11		
15	Aaron Galey-Young		Auckland Central	—	—		
16	Ian McInnes		East Coast Bays	17	+1		
17	Kelleigh Sheffield-Cranstoun		Waimakariri	—	—		
18	Brian Ward		Rangitata	—	—		
19	Vaughan Smith		Wellington Central	—	—		
20	Jim Stowers		Manurewa	—	—		
21	Bryan Mockridge		Papakura	—	—		
22	Arthur Solomon		Rotorua	—	—		
23	Jenni Hurn		Rimutaka	—	—		
24	Manogi Turua Head		Manukau East	—	—		
25	Dianne Brown		Ōtaki	38	+13		
26	Quentin Todd		Pakuranga	—	—		
27	Rochelle White		Hamilton East	—	—		
28	John Langford		Rangitīkei	—	—		
29	Philip Johnson			—	—		
30	Kenneth Smith			—	—		

Sources: Elections New Zealand. Party Lists of Successful Registered Parties (2008), Party Lists of Successful Registered Parties (2005), Electorate Candidate and Party Votes Recorded at Each Polling Place (2008)

== Unsuccessful parties ==
=== Alliance ===
Rank	Name	Incumbency	Contesting electorate	Previous rank	Change	Initial results	Later changes
1	Kay Murray		Dunedin South	—	—		
2	Andrew McKenzie		Port Hills	3	+1		
3	Victor Billot		Dunedin North	8	+5		
4	Paul Piesse		Christchurch East	2	-2		
5	Richard Wallis		Wellington Central	—	—		
6	Sarah Campbell			—	—		
7	Bob van Ruyssevelt		Te Atatū	10	+3		
8	Jim Flynn			7	-1		
9	Sarita Davis		Auckland Central	—	—		
10	Amy Tubman		Wairarapa	—	—		
11	Richard Mitchell			—	—		
12	Jack Yan			—	—		
13	Tom Dowie		Wigram	11	-2		
14	Thomas O’Neill		Tukituki	—	—		
15	Kelly Buchanan		Ōhariu	14	-1		
16	Jen Olsen			—	—		
17	Greg Kleis		Christchurch Central	18	+1		
18	Matthew Stephen			—	—		
19	Marvin Hubbard		Clutha-Southland	23	+4		
20	Norm MacRitchie		Waitaki	25	+5		
21	Sandra Ethell		Waitakere	19	-2		
22	Justin Wilson			—	—		
23	Quentin Findlay			13	-10		
24	Val Quinn			—	—		
25	Sarah Martin			—	—		
26	Peta Knibb			22	-4		
27	Warren Brewer			—	—		
28	Denis O’Connor			—	—		
29	Eric Gamble			26	-3		
30	Samuel Murray			—	—		

Sources: Elections New Zealand. Party Lists of Unsuccessful Registered Parties (2008), Party Lists of Unsuccessful Registered Parties (2005), Electorate Candidate and Party Votes Recorded at Each Polling Place (2008)

=== Bill and Ben Party ===
Rank	Name	Incumbency	Contesting electorate	Previous rank	Change	Initial results	Later changes
1	Jamie "Bill" Linehan			—	—		
2	Ben Boyce			—	—		

Sources: Elections New Zealand. Party Lists of Unsuccessful Registered Parties (2008), Electorate Candidate and Party Votes Recorded at Each Polling Place (2008)

=== Democrats for Social Credit ===
Rank	Name	Incumbency	Contesting electorate	Previous rank	Change	Initial results	Later changes
1	Stephnie de Ruyter			1	0		
2	John Pemberton		Waikato	2	0		
3	David Wilson		Northland	3	0		
4	Katherine Ransom		Tauranga	6	+2		
5	Carolyn McKenzie			—	—		
6	David Tranter			10	+4		
7	Heather M. Smith		Whanganui	9	+2		
8	Hessel van Wieren		Waitaki	25	+17		
9	Barry Pulford		Tukituki	24	+15		
10	Dawn McIntosh		Dunedin South	—	—		
11	Iain Parker		Taranaki-King Country	—	—		
12	Nick McIlraith		Christchurch East	—	—		
13	Ken Goodhue		Whangarei	11	-2		
14	John McCaskey		Kaikōura	—	—		
15	John Ring		Wigram	—	—		
16	Les Port			—	—		
17	Bruce Stirling			16	-1		
18	Ross Weddell			13	-5		
19	Kelly Pemberton		Waikato	19	0		
20	David Espin			14	-6		
21	Ross Hayward			15	-6		
22	John Steemson			5	-17		
23	Karl Hewlett			17	-6		
24	Bob Fox			27	+3		
25	Malcolm Keoghan			—	—		
26	John Kilbride			7	-19		
27	Harry Alchin-Smith			—	—		
28	Alida Steemson			26	-2		
29	Roger White			—	—		
30	Garry Gribben			—	—		
31	Olive McRae			—	—		

Sources: Elections New Zealand. Party Lists of Unsuccessful Registered Parties (2008), Party Lists of Unsuccessful Registered Parties (2005), Electorate Candidate and Party Votes Recorded at Each Polling Place (2008)

=== Family Party ===
Rank	Name	Incumbency	Contesting electorate	Previous rank	Change	Initial results	Later changes
1	Richard Lewis		Manurewa	(Destiny: 1)	0		
2	Paul Adams	(Former MP)	East Coast Bays	—	—		
3	Angela Xu		Northcote	—	—		
4	George Ngatai			—	—		
5	Pailate Poutoa Papali’i		Manukau East	—	—		
6	Samuel Dennis		Selwyn	—	—		
7	Michael Kidd		Waitakere	—	—		
8	Melanie Taylor		Northland	—	—		
9	Karl Adams		Rodney	—	—		
10	Louise Cleary		North Shore	—	—		
11	Paul Tankard		Clutha-Southland	—	—		
12	Yih Woh Chong			—	—		
13	Elias Kanaris			—	—		
14	Jerry Filipaina		Māngere	—	—		

Sources: Elections New Zealand. Party Lists of Unsuccessful Registered Parties (2008), Electorate Candidate and Party Votes Recorded at Each Polling Place (2008)

=== Kiwi Party ===
Rank	Name	Incumbency	Contesting electorate	Previous rank	Change	Initial results	Later changes
1	Larry Baldock	(Former MP)	Tauranga	(United Future: 5)	+4		
2	Gordon Copeland	List	Rongotai	(United Future: 3)	+1	✗ Lost seat	
3	Simon Kan		Botany	—	—		
4	Frank Naea		Hunua	—	—		
5	Simonne Dyer		Rodney	—	—		
6	Bernie Ogilvy	(Former MP)	Maungakiekie	(United Future: 9)	+3		
7	Tony Christiansen		Bay of Plenty	—	—		
8	Tony Bunting		Rangitata	—	—		
9	Vapi Kupenga		Tāmaki Makaurau	—	—		
10	Leighton Baker		Waimakariri	—	—		
11	Camilla Chin		Hutt South	—	—		
12	Kevin Stitt		Manukau East	—	—		
13	Robyn Jackson		Hamilton East	(United Future: 28)	+15		
14	Jo van Kempen		Te Atatū	—	—		
15	Marjorie Mulholland			—	—		
16	Joel Sison		Ōhariu	—	—		
17	Grace Haden		Epsom	—	—		
18	Joseph Rebello		Mount Roskill	—	—		
19	Robin Westley		Nelson	(United Future: 34)	+15		
20	Rebekah Clement		Wellington Central	—	—		
21	Alastair Belcher		Kaikōura	—	—		
22	Amjad Khan		Manurewa	—	—		
23	Lindsay Cameron		Wigram	—	—		
24	Philip Wescombe		Dunedin South	—	—		
25	Christian Dawson		Mount Albert	—	—		

Sources: Elections New Zealand. Party Lists of Unsuccessful Registered Parties (2008), Electorate Candidate and Party Votes Recorded at Each Polling Place (2008)

=== Legalise Cannabis Party ===
Rank	Name	Incumbency	Contesting electorate	Previous rank	Change	Initial results	Later changes
1	Michael Appleby		Wellington Central	1	0		
2	Michael Britnell		Christchurch Central	2	0		
3	Paula Lambert			4	+1		
4	Kevin O'Connell		Auckland Central	6	+2		
5	Juilan Crawford		Dunedin North	—	—		
6	Irinka Britnell			5	-1		
7	Steven Willkinson		West Coast-Tasman	8	+1		
8	Judy Daniels		Te Tai Tokerau	3	-5		
9	Vince McLeod			—	—		
10	Danyl Strype		Ōhariu	—	—		
11	Paul McMullan			7	-4		
12	Jeff Lye			—	—		
13	Philip Pophristoff			13	0		
14	Jason Baker-Sherman			10	-4		
15	Judy Matangi			9	-6		
16	Neville Yates			12	-4		
17	Elanor Stedman			—	—		
18	Peter Green			11	-7		
19	Mark Bradford			—	—		
20	Fred MacDonald			—	—		

Sources: Elections New Zealand. Party Lists of Unsuccessful Registered Parties (2008), Party Lists of Unsuccessful Registered Parties (2005), Electorate Candidate and Party Votes Recorded at Each Polling Place (2008)

=== Libertarianz ===
Rank	Name	Incumbency	Contesting electorate	Previous rank	Change	Initial results	Later changes
1	Bernard Darnton		Wellington Central	1	0		
2	Richard McGrath		Wairarapa	2	0		
3	Susan Ryder			4	+1		
4	Mitch Lees		Rongotai	—	—		
5	Colin Cross			6	+1		
6	Peter Cresswell			5	-1		
7	Peter Linton		Northcote	9	+2		
8	Phil Howison		Hutt South	12	+4		
9	Nik Haden			24	+15		
10	Tim Wikiriwhi		Hamilton West	3	-7		
11	Mike Webber		New Plymouth	10	-1		
12	Elah Zamora		East Coast Bays	—	—		
13	Helen Hughes		Whangarei	7	-6		
14	Michael Murphy		North Shore	13	-1		
15	Peter Osborne		Helensville	19	+4		
16	Sean Fitzpatrick			—	—		
17	Scott Wilson			—	—		
18	Luke Howison			17	-1		
19	Ben Morgan		Wigram	—	—		
20	Shane Pleasance		Invercargill	—	—		
21	Robert Palmer			28	+7		
22	Shirley Riddle			—	—		
23	Bruce Whitehead		Hunua	—	—		
24	Terry Verhoeven			25	+1		
25	Ken Riddle			27	+2		
26	Fred Stevens		Rotorua	—	—		
27	Euan McPetrie			—	—		
28	Chris Robertson			18	-10		
29	Peter Kermode			—	—		
30	Andrew Couper			—	—		
31	Don Rowberry			21	-10		
32	Willem Verhoeven			22	-10		
33	Mark Hubbard			—	—		
34	Sean Kimpton			—	—		
35	Julian Darby			—	—		
36	Richard Goode		Mana	16	-20		

Sources: Elections New Zealand. Party Lists of Unsuccessful Registered Parties (2008), Party Lists of Unsuccessful Registered Parties (2005), Electorate Candidate and Party Votes Recorded at Each Polling Place (2008)

=== New Zealand First ===
Rank	Name	Incumbency	Contesting electorate	Previous rank	Change	Initial results	Later changes
1	Winston Peters	List	Tauranga	1	0	✗ Lost seat	
2	Peter Brown	List	Bay of Plenty	2	0	✗ Lost seat	
3	Ron Mark	List	Rimutaka	4	+1	✗ Lost seat	
4	Doug Woolerton	List	Hamilton East	5	+1	✗ Lost seat	
5	Barbara Stewart	List	Waikato	6	+1	✗ Lost seat	
6	Pita Paraone	List	Pakuranga	7	+1	✗ Lost seat	
7	Asenati Lole-Taylor		Maungakiekie	—	—		
8	Edwin Perry	(Former MP)	Wairarapa	12	+4		
9	Steve Campbell		Wigram	—	—		
10	Brendan Horan		East Coast	—	—		
11	Melanie Mark-Shadbolt		Waimakariri	—	—		
12	David Scott		Ōtaki	—	—		
13	Tracey Martin		Rodney	—	—		
14	Dail Jones	List	East Coast Bays	10	-4	✗ Lost seat	
15	Brent Catchpole	(Former MP)	Papakura	14	-1		
16	Helen Mulford		Hunua	—	—		
17	Craig McNair	(Former MP)	Waitakere	11	-6		
18	Joe Gregory		North Shore	—	—		
19	Doug Nabbs		Tāmaki	—	—		
20	John Hall		Manurewa	—	—		
21	Graham Odering		Palmerston North	40	+19		
22	Linda King		Kaikōura	—	—		

Sources: Elections New Zealand. Party Lists of Unsuccessful Registered Parties (2008), Party Lists of Successful Registered Parties (2005), Electorate Candidate and Party Votes Recorded at Each Polling Place (2008)

=== Pacific Party ===
Rank	Name	Incumbency	Contesting electorate	Previous rank	Change	Initial results	Later changes
1	Taito Phillip Field	Electorate	Māngere	(Labour: 13)	+12	✗ Lost seat	
2	Milo Siilata		Mount Albert	—	—		
3	Matapakia Ngaroi			—	—		
4	Aiolupotea Roache			—	—		
5	Darren Jones		Maungakiekie	—	—		
6	Galumalemana Hunkin			—	—		
7	Fia Misa Tupou		Waitakere	—	—		
8	Tevaga Leavasa		Manukau East	—	—		
9	Vui K Sapa'u Vitale		Manurewa	—	—		
10	Tiumalumatua Fetu			—	—		
11	Lupe Tofilau Eti-Vaofanua			—	—		
12	Craig Jones			—	—		
13	Fiasili Ah Tong		Te Atatū	—	—		
14	Tim Manu		Mana	—	—		

Sources: Elections New Zealand. Party Lists of Successful Registered Parties (2008), Electorate Candidate and Party Votes Recorded at Each Polling Place (2008)

=== Residents Action Movement ===
Rank	Name	Incumbency	Contesting electorate	Previous rank	Change	Initial results	Later changes
1	Oliver Woods		Auckland Central	—	—		
2	Grant Brookes		Wellington Central	—	—		
3	Roger Fowler		Māngere	—	—		
4	Elliott Blade		Maungakiekie	—	—		
5	Michelle Ducat			—	—		
6	Martin Kaipo		Whangarei	—	—		
7	Cordelia Black			—	—		
8	Stephen Cooper		North Shore	—	—		
9	Daphne Lawless		Mount Roskill	—	—		
10	Grant Rogers		Rotorua	—	—		
11	Don Archer			—	—		
12	Pat O'Dea		Papakura	—	—		
13	Bronwen Beechey			—	—		
14	Robyn Hughes			—	—		
15	Benjamin Doherty		Northcote	—	—		
16	Rafe Copeland		Epsom	—	—		
17	Michael Lai			—	—		
18	Curwen Rolinson			—	—		
19	Peter Hughes			—	—		
20	Dave Colyer			—	—		
21	Kyle Webster			—	—		
22	Sam Richardson			—	—		
23	Tom Pearce			—	—		
24	Len Parker			—	—		
25	Jonathan Williams			—	—		
26	Peter de Waal			—	—		

Sources: Elections New Zealand. Party Lists of Unsuccessful Registered Parties (2008), Electorate Candidate and Party Votes Recorded at Each Polling Place (2008)

=== Republic of New Zealand Party ===
Rank	Name	Incumbency	Contesting electorate	Previous rank	Change	Initial results	Later changes
1	Kerry Bevin		Auckland Central	1	0		
2	Jack Gielen		Hamilton East	4	+2		
3	Dave Llewell		Mount Albert	—	—		
4	Brett Docherty			—	—		
5	Justin Harnish		Wellington Central	—	—		
6	David Macartney		Tauranga	—	—		

Sources: Elections New Zealand. Party Lists of Unsuccessful Registered Parties (2008), Party Lists of Unsuccessful Registered Parties (2005), Electorate Candidate and Party Votes Recorded at Each Polling Place (2008)

=== Workers Party ===
Rank	Name	Incumbency	Contesting electorate	Previous rank	Change	Initial results	Later changes
1	Don Franks		Wellington Central	—	—		
2	Daphna Whitmore		Manukau East	—	—		
3	Nick Kelly			—	—		
4	Paul Hopkinson		Christchurch East	—	—		
5	Byron Clark		Christchurch Central	—	—		
6	Jasmine Freemantle			—	—		
7	Rebecca Broad			—	—		
8	Tim Bowron			—	—		
9	Jen Isle			—	—		
10	Heleyni Pratley			—	—		
11	Joel Cosgrove			—	—		
12	Marika Pratley			—	—		
13	Josh Glue			—	—		
14	Nick Scullin			—	—		

Sources: Elections New Zealand. Party Lists of Unsuccessful Registered Parties (2008), Electorate Candidate and Party Votes Recorded at Each Polling Place (2008)
