= Opinion polling for the 2011 New Zealand general election =

Opinion polling has been commissioned throughout the duration of the 49th New Zealand Parliament and in the leadup to the 2011 election by various organisations. The main four are Television New Zealand, TV3, The New Zealand Herald and Roy Morgan Research. The sample size, margin of error and confidence interval of each poll varies by organisation and date.

== Party vote and key events ==
Refusals are generally excluded from the party vote percentages, while question wording and the treatment of "don't know" responses and those not intending to vote may vary between survey firms.

=== Graphical summary ===
The first graph below shows trend lines averaged across all polls for parties that have consistently polled on average above the 5.0% threshold. The second graph shows the parties polling over 1% which do not consistently poll above the 5.0% threshold.

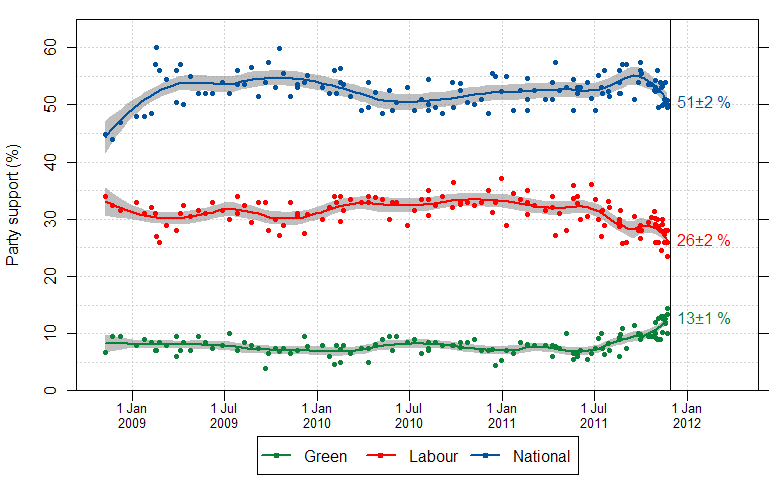
Summary of poll results given below up to and including 11 November 2011. For simplicity, only political parties that have consistently polled above the 5.0% threshold are shown. Lines give the mean estimated by a Loess smoother, with shaded grey areas showing the corresponding 95% confidence interval for the estimate. Figures to the right show the estimate from the smoothing line at the date of the most recent poll, with 95% confidence interval. The vertical line indicates the date of the general election: 26 November 2011.

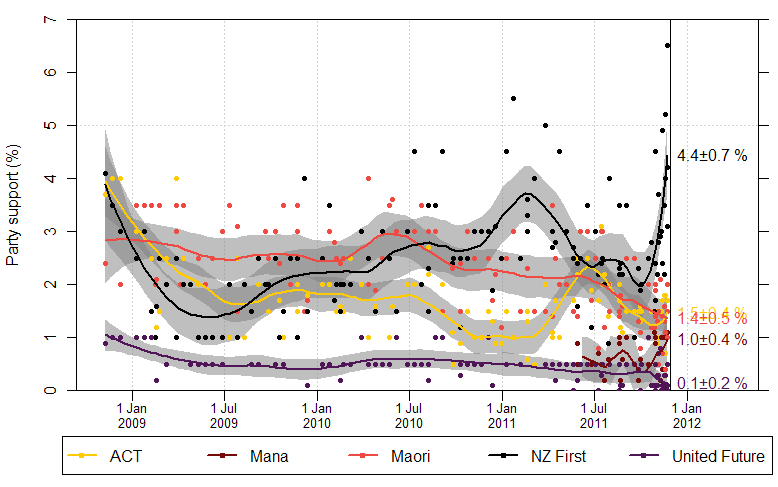
Summary poll results for political parties trending between 1.0% and the 5.0% threshold, based on the same smoother as the above figure.

=== Individual polls ===
Poll	Date (Note: These are the survey dates of the poll, or if the survey dates are not stated, the date the poll was released.)	National	Labour	Green	ACT	Māori	Prog	United Future	NZ First	Mana	Con
2008 election result	8 Nov 2008	44.93	33.99	6.72	3.65	2.39	0.91	0.87	4.07	N/A (Note: The Mana Movement and the Conservative Party of New Zealand were both formed in 2011, and as such, did not contest the 2008 general election)	
11 Nov 2008 – Phil Goff replaces Helen Clark as leader of Labour Party. 19 Nov 2008 – National Party leader John Key is sworn in as Prime Minister of New Zealand.
Roy Morgan Research	17–30 Nov 2008	44.0	32.5	9.5	4.0	3.5	0.5	1.0	3.5		
Roy Morgan Research	1–14 Dec 2008	47.0	31.5	9.5	4.0	2.0	0.5	1.0	3.0		
Roy Morgan Research	2–18 Jan 2009	48.0	33.0	8.0	3.0	3.5	0.5	1.0	2.5		
Roy Morgan Research	19 Jan – 1 Feb 2009	48.0	31.0	9.0	3.5	3.5	0.5	1.0	3.0		
Roy Morgan Research	2–15 Feb 2009	48.5	32	8.5	2.5	3.5	0.5	1	1.5		
One News Colmar Brunton	14–19 Feb 2009	57.0	31.0	7.0	2.0	2.0			1.0		
3 News Reid Research	18 Feb 2009	60.0	27.0	7.0	1.2	2.1		0.2	1.6		
Roy Morgan Research	16 Feb – 1 Mar 2009	56	26	8.5	1.5	3.5	0.5	<0.5	2.5		
Roy Morgan Research	2–15 Mar 2009	54.5	29	8	2.5	2	0.5	0.5	2		
One News Colmar Brunton	28 Mar – 1 Apr 2009	56.0	28.0	6.0	3.0	3.0			1.0		
Roy Morgan Research	23 Mar – 5 Apr 2009	50.5	28	9.5	4	3.5	1	<0.5	2.5		
One News Colmar Brunton	5 Apr 2009	57.0	31.0	7.0	2.0	2.0					
Roy Morgan Research	6–19 Apr 2009	50	32.5	8.5	2.5	3.5	0.5	<0.5	2		
Roy Morgan Research	20 Apr – 3 May 2009	55	30.5	7	2	2	<0.5	0.5	2		
Roy Morgan Research	4–17 May 2009	52.0	31.5	9.5	2.0	2.5	0.5	0.5	1.0		
Roy Morgan Research	18–31 May 2009	52.0	31.0	8.5	2.0	2.0	0.5	0.5	1.		
28 May 2009 – 2009 New Zealand budget presented to Parliament. 30 May 2009 – Metiria Turei replaces Jeanette Fitzsimons as female co-leader of the Green Party. 13 Jun 2009 – Mount Albert by-election: David Shearer retains the seat for Labour.
Roy Morgan Research	1–14 Jun 2009	52.0	33.0	7.5	2.5	2.5	0.5	0.5	1.0		
Roy Morgan Research	22 Jun – 5 Jul 2009	54	31.5	8	1	3	0.5	0.5	1		
Roy Morgan Research	6–19 Jul 2009	52	30	10	1	3.5	0.5	<0.5	2		
One News Colmar Brunton	25–29 Jul 2009	56	31	7	1	3.1					
Roy Morgan Research	20 Jul – 2 Aug 2009	53.5	34	7	2.5	1.5	0.5	<0.5	1		
Roy Morgan Research	3–16 Aug 2009	53.5	32.5	8.5	1	2	0.5	<0.5	2		
21 Aug 2009 – The citizens-initiated corporal punishment referendum is held, with voters responding 87.4% "No" to the question "Should a smack as part of good parental correction be a criminal offence in New Zealand?"
Roy Morgan Research	17–30 Aug 2009	56.5	29.5	8	1.5	1.5	0.5	0.5	1.5		
Roy Morgan Research	31 Aug – 13 Sep 2009	51.5	33	7.5	2	2.5	0.5	0.5	2.5		
One News Colmar Brunton	19–24 Sep 2009	54	33	4	3	3			2		
Roy Morgan Research	21 Sep – 4 Oct 2009	57.5	28	6.5	1.5	2.5	1	<0.5	2		
3 News Reid Research	18 Oct 2009	59.9	27.2	6.9	1.7	2.4			1.0		
Roy Morgan Research	5–18 Oct 2009	53	30	7.5	2.5	3	0.5	0.5	2.5		
Roy Morgan Research	19 Oct – 1 Nov 2009	55.5	29	7.5	1	3.5	0.5	0.5	1.5		
Roy Morgan Research	2–15 Nov 2009	51.5	33	6.5	2.5	2	1	<0.5	2.5		
One News Colmar Brunton	21–25 Nov 2009	53	31	7	2	3			1		
Roy Morgan Research	16–29 Nov 2009	53.5	30.5	7	1.5	3.5	<0.5	<0.5	2.5		
26 Nov 2009 – Labour leader Phil Goff makes race-related "nationhood" speech.
3 News Reid Research	13 Dec 2009	55.2	30.8	7.8	1.8	1.7		0.1	1.5		
Roy Morgan Research	30 Nov – 13 Dec 2009	54	27.5	9.5	1.5	1.5	0.5	<0.5	4		
Roy Morgan Research	4–17 Jan 2010	53	30	8	2	2.5	0.5	0.5	2.5		
Roy Morgan Research	18–31 Jan 2010	52	32	6	2	3	0.5	0.5	3.5		
Herald-DigiPoll	29 Jan – 10 Feb 2010	56	34	4.6	<1	2.8	<1	<1	1.7		
Roy Morgan Research	1–14 Feb 2010	52	33	8	1.5	2.5	0.5	<0.5	2		
3 News Reid Research	16 Feb 2010	56.3	29.6	7.3	1.6	2.4	0.2	0.2	1.5		
One News Colmar Brunton	14–17 Feb 2010	54	34	5	2	2			2		
Roy Morgan Research	15–28 Feb 2010	53.5	31.5	8	1.5	2.5	<0.5	0.5	2		
Roy Morgan Research	1–14 Mar 2010	51.5	33.5	6.5	2.5	2	1	0.5	2		
Roy Morgan Research	22 Mar – 4 Apr 2010	49	33	7.5	2	3	0.5	1	3		
One News Colmar Brunton	10–14 Apr 2010	54	33	5	2	2					
3 News Reid Research	25 Apr 2010	52.1	33.8	8.2	1.6	1.9		0.5	1.5		
Roy Morgan Research	5–18 Apr 2010	49.5	34	7.5	1	4	0.5	0.5	2.5		
Roy Morgan Research	3–16 May 2010	48.5	33.5	9	2.5	2.5	0.5	0.5	3		
20 May 2010 – 2010 New Zealand budget presented to Parliament.
Roy Morgan Research	17–30 May 2010	52.5	30	9.5	1	3.5	0.5	0.5	2.5		
One News Colmar Brunton	30 May 2010	49.0	33.0	7.0	1.6	3.6					
Roy Morgan Research	31 May – 13 Jun 2010	50.5	33	9.5	1	3	<0.5	1	1.5		
Roy Morgan Research	21 Jun – 4 Jul 2010	53	29	8.5	2	3	<0.5	0.5	3		
Roy Morgan Research	5–18 Jul 2010	49	31.5	9	2	3	0.5	0.5	4.5		
Roy Morgan Research	19 Jul – 1 Aug 2010	51	33.5	6.5	2	3.5	0.5	0.5	2		
One News Colmar Brunton	8 Aug 2010	49.0	35.0	7.0	2.7	2.3			2.3		
3 News Reid Research	8 Aug 2010	54.5	30.6	8.5	2.2	1.5		0.2	1.5		
Roy Morgan Research	2–15 Aug 2010	50	33.5	7.5	1.5	3		0.5	3.5		
17 Aug 2010 – Chris Carter is removed from the Labour caucus and becomes an independent MP. Labour is reduced to 42 seats but the Opposition remains at 53 seats.
Roy Morgan Research	16–29 Aug 2010	49.5	32.5	8.5	1	3		1	3.5		
4 Sep 2010 – A 7.1-magnitude earthquake strikes Canterbury.
Roy Morgan Research	30 Aug – 12 Sep 2010	48.5	34	8	2	1.5	0.5	1	4.5		
Roy Morgan Research	20 Sep – 3 Oct 2010	49.5	36.5	8	0.5	2.5			2.5		
One News Colmar Brunton	26 Sep 2010	54	32	8	1.1	2.3			2.4		
Roy Morgan Research	4–17 Oct 2010	52.5	33	8.5	0.5	1.5		0.5	2.5		
3 News Reid Research	11 Oct 2010	53.8	32.6	7.6	0.9	2.4		0.3	1.2		
Roy Morgan Research	18–31 Oct 2010	50.5	33	8.5	1.5	3	0.5	0.5	2.5		
Roy Morgan Research	1–14 Nov 2010	50	32.5	9	1	2.5		0.5	3		
20 Nov 2010 – Mana by-election: Kris Faafoi retains the seat for Labour, but with a significantly reduced majority.
Roy Morgan Research	15–28 Nov 2010	51	33	7	1	3	0.5	0.5	3		
Roy Morgan Research	29 Nov – 12 Dec 2010	48.5	35	7	1.5	2.5	0.5	1	3		
3 News Reid Research	13 Dec 2010	55.5	31.2	7.3	1.3	1.7		0.1	1.9		
One News Colmar Brunton	19 Dec 2010	55	33	4.5	0.9	2.2			3.1		
Herald-DigiPoll	30 Dec 2010	52.4	37.2	5.3	0.9	1.2			2.5		
Roy Morgan Research	4–16 Jan 2011	55	29	7	1.5	2.5		0.5	4.5		
26 Jan 2011 – John Key announces policy of partial privatisation of some state-owned assets.
Roy Morgan Research	17–30 Jan 2011	49	34.5	6.5	1	3			5.5		
2 February 2011 – John Key announces the election will be held on 26 November 2011.
Roy Morgan Research	31 Jan – 13 Feb 2011	52.5	33.5	8.5	0.5	1.5		0.5	2.5		
One News Colmar Brunton	20 Feb 2011	51	33	8	1.3	2.3			3.6		
3 News Reid Research	20 Feb 2011	54.6	30.9	8.2	0.6	2.3			3.3		
Roy Morgan Research	14–27 Feb 2011	49	35	8	1.5	3			3		
22 Feb 2011 – A 6.3-magnitude earthquake strikes Canterbury, with 181 casualties. 23 Feb 2011 – Hone Harawira defects from Maori Party to become an independent MP, and later forming the Mana Party. Government majority reduced from 16 to 14 seats; Maori Party reduced to four seats. 5 Mar 2011 – Botany by-election: Jami-Lee Ross retains the seat for National, but with a reduced majority.
Roy Morgan Research	28 Feb – 13 Mar 2011	52.5	32.5	8	0.5	1.5	0.5		4		
Roy Morgan Research	21 Mar – 3 Apr 2011	51	31.5	8	2	1.5		0.5	5		
One News Colmar Brunton	10 Apr 2011	54	34	6	1.1	1.4			2.7		
3 News Reid Research	17 Apr 2011	57.5	27.1	7.7	1.7	2.5		0.2	2.8		
Roy Morgan Research	4–17 Apr 2011	51	32	8	1	3.5	0.5	0.5	3		
30 Apr 2011 – Don Brash replaces Rodney Hide as leader of the ACT Party.
Roy Morgan Research	18 Apr – 1 May 2011	52.5	31	7.5	1	2	0.5	0.5	4.5		
Roy Morgan Research	2–15 May 2011	53	28	10	2	2	0.5	0.5	3		
19 May 2011 – 2011 New Zealand budget is presented to Parliament.
Herald-DigiPoll	19–25 May 2011	54.4	33.7	5.5	1.7	1.5	0	0	2.7		
One News Colmar Brunton	29 May 2011	52	34	6	2.5	1.4			1.6	0.9	
3 News Reid Research	29 May 2011	53.0	32.8	6.5	2.2	1.6		0.2	2.4	0.5	
Roy Morgan Research	16–29 May 2011	49	36	6.5	1.5	2.5		0.5	2.5		
Roy Morgan Research	30 May – 12 Jun 2011	53	30	7	3	3		0.5	2.5		
Roy Morgan Research	13–26 Jun 2011	54	30.5	5.5	2.5	3		0.5	3.5		
25 Jun 2011 – Te Tai Tokerau by-election: Hone Harawira is re-elected under the Mana Party.
Herald-DigiPoll	27 Jun 2011	51.2	36.1	6.6	1.9	1.7			1.2	0.5	
Roy Morgan Research	27 Jun – 10 Jul 2011	49	33.5	7.5	3	2.5		0.5	3		
3 News Reid Research	10 Jul 2011	55.1	29.9	9.1	1.7	0.8		0.0	2.2	0.7	
14 Jul 2011 – Labour releases their proposed tax package, including the introduction of a capital gains tax.
One News Colmar Brunton	17 Jul 2011	53	27	10	3.1	3		0.3	2.4	0.5	
Roy Morgan Research	11–24 Jul 2011	52	31.5	7.5	2	3		0.5	2.5	0.5	
Fairfax Media–Research International	21–25 Jul 2011	56	29	6.4	2.2	1.2	0.2		2.0	0.2	
Herald-DigiPoll	30 Jul 2011	52.3	33.1	8.3	1.4	2.0			0.9	0.6	
Roy Morgan Research	25 Jul – 7 Aug 2011	51.5	32	7	2	1.5		0.5	4	0.5	
One News Colmar Brunton	21 Aug 2011	56	30	6	1.7	1.4		0.5	2.3	0.9	
3 News Reid Research	21 Aug 2011	54.0	28.8	9.3	2.2	1.5		0.0	2.2	0.9	
Herald-DigiPoll	19–26 Aug 2011	52	31.5	9.8	1.2	1.8		0.1	2.4	0.2	
Roy Morgan Research	15 – 28 Aug 2011	52	29.5	9	2	1.5		0.5	3.5	1	
Fairfax Media–Research International	25–29 Aug 2011	57.1	25.7	11.0	1.1	1.6		0.1	2.2	0.6	
Roy Morgan Research	29 Aug – 11 Sep 2011	57	26	7.5	1.5	2.5		0.5	3.5	1	
9 September 2011 – The 2011 Rugby World Cup opens in Auckland, with unexpected overcrowding of the Auckland Waterfront fan zone and transport delays resulting in some people missing the opening ceremony and game. 13 September 2011 – The Government takes control of the Auckland Waterfront fan zone from Auckland Council.
Roy Morgan Research	12 – 25 Sep 2011	51	30.5	11.5	1.5	2.5		0.5	1	0.5	
30 Sep 2011 – Credit agencies Fitch and Standard & Poor's both downgrade New Zealand's long-term credit rating from AA+ to AA.
Fairfax Media–Research International	28 Sep 2011	54	28	10	1.5	1.3		0.4	2.3	0.2	
One News Colmar Brunton	2 Oct 2011	56	29	9	1.3	1.1		0.0	1.9	0.6	
3 News Reid Research	2 Oct 2011	57.4	26.6	9.8	1.6	0.8		0.0	1.9	0.	
Roy Morgan Research	26 Sep – 9 Oct 2011	55.5	28	9.5	1.5	2		0.5	2	0.5	
5 Oct 2011 – MV Rena runs aground on the Astrolabe Reef causing an oil spill in Tauranga, described as New Zealand's worst environmental disaster.
Roy Morgan Research	10–23 Oct 2011	53.5	29.5	9.5	1	2		1	2.5	0.5	
26 Oct 2011 – Writ Day: The writ of election is issued by the Chief Justice on behalf of the Governor General, instructing the Electoral Commission to conduct the election. Electoral roll closes for printing with 3.01 million eligible voters.^{[note a]} Main campaigning season begins.
Herald-DigiPoll	20–27 Oct 2011	53.5	30.3	9.5	1.5	1.2		0.1	2.8	0.1	
3 News Reid Research	30 Oct 2011	52.3	30.2	9.4	1.5	1.4		0.0	2.4	0.9	
Fairfax Media–Research International	27–31 Oct 2011	52.6	31.3	9.7	1.2	1.2	0.2	0.1	1.5	1.1	
Herald-DigiPoll	28 Oct – 2 Nov 2011	54.2	29.1	10.1	0.9	1.9		0.5	1.7	0.1	1.1
One News Colmar Brunton	3 Nov 2011	56	30	9	0.9	1.3		0.1	2.2	0.3	
Roy Morgan Research	24 Oct – 6 Nov 2011	53	26	12	1	2		0	4.5	1.0	
Fairfax Media–Research International	3–7 Nov 2011	52.5	25.9	12.6	1.0	1.5	0.2	0.3	2.8	0.7	
Herald-DigiPoll	3–9 Nov 2011	49.5	28.7	12.6	1.5	0.5		0.7	3.7	0.7	1
One News Colmar Brunton	10 Nov 2011	54	28	9	1.5	2.1		0.8	2.9	0.2	0.5
3 News Reid Research	13 Nov 2011	53.3	29.9	10.2	0.7	1.4		0.0	2.4	1.0	
11 Nov 2011 – A potentially damaging conversation between John Key and political ally John Banks is recorded without their knowledge.
Herald-DigiPoll	10–16 Nov 2011	49.9	29.1	12.6	1.7	0.7		0.1	4.9	0.4	0.6
One News Colmar Brunton	17 Nov 2011	51	26	13	1.6	1.6		0.3	2.2	1.3	1.4
3 News Reid Research	17 Nov 2011	50.2	27.4	13.0	1.8	1.3		0.0	3.5	1.0	1.1
Roy Morgan Research	7 – 18 Nov 2011	53	24.5	13	1.5	3		0	3	1.0	
Fairfax Media–Research International	17 – 21 Nov 2011	54.0	26.0	12.0	0.7	1.1	0.0	0.1	4.0	1.1	
Herald-DigiPoll	17 – 23 Nov 2011	50.9	28.0	11.8	1.8	0.4		0.0	5.2	0.3	1.3
One News Colmar Brunton	24 Nov 2011	50	28	10	1.7	2.0		0.1	4.2	1.0	2.4
3 News Reid Research	24 Nov 2011	50.8	26.0	13.4	1.0	1.5		0.0	3.1	1.1	1.8
Roy Morgan Research ^{[note b]}	22 – 24 Nov 2011	49.5	23.5	14.5	1.5	1		0.5	6.5	0.5	
26 Nov 2011 – Election Day: A total of 3,049,212 voters were registered to vote in the election. A total of 2,257,336 votes were cast, including the 188,730 advance votes, with a turnout of 73.5%.
2011 election result	26 Nov 2011	47.31	27.48	11.06	1.07	1.43	–^{[note c]}	0.60	6.59	1.08	2.65
Poll	Date	National	Labour	Green	ACT	Māori	Prog	United Future	NZ First	Mana	Con

- ^[note a] Voters enrolling after this date could still vote in the general election, but were not included on the printed roll and had to cast special declaration votes.
- ^[note b] The two graphs near the top of the page include data up to and including this poll.
- ^[note c] The Progressive Party did not contest the 2011 election.

== Preferred prime minister ==
=== Individual polls ===
Poll	Date	John Key	Helen Clark	Phil Goff	Winston Peters
Colmar Brunton	14–19 Feb 2009	51		6	2
Colmar Brunton	28 Mar – 1 Apr 2009	51		6	1
TV ONE Colmar Brunton	5 Apr 2009	51	9	6	
Colmar Brunton	25–29 Jul 2009	54		7	2
3 News-Reid Research	18 Oct 2009	51.6	8.2	4.7	3.0
ONE News Colmar Brunton	21–25 Nov 2009	54		5	2
26 Nov 2009 – Labour leader Phil Goff makes race-related "nationhood" speech.
3 News-Reid Research	13 Dec 2009	49.9	6.1	8.0	2.1
Herald Digipoll	29 Jan – 10 Feb 2010	58	7	6.8	
ONE News Colmar Brunton	10–14 Apr 2010	48		8	
ONE News Colmar Brunton	May 2010	46		6	
ONE News Colmar Brunton	8 Aug 2010	45		9	
3 News-Reid Research	8 Aug 2010	48.7	2.3	7.4	3.7
ONE News Colmar Brunton	26 Sep 2010	52		8	
One News-Colmar Brunton	19 Dec 2010	49.1		6.8	4.9
3 News-Reid Research	20 Feb 2011	49.1		6.8	4.9
ONE News Colmar Brunton	20 Feb 2011	48	2	7	3
One News-Colmar Brunton	10 Apr 2011	55		11	3
3 News-Reid Research	17 Apr 2011	52.4		6.8	
Herald Digipoll	27 May 2011	67.7		11.9	
One News-Colmar Brunton	29 May 2011	53		8	
3 News-Reid Research	29 May 2011	48.2		7.6	
One News-Colmar Brunton	17 Jul 2011	54		9	
Herald Digipoll	30 Jul 2011	70.3	7.9	9.3	2.9
One News-Colmar Brunton	21 Aug 2011	57		8	
Herald Digipoll	29 Oct 2011	70.6		13.7	3.5
One News-Colmar Brunton	3 Nov 2011	56		12	
Fairfax Media-Research International	17–21 Nov 2011	51.5		12.5	3.5
Poll	Date	John Key	Helen Clark	Phil Goff	Winston Peters

== Other polls ==
=== Epsom electorate vote ===
Poll	Date	John Banks	Paul Goldsmith	David Parker	David Hay
2008 election result	8 November 2008	56.1^{[a]}	21.8^{[a]}	13.6^{[a]}	7.4^{[a]}
New Zealand Herald-Key Research	9 October 2011	18.9	32.9	4.3	1
Fairfax Media Research International	17 November 2011	29.1	45.5	14.6	7.7
One News Colmar Brunton	14–17 November 2011	30	41	17	11
2011 general election, final result	26 November 2011	44.10	37.80	10.45	6.01

^[a] The candidates in the 2008 general election were Rodney Hide, Richard Worth, Kate Sutton, and Keith Locke respectively.

== Concern over validity ==
A new polling company, Horizon, has challenged some of the existing polls' validity as they exclude undecided voters and those who chose not to vote. Horizon claim that this may be up to 30% in some polls. However, Horizon's own polling methods have been criticised for their use of a self-selected internet panel. At the 2008 election only the Green Party gained a proportion of the party vote outside (below) what poll trends would suggest.

== See also ==
- Opinion polling for the 2008 New Zealand general election
- Opinion polling for the 2014 New Zealand general election
- Opinion polling for the next New Zealand general election
- Politics of New Zealand
