= Opinion polling for the 2008 New Zealand general election =

Opinion polling has been commissioned throughout the duration of the 48th New Zealand Parliament and in the leadup to the 2008 election by various organisations, the main four being TVNZ, TV3, The New Zealand Herald and Roy Morgan Research. The sample size, margin of error and confidence interval of each poll varies by organisation and date.

== Party vote and key events in the leadup to the 2008 election ==
Refusals are generally excluded from the party vote percentages, while question wording and the treatment of "don't know" responses and those not intending to vote may vary between survey firms.

=== Graphical summary ===
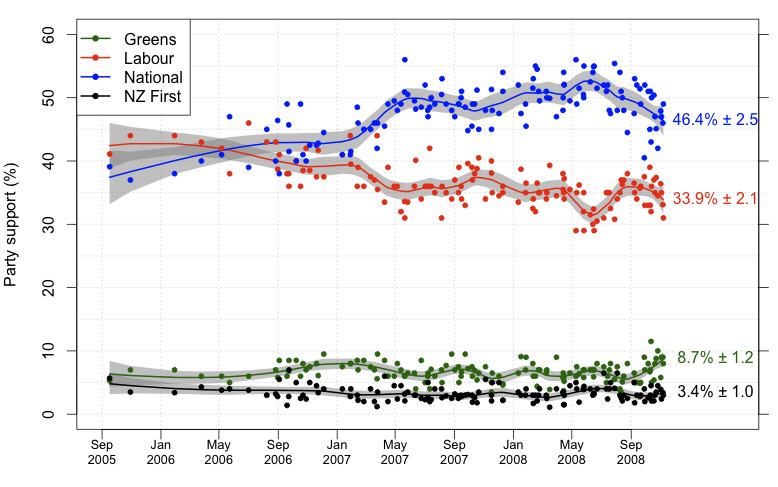
Summary of poll results up to 7 November 2008 for all political parties that have exceeded the 5.0% mixed member proportional representation (MMP) threshold. Lines give the mean estimated by a Loess smoother, with shaded grey areas showing the corresponding 95% confidence interval for the estimate. Figures to the right show the estimate from the smoothing line at the date of the most recent poll, with 95% confidence interval.

=== Individual polls ===
Poll	Date	Labour	National	NZ First	Māori	Green	ACT	United Future	Prog
2005 election result	17 September 2005	41.1	39.1	5.7	2.1	5.3	1.5	2.7	1.2
Roy Morgan Research	17 September–2 October 2005	36.5	41.5	4.5	3	9	1.5	3	1
Roy Morgan Research	4–16 October 2005	39	40.5	5	2	7	1.5	3.5	1
Roy Morgan Research	18–31 October 2005	37.5	40	6	1	9	1	3.5	0.5
3 News TNS	27 October–2 November 2005	44	37	3.5	2.5	7	1.5	2.5	0.7
One News Colmar Brunton	20 November 2005	40	44	4	2	7	1	1	
Herald-DigiPoll	30 November 2005 (Note: Dates surveyed unavailable: date shown is date polled released to media.)	43.8	41.7	3.8	1.5	5.3	1.5	1.3	
One News Colmar Brunton	11 December 2005	37	46	4	2.1	7			
Roy Morgan International	13–23 January 2006	39	40.5	4.5	1.5	8.5	1.5	3.0	0.0
Sunday Star-Times/BRC	16–25 January 2006	42	43	4	1	6	1	1	
3 News TNS	26 January–2 February 2006	44	38	3.4	1.7	7	1.2	1.5	0.5
One News Colmar Brunton	19 February 2006	42	45	4	2	6	1	1	
3 News TNS	23–29 March 2006	43	40	4.3	3	6	1.1	1.9	0.2
Herald-DigiPoll	10 April 2006	43.4	44.6	3.9	2.1	5.2	1.1	1.5	
3 News TNS	4–10 May 2006	42	41	3.8	2.2	6	1.8	1.9	0.2
18 May 2006 – 2006 New Zealand budget presented to Parliament.
One News Colmar Brunton	22–25 May 2006	38	47	4	3	5	1.1	1.4	0.1
3 News TNS	29 June–5 July 2006	46	39	3.8	1.3	6	0.8	1.1	0.4
One News Colmar Brunton	16 July 2006	43	45	2	2	4	2	0.8	
One News Colmar Brunton	7–10 August 2006	43	45	3	2.6	3	0.9	1.5	0.4
Herald-DigiPoll	31 August 2006	38.7	46.4	2.8	3.4	5.8	0.7	1.1	0.2
3 News TNS	24–30 August 2006	43	40	3.2	2.8	7	1	1.2	0.2
Roy Morgan Research	28 August–10 September 2006	41	38	5.5	3	8.5	1.5	2	0.5
13 September 2006 – National Party leader Don Brash takes leave to sort out marital problems amidst rumours he had an affair.
Poll	Date	Labour	National	NZ First	Māori	Green	ACT	United Future	Prog
Herald-DigiPoll	22–24 September 2006	38	45.7	2.8	4.1	6.8	1.4	0.7	0.3
One News Colmar Brunton	18–21 September 2006	38	49	–	3	6	–	–	–
Roy Morgan Research	16 September–1 October 2006	36	41.5	7	2.5	8.5	1.5	2.5	–
Roy Morgan Research	2–15 October 2006	40	40	5	1.5	8.5	2	1.5	0.5
One News Colmar Brunton	16–19 October 2006	36	49	2.5	2.4	6	0.5	0.9	0.2
Roy Morgan Research	16–29 October 2006	38.5	41	3	2.5	8	1.5	3	–
3 News TNS	26 October–1 November 2006	42	40	2.4	3.4	7	1.5	1.9	0.2
Roy Morgan Research	30 October–12 November 2006	38.5	42.5	5	2.5	7.5	0.5	1.5	0.5
Roy Morgan Research	13–26 November 2006	37.5	42.5	4.5	2	8	1.5	3	–
27 November 2006 – John Key becomes leader of the National Party.
Herald-DigiPoll	14 November–2 December 2006	41.7	42.8	3.4	2	6.1	1	1.6	0.4
Roy Morgan Research	27 November–12 December 2006	37.5	44.5	4	1	9.5	0.5	2	0.5
Roy Morgan Research	3–21 January 2007	41	41	4	2	7.5	1.5	1	0.5
3 News TNS	25 January–1 February 2007	44	41	2.8	2	8	0.8	0.8	0.1
Roy Morgan Research	23 January–5 February 2007	39.5	41.5	4	2	8	1.5	2.5	0.5
13 February 2007 – Taito Phillip Field is expelled from the Labour Party caucus after saying he would stand for election at the 2008 election, either with Labour or as an independent.
Poll	Date	Labour	National	NZ First	Māori	Green	ACT	United Future	Prog
One News Colmar Brunton	12–15 February 2007	39	46	2.2	3.1	7	1.3	0.5	0.4
Roy Morgan Research	6–18 February 2007	36	48.5	3	1.5	8.5	1	1.5	–
Roy Morgan Research	19 February–4 March 2007	36	45	2	3.5	8.5	2.5	1.5	0.5
Roy Morgan Research	5–18 March 2007	37.5	45	4	3.5	7.5	1	1.5	–
One News Colmar Brunton	17–22 March 2007	37	46	2	3.4	7	1.5	1.6	0.1
3 News TNS	22–28 March 2007	44	42	1.2	3.4	5.6	1.2	0.7	0.2
Roy Morgan Research	19 March–2 April 2007	35.5	46	3.5	2.5	9.5	1	1	–
Roy Morgan Research	3–16 April 2007	33.5	45.5	6	2	8.5	1	2	–
One News Colmar Brunton	14–19 April 2007	39	49	2	1.7	6	1	0.6	0.2
Roy Morgan Research	23 April–6 May 2007	36	49.5	4.5	1.5	6	0.5	1.5	–
3 News TNS	3–9 May 2007	36	48	2.4	3.7	8	0.5	0.6	0.1
16 May 2007 – Parliament passes the Crimes (Substituted Section 59) Amendment Act 2007.
17 May 2007 – 2007 New Zealand budget presented to Parliament.
Roy Morgan Research	7–20 May 2007	32	49	4.5	2.5	7	1.5	1.5	–
Herald-DigiPoll	18–24 May 2007	33.6	50.9	3.2	1.7	6.1	0.7	0.8	0.4
One News Colmar Brunton	19–24 May 2007	31	56	2.1	2.9	6	0.4	1	0.2
Roy Morgan Research	21 May–3 June 2007	33.5	50.5	3.5	1.5	6.5	0.5	2	0.5
7 June 2007 – The Reserve Bank intervenes in the currency market by selling New Zealand Dollars in an attempt halt the increase in value of the currency.
Poll	Date	Labour	National	NZ First	Māori	Green	ACT	United Future	Prog
Roy Morgan Research	4–17 June 2007	36	49.5	3	1.5	6.5	1.5	0.5	0.5
Herald-DigiPoll	4–22 June 2007	40.1	48.2	3	2.4	4	0.6	0.3	–
Roy Morgan Research	18 June–1 July 2007	34	48.5	2.5	2	8.5	1	1.5	1
1 July 2007 – Introduction of several government policies, including 20 hours funded childcare for 3 and 4-year olds and the Kiwisaver retirement savings scheme.
One News Colmar Brunton	30 June–5 July 2007	36	52	2.3	2.6	5	0.3	0.6	0.4
3 News TNS	5–11 July 2007	36	48	2.6	2.7	6	1.2	1.1	–
UMR Research	c. 15 July 2007	36	50	2.3	2.6	7.1	0.4	0.8	–
Roy Morgan Research	2–15 July 2007	36	47	5	2	6.5	1.5	1	0.5
Herald-DigiPoll	5–19 July 2007	42	48.5	2	1.8	4	0.4	0.3	–
Roy Morgan Research	16–29 July 2007	35	49	4	3	6	0.5	0.5	0.5
One News Colmar Brunton	4–9 August 2007	36	53	2.6	1	5	1.2	0.5	0.2
UMR Research	c. 15 August 2007	35	49	2.9	2.1	7.7	0.6	1.1	–
Roy Morgan Research	30 July–12 August 2007	31	50.5	4	3	7	1.5	2	0.5
Roy Morgan Research	20 August–2 September 2007	34	48	2.5	3	9.5	1	0.5	0.5
3 News TNS	30 August–5 September 2007	37	47	3.2	1.8	7	1.5	0.1	–
Fairfax Media–Nielsen	15 September 2007	36	50	3	2	6	1	1	0
One News Colmar Brunton	8–13 September 2007	39	49	2.9	2.8	5	0.8	0.5	0.3
Roy Morgan Research	3–16 September 2007	35	49	2.5	3	7.5	1.5	1	–
UMR Research	13–19 September 2007	34	51	2.8	2.6	6.7	0.9	0.4	–
Herald-DigiPoll	29 September 2007	39.6	44.8	3.1	2.8	7.2	1.1	0.4	0.2
Roy Morgan Research	17–30 September 2007	33	48.5	3	2.5	9.5	1	1.5	0.5
One News Colmar Brunton	6–11 October 2007	37	49	1.9	2.8	6	0.6	0.4	0.1
Roy Morgan Research	1–14 October 2007	39	45.5	3	2	7.5	0.5	1.5	–
UMR Research	11–15 October 2007	38	49	2.6	1.2	6.9	0.8	0.5	–
15 October 2007 – Operation 8 police raids on activists.
Poll	Date	Labour	National	NZ First	Māori	Green	ACT	United Future	Prog
Herald-DigiPoll	8–28 October 2007	38.8	51.2	1.8	1.8	5.4	0.2	0.2	–
Roy Morgan Research	15–28 October 2007	40.5	45	3.5	1.5	6.5	1	1.5	–
Roy Morgan Research	29 October–11 November 2007	34	48	5.5	2.5	7.5	1	1	–
12 November 2007 – The New Zealand Herald dedicates its front page to criticism of the Electoral Finance Bill under headline "Democracy under attack".
Herald-DigiPoll	8–26 November 2007	38.1	51.3	2.1	3	3.5	0.7	0.4	0.3
Fairfax Media–Nielsen	17 November 2007	40	45	3	3	5	1	1	0
Roy Morgan Research	12–25 November 2007	35	48	5	2.5	6.5	1.5	0.5	0.5
3 News TNS	8–13 December 2007	36	51	2.2	2.8	4.8	0.9	0.7	–
One News Colmar Brunton	8–13 December 2007	35	54	2.2	1.7	4.6	0.8	0.5	0.1
Roy Morgan Research	26 November–9 December 2007	34.5	47.5	5	2	6	1.5	0.5	0.5
Roy Morgan Research	3–20 January 2008	33.5	52	3.5	2	6.5	1	0.5	0.5
Herald-DigiPoll	10–24 January 2008	38.7	47.5	3	1	9.1	0.7	0	0
3 News TNS	23–30 January 2008	35	49	3	3	7	0.5	0.5	–
29 January, 30 January 2008 – John Key and Helen Clark open their election year campaigns with speeches focusing on youth issues.
Poll	Date	Labour	National	NZ First	Māori	Green	ACT	United Future	Prog
Roy Morgan Research	21 January–3 February 2008	36.5	45.5	4	2	9	2	0.5	0.5
One News Colmar Brunton	9–14 February 2008	34	53	1.7	3.3	6	0.9	0.2	–
Roy Morgan Research	4–17 February 2008	32.5	51.5	3	3	8	0.5	0.5	0.5
Fairfax Media–Nielsen	13–19 February 2008	32	55	3	2	6	1	0	0
3 News TNS	19–26 February 2008	35	51	3	2	7	1	0.1	0.1
Herald-DigiPoll	11–28 February 2008	36.5	54.5	2.1	1.5	4.4	0.4	0.4	0
Roy Morgan Research	18 February–2 March 2008	35	49.5	4	2	7	1	0.5	0.5
One News Colmar Brunton	8–13 March 2008	35	50	2.5	3.3	7	0.9	0.3	0.1
Roy Morgan Research	3–16 March 2008	34	51	3	2	6.5	1.5	1	0.5
Herald-DigiPoll	6–27 March 2008	39.3	49.9	1.1	3.7	3.9	1.1	0	–
Roy Morgan Research	24 March–6 April 2008	34.5	47	4	3	9	1.5	0.5	0.5
3 News TNS	10–16 April 2008	38	48	3.4	2.9	5.8	0.5	0.3	–
One News Colmar Brunton	12–17 April 2008	35	54	1.5	3.2	3.7	1.1	0.2	0.1
Roy Morgan Research	7–20 April 2008	35.5	50	3.5	2.5	6.5	1.5	0.5	–
Fairfax Media–Nielsen	9–22 April 2008	34	52	3	3	6	0	1	1
Herald-DigiPoll	5–26 April 2008	37.2	52.1	1.5	2.9	5.2	0.4	0.1	0
Poll	Date	Labour	National	NZ First	Māori	Green	ACT	United Future	Prog
Roy Morgan Research	21 April–4 May 2008	35.5	49.5	4.5	2	6.5	1	1	–
Fairfax Media–Nielsen	7–13 May 2008	29	56	5	2	6	1	0	0
17 May 2008 – 2008 New Zealand budget presented to Parliament.
Roy Morgan Research	5–18 May 2008	35	49	4	2.5	7.5	1	.5	–
Herald-DigiPoll	5–28 May 2008	36.2	51.5	1.9	2.2	6.4	0.7	0.4	0
3 News TNS	23–29 May 2008	35	50	3.9	2	5.8	1	0.2	0.1
One News Colmar Brunton	24–29 May 2008	29	55	4.4	2.5	7	1.2	0.2	0.1
Roy Morgan Research	19 May–1 June 2008	32	50.5	4	3	7	1.5	1	–
Roy Morgan Research	2–15 June 2008	31.5	52.5	4	2	7	2	0.5	–
Fairfax Media–Nielsen	11–17 June 2008	30	54	3	2	7	1	1	–
One News Colmar Brunton	14–19 June 2008	29	55	3.2	4.4	7	0.8	0.4	0
Herald-DigiPoll	6–25 June 2008	32.4	54.9	3.3	1.8	5.9	0.8	0.1	–
Roy Morgan Research	16–29 June 2008	30.5	51.5	4	2.5	8	2	1	–
Poll	Date	Labour	National	NZ First	Māori	Green	ACT	United Future	Prog
Roy Morgan Research	30 June–13 July 2008	31	52	6.5	1	7.5	0.5	1	–
Fairfax Media–Nielsen	9–15 July 2008	35	51	4	2	5	1	0	–
One News Colmar Brunton	12–17 July 2008	35	52	2.4	1.7	6	1.2	0.3	0
3 News TNS	Released 18 July 2008	35	48	4	2	7	1	0.3	0
Herald-DigiPoll	Released 29 July 2008	30.8	55.4	4.1	2.6	5.5	0.2	0.9	–
Roy Morgan Research	14–27 July 2008	32.5	47.5	5	3	8	2.5	0.5	–
Roy Morgan Research	28 July–10 August 2008	34	48	6.5	2	7.5	1.5	0	–
Fairfax Media–Nielsen	6–12 August 2008	35	54	3	2	4	1	0	–
One News Colmar Brunton	9–14 August 2008	37	51	2.6	3.1	3.5	0.6	0.7	0.1
3 News TNS	14–20 August 2008	37	48	3	2	6	2	1	0
Roy Morgan Research	18–31 August 2008	38	44.5	2.5	3.5	8	1.5	1	–
Herald-DigiPoll	3–25 August 2008	36.3	50	2.1	3.1	5.1	2.3	0	–
One News Colmar Brunton	6–11 September 2008	35	53	1.8	1.8	5	2	0	0
11 September 2008 – Parliament passes a law creating the New Zealand Emissions Trading Scheme.
12 September 2008 – Helen Clark announces the election will be held 8 November 2008.
Poll	Date	Labour	National	NZ First	Māori	Green	ACT	United Future	Prog
Roy Morgan Research	1–14 September 2008	36.5	47.5	5	1.5	6.5	1.5	0.5	–
Fairfax Media–Nielsen	10–16 September 2008	34	52	3	3	5	1	–	–
Herald-DigiPoll	15–24 September 2008	35.7	51.4	2.8	1.9	4.9	1.1	0.4	0.4
3 News TNS	18–24 September 2008	36	49	3	2	5	2	0	0
One News Colmar Brunton	27 September–2 October 2008	33	52	2.0	2.5	7	1.5	0.7	0.3
Roy Morgan Research	22 September –5 October 2008	37.5	40.5	4	2	9	3.5	1	1
3 News TNS	Released 10 October 2008	39	45	2.7	2.5	6.7	1.8	0.1	0.1
One News Colmar Brunton	4–9 October 2008	33	51	2.6	2.8	8	1.6	0.1	0.3
Fairfax Media–Nielsen	8–14 October 2008	33	51	3	2	7	1	1	0
One News Colmar Brunton	11–16 October 2008	36	50	2.1	2.1	5	2.1	0.5	0.5
3 News TNS	Released 23 October 2008	37.4	45.1	3.5	2.3	8.8	1.7	0.2	0.1
Poll	Date	Labour	National	NZ First	Māori	Green	ACT	United Future	Prog
Roy Morgan Research	6–19 October 2008	32	43	4.5	2.5	11.5	3.5	0.5	0.5
Herald-DigiPoll	15–22 October 2008	37.0	50.4	2.1	2.4	5.4	1.2	0.2	0.3
One News Colmar Brunton	18–23 October 2008	35.0	47.0	3.0	3.0	8.0	2.0	0.4	0.0
3 News TNS	Released 6 November 2008	33.1	46.0	3.4	2.7	9.0	2.8	0.2	0.3
One News Colmar Brunton	1–5 November 2008	35.0	47.0	2.4	1.3	9.0	2.5	0.4	0.4
Herald-DigiPoll	29 October–5 November 2008	36.4	47.9	3.9	2.3	5.8	1.8	0.7	0.2
Fairfax Media–Nielsen	Released 7 November 2008	31	49	3	3	8	4	1	–
Roy Morgan Research	20 October–2 November 2008	34.5	42	4.5	2.5	10	4	1	–
2008 election result	8 November 2008	33.99	44.93	4.07	2.39	6.72	3.65	0.87	0.91

== Preferred Prime Minister ==
=== Graphical summary ===
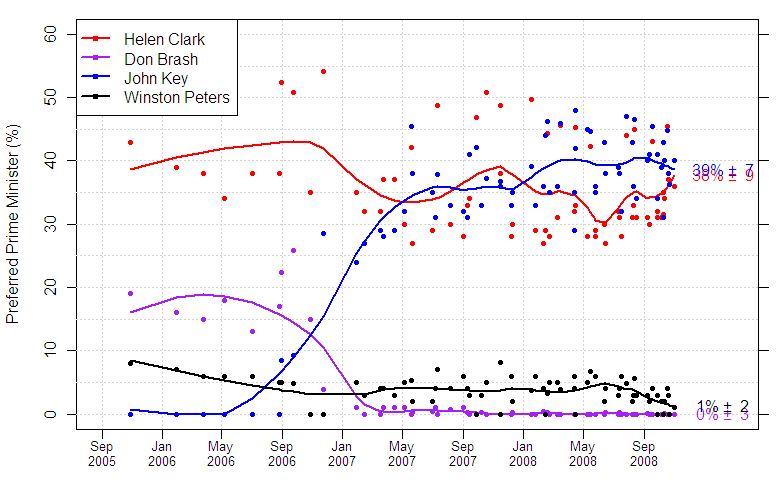
Summary of Preferred Prime Minister Polls up to 6 November 2008. Lines show the mean, as estimated by a Loess smoother. Figures to the right show the estimate from the smoothing line at the date of the most recent poll, with 95% confidence interval.

=== Individual polls ===
Poll	Date	Helen Clark	Don Brash	John Key	Winston Peters
TV3–TNS	27 October – 2 November 2005	43	19	–	8
TV3–TNS	26 January – 2 February 2006	39	16	–	7
TV3–TNS	23–29 March 2006	38	15	–	6
TV3–TNS	4–10 May 2006	34	18	–	6
TV3–TNS	29 June – 5 July 2006	38	13	0	6
TV3–TNS	24–30 August 2006	38	17	0	5
Herald–DigiPoll	31 August 2006	52.4	22.4	8.5	5
Herald–DigiPoll	22–24 September 2006	50.8	25.9	9.2	4.8
TV3–TNS	26 October–1 November 2006	35	15	–	–
Herald–DigiPoll	14 November–2 December 2006	54.2	3.9	28.5	–
TV3–TNS	25 January–1 February 2007	35	1	24	5
One News–Colmar Brunton	12–15 February 2007	32	–	27	3
One News–Colmar Brunton	17–22 March 2007	32	–	29	4
TV3–TNS	22–28 March 2007	37	1	28	4
One News–Colmar Brunton	14–19 April 2007	37	1	29	3
TV3–TNS	3–9 May 2007	30	1	32	5
Herald–DigiPoll	18–24 May 2007	42.1	–	45.5	5.4
One News–Colmar Brunton	19–24 May 2007	27	0.3	38	2
Poll	Date	Helen Clark	Don Brash	John Key	Winston Peters
One News–Colmar Brunton	30 June–5 July 2007	29	0.5	35	2
TV3–TNS	5–11 July 2007	31	1	31	4
Herald–DigiPoll	5–19 July 2007	48.7	–	37.9	7
One News–Colmar Brunton	4–9 August 2007	30	0.7	33	4
TV3–TNS	30 August – 5 September 2007	28	1	32	6
Fairfax Media Poll	15 September 2007	34	–	41	3
One News–Colmar Brunton	8–13 September 2007	33	0.3	31	4
Herald–DigiPoll	29 September 2007	46.8	–	42.2	–
One News–Colmar Brunton	6–11 October 2007	33	0.2	33	3
Herald–DigiPoll	8–28 October 2007	50.8	–	37.3	5
Fairfax Media Poll	17 November 2007	38	–	36	–
Herald–DigiPoll	8–26 November 2007	48.7	–	36.7	8.1
TV3–TNS	5–12 December 2007	28	–	33	6
One News–Colmar Brunton	8–13 December 2007	30	0.2	35	2
Herald–DigiPoll	10–24 January 2008	49.7	–	39.2	3.8
TV3–TNS	23–30 January 2008	29	–	33	6
One News–Colmar Brunton	9–14 February 2008	27	0.4	36	4
Fairfax Media–Nielsen	13–19 February 2008	29	–	44	–
TV3–TNS	19–26 February 2008	28	–	35	5
Herald–DigiPoll	11–28 February 2008	44.3	0.2	46.3	3.3
One News–Colmar Brunton	8–13 March 2008	31	–	36	5
Herald–DigiPoll	6–27 March 2008	45.6	–	45.9	3.9
Poll	Date	Helen Clark	Don Brash	John Key	Winston Peters
TV3–TNS	10–16 April 2008	32	–	29	6
One News–Colmar Brunton	12–17 April 2008	29	–	35	4
Fairfax Media–Nielsen	9–22 April 2008	33	–	42	–
Herald–DigiPoll	5–26 April 2008	45.3	–	48	–
Fairfax Media–Nielsen	7–13 May 2008	28	–	45	5
Herald–DigiPoll	5–28 May 2008	42.3	–	44.6	6.7
TV3–TNS	23–29 May 2008	29	–	35	6
One News–Colmar Brunton	24–29 May 2008	28	–	36	6
Fairfax Media–Nielsen	11–17 June 2008	30	–	43	2
One News–Colmar Brunton	14–19 June 2008	27	0.2	38	4
Fairfax Media–Nielsen	9–15 July 2008	32	–	39	3
One News–Colmar Brunton	12–17 July 2008	31	0.3	38	4
TV3–TNS	Released 18 July 2008	28	–	32	6
Herald–DigiPoll	Released 29 July 2008	44	–	47.1	4.9
Fairfax Media–Nielsen	6–12 August 2008	31	–	43	2
One News–Colmar Brunton	9–14 August 2008	33	–	36	3
TV3–TNS	14–20 August 2008	31	–	34	3
Herald–DigiPoll	3–25 August 2008	45	–	46.6	5.6
Poll	Date	Helen Clark	Don Brash	John Key	Winston Peters
One News-Colmar Brunton	6–11 September 2008	31	0.1	40	3
Fairfax Media–Nielsen	10–16 September 2008	30	–	41	2
Herald–DigiPoll	15–24 September 2008	43.1	–	45.5	4
TV3–TNS	Released 28 September 2008	32	–	34	–
One News-Colmar Brunton	27 September–2 October 2008	31	–	41	3
TV3–TNS	Released 10 October 2008	31.6	–	31	–
One News-Colmar Brunton	4–9 October 2008	31	–	39	2
Fairfax Media–Nielsen	8–14 October 2008	35	–	43	–
One News-Colmar Brunton	11–16 October 2008	34	0.1	40	2
TV3–TNS	Released 23 October 2008	36.3	–	36.3	–
Herald–DigiPoll	15–22 October 2008	45.4	–	44.8	4.0
One News-Colmar Brunton	18–23 October 2008	37	-	38	3
One News-Colmar Brunton	1–5 November 2008	36	–	40	1

== See also ==
- Opinion polling for the 2005 New Zealand general election
- Opinion polling for the 2011 New Zealand general election
- Candidates in the 2008 New Zealand general election by electorate
