= Kerry Bevin =

New Zealand politician

Kerry Bevin was leader of The Republic of New Zealand Party, and was a list candidate for the 2005 and 2008 general elections.

The party received the lowest number of votes for any party in both the 2005 and 2008 general elections.

Bevin is a fathers' rights and Men's movement campaigner.
