= Melanie Mark-Shadbolt =

New Zealand sociologist

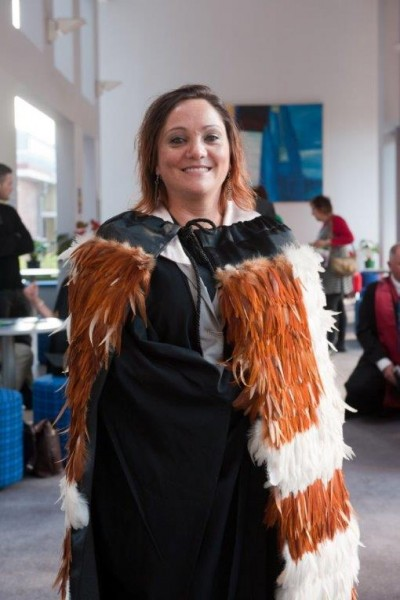
- Mark-Shadbolt in 2019
- Born: Melanie Jane Mark; 1977 or 1978 (age 47–48); Waiouru, New Zealand
- Education: University of Canterbury
- Spouse: Scott Shadbolt
- Relatives: Ron Mark (father)
- Awards: Public Policy award, Companion of the Royal Society of New Zealand

Melanie Jane Mark-Shadbolt CRSNZ (née Mark; born 1977 or 1978) is a New Zealand environmental sociologist, and works at the science and public policy interface, specialising in environmental policy. She was the winner of the Public Policy award in the 2021 New Zealand Women of Influence Awards.

== Early life and family ==
Mark-Shadbolt is Māori, and affiliates to Ngāti Porou, Ngāti Kahungunu ki Wairarapa, Te Arawa (Ngāti Kea Ngāti Tuara), Te Atiawa, Ngāti Raukawa and Ngāti Tūwharetoa. The daughter of Ron Mark, she was born in Waiouru, and grew up in an army family, so moved around, including a period in Oman. Mark-Shadbolt completed a Bachelor of Arts degree in political science at the University of Canterbury in 2002. She married Scott Shadbolt, a firefighter.

== Career ==
Mark-Shadbolt worked for Te Rūnanga o Ngāi Tahu until 2008.

In 2018 Mark-Shadbolt was appointed chief advisor Māori at the Ministry for the Environment, and she later rose to deputy secretary for Māori rights and interests. She led the creation of the Ministry's strategy for building capability for engaging with Māori. Mark-Shadbolt is involved with two of the National Science Challenges: she is co-director Māori of New Zealand's Biological Heritage, and co-chair of the governance group for Resilience to Nature's Challenges. She is Māori research manager for the BioProtection Research Centre of Research Excellence, and involved in the Ngā Pae o Te Māramatanga Centre of Research Excellence. She is the co-founder, chief executive of the Māori environmental not-for-profit, Te Tira Whakamātaki, which provides support to boards and governance groups.

In the 2017 New Zealand general election, Mark-Shadbolt stood unsuccessfully in the Christchurch East electorate for New Zealand First. She had previously stood for the same party in the Waimakariri electorate in 2008.

Mark-Shadbolt was a finalist in the Environmental champion section of the 2019 New Zealand Women of Influence Awards, and won the Public Policy section in the 2021 awards. In 2026, Mark-Shadbolt was elected a Companion of the Royal Society Te Apārangi for "a sustained nationally significant contribution at the intersection of indigenous knowledge systems, environmental science, and science policy".
