= Tony Christiansen =

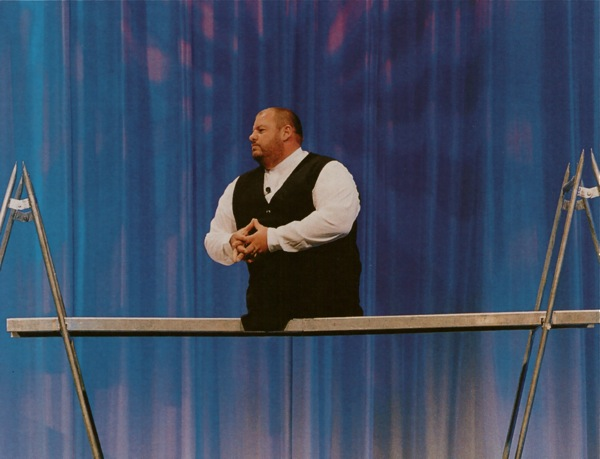
- Christiansen at the Million Dollar Round Table, Toronto Canada.
- Born: Anthony S. Christiansen; 23 October 1958 (age 68); Tauranga, New Zealand
- Occupations: Inspirational Speaker; Motivational speaker
- Years active: 1998–present

Anthony (Tony) Steven Christiansen (born 23 October 1958) is a motivational and inspirational speaker from New Zealand who lost his legs as a result of a train accident in his childhood.

He has challenged himself in numerous sporting and business areas, is the author of several best-selling books and has appeared in a number of TV documentaries.

In his presentations, Christiansen starts by climbing a 1.5-metre high scaffolding and exudes a strong presence. His theme is self belief; "Your attitude determines your altitude in life". He shares his life story and the secrets to his success and encourages his audience to set their own challenges, rather than accept the limitations imposed by their own attitudes and other people's perception.

== Early life ==
Christiansen was born in Tauranga, New Zealand. His father Bernard worked in a timber yard and his mother Doreen was a homemaker who immigrated to New Zealand from England after the World War II. He is the youngest of 3 siblings which include brother Frank and sister Susan.

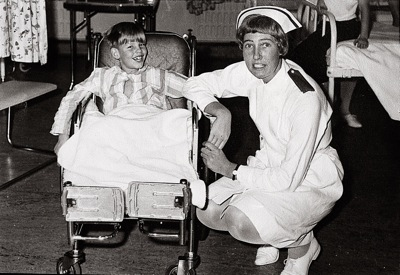
Christiansen days after his accident.

=== Hit by a train ===
On the morning of 3 June 1967 which was Queen's Birthday weekend, Christiansen had followed friend Gary Winters and his father Mick to the railway yard near Te Maunga to bag coal for sale to raise money for charity. As the two children were crossing the tracks, the train shunted backwards dragging Christiansen under and the dual set of wheels ran over his legs almost severing them.

As a result of this accident, both his legs could not be saved and were amputated. 48 hours after the accident, Christiansen was found sitting up in a wheelchair and in good spirits.

== Achievements ==
After his wounds healed, Christiansen moved forward. His achievements following the accident made him one of New Zealand's notable motivational speakers and one of the world's most interesting.

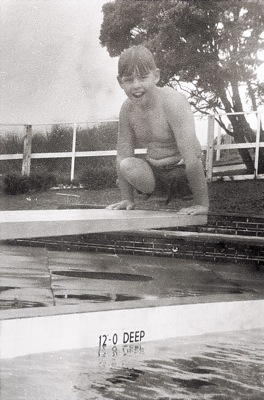
Christiansen young with no legs but a very able swimmer.

=== Confidence in the water ===
After his accident, many people including strangers, visited Christiansen and wanted to help. Among them, 2 people made a significant difference to Christiansen's life. They were swimming coaches Dave Franklin and Allan Guthrie.

Even before his accident, Christiansen hated water but Franklin and Guthrie were very persistent in teaching the now disabled young boy how to swim. Within 5 months of his first lesson, less than a year after his accident, Christiansen at 10 years of age, swam a mile non-stop.

The following year, Christiansen joined the Tauranga Swimming Club and continued to improve as a swimmer while he became physically stronger. He set a goal to compete in the Tauranga mayor's annual sponsored swimming race held by the Lions Club.

On 6 May 1971, Christiansen came just behind the mayor Bob Owen in that 2-mile (3.2 km) race and in February 1974, he beat the mayor in the Annual Harbour "Swimathon".

=== Surf Lifesaving ===
During his years in school, Christiansen was alienated from most of the physical activities. In his fifth form, week-long school camps were held, none of which he could participate in. As a result, his old swimming coach Dave Franklin invited him to join the surf lifesaving camp at the Omanu surf club. By the end of that week, Christiansen earned his surf lifesaving Bronze Medallion (New Zealand and Australia) and joined the Omanu Pacific Surf Lifesaving Club.

In 1978, Christiansen was granted a Special Achievement Award from World Life Saving which today is known as the International Life Saving Federation. In the same year, he gained his instructor's certificate.

Christiansen remained a member of the Omanu Pacific Surf Lifesaving Club and worked as a surf lifeguard until the age of 23. He was also the club's canoe team captain. Throughout his career as a surf lifesaver, Christiansen made 33 rescues. He was believed to be the only disabled lifeguard in the Southern Hemisphere.

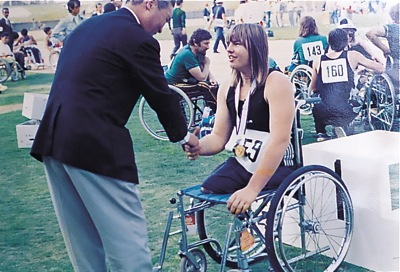
Only 16 years of age at the 1975 FESPIC Games, winning silver in the 100-metre sprints, gold in javelin and swimming.

=== Athletics Career & Representing New Zealand ===
Around the same time Christiansen got into surf lifesaving, he also became involved in the disabled sports movement. It wasn't long before he set a goal to represent New Zealand internationally.

Christiansen trained for the National Disabled Games in Wellington and competed in wheelchair racing, shot put, discus, javelin and swimming. In 1972, he was nominated for a New Zealand Herald Junior Sports Award which he did not win but was recognised by the judges who included Yvette Corlett (1952 Olympic long jump champion), Murray Halberg and Don Oliver. In 1976, he was nominated again and this time he won the award for paraplegic sports.

During his career in athletics, Christiansen held several local records and was the area pentathlon champion in 1978.

Christiansen's other international sports achievements include:

- FESPIC Games, Oita Japan 1975 - Gold in javelin and 50 metres freestyle swimming; Silver in 100 metres wheelchair dash.
- FESPIC Games, Sydney Australia 1977 – Gold in shot put, discus, javelin, pentathlon and 100 metres swim; silver in 50 metres freestyle swimming; bronze in snooker.
- FESPIC Games, Hong Kong 1982 – Gold in discus, silver in javelin and basketball, bronze in shot put.

Throughout his athletics career, Christiansen represented New Zealand 5 times at the World Games, FESPIC Games and the Paralympic Qualifying Games and won 35 medals including 12 golds, 17 silver and 6 bronze medals.

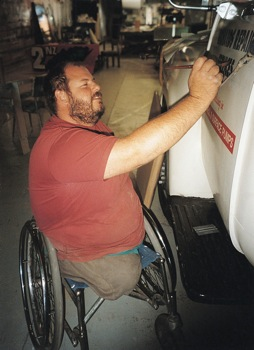
Christiansen at his best trade as a signwriter.

=== The Successful Business ===
In the book about his life, Race You to the Top, Christiansen described his performance in school as "having artistic talent but never very academic".

While at school, Christiansen worked part-time doing signwriting jobs on stockcars, with the Woolworths supermarket chain being among the clients. These credentials later led to a job as a ticket writer in New World (supermarket). At the same time, he also worked for the Tauranga Museum where he learned many new skills.

Christiansen tried applying for jobs with signwriting companies but his numerous attempts failed. He eventually hassled Lance Styles, the owner of Commercial Signs, enough to land a job. Within 3 months, he had proven himself and impressed Styles who made him foreman.

Christiansen later left Commercial Signs. In 1985, he returned and took a stake in the company. In 1995, he bought over the rest of the shareholding and became the sole owner of the company. For the next 2 years, he turned it into one of the largest commercial signwriting business in New Zealand and sold it in 1997 to begin his career as a professional speaker.

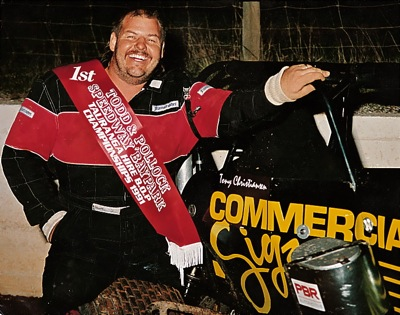
Christiansen won the race at Baypark Speedway.

=== Motor Sports ===
From a young age, Christiansen fell in love with cars and motor sports, picking up go-karting at the age of 12. He gave up the sport when he took up surf lifesaving but went back into motor sports at 26 and therein started competing on the race track.

In order to drive, Christiansen integrates a hand control which are motorcycle-style twist throttle attached to a handle, in all his cars. He names his midget race car "Toenails" and over the years have won several races locally at the Baypark Speedway and domestically. He also competed in the Pre-65 races in a Ford Zephyr Mark III and made his sprint car debut at Western Springs Stadium in November 1996.

Christiansen also participated in off-road races. His race cars are usually a signature yellow colour.

In 2015, Christiansen returned to circuit racing and joined the Star Touring Car series. His car has a Holden body and runs on a Suzuki GSXR engine. He won the 2016 series with the highest points in the Star Car category.

=== Martial Arts ===
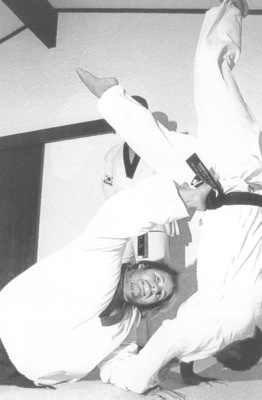
Training with Master Kesi O'Neil and mastering the art of Tae Kwon Do.

Christiansen was introduced to martial arts in 1986 through one of his children who was taking Tae Kwon Do lessons and he decided to aim for a black belt. He trained under Allan France and later under Master Kesi O'Neill after France moved to Australia.

He obtained his Second Degree Black Belt in 1990 and decided to move on to other things.

=== Pilot & Aviation History ===
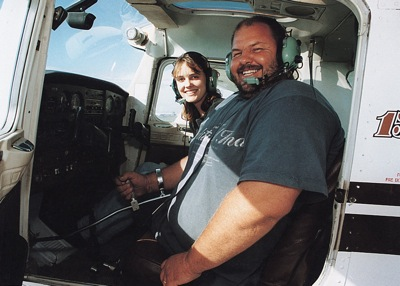
Christiansen flies the Cessna 172 at Tauranga Airport.

Christiansen's introduction to aviation started with radio-controlled planes which remains a passionate hobby. He had met and was taught to fly by Phil Hooker, the Bay of Plenty Flight Centre's chief flying instructor whom Christiansen taught to fly radio-controlled planes.

Christiansen flies a Cessna 172 with a portable hand control to move rudders and apply the brakes.

On 24 March 1998, Christiansen created aviation history when he became the first disabled New Zealander to fly solo. According to a Civil Aviation Authority spokeswoman, Christiansen was the first person who had learned to fly from scratch with a disability.

=== Kilimanjaro ===
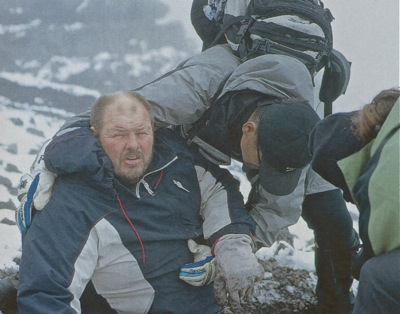
Christiansen at the summit of Mount Kilimanjaro.

In 2002, Christiansen was invited by Korean Broadcasting System to scale Mount Kilimanjaro with 2 other Koreans – Soo Young, a blind young woman and Hong Bin, an experienced mountaineer who lost all his fingers to frostbite on a climbing expedition in Canada.

After about 2 weeks of preparations and media interviews in Korea, the group departed for Dar es Salaam, Nairobi and travelled onwards to Arusha in northern Tanzania. They spent 3 days filming in a village with the Maasai people.

Christiansen climbed Mount Kilimanjaro in his mountain-climbing wheelchair as much as he could and the rest of the journey on his backside with only a pair of hi-tech, New Zealand-designed vinyl pants and a pair of gloves protecting him from the sharp volcanic rocks.

The group reached the summit of the mountain on 21 December 2002. Christiansen reached Gilman's Point, the second highest peak at 5,685 metres. He did not reach Uhuru, the highest peak at 5,895 metres as he admitted in his book that he could not physically go on through the incredibly steep and rough terrain at the summit. It was also snowing and raining and it was getting dark, all making it too dangerous to carry on.

It took Christiansen 10 hours to reach Gilman's Point from Kibo Hut which is the last station on the Marangu Route, and only 2 hours to descent.

Christiansen's Kilimanjaro experience is told in detail in his second book "Attitude Plus!". He considers his climb to the summit of Mount Kilimanjaro one of his proudest moment.

=== World's Fastest Amputee ===
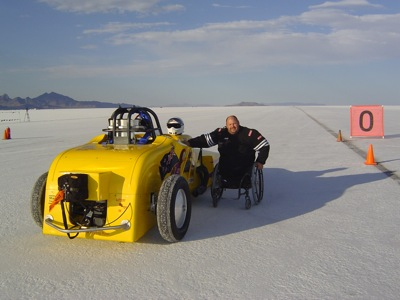
Christiansen at the Bonneville Salt Flats with his dragster.

In 2008, having watched the movie "The World's Fastest Indian" 27 times on Air New Zealand flights, Christiansen was inspired to become "The World's Fastest Amputee". He set a goal to attempt to reach 200 mph (321 km/h) on the famed Bonneville Salt Flats in Utah, United States.

He set about modifying his C/Altered drag racer designed for a quarter-mile strip into a salt flats racer that will run 8 miles (13 km) on the vast salt flats.

Christiansen's efforts were filmed by TV NZ for a documentary programme which captured the emotional highs and lows of his Speedweek venture. He did not achieve this targeted speed of 200 mph (320 km/h), instead topped at 182 mph (293 km/h).

=== Snow Sports ===
In 2010 at Whakapapa skifield, Christiansen met American adaptive ski instructor Travis Thiele, who works with the National Ability Center in the United States and took his first lesson in adaptive skiing. Christiansen did not fall. Thiele described Christiansen as "strong as an ox" and admitted that he had never in his career met a first-time adaptive skier who did not fall on his first attempt.

Through Thiele, Christiansen was introduced to members of the Paralympic Committee of the International Bobsleigh & Skeleton Federation (FIBT) who were campaigning to introduce a two-man adaptive bobsled competition as a demonstration sport at the 2014 Winter Paralympics in Sochi, Russia. In January 2012, Christiansen participated in the first ever International Introduction and Development School for Adaptive Bobsled and Skeleton hosted by the United States Bobsled and Skeleton Federation and the Utah Olympic Park Track. He took the position and qualified as a bobsled driver.

Christiansen is officially a member of FIBT representing New Zealand.

=== Handcycling ===
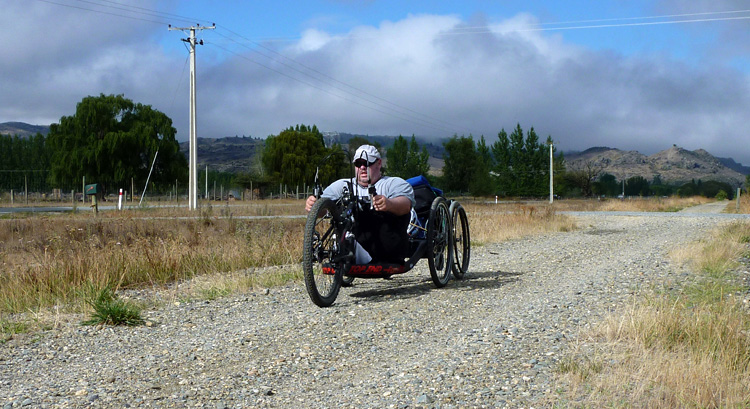
Christiansen riding the Otago Central Rail Trail towing his wheelchair.

Christiansen rides his handcycles regularly as a form of exercise. In January 2015, he took part in the Round The Mountain Paracycling Challenge with 5 other handcyclist, riding the steep leg 4 of 6 legs. The challenge was a 150 km route around Mount Taranaki in New Plymouth.

The following month, Christiansen attempted and successfully rode the entire length of the Otago Central Rail Trail. He described the effort to be harder than he had expected as either his front steering wheel or both his back wheels were always grinding into the loose rocks. This resulted in him riding 8 to 11 hours a day. He started the ride in Clyde on 21 February and completed his feat in Middlemarch on 25 February 2015.

== Politics ==
Christiansen was a candidate for the Bay of Plenty (New Zealand electorate) for the Kiwi Party in the 2008 General Election. He did not win the seat, garnering 2,258 votes, losing to incumbent Tony Ryall.

In 2010, Christiansen put his name forward for a seat in the Tauranga City Council local body elections. He won and was the highest polling at-large candidate with 10,890 votes. He was not re-elected in the 2013 elections.
