= 2005 New Zealand general election =

- 17 September 2005

All 121 seats in the House of Representatives, including one overhang seat 61 seats needed for a majority
- Opinion polls
- Registered: 2,847,396
- Turnout: 2,304,005; 80.92% (▲3.94%)
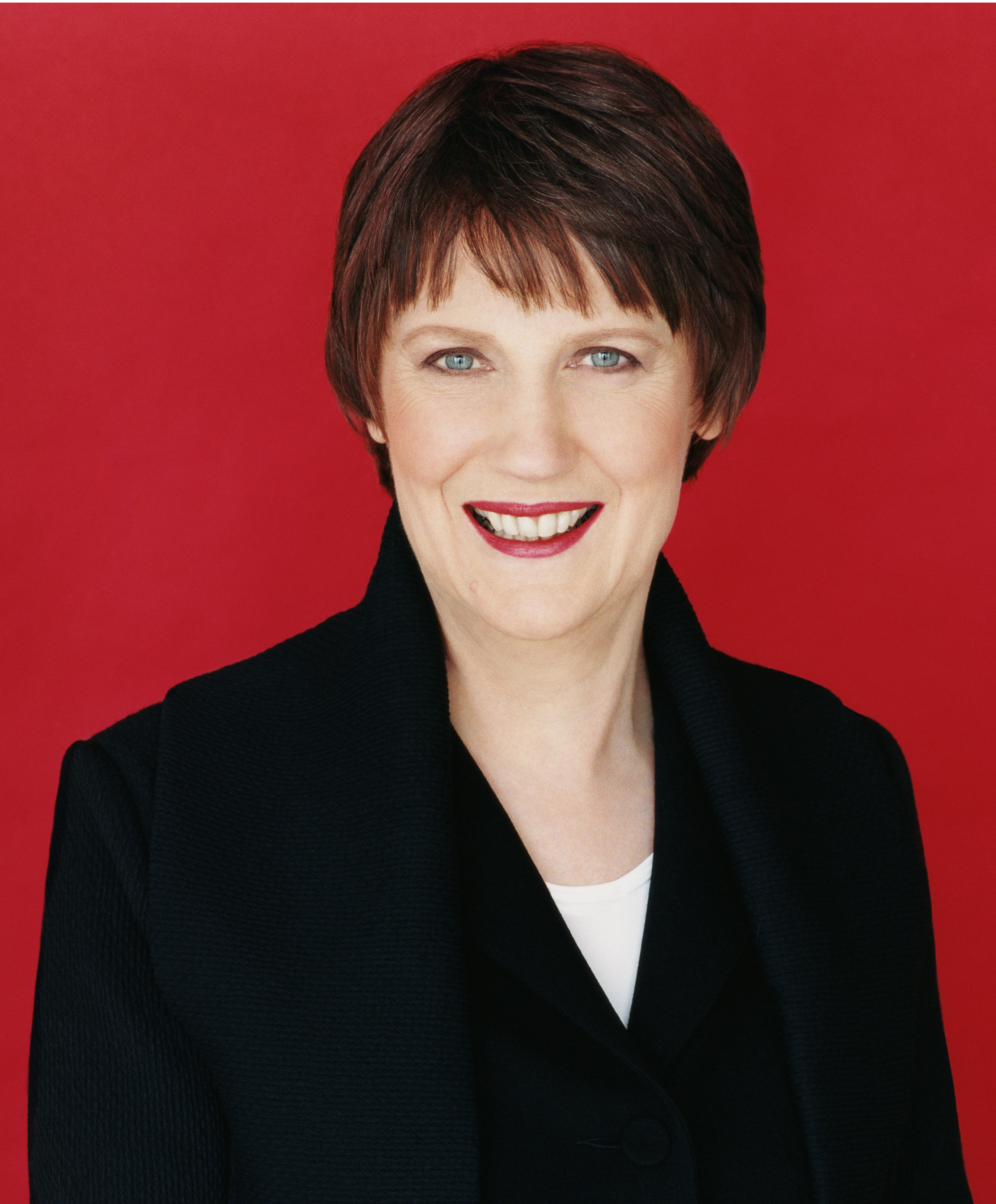

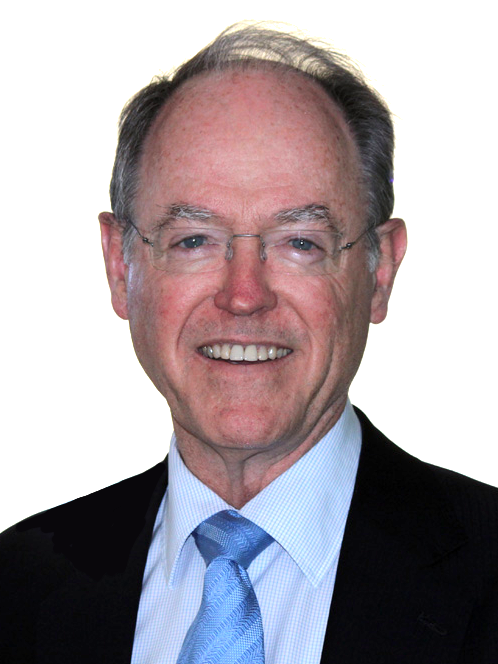

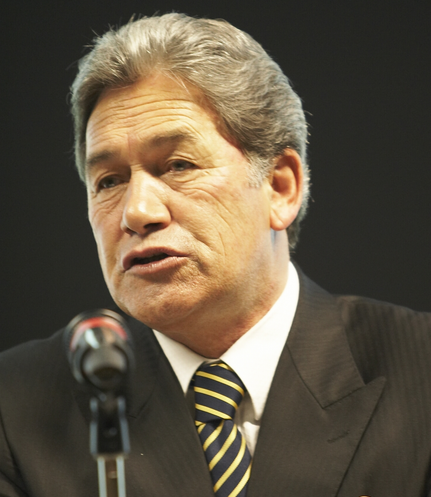

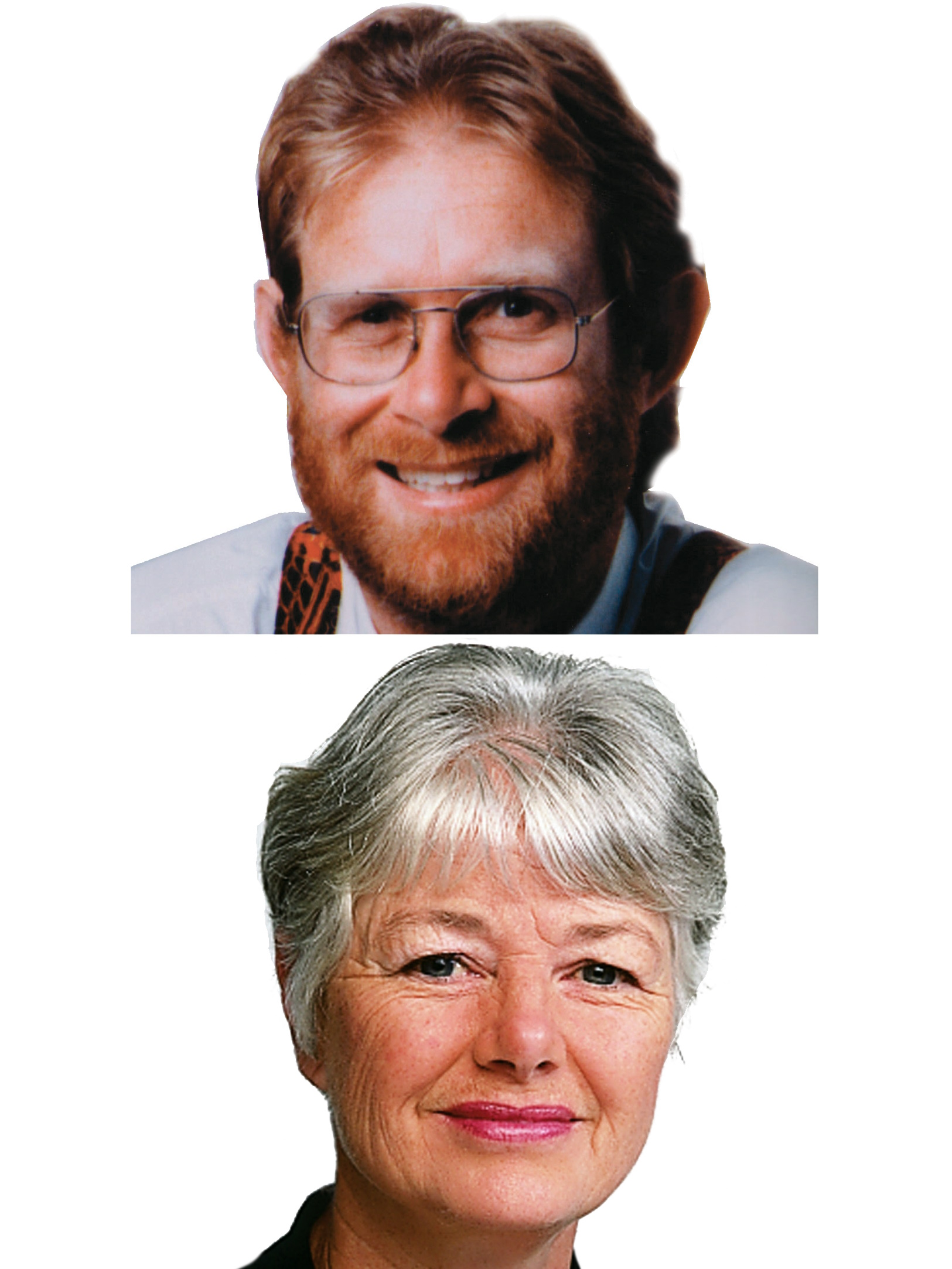

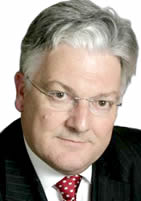

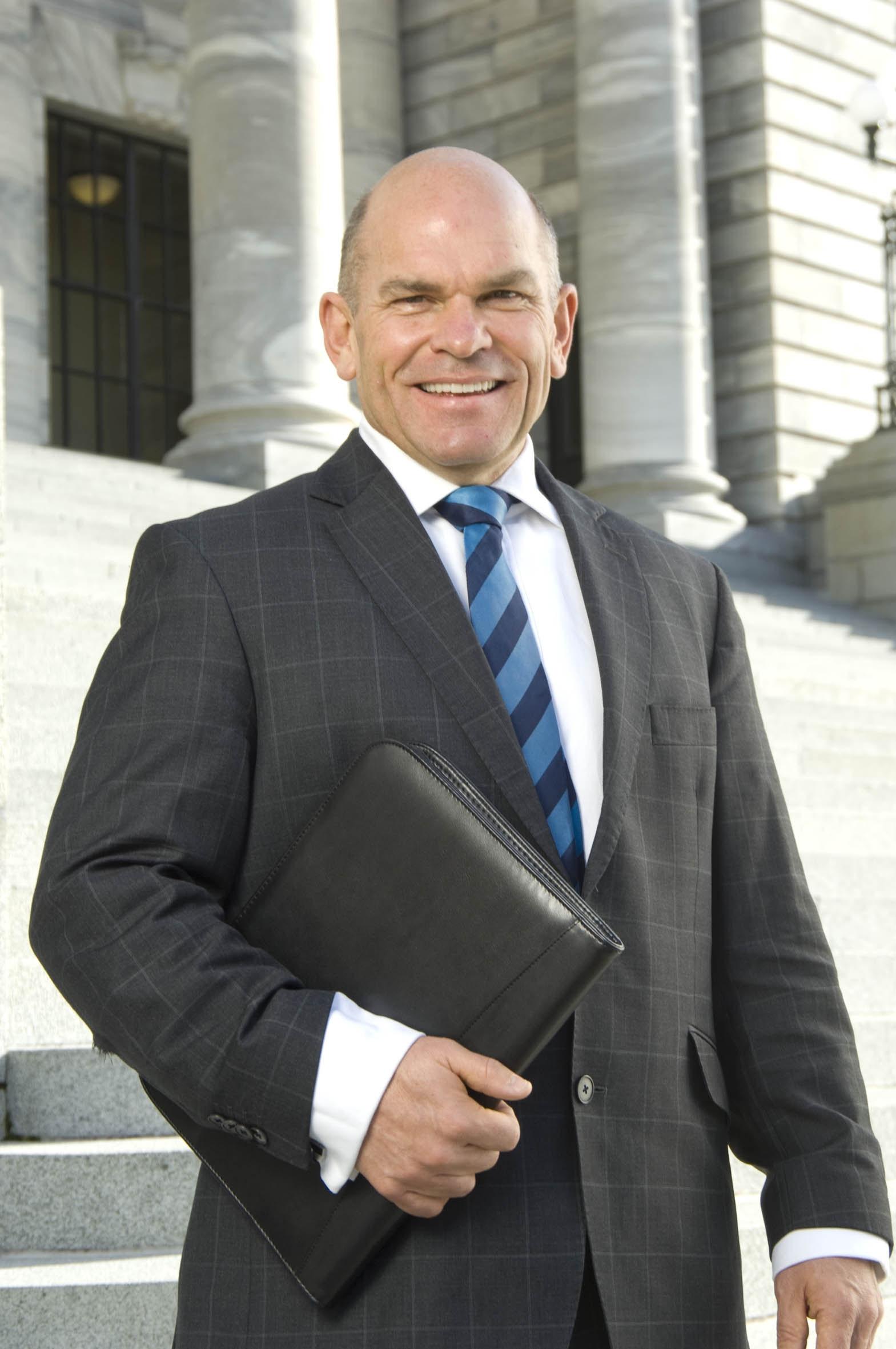

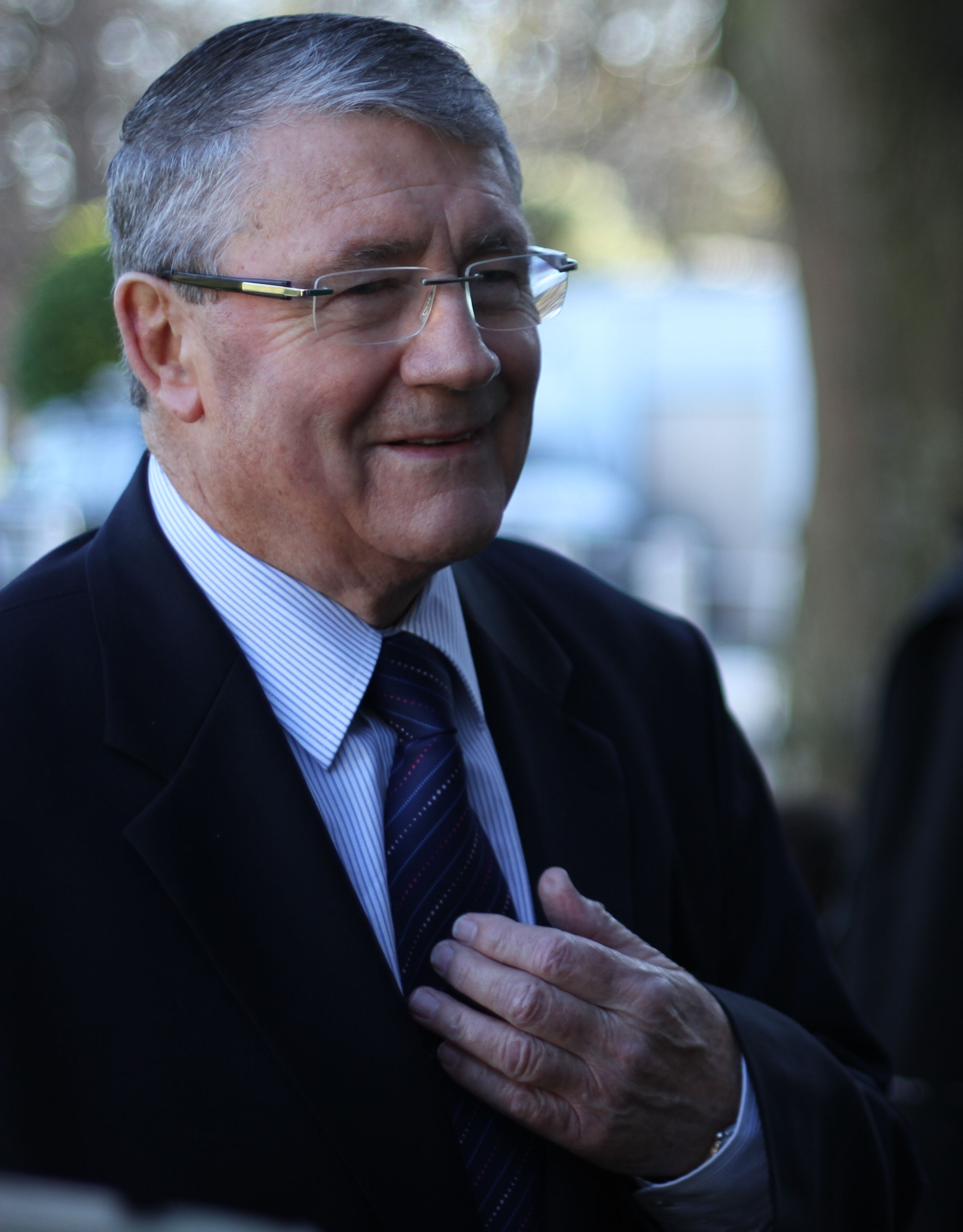
	First party	Second party	Third party
Leader	Helen Clark	Don Brash	Winston Peters
Party	Labour	National	NZ First
Leader since	1 December 1993	28 October 2003	18 July 1993
Leader's seat	Mount Albert	List	List (lost Tauranga)
Last election	52 seats, 41.26%	27 seats, 20.93%	13 seats, 10.38%
Seats before	51	27	13
Seats won	50	48	7
Seat change	▼1	▲21	▼6
Party vote	935,319	889,813	130,115
Percentage	41.10%	39.10%	5.72%
Swing	▼0.16 pp	▲18.17 pp	▼4.66 pp
	Fourth party	Fifth party	Sixth party
Leader	Rod Donald; Jeanette Fitzsimons	Tariana Turia; Pita Sharples	Peter Dunne
Party	Green	Māori Party	United Future New Zealand
Leader since	21 May 1995	7 July 2004	16 November 2000
Leader's seat	List; List	Te Tai Hauāuru; Tāmaki Makaurau	Ohariu-Belmont
Last election	9 seats, 7.00%	–	8 seats, 6.69%
Seats before	9	1	8
Seats won	6	4	3
Seat change	▼3	▲3	▼5
Party vote	120,521	48,263	60,860
Percentage	5.30%	2.12%	2.67%
Swing	▼1.70 pp	new	▼4.02 pp
	Seventh party	Eighth party
Leader	Rodney Hide	Jim Anderton
Party	ACT	Progressive
Leader since	13 June 2004	27 July 2002
Leader's seat	Epsom	Wigram
Last election	9 seats, 7.14%	2 seats, 1.70%
Seats before	9	2
Seats won	2	1
Seat change	▼7	▼1
Party vote	34,469	26,441
Percentage	1.51%	1.16%
Swing	▼5.63 pp	▼0.54 pp
- Results by electorate, shaded by winning margin
Prime Minister and coalition before election
Helen Clark (Labour)
Labour—Progressive (C&S: United Future)
Subsequent Prime Minister and coalition
Helen Clark (Labour)
Labour—Progressive (C&S: United Future, NZ First, Green)

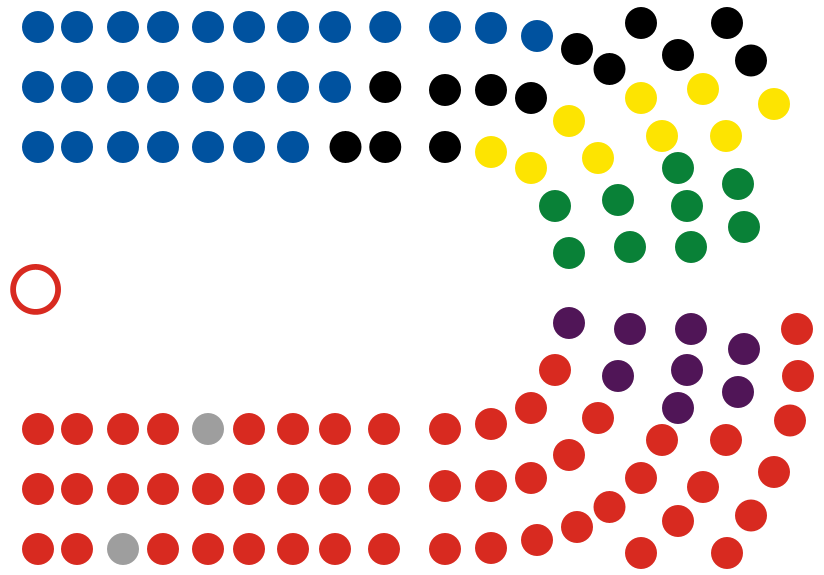
Parliamentary makeup prior to the 2005 election. Government: Labour (51) Green (9) United Future (8) Progressive (2) Opposition: National (27) NZ First (13) ACT (9) Māori (1)

The 2005 New Zealand general election was held on 17 September 2005 to determine the membership of the 48th New Zealand Parliament. Voters elected 121 MPs to the New Zealand House of Representatives – 69 from single-member electorates and 52 from party lists, including an overhang of one seat.

No party won a majority, but the Labour Party of Prime Minister Helen Clark secured two seats more than its nearest rival, the National Party, led by Don Brash. With the exception of the newly formed Māori Party, which took four Māori electorates from Labour, most of the other parties polled lower than in the previous election, losing votes and seats.

Brash deferred conceding defeat until 1 October, when National's election-night 49 seats fell to 48 after special votes were counted. The official count increased the Māori Party share of the party vote above 2%, entitling them to three rather than two seats from the party vote. With four electorate seats, the election night overhang of two seats was reduced to one, and as National had the 120th seat allocated under the party vote, National lost one list seat (that of Katrina Shanks) that they appeared to have won on election night.

The election was a strong recovery for National, which won 21 more seats than at the 2002 election, where it suffered its worst result in its history, and the highest party vote percentage for the party since 1990; indeed, National saw its first vote share gain since 1990. Despite its resurgence, National failed to displace Labour as the largest party in Parliament. National's gains apparently came mainly at the expense of smaller parties, while Labour won only two seats less than in 2002.

On 17 October, Clark announced a new coalition agreement that saw the return of her minority government coalition with the Progressive Party, with confidence and supply support from New Zealand First and from United Future. New Zealand First parliamentary leader Winston Peters and United Future parliamentary leader Peter Dunne became ministers of the Crown outside Cabinet, Peters as Minister of Foreign Affairs and Dunne as Minister of Revenue. The Green Party, which had supported Labour before the election, received no cabinet post (see below), but gained several concessions from the coalition on matters such as energy and transport, and agreed to support the government on matters of confidence and supply. This was the second time that Labour won three consecutive elections, and to date it is the only time it has won three consecutive peacetime elections.

== The election ==
The total votes cast in 2005 was 2,304,005 (2,164,595 & 139,510 Māori). Turnout was 80.92% of those on the rolls, or 77.05% of voting age population. Turnout was higher than in the previous 2002 election (72.5% and 76.98% respectively), and the Māori roll turnout at 67.07% was significantly higher than 2002 (57.5%).

In the election 739 candidates stood, and there were 19 registered parties with party lists. Of the candidates, 525 were electorate and list, 72 were electorate only and 142 were list only. All but 37 represented registered parties (on the list or in the electorate or both). Only 35 candidates from registered parties chose to stand as an electorate candidate only. 71% of candidates (523) were male and 29% (216) female; the same percentages as in 2002.

Labour had achieved a third term in office for the first time since 1943.

=== MPs retiring in 2005 ===
Eight MPs intended to retire at the end of the 47th Parliament.

Party	Name	Electorate
ACT	Deborah Coddington	(List)
ACT	Richard Prebble	(List)
Green	Ian Ewen-Street	(List)
National	Lynda Scott	Kaikoura
National	Roger Sowry	(List)
Labour	Helen Duncan	(List)
Labour	Janet Mackey	East Coast
Labour	Mark Peck	Invercargill

== Detailed results ==
=== Parliamentary parties ===
Summary of the 17 September 2005 election for the House of Representatives
Party	Party vote			Electorate vote			Seats			
Party	Votes	%	Change (pp)	Votes	%	Change (pp)	List	Electorate	Total	+/-
Labour	935,319	41.10	▼0.16	902,072	40.35	▼4.34	19	31	50	▼2
National	889,813	39.10	▲18.17	902,874	40.38	▲9.84	17	31	48	▲21
NZ First	130,115	5.72	▼4.66	78,117	3.49	▼0.49	7	0	7	▼6
Green	120,521	5.30	▼1.70	92,164	4.12	▼1.23	6	0	6	▼3
Māori Party	48,263	2.12	new	75,076	3.36	new	0	4	4	new
United Future	60,860	2.67	▼4.02	63,486	2.84	▼1.52	2	1	3	▼5
ACT	34,469	1.51	▼5.63	44,071	1.97	▼1.58	1	1	2	▼7
Progressive	26,441	1.16	▼0.54	36,638	1.64	▼0.20	0	1	1	▼1
Destiny	14,210	0.62	new	17,608	0.79	new	0	0	0	new
Legalise Cannabis	5,748	0.25	▼0.39	2,601	0.12	▼0.05	0	0	0	Steady
Christian Heritage	2,821	0.12	▼1.23	1,296	0.06	▼1.99	0	0	0	Steady
Alliance	1,641	0.07	▼1.20	1,901	0.09	▼1.60		0	0	Steady
Family Rights	1,178	0.05	new	1,045	0.05	new	0	0	0	new
Democrats	1,079	0.05	new	565	0.03	new	0	0	0	new
Libertarianz	946	0.04	▲0.04	781	0.03	Steady	0	0	0	Steady
Direct Democracy	782	0.03	new	1,934	0.09	new		0	0	new
99 MP	601	0.03	new	—	—	—	0	0	0	new
One NZ	478	0.02	▼0.07	214	0.01	▼0.12		0	0	Steady
RONZ	344	0.02	new	131	0.01	new	0	0	0	new
Unregistered parties	—	—	—	1,466	0.07	▼0.12	0	0	0	Steady
Independent	—	—	—	11,829	0.53	▼0.22	0	0	0	Steady
Valid votes	2,275,629	98.77	▼0.07	2,235,869	97.04	▼0.05				
Informal votes	10,561	0.46	▲0.04	24,801	1.08	▼0.21				
Disallowed votes	17,815	0.77	▲0.03	43,335	1.88	▲0.26				
Total	2,304,005	100		2,304,005	100		52	69	121	▲1
Eligible voters and Turnout	2,847,396	80.92	▲3.94	2,847,396	80.92	▲3.94				

The election saw an 81% voter turnout.

The results of the election give a Gallagher index of disproportionality of 1.11.

=== Votes summary ===
Constituency Vote
National	40.38%
Labour	40.35%
Green	4.12%
NZ First	3.49%
Māori	3.36%
United Future	2.84%
ACT	1.97%
Progressive	1.64%
Others	1.85%

Party Vote
Labour	41.10%
National	39.10%
NZ First	5.72%
Green	5.30%
United Future	2.67%
Māori	2.12%
ACT	1.51%
Progressive	1.16%
Others	1.31%

Parliament seats
Labour	41.32%
National	39.67%
NZ First	5.79%
Green	4.96%
Māori	3.31%
United Future	2.48%
ACT	1.65%
Progressive	0.83%

=== Electorate results ===
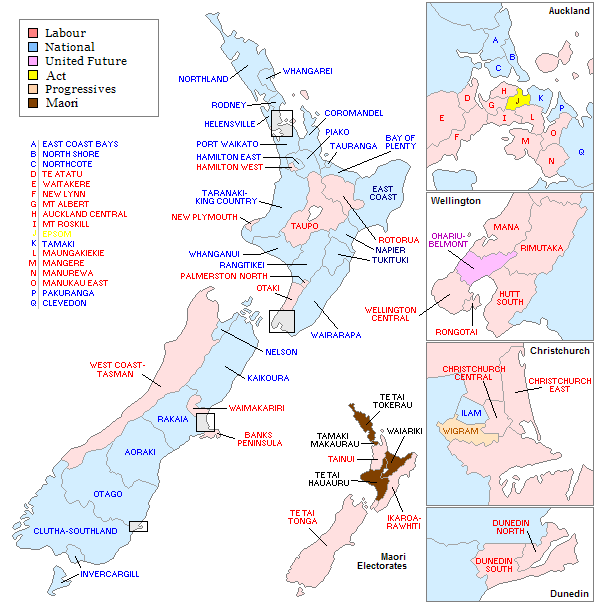
Party affiliation of winning electorate candidates.

The table below shows the results of the 2005 general election:

Key:

Labour	National	ACT	United Future
NZ First	Progressive	Māori Party

Electorate results for the 2005 New Zealand general election
Electorate	Incumbent	Winner	Majority	Runner up
Aoraki	Jim Sutton	Jo Goodhew	6,937	Jim Sutton
Auckland Central	Judith Tizard		3,884	Pansy Wong
Banks Peninsula	Ruth Dyson		1,923	David Carter
Bay of Plenty	Tony Ryall		13,584	Pauline Scott
Christchurch Central	Tim Barnett		7,836	Nicky Wagner
Christchurch East	Lianne Dalziel		11,973	David Round
Clevedon	Judith Collins		12,871	Dave Hereora
Clutha-Southland	Bill English		13,032	David Talbot
Coromandel	Sandra Goudie		10,578	Max Purnell
Dunedin North	Pete Hodgson		7,630	Katherine Rich
Dunedin South	David Benson-Pope		10,640	Conway Powell
East Coast	Janet Mackey	Anne Tolley	1,219	Moana Mackey
East Coast Bays	Murray McCully		7,286	Hamish McCracken
Epsom	Richard Worth	Rodney Hide	3,102	Richard Worth
Hamilton East	Dianne Yates	David Bennett	5,298	Dianne Yates
Hamilton West	Martin Gallagher		825	Tim Macindoe
Helensville	John Key		12,778	Judy Lawley
Hutt South	Trevor Mallard		5,740	Rosemarie Thomas
Ilam	Gerry Brownlee		7,821	Julian Blanchard
Invercargill	Mark Peck	Eric Roy	2,052	Wayne Harpur
Kaikoura	Lynda Scott	Colin King	4,675	Brendon Burns
Mana	Winnie Laban		6,734	Chris Finlayson
Mangere	Taito Phillip Field		16,020	Clem Simich
Manukau East	Ross Robertson		9,890	Ken Yee
Manurewa	George Hawkins		11,707	Fepulea'i Aiono
Maungakiekie	Mark Gosche		6,450	Paul Goldsmith
Mount Albert	Helen Clark		14,749	Ravi Musuku
Mount Roskill	Phil Goff		9,895	Jackie Blue
Napier	Russell Fairbrother	Chris Tremain	3,591	Russell Fairbrother
Nelson	Nick Smith		10,226	Jen McCutcheon
New Lynn	David Cunliffe		8,078	Mita Harris
New Plymouth	Harry Duynhoven		5,439	Moira Irving
North Shore	Wayne Mapp		9,701	Phil Twyford
Northcote	Ann Hartley	Jonathan Coleman	2,383	Ann Hartley
Northland	John Carter		9,275	Shane Jones
Ohariu-Belmont	Peter Dunne		7,702	Charles Chauvel
Otago	David Parker	Jacqui Dean	1,995	David Parker
Otaki	Darren Hughes		382	Nathan Guy
Pakuranga	Maurice Williamson		9,582	Michael Wood
Palmerston North	Steve Maharey		5,500	Malcolm Plimmer
Piako	Lindsay Tisch		8,351	Sue Moroney
Port Waikato	Paul Hutchison		13,498	Louisa Wall
Rakaia	Brian Connell		10,448	Tony Milne
Rangitikei	Simon Power		9,660	Marilyn Brown
Rimutaka	Paul Swain		8,277	Mike Leddy
Rodney	Lockwood Smith		11,536	Tony Dunlop
Rongotai	Annette King		12,638	Nicola Young
Rotorua	Steve Chadwick		662	Gil Stehbens
Tamaki	Clem Simich	Allan Peachey	9,510	Leila Boyle
Taranaki-King Country	Shane Ardern		13,118	Maryan Street
Taupo	Mark Burton		1,285	Weston Kirton
Tauranga	Winston Peters	Bob Clarkson	730	Winston Peters
Te Atatu	Chris Carter		10,447	Tau Henare
Tukituki	Rick Barker	Craig Foss	2,402	Rick Barker
Waimakariri	Clayton Cosgrove		5,606	Kate Wilkinson
Wairarapa	Georgina Beyer	John Hayes	2,752	Denise MacKenzie
Waitakere	Lynne Pillay		4,942	Paula Bennett
Wellington Central	Marian Hobbs		6,180	Mark Blumsky
West Coast-Tasman	Damien O'Connor		2,154	Chris Auchinvole
Whanganui	Jill Pettis	Chester Borrows	2,402	Jill Pettis
Whangarei	Phil Heatley		9,089	Paul Chalmers
Wigram	Jim Anderton		8,548	Allison Lomax
Māori electorates
Electorate	Incumbent	Winner	Majority	Runner up
Ikaroa-Rāwhiti	Parekura Horomia		1,932	Atareta Poananga
Tainui	Nanaia Mahuta		1,860	Angeline Greensill
Tāmaki Makaurau	John Tamihere	Pita Sharples	2,127	John Tamihere
Te Tai Hauāuru	Tariana Turia		5,113	Errol Mason
Te Tai Tokerau	Dover Samuels	Hone Harawira	3,613	Dover Samuels
Te Tai Tonga	Mahara Okeroa		2,503	Monte Ohia
Waiariki	Mita Ririnui	Te Ururoa Flavell	2,871	Mita Ririnui

=== List results ===
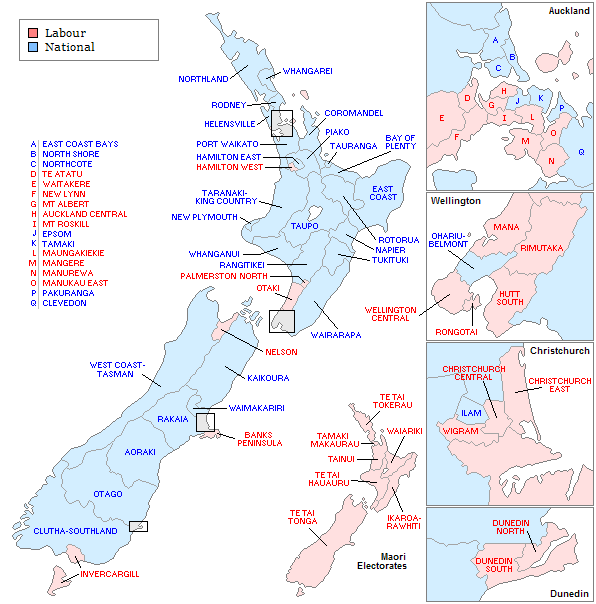
Highest polling party in each electorate.

MPs returned via party lists, and unsuccessful candidates, were as follows:

Labour	Michael Cullen; Margaret Wilson; Dover Samuels; Jim Sutton^{2} Mita Ririnui; Rick Barker; Jill Pettis; Ashraf Choudhary; Shane Jones; Dianne Yates^{2} Ann Hartley^{2} Georgina Beyer^{2} Maryan Street; David Parker; Russell Fairbrother; Dave Hereora; Moana Mackey; Sue Moroney; Darien Fenton
Labour	Unsuccessful: Charles Chauvel^{1}, Lesley Soper^{1}, Louisa Wall^{1}, William Sio^{1}, Brendon Burns, Hamish McCracken, Denise MacKenzie, Max Purnell, Thomas Harpur, Leila Boyle, Dinesh Tailor, Phil Twyford, Jennifer McCutcheon, Chris Yoo, Michael Wood, Linda Hudson, Stuart Nash, Tony Milne, David Talbot, Marilyn Brown, Anjum Rahman, Eamon Daly, Judy Lawley, Michael Mora, Erin Ebborn-Gillespie, Ailian Su, Ghazala Anwar, Paul Gibson, Kelly-Ann Harvey, Camille Nakhid, Ola Kamel, Andrea Bather
National	Don Brash^{2} David Carter; Katherine Rich; Tim Groser; Richard Worth; Clem Simich; Georgina te Heuheu; Pansy Wong; Chris Finlayson; Nicky Wagner; Tau Henare; Chris Auchinvole; Mark Blumsky; Kate Wilkinson; Nathan Guy; Jackie Blue; Paula Bennett
National	Unsuccessful: Katrina Shanks^{1}, Fepulea'i Aiono, Ravi Musuku, Moira Irving, Mita Harris, Michael Leddy, Conway Powell, David Round, Gilbert Stehbens, Kenneth Yee, Paul Goldsmith, Malcolm Plimmer, Nicola Young, Tim Macindoe, Allison Lomax, Weston Kirton, Rosemarie Thomas
New Zealand First	Winston Peters; Peter Brown; Brian Donnelly^{2} Ron Mark; Doug Woolerton; Barbara Stewart; Pita Paraone
New Zealand First	Unsuccessful: Susan Baragwanath, Jim Peters, Dail Jones^{1}, Craig McNair, Edwin Perry, Bill Gudgeon, Brent Catchpole, Joe Williams, John Foote, Fletcher Tabuteau, Alan Heward, Kristin Campbell Smith, Bryan Lundy, David Fowler, Brendan Stewart, Brett Webster, Bob Daw, Murray Strawbridge, Moetu Davis, Toa Greening, David Mackie, Anne Martin, Julian Batchelor, Chis Perry, Lindy Palmer, Brian Roswell, Matua Glen, James Mist, Howard Levarko, Paul Manning, Timothy Manu, Kevin Gardener, Graham Odering
Greens	Jeanette Fitzsimons; Rod Donald^{2} Sue Bradford; Sue Kedgley; Keith Locke; Metiria Turei
Greens	Unsuccessful: Nándor Tánczos^{12}, Mike Ward, Catherine Delahunty, Russel Norman^{1}, Steffan Browning, David Clendon, Lucinda Highfield, Jonathan Carapiet, Roland Sapsford, Mojo Mathers, Mikaere Curtis, Paul Bruce, Jeanette Elley, Muamua Strickson-Pua, Richard Davies, Lois Griffiths, Natalie Cutler-Welsh, Jane Pearce, Lawrence O'Halloran, Richard Green, Claire Bleakley, Irene Bentley, Craig Carson, Nicola Harvey, Moea Armstrong, Steve Bayliss, Laura Beck, Sarah Brown, Terence Creighton, John Davis, Katherine Dewar, James Diack, Ruth Earth, Kathryn Elsen, Graham Evans, Nicholas Fisher, Robert Guyton, Daniel Howard, Philippa Jamieson, Stephen Lee, Alan Liefting, Mary McCammon, John Milnes, Michael Morris, Noel Peterson, Paul Qualtrough, Jacob Rawls, Raewyn Saville, Ian Stephens, Richard Suggate, Peter Thomlinson
Māori	Unsuccessful: Atareta Poananga, Simon Wi Rutene, Glenis Philip-Barbara, Robert Consedine, Pakake Winiata, Te Whiti Love, Angeline Greensill, William Maea, Monte Ohia, Te Orohi Paul, Bronwyn Yates, Charles Joe, Teremoananuiakiwa Tahere, Malcolm Peri, Anthony Ruakere, Ratapu Te Awa, Brett Cowan, Josephine Peita, Anne Fitzsimon, Abraham Hepi, Ngahiwi Tomoana, Tureiti Moxon, Aroha Reriti-Crofts, John Harré, Rangi McLean, Tell Kuka, Bill Puru, Mere Rawiri-Tau, Richard Orzecki, Maraea Ropata, Robert Hosking, Daryl Gregory, Rangi Tawhiao, Andre Meihana, Solomon Matthews, Adell Dick, Georgina Haremate-Crawford, Raewyn Harrison, Cecilia Hotene, Alice Hudson, Reimana Johnson, Rahuia Kapa, David King, Aaron Makutu, Kelvin Martin, Merehora Taurua, Frances Waaka, Henrietta Walker
United Future	Judy Turner; Gordon Copeland
United Future	Unsuccessful: Marc Alexander, Larry Baldock, Murray Smith, Paul Check, Janet Tuck, Bernie Ogilvy, Graeme Reeves, Russell Judd, Hannah Baral, Joy Lietze, Neville Wilson, Richard Barter, Stephen Taylor, Ian McInnes, Ross Tizard, Fiona McKenzie, Andrew Barr, John Walker, Ram Parkash, Ralph Kennard, Jayati Prasad, Vanessa Roberts, Gerald Telford, Robin Loomes, Robyn Jackson, Anthony Gordon, Gregory Graydon, Martyn Seddon, Bernard McClelland, Beth Stone, Robin Westley, Rosemary Drake, Gordon Hinton, Michael Satur, Diane Brown, Steven Dromgool, Andrea Deeth, Mark Peters, Mary Moffat, Dennis Wells, Milton Osborne, Garry Pedersen, William Pickering, Adam Archer, Neil Linscott, Barry Hayes, Janita Stuart, Dianne Wilson, James Rudd, Peter Mountain, Stuart Robertson, John van Buren, Jeffrey Leigh, Matthew Collier
ACT	Heather Roy
ACT	Unsuccessful: Muriel Newman, Stephen Franks, Graham Scott, Ken Shirley, Kenneth Wang, Gerry Eckhoff, Lindsay Mitchell, Bronwyn Jacobsen, Simon Ewing-Jarvie, Jo Giles, Willie Martin, David Olsen, Hamish Stevens, Andrew Jollands, Hardev Singh Brar, Lech Beltowski, Ian Beker, Christopher Brown, Kevin Gill, John Waugh, Dianne Dawson, Kevin Murray, Stephen Langford-Tebby, Gavin Middleton, John Fraser, Frances Denz, Elizabeth Barkla, Nigel Chetty, Scott Clune, Michael Collins, Tetauru Emile, Andrew Falloon, Michael Heine, Kerry O'Connor, David Seymour, Helen Simpson, Philip White, Alan Wilden, Andrew Stone, Barbara Steinijans, John Riddell, Carl Peterson, Andre Peters, Julie Pepper, Thomas McClelland, Alexander Mann, Michelle Lorenz, Nigel Kearney, Nicholas Kearney, Mark Davies, Stephen Cox, Raymond Bassett, Brian Davidson, Rebekah Holdaway, Shirley Marshall, Patrick O'Sullivan, Garry Mallett
Progressive	Unsuccessful: Matt Robson, Grant Gillon, Megan Woods, John Wright, Sione Fonua, Vivienne Shepherd, Ngov Ly, Fatima Ashrafi, Barry Wilson, Fale Leleisiuao, Russell Franklin, Paula Gillon, Philip Clearwater, Trevor Barnard, Raghbir Singh, Brenda Hill, Fiona Beazley, Russell Caldwell, David Reeks, John Maurice, Seyed Kazemi Yazdi, Heka Heker, Veronique Stewart-Ward, Zemin Zhang, Julian Aaron, Sukerna Amirapu, Annette Anderson, Sukhdev Bains, Peter Banks, James Boyack, Ian Donald, Lewis Holland, Karandeep Lall, Jacqueline McAlpine, Claire Main, Philippa Main, James Palmer, Max Panirau, David Parkyn, Elizabeth Patchett, Talatala Po'e, Pavitra Roy, Elspeth Sandys, Anthony Sharrock, Barry Silcock, Karen Silcock, David Somerset, Petronella Townsend, Martin Vaughan, Jennifer Wilson
Destiny	Unsuccessful: Richard Lewis, David Jesze, Elaine Herbert, Hayden Solomon, Nigel Heslop, Etuate Saafi, Anita Breach, Charles Te Kowhai, David Knight, Hawea Vercoe, Neils Jensen, Sophie Hemahema-Tamati, Rodney Gabb, James Te Wano, Stephen Sinnott, Frances Williamson, Kerin Roberts, Peter Johnston, John Kotoisuva, Karen Penney, Colin Ranby, Tala Leiasamaivao, Paul Hubble, Roberta Maxwell, Tony Harrison, David Daglish, Jason Thomson, Maru Samuel, Stephen Brown, William Sadler, Patrick Morton, Ned So'e, David Isaachsen, Mason Lee, Stanley Green, Patrick Komene, Anthony Ford, Maureen Vincent, Albert Wipani, Brian Ane, Tauha Te Kani, Douglas Keven
Legalise Cannabis	Unsuccessful: Michael Appleby, Michael Britnell, Judy Daniels, Paula Lambert, Irinka Britnell, Kevin O'Connell, Paul McMullan, Steven Wilkinson, Judy Matangi, Jason Baker-Sherman, Peter Green, Neville Yates, Phillip Pophristoff
Christian Heritage	Unsuccessful: Ewen McQueen, Derek Blight, Nicholas Barber, Betty Jenkins, Mark Jones, Joy Jones
Alliance	Unsuccessful: Jill Ovens, Paul Piesse, Andrew McKenzie, Julie Fairey, Kane O'Connell, Leonard Richards, Jim Flynn, Victor Billot, Margaret Jeune, Robert van Ruyssevelt, Thomas Dowie, Christopher Ford, Quentin Findlay, Kelly Buchanan, Joseph Hendren, Gail Marmont, Alexander Protheroe, Gregory Kleis, Sandra Ethell, Colin Pounder, Robert Harrison, Peta Knibb, Marvin Hubbard, Shirley Haslemore, Norman MacRitchie, Eric Gamble, Lynda Boyd, Jocelyn Brooks, Nicholas Corlett, Nicolas Scullin
Family Rights Protection	Unsuccessful: Tafe Williams, Tapu Po-Wihongi, Christine Reid, Lale Ene-Ulugia, John Ulberg, Anne Kerisome Zekaria Strickland, Siniva Papali'i, Amelia Fepulea'i, Tangata Greig, Te Paeru Browne-Knowles, Papali'i Malietoa, Edward Ulberg, Etevise Fuiava, Souvenir Sanerivi, Manogitulua Livapulu-Head, Kearlene Ulberg, Christie Greig, Rafaele Vaifale
Democrats for Social Credit	Unsuccessful: Stephnie de Ruyter, John Pemberton, David Wilson, Richard Prosser, John Steemson, Katherine Ransom, John Kilbride, Graham Atkin, Heather Smith, David Tranter, Edgar Goodhue, Malcolm Murchie, Ross Weddell, David Espin, Ross Hayward, Bruce Stirling, Karl Hewlett, Ronald England, Kelly Pemberton, Robert Warren, David Wood, Mary Weddell, Allen Cookson, Barry Pulford, Hessel van Wieren, Alida Steemson, Edward Fox, Coralie Leyland, John Rawson
Libertarianz	Unsuccessful: Bernard Darnton, Julian Pistorius, Timothy Wikiriwhi, Susan Ryder, Peter Cresswell, Colin Cross, Helen Hughes, Russell Watkins, Peter Linton, Michael Webber, Robin Thomsen, Philip Howison, Michael Murphy, Faustina White, Andrew Bates, Richard Goode, Luke Howison, Christopher Robertson, Peter Osborne, Barry Cole, Donald Rowberry, Willem Verhoeven, Elliot Smith, Nikolas Haden, Terence Verhoeven, Keith Patterson, Kenneth Riddle, Robert Palmer
Direct Democracy	Unsuccessful: Kelvyn Alp, Paul Teio, Dilip Rupa, Patrick Fahy, Michael Francis-Roberson, Simon Guy, Gary Burch, Kevin Smith, Kevin Moore, Kyle Chapman, Rex Newey, Gregory Trichon, Alona Covich, Eugene Opai, Seira Perese, Tin Yau Chan, Helen Koster, Craig Stratton, Alastair Anderson, Anton Foljambe, Robert T Atack, Leanne Martinovich, Grant Burch, Howard Ponga, Edward Sullivan, Colin Punter, Mel Whaanga, Jason Anderson, Jason Orme, Barry Scott, Scott Burch, Craig Guy
99MP	Unsuccessful: Margaret Robertson, Ramasmy Ramanathan
One NZ	Unsuccessful: Ian Brougham, Richard Fisher, James White, John Porter, Janet Walters, Lanya Murray
Republic of NZ	Unsuccessful: Kerry James, Wayne Hawkins, Debra Potroz, Jack Gielen, Steven Hart, Gilbert Parker

Notes

1. These party list members later entered parliament in the term as other list MPs elected resigned from parliament.
2. These party list members later resigned during the parliamentary term.

== Changes during parliamentary term ==
Party	New MP	Term started	Seat	Previous MP
Green	Nándor Tánczos	6 November 2005	List	Rod Donald^{1}
Labour	Charles Chauvel	1 August 2006	List	Jim Sutton
National	Katrina Shanks	7 February 2007	List	Don Brash
Labour	Lesley Soper	15 February 2007	List	Georgina Beyer
NZ First	Dail Jones	15 February 2008	List	Brian Donnelly^{2}
Labour	Louisa Wall	4 March 2008	List	Ann Hartley
Labour	William Sio	29 March 2008	List	Dianne Yates
Green	Russel Norman	26 June 2008	List	Nándor Tánczos
National	(vacant)	31 August 2008	Rakaia	Brian Connell^{3}
^{1} Rod Donald died before being sworn in as MP.^{2} Brian Donnelly was appointed as New Zealand's High Commissioner to the Cook Islands.^{3} Brian Connell retired from Parliament effective 31 August 2008, leaving his seat of Rakaia vacant.
Taito Phillip Field, Labour MP for Māngere, quit the Labour party after being threatened with expulsion on 16 February 2007. He continued to serve as an MP, and formed the New Zealand Pacific Party in January 2008. Gordon Copeland, a United Future list MP, left the party to become an independent MP in May 2007, and contested the 2008 election as a candidate for The Kiwi Party.

== Analysis of results ==
Going into the election, Labour had assurances of support from the Greens (six seats in 2005, down three from 2002) and from the Progressives (one seat, down one). This three-party bloc won 57 seats, leaving Clark four seats short of the 61 seats needed for a majority in the 121-seat Parliament (decreased from the expected 122 because the final results gave the Māori Party only one overhang seat, after it appeared to win two overhang seats on election night). On 5 October the Māori Party began a series of hui to decide whom to support. That same day reports emerged that a meeting between Helen Clark and Māori co-leader Tariana Turia on 3 October had already ruled out a formal coalition between Labour and the Māori Party. Māori Party representatives also held discussions with National representatives, but most New Zealanders thought the Māori Party more likely to give confidence-supply support to a Labour-dominated government because its supporters apparently heavily backed Labour in the party vote.

Had Turia and her co-leader Pita Sharples opted to join a Labour-Progressive-Green coalition, Clark would have had sufficient support to govern with support from a grouping of four parties (Labour, Green, Māori and Progressive). Without the Māori Party, Labour needed the support of New Zealand First (seven seats, down six) and United Future (three seats, down five) to form a government. New Zealand First said it would support (or at least abstain from opposing in confidence-motions) the party with the most seats. Clark sought from New Zealand First a positive commitment rather than abstention. United Future, which had supported the previous Labour-Progressive minority government in confidence and supply, said it would talk first to the party with the most seats about support or coalition. Both New Zealand First and United Future said they would not support a Labour-led coalition which included Greens in Cabinet posts. However, United Future indicated it could support a government where the Greens gave supply-and-confidence votes.

Brash had only one possible scenario to become Prime Minister: a centre-right coalition with United Future and ACT (two seats, down seven). Given the election results, however, such a coalition would have required the confidence-and-supply votes of both New Zealand First and the Māori Party. This appeared highly unlikely on several counts. New Zealand First's involvement in such a coalition would have run counter to Peters' promise to deal with the biggest party, and Turia and Sharples would have had difficulty in justifying supporting National after their supporters' overwhelming support for Labour in the party vote. Turia and Sharples probably remembered the severe mauling New Zealand First suffered in the 1999 election. (Many of its supporters in 1996 believed they had voted to get rid of National, only to have Peters go into coalition with National; New Zealand First has never really recovered.) Even without this to consider, National had indicated it would abolish the Maori seats if it won power.

The new government as eventually formed consisted of Labour and Progressive in coalition, while New Zealand First and United Future entered agreements of support on confidence and supply motions. In an unprecedented move, Peters and Dunne became Foreign Affairs Minister and Revenue Minister, respectively, but remained outside cabinet and had no obligatory cabinet collective responsibility on votes outside their respective portfolios.

Possible government setups

== Background ==
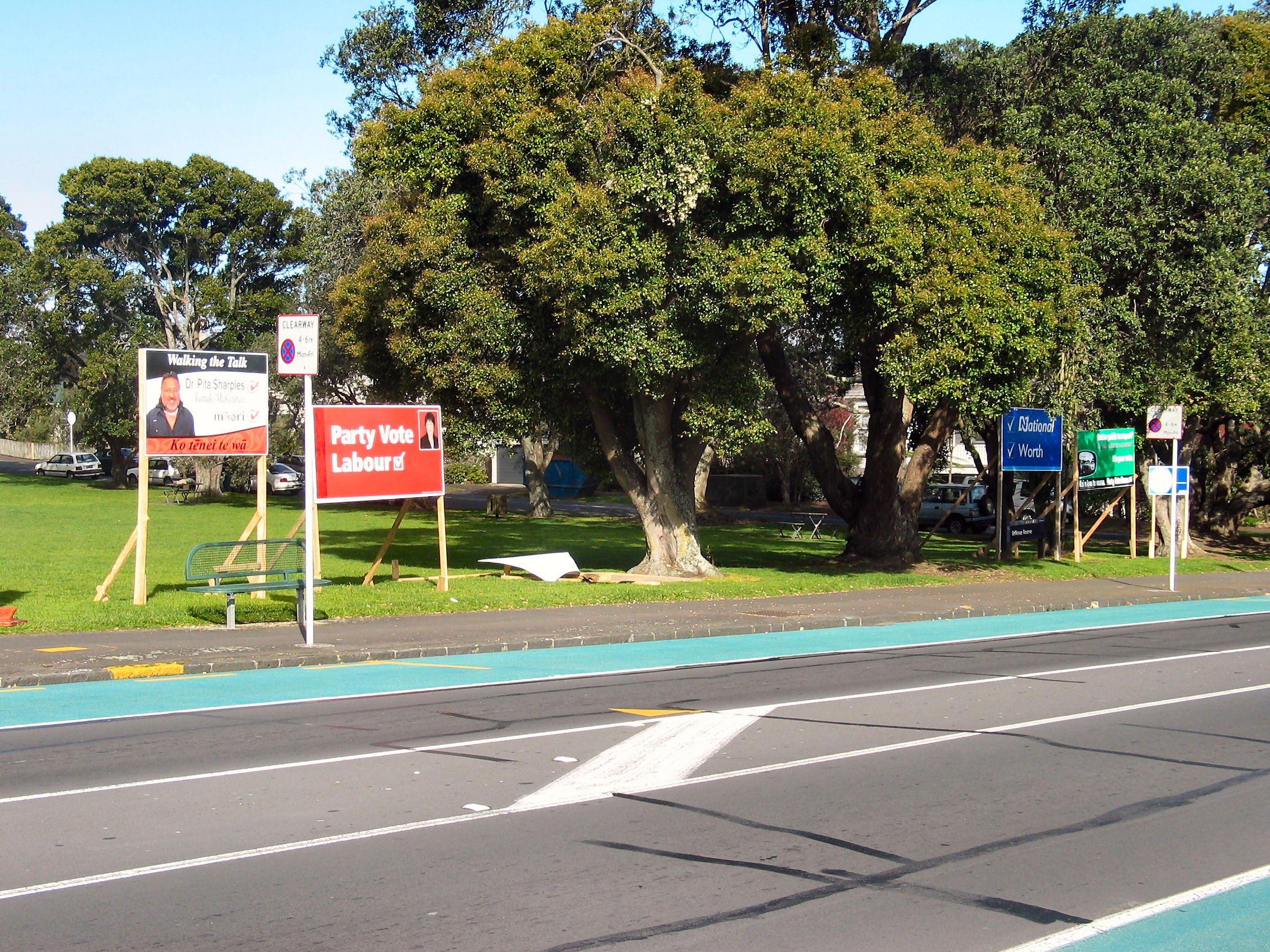
Election billboards advertise the parties and candidates standing nationwide and in each electorate

The governing Labour Party retained office at 2002 election. However, its junior coalition partner, the Alliance, lost most of its support after internal conflict and disagreement and failed to win parliamentary representation. Labour formed a coalition with the new Progressive Coalition, formed by former Alliance leader Jim Anderton. The Labour-Progressive coalition then obtained an agreement of support ("confidence and supply") from United Future, enabling it to form a stable minority government. The National Party, Labour's main opponents, suffered a major defeat, winning only 21% of the vote (22.5% of the seats), its weakest showing in an election.

The collapse of National's vote led ultimately to the replacement of its Parliamentary party leader Bill English with parliamentary newcomer Don Brash, the former governor of the Reserve Bank of New Zealand, on 28 October 2003. Brash began an aggressive campaign against the Labour-dominated government. A major boost to this campaign came with his "Orewa speech" (27 January 2004), in which he attacked the Labour-dominated government for giving "special treatment" to the Māori population, particularly over the foreshore and seabed controversy. This resulted in a surge of support for the National Party, although most polls indicated that this subsequently subsided. National also announced it would not stand candidates in the Māori electorates, with some smaller parties following suit.

The foreshore-and-seabed controversy also resulted in the establishment of the Māori Party in July 2004. The Māori Party hoped to break Labour's traditional (and then current) dominance in the Māori electorates, just as New Zealand First had done in the 1996 election.

A large number of so-called "minor" parties also contested the election. These included Destiny New Zealand (the political branch of the Destiny Church) and the Direct Democracy Party.

== Polls ==
Local regression of poll results from 27 July 2002 to 17 September 2005, with each line corresponding to a political party. Labour National NZ First ACT Green United Future Māori

A series of opinion polls published in June 2005 indicated that the National Party had moved ahead of Labour for the first time since June 2004. Commentators speculated that a prominent billboard campaign may have contributed to this. Some said the National Party had peaked too early. The polls released throughout July showed once more an upward trend for Labour, with Labour polling about 6% above National. The release by the National Party of a series of tax-reform proposals in August 2005 appeared to correlate with an increase in its ratings in the polls.

Direct comparisons between the following polls have no statistical validity:

poll	date	Labour	National	NZ First	Greens
One News Colmar Brunton	29 August	43%	40%	5%	7%
3 News TNS	1 September	39%	41%	6%	6%
Herald DigiPoll	2 September	43.4%	39.1%	6.6%	5%
Fairfax NZ/ACNeilsen	3 September	41%	44%	<5%	5%
One News Colmar Brunton	4 September	38%	46%	4.6%	6%
3 News TNS	7 September	45%	36%	5%	7%
Herald Digipoll	8 September	40.6%	40.1%	7.1%	5.6%
Herald Digipoll	11 September	42.1%	38.5%	5%	6%
ACNielsen-Sunday Star-Times	11 September	37%	44%	5%	6%
One News Colmar Brunton	11 September	39%	41%	6%	6%
Fairfax ACNielsen	14 September	37%	43%	7%	6%
3 News TNS	15 September	40.5%	38.7%	6.8%	6.9%
TVNZ Colmar Brunton	15 September	38%	41%	5.5%	5.1%
Herald Digipoll	16 September	44.6%	37.4%	4.5%	4.6%

No single political event can explain the significant differences between most of these polls over the period between them. They show either volatility in the electorate and/or flaws in the methods of polling. In the later polls, the issue of National's knowledge of a series of pamphlets (distributed by members of the Plymouth Brethren Christian Church and attacking the Green and Labour parties) appeared not to have reduced National Party support.

== Candidates ==
For lists of candidates in the 2005 election see:

- Candidates grouped by electorate
- Candidates grouped by party list

== Major policy platforms ==
=== Labour Party ===
The Labour Party platform included:

- student loans: writing off interest if the recipient stays in New Zealand
- health: a pledge of extra public-hospital operations
- Treaty of Waitangi: accepting no lodgements for Treaty-claims after 1 September 2008
- increasing rates-rebates
- a "KiwiSaver" programme, aimed at getting first homeowners into their own homes
- sponsoring 5,000 new apprenticeships
- increasing community police-force numbers by 250.
- a "Working for Families" tax-relief/benefit programme aimed at lower to middle-income families

=== National Party ===
The National Party campaigned on the platform of (National Party Press Release):

- taxation: lowering income-tax rates. The party ran a television advertisement parodying the telethons aired by TVNZ in the 1980s, rewording the telethon theme song "Thank you very much for your kind donation" (itself a cover of the 1967 The Scaffolds song "Thank U Very Much") to "Thank you very much for your high taxation"
- removing references to the Treaty of Waitangi from existing legislation; and resolving all treaty claims amicably by 2010
- by 1 April 2006, make student-loan repayments and $5000 of pre-school childcare costs recoupable to mainstream New Zealanders
- "reworking" the New Zealand Resource Management Act 1991 to make development easier
- "removing excessive bureaucracy" in the education system, in particular by overhauling the NCEA, and by re-introducing "bulk funding" of schools
- abolishing early parole for violent criminals. (As of 2005 most prisoners became eligible for parole after serving one-third of their sentence)
- a return to "market rents" for state-housing tenants, including a system of paying housing-subsidies (for the poorest tenants) directly to private landlords
- increase Nationwide Maths and English standards
- welfare Reform – reduce the waste of having 300,000 working age New Zealand adults on benefits and to ensure all of those on benefits really need the help
- a "work-for-the-dole" scheme
- abolishing the Maori electorates

== Voting ==
Postal voting for New Zealanders abroad began on 31 August. Ballot voting took place on Saturday 17 September, from 9 am to 7 pm. The Chief Electoral Office released a provisional result at 12:05 am on 18 September.

== Party funding ==
New Zealand operates on a system whereby the Electoral Commission allocates funding for advertising on television and on radio. Parties must use their own money for all other forms of advertising, but may not use any of their own money for television or radio advertising.

Party	Funding in 2005 Election
Labour	$1,100,000
National	$900,000
ACT	$200,000
Greens	$200,000
NZ First	$200,000
United Future	$200,000
Māori Party	$125,000
Progressives	$75,000
Alliance	$20,000
Christian Heritage NZ	$20,000
Destiny NZ	$20,000
Libertarianz	$20,000
99 MP Party*	$10,000
Beneficiaries Party*	$10,000
Democrats	$10,000
National Front*	$10,000
New Zealand F.R.P.P.*	$10,000
Patriot Party*	$10,000
The Republic of New Zealand Party	$10,000

*Must register for funding
Source: Electoral Commission

== Controversies ==
Police investigated six political parties for alleged breaches of election-spending rules relating to the 2005 election, but brought no prosecutions, determining that "there was insufficient evidence to indicate that an offence under s214b of the Electoral Act had been committed."

The Auditor-General has also investigated publicly funded party advertising for the 2005 election, with a leaked preliminary finding of much of the spending as unlawful. Observers expected the release of a final report in October 2006.

=== Plymouth Brethren Christian Church involvement ===
The election was marked by controversial third-party campaigning by members of the Plymouth Brethren Christian Church (at the time known as the Exclusive Brethren). Members of the church funded a campaign aimed at helping the National Party win that included anonymous pamphlets and the hiring of private investigators.

Brethren members funded and distributed pamphlets attacking the incumbent Labour government and, in particular, the Green Party. The pamphlets claimed that the Greens' policies were "reminiscent...of communists". The campaign, which was later revealed to have a "war-chest" of $1.2 million, was organised by a group of seven Brethren businessmen who later identified themselves as the "secret seven".

After the election, in September 2006, it was revealed that Brethren members had hired private investigators to "dig dirt" on Labour MPs. This included surveillance of Prime Minister Helen Clark and her husband, Peter Davis, which coincided with what Clark called a "smear campaign" of rumours about Davis.

National Party leader Don Brash initially distanced himself from the pamphlets. However, he later admitted to meeting with Brethren members, who told him they planned to issue pamphlets attacking the government, to which Brash replied, "that's tremendous". In the wake of the scandal, Brash cut ties with the church.
