= Opinion polling for the 2002 New Zealand general election =

Opinion polling was commissioned throughout the duration of the 46th New Zealand Parliament in the lead up to the 2002 election by various organisations.

== Party vote ==
Polls are listed in the table below in chronological order. Refusals are generally excluded from the party vote percentages, while question wording and the treatment of "don't know" responses and those not intending to vote may vary between survey firms.

=== Graphical summary ===
Local regression of polls conducted
Local regression of polls conducted, zoomed into smaller parties

=== Individual polls ===
Poll	Date (Note: These are the survey dates of the poll, or if the survey dates are not stated, the date the poll was released.)	Labour	National	Alliance	ACT	Green	NZ First	United Future	Prog
1999 election result	27 Nov 1999	38.74	30.50	7.74	7.04	5.16	4.26	N/A (Note: United Future was founded in 2000 and Jim Anderton's Progressive Party was founded in 2002, thus neither party contested the 1999 general election.)	
TV3/CM Research poll	28 Feb 2000	51	30	5	4	4	3	–	–
One News Colmar Brunton	28 Feb 2000	50	31	4.3	5	4.3	2.1	–	–
TV3/CM Research poll	18 Apr 2000	53	28	3	4	5	1	–	–
TV3/CM Research poll	26 Jun 2000	46	34	4	4	5	2	–	–
Herald-DigiPoll	30 Jun 2000	43	32	8	10	3	6	–	–
June 2000 – Dover Samuels resigns from Cabinet pending an investigation into alleged sex crimes committed before he entered politics.
TV3/CM Research poll	22 Aug 2000	47	36	3	4	5	2	–	–
NBR-Compaq	7–10 Sep 2000	36	41	6	4	7	–	–	–
TV3/CM Research poll	31 Oct 2000	44	39	5	3	4	2	–	–
TV3/CM Research poll	20 Feb 2001	49	34	4.5	3.6	4.7	1.5	–	–
TV3-NFO	9 Apr 2001	50	32	3.7	4.2	5	2	0.5	–
NBR-Compaq	5 May 2001	43	32	5	6	6.5	–	–	–
One News Colmar Brunton	14 May 2001	44	41	2	–	6	–	–	–
TV3-NFO	11 Jun 2001	49	31	3.5	2	7	3.3	–	–
8 October 2001 – Bill English is elected leader of the National Party.
One News Colmar Brunton	9–12 Oct 2001	46	39	2	3.1	5	3.5	–	–
NBR-Compaq	19 Oct 2001	43	33	3.8	5.2	8	3.6	–	–
One News Colmar Brunton	12 Nov 2001	44	40	4	3	5	2	–	–
TV3/CM Research poll	17 Dec 2001	45	35	3	3	6	3	–	–
TV3/CM Research poll	27 Feb 2002	54	30	2.2	3	6	2.2	–	–
April 2002 – Jim Anderton leaves the Alliance and Laila Harré replaces him as leader.
NBR HP-Invent	7 Jun 2002	53	29	0.5	4.5	7.2	3.3	–	1.3
TV3-NFO	10 Jun 2002	56	24	1.2	3.9	9	3.1	<0.5	<0.5
Herald-DigiPoll	10 Jun 2002	49.9	31.2	0.1	4.7	7.7	2.5	0.1	0.7
One News Colmar Brunton	17 Jun 2002	53	27	0.5	4	9	3	–	2
Herald-DigiPoll	26 Jun 2002	52.1	25.7	0.5	4.4	8.3	3.8	–	2
Herald-DigiPoll	3 Jul 2002	51.2	24.6	0.4	5.7	9.6	4.4	0.1	1.4
TV3-NFO	5 Jul 2002	51	24	1.1	5	10.8	5.7	–	1.1
Herald-DigiPoll	11 Jul 2002	48	24.5	0.4	5.8	10.1	6.4	0.7	1.5
TV3-NFO	11 Jul 2002	48	24	1.2	6.3	7.9	7.9	0.9	0.8
One News Colmar Brunton	15 Jul 2002	46	27	1	8	9	6	–	1
Herald-DigiPoll	17 Jul 2002	46.7	23.1	0.4	5.5	11.3	8.3	1.1	1.3
TV3-NFO	18 Jul 2002	46	25	1.4	6	9	8	0.7	0.7
Herald-DigiPoll	22 Jul 2002	40.8	23.6	0.4	8.1	6.9	10.2	6.6	1.3
One News Colmar Brunton	25 Jul 2002	44	21	1	7	8	10	4	0.5
TV3-NFO	25 Jul 2002	43	21	1.4	8	9	8	3.9	1.2
Herald-DigiPoll	26 Jul 2002	38.8	23.2	1.3	8.9	9	9.6	5.4	1.4
2002 election result	27 Jul 2002	41.26	20.93	1.27	7.14	7.00	10.38	6.69	1.70

== Preferred prime minister ==
=== Individual polls ===
Poll	Date	Helen Clark	Jenny Shipley	Winston Peters	Jim Anderton
TV3/CM Research poll	28 Feb 2000	36	13	-	-
One News Colmar Brunton	28 Feb 2000	43	16	-	-
TV3/CM Research poll	18 Apr 2000	42	13	-	-
TV3/CM Research poll	22 Aug 2000	31	16	-	-
TV3/CM Research poll	18 Apr 2000	28	14	-	-
TV3/CM Research poll	20 Feb 2001	35	16	-	-
TV3/CM Research poll	20 Feb 2001	30	13	-	-
TV3-NFO	9 Apr 2001	36	11	–	–
One News Colmar Brunton	14 May 2001	37	17	–	3
Poll	Date	Helen Clark	Bill English	Winston Peters	Jim Anderton
One News Colmar Brunton	9–12 Oct 2001	41	21	–	–
One News Colmar Brunton	12 Nov 2001	40	19	–	–
TV3/CM Research poll	17 Dec 2001	41	17	-	-
TV3/CM Research poll	27 Feb 2002	41	10	5	3
One News Colmar Brunton	17 Jun 2002	52	17	4	2
One News Colmar Brunton	15 Jul 2002	48	19	7	2

== Electorate polling ==
=== Candidate vote ===
Poll	Date	Marian Hobbs	Hekia Parata	Robert Reid
Dominion Post BRC	2-4 Jul 2002	32	15	1

=== Candidate vote ===
Poll	Date	Jim Anderton	Mike Mora	Alec Neill	Sean Gourley
UMR Research	22 Jul 2002	40.6	26.4	19	2

=== Candidate vote ===
Poll	Date	Lynne Pillay	Laila Harré	Marie Hasler
Consumer Link	24 Jul 2002	33	25	24

=== Candidate vote ===
Poll	Date	Sandra Goudie	Max Purnell	Jeanette Fitzsimons
Consumer Link	24 Jul 2002	33	27	24

=== Candidate vote ===
Poll	Date	Dover Samuels	Mere Mangu
Marae DigiPoll	6–17 Jul 2002	44	9

== See also ==
- Opinion polling for the 2005 New Zealand general election
- Politics of New Zealand
