= Opinion polling for the 2005 New Zealand general election =

Opinion polling was commissioned throughout the duration of the 47th New Zealand Parliament and in the lead up to the 2005 election by various organisations.

== Party vote and key events in the leadup to the 2005 election ==
Refusals are generally excluded from the party vote percentages, while question wording and the treatment of "don't know" responses and those not intending to vote may vary between survey firms.

=== Graphical summary ===
Local regression of polls conducted

=== Individual polls ===
Poll	Date	Labour	National	NZ First	ACT	Green	United Future	Māori	Destiny
2002 election result	27 Jul 2002	41.26	20.93	10.38	7.14	7.00	6.69	N/A (Note: The Māori Party and Destiny New Zealand were formed in 2004 and 2003, so did not contest the 2002 election)	
One News Colmar Brunton	1 Sep 2002	40	25	10	6	7	8		
TV3 NFO	16 – 22 Sep 2002	49	19	10	5	8	4.7		
NBR-HP Invent	19 – 22 Sep 2002	44	22	9.5		8.5	5.9		
One News Colmar Brunton	23 – 26 Sep 2002	47	26	8	5	6	4		
One News Colmar Brunton	27 Oct 2002	51	25	7	5	5	5		
NBR-HP Invent	18 – 20 Oct 2002	47	24	9.1	4.9	7.5	4.7		
TV3 NFO	18 – 24 Nov 2002	50	19	10	4.8	8	5		
One News Colmar Brunton	18 Nov 2002	49	26	8	6	5	2.9		
One News Colmar Brunton	15 Dec 2002	52	25	6	5	5	4		
Herald-DigiPoll	3 Feb 2003	49.6	22.9	7.2	5.9	5.1	3.3		
TV3 NFO	10 – 16 Feb 2003	56	21	6	4.2	6	3.6		
One News Colmar Brunton	17 Feb 2003	53	27	5	6	6	2		
One News Colmar Brunton	23 Mar 2003	51	28	6	6	5	2.9		
TV3 NFO	7 – 13 Apr 2003	53	26	5	4.9	6	2.4		
One News Colmar Brunton	13 Apr 2003	52	26	6	5	5	2		
Herald-DigiPoll	15–18 May 2003	49.4	28	8	5.6	5.3	1.8		
One News Colmar Brunton	12 – 15 May 2003	50	28	7	6	3	2		
TV3 NFO	9 – 16 Jun 2003	52	24	8	4.5	6	2.9		
One News Colmar Brunton	16 Jun 2003	54	28			4			
13 Jun 2003 – Destiny New Zealand is formed.
Herald-DigiPoll	Jul 2003	48.2	27.2	9.2	4.8	5.1	3.4		
One News Colmar Brunton	13 Jul 2003	51	28	7	6	4	1.1		
Herald-DigiPoll	12 – 17 Aug 2003	47.7	26.8	9.7	4.4	5	4.2		
TV3 NFO	12 Aug 2003	52	23	9	5	6	2.7		
One News Colmar Brunton	17 Aug 2003	47	27	8	6	5	2.6		
One News Colmar Brunton	15 Sep 2003	45	29	8	5	7	3.4		
Herald-DigiPoll	15 Oct 2003	43.3	22.3	12.3	6.2	9.2	2.7		
TV3 NFO	6 Oct 2003	46	24	10	6	8	2.9		
One News Colmar Brunton	14 Oct 2003	45	27	8	6	7	2.8		
28 Oct 2003 – Don Brash is elected leader of the National Party.
One News Colmar Brunton	9 Nov 2003	45	31	8	4	7	2.2		
One News Colmar Brunton	14 Dec 2003	45	28	11	6	4	2.1		
27 Jan 2004 – Don Brash delivers his Orewa Speech.
Herald-DigiPoll	23 Feb 2004	37	45.5	5.6	2.3	5.3	1.4		
3 News TNS	5 Feb 2004	43	32	8	4.2	8	2.4		
One News Colmar Brunton	29 Jan – 4 Feb 2004	38	45	6	1.3	5	1.8		
3 News TNS	27 – 29 Feb 2004	39	42	6	2.4	6	0.9		
One News Colmar Brunton	22 Mar 2004	39	49	4	2	2.2	1.7		
3 News TNS	25 – 31 Mar 2004	42	42	5	1.3	4.6	2.1		
One News Colmar Brunton	25 Apr 2004	37	48	5	1.6	5	1.9		
One News Colmar Brunton	17 – 20 May 2004	37	47	5	3	4	1.4		
Herald-DigiPoll	27 May – 1 Jun 2004	36	44	5.6	2	4.7	2.4		
3 News TNS	27 May – 3 Jun 2004	43	40	5	2	4.6	2.3		
13 Jun 2004 – Rodney Hide replaces Richard Prebble as leader of ACT New Zealand.
One News Colmar Brunton	21 Jun 2004	40	44	2.7	2.3	5	2.2		
One News Colmar Brunton	5 – 8 Jul 2004	39	43	5	2.7	4	2.2		
7 Jul 2004 – The Māori Party is formed.
3 News TNS	31 Jul 2004	44	39	5	2.6	4.7	1.8	0.9	
Sunday Star-Times/BRC	1 Aug 2004	44	39		3			3	
One News Colmar Brunton	9 – 12 Aug 2004	44	40	4	1.6	4	1.5		
One News Colmar Brunton	13 Sep 2004	42	42	5	2.5	4	1.7		
Herald-DigiPoll	28 Sep 2004	40.8	36	5	1	3.6	2.6	1.5	
3 News TNS	30 Sep – 6 Oct 2004	45	33	5	3.3	5.2	2.8		
One News Colmar Brunton	14 Oct 2004	44	39	5	3.1	4	2.2		
One News Colmar Brunton	15 Nov 2004	44	38	5	3.3	4	2.5		
Herald-DigiPoll	19 – 27 Nov 2004	50.1	30.4	5.7	2.5	5.4	2.3	1.9	
3 News TNS	25 Nov – 1 Dec 2004	46	32	7	2.8	5.1	2.3	2.6	
One News Colmar Brunton	13 Dec 2004	47	35	5	2.8	5	1.4		
Herald-DigiPoll	1 Feb 2005	44.8	35.3	4.7	1.6	6.9	3	1.5	
3 News TNS	4 Feb 2005	46	38	5	2.1	4.7	1.4	1.7	
One News Colmar Brunton	14 Feb 2005	44	39	5	2	4	1	2	
One News Colmar Brunton	14 – 17 Mar 2005	46	35	5	3	5	1	1	
Herald-DigiPoll	22 – 30 Mar 2005	47.7	34.5						
3 News TNS	15 Apr 2005	45	34	8					
One News Colmar Brunton	17 Apr 2005	45	38	7	3	4	1	1	
One News Colmar Brunton	16 May 2005	44	37	8	2	4	1	2	
3 News TNS	9 – 16 Jun 2005	40	36	11	1.5	6			
Fairfax Media–Nielsen	18 Jun 2005	40	38	8	2	5	2	2	
One News Colmar Brunton	19 Jun 2005	41	43	7	2	3	1	2	
One News Colmar Brunton	18 Jul 2005	39	42	7	1	6	1	2	
3 News TNS	21 – 27 Jul 2005	39	39	7	1.6	6	1.4	2.2	
Roy Morgan Research	21 Jul – 1 Aug 2005	38	38	10	1.5	6	2		
One News Colmar Brunton	1–4 Aug 2005	45	41	5	2	3	1	1	
Roy Morgan Research	2–15 Aug 2005	40	36.5	8	2.5	7.5	2		
One News Colmar Brunton	15–18 Aug 2005	45	37	6	2	6	1	1	1
One News Colmar Brunton	22–25 Aug 2005	43	40	5	2	7	1	1	1
3 News TNS	25 – 30 Aug 2005	39	41	6	1.4	6	1.7	1.7	
One News Colmar Brunton	29 Aug – 1 Sep 2005	38	46	5	1	6	1	2	1
Roy Morgan Research	3 – 13 Sep 2005	38.5	37	6.5	3	7.5	2.5	1.5	
One News Colmar Brunton	5–8 Sep 2005	39	41	6	3	6	2	1	1
3 News TNS	8 – 14 Sep 2005	40.5	38.7	6.8	0.9	6.9	3.0	1.4	
Herald-DigiPoll	9 – 14 Sep 2005	44.6	37.4	4.5	1.3	4.6	2.6	2.3	
One News Colmar Brunton	12 – 14 Sep 2005	38	44	6	1.9	5	2.5	1.7	
Fairfax Media–Nielsen	13 Sep 2005	37	43	7	1	6	3	1	
2005 election result	17 Sep 2005	41.1	39.1	5.7	1.5	5.3	2.7	2.1	0.6
Poll	Date	Labour	National	NZ First	ACT	Green	United Future	Māori	Destiny

== See also ==
- 2005 New Zealand general election
- Politics of New Zealand
