= Camille Nakhid =

Professor in New Zealand

Camille Nakhid MNZM
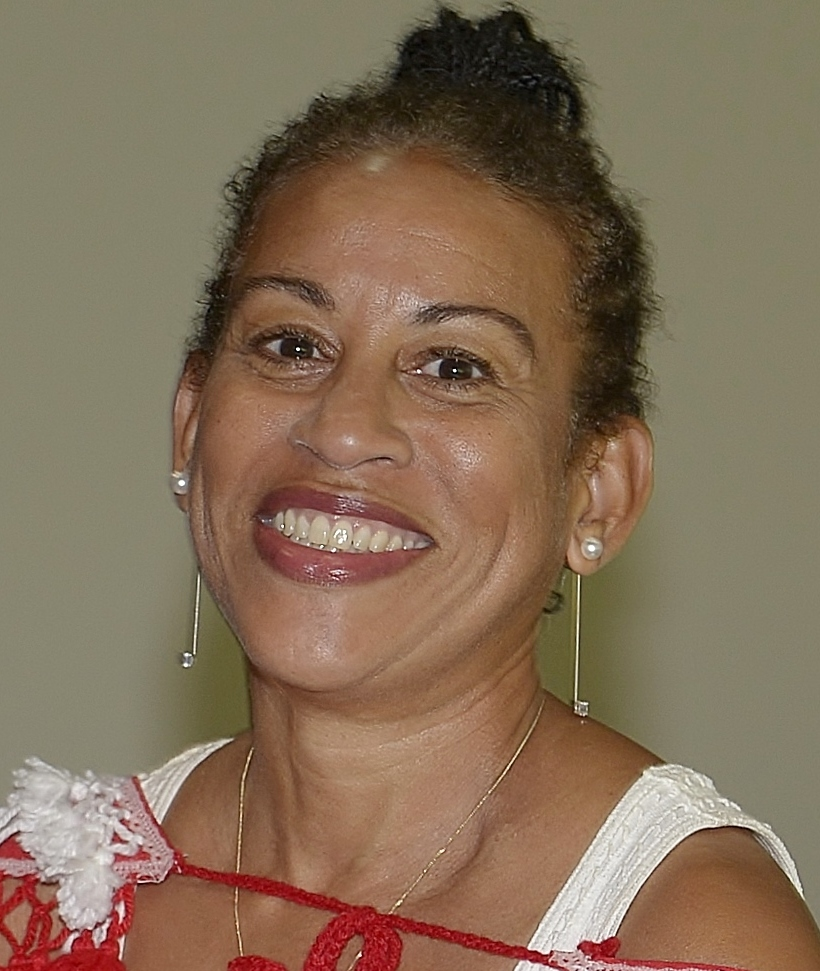
- Nakhid in 2018
- Born: Trinidad and Tobago
- Occupation: academic
- Known for: social science and public policy research
- Awards: Member of the New Zealand Order of Merit

Academic background
- Education: New York University; Auckland University of Technology
- Doctoral advisor: Roger Dale

Camille Elizabeth Anne Nakhid MNZM is a professor of social science and public policy at Auckland University of Technology. In 2018 she was appointed a Member of the New Zealand Order of Merit for services to ethnic communities and education.

== Academic career ==
Nakhid has a Bachelor of Science from New York University. She also holds a diploma and a master's degree in education, and a postgraduate certificate in emergency management. She has lived in New Zealand for more than 20 years, In 2018 Nakhid complete a doctorate at the University of Auckland, with a thesis titled "Intercultural" perceptions and institutional responses: explaining Pasifika students' achievement in New Zealand secondary schools. She was promoted to full professor at the Auckland University of Technology.

Nakhid researches migrant resettlement, queer and ethnic communities, and academic achievement in Māori and Pasifika people, as well as how to make research methodologies culturally relevant. Her research has shown that New Zealanders are more polite about their racism than people elsewhere, which can make it more difficult to call it out as racism.

Nakhid advises Auckland Council on ethnic issues through the Ethnic People's Advisory Panel, of which she was the inaugural chair. She has served on the Henderson Community Board, the Waitakere Ethnic Board, and the Pacific Media Centre Advisory Board.

== Awards and honours ==
In 2018 Nakhid was appointed a Member of the New Zealand Order of Merit for services to ethnic communities and education.

== Personal life ==
Nakhid was born in Trinidad and Tobago. She has a Samoan husband, and plays in a steel band with her son.

== Selected works ==
- Nakhid, Camille; Shorter, Lily Tairiri (2013). "Narratives of four Māori ex-inmates about their experiences and perspectives of rehabilitation programmes". International Journal of Offender Therapy and Comparative Criminology. 58 (6): 697–717. doi:10.1177/0306624x13476939. PMID 23486752. Wikidata Q45099564.
- Nakhid, Camille (2011). "Equity for Māori and Pasifika Students: The Objectives and Characteristics of Equity Committees in a New Zealand University". Equity and Excellence in Education. 44 (4): 532–550. doi:10.1080/10665684.2011.613703. Wikidata Q100872219.
- Nakhid, Camille; Vano, Lourdes; Tuwe, Makanaka; Ali, Zina (2023). "Love, sex, and other dangers – intimate partner relationships of young ethnic queers in Aotearoa New Zealand". Sexualities. doi:10.1177/13634607231159850. Wikidata Q121871996.
- Nakhid-Chatoor, Margaret; Nakhid, Camille; Wilson, Shakeisha; Anabel Fernandez Santana (2018). "Exploring liming and ole talk as a culturally relevant methodology for researching with Caribbean people". International Journal of Qualitative Methods. 17 (1): 1609406918813772. ISSN 1609-4069. Wikidata Q121859090.
- Adesayo Adelowo; Smythe, Elizabeth; Nakhid, Camille (2016), Deciding to migrate: Stories of African immigrant women living in New Zealand, vol. 28, pp. 52–59, Wikidata Q121859087
- Nakhid, Camille; Fa’alogo, J. P.; Faiva, M.; Halafihi, D.; Pilisi, S.; Senio, J.; Thomas, L. (2007), Aua’ii le galuega: A Pasifika research design ensuring ownership and autonomy, vol. 32, pp. 106–125, Wikidata Q121859084
- Nakhid, Camille (2009), The meaning of family and home for young Pasifika people involved in gangs in the suburbs of South Auckland, vol. 35, pp. 112–128, Wikidata Q121859081
- Nakhid, Camille (2006). "Ethics and the obstruction of social justice for Maori and Pasifika (Pacific Islands) students in tertiary institutions in Aotearoa (New Zealand)". Race Ethnicity and Education. 9 (3): 295–305. doi:10.1080/13613320600807683. Wikidata Q121859078.
