= International Journal of Offender Therapy and Comparative Criminology =

- Discipline: Criminology
- Language: English
- Edited by: Mark T. Palermo

Publication details
- History: 1972-present
- Publisher: SAGE Publications
- Frequency: 16/year
- Impact factor: 1.87 (2018)

Standard abbreviations
- ISO 4: Int. J. Offender Ther. Comp. Criminol.

Indexing
- ISSN: 0306-624X (print); 1552-6933 (web)
- LCCN: sn87016097
- OCLC no.: 1250617

Links
- Journal homepage; Online access; Online archive

The International Journal of Offender Therapy and Comparative Criminology is a peer-reviewed academic journal that publishes papers in the field of criminology. The journal's editor-in-chief is Mark T. Palermo ([The Law Art and Behavior Foundation] and Medical College of Wisconsin). It was established in 1966 and is currently published by SAGE Publications.

== Abstracting and indexing ==
International Journal of Offender Therapy and Comparative Criminology is abstracted and indexed in Scopus and the Social Sciences Citation Index. According to the Journal Citation Reports, its 2017 impact factor is 1.452, ranking it 48 out of 82 journals in the category "Psychology, Applied" and 33 out of 61 in "Criminology & Penology", and 25 out of 57 journals in the category "Criminology & Penology".
