= 2002 New Zealand general election =

General election in New Zealand

- 27 July 2002

All 120 seats in the House of Representatives 61 seats needed for a majority
- Opinion polls
- Registered: 2,670,030
- Turnout: 2,055,404; 76.98% (▼7.79%)
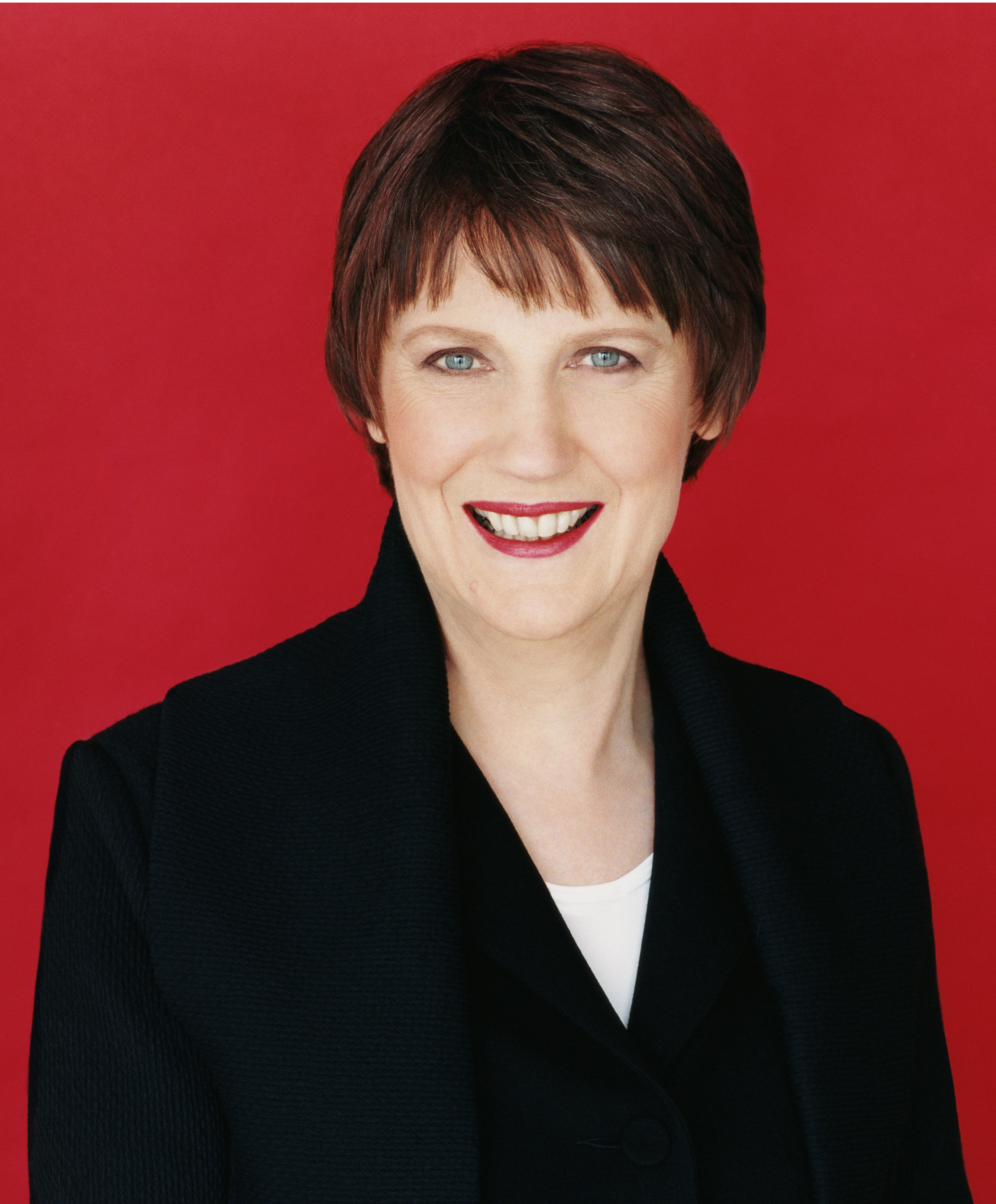

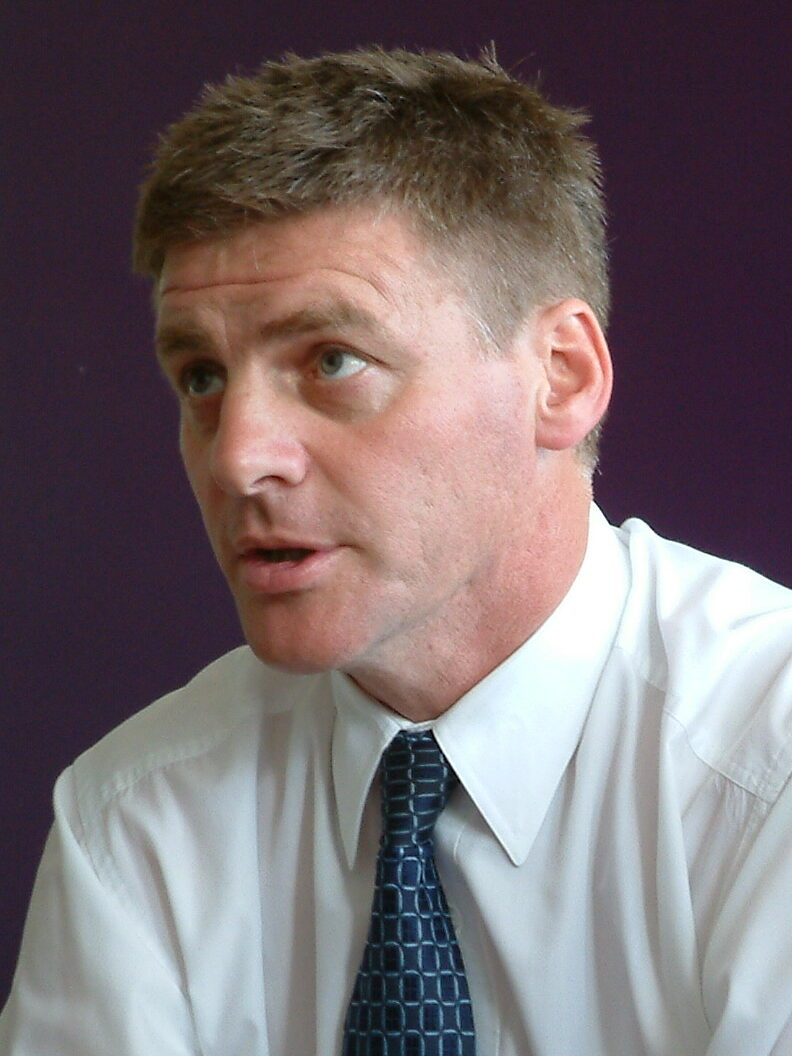

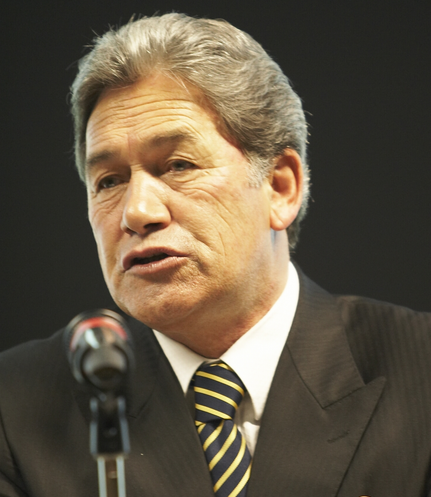

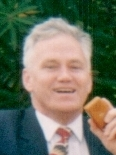

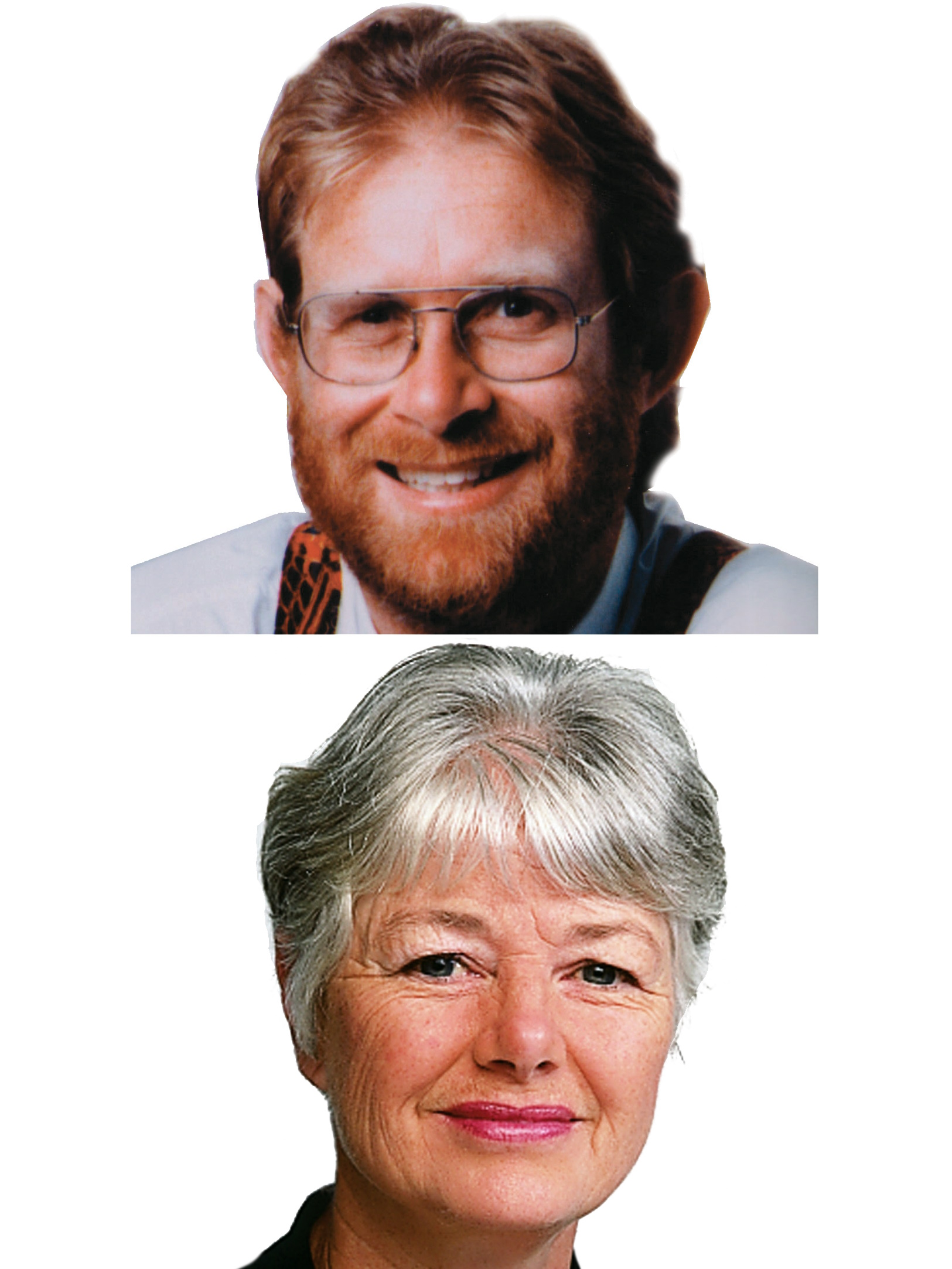

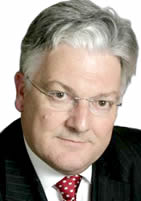

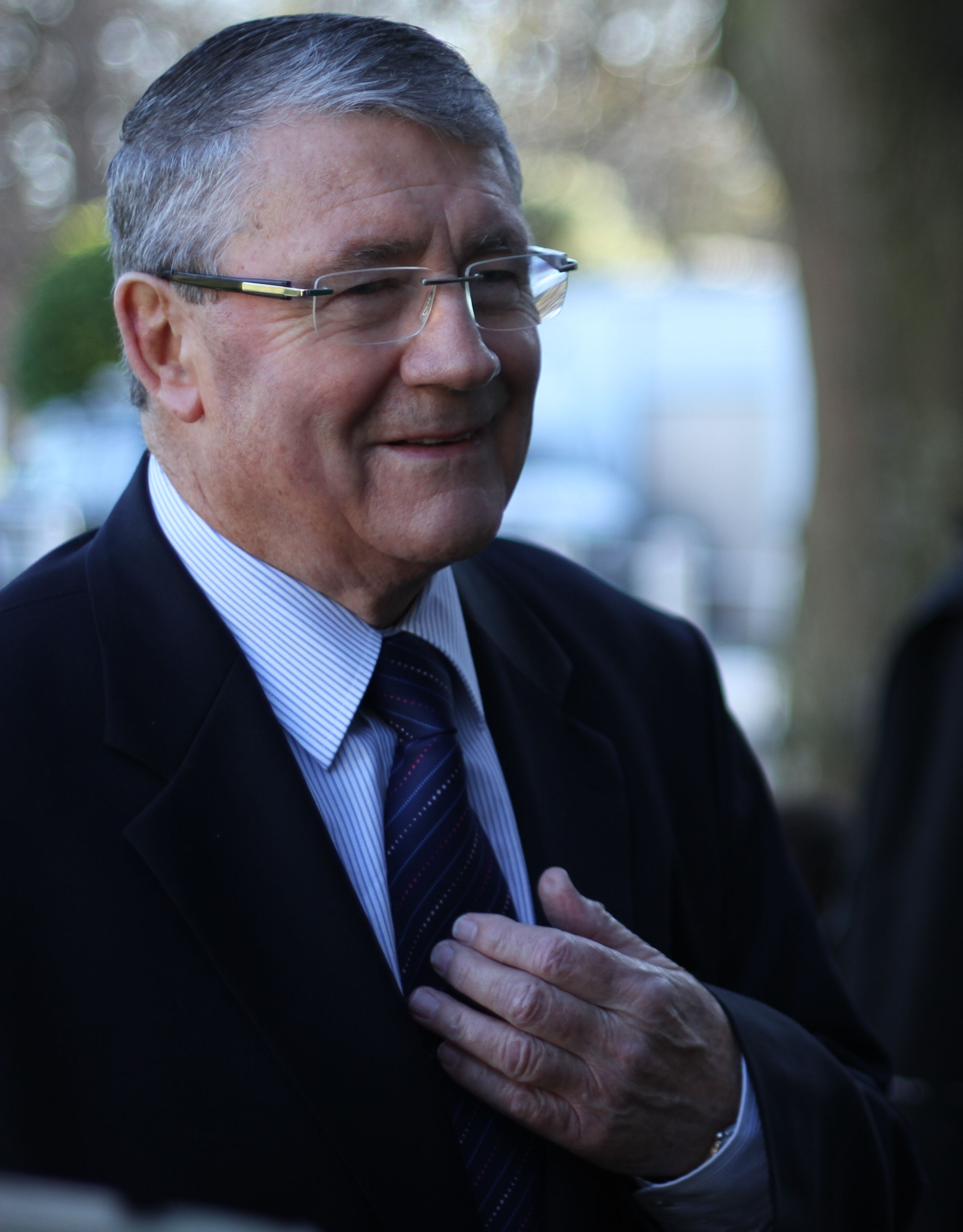

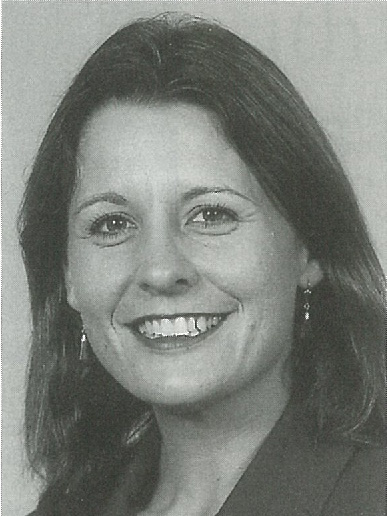
	First party	Second party	Third party
Leader	Helen Clark	Bill English	Winston Peters
Party	Labour	National	NZ First
Leader since	1 December 1993	8 October 2001	18 July 1993
Leader's seat	Mount Albert	Clutha-Southland	Tauranga
Last election	49 seats, 38.74%	39 seats, 30.50%	5 seats, 4.26%
Seats won	52	27	13
Seat change	▲3	▼12	▲8
Party vote	838,219	425,310	210,912
Percentage	41.26%	20.93%	10.38%
Swing	▲2.52 pp	▼9.57 pp	▲6.12 pp
	Fourth party	Fifth party	Sixth party
Leader	Richard Prebble	Rod Donald; Jeanette Fitzsimons	Peter Dunne
Party	ACT	Green	United Future New Zealand
Leader since	26 March 1996	21 May 1995	16 November 2000
Leader's seat	List	List; List (lost Coromandel)	Ohariu-Belmont
Last election	9 seats, 7.04%	7 seats, 5.16%	1 seat, 1.65%^{a}
Seats won	9	9	8
Seat change	0	▲2	▲7
Party vote	145,078	142,250	135,918
Percentage	7.14%	7.00%	6.69%
Swing	▲0.10 pp	▲1.84 pp	▲5.04 pp
	Seventh party	Eighth party
Leader	Jim Anderton	Laila Harré
Party	Progressive	Alliance
Leader since	27 July 2002	20 April 2002
Leader's seat	Wigram	List (lost seat)
Last election	Not yet founded	10 seats, 7.74%
Seats won	2	0
Seat change	▲2	▼10
Party vote	34,542	25,888
Percentage	1.70%	1.27%
Swing	new	▼6.47 pp
- Results by electorate, shaded by winning margin
Prime Minister and coalition before election
Helen Clark (Labour)
Labour—Alliance (C&S: Green)
Subsequent Prime Minister and coalition
Helen Clark (Labour)
Labour—Progressive (C&S: United Future)

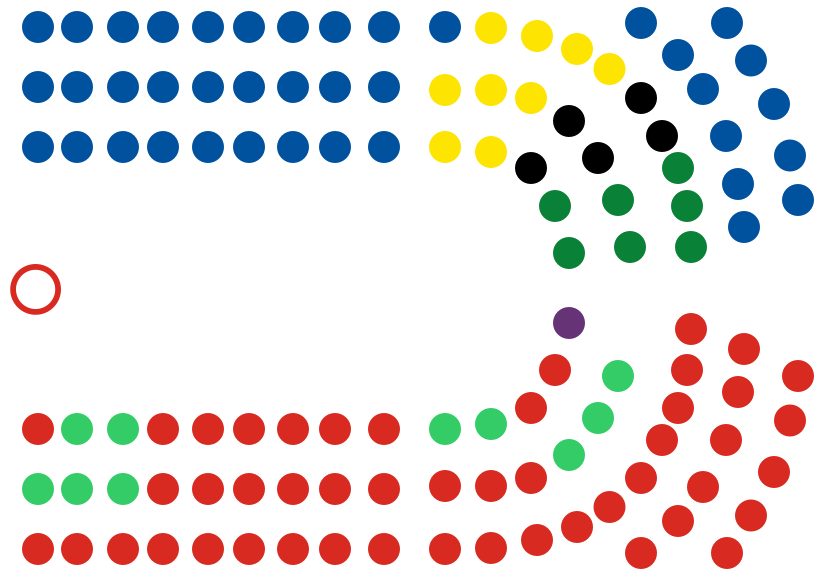
Parliamentary makeup prior to the 2002 election. Government: Labour (49) Alliance (10) Green (7) Opposition: National (39) ACT (8) NZ First (5) United NZ (1)

The 2002 New Zealand general election was held on 27 July 2002 to determine the membership of the 47th New Zealand Parliament. It saw the reelection of Helen Clark's Labour Party government, as well as the worst-ever performance by the opposition National Party (the 2020 election would see it suffer a greater defeat in terms of net loss of seats).

A controversial issue in the election campaign was the end of a moratorium on genetic engineering, strongly opposed by the Green Party. Some commentators have claimed that the tension between Labour and the Greens on this issue was a more notable part of the campaign than any tension between Labour and its traditional right-wing opponents. The release of Nicky Hager's book Seeds of Distrust prior to the election also sparked much debate. The book examined how the government handled the contamination of a shipment of imported corn with genetically modified seeds. Clark called the Greens "goths and anarcho-feminists" during the campaign.

== Background ==
On 12 June the government announced that the country would have a general election on 27 July. This was several months earlier than was required, a fact which caused considerable comment. The Prime Minister, Helen Clark, claimed that an early poll was necessary due to the collapse of her junior coalition partner, the Alliance. Critics, however, claimed that Clark could have continued to govern, and that the early election was called to take advantage of Labour's strong position in the polls. Some commentators believe that a mixture of these factors was responsible.

Before the election, the Labour Party held 49 seats in parliament. It governed in coalition with the smaller (and more left-wing) Alliance, which had 10 seats. It also relied on support from the Greens, but this was a largely informal arrangement, and the Greens were not a part of the administration itself. Opposing Labour were the National Party (centre-right), United Future (centrist), New Zealand First (populist), ACT New Zealand (free-market). Many opinion polls for the election indicated that Labour was popular enough to conceivably win an absolute majority, leaving it able to govern without the support of smaller parties. Labour's dominance over National was such that for many people, the question was not whether Labour would win, but whether Labour would receive the absolute majority it sought.

=== MPs retiring in 2002 ===
Eleven MPs, including two Alliance MPs, six National MPs, and two Labour MPs intended to retire at the end of the 46th Parliament.

Party	Name	Electorate
Alliance	Phillida Bunkle	(List)
Alliance	Kevin Campbell	(List)
Alliance	Sandra Lee-Vercoe	(List)
National	Warren Kyd	Hunua
National	Max Bradford	(List)
National	Jenny Shipley	Rakaia
National	Doug Kidd	(List)
National	Wyatt Creech	(List)
National	John Luxton	(List)
Labour	Geoff Braybrooke	Napier
Labour	Joe Hawke	(List)
Labour	Judy Keall	Otaki

== Outgoing parliament ==
Affiliation	Ideology	Members	
Affiliation	Ideology	At 1999 election	At dissolution
Labour	Social democracy	49	49
Alliance	Democratic socialism	10	4
Progressive	Social democracy	did not exist	6
Green	Green politics	7	7
National	Conservatism	39	39
ACT	Classical liberalism	9	9
NZ First	Populism	5	5
United NZ	Christian democracy	1	1
Total		120	120

== The election ==
There were 2,670,030 registered voters, the highest number for any election in New Zealand. However, only 77% of these registered voters chose to cast a vote, a considerable drop from previous elections. Many commentators cited Labour's dominance in the polls as a reason for this low turnout. Many people saw the outcome as inevitable, and so did not bother to vote at all.

In the election 683 candidates stood, and there were 14 registered parties with party lists. Of the candidates, 433 were electorate and list, 160 were electorate only, and 90 were list only. 71% of candidates (487) were male and 29% (196) female.

== Results ==
As most people expected, Labour was victorious. It did not, however, receive an absolute majority, gaining only 52 seats (eight seats short of the half-way mark). Labour's former coalition partner, the Alliance (which had splintered shortly before the election), was not returned to parliament. However, the new Progressive Coalition (now the Progressive Party) started by former Alliance leader Jim Anderton won two seats, and remained allied with Labour. The Greens, who were now distanced from Labour over the genetic engineering controversy, gained nine seats (an increase of two).

In general, it was a bad election for the parties of the right. The National Party, once referred to as "the natural party of government", suffered its worst-ever electoral defeat, gaining only 21% of the vote. ACT New Zealand, National's more right-wing neighbour, failed to capitalise on the exodus of National supporters, retaining the same number of seats as before. Instead, the most notable gains among opposition parties were made by two centrist parties. One of these was Winston Peters's New Zealand First, a populist and nationalist party opposed to immigration. Strong campaigning by Peters allowed the party to recover from its serious losses in the 1999 election. The other was United Future New Zealand party, a centrist party based on a merger of the United Party and the Future New Zealand party – primarily due to the performance of leader Peter Dunne, the party shot from having one seat to having eight seats.

Once the final distribution of seats was determined, it was clear that Labour would be at the centre of the government, and that it would be allied with the Progressives. However, this still left Labour needing support in matters of confidence and supply, as the two parties together fell short of an absolute majority. Labour expressed a preference for an "agreement" rather than a full coalition, hoping to establish an arrangement similar to the one that existed with the Greens prior to the election. Three realistic choices existed for a partner – the Greens, United Future, and New Zealand First. Labour had repeatedly ruled out deals with New Zealand First during the election campaign, and reaffirmed this soon after the election, leaving just the Greens and United Future as candidates. After a period of negotiation, Labour opted to ally with United Future, being unwilling to change their genetic engineering policies to secure the Green Party's support.

Labour and the Progressives remained in power, with support in confidence and supply votes from United Future.

== United Future surge ==
Dunne was asked to appear on the TVNZ Leaders' Debate on 15 July 2002, less than two weeks out from the election at a time when United Future were barely scratching 1% in the polls. In post-debate interviews, Dunne remarked that the debate had given United Future "a huge boost", giving him a national platform that he had not previously enjoyed. This debate was regarded as the tipping point that rejuvenated his United Future Party, delivering seven extra MPs on election night for a total of eight in the house, a record-breaking result for the party.

== Detailed results ==
=== Parliamentary parties ===
Summary of the 27 July 2002 election for the House of Representatives
Party	Party vote			Electorate vote			Seats			
Party	Votes	%	Change (pp)	Votes	%	Change (pp)	List	Electorate	Total	+/-
Labour	838,219	41.26	▲2.52	891,866	44.69	▲2.94	7	45	52	▲3
National	425,310	20.93	▼9.57	609,458	30.54	▼1.38	6	21	27	▼12
NZ First	210,912	10.38	▲6.12	79,380	3.98	▼0.21	12	1	13	▲8
ACT	145,078	7.14	▲0.10	70,888	3.55	▼0.97	9	0	9	Steady
Green	142,250	7.00	▲1.84	106,717	5.35	▲1.14	9	0	9	▲2
United Future	135,918	6.69	▲5.04^{a}	92,484	4.63	▲2.59^{a}	7	1	8	▲7
Progressive	34,542	1.70	new	36,647	1.84	new	1	1	2	new
Christian Heritage	27,492	1.35	▼1.03	40,810	2.05	▼0.14	0	0	0	Steady
ORNZ	25,985	1.28	new	—	—	—	0	0	0	new
Alliance	25,888	1.27	▼6.47	33,655	1.69	▼5.21	0	0	0	▼10
Legalise Cannabis	12,987	0.64	▼0.46	3,397	0.17	▼0.17	0	0	0	Steady
Mana Māori	4,980	0.25	Steady	8,130	0.41	▲0.22		0	0	Steady
One NZ	1,782	0.09	▲0.03	2,617	0.13	▲0.12	0	0	0	Steady
NMP	274	0.01	▼0.04	—	—	▼0.03		0	0	Steady
Libertarianz	—	—	▼0.29	672	0.03	▲0.03	0	0	0	Steady
Unregistered parties	—	—	—	3,821	0.19	▲0.08	0	0	0	Steady
Independent	—	—	—	14,927	0.75	▼0.37	0	0	0	Steady
Valid votes	2,031,617	98.84	▲1.74	1,995,586	97.09	▲0.84				
Informal vote	8,631	0.42	▼0.51	26,529	1.29	▼0.49				
Disallowed votes	15,156	0.74	▼1.23	33,289	1.62	▼0.35				
Total	2,055,404	100		2,055,404	100		51	69	120	
Eligible voters and Turnout	2,670,030	76.98	▼7.79	2,670,030	76.98	▼7.79				

=== Votes summary ===
Constituency Vote
Labour	44.69%
National	30.54%
Green	5.35%
United Future	4.63%
NZ First	3.98%
ACT	3.55%
Christian Heritage	2.05%
Progressive	1.84%
Alliance	1.69%
Others	1.68%

Party Vote
Labour	41.26%
National	20.93%
NZ First	10.38%
ACT	7.14%
Green	7.00%
United Future	6.69%
Progressive	1.70%
Christian Heritage	1.35%
ORNZ	1.28%
Alliance	1.27%
Others	1.00%

Parliament seats
Labour	43.33%
National	22.50%
NZ First	10.83%
ACT	7.50%
Green	7.50%
United Future	6.67%
Progressive	1.67%

=== Electorate results ===
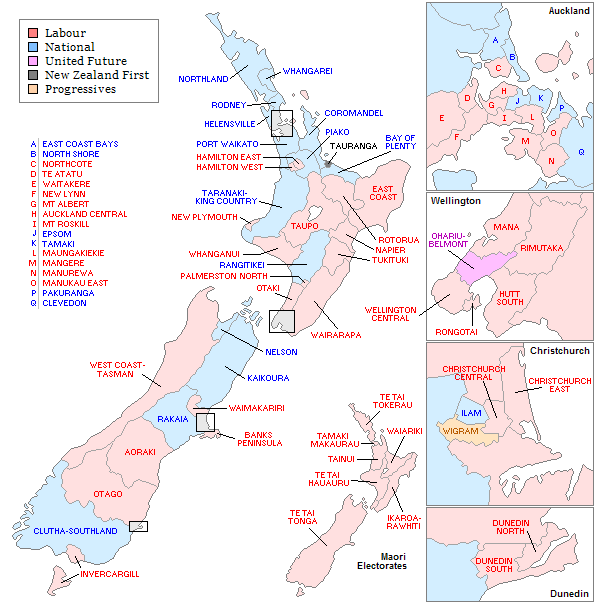
Party affiliation of winning electorate candidates.

Of the 69 electorates in the 2002 election, a majority (45) were won by the Labour Party. The opposition National Party won 21 electorate seats. Labour dominated the urban areas, where it has traditionally been strongest, while National performed best in rural areas. However, Labour's strong position in this election led to National losing ground in a number of its traditional strongholds. The loss of Otago electorate, a rural area, was one notable example.

Labour also dominated in the seven Maori seats. National gained second place in only one Maori electorate, with Labour's main rivals being the Mana Maori Movement, the Greens, and the Alliance.

Of the minor parties, only three managed to win electorates, mostly due to the strong personal following of the incumbents. United Future leader Peter Dunne retained his strong support in the Wellington electorate of Ohariu-Belmont, while New Zealand First leader Winston Peters retained Tauranga. Progressive leader Jim Anderton retained the Christchurch seat of Wigram, which he had formerly held as leader of the Alliance.

The table below shows the results of the 2002 general election:

Key:

Labour	National	NZ First	Green	United Future
Alliance	Progressive	Mana Māori	Independent

Electorate results for the 2002 New Zealand general election
Electorate	Incumbent	Winner	Majority	Runner up
Aoraki	Jim Sutton		6,453	Wayne Marriott
Auckland Central	Judith Tizard		5,205	Pansy Wong
Banks Peninsula	Ruth Dyson		4,057	David Carter
Bay of Plenty	Tony Ryall		5,597	Peter Brown
Christchurch Central	Tim Barnett		10,353	Nicky Wagner
Christchurch East	Lianne Dalziel		14,864	Stephen Johnston
Clevedon	New electorate	Judith Collins	3,127	Dave Hereora
Clutha-Southland	Bill English		6,808	Lesley Soper
Coromandel	Jeanette Fitzsimons	Sandra Goudie	5,958	Max Purnell
Dunedin North	Pete Hodgson		10,637	Katherine Rich
Dunedin South	David Benson-Pope		14,724	Paul Foster-Bell
East Coast	Janet Mackey		5,343	Leanne Jensen-Daines
East Coast Bays	New electorate	Murray McCully	1,534	Hamish McCracken
Epsom	Richard Worth		5,619	Di Nash
Hamilton East	Tony Steel	Dianne Yates	614	Tony Steel
Hamilton West	Martin Gallagher		5,574	Bob Simcock
Helensville	New electorate	John Key	1,705	Gary Russell
Hutt South	Trevor Mallard		7,771	Richard Townley
Ilam	Gerry Brownlee		3,872	Richard Pole
Invercargill	Mark Peck		2,792	Eric Roy
Kaikoura	Lynda Scott		3,069	Brendon Burns
Mana	Graham Kelly	Winnie Laban	6,376	Sue Wood
Mangere	Taito Phillip Field		15,375	Sylvia Taylor
Manukau East	Ross Robertson		10,657	Arthur Anae
Manurewa	George Hawkins		12,548	Enosa Auva'a
Maungakiekie	Mark Gosche		6,603	Belinda Vernon
Mount Albert	Helen Clark		16,024	Raewyn Bhana
Mount Roskill	Phil Goff		13,715	Brent Trewheela
Napier	Geoff Braybrooke	Russell Fairbrother	4,157	Anne Tolley
Nelson	Nick Smith		4,232	John Kennedy
New Lynn	New electorate	David Cunliffe	11,185	Brendan Beach
New Plymouth	Harry Duynhoven		14,930	Geoff Horton
North Shore	Wayne Mapp		5,098	Helen Duncan
Northcote	Ann Hartley		2,624	Jeremy Sole
Northland	John Carter		7,558	Rachel Rose
Ohariu-Belmont	Peter Dunne		12,534	Gil Boddy-Greer
Otago	Gavan Herlihy	David Parker	684	Gavan Herlihy
Otaki	Judy Keall	Darren Hughes	7,736	Roger Sowry
Pakuranga	Maurice Williamson		4,556	Michael Wood
Palmerston North	Steve Maharey		7,627	Dave Scott
Piako	New electorate	Lindsay Tisch	1,621	Sue Moroney
Port Waikato	Paul Hutchison		5,972	Lesley Harry
Rakaia	Jenny Shipley	Brian Connell	6,076	Tony Milne
Rangitikei	Simon Power		5,315	Margaret Hayward
Rimutaka	Paul Swain		12,615	Mike Leddy
Rodney	Lockwood Smith		4,566	Grant Duffy
Rongotai	Annette King		11,493	Glenda Hughes
Rotorua	Steve Chadwick		7,744	Malcolm Short
Tamaki	Clem Simich		1,207	Leila Boyle
Taranaki-King Country	Shane Ardern		7,175	Judy Hawkins
Taupo	Mark Burton		7,128	Weston Kirton
Tauranga	Winston Peters		10,362	Margaret Wilson
Te Atatu	Chris Carter		12,932	Tau Henare
Tukituki	Rick Barker		6,419	Craig Foss
Waimakariri	Clayton Cosgrove		10,536	Dan Gordon
Wairarapa	Georgina Beyer		6,372	Ian Buchanan
Waitakere	Brian Neeson	Lynne Pillay	2,333	Laila Harré
Wellington Central	Marian Hobbs		4,181	Hekia Parata
West Coast-Tasman	Damien O'Connor		7,722	Barry Nicolle
Whanganui	Jill Pettis		2,070	Chester Borrows
Whangarei	Phil Heatley		3,214	David Shearer
Wigram	Jim Anderton	Jim Anderton	3,176	Mike Mora
Māori electorates
Electorate	Incumbent	Winner	Majority	Runner-up
Ikaroa-Rāwhiti	Parekura Horomia		10,359	Glenis Philip-Barbara
Tainui	New electorate	Nanaia Mahuta	3,430	Willie Jackson
Tāmaki Makaurau	New electorate	John Tamihere	9,444	Metiria Turei
Te Tai Hauāuru	Nanaia Mahuta	Tariana Turia	8,657	Ken Mair
Te Tai Tokerau	Dover Samuels		5,336	Mere Mangu
Te Tai Tonga	Mahara Okeroa		8,052	Bill Karaitiana
Waiariki	Mita Ririnui		6,717	Rihi Vercoe

=== List results ===
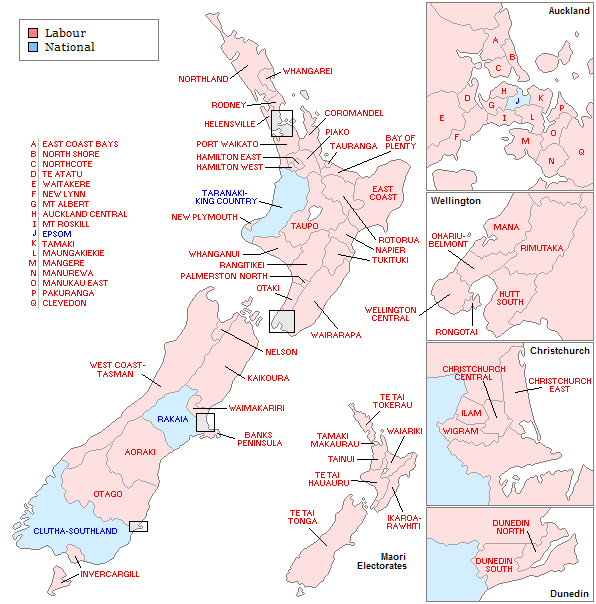
Highest polling party in each electorate.

MPs returned via party lists, and unsuccessful candidates, were as follows:

Labour	Michael Cullen; Jonathan Hunt^{1} Margaret Wilson; Graham Kelly^{1} Helen Duncan; Dave Hereora; Ashraf Choudhary
Labour	Unsuccessful: Moana Mackey^{2}, Lesley Soper^{2}, Carol Beaumont, Max Purnell, David Shearer, Gill Boddy-Greer, Brendon Burns, Louisa Wall, David Maka, Hamish McCracken, Eamon Daly, Lesley Harry, Brenda Lowe-Johnson, Steven Ching, Leila Boyle, John Cheesman, Richard Pole, Paul Gibson, Margaret Hayward, Di Nash, Denise Mackenzie, Judy Hawkins, Dinesh Tailor, Kath Peebles, Mike Mora, Yani Johanson, Nathan Saminathan, Ola Kamel, Jan Noonan, Maureen Waaka, Lyndsay Rackley, Wayne Hawker
National	Roger Sowry; David Carter; Don Brash; Georgina te Heuheu; Pansy Wong; Katherine Rich
National	Unsuccessful: Hekia Parata, Gavan Herlihy, Bob Simcock, Allan Peachey, Sue Wood, Guy Salmon, Alec Neill, Belinda Vernon, Anne Tolley, Eric Roy, Arthur Anae, Ian Buchanan, Greg White, Marie Hasler, Annabel Young, Eric Liu, Tau Henare, Chester Borrows, Nicky Wagner, Leanne Jensen-Daines, Tim Macindoe, Wayne Marriott, Dan Gordon, Jeremy Sole, George Ngatai, Dale Stephens, Craig Foss, Glenda Hughes, Dave Scott, Weston Kirton, Hamuera Mitchell, Enosa Auva'a, Sylvia Taylor, Barry Nicolle, Paul Foster, Mita Harris, Brent Trewheela, Raewyn Bhana, Bill Karaitiana, Geoff Horton, Rodney Williams, Alan Delamere, Peter O'Brien, Rod O'Beirne
New Zealand First	Peter Brown; Brian Donnelly; Ron Mark; Doug Woolerton; Barbara Stewart; Pita Paraone; Craig McNair; Jim Peters; Dail Jones; Edwin Perry; Bill Gudgeon; Brent Catchpole
New Zealand First	Unsuccessful: Rob Harris, Dawn Mullins, Brett Webster, Gordon Stewart, Fletcher Tabuteau, Bob Daw, Dave Mackie, John Riley, John Bryce Geary
ACT	Richard Prebble; Rodney Hide; Muriel Newman; Stephen Franks; Donna Awatere Huata^{2} Deborah Coddington; Ken Shirley; Gerry Eckhoff; Heather Roy
ACT	Unsuccessful: Kenneth Wang^{1}, Paul King, Owen Jennings, Penny Webster, Andrew Davies, Dick Quax, Nigel Mattison, David Edward Olsen, Willie James Martin, Mary Hackshaw, John Thompson, Lech Beltowski, Joanne Reeder, Nicholas Cairney, Bruce Williams, Gerald Trass, Andrew Jollands, Bryce Bevin, Ron Scott, Dianne Mulcock, Shirley Marshall, Juanita Angell, John Peters, Glen Snelgar, Matt Ball, Ray Bassett, Carl Beentjes, Michael Coote, Brian George Dawson, Dianne Dawson, Ted Erskine-Legget, Simon Anthony Ewing-Jarvie, Ted Howard, Elizabeth Hurley, Dorothy King, Chris Newman, Chris O'Brien, Julie Pepper, Peter Phiskie, John Riddell, Robin Roodt, Ian Sage, Greg Sneddon, Graham Douglas Steenson, Ian Swan, Peter Talbot-King, Anthony Watson, John Waugh, Roland Weber, Trevor West, Smilie Wood
Greens	Jeanette Fitzsimons; Rod Donald; Sue Bradford; Nándor Tánczos; Sue Kedgley; Ian Ewen-Street; Keith Locke; Metiria Turei; Mike Ward
Greens	Unsuccessful: Catherine Delahunty, Roland Sapsford, Meriel Anne Watts, Jon Carapiet, Richard Davies, Celia Wade-Brown, Cathy Olsen, Russel Norman, Janine McVeagh, Steffan Browning, Dayle Belcher, Kei Clendon, Craig Potton, David Musgrave, Deborah Martin, Te Ruruanga Te Keeti, Steve Abel, Sarah Millington, Calvin Green, Caro Henckels, Fliss Butcher, Peter Berger, Hana Blackmore, Gareth Bodle, Paul Bruce, Craig Carson, Terry Creighton, Jan Davey, Paul de Spa, Pip Direen, Ian Douglas, Gaye Dyson, Jeanette Elley, Don Fairley, Nick Fisher, Jo Francis, Richard Green, Caroline Greig, Lois Griffiths, Perce Harpham, David Hill, Laurie Hoverd, Stephen Lee, Kate Lowe, Paul Lowe, Rachel Mackintosh, Mary McCammon, Margaret McKenzie, Olivia Mitchell, Matt Morris, Chris Norton-Brown, Fraser Palmer-Hesketh, Di Pennell, David Rose, Christiaan Briggs, Jane Williams
United Future	Gordon Copeland; Bernie Ogilvy; Marc Alexander; Murray Smith; Larry Baldock; Judy Turner; Paul Adams
United Future	Unsuccessful: Kelly Chal*, Wayne Chapman, Andrew Kubala, Gray Eatwell, Bruce McGrail, Hassan Hosseini, Craig Hunt, Kevin Harper, Russell Judd, Anne Drake, Ian McInnes, Graham Butterworth, Andrea Deeth, Cindy Ruakere, Chris Bretton, Susanne Fellner, Jim Howard, Martyn Seddon, Tom Smithers, Ross Tizard, Grant Bowater, Steve Taylor, Graham Turner, Dave Fitness, Paul Duxbury, Richard Carter, Lee Edmonds, Stephen Russell, Sharee Adams, Lee Robertson, Rachel Smithers, Rob Moodie, Witana Murray, Frank Owen, Graeme Torckler, Denis Gilmore, Andrew Smith, Tony Bunting, Graeme Barr, James Te Kahupuku Hippolite, Mike Mitcalfe, Stephanie McEwin, Bruce Settle, Peter Collins, Todd Whitcombe, Joy Lietze, Gray Phillips, Chris Collier, Allan Smellie, Jesse O'Brien, Julee Smith-Mischeski, Vince Smith, Dennis Wells
Progressive	Matt Robson
Progressive	Unsuccessful: Grant Gillon, John Wright, Stephnie de Ruyter, Peter Campbell, Rosie Brown, Meng Ly, Susi Pa'o Williams, Jill Henry, Phil Clearwater, David Angus Wilson, Sue Elizabeth Wharewaka-Topia Watts, Pasene Tauialo-o-Lilimaiava, Nong Li, John Pemberton, Bruce Parr, Vivienne Shepherd, Trevor Lance Barnard, Russell Franklin, Annette Anderson, Adrian James Bayly, Victor Bradley, Lyndsay Brock, Robert Bryan, Christine Cheesman, Fleur Churton, David Culverhouse, Jamie Daly, Clare Dickson, Bob Fox, Russell Edwards, David Espin, Bill Henderson, Steven Charles Ihaia, Frede Jorgensen, Te Pare Joseph, Doreen Henderson, Toni Jowsey, Peter David Kane, C Kerr, John Kilbride, Martin Lawrence, Doug McCallum, Philippa Main, John Neill, Garry Oster, Ram Parkash, Dawn Patchett, Bob Peck, Jim Medland, Rob Shirley, Lynley Simmons, Heather Marion Smith, Arthur Toms, Gillian Dance, Hessel Van Wieren, Ross Weddell, Roger White, Barry Pulford
Christian Heritage	Unsuccessful: Graham Capill, Merepeka Raukawa-Tait, Vic Pollard, Dick Holland, Vic Jarvis, Gerald Barker, Ken Munn, Roger Payne, Ruth Jarvis, Nick Barber, Gavin Denby, Chris Salt, Ian Cummings, Grant Bradfield, McGregor Simpson, Rod Harris, Margaret Burgess, Mike Ferguson, Matthew Flannagan, Madeline Jane Flannagan
Outdoor Recreation	Unsuccessful: Lester Phelps, David O'Neill, Paul Check, Warren Sinclair, Henry Willems, Peter Ellery, Edwin Sylva, James Cook, Peter Gibbons, Michael Holmes, James Rudd, Harry Bimler
Alliance	Unsuccessful: Laila Harré, Willie Jackson, Matt McCarten, Liz Gordon, Tricia Cutforth, Gerard Hehir, Vern Winitana, Rebecca Matthews, Mike Treen, Naida Glavish, Robert Reid, Jill Ovens, Sam Huggard, Janice Panoho-Smith, Vernon Iosefa Tile, Julie Fairey, Gavin MacLean, Carolyn Payne-Harker, Kamaka Manuel, Mary-Ellen O'Connor, Maxine Boag, Moira Lawler, Len Richards, Ravaani Ghaemmaghamy, John Tuwhakairiora Tibble, Anna McMartin, Anna Sutherland, Hayley Rawhiti, Joseph Randall, Sean Gourley, Peter Wheeler, Val McClimont, Margaret Jeune, Dion Martin, Paula Henderson, Brendon Lane, Peter Jamieson, Fiona McLaren, Solly Southwood, Michael Gilchrist, Paul Protheroe, Justin Wilson, Karl Bartleet, Richard Wallis, Simon Shields, Craig Willis, Helen Mackinlay, Robert Van Ruyssevelt
Legalise Cannabis	Unsuccessful: Michael Appleby, Michael Britnell, Irinka Britnell, Dave Moore, Christine Mitchell, Jeanette Saxby, Paul John Michael McMullan, Judy Daniels, Judy Matangi, Paula Lambert, Sugra Morley, Peter Green
Mana Maori	Unsuccessful: Angeline Greensill, Ken Mair, Glenis Philip-Barbara, Tame Iti, Jacqui Amohanga, Rihi Vercoe, Mere Takoko, Tanima Bernard, Colleen Skerrett-White, Piripi Haami, Ngahape Lomax, Sharon Pehi-Barlow
One New Zealand	Unsuccessful: John Porter, Jim White, Alan McCulloch, Janet White, Richard Fisher, David Moat, Walter Christie, Gill Edwards, Peter Grove, John Bull
NMP	Unsuccessful: Mark Atkin, Brett Kenneth Gifkins

*Chal was ranked fifth on the United Future list and was declared elected, serving as an MP for 17 days. However, it emerged that Chal was not actually eligible to stand for election, as she was not a New Zealand citizen. As a result, she was removed from the party list.

Notes

1. These party list members later entered parliament in the term as other list MPs elected resigned from parliament.
2. These party list members later resigned during the parliamentary term.

=== Summary of seat changes ===
- Electoral redistributions:
  - A minor reconfiguration of electorates and their boundaries occurred between the 1999 and 2002 elections. Five seats were abolished and seven were created, giving a net increase of two electorates.
  - The seats of Albany, Hunua, Karapiro, Titirangi and Hauraki (Maori) ceased to exist.
  - The seats of Clevedon, East Coast Bays, Helensville, New Lynn, Piako, Tainui (Maori) and Tamaki Makaurau (Maori) came into being.
- Seats captured:
  - By Labour: Hamilton East, Otago and Waitakere were captured from National.
  - By National: Coromandel was captured from the Greens.
  - The seat of Wigram transferred from the Alliance to the Progressives due to a change of its MP's party affiliation.
- Seats transferred from departing MPs to new MPs:
  - The seat of Rakaia, held by a departing National MP, was won by a new National candidate.
  - The seats of Mana, Napier, Otaki, and Te Tai Hauauru, all held by departing Labour MPs, were won by new Labour candidates (although the departing Mana MP became a list MP and the departing Te Tai Hauauru MP returned to Parliament in another electorate).
- Labour list seats: Lost 1 (was 8, fell to 7)
  - Retired: 1
  - Became electorate MPs: 3
  - Re-elected: 4
  - Newly elected: 3 (including a former electorate MP)
- National list seats: Lost 11 (was 17, fell to 6)
  - Retired: 4
  - Re-elected: 5
  - Not re-elected: 8
  - Newly elected: 1
- New Zealand First list seats: Gained 8 (was 4, rose to 12)
  - Re-elected: 4
  - Newly elected: 8
- ACT list seats: No change (was 9, remained 9)
  - Re-elected: 7
  - Not re-elected: 2
  - Newly elected: 2
- Green list seats: Gained 3 (was 6, rose to 9)
  - Re-elected: 6
  - Newly elected: 3 (including a former electorate MP)
- Alliance list seats: Lost 9 (was 9, fell to 0)
  - Retired: 1
  - Not re-elected: 3
  - (Transferred to Progressives: 5)
- United Future list seats: Gained 7 (was 0, rose to 7)
  - Newly elected: 7
- Progressive list seats: Gained 1 (was 0, rose to 1)
  - (Transferred from Alliance: 5)
  - Retired: 2
  - Re-elected: 1
  - Not re-elected: 2
