= Party lists in the 2005 New Zealand general election =

New Zealand political candidates in the MMP era
Year	Party list	Candidates
1996	party lists	by electorate
1999	party lists	by electorate
2002	party lists	by electorate
2005	party lists	by electorate
2008	party lists	by electorate
2011	party lists	by electorate
2014	party lists	by electorate
2017	party lists	by electorate
2020	party lists	by electorate
2023	party lists	by electorate

This page provides the party lists put forward in New Zealand's 2005 election. Party lists determine (in the light of proportional voting) the appointment of list MPs under the mixed-member proportional (MMP) electoral system. Electoral law required submission of all party lists by 23 August 2005.

== Parliamentary parties ==
The following parties gained representation:

=== ACT New Zealand ===
Rank	Name	Incumbency	Contesting electorate	Previous rank	Change	Initial results	Later changes
1	Rodney Hide	Electorate	Epsom	2	+1	✓ Won Epsom	
2	Heather Roy	List	Ohariu-Belmont	9	+7	✓ Elected from list	
3	Muriel Newman	List	Whangarei	3	0	✗ Lost seat	
4	Stephen Franks	List	Wellington Central	4	0	✗ Lost seat	
5	Graham Scott			—	—		
6	Ken Shirley	List	Tamaki	7	+1	✗ Lost seat	
7	Kenneth Wang	List	Mount Roskill	10	+3	✗ Lost seat	
8	Gerry Eckhoff	List	Otago	8	0	✗ Lost seat	
9	Lindsay Mitchell		Hutt South	—	—		
10	Bronny Jacobsen		Pakuranga	—	—		
11	Simon Ewing-Jarvie		Otaki	41	+30		
12	Jo Giles		Ilam	—	—		
13	Willie Martin		Dunedin North	18	+5		
14	David Olsen		Port Waikato	17	+3		
15	Hamish Stevens		Manukau East	—	—		
16	Andrew Jollands		Taupo	26	+10		
17	Hardev Singh Brar			—	—		
18	Lech Beltowski			21	+3		
19	Ian Beker		Invercargill	—	—		
20	Chris Brown		Rodney	—	—		
21	Kevin Gill		West Coast-Tasman	—	—		
22	John Waugh		Rangitikei	57	+35		
23	Dianne Dawson		Northcote	39	+16		
24	Kevin Murray		Aoraki	—	—		
25	Stephen Langford-Tebby		Helensville	—	—		
26	Gavin Middleton		Rongotai	—	—		
27	John Fraser		Clutha-Southland	—	—		
28	Francis Denz		Tauranga	—	—		
29	Elizabeth Barkla			—	—		
30	Nigel Chetty			—	—		
31	Scott Clune			—	—		
32	Michael Collins		Mana	—	—		
33	Tetauru Emile		Wigram	—	—		
34	Andrew Falloon			—	—		
35	Mike Heine		Nelson	—	—		
36	Kerry O'Connor		New Plymouth	—	—		
37	David Seymour		Mount Albert	—	—		
38	Helen Simpson		Auckland Central	—	—		
39	PJ White			—	—		
40	Alan Wilden		Dunedin South	—	—		
41	Andrew Stone		East Coast Bays	—	—		
42	Barbara Steinijans		New Lynn	—	—		
43	John Riddell		Waitakere	49	+6		
44	Carl Peterson		Rotorua	—	—		
45	John Peters		Christchurch East	32	-13		
46	Julie Pepper			47	+1		
47	Tom McClelland		Northland	—	—		
48	Alex Mann		Banks Peninsula	—	—		
49	Michelle Lorenz		Maungakiekie	—	—		
50	Nigel Kearney		Rimutaka	—	—		
51	Nick Kearney		North Shore	—	—		
52	Mark Davies		Piako	—	—		
53	Steve Cox		Hamilton West	—	—		
54	Ray Bassett		Coromandel	35	-19		
55	Brian Davidson		Rakaia	—	—		
56	Rebekah Holdaway		Waimakariri	—	—		
57	Shriley Marshall		Christchurch Central	30	-27		
58	Pat O'Sullivan		Kaikoura	—	—		
59	Garry Mallett		Hamilton East	—	—		

Initially, ACT's list also included Andy Poulsen at 9th place and Roger Greenslade at 21st, but both candidates subsequently withdrew.

=== Green Party ===
Rank	Name	Incumbency	Contesting electorate	Previous rank	Change	Initial results	Later changes
1	Jeanette Fitzsimons	List	Coromandel	1	0	✓ Elected from list	
2	Rod Donald	List	Banks Peninsula	2	0	✓ Elected from list	Died before being sworn in. Replaced by Nándor Tánczos
3	Sue Bradford	List	Northland	3	0	✓ Elected from list	
4	Sue Kedgley	List	Wellington Central	5	+1	✓ Elected from list	
5	Keith Locke	List	Epsom	7	+2	✓ Elected from list	
6	Metiria Turei	List	Te Tai Tonga	8	+2	✓ Elected from list	
7	Nándor Tánczos	List	Auckland Central	4	-3	✗ Lost seat	✓ Replaced Rod Donald in 2005. ✗ Left parliament in 2008
8	Mike Ward	List	Nelson	9	+1	✗ Lost seat	
9	Catherine Delahunty		East Coast	10	+1		
10	Russel Norman			17	+7		✓ Replaced Nándor Tánczos in 2008
11	Steffan Browning		Kaikoura	19	+8		
12	David Clendon		Waitakere	—	—		
13	Luci Highfield		Rongotai	—	—		
14	Jon Carapiet		Mount Albert	13	-1		
15	Roland Sapsford		Ohariu-Belmont	11	-4		
16	Mojo Mathers		Rakaia	—	—		
17	Mikaere Curtis			—	—		
18	Paul Bruce		Hutt South	34	+16		
19	Jeanette Elley		East Coast Bays	42	+23		
20	Mua Strickson-Pua		Mangere	—	—		
21	Richard Davies		West Coast-Tasman	14	-7		
22	Lois Griffiths		Ilam	48	+26		
23	Natalie Cutler-Welsh		Christchurch Central	—	—		
24	Jane Pearce		Otago	—	—		
25	Lawrence O'Halloran		Palmerston North	—	—		
26	Richard Green		New Lynn	46	+20		
27	Claire Bleakley		Wairarapa	—	—		
28	Irene Bentley		Manukau East	—	—		
29	Craig Carson		Invercargill	35	+6		
30	Nicola Harvey		Mana	—	—		
31	Moea Armstrong		Whangarei	—	—		
32	Steve Bayliss		Clevedon	—	—		
33	Laura Beck			—	—		
34	Sarah Brown		New Plymouth	—	—		
35	Terry Creighton		Napier	36	+1		
36	John Davis		Taupo	—	—		
37	Kath Dewar		Te Atatu	—	—		
38	James Diack			—	—		
39	Liz Earth		Tukituki	—	—		
40	Kate Elsen		Aoraki	—	—		
41	Graham Evans		Rodney	—	—		
42	Nick Fisher		Otaki	44	+2		
43	Robert Guyton		Clutha-Southland	—	—		
44	Daniel Howard		Hamilton East	—	—		
45	Philippa Jamieson		Dunedin North	—	—		
46	Stephen Lee		Piako	52	+6		
47	Alan Liefting		Waimakariri	—	—		
48	Mary McCammon		Christchurch East	56	+8		
49	John Milnes		Whanganui	—	—		
50	Michael Morris		Rimutaka	—	—		
51	Noel Peterson		Tauranga	—	—		
52	Paul Qualtrough		Maungakiekie	—	—		
53	Jacob Rawls			—	—		
54	Raewyn Saville		Rotorua	—	—		
55	Ian Stephens		Bay of Plenty	—	—		
56	Richard Suggate		Wigram	—	—		
57	Peter Thomlinson		Dunedin South	—	—		

=== Labour Party ===
Rank	Name	Incumbency	Contesting electorate	Previous rank	Change	Initial results	Later changes
1	Helen Clark	Electorate	Mt Albert	1	0	✓ Won Mt Albert	
2	Michael Cullen	List		2	0	✓ Elected from list	
3	Margaret Wilson	List		9	+6	✓ Elected from list	
4	Steve Maharey	Electorate	Palmerston North	4	0	✓ Won Palmerston North	
5	Parekura Horomia	Electorate	Ikaroa-Rāwhiti	5	0	✓ Won Ikaroa-Rāwhiti	
6	Phil Goff	Electorate	Mt Roskill	6	0	✓ Won Mt Roskill	
7	Annette King	Electorate	Rongotai	7	0	✓ Won Rongotai	
8	Trevor Mallard	Electorate	Hutt South	12	+4	✓ Won Hutt South	
9	Marian Hobbs	Electorate	Wellington Central	17	+8	✓ Won Wellington Central	
10	Dover Samuels	Electorate	Te Tai Tokerau	11	+1	✓ Elected from list	
11	Jim Sutton	Electorate	Aoraki	8	-3	✓ Elected from list	✗ Left parliament in 2006
12	Pete Hodgson	Electorate	Dunedin North	13	+1	✓ Won Dunedin North	
13	Taito Phillip Field	Electorate	Mangere	—	—	✓ Won Mangere	
14	Ruth Dyson	Electorate	Banks Peninsula	22	+8	✓ Won Banks Peninsula	
15	Mita Ririnui	Electorate	Waiariki	32	+17	✓ Elected from list	
16	Mark Burton	Electorate	Taupo	16	0	✓ Won Taupo	
17	Paul Swain	Electorate	Rimutaka	18	+1	✓ Won Rimutaka	
18	Judith Tizard	Electorate	Auckland Central	21	+3	✓ Won Auckland Central	
19	Chris Carter	Electorate	Te Atatu	25	+6	✓ Won Te Atatu	
20	Winnie Laban	Electorate	Mana	20	0	✓ Won Mana	
21	Rick Barker	Electorate	Tukituki	24	+3	✓ Elected from list	
22	Mahara Okeroa	Electorate	Te Tai Tonga	33	+11	✓ Won Te Tai Tonga	
23	David Benson-Pope	Electorate	Dunedin South	36	+13	✓ Won Dunedin South	
24	Jill Pettis	Electorate	Whanganui	27	+3	✓ Elected from list	
25	Ashraf Choudhary	List		40	+15	✓ Elected from list	
26	Lianne Dalziel	Electorate	Christchurch East	14	-12	✓ Won Christchurch East	
27	Shane Jones		Northland	—	—	✓ Elected from list	
28	Dianne Yates	Electorate	Hamilton East	29	+1	✓ Elected from list	✗ Left parliament in 2008
29	Mark Gosche	Electorate	Maungakiekie	10	-19	✓ Won Maungakiekie	
30	Ann Hartley	Electorate	Northcote	35	+5	✓ Elected from list	✗ Left parliament in 2008
31	David Cunliffe	Electorate	New Lynn	37	+6	✓ Won New Lynn	
32	Martin Gallagher	Electorate	Hamilton West	31	-1	✓ Won Hamilton West	
33	Steve Chadwick	Electorate	Rotorua	34	+1	✓ Won Rotorua	
34	Darren Hughes	Electorate	Otaki	51	+17	✓ Won Otaki	
35	Georgina Beyer	Electorate		23	-12	✓ Elected from list	✗ Left parliament in 2007
36	Maryan Street		Taranaki-King Country	—	—	✓ Elected from list	
37	David Parker	Electorate	Otago	47	+10	✓ Elected from list	
38	Russell Fairbrother	Electorate	Napier	—	—	✓ Elected from list	
39	Dave Hereora	List	Clevedon	38	-1	✓ Elected from list	
40	Lynne Pillay	Electorate	Waitakere	39	-1	✓ Won Waitakere	
41	Moana Mackey	List	East Coast	41	0	✓ Elected from list	
42	Sue Moroney		Piako	—	—	✓ Elected from list	
43	Darien Fenton			—	—	✓ Elected from list	
44	Charles Chauvel		Ohariu-Belmont	—	—		✓ Replaced Jim Sutton in 2006
45	Lesley Soper	List		42	-3	✗ Lost seat	✓ Replaced Georgina Beyer in 2007
46	Louisa Wall		Port Waikato	49	+3		✓ Replaced Ann Hartley in 2008
47	William Sio			—	—		✓ Replaced Dianne Yates in 2008
48	Brendon Burns		Kaikoura	48	0		
49	Hamish McCracken		East Coast Bays	52	+3		
50	Denise MacKenzie		Wairarapa	63	+13		
51	Max Purnell		Coromandel	44	-7		
52	Wayne Harpur		Invercargill	—	—		
53	Leila Boyle		Tamaki	57	+4		
54	Dinesh Tailor			65	+11		
55	Phil Twyford		North Shore	—	—		
56	Jen McCutcheon		Nelson	—	—		
57	Chris Yoo			—	—		
58	Michael Wood		Pakuranga	—	—		
59	Linda Hudson			—	—		
60	Stuart Nash		Epsom	—	—		
61	Tony Milne		Rakaia	—	—		
62	David Talbot		Clutha-Southland	—	—		
63	Marilyn Brown		Rangitikei	—	—		
64	Anjum Rahman			—	—		
65	Eamon Daly			53	-12		
66	Judy Lawley		Helensville	—	—		
67	Mike Mora		Wigram	67	0		
68	Erin Ebborn-Gillespie			—	—		
69	Ailian Su			—	—		
70	Ghazala Anwar			—	—		
71	Paul Gibson			60	-11		
72	Kelly-Ann Harvey			—	—		
73	Camille Nakhid			—	—		
74	Ola Kamel			70	-4		
75	Andrea Bather			—	—		

Eight sitting Labour MPs chose not to take list positions, namely: Tim Barnett, Clayton Cosgrove, Harry Duynhoven, George Hawkins, Nanaia Mahuta, Damien O'Connor, Ross Robertson, and John Tamihere. Rumour stated that the Labour Party initially gave George Hawkins a list placing, but that he withdrew after receiving a lower ranking than he had wanted.

Six candidates contested electorates without appearing on the list, namely: Sally Barrett, Julian Blanchard, Paul Chalmers, Tony Dunlop, Errol Mason, and Pauline Scott.

In addition, the Labour Party removed one candidate (Steven Ching) from the list after its first announcement. Ching originally had the ranking of number 42.

=== Māori Party ===
Rank	Name	Incumbency	Contesting electorate	Previous rank	Change	Initial results	Later changes
1	Tariana Turia	Electorate	Te Tai Hauāuru	—	—	✓ Won Te Tai Hauāuru	
2	Pita Sharples		Tāmaki Makaurau	—	—	✓ Won Tāmaki Makaurau	
3	Atareta Poananga		Ikaroa-Rāwhiti	—	—		
4	Simon Wi Rutene			—	—		
5	Glenis Philip-Barbara			(Mana Māori Movement: 3)	-2		
6	Robert Consedine			—	—		
7	Pakake Winiata			—	—		
8	Morris Love		Rongotai	—	—		
9	Angeline Greensill		Tainui	(Mana Māori Movement: 1)	-8		
10	Te Ururoa Flavell		Waiariki	—	—	✓ Won Waiariki	
11	Billy Maea		Taupo	—	—		
12	Monte Ohia		Te Tai Tonga	—	—		
13	Te Orohi Paul		Bay of Plenty	—	—		
14	Bronwyn Yates		Auckland Central	—	—		
15	Charles Joe		Waitakere	—	—		
16	Mama Tere Strickland		Manukau East	—	—		
17	Malcolm Peri		Northland	—	—		
18	Tony Ruakere		New Plymouth	—	—		
19	Hori Awa		Piako	—	—		
20	Brett Cowan		Kaikoura	—	—		
21	Josie Peita		Port Waikato	—	—		
22	Anne Fitzsimon		Nelson	—	—		
23	Abe Hepi		Rangitikei	—	—		
24	Ngahiwi Tomoana		Tukituki	—	—		
25	Tureiti Moxon		Hamilton West	—	—		
26	Aroha Reriti-Crofts			—	—		
27	John Harré		East Coast	—	—		
28	Rangi McLean		Manurewa	—	—		
29	Tell Kuka			—	—		
30	Bill Puru		Maungakiekie	—	—		
31	Mere Rawiri-Tau			—	—		
32	Richard Orzecki		Otaki	—	—		
33	Maraea Ropata		Hutt South	—	—		
34	Sonny Hosking		Mana	—	—		
35	Daryl Gregory		Christchurch Central	—	—		
36	Rangi Tawhiao		Whangarei	—	—		
37	Andre Meihana			—	—		
38	Solomon Matthews		Mangere	—	—		
39	Adell Dick		Rodney	—	—		
40	Gina Haremata-Crawford		Invercargill	—	—		
41	Raewyn Harrison		North Shore	—	—		
42	Celia Hotene			—	—		
43	Awa Hudson		Helensville	—	—		
44	Reimana Johnson			—	—		
45	Rahuia Kapa		East Coast Bays	—	—		
46	David King			—	—		
47	Aaron Makutu		Whanganui	—	—		
48	Kelvin Martin		Te Atatu	—	—		
49	Merehora Taurua			—	—		
50	Francis Waaka		Northcote	—	—		
51	Cissy Walker		Wairarapa	—	—		

Hone Harawira contested Te Tai Tokerau as an electorate-only candidate.

=== National Party ===
Rank	Name	Incumbency	Contesting electorate	Previous rank	Change	Initial results	Later changes
1	Don Brash	List		5	+4	✓ Elected from list	✗ Left parliament in 2007
2	Gerry Brownlee	Electorate	Ilam	9	+7	✓ Won Ilam	
3	Simon Power	Electorate	Rangitikei	13	+10	✓ Won Rangitikei	
4	Bill English	Electorate	Clutha-Southland	1	-3	✓ Won Clutha-Southland	
5	Nick Smith	Electorate	Nelson	3	-2	✓ Won Nelson	
6	Tony Ryall	Electorate	Bay of Plenty	8	+2	✓ Won Bay of Plenty	
7	John Key	Electorate	Helensville	43	+36	✓ Won Helensville	
8	David Carter	List	Banks Peninsula	4	-4	✓ Elected from list	
9	Lockwood Smith	Electorate	Rodney	11	+2	✓ Won Rodney	
10	Katherine Rich	List	Dunedin North	14	+4	✓ Elected from list	
11	Murray McCully	Electorate	East Coast Bays	—	—	✓ Won East Coast Bays	
12	Judith Collins	Electorate	Clevedon	48	+36	✓ Won Clevedon	
13	Tim Groser			—	—	✓ Elected from list	
14	Wayne Mapp	Electorate	North Shore	7	-7	✓ Won North Shore	
15	John Carter	Electorate	Northland	21	+6	✓ Won Northland	
16	Richard Worth	Electorate	Epsom	25	+9	✓ Elected from list	
17	Maurice Williamson	Electorate	Pakuranga	—	—	✓ Won Pakuranga	
18	Clem Simich	Electorate	Māngere	—	—	✓ Elected from list	
19	Georgina te Heuheu	List		6	-13	✓ Elected from list	
20	Pansy Wong	List	Auckland Central	10	-10	✓ Elected from list	
21	Shane Ardern	Electorate	Taranaki-King Country	—	—	✓ Won Taranaki-King Country	
22	Phil Heatley	Electorate	Whangarei	31	+9	✓ Won Whangarei	
23	Paul Hutchison	Electorate	Port Waikato	27	+4	✓ Won Port Waikato	
24	Lindsay Tisch	Electorate	Piako	—	—	✓ Won Piako	
25	Brian Connell	Electorate	Rakaia	—	—	✓ Won Rakaia	✗ Left parliament in 2008
26	Sandra Goudie	Electorate	Coromandel	42	+16	✓ Won Coromandel	
27	Chris Finlayson		Mana	—	—	✓ Elected from list	
28	Nicky Wagner		Christchurch Central	37	+9	✓ Elected from list	
29	Tau Henare	(Former MP)	Te Atatu	35	+6	✓ Elected from list	
30	Allan Peachey		Tāmaki	18	-12	✓ Won Tāmaki	
31	Jo Goodhew		Aoraki	—	—	✓ Won Aoraki	
32	David Bennett		Hamilton East	—	—	✓ Won Hamilton East	
33	Chester Borrows		Whanganui	36	+3	✓ Won Whanganui	
34	Chris Auchinvole		West Coast-Tasman	—	—	✓ Elected from list	
35	Jonathan Coleman		Northcote	—	—	✓ Won Northcote	
36	Mark Blumsky		Wellington Central	—	—	✓ Elected from list	
37	Eric Roy	(Former MP)	Invercargill	26	-11	✓ Won Invercargill	
38	Kate Wilkinson		Waimakariri	—	—	✓ Elected from list	
39	Nathan Guy		Otaki	—	—	✓ Elected from list	
40	Jacqui Dean		Otago	—	—	✓ Won Otago	
41	Jackie Blue		Mount Roskill	—	—	✓ Elected from list	
42	Colin King		Kaikoura	—	—	✓ Won Kaikoura	
43	Anne Tolley	(Former MP)	East Coast	24	-19	✓ Won East Coast	
44	Craig Foss		Tukituki	47	+3	✓ Won Tukituki	
45	Paula Bennett		Waitakere	—	—	✓ Elected from list	
46	Katrina Shanks		Ohariu-Belmont	—	—		✓ Replaced Don Brash in 2007
47	Fepulea'i Ulua'ipou-O-Ma Aiono		Manurewa	—	—		
48	Ravi Musuku		Mount Albert	—	—		
49	Bob Clarkson		Tauranga	—	—	✓ Won Tauranga	
50	John Hayes		Wairarapa	—	—	✓ Won Wairarapa	
51	Moira Irving		New Plymouth	—	—		
52	Chris Tremain		Napier	—	—	✓ Won Napier	
53	Mita Harris		New Lynn	57	+4		
54	Mike Leddy		Rimutaka	—	—		
55	Conway Powell		Dunedin South	—	—		
56	David Round		Christchurch East	—	—		
57	Gilbert Stehbens		Rotorua	—	—		
58	Ken Yee		Manukau East	—	—		
59	Paul Goldsmith		Maungakiekie	—	—		
60	Malcolm Plimmer		Palmerston North	—	—		
61	Nicola Young		Rongotai	—	—		
62	Tim Macindoe		Hamilton West	39	-23		
63	Alison Lomax		Wigram	—	—		
64	Weston Kirton		Taupo	51	-13		
65	Rosemarie Thomas		Hutt South	—	—		

=== New Zealand First ===
Rank	Name	Incumbency	Contesting electorate	Previous rank	Change	Initial results	Later changes
1	Winston Peters	Electorate	Tauranga	1	0	✓ Elected from list	
2	Peter Brown	List	Bay of Plenty	2	0	✓ Elected from list	
3	Brian Donnelly	List	Whangarei	3	0	✓ Elected from list	✗ Left parliament in 2008
4	Ron Mark	List	Waimakariri	4	0	✓ Elected from list	
5	Doug Woolerton	List	Hamilton East	5	0	✓ Elected from list	
6	Barbara Stewart	List	Piako	6	0	✓ Elected from list	
7	Pita Paraone	List	Pakuranga	7	0	✓ Elected from list	
8	Susan Baragwanath		Auckland Central	—	—		
9	Jim Peters	List	Northland	9	0	✗ Lost seat	
10	Dail Jones	List	Helensville	10	0	✗ Lost seat	✓ Replaced Brian Donnelly in 2008
11	Craig McNair	List	Rodney	8	-3	✗ Lost seat	
12	Edwin Perry	List	Wairarapa	11	-1	✗ Lost seat	
13	Bill Gudgeon	List	Hamilton West	12	-1	✗ Lost seat	
14	Brent Catchpole	List	Clevedon	13	-1	✗ Lost seat	
15	Joe Williams		Maungakiekie	—	—		
16	John Foote		Coromandel	—	—		
17	Fletcher Tabuteau		Rotorua	18	+1		
18	Alan Heward		Dunedin South	—	—		
19	Kristin Campbell Smith		Taupo	—	—		
20	Kerry Lundy		Aoraki	—	—		
21	David Fowler		Rimutaka	—	—		
22	Brendan Stewart		Waitakere	—	—		
23	Brett Webster		Tamaki	16	-7		
24	Bob Daw		Port Waikato	19	-5		
25	Murray Strawbridge		Rangitikei	—	—		
26	Moetu Davis		Te Atatu	—	—		
27	Toa Greening		Mangere	—	—		
28	Dave Mackie		Clutha-Southland	20	-8		
29	Anne Martin		East Coast Bays	—	—		
30	Julian Batchelor		Mount Albert	—	—		
31	Chris Perry		Otaki	—	—		
32	Lindy Palmer		Manurewa	—	—		
33	Brian Roswell		Wigram	—	—		
34	Joe Glen		East Coast	—	—		
35	James Mist		Napier	—	—		
36	Howard Levarko		Hutt South	—	—		
37	Paul Trevor Manning		Northcote	—	—		
38	Tim Manu		Ohariu-Belmont	—	—		
39	Kevin Gardener		Christchurch Central	—	—		
40	Graham Odering		Palmerston North	—	—		

=== Jim Anderton's Progressive ===
Rank	Name	Incumbency	Contesting electorate	Previous rank	Change	Initial results	Later changes
1	Jim Anderton	Electorate	Wigram	1	0	✓ Won Wigram	
2	Matt Robson	List	Tamaki	2	0	✗ Lost seat	
3	Grant Gillon	(Former MP)	Northcote	3	0		
4	Megan Woods		Christchurch Central	—	—		
5	John Wright	(Former MP)	Waimakariri	4	-1		
6	Sione Fonua		Maungakiekie	—	—		
7	Vivienne Shepherd		Whangarei	18	+11		
8	Meng Ly		Pakuranga	8	0		
9	Fatima Ashrafi		Epsom	—	—		
10	Barry Wilson			—	—		
11	Fale Leleisiuao		Mana	—	—		
12	Russell Franklin		Otaki	20	+8		
13	Paula Gillon		North Shore	—	—		
14	Phil Clearwater		Banks Peninsula	11	-3		
15	Trevor Barnard		Manukau East	19	+4		
16	Raghbir Singh		Manurewa	—	—		
17	Brenda Hill		Clevedon	—	—		
18	Fiona Beazley		East Coast Bays	—	—		
19	Russell Caldwell		Te Tai Tonga	—	—		
20	David Reeks		Taupo	—	—		
21	John Maurice		Kaikoura	—	—		
22	Mohammad Kazemi Yazdi		New Lynn	—	—		
23	Heka Heker (Taefu)		Invercargill	—	—		
24	Veronique Stewart-Ward		Bay of Plenty	—	—		
25	Zemin Zhang		Ilam	—	—		
26	Julian Aaron		Helensville	—	—		
27	Suki Amirapu		Mount Roskill	—	—		
28	Anette Anderson		Coromandel	21	-7		
29	Sukhdev Bains		Hamilton West	—	—		
30	Peter Banks		Hamilton East	—	—		
31	James Boyack		Dunedin North	—	—		
32	Ian Donald		Piako	—	—		
33	Lew Holland		West Coast-Tasman	—	—		
34	Karandeep Singh Lall		Tauranga	—	—		
35	Jacqueline McAlpine		Nelson	—	—		
36	Claire Main		Aoraki	—	—		
37	Phillipa Main		Rakaia	45	+8		
38	James Palmer			—	—		
39	Max Panirau		Port Waikato	—	—		
40	David Parkyn		Waitakere	49	+9		
41	Dawn Patchett		Palmerston North	50	+9		
42	Tala Po'e		Mangere	—	—		
43	Pavitra Roy		Te Atatu	—	—		
44	Elspeth Sandys		Ohariu-Belmont	—	—		
45	Tony Sharrock		Rodney	—	—		
46	Barry Silcock		Otago	—	—		
47	Karen Silcock		Christchurch East	—	—		
48	David Somerset		Wellington Central	—	—		
49	Petronella Townsend		Auckland Central	—	—		
50	Martin Vaughan		Dunedin South	—	—		
51	Jenny Wilson		Mount Albert	—	—		

=== United Future New Zealand ===
Rank	Name	Component Party	Incumbency	Contesting electorate	Previous rank	Change	Initial results	Later changes
1	Peter Dunne	—	Electorate	Ohariu-Belmont	1	0	✓ Won Ohariu-Belmont	
2	Judy Turner	—	List	East Coast	8	+6	✓ Elected from list	
3	Gordon Copeland	—	List	Rongotai	2	-1	✓ Elected from list	Became independent MP in 2008
4	Marc Alexander	—	List	Ilam	4	0	✗ Lost seat	
5	Larry Baldock	—	List	Tauranga	7	+2	✗ Lost seat	
6	Murray Smith	—	List	Tamaki	6	0	✗ Lost seat	
7	Paul Check	ORNZ		Taupo	(ORNZ: 3)	-4		
8	Janet Tuck	—		Epsom	—	—		
9	Bernie Ogilvy	—	List	Maungakiekie	3	-6	✗ Lost seat	
10	Graeme Reeves	—		Wairarapa	—	—		
11	Russell Judd	—		Rotorua	16	+5		
12	Hannah Baral	—		Waitakere	—	—		
13	Joy Lietze	—		Clutha-Southland	53	+40		
14	Neville Wilson	—		Mangere	—	—		
15	Richard Barter	—		Mount Roskill	—	—		
16	Steve Taylor	—		Auckland Central	29	+13		
17	Ian McInnes	—		Pakuranga	18	+1		
18	Ross Tizard	—		North Shore	27	+9		
19	Fiona McKenzie	—		Wellington Central	—	—		
20	Graeme Barr	—		Rakaia	46	+26		
21	John Walker	ORNZ		Clevedon	—	—		
22	Ram Parkash	—		Manukau East	48	+26		
23	Ralph Kennard	—		Invercargill	—	—		
24	Jayati Prasad	—		Port Waikato	—	—		
25	Vanessa Roberts	—		Wigram	—	—		
26	Gerald Telford	ORNZ		Otago	—	—		
27	Robin Loomes	—		Banks Peninsula	—	—		
28	Robyn Jackson	—		Hamilton West	—	—		
29	Tony Gordon	—		Mount Albert	—	—		
30	Greg Graydon	—		Tamaki	—	—		
31	Martyn Seddon	—		Piako	25	-6		
32	Bernard McClelland	—		Rimutaka	—	—		
33	Beth Stone	ORNZ		Northcote	—	—		
34	Robin Westley	—		Kaikoura	—	—		
35	Anne Drake	—		New Lynn	17	-18		
36	Noel Hinton	—		Manurewa	—	—		
37	Michael Satur	—			—	—		
38	Diane Brown	—		Otaki	—	—		
39	Steve Dromgool	—			—	—		
40	Andrea Deeth	—		Helensville	20	-20		
41	Mark Peters	—		Dunedin North	—	—		
42	Pauline Moffat	—		Dunedin South	—	—		
43	Dennis Wells	—		Nelson	60	+17		
44	Milton Osborne	ORNZ		West Coast-Tasman	—	—		
45	Gary Pedersen	ORNZ			—	—		
46	John Pickering	—		Waimakariri	—	—		
47	Adam Archer	ORNZ		Hamilton East	—	—		
48	Neil Linscott	ORNZ			—	—		
49	Barry Hayes	—			—	—		
50	Janita Stuart	—			—	—		
51	Dianne Wilson	—		Christchurch East	—	—		
52	James Rudd	ORNZ			(ORNZ: 11)	-41		
53	Peter Mountain	ORNZ		Rodney	—	—		
54	Lee Robertson	—		Coromandel	37	-17		
55	John van Buren	WIN		Christchurch Central	—	—		
56	Jeff Leigh	—		Bay of Plenty	—	—		
57	Matt Collier	—		New Plymouth	—	—		

For the 2005 election, United Future affiliated with Outdoor Recreation NZ and the WIN Party. Both parties stood their member or members as United Future members instead of standing under their own party banner.

Initially, Paul Adams and his daughter Sharee Adams appeared on the list, ranked 10th and 17th, respectively. Adams later decided to stand as an independent, however, and his daughter also withdrew.

== Unsuccessful registered parties ==
The following registered parties did not gain representation:

=== 99 MP Party ===
Rank	Name	Incumbency	Contesting electorate	Initial results	Later changes
1	Margaret Robertson				
2	Ramasmy Ramanathan				

=== Alliance ===
Rank	Name	Incumbency	Contesting electorate	Previous rank	Change	Initial results	Later changes
1	Jill Ovens		Manukau East	12	+11		
2	Paul Piesse			—	—		
3	Andrew McKenzie		Banks Peninsula	—	—		
4	Julie Fairey			16	+12		
5	Kane O'Connell		Wellington Central	—	—		
6	Len Richards		Mangere	23	+17		
7	Jim Flynn			—	—		
8	Victor Billot		Dunedin North	—	—		
9	Margaret Jeune		Otaki	33	+24		
10	Bob van Ruyssevelt		Te Atatu	48	+38		
11	Tom Dowie		Wigram	—	—		
12	Chris Ford		Dunedin South	—	—		
13	Quentin Findlay			—	—		
14	Kelly Buchanan		Mana	—	—		
15	Joe Hendren			—	—		
16	Gail Marmont			—	—		
17	Paul Protheroe		Manurewa	41	+24		
18	Greg Kleis		Kaikoura	—	—		
19	Sandra Ethell			—	—		
20	Colin Pounder			—	—		
21	Bob Harrison			—	—		
22	Peta Knibb			—	—		
23	Marvin Hubbard			—	—		
24	Francie Haslemore			—	—		
25	Norman MacRitchie			—	—		
26	Eric Gamble			—	—		
27	Lynda Boyd		Christchurch East	—	—		
28	Jocelyn Brooks		Rongotai	—	—		
29	Nick Corlett			—	—		
30	Nick Scullin			—	—		

=== Aotearoa Legalise Cannabis Party ===
Rank	Name	Incumbency	Contesting electorate	Previous rank	Change	Initial results	Later changes
1	Michael Appleby		Wellington Central	1	0		
2	Michael Britnell		Waimakariri	2	0		
3	Judy Daniels		Te Tai Tokerau	8	+5		
4	Paula Lambert			10	+6		
5	Irinka Britnell			3	-2		
6	Kevin Patrick O'Connell		Christchurch East	—	—		
7	Paul McMullan			7	0		
8	Steven Wilkinson		West Coast-Tasman	—	—		
9	Judy Matangi			9	0		
10	Jason Baker-Sherman		Dunedin North	—	—		
11	Peter Green			12	+1		
12	Neville Yates			—	—		
13	Philip Pophristoff			—	—		

=== Christian Heritage NZ ===
Rank	Name	Incumbency	Contesting electorate	Previous rank	Change	Initial results	Later changes
1	Ewen McQueen		Pakuranga	—	—		
2	Derek Blight		West Coast-Tasman	—	—		
3	Nick Barber		Nelson	10	+7		
4	Betty Jenkins		Te Atatu	—	—		
5	Mark Jones		Taranaki-King Country	—	—		
6	Joy Jones			—	—		

=== Democrats For Social Credit ===
Rank	Name	Incumbency	Contesting electorate	Previous rank	Change	Initial results	Later changes
1	Stephnie de Ruyter			(Progressive: 5)	+4		
2	John Pemberton			(Progressive: 16)	+14		
3	David Wilson			(Progressive: 12)	+9		
4	Richard Prosser		Otago	—	—		
5	John Steemson		East Coast Bays	—	—		
6	Katherine Ransom		Tauranga	—	—		
7	John Kilbride			(Progressive: 42)	+35		
8	Mark Atkin			—	—		
9	Heather M. Smith			(Progressive: 55)	+46		
10	David Tranter			—	—		
11	Ken Goodhue			—	—		
12	Malcom Murchie		Whanganui	—	—		
13	Ross Weddell			(Progressive: 59)	+46		
14	David Espin			(Progressive: 33)	+19		
15	Ross Hayward			—	—		
16	Bruce Stirling		Invercargill	—	—		
17	Karl Hewlett			—	—		
18	Ron England			—	—		
19	Kelly Pemberton			—	—		
20	Bob Warren			—	—		
21	David Wood			—	—		
22	Mary Weddell			—	—		
23	Allen Cookson			—	—		
24	Barry Pulford			(Progressive: 61)	+37		
25	Hessel van Wieren			(Progressive: 58)	+33		
26	Alida Steemson			—	—		
27	Bob Fox			(Progressive: 31)	+4		
28	Coralie Leyland			—	—		
29	John Rawson			—	—		

For the 2002 election, the Democrats for Social Credit had been part of Jim Anderton's Progressive Coalition, but split shortly after that election.

=== Destiny New Zealand ===
Rank	Name	Incumbency	Contesting electorate	Initial results	Later changes
1	Richard Lewis		Manukau East		
2	David Jesze		Pakuranga		
3	Elaine Herbert		Rotorua		
4	Hadyn Solomon		Tainui		
5	Nigel Heslop		Northcote		
6	Edward Saafi		Mangere		
7	Anita Breach		Christchurch Central		
8	Charles Te Kowhai		Taupo		
9	David Knight		Hutt South		
10	Hawea Vercoe		Waiariki		
11	Neils Jensen		Tauranga		
12	Tauwehe Hemahema-Tamati		Tamaki Makaurau		
13	Rod Gabb		Epsom		
14	Hemi Te Wano		Te Tai Hauauru		
15	Stephen Sinnott		Napier		
16	Anne Williamson		Mount Albert		
17	Kerin Roberts		New Plymouth		
18	Peter Johnston		Coromandel		
19	John Kotoisuva		Te Atatu		
20	Karen Penney		New Lynn		
21	Colin Ranby		Piako		
22	Tala Leiasamaivao		Mana		
23	Paul Hubble				
24	Roberta Maxwell		Bay of Plenty		
25	Tony Harrison		Taranaki-King Country		
26	Brent Daglish		Dunedin South		
27	Jason Thomson		Nelson		
28	Maru Samuel		Te Tai Tonga		
29	Stephen Brown				
30	Bill Sadler		East Coast		
31	Ernest Morton		Te Tai Tokerau		
32	Ned So'e		Maungakiekie		
33	David Isaachsen		Northland		
34	Mason Lee		Clevedon		
35	Stan Green		Waitakere		
36	Patrick Komene		Manurewa		
37	Tony Ford		Whangarei		
38	Maureen Vincent		Auckland Central		
39	Albert Wipani				
40	Brian Ane		Mount Roskill		
41	Tauha Te Kani		Ikaroa-Rawhiti		
42	Rod Keven		Port Waikato		

=== Direct Democracy Party ===
Rank	Name	Incumbency	Contesting electorate	Initial results	Later changes
1	Kelvyn Alp		Manurewa		
2	Paul Teio		Mangere		
3	Dilip Rupa		Auckland Central		
4	Patrick Fahy		East Coast Bays		
5	Mike Francis-Roberson		Bay of Plenty		
6	Simon Guy		Otago		
7	Gary Burch		New Lynn		
8	Kevin Smith		New Plymouth		
9	Kevin Moore		Pakuranga		
10	Kyle Chapman		Christchurch East		
11	Rex Newey		Nelson		
12	Gregory Trichon		Te Atatu		
13	Alona Covich		Waitakere		
14	Eugene Opai		Tamaki Makaurau		
15	Seira Perese		Manukau East		
16	Tin Chan		Epsom		
17	Helen Koster		Helensville		
18	Craig Stratton		Port Waikato		
19	Alastair Anderson		Maungakiekie		
20	Anton Foljambe		Wigram		
21	Robert T Atack		Otaki		
22	Leanne Martinovich		Clevedon		
23	Grant Burch		Tamaki		
24	Howard Ponga		Mount Albert		
25	John Sullivan		Aoraki		
26	Colin Punter		Rodney		
27	Mel Whaanga		Northland		
28	Jason Anderson		Mana		
29	Jason Orme		Waimakariri		
30	Barry Scott		Mount Roskill		
31	Scott Burch		Tukituki		
32	Craig Guy		Invercargill		

=== Libertarianz ===
Rank	Name	Incumbency	Contesting electorate	Previous rank	Change	Initial results	Later changes
1	Bernard Darnton		Wellington Central	4	+3		
2	Julian Pistorius		Northland	—	—		
3	Tim Wikiriwhi		Hamilton West	—	—		
4	Susan Ryder			—	—		
5	Peter Cresswell			11	+6		
6	Colin Cross		Ohariu-Belmont	—	—		
7	Helen Hughes		Whangarei	28	+21		
8	Russell Watkins		Tauranga	27	+19		
9	Peter Linton		Northcote	6	-3		
10	Mike Webber		New Plymouth	25	+15		
11	Robin Thomsen		Hamilton East	—	—		
12	Philip Howison		Hutt South	—	—		
13	Michael Murphy		North Shore	21	+8		
14	Tina White			5	-9		
15	Andrew Bates			20	+5		
16	Richard Goode			—	—		
17	Luke Howison			—	—		
18	Christopher Robertson			24	+6		
19	Peter Osborne			—	—		
20	Barry Cole			—	—		
21	Don Rowberry			—	—		
22	Willem Verhoeven			—	—		
23	Elliot Smith			—	—		
24	Nikolas Haden			23	-1		
25	Terrence Verhoeven			23	-2		
26	Keith Patterson			17	-9		
27	Kenneth Riddle			30	+3		
27	Robert Palmer			—	—		

The Libertarianz party did not contest the 2002 general election. The 'previous rank' and 'change' columns above compare against the 1999 list.

=== New Zealand Family Rights Protection Party ===
Rank	Name	Incumbency	Contesting electorate	Initial results	Later changes
1	Susi Pa'o Williams		Mangere		
2	Tapu Po-Wihongi		Manukau East		
3	Christine Reid		Maungakiekie		
4	Lale Ene-Ulugia		Clevedon		
5	John Ulberg		Waitakere		
6	Anne Kerisome Zekaria Strickland				
7	Siniva Papali'i				
8	Amelia Malia Fepulea'i		Manurewa		
9	Tangata Greig				
10	Stella Browne-Knowles		Te Atatu		
11	Papali'i Malietoa				
12	Edward Ulberg				
13	Etevise Fuiava				
14	Souvenir Sanerivi				
15	Manogitulua Livapulu-Head				
16	Kearlene Ulberg				
17	Christie Greig				
18	Rafaele Vaifale				

Susi Pa'o Williams was on the party list for Jim Anderton's Progressive Coalition in 2002, where they were ranked ninth.

=== OneNZ ===
Rank	Name	Incumbency	Contesting electorate	Previous rank	Change	Initial results	Later changes
1	Ian Brougham		Whanganui	—	—		
2	Richard Fisher			5	+3		
3	James White			2	-1		
4	John Porter			1	-3		
5	Janet Walters			—	—		
6	Lanya Murray			—	—		

=== Outdoor Recreation ===
In the 2005 elections, Outdoor Recreation NZ stood in affiliation with United Future, and all Outdoor Recreation candidates stood under the United Future banner. Outdoor Recreation therefore had no list of its own. However, the United Future section of this page identifies those candidates attached to Outdoor Recreation.

=== The Republic of New Zealand Party ===
Rank	Name	Incumbency	Contesting electorate	Initial results	Later changes
1	Kerry Bevin				
2	Wayne Hawkins				
3	Debbie Potroz		Taupo		
4	Jack Gielen		Hamilton West		
5	Steven Hart		Port Waikato		
6	Gilbert Parker				
