= Candidates in the 2005 New Zealand general election by electorate =

New Zealand political candidates in the MMP era
Year	Party list	Candidates
1996	party lists	by electorate
1999	party lists	by electorate
2002	party lists	by electorate
2005	party lists	by electorate
2008	party lists	by electorate
2011	party lists	by electorate
2014	party lists	by electorate
2017	party lists	by electorate
2020	party lists	by electorate
2023	party lists	by electorate
2026	party lists	by electorate

This page lists candidates in New Zealand's 2005 general election, grouping them by the electorate that they contested. See also candidates by party and party lists.

== General electorates ==
=== Aoraki ===
Name	Party	Notes
Elsen, Kate	Green Party	
Goodhew, Jo	National Party	winner
Lundy, Kerry	New Zealand First	
Main, Claire	Jim Anderton's Progressive	
Murray, Kevin	ACT New Zealand	
Rogers, Mark	United Future New Zealand	
Sullivan, John	Direct Democracy Party	
Sutton, Jim	Labour Party	Incumbent (defeated); elected off party list

=== Auckland Central ===
Name	Party	Notes
Baragwanath, Susan	New Zealand First	
Berry, Stephen	Libertarianz	
Candy, Alan	NZ Republicans	
Forde, Thomas	Independent	
Rupa, Dilip	Direct Democracy Party	
Simpson, Helen	ACT New Zealand	
Tanczos, Nandor	Green Party	List MP; elected off party list after death of Rod Donald
Taylor, Steve	United Future New Zealand	
Tizard, Judith	Labour Party	Incumbent (re-elected)
Townsend, Petronella	Jim Anderton's Progressive	
Vincent, Maureen	Destiny New Zealand	
Wong, Pansy	National Party	List MP; elected off party list
Yates, Bronwyn	Māori Party	

=== Banks Peninsula ===
Name	Party	Notes
Carter, David	National Party	List MP, elected off party list
Clearwater, Phil	Jim Anderton's Progressive	
Donald, Rod	Green Party	party co-leader; List MP; elected off party list, died before first sitting of parliament
Dyson, Ruth	Labour Party	Incumbent (re-elected)
Loomes, Robin	United Future New Zealand	
McKenzie, Andrew	Alliance	
Mann, Alex	ACT New Zealand	

=== Bay of Plenty ===
Name	Party	Notes
Brown, Peter	New Zealand First	List MP; deputy leader, elected off party list
Leigh, Jeff	United Future New Zealand	
Maxwell, Roberta	Destiny New Zealand	
Paul, Te Orohi	Māori Party	
Roberson, Mike	Direct Democracy Party	
Ryall, Tony	National Party	Incumbent (re-elected)
Scott, Pauline	Labour Party	
Stephens, Ian	Green Party	
Stewart-Ward, Veronique	Jim Anderton's Progressive	

=== Christchurch Central ===
Name	Party	Notes
Barnett, Tim	Labour Party	Incumbent (re-elected)
Breach, Anita	Destiny New Zealand	
Clark, Byron	Anti-Capitalist Alliance	
Cutler-Welsh, Natalie	Green Party	
Gardener, Kevin	New Zealand First	
Gregory, Daryl	Māori Party	
Marshall, Shirley	ACT New Zealand	
van Buren, John	United Future New Zealand	
Vermunt, Annalucia	Communist League	
Wagner, Nicky	National Party	elected off party list
Woods, Megan	Jim Anderton's Progressive	

=== Christchurch East ===
Name	Party	Notes
Boyd, Linda	Alliance	
Chapman, Kyle	Direct Democracy Party	
Dalziel, Lianne	Labour Party	Incumbent (re-elected)
Hopkinson, Paul	Anti-Capitalist Alliance	
McCammon, Mary	Green Party	
O'Connell, Patrick	Aotearoa Legalise Cannabis Party	
Peters, John	ACT New Zealand	
Round, David	National Party	
Silcock, Karen	Jim Anderton's Progressive	
Wilson, Dianne	United Future New Zealand	

=== Clevedon ===
Name	Party	Notes
Bayliss, Steve	Green Party	
Catchpole, Brent	New Zealand First	List MP; not returned to Parliament
Collins, Judith	National Party	Incumbent (re-elected)
Ene-Ulugia, Lale	New Zealand Family Rights Protection Party	
Hereora, Dave	Labour Party	elected off party list
Hill, Brenda	Jim Anderton's Progressive	
Lee, Mason	Destiny New Zealand	
Martinovich, Leanne	Direct Democracy Party	
Ogilvie, Iain	ACT New Zealand	
Walker, John	United Future New Zealand	

=== Clutha-Southland ===
Name	Party	Notes
English, Bill	National Party	Incumbent (re-elected)
Fraser, John	ACT New Zealand	
Guyton, Robert	Green Party	
Lietze, Joy	United Future New Zealand	
Mackie, Dave	New Zealand First	
Talbot, David	Labour Party	
Webber, David	Independent	

=== Coromandel ===
Name	Party	Notes
Anderson, Annette	Jim Anderton's Progressive	
Bassett, Ray	ACT New Zealand	
Fitzsimons, Jeanette	Green Party	List MP, Party Co-Leader; MP for Coromandel 1999–2002; elected off party list
Foote, John	New Zealand First	
Goudie, Sandra	National Party	Incumbent (re-elected)
Johnston, Peter	Destiny New Zealand	
Purnell, Max	Labour Party	
Robertson, Lee	United Future New Zealand	

=== Dunedin North ===
Name	Party	Notes
Baker-Sherman, Jason	Aotearoa Legalise Cannabis Party	
Billot, Victor	Alliance	
Boyack, James	Jim Anderton's Progressive	
Hodgson, Pete	Labour Party	Incumbent (re-elected)
Jamieson, Philippa	Green Party	
Martin, Willie	ACT New Zealand	
Peters, Mark	United Future New Zealand	
Rich, Katherine	National Party	List MP; elected off party list

=== Dunedin South ===
Name	Party	Notes
Benson-Pope, David	Labour Party	Incumbent (re-elected)
Daglish, Brent	Destiny New Zealand	
Ford, Chris	Alliance	
Heward, Alan	New Zealand First	
Moffat, Pauline	United Future New Zealand	
Powell, Conway	National Party	
Thomlinson, Peter	Green Party	
Vaughan, Martin	Jim Anderton's Progressive	
Wansink, Robert	Restore All Things in Christ	
Wilden, Alan	ACT New Zealand	

=== East Coast ===
open seat - incumbent Labour MP Janet Elsdon Mackey retired in 2005

Name	Party	Notes
Delahunty, Catherine	Green Party	
Glen, Joe	New Zealand First	
Harré, John	Māori Party	
Mackey, Moana	Labour Party	List MP; elected off party list
Sadler, Bill	Destiny New Zealand	
Tolley, Anne	National Party	Former MP 1999–02; winner
Turner, Judy	United Future New Zealand	List MP; elected off party list

=== East Coast Bays ===
Name	Party	Notes
Adams, Paul	Independent	Former United Future List MP; not returned to Parliament
Beazley, Fiona	Jim Anderton's Progressive	
Elley, Jeanette	Green Party	
Fahy, Patrick	Direct Democracy Party	
Kapa, Rahuia	Māori Party	
Martin, Anne	New Zealand First	
McCracken, Hamish	Labour Party	
McCully, Murray	National Party	Incumbent (re-elected)
Steemson, John	Democrats For Social Credit	
Stone, Andrew	ACT New Zealand	

=== Epsom ===
Name	Party	Notes
Ashrafi, Fatima	Jim Anderton's Progressive	
Chan, Tin	Direct Democracy Party	
Gabb, Rod	Destiny New Zealand	
Hide, Rodney	ACT New Zealand	List MP, Party Leader, winner
Locke, Keith	Green Party	List MP; elected from party list
Nash, Stuart	Labour Party	
Tuck, Janet	United Future New Zealand	
van den Heuvel, Anthony	Human Rights	
Worth, Richard	National Party	Incumbent (defeated); returned to Parliament off party list

=== Hamilton East ===
Name	Party	Notes
Archer, Adam	United Future New Zealand	
Banks, Peter	Jim Anderton's Progressive	
Bennett, David	National Party	winner
Biasiny-Tule, Potaua	Māori Party	
Howard, Daniel	Green Party	
Mallett, Garry	ACT New Zealand	
Phillips, Jared	Anti-Capitalist Alliance	
Thomsen, Robin	Libertarianz	
Woolerton, Doug	New Zealand First	List MP; elected off party list
Yates, Dianne	Labour Party	Incumbent (defeated); elected off party list

=== Hamilton West ===
Name	Party	Notes
Bains, Sukhdev	Jim Anderton's Progressive	
Cox, Steve	ACT New Zealand	
Gallagher, Martin	Labour Party	Incumbent (re-elected)
Gielen, Jack	The Republic Of New Zealand Party	
Gudgeon, Bill	New Zealand First	List MP; not returned to Parliament
Jackson, Robyn	United Future New Zealand	
Macindoe, Tim	National Party	
Moxon, Tureiti	Māori Party	
Suresh, Vatsyayann	Independent	
Wikiriwhi, Tim	Libertarianz	

=== Helensville ===
Name	Party	Notes
Aaron, Julian	Jim Anderton's Progressive	
Deeth, Andrea	United Future New Zealand	
Hudson, Awa	Māori Party	
Jones, Dail	New Zealand First	List MP; not returned at election, but returned to Parliament on the resignation of Brian Donnelly
Key, John	National Party	Incumbent (re-elected)
Koster, Helen	Direct Democracy Party	
Langford-Tebby, Stephen	ACT New Zealand	
Lawley, Judy	Labour Party	

=== Hutt South ===
Name	Party	Notes
Bruce, Paul	Green Party	
Howison, Philip	Libertarianz	
Knight, David	Destiny New Zealand	
Levarko, Howard	New Zealand First	
Mallard, Trevor	Labour Party	Incumbent (re-elected)
McSeveney, Jack	Independent	
Mitchell, Lindsay	ACT New Zealand	
Ropata, Maraea	Māori Party	
Smith, Murray	United Future New Zealand	List MP; not returned to Parliament
Thomas, Rosemarie	National Party	

=== Ilam ===
Name	Party	Notes
Alexander, Marc	United Future New Zealand	List MP; not returned to Parliament
Anderson, Blair	Independent	
Blanchard, Julian	Labour Party	
Brownlee, Gerry	National Party	Incumbent (re-elected)
Findley, Quentin	Alliance	
Giles, Jo	ACT New Zealand	
Griffiths, Lois	Green Party	
Zhang, Zemin	Jim Anderton's Progressive	

=== Invercargill ===
open seat - Sitting MP Mark Peck retired in 2005

Name	Party	Notes
Beker, Ian	ACT New Zealand	
Carson, Craig	Green Party	
Guy, Craig	Direct Democracy Party	
Haremate-Crawford, Gina	Māori Party	
Harpur, Wayne	Labour Party	
Kennard, Ralph	United Future New Zealand	
Roy, Eric	National Party	Former MP; winner
Stirling, Bruce	Democrats For Social Credit	
Taefu, Heka	Jim Anderton's Progressive	

=== Kaikoura ===
open seat - incumbent National MP Lynda Scott retired in 2005

Name	Party	Notes
Browning, Steffan	Green Party	
Burns, Brendon	Labour Party	
Cowan, Brett	Māori Party	
Howard, Ted	Independent	
King, Colin	National Party	winner
Kleis, Greg	Alliance	
Maurice, John	Jim Anderton's Progressive	
O'Sullivan, Pat	ACT New Zealand	
Westley, Kaikoura	United Future New Zealand	

=== Mana ===
Name	Party	Notes
Anderson, Jason	Direct Democracy Party	
Buchanan, Kelly	Alliance	
Collins, Michael	ACT New Zealand	
Finlayson, Chris	National Party	elected off party list
Freemantle, Jasmine	Anti-Capitalist Alliance	
Gunson, Robin	United Future New Zealand	
Harvey, Nicola	Green Party	
Hosking, Sonny	Māori Party	
Laban, Winnie	Labour Party	Incumbent (re-elected)
Leiasamaivao, Tala	Destiny New Zealand	
Leleisiuao, Fale	Jim Anderton's Progressive	

=== Mangere ===
Name	Party	Notes
Field, Taito Phillip	Labour Party	Incumbent (re-elected)
Greening, Toa	New Zealand First	
Matthews, Solomon	Māori Party	
Muller, Mark	Anti-Capitalist Alliance	
Pa'o Williams, Susi	New Zealand Family Rights Protection Party	
Po'e, Tala	Jim Anderton's Progressive	
Richards, Len	Alliance	
Saafi, Edward	Destiny New Zealand	
Simich, Clem	National Party	Former MP for Tamaki; returned off party list
Strickson-Pua, Mua	Green Party	
Teio, Paul	Direct Democracy Party	
Wilson, Neville	United Future New Zealand	

=== Manukau East ===
Name	Party	Notes
Barnard, Trevor	Jim Anderton's Progressive	
Bentley, Irene	Green Party	
Lewis, Richard	Destiny New Zealand	Party Leader
Ovens, Jill	Alliance	Party Co-Leader
Parkash, Ram	United Future New Zealand	
Perese, Seira	Direct Democracy Party	
Po-Wihongi, Tapu Anne	New Zealand Family Rights Protection Party	
Robertson, Ross	Labour Party	Incumbent (re-elected)
Stevens, Hamish	ACT New Zealand	
Subramanian, Raj	Independent	
Tahere, Mama Tere Strickland	Māori Party	
Yee, Ken	National Party	

=== Manurewa ===
Name	Party	Notes
Aiono, Fepulea'i Ulua'ipou-O-Malo	National Party	
Alp, Kelvyn	Direct Democracy Party	Party Leader
Fepulea'i, Amelia Malia	New Zealand Family Rights Protection Party	
Hawkins, George	Labour Party	Incumbent (re-elected)
Hinton, Noel	United Future New Zealand	
Komene, Patrick	Destiny New Zealand	
McLean, Rangi	Māori Party	
Palmer, Lindy	New Zealand First	
Protheroe, Paul	Alliance	
Singh, Raghbir	Jim Anderton's Progressive	
Snelgar, Glen	ACT New Zealand	

=== Maungakiekie ===
Name	Party	Notes
Anderson, Alastair	Direct Democracy Party	
Berg, Bevan	NZ Republicans	
Brown, Patrick	Communist League	
Fonua, Sione	Jim Anderton's Progressive	
Goldsmith, Paul	National Party	
Gosche, Mark	Labour Party	Incumbent (re-elected)
Lorenz, Michelle	ACT New Zealand	
Ogilvy, Bernie	United Future New Zealand	List MP; not returned to Parliament
Puru, Bill	Māori Party	
Qualtrough, Paul	Green Party	
Reid, Christine	New Zealand Family Rights Protection Party	
So'e, Ned	Destiny New Zealand	
Williams, Joe	New Zealand First	Former Cook Islands PM

=== Mount Albert ===
Name	Party	Notes
Bagnall, James	Independent	
Batchelor, Julian	New Zealand First	
Carapiet, John	Green Party	
Clark, Helen	Labour Party	Incumbent (re-elected), Prime Minister
Gordon, Tony	United Future New Zealand	
Musuku, Ravi	National Party	
Ponga, Howard	Direct Democracy Party	
Ravlich, Anthony	Human Rights	
Seymour, David	ACT New Zealand	
Taylor, Erik	Independent	
Whitmore, Daphna	Anti-Capitalist Alliance	
Williamson, Anne	Destiny New Zealand	
Wilson, Jenny	Jim Anderton's Progressive	

=== Mount Roskill ===
Name	Party	Notes
Amirapu, Sukerna	Jim Anderton's Progressive	
Ane, Brian	Destiny New Zealand	
Barter, Richard	United Future New Zealand	
Blue, Jackie	National Party	elected from party list
Goff, Phil	Labour Party	Incumbent (re-elected)
Scott, Barry	Direct Democracy Party	
Wang, Kenneth	ACT New Zealand	List MP; not returned to Parliament

=== Napier ===
Name	Party	Notes
Creighton, Terry	Green Party	
Fairbrother, Russell	Labour Party	Incumbent (defeated); returned to parliament from party list
Mist, James	New Zealand First	
Sinnott, Stephen	Destiny New Zealand	
Tremain, Chris	National Party	winner
Turner, Graham	United Future New Zealand	

=== Nelson ===
Name	Party	Notes
Barber, Nick	Christian Heritage NZ	
Fitzsimon, Anne	Māori Party	
Heine, Mike	ACT New Zealand	
McAlpine, Jacqueline	Jim Anderton's Progressive	
McCutcheon, Jen	Labour Party	
Newey, Rex	Direct Democracy Party	
Smith, Nick	National Party	Incumbent (re-elected)
Thomson, Jason	Destiny New Zealand	
Ward, Mike	Green Party	List MP; not returned to Parliament
Wells, Dennis	United Future New Zealand	

=== New Lynn ===
Name	Party	Notes
Burch, Gary	Direct Democracy Party	
Cunliffe, David	Labour Party	Incumbent (re-elected)
Drake, Anne	United Future New Zealand	
Green, Richard	Green Party	
Harris, Mita	National Party	
Kazemi Yazdi, Mohammad	Jim Anderton's Progressive	
Penney, Karen	Destiny New Zealand	
Steinijans, Barbara	ACT New Zealand	

=== New Plymouth ===
Name	Party	Notes
Brown, Sarah	Green Party	
Collier, Matt	United Future New Zealand	
Duynhoven, Harry	Labour Party	Incumbent (re-elected)
Irving, Moira	National Party	
Kane, Rusty	Independent	
O'Connor, Kerry	ACT New Zealand	
Roberts, Kerin	Destiny New Zealand	
Ruakere, Tony	Māori Party	
Smith, Kevin	Direct Democracy Party	
Webber, Mike	Libertarianz	

=== North Shore ===
Name	Party	Notes
Gillon, Paula	Jim Anderton's Progressive	
Harrison, Raewyn	Māori Party	
Kearney, Nick	ACT New Zealand	
Mapp, Wayne	National Party	Incumbent (re-elected)
Murphy, Michael	Libertarianz	
Tizard, Ross	United Future New Zealand	
Twyford, Phil	Labour Party	

=== Northcote ===
Name	Party	Notes
Coleman, Jonathan	National Party	winner
Dawson, Dianne	ACT New Zealand	
Gillon, Grant	Jim Anderton's Progressive	Former MP
Hartley, Ann	Labour Party	Incumbent (defeated); returned off Party list
Heslop, Nigel	Destiny New Zealand	
Linton, Peter	Libertarianz	
Manning, Trevor	New Zealand First	
Stone, Beth	United Future New Zealand	
Waaka, Frances	Māori Party	

=== Northland ===
Name	Party	Notes
Bradford, Sue	Green Party	List MP; returned off party list
Carter, John	National Party	Incumbent (re-elected)
Isaachsen, David	Destiny New Zealand	
Johnson, Phil	United Future New Zealand	
Jones, Shane	Labour Party	elected from party list
McClelland, Tom	ACT New Zealand	
Peri, Malcolm	Māori Party	
Peters, Jim	New Zealand First	List MP; not re-elected
Pistorius, Julian	Libertarianz	
Whaanga, Mel	Direct Democracy Party	

=== Ohariu-Belmont ===
Name	Party	Notes
Chauvel, Charles	Labour Party	entered house after resignation of Jim Sutton in 2006
Cross, Colin	Libertarianz	
Dunne, Peter	United Future New Zealand	Incumbent (re-elected), Party Leader
Manu, Tim	New Zealand First	
Roy, Heather	ACT New Zealand	List MP; elected off party list
Sandys, Elspeth	Jim Anderton's Progressive	
Sapsford, Roland	Green Party	
Shanks, Katrina	National Party	entered house upon resignation of Don Brash in 2006

=== Otago ===
Name	Party	Notes
Dean, Jacqui	National Party	winner
Eckhoff, Gerry	ACT New Zealand	List MP; not re-elected
Guy, Simon	Direct Democracy Party	
Parker, David	Labour Party	Incumbent (defeated); elected off party list
Pearce, Jane	Green Party	
Prosser, Richard	Democrats For Social Credit	
Silcock, Barry	Jim Anderton's Progressive	
Telford, Gerald	United Future New Zealand	

=== Otaki ===
Name	Party	Notes
Atack, Robert	Direct Democracy Party	
Brown, Diane	United Future New Zealand	
Ewing-Jarvie, Simon	ACT New Zealand	
Fisher, Nick	Green Party	
Franklin, Russell	Jim Anderton's Progressive	
Guy, Nathan	National Party	elected off party list
Hughes, Darren	Labour Party	Incumbent (re-elected)
Jeune, Margaret	Alliance	
Orzecki, Richard	Māori Party	
Perry, Chris	New Zealand First	

=== Pakuranga ===
Name	Party	Notes
Baron, Steve	Independent	
Jacobsen, Bronny	ACT New Zealand	
Jesze, David	Destiny New Zealand	
Ly, Meng	Jim Anderton's Progressive	
McInnes, Ian	United Future New Zealand	
McQueen, Ewen	Christian Heritage NZ	Party Leader
Moore, Kevin	Direct Democracy Party	
Paraone, Pita	New Zealand First	List MP; elected off party list
Williamson, Maurice	National Party	Incumbent (re-elected)
Wood, Michael	Labour Party	

=== Palmerston North ===
Name	Party	Notes
Chatha, Arshad	Independent	
Maharey, Steve	Labour Party	Incumbent (re-elected)
O'Halloran, Lawrence	Green Party	
Odering, Graham	New Zealand First	
Patchett, Dawn	Jim Anderton's Progressive	
Pederson, Garry	United Future New Zealand	
Plimmer, Malcolm	National Party	

=== Piako ===
Name	Party	Notes
Awa, Hori	Māori Party	
Davies, Mark	ACT New Zealand	
Donald, Ian	Jim Anderton's Progressive	
Lee, Stephen	Green Party	
Moroney, Sue	Labour Party	elected off party list
Ranby, Colin	Destiny New Zealand	
Seddon, Martyn	United Future New Zealand	
Stewart, Barbara	New Zealand First	List MP; elected off party list
Tisch, Lindsay	National Party	Incumbent (re-elected)

=== Port Waikato ===
Name	Party	Notes
Daw, Bob	New Zealand First	
Hart, Steven	The Republic Of New Zealand Party	
Hutchison, Paul	National Party	Incumbent (re-elected)
Keven, Rod	Destiny New Zealand	
Olsen, David	ACT New Zealand	
Panirau, Max	Jim Anderton's Progressive	
Peita, Josie	Māori Party	
Prasad, Jayati	United Future New Zealand	
Stratton, Craig	Direct Democracy Party	
Wall, Louisa	Labour Party	entered house in 2008 after retirement of Ann Hartley

=== Rakaia ===
Name	Party	Notes
Barr, Graeme	United Future New Zealand	
Connell, Brian	National Party	Incumbent (re-elected)
Davidson, Brian	ACT New Zealand	
Main, Philippa	Jim Anderton's Progressive	
Mathers, Mojo	Green Party	
Milne, Tony	Labour Party	

=== Rangitikei ===
Name	Party	Notes
Brown, Marilyn	Labour Party	
Hepi, Abe	Māori Party	
Moodie, Rob	United Future New Zealand	
Peirce, Richard	Rangitikei First	
Power, Simon	National Party	Incumbent (re-elected)
Strawbridge, Murray	New Zealand First	
Waugh, John	ACT New Zealand	

=== Rimutaka ===
Name	Party	Notes
Fowler, David	New Zealand First	
Kearney, Nigel	ACT New Zealand	
Leddy, Mike	National Party	
McClelland, Bernard	United Future New Zealand	
Morris, Michael	Green Party	
Reynolds, Dave	Independent	
Swain, Paul	Labour Party	Incumbent (re-elected)

=== Rodney ===
Name	Party	Notes
Brown, Chris	ACT New Zealand	
Dick, Adell	Māori Party	
Dunlop, Tony	Labour Party	
Evans, Graham	Green Party	
McNair, Craig	New Zealand First	List MP; not re-elected
Mountain, Peter	United Future New Zealand	
Punter, Colin	Direct Democracy Party	
Sharrock, Tony	Jim Anderton's Progressive	
Smith, Lockwood	National Party	Incumbent (re-elected)

=== Rongotai ===
Name	Party	Notes
Bell, Vladimir	Jim Anderton's Progressive	
Brooks, Jocelyn	Alliance	
Copeland, Gordon	United Future New Zealand	List MP; elected off party list
Highfield, Luci	Green Party	
King, Annette	Labour Party	Incumbent (re-elected)
Love, Morris	Māori Party	
Middleton, Gavin	ACT New Zealand	
Young, Nicola	National Party	

=== Rotorua ===
Name	Party	Notes
Chadwick, Stephanie	Labour Party	Incumbent (re-elected)
Herbert, Elaine	Destiny New Zealand	
Judd, Russell	United Future New Zealand	
Peterson, Carl	ACT New Zealand	
Saville, Raewyn	Green Party	
Stehbens, Gilbert	National Party	
Tabuteau, Fletcher	New Zealand First	

=== Tamaki ===
Incumbent Clem Simich is standing down to contest Mangere

Name	Party	Notes
Boyle, Leila	Labour Party	
Burch, Grant	Direct Democracy Party	
Graydon, Greg	United Future New Zealand	
Peachey, Allan	National Party	winner
Robson, Matt	Jim Anderton's Progressive	List MP; not re-elected
Shirley, Ken	ACT New Zealand	List MP; not re-elected
Webster, Brett	New Zealand First	

=== Taranaki-King Country ===
Name	Party	Notes
Ardern, Shane	National Party	Incumbent (re-elected)
Copeland, Anne	United Future New Zealand	
Harrison, Tony	Destiny New Zealand	
Jones, Mark	Christian Heritage NZ	
Smith, Bill	Jim Anderton's Progressive	
Steele, Richard	ACT New Zealand	
Street, Maryan	Labour Party	elected off party list

=== Taupo ===
Name	Party	Notes
Burton, Mark	Labour Party	Incumbent (re-elected)
Campbell Smith, Kristin	New Zealand First	
Check, Paul	United Future New Zealand	
Davis, John	Green Party	
Jollands, Andrew	ACT New Zealand	
Kirton, Weston	National Party	
Maea, Billy	Māori Party	
Potroz, Debbie	The Republic Of New Zealand Party	
Reeks, David	Jim Anderton's Progressive	
Te Kowhai, Charles	Destiny New Zealand	

=== Tauranga ===
Name	Party	Notes
Baldock, Larry	United Future New Zealand	List MP; not returned to Parliament
Barrett, Sally	Labour Party	
Clarkson, Bob	National Party	winner
Denz, Frances	ACT New Zealand	
Jensen, Neils	Destiny New Zealand	
Lall, Karandeep Singh	Jim Anderton's Progressive	
Peters, Winston	New Zealand First	Incumbent (defeated), Party Leader; elected off party list
Peterson, Noel	Green Party	
Ransom, Katherine	Democrats For Social Credit	
Watkins, Russell	Libertarianz	

=== Te Atatu ===
Name	Party	Notes
Browne-Knowles, Stella	New Zealand Family Rights Protection Party	
Carter, Chris	Labour Party	Incumbent (re-elected)
Davis, Moetu	New Zealand First	
Dewar, Kath	Green Party	
Haycock, Bruce	ACT New Zealand	
Henare, Tau	National Party	Former New Zealand First MP; elected off party list
Hughes, Adele	Equal Values	
Jenkins, Betty	Christian Heritage NZ	
Kotoisuva, John	Destiny New Zealand	
Martin, Kelvin	Māori Party	
Roy, Pavitra	Jim Anderton's Progressive	
Trichon, Gregory	Direct Democracy Party	
van Kempen, Jo	United Future New Zealand	
van Ruyssevelt, Bob	Alliance	

=== Tukituki ===
Name	Party	Notes
Barker, Rick	Labour Party	Incumbent (defeated); elected off party list
Burch, Scott	Direct Democracy Party	
Earth, Liz	Green Party	
Foss, Craig	National Party	winner
Ormond, John	ACT New Zealand	
Smith, Jocelyn	United Future New Zealand	
Tomoana, Ngahiwi	Māori Party	

=== Waimakariri ===
Name	Party	Notes
Britnell, Michael	Aotearoa Legalise Cannabis Party	
Cosgrove, Clayton	Labour Party	Incumbent (re-elected)
Holdaway, Rebekah	ACT New Zealand	
Liefting, Alan	Green Party	
Mark, Ron	New Zealand First	List MP; elected off party list
Orme, Jason	Direct Democracy Party	
Pickering, John	United Future New Zealand	
Wilkinson, Kate	National Party	List MP; elected off party list
Wright, John	Jim Anderton's Progressive	Former MP

=== Wairarapa ===
Incumbent Labour MP Georgina Beyer stood as a list only candidate in 2005

Name	Party	Notes
Bleakley, Claire	Green Party	
Hayes, John	National Party	winner
MacKenzie, Denise	Labour Party	
Perry, Edwin	New Zealand First	List MP; not returned to Parliament
Reeves, Graeme	United Future New Zealand	
Tulloch, Graeme	ACT New Zealand	
Walker, Cissie	Māori Party	

=== Waitakere ===
Name	Party	Notes
Baral, Hannah	United Future New Zealand	
Bennett, Paula	National Party	elected off party list
Clendon, David	Green Party	
Covich, Alona	Direct Democracy Party	
Ethel, Sandra	Alliance	
Green, Stan	Destiny New Zealand	
Joe, Charles	Māori Party	
Parkyn, David	Jim Anderton's Progressive	
Pillay, Lynne	Labour Party	Incumbent (re-elected)
Riddell, John	ACT New Zealand	
Stewart, Brendan	New Zealand First	
Ulberg, John	New Zealand Family Rights Protection Party	

=== Wellington Central ===
Name	Party	Notes
Appleby, Michael	Aotearoa Legalise Cannabis Party	Party Leader
Blumsky, Mark	National Party	elected off party list
Darnton, Bernard	Libertarianz	Party Leader
Franks, Stephen	ACT New Zealand	List MP; not returned to Parliament
Hay, Stephen	Anti-Capitalist Alliance	
Hobbs, Marian	Labour Party	Incumbent (re-elected)
Kedgley, Sue	Green Party	List MP; returned off party list
McKenzie, Fiona	United Future New Zealand	
O'Connell, Kane	Alliance	
Somerset, David	Jim Anderton's Progressive	

=== West Coast-Tasman ===
Name	Party	Notes
Auchinvole, Chris	National Party	elected off party list
Blight, Derek	Christian Heritage NZ	
Davies, Richard	Green Party	
Gill, Kevin	ACT New Zealand	
Holland, Lew	Jim Anderton's Progressive	
O'Connor, Damien	Labour Party	Incumbent (re-elected)
Osborne, Milton	United Future New Zealand - Outdoor Rec	
Wilkinson, Steve	Aotearoa Legalise Cannabis Party	

=== Whanganui ===
Name	Party	Notes
Ball, David	United Future New Zealand	
Borrows, Chester	National Party	winner
Brougham, Ian	Onenz Party	
Lucas, Debbie	Jim Anderton's Progressive	
Makutu, Aaron	Māori Party	
Milnes, John	Green Party	
Murchie, Malcolm	Democrats For Social Credit	
Pettis, Jill	Labour Party	Incumbent (defeated); returned off party list

=== Whangarei ===
Name	Party	Notes
Armstrong, Moea	Green Party	
Chalmers, Paul	Labour Party	
Donnelly, Brian	New Zealand First	List MP; returned from party list
Ford, Tony	Destiny New Zealand	
Heatley, Phil	National Party	Incumbent (re-elected)
Hughes, Helen	Libertarianz	
Hunt, Craig	United Future New Zealand	
Newman, Muriel	ACT New Zealand	deputy leader; List MP; not returned
Shepherd, Viv	Jim Anderton's Progressive	
Tawhiao, Rangi Ngati Huna	Māori Party	

=== Wigram ===
Name	Party	Notes
Anderton, Jim	Jim Anderton's Progressive	Incumbent (re-elected), Party Leader
Dowie, Tom	Alliance	
Emile, Tetauru	ACT New Zealand	
Foljambe, Anton	Direct Democracy Party	
Hansen, Michael	Economic Euthenics	
Kingi, Sam	Anti-Capitalist Alliance	
Lomax, Allison	National Party	
Mora, Mike	Labour Party	
Roberts, Vanessa	United Future New Zealand	
Roswell, Brian	New Zealand First	
Suggate, Richard	Green Party	

== Māori electorates ==
=== Ikaroa-Rawhiti ===
Name	Party	Notes
Horomia, Parekura	Labour Party	Incumbent (re-elected)
Poananga, Atareta	Māori Party	
Te Kani, Tauha	Destiny New Zealand	

=== Tainui ===
Name	Party	Notes
Greensill, Angeline	Māori Party	
Mahuta, Nanaia	Labour Party	Incumbent (re-elected)
Pope, Andrew	Independent	
Solomon, Hadyn	Destiny New Zealand	

=== Tamaki Makaurau ===
Name	Party	Notes
Hemahema-Tamati, Tauwehe	Destiny New Zealand	
Opai, Eugene	Direct Democracy Party	
Rerekura, Sam	Independent	
Sharples, Pita	Māori Party	Party Co-Leader, winner
Tamihere, John	Labour Party	Incumbent (defeated)

=== Te Tai Hauauru ===
Name	Party	Notes
Mason, Errol	Labour Party	
Te Wano, Hemi	Destiny New Zealand	
Turia, Tariana	Māori Party	Incumbent (winner), Party Co-Leader

=== Te Tai Tokerau ===
Name	Party	Notes
Daniels, Judy	Aotearoa Legalise Cannabis Party	
Harawira, Hone	Māori Party	winner
Mangu, Mere	Independent	
Maxwell, Hana	Independent	
Morton, Ernest	Destiny New Zealand	
Samuels, Dover	Labour Party	Incumbent (defeated); elected off party list

=== Te Tai Tonga ===
Name	Party	Notes
Caldwell, Russell	Jim Anderton's Progressive	
Ohia, Monte	Māori Party	
Okeroa, Mahara	Labour Party	Incumbent (re-elected)
Samuel, Maru	Destiny New Zealand	
Turei, Metiria	Green Party	List MP; elected off party list

=== Waiariki ===
Name	Party	Notes
Flavell, Te Ururoa	Māori Party	winner
Ririnui, Mita	Labour Party	Incumbent (defeated); elected off party list
Vercoe, Hawea	Destiny New Zealand	
