= Candidates in the 2002 New Zealand general election by electorate =

New Zealand political candidates in the MMP era
Year	Party list	Candidates
1996	party lists	by electorate
1999	party lists	by electorate
2002	party lists	by electorate
2005	party lists	by electorate
2008	party lists	by electorate
2011	party lists	by electorate
2014	party lists	by electorate
2017	party lists	by electorate
2020	party lists	by electorate
2023	party lists	by electorate
2026	party lists	by electorate

69 electorate members of the New Zealand House of Representatives were to be elected in the general election on 27 July 2002. The tables below show the candidates for each electorate. Incumbent electorate MPs are highlighted in blue, and those candidates who were members of the previous parliament via their party list—regardless of which electorate they previously contested—are highlighted in red.

Where candidates were listed on their party's list, this is shown accordingly. There are a number of cases why candidates don't have a list ranking:

- Some candidates belong to a registered party, but they were not on their party's list – this is shown on "none".
- Some candidates belong to a registered party, but the party did not submit a party list – the list field is blank in this case.
- Some candidates belong to an unregistered party, and those cannot submit a party list – the list field is blank in this case.

At the 2002 general election Libertarianz was the only registered party that did not submit a list.

== General electorates ==
=== Aoraki ===
2002 general election: Aoraki
Notes:	Blue background denotes an incumbent. Pink background denotes a current list MP. Yellow background denotes a retiring MP.			
Party	Candidate	Notes	List #	Source
Alliance	Andrew Buchanan		none	
United Future	Tony Bunting		46	
National	Wayne Marriott	Contested electorate in 1999	40	
Legalise Cannabis	Christine Mitchell	Contested electorate in 1999	5	
ACT	Kevin Murray		none	
Green	David Musgrave	Contested electorate in 1999	23	
Progressive	Lynley Simmons	Contested electorate for Alliance in 1999	54	
Christian Heritage	McGregor Simpson	Contested electorate in 1999	15	
Labour	Jim Sutton		8	

=== Auckland Central ===
2002 general election: Auckland Central
Notes:	Blue background denotes an incumbent. Pink background denotes a current list MP. Yellow background denotes a retiring MP.			
Party	Candidate	Notes	List #	Source
ACT	Lech Beltowski	Contested Manurewa in 1999	21	
Independent	Neil Head			
Christian Heritage	Sean Michael Reynolds		none	
Progressive	Vivenne Shepherd		18	
Green	Nándor Tánczos	Contested electorate in 1999	4	
United Future	Steve Taylor		30	
Labour	Judith Tizard		21	
Alliance	Mike Treen	Contested Waitakere in 1999	9	
Human Rights Party	Anthony van den Heuvel			
National	Pansy Wong		10	

=== Banks Peninsula ===
2002 general election: Banks Peninsula
Notes:	Blue background denotes an incumbent. Pink background denotes a current list MP. Yellow background denotes a retiring MP.			
Party	Candidate	Notes	List #	Source
Christian Heritage	Gerald Barker		6	
National	David Carter	Represented electorate, 1996–99; contested in 1999	4	
Progressive	Phil Clearwater		11	
Green	Rod Donald	Contested electorate in 1999	2	
Labour	Ruth Dyson		22	
ACT	Paul King	Contested electorate in 1999	11	
Alliance	Val McClimont		32	
United Future	Stephanie McEwin		50	

=== Bay of Plenty ===
2002 general election: Bay of Plenty
Notes:	Blue background denotes an incumbent. Pink background denotes a current list MP. Yellow background denotes a retiring MP.			
Party	Candidate	Notes	List #	Source
NZ First	Peter Brown	Contested electorate in 1999	2	
United Future	John Cassidy		none	
Christian Heritage	Dick Holland	Contested Auckland Central in 1999	4	
Progressive	John Neill	Contested electorate for Alliance in 1999	46	
National	Tony Ryall		8	
ACT	Graham Douglas Steenson		53	
Labour	Mei Taare		none	
Green	Te Ruruanga Te Keeti		25	

=== Christchurch Central ===
2002 general election: Christchurch Central
Notes:	Blue background denotes an incumbent. Pink background denotes a current list MP. Yellow background denotes a retiring MP.			
Party	Candidate	Notes	List #	Source
Communist League	Baskaran Appu			
Labour	Tim Barnett		none	
Progressive	Fleur Churton		27	
Alliance	Liz Gordon	Contested electorate in 1999	4	
Green	Matt Morris		59	
Christian Heritage	Vic Pollard		3	
United Future	Stephen Russell		36	
Legalise Cannabis	Jeanette Saxby	Contested West Coast-Tasman in 1999	6	
National	Nicky Wagner		37	
ACT	Anthony Watson		56	

=== Christchurch East ===
2002 general election: Christchurch East
Notes:	Blue background denotes an incumbent. Pink background denotes a current list MP. Yellow background denotes a retiring MP.			
Party	Candidate	Notes	List #	Source
Legalise Cannabis	Michael Britnell	Contested electorate in 1999	2	
Progressive	David Culverhouse		28	
Labour	Lianne Dalziel		14	
United Future	Paul Duxbury		36	
Anti-Capitalist Alliance	Philip Ferguson			
National	Stephen Johnston		none	
Green	Mary McCammon		56	
ACT	John Peters	Contested Te Tai Tonga in 1999	32	
Christian Heritage	Judy Phillips	Contested electorate in 1999	none	
Alliance	Colin Pounder		none	

=== Clevedon ===
2002 general election: Clevedon
Notes:	Blue background denotes an incumbent. Pink background denotes a current list MP. Yellow background denotes a retiring MP.			
Party	Candidate	Notes	List #	Source
Independent	Glenn Archibald			
Christian Heritage	David Arvidson		none	
NZ First	Brent Catchpole	Contested Epsom in 1999	13	
National	Judith Collins		48	
Alliance	Nick Corlett		none	
Green	Sue Cowie		none	
Labour	Dave Hereora		38	
ACT	John Thompson	Contested Hunua in 1999	20	
Progressive	Arthur Toms		56	
Retiring incumbents and withdrawn candidates
National	Warren Kyd	Lost selection to Judith Collins		

=== Clutha-Southland ===
2002 general election: Clutha-Southland
Notes:	Blue background denotes an incumbent. Pink background denotes a current list MP. Yellow background denotes a retiring MP.			
Party	Candidate	Notes	List #	Source
Green	Dayle Belcher		20	
Christian Heritage	Grant Bradfield	Contested electorate in 1999	14	
National	Bill English		1	
Alliance	Jim Flynn	Contested Dunedin North in 1996	none	
ACT	Roly Henderson		none	
United Future	Joy Lietze		54	
NZ First	Dave Mackie	Contested electorate in 1999	20	
Labour	Lesley Soper	Contested electorate in 1999	42	
Independent	David Webber	Contested electorate in 1999		
Progressive	Roger White	Contested electorate for Alliance in 1999	60	

=== Coromandel ===
2002 general election: Coromandel
Notes:	Blue background denotes an incumbent. Pink background denotes a current list MP. Yellow background denotes a retiring MP.			
Party	Candidate	Notes	List #	Source
Progressive	Annette Anderson		21	
Green	Jeanette Fitzsimons		1	
National	Sandra Goudie		42	
ACT	David Olsen		17	
Labour	Max Purnell		44	
United Future	Lee Robertson		38	

=== Dunedin North ===
2002 general election: Dunedin North
Notes:	Blue background denotes an incumbent. Pink background denotes a current list MP. Yellow background denotes a retiring MP.			
Party	Candidate	Notes	List #	Source
Green	Pip Direen	Contested Otago in 1999	39	
Labour	Pete Hodgson		13	
Progressive	Frede Jorgenson		36	
ACT	Willie Martin	Contested Dunedin South in 1999	18	
Legalise Cannabis	Paul John McMullan	Contested electorate in 1999	7	
Alliance	Carolyn Payne-Harker		18	
Christian Heritage	Glenn Peoples		none	
National	Katherine Rich	Contested electorate in 1999	14	
United Future	Todd Whitcombe		53	

=== Dunedin South ===
2002 general election: Dunedin South
Notes:	Blue background denotes an incumbent. Pink background denotes a current list MP. Yellow background denotes a retiring MP.			
Party	Candidate	Notes	List #	Source
Christian Heritage	Graham Bruce Aldridge		none	
Labour	David Benson-Pope		36	
Green	Fliss Butcher		30	
ACT	Matthew Cain Dwyer		none	
Progressive	Russell Edwards		32	
National	Paul Foster-Bell		56	
United Future	Jesse O'Brien		58	
Alliance	Justin Wilson		42	

=== East Coast ===
2002 general election: East Coast
Notes:	Blue background denotes an incumbent. Pink background denotes a current list MP. Yellow background denotes a retiring MP.			
Party	Candidate	Notes	List #	Source
Green	Catherine Delahunty		10	
National	Leanne Jensen-Daines		38	
Labour	Janet Mackey		none	
Alliance	Gavin Maclean	Contested electorate in 1999	17	
One NZ	David Moat		6	
ACT	Ian Swan	Contested electorate in 1999	54	
United Future	Judy Turner	Contested Bay of Plenty for Future NZ in 1999	8	

=== East Coast Bays ===
2002 general election: East Coast Bays
Notes:	Blue background denotes an incumbent. Pink background denotes a current list MP. Yellow background denotes a retiring MP.			
Party	Candidate	Notes	List #	Source
United Future	Paul Adams		9	
Christian Heritage	Ian Cummings		13	
Green	Jeanette Elley		42	
Progressive	Jill Henry	Contested North Shore for Alliance in 1999	10	
Labour	Hamish McCracken	Contested Albany in 1999	52	
One NZ	Alan McCulloch		3	
National	Murray McCully		none	
Alliance	Fiona McLaren		38	
ACT	Julie Pepper		47	

=== Epsom ===
2002 general election: Epsom
Notes:	Blue background denotes an incumbent. Pink background denotes a current list MP. Yellow background denotes a retiring MP.			
Party	Candidate	Notes	List #	Source
Alliance	Julie Fairey		16	
ACT	Rodney Hide	Contested electorate in 1999	2	
Green	Keith Locke		7	
Christian Heritage	Tony Molloy		none	
Labour	Di Nash		62	
United Future	Cindy Ruakere		22	
National	Richard Worth		25	

=== Hamilton East ===
2002 general election: Hamilton East
Notes:	Blue background denotes an incumbent. Pink background denotes a current list MP. Yellow background denotes a retiring MP.			
Party	Candidate	Notes	List #	Source
United Future	Richard Carter		34	
ACT	Brian George Dawson		38	
Christian Heritage	Gavin Denby	Contested electorate for ACT in 1999	11	
Alliance	Ravaani Ghaemmaghamy		24	
Progressive	Jim Medland		52	
Green	Cathy Olsen		16	
National	Tony Steel		none	
NZ First	Doug Woolerton	Contested electorate in 1999	5	
Labour	Dianne Yates	Represented electorate, 1993–96; contested in 1999	29	

=== Hamilton West ===
2002 general election: Hamilton West
Notes:	Blue background denotes an incumbent. Pink background denotes a current list MP. Yellow background denotes a retiring MP.			
Party	Candidate	Notes	List #	Source
Labour	Martin Gallagher		31	
Christian Heritage	Eleanor Goodall	Contested electorate in 1999	none	
NZ First	Bill Gudgeon	Contested Ikaroa-Rāwhiti in 1999	25	
ACT	Garry Mallett	Contested electorate in 1999	none	
Green	Chris Norton-Brown		60	
United Future	Martyn Seddon		26	
Progressive	Rob Shirley		53	
National	Bob Simcock	Represented electorate, 1996–99; contested in 1999	17	
Libertarianz	Timothy Denis Wikiriwhi			
Alliance	Craig Wills		46	

=== Helensville ===
2002 general election: Helensville
Notes:	Blue background denotes an incumbent. Pink background denotes a current list MP. Yellow background denotes a retiring MP.			
Party	Candidate	Notes	List #	Source
United Future	Andrea Deeth		21	
Progressive	Clare Dickson		30	
NZ First	Dail Jones	Represented previous version of electorate for National, 1978–84	10	
National	John Key		43	
Alliance	Helen Mackinlay		47	
Independent	Brian Neeson	Lost National selection to John Key		
Labour	Gary William Russell		none	
Christian Heritage	David Simpkin	Contested Manukau East in 1999	none	

=== Hutt South ===
2002 general election: Hutt South
Notes:	Blue background denotes an incumbent. Pink background denotes a current list MP. Yellow background denotes a retiring MP.			
Party	Candidate	Notes	List #	Source
Christian Heritage	Dennis John Bartlett		none	
Green	Perce Harpham		49	
Labour	Trevor Mallard		12	
ACT	Christopher Milne	Contested electorate in 1999	none	
United Future	Murray Smith		6	
Alliance	Anna Sutherland	Contested Rodney in 1999	27	
National	Richard Townley		none	
Progressive	Ross Weddell		59	

=== Ilam ===
2002 general election: Ilam
Notes:	Blue background denotes an incumbent. Pink background denotes a current list MP. Yellow background denotes a retiring MP.			
Party	Candidate	Notes	List #	Source
United Future	Marc Alexander		4	
Alliance	Lynda Boyd		none	
National	Gerry Brownlee		9	
Green	Lois Griffiths	Contested electorate for Alliance in 1999	48	
ACT	Nigel Mattison	Contested electorate in 1999	16	
Progressive	Bob Peck		51	
Christian Heritage	Gideon Pieters		none	
Labour	Richard Pole		59	

=== Invercargill ===
2002 general election: Invercargill
Notes:	Blue background denotes an incumbent. Pink background denotes a current list MP. Yellow background denotes a retiring MP.			
Party	Candidate	Notes	List #	Source
Green	Craig Carson	Contested electorate in 1999	435	
Christian Heritage	Mervyn Lemuel Clayton		none	
Progressive	Stephnie de Ruyter	Contested electorate for Alliance in 1999	22	
Alliance	Anna McMartin		26	
Labour	Mark Peck		28	
ACT	Peter Phiskie		48	
National	Eric Roy	Contested electorate in 1999	26	
United Future	Vince Smith		60	

=== Kaikoura ===
2002 general election: Kaikoura
Notes:	Blue background denotes an incumbent. Pink background denotes a current list MP. Yellow background denotes a retiring MP.			
Party	Candidate	Notes	List #	Source
Independent	Desmond Joseph Bell	Contested electorate in 1999		
Labour	Brendon Burns		48	
Green	Ian Ewen-Street	Contested electorate in 1999	6	
ACT	Ted Howard		42	
Progressive	Philippa Main		45	
Christian Heritage	Don Moore	Contested electorate in 1999	none	
National	Lynda Scott		12	
United Future	Julee Smith-Mischeski	Contested electorate for Future NZ in 1999	59	

=== Mana ===
2002 general election: Mana
Notes:	Blue background denotes an incumbent. Pink background denotes a current list MP. Yellow background denotes a retiring MP.			
Party	Candidate	Notes	List #	Source
United Future	Graham Butterworth	Contested electorate for United NZ in 1999	20	
ACT	Simon Antony Ewing-Jarvie		41	
Alliance	Michael Gilchrist		40	
Progressive	Doreen Henderson		38	
Anti-Capitalist Alliance	Paul Hopkinson			
Labour	Luamanuvao Winnie Laban		20	
Christian Heritage	Renton Maclachlan	Contested electorate in 1999	none	
Green	Olivia Mitchell		58	
One NZ	Janet White		4	
National	Sue Wood		19	
Retiring incumbents and withdrawn candidates
Labour	Graham Kelly	Contesting list only		

=== Māngere ===
2002 general election: Māngere
Notes:	Blue background denotes an incumbent. Pink background denotes a current list MP. Yellow background denotes a retiring MP.			
Party	Candidate	Notes	List #	Source
Green	Steve Abel	Contested Titirangi in 1999	26	
ACT	Juanita Angell		none	
Progressive	Rosie Brown		7	
Labour	Taito Phillip Field		none	
Christian Heritage	Steven Aotearoa Panapa	Contested electorate in 1999	none	
Alliance	Len Richards		23	
United Future	Bruce Settle		51	
National	Sylvia Taylor	Contested electorate in 1999	54	

=== Manukau East ===
2002 general election: Manukau East
Notes:	Blue background denotes an incumbent. Pink background denotes a current list MP. Yellow background denotes a retiring MP.			
Party	Candidate	Notes	List #	Source
National	Arthur Anae		28	
United Future	Kelly Chal		5	
Anti-Capitalist Alliance	Mark Muller			
Christian Heritage	Mary Mere Paki	Contested Maungakiekie in 1999	32	
Labour	Ross Robertson		none	
Progressive	Matt Robson	Contested Maungakiekie for Alliance in 1999	2	
Alliance	Simon Shields		45	
ACT	Gerald Trass		25	

=== Manurewa ===
2002 general election: Manurewa
Notes:	Blue background denotes an incumbent. Pink background denotes a current list MP. Yellow background denotes a retiring MP.			
Party	Candidate	Notes	List #	Source
National	Enosa Auva'a	Contested electorate in 1999	53	
Reform's Tahi Tangata Whenua	Dave Bergersen			
ACT	Bryce Bevin		27	
United Future	Peter Collins		52	
NZ First	John Geary		22	
Labour	George Hawkins		15	
Green	Alan Johnson		none	
Independent	Tommy Maroroa			
Progressive	Susi Pa'o Williams		9	
Alliance	Hayley Rawhiti		28	
Christian Heritage	Daniel W Willis		none	

=== Maungakiekie ===
2002 general election: Maungakiekie
Notes:	Blue background denotes an incumbent. Pink background denotes a current list MP. Yellow background denotes a retiring MP.			
Party	Candidate	Notes	List #	Source
Green	Don Fairley		43	
Labour	Mark Gosche		10	
United Future	Kevin Harper	Contested Ilam for Future NZ in 1999	16	
Progressive	Dawn Patchett		50	
Christian Heritage	Barry Pepperell	Contested Pakuranga in 1999	none	
Alliance	Joseph Randall		29	
ACT	Robin Roodt		50	
Communist League	Janet Roth			
National	Belinda Vernon	Represented electorate, 1996–99; contested in 1999	23	

=== Mount Albert ===
2002 general election: Mount Albert
Notes:	Blue background denotes an incumbent. Pink background denotes a current list MP. Yellow background denotes a retiring MP.			
Party	Candidate	Notes	List #	Source
National	Raewyn Bhana		59	
Green	Jon Carapiet	Contested Maungakiekie in 1999	13	
Labour	Helen Clark		1	
Christian Heritage	Pauline G Cooper		none	
Progressive	Gillian Dance		57	
United Future	Hassan Hosseini	Contested electorate for United NZ in 1999	14	
Alliance	Jill Ovens	Contested electorate in 1999	12	
Project Hope	Rick Stevenson			
Anti-Capitalist Alliance	Daphna Whitmore			
ACT	Bruce Williams		24	

=== Mount Roskill ===
2002 general election: Mount Roskill
Notes:	Blue background denotes an incumbent. Pink background denotes a current list MP. Yellow background denotes a retiring MP.			
Party	Candidate	Notes	List #	Source
Progressive	Trevor Barnard	Contested Pakuranga for Alliance in 1999	19	
Independent	Stephen Berry			
Labour	Phil Goff		6	
Alliance	Brendon Lane		36	
Christian Heritage	Ewen McQueen	Contested Epsom in 1999	none	
NZ First	Dawn Mullins	Contested Titirangi in 1999	15	
United Future	Bernie Ogilvy		14	
National	Brent Trewheela		58	
ACT	Kenneth Wang		10	

=== Napier ===
2002 general election: Napier
Notes:	Blue background denotes an incumbent. Pink background denotes a current list MP. Yellow background denotes a retiring MP.			
Party	Candidate	Notes	List #	Source
ACT	Donna Awatere Huata	Contested Auckland Central in 1999	5	
Christian Heritage	Colin Barr		none	
Alliance	Maxine Boag		21	
One NZ	John Bull		10	
Green	Terry Creighton	Contested Tukituki in 1999	36	
Labour	Russell Fairbrother		none	
National	Anne Tolley	Contested electorate in 1999	24	
United Future	Graham Turner		31	
Retiring incumbents and withdrawn candidates
Labour	Geoff Braybrooke			

=== Nelson ===
2002 general election: Nelson
Notes:	Blue background denotes an incumbent. Pink background denotes a current list MP. Yellow background denotes a retiring MP.			
Party	Candidate	Notes	List #	Source
Christian Heritage	Nick Barber	Contested electorate in 1999	10	
Progressive	Adrian Bayly		22	
Labour	John Kennedy		none	
Alliance	Mary O'Connor	Contested electorate in 1999	20	
National	Nick Smith		3	
Green	Mike Ward	Contested electorate in 1999	9	
United Future	Dennis Wells		61	

=== New Lynn ===
2002 general election: New Lynn
Notes:	Blue background denotes an incumbent. Pink background denotes a current list MP. Yellow background denotes a retiring MP.			
Party	Candidate	Notes	List #	Source
National	Brendan Beach		none	
Labour	David Cunliffe		37	
United Future	Susanne Fellner		24	
Alliance	Gerard Hehir	Contested Palmerston North in 1999	6	
Christian Heritage	Betty Jenkins		none	
Progressive	Doug McCallum		44	
Green	Saffron Toms		none	
ACT	Trevor West		59	

=== New Plymouth ===
2002 general election: New Plymouth
Notes:	Blue background denotes an incumbent. Pink background denotes a current list MP. Yellow background denotes a retiring MP.			
Party	Candidate	Notes	List #	Source
Green	Peter Berger		31	
Christian Heritage	Trevor Chadwick		none	
Labour	Harry Duynhoven		none	
National	Geoff Horton		61	
Progressive	Steven Charles Ihaia		35	
United Future	Tom Smithers	Contested electorate for Future NZ in 1999	27	
Libertarianz	Mike Webber			

=== North Shore ===
2002 general election: North Shore
Notes:	Blue background denotes an incumbent. Pink background denotes a current list MP. Yellow background denotes a retiring MP.			
Party	Candidate	Notes	List #	Source
Alliance	Karl Bartleet		43	
Progressive	Lyndsay Brock		24	
ACT	Deborah Coddington		6	
Labour	Helen Duncan	Contested electorate in 1999	30	
Green	Richard Green		46	
National	Wayne Mapp		7	
Christian Heritage	Mark Munroe	Contested Northcote in 1999	55	
NZ First	Barbara Stewart		6	
United Future	Ross Tizard		28	

=== Northcote ===
2002 general election: Northcote
Notes:	Blue background denotes an incumbent. Pink background denotes a current list MP. Yellow background denotes a retiring MP.			
Party	Candidate	Notes	List #	Source
United Future	Sharee Adams		37	
ACT	Dianne Dawson		39	
Progressive	Grant Gillon	Contested electorate for Alliance in 1999	3	
Labour	Ann Hartley		35	
Christian Heritage	Dirk Hoek			
Green	Rachel Mackintosh		55	
NZ First	John Riley		21	
National	Jeremy Sole		44	
Alliance	Solly Southwood		39	

=== Northland ===
2002 general election: Northland
Notes:	Blue background denotes an incumbent. Pink background denotes a current list MP. Yellow background denotes a retiring MP.			
Party	Candidate	Notes	List #	Source
National	John Carter		21	
Legalise Cannabis	Judy Daniels		8	
Alliance	John Timberjack Donoghue		none	
Christian Heritage	Ned Jack	Contested electorate in 1999	none	
Progressive	Peter David Kane		40	
Green	Janine McVeagh	Contested electorate in 1999	18	
United Future	Mike Mitcalfe	Contested electorate for Future NZ in 1999	49	
NZ First	Jim Peters		9	
Labour	Rachel Rose		none	
ACT	Smilie Wood		60	

=== Ohariu-Belmont ===
2002 general election: Ohariu-Belmont
Notes:	Blue background denotes an incumbent. Pink background denotes a current list MP. Yellow background denotes a retiring MP.			
Party	Candidate	Notes	List #	Source
Labour	Gill Boddy-Greer		46	
Green	Gareth Bodle		33	
United Future	Peter Dunne		1	
Progressive	Christine Kerr		41	
Alliance	Rebecca Matthews	Contested electorate in 1999	8	
Legalise Cannabis	Dave Moore	Contested Mana in 1999	4	
ACT	Heather Roy		9	
Christian Heritage	Chris Salt	Contested electorate in 1999	12	
National	Dale Stephens	Contested Ikaroa-Rāwhiti in 1999	46	

=== Otago ===
2002 general election: Otago
Notes:	Blue background denotes an incumbent. Pink background denotes a current list MP. Yellow background denotes a retiring MP.			
Party	Candidate	Notes	List #	Source
ACT	Gerry Eckhoff	Contested electorate in 1999	8	
Christian Heritage	Mike Ferguson	Contested electorate in 1999	18	
National	Gavan Herlihy		16	
Alliance	Sam Huggard		13	
Labour	David Parker		47	
United Future	Allan Smellie		57	
Progressive	Hessel Van Wieren		58	

=== Otaki ===
2002 general election: Otaki
Notes:	Blue background denotes an incumbent. Pink background denotes a current list MP. Yellow background denotes a retiring MP.			
Party	Candidate	Notes	List #	Source
Christian Heritage	Robin Corner	Contested electorate in 1999	none	
One NZ	Richard Fisher		5	
Progressive	Russell Franklin	Contested electorate for Alliance in 1999	20	
Green	Caroline Greig		47	
Labour	Darren Hughes		51	
Independent	Anne Hunt			
Alliance	Margaret Jeune		33	
Beneficiaries Party	David Keen Mitchell			
ACT	Ian Sage		51	
National	Roger Sowry	Contested electorate in 1999	2	
Retiring incumbents and withdrawn candidates
Labour	Judy Keall			

=== Pakuranga ===
2002 general election: Pakuranga
Notes:	Blue background denotes an incumbent. Pink background denotes a current list MP. Yellow background denotes a retiring MP.			
Party	Candidate	Notes	List #	Source
ACT	Andrew Jollands		26	
Christian Heritage	Jonathan Ko		36	
Progressive	Meng Ly		8	
United Future	Ian McInnes		19	
NZ First	Pita Paraone	Contested electorate in 1999	7	
Alliance	Paul Protheroe		41	
Green	David Rose	Contested electorate in 1999	63	
National	Maurice Williamson		none	
Labour	Michael Wood		none	

=== Palmerston North ===
2002 general election: Palmerston North
Notes:	Blue background denotes an incumbent. Pink background denotes a current list MP. Yellow background denotes a retiring MP.			
Party	Candidate	Notes	List #	Source
United Future	Grant Bowater	Contested electorate for Future NZ in 1999	29	
Independent	Arshad Chatha			
Christian Heritage	Vic Jarvis	Contested Rangitikei in 1999	5	
Labour	Steve Maharey		4	
Green	Margaret McKenzie		57	
National	Dave Scott		50	
Alliance	Peter Wheeler		31	
One NZ	Jim White		2	

=== Piako ===
2002 general election: Piako
Notes:	Blue background denotes an incumbent. Pink background denotes a current list MP. Yellow background denotes a retiring MP.			
Party	Candidate	Notes	List #	Source
United Future	Chris Bretton		23	
ACT	Andrew Davies	Contested Karapiro in 1999	14	
Alliance	Peter Jamieson	Contested Hamilton East in 1999	37	
Labour	Sue Moroney	Contested Karapiro in 1996	none	
Progressive	John Pemberton	Contested Karapiro for Alliance in 1999	8	
Christian Heritage	Colin Ranby		none	
NZ First	Gordon Stewart	Contested Karapiro in 1999	17	
National	Lindsay Tisch		none	

=== Port Waikato ===
2002 general election: Port Waikato
Notes:	Blue background denotes an incumbent. Pink background denotes a current list MP. Yellow background denotes a retiring MP.			
Party	Candidate	Notes	List #	Source
NZ First	Bob Daw		19	
United Future	Dave Fitness		32	
ACT	Mary Hackshaw		19	
Labour	Lesley Harry		54	
National	Paul Hutchison		27	
Progressive	Ram Parkash		48	
Christian Heritage	Alex Robinson		none	
Green	Jane Williams		65	

=== Rakaia ===
2002 general election: Rakaia
Notes:	Blue background denotes an incumbent. Pink background denotes a current list MP. Yellow background denotes a retiring MP.			
Party	Candidate	Notes	List #	Source
United Future	Graeme Barr		47	
Progressive	Christine Cheesman		26	
National	Brian Connell		none	
Labour	Tony Milne		none	
Green	Fraser Palmer-Hesketh		61	
Christian Heritage	Roger Payne		8	
ACT	Greg Sneddon		52	
Retiring incumbents and withdrawn candidates
National	Jenny Shipley			

=== Rangitikei ===
2002 general election: Rangitikei
Notes:	Blue background denotes an incumbent. Pink background denotes a current list MP. Yellow background denotes a retiring MP.			
Party	Candidate	Notes	List #	Source
Labour	Margaret Hayward		61	
United Future	Jim Howard	Contested electorate for United NZ in 1999	25	
Christian Heritage	Ruth Jarvis		9	
Alliance	Dion Martin	Contested electorate in 1999	34	
National	Simon Power		13	
Progressive	Heather Marion Smith		55	
ACT	John Waugh		57	

=== Rimutaka ===
2002 general election: Rimutaka
Notes:	Blue background denotes an incumbent. Pink background denotes a current list MP. Yellow background denotes a retiring MP.			
Party	Candidate	Notes	List #	Source
Progressive	Robert Bryan		25	
United Future	Wayne Chapman	Contested Ohariu-Belmont for Future NZ in 1999	10	
One NZ	Peter Grove		9	
ACT	Nigel Kearney		none	
Independent	Nick Kelly			
Alliance	Moira Lawler		22	
National	Mike Leddy		none	
Christian Heritage	Ken Munn		7	
Green	Russel Norman		17	
Labour	Paul Swain		18	

=== Rodney ===
2002 general election: Rodney
Notes:	Blue background denotes an incumbent. Pink background denotes a current list MP. Yellow background denotes a retiring MP.			
Party	Candidate	Notes	List #	Source
Christian Heritage	Kevin Bartlett		none	
Green	Sue Bradford	Contested electorate in 1999	3	
Labour	Grant Duffy		none	
Alliance	Paula Henderson		35	
United Future	Craig Hunt	Contested Waitakere for Future NZ in 1999	15	
Progressive	Martin Lawrence		43	
NZ First	Craig McNair		8	
National	Lockwood Smith		11	
ACT	Penny Webster	Contested electorate in 1999	13	

=== Rongotai ===
2002 general election: Rongotai
Notes:	Blue background denotes an incumbent. Pink background denotes a current list MP. Yellow background denotes a retiring MP.			
Party	Candidate	Notes	List #	Source
ACT	Carl Beentjes		36	
United Future	Gordon Copeland		2	
Progressive	Jamie Daly		29	
National	Glenda Hughes		49	
Labour	Annette King		7	
Independent	Robert Murray			
Christian Heritage	Simon Steenhof		none	
Alliance	Vernon Tile	Contested electorate in 1999	15	
Green	Celia Wade-Brown		15	

=== Rotorua ===
2002 general election: Rotorua
Notes:	Blue background denotes an incumbent. Pink background denotes a current list MP. Yellow background denotes a retiring MP.			
Party	Candidate	Notes	List #	Source
Labour	Steve Chadwick		34	
Progressive	David Espin		33	
United Future	Russell Judd		17	
Green	Richard Kake		none	
NZ Equal Rights Party	Cliff Lee	Contested electorate in 1999		
Alliance	Julie Poupard		none	
Christian Heritage	Ross Prichard	Contested electorate in 1999	none	
National	Malcolm Short		none	
NZ First	Fletcher Tabuteau		18	
Independent	Reg Turner	Contested Bay of Plenty for ACT in 1996		

=== Tamaki ===
2002 general election: Tamaki
Notes:	Blue background denotes an incumbent. Pink background denotes a current list MP. Yellow background denotes a retiring MP.			
Party	Candidate	Notes	List #	Source
Green	Hana Blackmore		32	
Labour	Leila Boyle		57	
Alliance	Cathy Casey	Contested Wairarapa in 1999	none	
Christian Heritage	Victor Cedric Grubi	Contested electorate in 1999	none	
Progressive	Nong Li		15	
United Future	Bruce McGrail	Contested electorate for Future NZ in 1999	13	
ACT	Ken Shirley	Contested Ohariu-Belmont in 1996	7	
National	Clem Simich		none	
NZ First	Brett Webster		16	

=== Taranaki-King Country ===
2002 general election: Taranaki-King Country
Notes:	Blue background denotes an incumbent. Pink background denotes a current list MP. Yellow background denotes a retiring MP.			
Party	Candidate	Notes	List #	Source
National	Shane Ardern		none	
Labour	Judy Hawkins		64	
Christian Heritage	Gavin Hockly	Contested Karapiro in 1999	none	
Green	Laurie Hoverd		51	
ACT	Owen Jennings	Contested electorate in 1999	12	
Independent	Rusty Kane	Contested New Plymouth for People's Choice in 1999		
Progressive	John Kilbride	Contested Karapiro for Alliance in 1996	42	
United Future	Rachel Smithers		39	

=== Taupo ===
2002 general election: Taupo
Notes:	Blue background denotes an incumbent. Pink background denotes a current list MP. Yellow background denotes a retiring MP.			
Party	Candidate	Notes	List #	Source
Progressive	Victor Bradley		23	
Labour	Mark Burton		16	
Green	Nick Fisher	Contested electorate in 1999	44	
United Future	Denis Gilmore		44	
Alliance	John Harré		none	
National	Weston Kirton		51	
ACT	Diane Mulcock		29	
Christian Heritage	Scott Wishart		56	

=== Tauranga ===
2002 general election: Tauranga
Notes:	Blue background denotes an incumbent. Pink background denotes a current list MP. Yellow background denotes a retiring MP.			
Party	Candidate	Notes	List #	Source
United Future	Larry Baldock	Contested electorate for Future NZ in 1999	7	
Christian Heritage	Margaret Canter-Leighton		none	
Green	Ian Douglas		40	
National	Tim Macindoe	Contested Karapiro for United NZ in 1996	39	
Progressive	Garry Oster		47	
NZ First	Winston Peters		1	
ACT	Ron Scott		28	
Libertarianz	Russell Watkins			
Labour	Margaret Wilson	Contested electorate in 1999	9	

=== Te Atatu ===
2002 general election: Te Atatu
Notes:	Blue background denotes an incumbent. Pink background denotes a current list MP. Yellow background denotes a retiring MP.			
Party	Candidate	Notes	List #	Source
Labour	Chris Carter		25	
United Future	Anne Drake	Contested Titirangi for Future NZ in 1999	18	
ACT	Ted Erskine-Legget		40	
Christian Heritage	Matthew Flannagan		19	
National	Tau Henare	NZ First/Mauri Pacific MP, 1993–99; contested Te Tai Tokerau for Mauri Pacific in 1999	35	
NZ First	Christine Ritchie		none	
Progressive	Pasene Tauialo-o-lilomaiava		14	
Alliance	Robert Van Ruyssevelt		48	
Independent	Helen Wiseman-Dare			

=== Tukituki ===
2002 general election: Tukituki
Notes:	Blue background denotes an incumbent. Pink background denotes a current list MP. Yellow background denotes a retiring MP.			
Party	Candidate	Notes	List #	Source
Labour	Rick Barker		24	
Christian Heritage	Margaret Burgess	Contested electorate in 1999	17	
National	Craig Foss		47	
ACT	John Ormond	Contested electorate in 1999	none	
One NZ	John Porter		1	
Progressive	Barry Pulford		61	
Alliance	Richard Wallis		44	
Green	Rich Wernham	Contested Rongotai in 1999	none	

=== Waimakariri ===
2002 general election: Waimakariri
Notes:	Blue background denotes an incumbent. Pink background denotes a current list MP. Yellow background denotes a retiring MP.			
Party	Candidate	Notes	List #	Source
ACT	Nicholas Cairney		23	
Labour	Clayton Cosgrove		none	
Green	Charles Drace	Contested electorate in 1999	none	
National	Dan Gordon		41	
NZ First	Ron Mark	Contested electorate in 1999	4	
Alliance	Paul Piesse	Contested Christchurch East in 1999	none	
United Future	Andrew Smith		45	
Christian Heritage	Stephen Williams	Contested electorate in 1999	none	
Progressive	John Wright	Contested electorate for Alliance in 1999	4	

=== Wairarapa ===
2002 general election: Wairarapa
Notes:	Blue background denotes an incumbent. Pink background denotes a current list MP. Yellow background denotes a retiring MP.			
Party	Candidate	Notes	List #	Source
Labour	Georgina Beyer		23	
National	Ian Buchanan		29	
Progressive	Bill Henderson		34	
ACT	Ian George Macfarlane		none	
Green	Sarah Millington		27	
United Future	Frank Owen	Contested Hutt South for United NZ in 1999	42	
NZ First	Edwin Perry	Contested Hutt South in 1999	11	
Christian Heritage	Merepeka Raukawa-Tait		2	
Alliance	Gerald Tait		none	

=== Waitakere ===
2002 general election: Waitakere
Notes:	Blue background denotes an incumbent. Pink background denotes a current list MP. Yellow background denotes a retiring MP.			
Party	Candidate	Notes	List #	Source
NZ First	Arthur Albert	Contested electorate in 1999	none	
Christian Heritage	Madeleine Jane Flannagan	Contested Hamilton East in 1999	20	
Alliance	Laila Harré	Contested Te Atatu in 1999	1	
National	Marie Hasler	Represented electorate, 1996–99; contested Titirangi in 1999	24	
Progressive	David Parkyn		49	
Labour	Lynne Pillay	Contested Tamaki in 1999	39	
ACT	John Riddell		49	
United Future	Graeme Torckler		43	
Green	Meriel Anne Watts		12	

=== Wellington Central ===
2002 general election: Wellington Central
Notes:	Blue background denotes an incumbent. Pink background denotes a current list MP. Yellow background denotes a retiring MP.			
Party	Candidate	Notes	List #	Source
Legalise Cannabis	Michael Appleby	Contested electorate in 1999	1	
Christian Heritage	Matthew Bartlett		none	
Libertarianz	Colin Cross			
ACT	Stephen Franks	Contested Rongotai in 1999	4	
NZ First	Rob Harris	Contested Wairarapa in 1999	14	
Labour	Marian Hobbs		17	
Green	Sue Kedgeley		5	
United Future	Rob Moodie		40	
National	Hekia Parata		15	
Alliance	Robert Reid		11	

=== West Coast-Tasman ===
2002 general election: West Coast-Tasman
Notes:	Blue background denotes an incumbent. Pink background denotes a current list MP. Yellow background denotes a retiring MP.			
Party	Candidate	Notes	List #	Source
Christian Heritage	Derek Blight	Contested electorate in 1999	none	
Green	Richard Davies	Contested electorate in 1999	14	
United Future	Gray Eatwell	Contested East Coast for NZ First in 1999	12	
Progressive	Bob Fox		31	
ACT	William Stuart Gardner		none	
Alliance	Dick Hitchens		none	
National	Barry Nicolle		55	
Labour	Damien O'Connor		none	
Aotearoa NZ Youth Independence Political Party	Robert Frank Terry			
Independent	Steven Wilkinson			

=== Whanganui ===
2002 general election: Whanganui
Notes:	Blue background denotes an incumbent. Pink background denotes a current list MP. Yellow background denotes a retiring MP.			
Party	Candidate	Notes	List #	Source
Christian Heritage	Desiree Boniface		none	
National	Chester Borrows	Contested electorate in 1999	36	
NZ Equal Rights Party	Ian Wallace Brougham			
United Future	Chris Collier		56	
Progressive	Bruce Parr		17	
Labour	Jill Pettis		27	
Green	Peter Russell		none	
Alliance	Kerry Wilson		none	

=== Whangarei ===
2002 general election: Whangarei
Notes:	Blue background denotes an incumbent. Pink background denotes a current list MP. Yellow background denotes a retiring MP.			
Party	Candidate	Notes	List #	Source
Alliance	Tricia Cutforth	Contested electorate in 1999	5	
NZ First	Brian Donnelly	Contested electorate in 1999	3	
Green	Calvin Green		28	
Christian Heritage	Rod Harris	Contested electorate in 1999	16	
National	Phil Heatley		31	
Libertarianz	Helen Hughes			
ACT	Muriel Newman	Contested electorate in 1999	3	
United Future	Gray Phillips	Contested electorate for United NZ in 1999	55	
Labour	David Shearer		45	
Progressive	David Angus Wilson	Contested Northland for Alliance in 1999	12	

=== Wigram ===
2002 general election: Wigram
Notes:	Blue background denotes an incumbent. Pink background denotes a current list MP. Yellow background denotes a retiring MP.			
Party	Candidate	Notes	List #	Source
PCP Coalition	BJ Anderson			
Progressive	Jim Anderton		1	
Green	Paul de Spa		38	
Christian Heritage	Stephen Dejong		none	
Alliance	Sean Gourley		30	
Economic Euthenics	Michael Hansen	Perennial candidate; contested electorate in 1999		
United Future	Andrew Kubala		55	
ACT	Shirley Marshall		30	
Labour	Mike Mora	Contested electorate in 1999	67	
National	Alec Neill		22	

== Māori electorates ==
=== Ikaroa-Rāwhiti ===
2002 general election: Ikaroa-Rāwhiti
Notes:	Blue background denotes an incumbent. Pink background denotes a current list MP. Yellow background denotes a retiring MP.			
Party	Candidate	Notes	List #	Source
National	Alan Delamere		63	
Christian Heritage	Wiremu Edwards Eruiti		none	
Labour	Parekura Horomia		5	
Progressive	Toni Jowsey		39	
Aroha Ngia Tatou	Te Aroha Jack Mei	Contested electorate in 1999		
Mana Māori	Glenis Philip-Barbara		3	
Nga Iwi Morehu Movement	Donna Louise Plumridge			
Alliance	John Tuwhakairiora Tibble		25	

=== Tainui ===
2002 general election: Tainui
Notes:	Blue background denotes an incumbent. Pink background denotes a current list MP. Yellow background denotes a retiring MP.			
Party	Candidate	Notes	List #	Source
National	Kevin J Davies		none	
United Future	Lee Edmonds	Contested Te Tai Hauāuru for Future NZ in 1999	35	
Mana Māori	Angeline Greensill	Contested Port Waikato in 1999	1	
Alliance	Willie Jackson	Contested Hauraki Maori in 1999	2	
Progressive	Te Pare Joseph	Contested Te Tai Hauāuru for Alliance in 1996	37	
Labour	Nanaia Mahuta		19	
MAI	Mikaire Tuheke Sutton			
Christian Heritage	Albert Vahaakolo		none	

=== Tamaki Makaurau ===
2002 general election: Tamaki Makaurau
Notes:	Blue background denotes an incumbent. Pink background denotes a current list MP. Yellow background denotes a retiring MP.			
Party	Candidate	Notes	List #	Source
National	George Ngatai	Contested Waiariki in 1999	45	
Alliance	Janice Panoho-Smith		14	
Labour	John Tamihere		none	
Green	Metiria Turei		8	
Christian Heritage	Tuhi Vahaakolo	Contested Hauraki Maori in 1999	none	
Progressive	Sue Elizabeth Wharewaka-Topia Watts		13	

=== Te Tai Hauāuru ===
2002 general election: Te Tai Hauāuru
Notes:	Blue background denotes an incumbent. Pink background denotes a current list MP. Yellow background denotes a retiring MP.			
Party	Candidate	Notes	List #	Source
United Future	James Hippolite		48	
Mana Māori	Ken Mair	Contested electorate in 1999	2	
Alliance	Kamaka Manuel		19	
Christian Heritage	Jeannette Shramka	Contested electorate in 1999	none	
Labour	Tariana Turia		none	
National	Greg White		30	

=== Te Tai Tokerau ===
2002 general election: Te Tai Tokerau
Notes:	Blue background denotes an incumbent. Pink background denotes a current list MP. Yellow background denotes a retiring MP.			
Party	Candidate	Notes	List #	Source
Progressive	Peter Campbell		6	
Quality of Life Political Movement	Ivan Erstich			
Alliance	Naida Glavish		10	
National	Mita Harris		none	
New Generation Party	Te Kaiarahi Hui	Contested electorate for Piri Wiri Tua in 1999		
Independent	Mere Mangu			
Christian Heritage	Mike Norman		none	
Labour	Dover Samuels		11	
Independent	Mike Smith			

=== Te Tai Tonga ===
2002 general election: Te Tai Tonga
Notes:	Blue background denotes an incumbent. Pink background denotes a current list MP. Yellow background denotes a retiring MP.			
Party	Candidate	Notes	List #	Source
Mana Māori	Jacqui Amohanga		5	
National	Bill Karaitiana		60	
Christian Heritage	Dee Morgan		none	
United Future	Witana Murray	Contested electorate for Future NZ in 1999	41	
Labour	Mahara Okeroa		33	
Nga Iwi Morehu Movement	Jennifer Wikitoria Waitai-Rapana			
Independent	Chris Webster			
Alliance	Vern Winitana	Contested electorate in 1999	7	

=== Waiariki ===
2002 general election: Waiariki
Notes:	Blue background denotes an incumbent. Pink background denotes a current list MP. Yellow background denotes a retiring MP.			
Party	Candidate	Notes	List #	Source
Christian Heritage	Rosemary Francis	Contested Banks Peninsula in 1999	none	
Alliance	Sharon Heta		none	
United Future	Huikakahu Brian Kawe		none	
National	Hamuera Mitchell		52	
Labour	Mita Ririnui		32	
Mana Māori	Rihi Vercoe		6	
