= WIN Party =

Political party in New Zealand

- Leader: John van Buren
- Founded: December 2004
- Dissolved: August 2006
- Ideology: Single-issue politics Opposition to anti-smoking laws
- Slogan: "Freedom of Choice"

The WIN Party was a small political party in New Zealand.

It was founded by a group of publicans and bar-owners who objected to the government's ban on smoking in bars and restaurants, introduced in December 2004. WIN's slogan was "Freedom of Choice", and the party said that it was fighting a growing trend in which "the average Kiwi ... is being told more and more what they can and can't do". According to the party's leaders, opposition to the smoking ban was the party's primary campaign plank, but other related issues were also given attention.

WIN's leader was John van Buren, a publican from the Banks Peninsula area. Geoff Mulvihill, a publican from Timaru, was the deputy leader. Both van Buren and Mulvihill have been accused by the Ministry of Health of not enforcing the smoking ban, as required by law. Mulvihill is known for supporting freedom of choice for his patrons, having once lost his liquor licence for operating around the clock prior to the legislation of 24-hour trading.

The party was registered on 13 May 2005, but chose not to field candidates in the 2005 elections. Instead, it endorsed the larger United Future party, and van Buren stood as a candidate on United Future's party list, where he was ranked 55th out of 57. As United Future received only three seats in Parliament at that election, van Buren was not elected.

The party published the results of a survey showing that while city bars had suffered little damage from the ban on patrons choosing to smoke, suburban and rural establishments had been hard hit.

WIN was deregistered in August 2006.

== See also ==
- Smoking in New Zealand
- Smokers' Rights Party
- List of political parties in New Zealand
