= Craig McNair =

New Zealand politician

Craig McNair (born 1975) is a former New Zealand politician. He was a New Zealand First member of parliament from 2002 to 2005.

== Early years ==
Before entering politics, McNair was a marketing manager. He also holds a pilot's licence.

== Member of Parliament ==
New Zealand Parliament
Years	Term	Electorate	List	Party
2002–2005	47th	List	8	NZ First

He was elected to Parliament as a list MP in the 2002 election, having been ranked in eighth place on the New Zealand First list. He was his party's youth affairs spokesman and was on the finance and expenditure select committee.

In 2002, McNair had a brief relationship with the parliamentary executive secretary for Labour MP Clayton Cosgrove, the secretary was sacked for a conflict of interest, but rehired in the office of the Minister of Conservation.

At the 2005 election he was ranked 11th on the party list. New Zealand First gained enough party votes to elect seven MPs, so McNair missed out on being returned as an MP. After being an MP he worked in real estate in Auckland.

In the 2008 election he stood for Waitakere and was ranked 17th on the New Zealand First list, but he did not win the electorate and the party did not make the threshold of five percent of votes to get any list candidates elected.
