= Paul Check =

New Zealand political candidate

Paul Ramon Check is a New Zealand political candidate. He is the leader of Outdoor Recreation New Zealand, a party based around the hunting and fishing lobbies.

Check initially worked as a marine engineer in the Royal New Zealand Navy, and then served in the United States Merchant Marine in Brazil. He later worked as an engineer in other parts of Latin America and in New Zealand. He currently manages a company in Taupō.

In the 2002 election, Check was third on Outdoor Recreation New Zealand's list, but the party did not win enough votes to enter Parliament. Later, the party affiliated itself with United Future, a larger party. In the 2005 election, Outdoor Recreation stood candidates under the United Future banner. Check, as the new leader of Outdoor Recreation, was placed seventh, the highest position for an Outdoor Recreation candidate. He contested the Taupō electorate and achieved 2.06% of the votes.
