= Roland Sapsford =

New Zealand politician

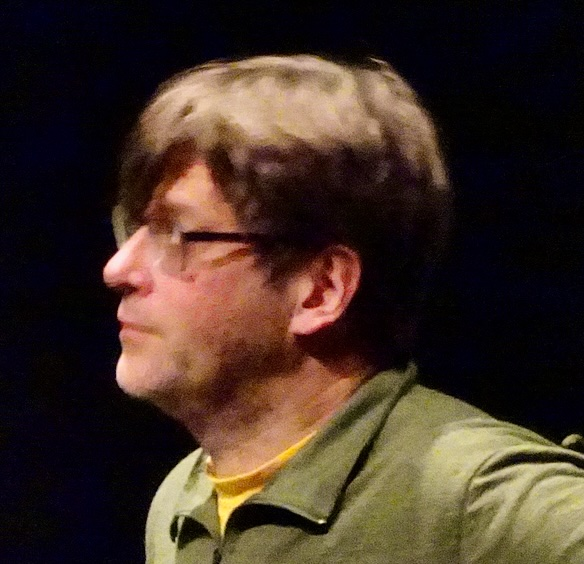

9th Green Party Male Co-convenor
- In office 2006–2012 Serving with Karen Davies (2006–2007); Moea Armstrong (2007–2010); Georgina Morrison (2010–2012)
- Preceded by: Paul de Spa
- Succeeded by: Pete Huggins

Personal details
- Party: Green Party of Aotearoa New Zealand

Roland Sapsford is a former male co-convenor (organisational president) of the Green Party of Aotearoa New Zealand. The female co-convenor in the latter part of his office was Georgina Morrison. Sapsford was elected co-convenor in a contested election at the Green Party AGM in 2006, at the same time as former male co-leader Russel Norman's election. He stood down in June 2012 after six years, during which the Party's finances and organisation were significantly enhanced.

Sapsford was a candidate for the Greens in the 2005 and 2002 General Elections and was their campaign co-manager in their first successful bid to enter the Parliament of New Zealand in 1999. Over the period 2000–2005 he worked for the Green Party in the New Zealand Parliament and was credited by the right-wing ACT New Zealand party as having a major influence over sustainable transport legislation enacted during that time. Prior to becoming campaign co-manager in 1999, Sapsford was the Green Party's national policy convenor from 1996–1999. He first joined the Green Party in 1993.

Outside of the Green Party, Sapsford has a long history of local activism; an early example being his efforts to form a secondary school students union in the early 1980s. During the 1990s he was spokesperson and convenor of Campaign for a Better City (CBC) which, from 1994 to 2004, led a prolonged and highly popular but ultimately unsuccessful campaign to halt the construction of a major road through the historic Te Aro area of Wellington City. He was active in the creation of the brief Heartbeat Wellington campaign in 2005, which successfully opposed the introduction of a V8 Streetcar race in Wellington, and Option3 in 2006, which advocated for sustainable transport solutions in the Wellington region. Sapsford was also co-chair of the Aro Valley Community Council for many years until 2008, when he retired from this role. He remains a Trustee of the Te Aro Heritage Trust.

Sapsford was the lead researcher for the Greens in Parliament on drug policy and produced a submission supporting the Party's policy on the normalisation of cannabis use.

Roland Sapsford lived in the Aro Valley, a suburb of Wellington City. In early 2022 he moved to Melbourne, Australia, to take up the CEO role at Australia's Climate and Health Alliance (CAHA), Australia's national peak body on climate change and health.

Party political offices
Preceded by Paul de Spa	Green Party Male Co-convenor; 2006 – 2012; Serving alongside: Karen Davies (2006–2007), Moea Armstrong (2007–2010), and Georgina Morrison (2010–2012)	Succeeded by Pete Huggins
