= Mama Tere Strickland =

New Zealand transgender woman

Mama Tere Strickland or Teremoananuiakiwa Strickland Tahere (15 July 1963 – 3 August 2012) was a transgender woman from Auckland, New Zealand. She was a youth worker, transgender advocate, former sex worker and a life member of the New Zealand AIDS Foundation.

== Life ==
Strickland was of Cook Islands Māori, Te Tai Tokerau heritage. She came from an abusive family and ran away from home in Ōtara at the age of 11 and began living on the streets of Auckland. She was a sex worker for 25 years before leaving the industry and co-founding Te Aronga Hou Inaianei (TAHI), an agency aimed at helping prostitutes leave the sex industry, being run through the Māngere East Family Service.

She was made a life member of the New Zealand AIDS Foundation in 2010 for her work to prevent HIV and AIDS and was a list candidate for the Māori Party in 2005. Māori Party co-leader Tariana Turia described her as a dedicated advocate for at-risk groups.

She died of a suspected heart attack on Friday, 3 August 2012, aged 49. A New Zealand AIDS Foundation spokesperson said Strickland was 'a mentor to many and a mother to all'.
