= Edwin Perry =

New Zealand politician (1948–2025)

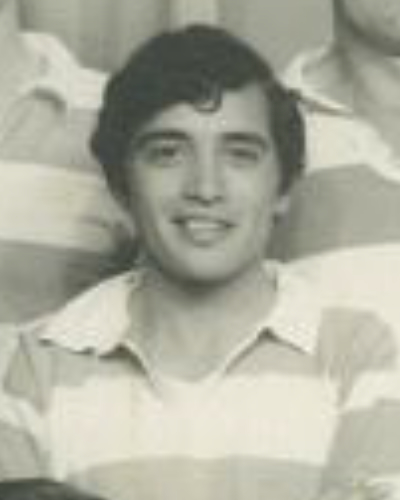
- Perry in 1968

Member of the New Zealand Parliament for New Zealand First party list
- In office 27 July 2002 – 17 September 2005

Personal details
- Born: Edwin Jock Perry; 1948
- Died: 4 June 2025 (aged 76–77)

Edwin Jock Perry (1948 – 4 June 2025) was a New Zealand politician. He was a New Zealand First Member of Parliament from 2002 to 2005.

== Early life ==
Perry was born in 1948. His father was Jock Perry, a farmer of English and Scottish ancestry from Tīnui in the Wairarapa, and his mother was Atareta Maremare Eria of Māori descent, affiliating with Rangitāne and Ngāti Kahungunu ki Wairarapa.

== Member of Parliament ==
New Zealand Parliament
Years	Term	Electorate	List	Party
2002–2005	47th	List	11	NZ First

Perry was first elected to Parliament as a list MP in the 2002 election, having also stood in the Wairarapa electorate. He formerly held office in the National Party's organisational wing. Before entering politics, he worked in marketing. He lost his seat in the 2005 election.

== Life after Parliament ==
From 2007 to 2010, Perry served as a Masterton District Councillor. At the 2008 general election, he stood unsuccessfully for New Zealand First in the Wairarapa electorate, finishing third with 2646 votes. At the 2011 and 2014 general elections, he was the New Zealand First candidate in the Tāupo electorate, coming fourth and third, respectively.

Perry died on 4 June 2025.
