= Candidates in the 1996 New Zealand general election by electorate =

New Zealand political candidates in the MMP era
Year	Party list	Candidates
1996	party lists	by electorate
1999	party lists	by electorate
2002	party lists	by electorate
2005	party lists	by electorate
2008	party lists	by electorate
2011	party lists	by electorate
2014	party lists	by electorate
2017	party lists	by electorate
2020	party lists	by electorate
2023	party lists	by electorate
2026	party lists	by electorate

65 electorate members of the New Zealand House of Representatives were elected in the general election on 12 October 1996.

== General electorates ==
Unless otherwise noted the information is sourced from here:

=== Albany ===
1996 general election: Albany
Notes:	Blue background denotes an incumbent. Pink background denotes a current list MP. Yellow background denotes a retiring MP.			
Party	Candidate	Notes	List #	Source
Progressive Green	Miles Allen		none	
NZ First	Terry Heffernan	Contested Wanganui in 1993	28	
Natural Law	Tom Hopwood		26	
Labour	Colin Hutchinson		none	
Alliance	Heather McConachy		18	
National	Murray McCully	Incumbent for East Coast Bays	21	
McGillicuddy Serious	Tina Nevin		none	
Christian Coalition	Judith Phillips		29	
ACT	Marilyn Thomas		13	
Retiring incumbents and withdrawn candidates
Labour	Ann Batten	Resigned from party; contested North Shore for New Zealand First	n/a	
National	Don McKinnon	Contesting list only		

=== Aoraki ===
1996 general election: Aoraki
Notes:	Blue background denotes an incumbent. Pink background denotes a current list MP. Yellow background denotes a retiring MP.			
Party	Candidate	Notes	List #	Source
NZ First	Jenny Bloxham	Contested Timaru in 1993	5	
National	Stuart Boag		54	
ACT	Alan Cone		none	
Christian Coalition	Robin Donovan		none	
Labour	Jim Sutton	Incumbent for Timaru	18	
Natural Law	Royal van der Werf		51	
Alliance	Rex Verity		32	

=== Auckland Central ===
1996 general election: Auckland Central
Notes:	Blue background denotes an incumbent. Pink background denotes a current list MP. Yellow background denotes a retiring MP.			
Party	Candidate	Notes	List #	Source
Progressive Green	Laurence Boomert		5	
Blokes Liberation Front	Chris Brady			
Independent	Victor Bryers			
Independent	Peter de Jonge			
National	Shane Frith		50	
ACT	Rodney Hide		7	
Independent	Adam Le Lievre			
Alliance	Sandra Lee		2	
Christian Coalition	Barrie Patterson		none	
McGillicuddy Serious	Alistair Ramsden		36	
Green Society	Simon Reeves		1	
Independent	Lynne Robertson			
Republican	Duane Sutton			
Labour	Judith Tizard	Incumbent for Panmure	11	
Natural Law	Mark Watts		8	
NZ First	Richard Whittaker		43	
Citizens Party	Wayne Young			

=== Banks Peninsula ===
1996 general election: Banks Peninsula
Notes:	Blue background denotes an incumbent. Pink background denotes a current list MP. Yellow background denotes a retiring MP.			
Party	Candidate	Notes	List #	Source
Dominion Workers	Anton Bailey			
National	David Carter	Incumbent for Selwyn	41	
Christian Coalition	Neville Chamberlain		35	
Alliance	Rod Donald		10	
Labour	Ruth Dyson	Incumbent for Lyttelton	19	
NZ First	Ross Gluer	Contested Lyttelton in 1993	25	
McGillicuddy Serious	Elizabeth Holland		none	
Independent	Ann Lewis			
ACT	Jeff Lopas			
Natural Law	David Lovell-Smith		2	

=== Bay of Plenty ===
1996 general election: Bay of Plenty
Notes:	Blue background denotes an incumbent. Pink background denotes a current list MP. Yellow background denotes a retiring MP.			
Party	Candidate	Notes	List #	Source
Alliance	Jim Bennett		none	
Communist League	Patrick Brown			
NZ First	Peter Brown		13	
Natural Law	Lew Cormack		62	
Progressive Green	Graeme Leech		none	
Te Tawharau	Rangitukehu David Paul		none	
National	Tony Ryall	Incumbent for Eastern Bay of Plenty	29	
McGillicuddy Serious	Mark Servian		1	
Labour	Julie Tucker		none	
Christian Coalition	Judy Turner		none	
ACT	Reg Turner		56	

=== Christchurch Central ===
1996 general election: Christchurch Central
Notes:	Blue background denotes an incumbent. Pink background denotes a current list MP. Yellow background denotes a retiring MP.			
Party	Candidate	Notes	List #	Source
Independent	David Christopher Ball			
ACT	Matthew Ball		26	
Progressive Green	Gillian Baillie		none	
Labour	Tim Barnett		none	
Communist League	Patrick Brown			
Natural Law	Raymond Cain		31	
Alliance	Liz Gordon		13	
United NZ	Jacinta Grice		16	
NZ First	Ron Mark	Contested Selwyn for Labour in 1993	11	
National	Kerry Sullivan		none	
Retiring incumbents and withdrawn candidates
Labour	Lianne Dalziel	Contesting list only		
National	John Connelly	Withdrew following sexual allegations	none	
Alliance	Joanna Waiwai Ryan	Won selection, result later overruled	n/a	

=== Christchurch East ===
1996 general election: Christchurch East
Notes:	Blue background denotes an incumbent. Pink background denotes a current list MP. Yellow background denotes a retiring MP.			
Party	Candidate	Notes	List #	Source
ACT	Jeffrey Buchanan		51	
McGillicuddy Serious	Phil Clayton		61	
National	Sue McKenzie		61	
Natural Law	Sean O'Connor		30	
NZ First	Lem Pearse		40	
Legalise Cannabis	Tim Shadbolt	Contested Selwyn for NZ First in 1994 by-election	8	
Labour	Larry Sutherland	Incumbent for Avon	none	
Alliance	Marie Venning		34	

=== Clutha-Southland ===
1996 general election: Clutha-Southland
Notes:	Blue background denotes an incumbent. Pink background denotes a current list MP. Yellow background denotes a retiring MP.			
Party	Candidate	Notes	List #	Source
National	Bill English	Incumbent for Wallace	9	
Alliance	Tracey Hicks		61	
ACT	Peter Snow		16	
Labour	Lesley Soper	Contested Wallace in 1993	33	
Natural Law	Gilbert Urquhart		54	
McGillicuddy Serious	Robyn West	Contested Wallace in 1993	5	
NZ First	Alan Wise		53	
Christian Coalition	Russell Zwies		none	

=== Coromandel ===
1996 general election: Coromandel
Notes:	Blue background denotes an incumbent. Pink background denotes a current list MP. Yellow background denotes a retiring MP.			
Party	Candidate	Notes	List #	Source
Superannuitants & Youth	Vern Byrne		none	
Progressive Green	Ralph Dell		none	
Alliance	Jeanette Fitzsimons	Contested Hauraki in 1993	3	
Labour	Margaret Hawkeswood		none	
Natural Law	Mimousse Hodgson		17	
ACT	Thomas Howard		33	
NZ First	Robyn McDonald		14	
United NZ	Gail McIntosh		12	
National	Murray McLean		none	
McGillicuddy Serious	Gary Young		57	
Retiring incumbents and withdrawn candidates
National	Robert Anderson	Withdrew due to illness		

=== Dunedin North ===
1996 general election: Dunedin North
Notes:	Blue background denotes an incumbent. Pink background denotes a current list MP. Yellow background denotes a retiring MP.			
Party	Candidate	Notes	List #	Source
NZ First	Neil Benson		24	
United NZ	Graeme Brown		19	
Alliance	Jim Flynn	Contested electorate in 1993	31	
Labour	Pete Hodgson		30	
Natural Law	Mary-Anne McGregor		19	
McGillicuddy Serious	Doug Mackie		14	
ACT	Michael Steeneveld		14	
National	Margie Stevens		39	

=== Dunedin South ===
1996 general election: Dunedin South
Notes:	Blue background denotes an incumbent. Pink background denotes a current list MP. Yellow background denotes a retiring MP.			
Party	Candidate	Notes	List #	Source
Progressive Green	David Beatty		none	
Labour	Michael Cullen	Incumbent for St Kilda	2	
ACT	Roland Henderson		29	
National	Malcolm MacPherson		none	
Alliance	Leah McBey		17	
NZ First	Noeline McGlynn		57	
Independent	Alan William McDonald			
United NZ	Clive Matthewson	Incumbent for Dunedin West	1	
Natural Law	Inga Schader		23	

=== Epsom ===
1996 general election: Epsom
Notes:	Blue background denotes an incumbent. Pink background denotes a current list MP. Yellow background denotes a retiring MP.			
Party	Candidate	Notes	List #	Source
ACT	John Boscawen		25	
Green Society	Sam Cunningham		5	
Labour	Helen Duncan		22	
National	Christine Fletcher	Incumbent for Eden	22	
Progressive Green	Rob Fenwick		1	
McGillicuddy Serious	Kerry Hoole		42	
Natural Law	Bryan Lee		1	
NZ First	Gavin Logan		46	
Christian Coalition	Ewen McQueen		4	
United NZ	Bryan Mockridge		20	
Libertarianz	Lindsay Perigo		1	
Alliance	Mary Tierney		37	

=== Hamilton East ===
1996 general election: Hamilton East
Notes:	Blue background denotes an incumbent. Pink background denotes a current list MP. Yellow background denotes a retiring MP.			
Party	Candidate	Notes	List #	Source
Natural Law	John G. Cleary		4	
McGillicuddy Serious	Justine Francis		13	
Independent	Patricia Neagle			
Alliance	Ashok Parbhu		39	
Christian Coalition	Lindsay Priest		39	
National	Tony Steel	Contested electorate in 1993	44	
Superannuitants & Youth	Leslie Stroud		4	
Progressive Green	Dianna Tawharu		none	
ACT	Graeme Williams		45	
NZ First	Doug Woolerton		8	
Labour	Dianne Yates		16	

=== Hamilton West ===
1996 general election: Hamilton West
Notes:	Blue background denotes an incumbent. Pink background denotes a current list MP. Yellow background denotes a retiring MP.			
Party	Candidate	Notes	List #	Source
McGillicuddy Serious	Peter Caldwell		18	
Natural Law	Mike Dunn		45	
Labour	Martin Gallagher		24	
Christian Coalition	Eleanor Goodall		37	
Progressive Green	Robert Henderson		none	
NZ First	Neil Kirton		12	
ACT	Garry Mallett		27	
Alliance	John Pemberton		57	
National	Bob Simcock		45	

=== Hunua ===
1996 general election: Hunua
Notes:	Blue background denotes an incumbent. Pink background denotes a current list MP. Yellow background denotes a retiring MP.			
Party	Candidate	Notes	List #	Source
Christian Coalition	Enosa Auva'a		41	
NZ First	Patra de Coudray		39	
ACT	Simon Harding		31	
Republican	Sophie James			
National	Warren Kyd	Incumbent for Clevedon	40	
Alliance	Huia Mitchell		64	
United NZ	John Robertson	Incumbent for Papakura	4	
Labour	Paul Schofield		none	

=== Hutt South ===
1996 general election: Hutt South
Notes:	Blue background denotes an incumbent. Pink background denotes a current list MP. Yellow background denotes a retiring MP.			
Party	Candidate	Notes	List #	Source
Alliance	Peter Love		none	
McGillicuddy Serious	Alastair McGlinchy		31	
National	Joy McLauchlan	Incumbent for Western Hutt	13	
Labour	Trevor Mallard	Incumbent for Pencarrow	none	
ACT	Chris Milne		11	
NZ First	Deborah Morris		9	
United NZ	Frank Owen		13	
Superannuitants & Youth	Jack Powell		3	
Independent	Brian Russell			
Natural Law	Angela Slade		60	

=== Ilam ===
1996 general election: Ilam
Notes:	Blue background denotes an incumbent. Pink background denotes a current list MP. Yellow background denotes a retiring MP.			
Party	Candidate	Notes	List #	Source
United NZ	Margaret Austin	Incumbent for Yaldhurst	2	
NZ First	Helen Broughton		29	
National	Gerry Brownlee	Contested Sydenham in 1993	47	
Labour	Eamon Daly		none	
Alliance	Jan Davey		25	
ACT	Nigel Mattison		15	
Natural Law	Andrew Sanderson		28	

=== Invercargill ===
1996 general election: Invercargill
Notes:	Blue background denotes an incumbent. Pink background denotes a current list MP. Yellow background denotes a retiring MP.			
Party	Candidate	Notes	List #	Source
ACT	Louis Crimp		49	
McGillicuddy Serious	Anthony Hobbs		48	
NZ First	Owen Horton		49	
Natural Law	Jacque Hughes		61	
Independent	Philip Jones	Contested electorate in 1993		
United NZ	Stuart Jordan		23	
Labour	Mark Peck		21	
National	Eric Roy	Incumbent for Awarua	23	
Alliance	Bruce Stirling		56	

=== Kaikoura ===
1996 general election: Kaikoura
Notes:	Blue background denotes an incumbent. Pink background denotes a current list MP. Yellow background denotes a retiring MP.			
Party	Candidate	Notes	List #	Source
Independent	Desmond Joseph Bell			
Natural Law	Anne Brigid		58	
Alliance	Ian Ewen-Street		52	
McGillicuddy Serious	Rodney Hansen		33	
NZ First	Tom Harrison		20	
Labour	Marian Hobbs	Contested Selwyn in 1994	12	
National	Doug Kidd		14	
ACT	Peter King-Talbot		52	

=== Karapiro ===
1996 general election: Karapiro
Notes:	Blue background denotes an incumbent. Pink background denotes a current list MP. Yellow background denotes a retiring MP.			
Party	Candidate	Notes	List #	Source
ACT	Vince Ashworth		12	
McGillicuddy Serious	Craig Beere		22	
Christian Coalition	Philip Holdway-Davis		none	
Natural Law	Belinda Hills		47	
Alliance	John Kilbride		36	
National	John Luxton	Incumbent for Matamata	33	
United NZ	Tim Macindoe		11	
Labour	Sue Moroney		31	
Mana Māori	Lai Toy		none	

=== Mahia ===
1996 general election: Mahia
Notes:	Blue background denotes an incumbent. Pink background denotes a current list MP. Yellow background denotes a retiring MP.			
Party	Candidate	Notes	List #	Source
ACT	Craig Bauld			none
Independent	Luke Donnelly			
National	Wayne Kimber	Contested Gisborne in 1993	59	
Labour	Janet Mackey	Incumbent for Gisborne	17	
Natural Law	Roy Neumegen		none	
NZ First	Gordon Preston		47	
Alliance	Graham Smith		59	

=== Mana ===
1996 general election: Mana
Notes:	Blue background denotes an incumbent. Pink background denotes a current list MP. Yellow background denotes a retiring MP.			
Party	Candidate	Notes	List #	Source
Progressive Green	David Green		11	
NZ First	Graham Harding		17	
Independent	Marie Iupeli			
Labour	Graham Kelly	Incumbent for Porirua	13	
Christian Coalition	Renton Maclauchlan		36	
McGillicuddy Serious	Grant Prankered		29	
Natural Law	Wayne Shepherd		49	
Alliance	Vernon Tile		33	
National	Allan Wells		none	
ACT	Neil Wilson		44	

=== Mangere ===
1996 general election: Mangere
Notes:	Blue background denotes an incumbent. Pink background denotes a current list MP. Yellow background denotes a retiring MP.			
Party	Candidate	Notes	List #	Source
Natural Law	Grant Bilyard		none	
National	David Broome		none	
Labour	Taito Phillip Field	Incumbent for Otara	none	
United NZ	Francis Ifopo		21	
ACT	Kevin Mathewson		46	
NZ First	Thomas Moana		60	
Advance NZ	Afamasaga Rasmussen		4	
Alliance	Len Richards	Contested electorate in 1993	60	
Christian Coalition	James Ward		none	

=== Manukau East ===
1996 general election: Manukau East
Notes:	Blue background denotes an incumbent. Pink background denotes a current list MP. Yellow background denotes a retiring MP.			
Party	Candidate	Notes	List #	Source
NZ First	Ngaire Clark		58	
ACT	Patrick Cole		none	
Natural Law	Greg Dodds		33	
United NZ	Ted Faleauto		8	
Alliance	Tafa Mulitalo		21	
Labour	Ross Robertson	Incumbent for Papatoetoe	none	
Conservatives	Trevor Rogers	Incumbent for Howick	1	
Advance NZ	Taimalelagi Tofilau		3	
Communist League	Annalucia Vermunt			
National	Ken Yee		64	

=== Manurewa ===
1996 general election: Manurewa
Notes:	Blue background denotes an incumbent. Pink background denotes a current list MP. Yellow background denotes a retiring MP.			
Party	Candidate	Notes	List #	Source
Green Society	Colin Amery		8	
McGillicuddy Serious	Derek Craig	Contested electorate in 1993	30	
Labour	George Hawkins		none	
United NZ	Malcolm Hood		9	
Alliance	Willie Jackson		20	
Natural Law	Faye McLaren		50	
NZ First	Roger Mail		51	
National	Les Marinkovich		none	
Christian Coalition	Braden Matson		31	
ACT	John Thompson		40	

=== Maungakiekie ===
1996 general election: Maungakiekie
Notes:	Blue background denotes an incumbent. Pink background denotes a current list MP. Yellow background denotes a retiring MP.			
Party	Candidate	Notes	List #	Source
Progressive Green	Dorothy Bond		none	
Natural Law	Graeme Lodge		20	
NZ First	Gilbert Myles	Contested Roskill in 1993	15	
Labour	Richard Northey	Incumbent for Onehunga	29	
ACT	Angus Ogilvie		28	
McGillicuddy Serious	John Orchard		none	
Republican	Bill Puru			
Alliance	Matt Robson		7	
United NZ	Ramparkash Samujh		10	
Advance NZ	England So'onalole		1	
National	Belinda Vernon		18	

=== Napier ===
1996 general election: Napier
Notes:	Blue background denotes an incumbent. Pink background denotes a current list MP. Yellow background denotes a retiring MP.			
Party	Candidate	Notes	List #	Source
Labour	Geoff Braybrooke		none	
Alliance	Robin Gwynn		53	
ACT	Jean Hill		19	
Natural Law	Ian Levingston		32	
NZ First	Stuart Spencer		42	
National	Kathryn Ward		65	

=== Nelson ===
1996 general election: Nelson
Notes:	Blue background denotes an incumbent. Pink background denotes a current list MP. Yellow background denotes a retiring MP.			
Party	Candidate	Notes	List #	Source
Christian Coalition	Nick Barber	Contested electorate in 1993	18	
Labour	John Blincoe		23	
NZ First	Bernard Downey	Contested electorate in 1993	22	
Natural Law	Michelle McGregor		39	
McGillicuddy Serious	Tim Owens		19	
National	Nick Smith	Incumbent for Tasman	30	
Alliance	Mike Ward	Contested electorate in 1993	47	
ACT	Graeme Williams		none	

=== New Lynn ===
1996 general election: New Lynn
Notes:	Blue background denotes an incumbent. Pink background denotes a current list MP. Yellow background denotes a retiring MP.			
Party	Candidate	Notes	List #	Source
Progressive Green	Mark Darin		none	
McGillicuddy Serious	Richard Foster		none	
National	Richard Gardner		none	
Labour	Phil Goff	Incumbent for Roskill	none	
United NZ	John Hubscher		26	
Natural Law	Les McGrath		63	
NZ First	Dawn Mullins	Contested electorate in 1993	52	
Advance NZ	James Prescott		2	
Alliance	Cliff Robinson	Contested electorate in 1993	none	

=== New Plymouth ===
1996 general election: New Plymouth
Notes:	Blue background denotes an incumbent. Pink background denotes a current list MP. Yellow background denotes a retiring MP.			
Party	Candidate	Notes	List #	Source
Labour	Harry Duynhoven		none	
Alliance	Sue Gaffy		40	
ACT	Tony Huston		32	
National	Roger Maxwell	Incumbent for Taranaki	25	
Progressive Green	Paul O'Neill		none	
NZ First	Harry Slaats		48	
Natural Law	Bruce Sowry	Contested electorate in 1993	29	

=== North Shore ===
1996 general election: North Shore
Notes:	Blue background denotes an incumbent. Pink background denotes a current list MP. Yellow background denotes a retiring MP.			
Party	Candidate	Notes	List #	Source
NZ First	Ann Batten	Contested Glenfield in 1993	3	
Christian Coalition	Julie Belding		8	
Labour	Perry Cameron		none	
Alliance	Joel Cayford	Contested electorate in 1993	23	
McGillicuddy Serious	Felix Clark		none	
Progressive Green	Cassandra Doherty		none	
Superannuitants & Youth	Trevor Gilligan		2	
Green Society	Bradley Heising		10	
Natural Law	Gail Pianta		7	
ACT	Derek Quigley	Former MP	2	
National	Wayne Mapp		58	

=== Northcote ===
1996 general election: Northcote
Notes:	Blue background denotes an incumbent. Pink background denotes a current list MP. Yellow background denotes a retiring MP.			
Party	Candidate	Notes	List #	Source
ACT	Kieran Bird		30	
Alliance	Grant Gillon	Contested Glenfield in 1993	11	
Labour	Ann Hartley	Contested Birkenhead in 1993	47	
United NZ	Peter Hilt	Incumbent for Glenfield	6	
Progressive Green	Peter Lee		9	
Green Society	Merete Molving		3	
Natural Law	Kevin O'Brien		22	
NZ First	Janie Phillips		26	
National	Ian Revell	Incumbent for Birkenhead	36	
McGillicuddy Serious	Bernard Smith		8	
Republican	Pamera Warner			

=== Northland ===
1996 general election: Northland
Notes:	Blue background denotes an incumbent. Pink background denotes a current list MP. Yellow background denotes a retiring MP.			
Party	Candidate	Notes	List #	Source
Natural Law	Leigh Bush		57	
National	John Carter	Incumbent for Far North	34	
Independent	Cherry Daly			
Alliance	Frank Grover		5	
Christian Coalition	Ned Jack		none	
ACT	John Latimer		38	
Labour	Peter Pangari		none	
NZ First	Ron Peters		none	
Progressive Green	Kevin Prime		15	
McGillicuddy Serious	Dale Magnus Taylor		47	

=== Ohariu-Belmont ===
1996 general election: Ohariu-Belmont
Notes:	Blue background denotes an incumbent. Pink background denotes a current list MP. Yellow background denotes a retiring MP.			
Party	Candidate	Notes	List #	Source
Alliance	Phillida Bunkle		9	
NZ First	Ernie Davis		none	
Natural Law	Penelope Donovan		6	
United NZ	Peter Dunne	Incumbent for Onslow	3	
ACT	Ken Shirley	Former MP	3	
Labour	Verna Smith	Contested Eden in 1993	25	
Christian Coalition	Rosemarie Thomas		15	
McGillicuddy Serious	Jonat Wharton		21	

=== Otago ===
1996 general election: Otago
Notes:	Blue background denotes an incumbent. Pink background denotes a current list MP. Yellow background denotes a retiring MP.			
Party	Candidate	Notes	List #	Source
Independent	Bruce Albitson	Contested Waitaki in 1993		
Christian Coalition	Grant Bradfield		6	
ACT	Anne Dill		9	
Natural Law	Carolyn Drake		34	
Independent	Garth Hamilton			
National	Gavan Herlihy		57	
United NZ	Kevin Fleury		17	
McGillicuddy Serious	Mike Legge		25	
Conservatives	Margaret McHugh		2	
NZ First	Stan Perkins		55	
Alliance	Norman Wood		45	
Labour	Janet Yiakmis		none	

=== Otaki ===
1996 general election: Otaki
Notes:	Blue background denotes an incumbent. Pink background denotes a current list MP. Yellow background denotes a retiring MP.			
Party	Candidate	Notes	List #	Source
ACT	Robin Culee		34	
Natural Law	Ian Gaustad		16	
Christian Coalition	Kevin Honore		33	
Labour	Judy Keall	Incumbent for Horowhenua	none	
Alliance	Mike Smith		16	
National	Roger Sowry	Incumbent for Kapiti	15	
NZ First	Jack Tamihana		56	
Retiring incumbents and withdrawn candidates
ACT	Eddie Perkins	Ineligible due to citizenship		

=== Owairaka ===
1996 general election: Owairaka
Notes:	Blue background denotes an incumbent. Pink background denotes a current list MP. Yellow background denotes a retiring MP.			
Party	Candidate	Notes	List #	Source
Advance NZ	Eric Chuah		5	
Labour	Helen Clark	Incumbent for Mt Albert	1	
ACT	Andrew Couper		none	
Natural Law	Martin Davy		52	
McGillicuddy Serious	Julia Johnson		50	
NZ First	Jason Keiller		20	
Alliance	Keith Locke	Contested Eden in 1993	24	
National	Phil Raffills		46	
Retiring incumbents and withdrawn candidates
National	Cheryl Parsons	Withdrew due to low list placing	66	

=== Pakuranga ===
1996 general election: Pakuranga
Notes:	Blue background denotes an incumbent. Pink background denotes a current list MP. Yellow background denotes a retiring MP.			
Party	Candidate	Notes	List #	Source
Alliance	Trevor Barnard		29	
Labour	James Clarke		none	
Progressive Green	Catherine Forsyth		none	
Natural Law	John Hodgson		3	
ACT	Heather Mackay	Contested electorate in 1993	23	
Christian Coalition	Craig Starrenburg		none	
National	Maurice Williamson		20	

=== Palmerston North ===
1996 general election: Palmerston North
Notes:	Blue background denotes an incumbent. Pink background denotes a current list MP. Yellow background denotes a retiring MP.			
Party	Candidate	Notes	List #	Source
Alliance	Gerard Hehir	Contested electorate in 1993	28	
Christian Coalition	Grant Bowater		16	
NZ First	Trevor Jans		38	
Labour	Steve Maharey		none	
Natural Law	Tony Martin		10	
National	George Mathew		62	
McGillicuddy Serious	Paddy O'Neil		none	
ACT	Val Wilde		17	

=== Port Waikato ===
1996 general election: Port Waikato
Notes:	Blue background denotes an incumbent. Pink background denotes a current list MP. Yellow background denotes a retiring MP.			
Party	Candidate	Notes	List #	Source
National	Bill Birch	Incumbent for Franklin	3	
United NZ	Diane Colson		7	
Natural Law	Rhonda-Lisa Comins		64	
NZ First	John Forbes		31	
Christian Coalition	Rick Hayward		none	
Labour	Terry Hughes		none	
ACT	Marlene Lamb		20	
Alliance	Francis Petchey		65	
McGillicuddy Serious	David Sutcliffe		64	
Retiring incumbents and withdrawn candidates
Labour	Paul Harris		none	

=== Rakaia ===
1996 general election: Rakaia
Notes:	Blue background denotes an incumbent. Pink background denotes a current list MP. Yellow background denotes a retiring MP.			
Party	Candidate	Notes	List #	Source
Christian Coalition	Rosemary Francis		15	
United NZ	John Howie		15	
NZ First	Colleen Page		32	
ACT	Dean Richardson		37	
Alliance	Mark Robertson		62	
National	Jenny Shipley		4	
Natural Law	Ian Smillie		55	
Labour	Geoff Stone		39	

=== Rangitikei ===
1996 general election: Rangitikei
Notes:	Blue background denotes an incumbent. Pink background denotes a current list MP. Yellow background denotes a retiring MP.			
Party	Candidate	Notes	List #	Source
ACT	Victor Bailey		55	
Independent	Bruce Beetham	Former MP		
Natural Law	John Blatchford		46	
Conservatives	Jim Howard		18	
Christian Coalition	Vic Jarvis		20	
Alliance	Hamish MacIntyre	Contested Manawatu in 1993	19	
National	Denis Marshall		32	
Labour	Jill White	Incumbent for Manawatu	9	
NZ First	Peter Woolston		54	

=== Rimutaka ===
1996 general election: Rimutaka
Notes:	Blue background denotes an incumbent. Pink background denotes a current list MP. Yellow background denotes a retiring MP.			
Party	Candidate	Notes	List #	Source
National	Karyn Bisdee		48	
ACT	Owen Dance		21	
McGillicuddy Serious	Dan Hegarty		none	
Christian Coalition	Geoff Hounsell		12	
NZ First	Peter McCardle	Incumbent for Heretaunga	4	
Labour	Paul Swain	Incumbent for Eastern Hutt	none	
Alliance	Brendan Tracey		55	
Natural Law	Neil West		none	

=== Rodney ===
1996 general election: Rodney
Notes:	Blue background denotes an incumbent. Pink background denotes a current list MP. Yellow background denotes a retiring MP.			
Party	Candidate	Notes	List #	Source
Green Society	Vic Albon		6	
Labour	Mike Coutanche		none	
ACT	Brian Dent		53	
NZ First	David Gill		34	
Progressive Green	Callum Hayes		none	
United NZ	Michael Hilt		28	
Alliance	Mike Lee		none	
Independent	Ross Meurant	Incumbent for Hobson		
National	Lockwood Smith	Incumbent for Kaipara	8	
McGillicuddy Serious	Val Smith		7	
Natural Law	Angela Wood		36	

=== Rongotai ===
1996 general election: Rongotai
Notes:	Blue background denotes an incumbent. Pink background denotes a current list MP. Yellow background denotes a retiring MP.			
Party	Candidate	Notes	List #	Source
United NZ	Steven Bright		14	
ACT	Stephen Gore		43	
Alliance	Bill Hamilton		26	
Labour	Annette King	Incumbent for Miramar	6	
National	David Major		38	
Private Enterprise	Frank Moncur			
Natural Law	Richard Moreham		15	
Asia Pacific	Mano'o Mulitalo		1	
Legalise Cannabis	Kevin Patrick O'Connell		none	
McGillicuddy Serious	Greg Smith		10	

=== Rotorua ===
1996 general election: Rotorua
Notes:	Blue background denotes an incumbent. Pink background denotes a current list MP. Yellow background denotes a retiring MP.			
Party	Candidate	Notes	List #	Source
National	Max Bradford	Incumbent for Tarawera	none	
Natural Law	Frank Gwynne		38	
McGillicuddy Serious	Adrian Holroyd		20	
Labour	Rosemary Michie		46	
Conservatives	Dennis Quirke		4	
Alliance	Keith Ridings	Contested electorate in 1993	22	
NZ First	Charles Sturt		44	
Te Tawharau	Hawea Vercoe		3	
Progressive Green	Allan Williams		none	
Christian Coalition	Geoff Winter		38	
ACT	Stephen Wrathall		47	

=== Tamaki ===
1996 general election: Tamaki
Notes:	Blue background denotes an incumbent. Pink background denotes a current list MP. Yellow background denotes a retiring MP.			
Party	Candidate	Notes	List #	Source
NZ First	Ron Chamberlain		45	
Independent	Sue Henry			
Labour	Jonathan Hunt	Incumbent for New Lynn	7	
Advance NZ	Manu Prescott		8	
McGillicuddy Serious	A.J. Russell		none	
ACT	Patricia Schnauer		5	
National	Clem Simich		42	
Progressive Green	Rodger Spiller		6	
Alliance	Rosalie Steward		42	
Green Society	Peter Whitmore		2	

=== Taranaki-King Country ===
1996 general election: Taranaki-King Country
Notes:	Blue background denotes an incumbent. Pink background denotes a current list MP. Yellow background denotes a retiring MP.			
Party	Candidate	Notes	List #	Source
Mana Māori	Jacqui Amohanga		7	
National	Jim Bolger		1	
Labour	Peter Calvert		none	
Alliance	Kevin Campbell		48	
Natural Law	Joanna Grieg		59	
McGillicuddy Serious	Anand Hayso	Contested electorate in 1993	17	
ACT	Trevor Johnson		none	
NZ First	Robin Ord		33	
Independent	Brett Power			
Retiring incumbents and withdrawn candidates
Labour	Murray Simpson		none	

=== Taupo ===
1996 general election: Taupo
Notes:	Blue background denotes an incumbent. Pink background denotes a current list MP. Yellow background denotes a retiring MP.			
Party	Candidate	Notes	List #	Source
Labour	Mark Burton		10	
Alliance	Sheryl Cadman		43	
McGillicuddy Serious	David Dick		35	
ACT	Adrian Dixon		41	
Natural Law	Jan Flynn		53	
National	John McCarthy		none	
NZ First	Ian Peters	Former MP	16	
Conservatives	Bob Vine		5	

=== Tauranga ===
1996 general election: Tauranga
Notes:	Blue background denotes an incumbent. Pink background denotes a current list MP. Yellow background denotes a retiring MP.			
Party	Candidate	Notes	List #	Source
Alliance	Gary Barham	Contested electorate in 1993	50	
McGillicuddy Serious	Graeme Cairns		65	
Labour	Stephanie Hammond		none	
Independent	Maxime Leech			
National	Katherine O'Regan	Incumbent for Waipa	10	
NZ First	Winston Peters		1	
ACT	Michael Ryan			
Christian Coalition	Kel Steiner		none	
Te Tawharau	Steven Te Kani		5	
Natural Law	Helen Treadwell	Contested Whangarei in 1993	40	

=== Tukituki ===
1996 general election: Tukituki
Notes:	Blue background denotes an incumbent. Pink background denotes a current list MP. Yellow background denotes a retiring MP.			
Party	Candidate	Notes	List #	Source
Alliance	Harry Alchin-Smith		41	
Labour	Rick Barker		28	
NZ First	Keri James Kingi		41	
ACT	John Ormond		10	
Natural Law	Martyn Ouseley		27	
National	Graeme Reeves	Contested Miramar in 1993	60	
Christian Coalition	Helma Vermeulen		24	
Asia Pacific	Tuli Wong Kee		6	

=== Waimakariri ===
1996 general election: Waimakariri
Notes:	Blue background denotes an incumbent. Pink background denotes a current list MP. Yellow background denotes a retiring MP.			
Party	Candidate	Notes	List #	Source
ACT	Ross Andrews		none	
Christian Coalition	Lindsay Bain		23	
Natural Law	Mike Barthmelmeh		21	
NZ First	Claire Bulman		19	
National	Jim Gerard	Incumbent for Rangiora	17	
Independent	Peter Hawkhead			
Labour	Mike Moore	Incumbent for Christchurch North	none	
Alliance	John Wright	Contested Rangiora in 1993	4	

=== Waipareira ===
1996 general election: Waipareira
Notes:	Blue background denotes an incumbent. Pink background denotes a current list MP. Yellow background denotes a retiring MP.			
Party	Candidate	Notes	List #	Source
Natural Law	Judy Boock		13	
Labour	Chris Carter	Incumbent for Te Atatu	none	
NZ First	Jack Elder	Incumbent for Henderson	7	
ACT	Chris Fidoe		none	
Alliance	Laila Harré	Contested Te Atatu in 1993	8	
National	Brian Neeson	Incumbent for Waitakere	35	
Republican	Akesa Tagaloa-Faleiva			

=== Wairarapa ===
1996 general election: Wairarapa
Notes:	Blue background denotes an incumbent. Pink background denotes a current list MP. Yellow background denotes a retiring MP.			
Party	Candidate	Notes	List #	Source
Natural Law	Bruce Brown		18	
National	Wyatt Creech		12	
ACT	Derek Daniell		42	
World Socialist	Christopher Fackney			
NZ First	George Groombridge		35	
Progressive Green	Mathew Horrocks		12	
Christian Coalition	Mike Lloyd		10	
Alliance	Dave MacPherson		14	
Labour	Lynette Stutz		35	
McGillicuddy Serious	Vince Terreni	Contested Auckland Central in 1990	none	

=== Waitakere ===
1996 general election: Waitakere
Notes:	Blue background denotes an incumbent. Pink background denotes a current list MP. Yellow background denotes a retiring MP.			
Party	Candidate	Notes	List #	Source
Progressive Green	Mark Bellingham		4	
Superannuitants & Youth	John Cronin	Contested Tauranga in 1993	1	
ACT	Stephen Depiazzi		54	
McGillicuddy Serious	Gravity George		none	
Green Society	Hans Grueber		4	
National	Marie Hasler	Former MP	27	
Natural Law	Kay Morgan		25	
NZ First	John Riddell		62	
Labour	Suzanne Sinclair	Incumbent for Titirangi	27	
Alliance	Liz Thomas		38	

=== Wellington Central ===
1996 general election: Wellington Central
Notes:	Blue background denotes an incumbent. Pink background denotes a current list MP. Yellow background denotes a retiring MP.			
Party	Candidate	Notes	List #	Source
Legalise Cannabis	Michael Appleby		1	
Christian Coalition	Robin Corner		14	
Progressive Green	Alison Davis		3	
Independent	Andy Foster			
United NZ	Pauline Gardiner	Incumbent for Wellington-Karori	5	
McGillicuddy Serious	Ross Gardner		27	
Alliance	Danna Glendining		30	
Mana Māori	Waiariki Grace		12	
Libertarianz	Nikolas Haden		9	
Natural Law	Daniel Meares		14	
NZ First	Sarah Porter		none	
ACT	Richard Prebble	Contested Auckland Central in 1993	1	
Asia Pacific	Rama Ramanathan		2	
Independent	Peter Franklin Robinson			
Labour	Alick Shaw		none	
National	Mark Thomas		49	

=== West Coast-Tasman ===
1996 general election: West Coast-Tasman
Notes:	Blue background denotes an incumbent. Pink background denotes a current list MP. Yellow background denotes a retiring MP.			
Party	Candidate	Notes	List #	Source
Alliance	Richard Davies		49	
Progressive Green	Gwenny Davis		7	
Christian Coalition	Iola Griffin		none	
ACT	Owen Jennings		6	
NZ First	Marlene Kennedy		61	
National	Margaret Moir	Contested West Coast in 1993	51	
Labour	Damien O'Connor	Incumbent for West Coast	32	
Natural Law	Mark Rayner		41	
McGillicuddy Serious	Steve Richards		6	
Independent	Ken Waldron			

=== Whanganui ===
1996 general election: Whanganui
Notes:	Blue background denotes an incumbent. Pink background denotes a current list MP. Yellow background denotes a retiring MP.			
Party	Candidate	Notes	List #	Source
Christian Coalition	Gael Donoghue	Contested electorate in 1993	11	
National	Peter Gresham	Incumbent for Waitotara	24	
Natural Law	Kevin Harvey		43	
Alliance	Caroline Lampp		27	
ACT	John Lithgow	Former MP	39	
NZ First	Duncan Mathews		50	
Labour	Jill Pettis		14	
Conservatives	Eric Werder		3	

=== Whangarei ===
1996 general election: Whangarei
Notes:	Blue background denotes an incumbent. Pink background denotes a current list MP. Yellow background denotes a retiring MP.			
Party	Candidate	Notes	List #	Source
National	John Banks		16	
NZ First	Brian Donnelly	Contested electorate in 1993	6	
Independent	Paul Gourlie	Contested electorate in 1993		
Labour	Kevin Grose		none	
Natural Law	Guy David Hatchard		9	
Independent	Mary Le Myre			
Alliance	Brian Morris		63	
ACT	Muriel Newman		8	
United NZ	Gray Phillips		29	
McGillicuddy Serious	Richard Wolfe		none	

=== Wigram ===
1996 general election: Wigram
Notes:	Blue background denotes an incumbent. Pink background denotes a current list MP. Yellow background denotes a retiring MP.			
Party	Candidate	Notes	List #	Source
Progressive Green	Jules Adams		none	
Alliance	Jim Anderton	Incumbent for Sydenham	1	
United NZ	John Austin		none	
NZ First	Nicci Bergman	Contested Sydenham in 1993	23	
Economic Euthenics	Tubby Hansen	Contested Sydenham in 1993		
McGillicuddy Serious	Nick Harper		45	
Natural Law	Warwick Jones		11	
National	Angus McKay		53	
Dominion Workers	Clifford Mundy	Contested Sydenham in 1993		
Labour	Mick Ozimek		none	
Independent	Averil Tunridge			
Independent	Peter Wakeman			
ACT	Stu Whyte			

== Maori electorates ==
=== Te Puku O Te Whenua ===
1996 general election: Te Puku O Te Whenua
Notes:	Blue background denotes an incumbent. Pink background denotes a current list MP. Yellow background denotes a retiring MP.			
Party	Candidate	Notes	List #	Source
ACT	Donna Awatere Huata		4	
Natural Law	Tim Irwin	Contested Southern Maori in 1993	48	
Alliance	Rewi James		54	
Te Tawharau	Niko John Maihi		4	
Mana Māori	Ken Mair		8	
Independent	Te Aroha Jack Mei			
Indigenous Peoples	Turangapito Parata			
National	Timoti Te Heuheu		none	
Labour	Rino Tirikatene		none	
Christian Coalition	Maahi Tukapa		34	
NZ First	Rana Waitai		27	
Nga Iwi Morehu	Jennifer Waitai-Rapana			

=== Te Tai Hauauru ===
1996 general election: Te Tai Hauauru
Notes:	Blue background denotes an incumbent. Pink background denotes a current list MP. Yellow background denotes a retiring MP.			
Party	Candidate	Notes	List #	Source
McGillicuddy Serious	Derek Alston		none	
Mana Māori	Angeline Greensill		1	
Alliance	Te Pare Joseph		58	
ACT	Merania Karauria		18	
Labour	Nanaia Mahuta		8	
National	Tahuna Minhinnick		none	
NZ First	Tuku Morgan		10	
Indigenous Peoples	Kotene Pihima			
Natural Law	Ken Thomas		44	
Christian Coalition	Rawiri Whare	Contested Southern Maori in 1993	none	

=== Te Tai Rawhiti ===
1996 general election: Te Tai Rawhiti
Notes:	Blue background denotes an incumbent. Pink background denotes a current list MP. Yellow background denotes a retiring MP.			
Party	Candidate	Notes	List #	Source
ACT	Hinemoa Awatere			
National	Peta Butt		56	
Te Tawharau	Willie Coates		1	
NZ First	Tuariki Delamere		18	
Mana Māori	Tame Iti	Contested Eastern Maori in 1993	2	
Alliance	Alamein Kopu	Contested Eastern Maori in 1993	12	
Natural Law	Lynne Patterson		24	
Labour	Peter Tapsell	Incumbent for Eastern Maori	none	

=== Te Tai Tokerau ===
1996 general election: Te Tai Tokerau
Notes:	Blue background denotes an incumbent. Pink background denotes a current list MP. Yellow background denotes a retiring MP.			
Party	Candidate	Notes	List #	Source
Natural Law	Mere Austin		5	
Independent	Maryanne Baker			
Alliance	Peter Campbell		35	
National	Rihari Dick Dargaville		55	
Labour	Joe Hawke		15	
NZ First	Tau Henare	Incumbent for Northern Maori	2	
McGillicuddy Serious	K.T. Julian		4	
Christian Coalition	Larry Sytherland		none	
Indigenous Peoples	Kingi Eruera Taurua			

=== Te Tai Tonga ===
1996 general election: Te Tai Tonga
Notes:	Blue background denotes an incumbent. Pink background denotes a current list MP. Yellow background denotes a retiring MP.			
Party	Candidate	Notes	List #	Source
National	Cliff Bedwell		63	
Alliance	Hone Kaiwai		15	
Mana Māori	Eva Rickard		none	
Labour	Whetu Tirikatene-Sullivan	Incumbent for Southern Maori	none	
Legalise Cannabis	Honty Whaanga		17	
NZ First	Tu Wyllie		36	
