= Tight five =

Tight five may refer to:

- The five non-loose forwards in a rugby union scrum
- The Tight Five, a group of Māori New Zealand Parliament members first elected in 1996
- Bach Tight Five, a musical project of heavy metal singer Sebastian Bach
- A five-minute stand-up comedy routine
