= Mauri Pacific =

- Leader: Tau Henare
- Founded: 28 October 1998
- Dissolved: December 2001
- Split from: NZ First
- Ideology: Multiculturalism

Mauri Pacific (lit. 'Spirit of the Pacific') was a short-lived political party in New Zealand. It was formed in 1998 by five former members of the New Zealand First party. It has often been described as a Māori party. Officially, Mauri Pacific was a multiculturalist party, welcoming anyone who supported racial and cultural harmony. Three of its five MPs were Māori, and two were Pākehā.

The party only contested one election and failed to retain any of its five seats in Parliament. The party disbanded shortly afterwards.

== Origins ==
Mauri Pacific had its origins in New Zealand First, a populist party led by former National Party minister Winston Peters. After the 1996 election, New Zealand First won 17 seats, including a sweep of all five Māori electorates. It held the balance of power in Parliament and eventually went into coalition with the incumbent conservative National Party with Peters as deputy prime minister. Gradually, however, the relationship between New Zealand First and the National Party deteriorated. In August 1998, Peters was sacked from Cabinet, and he pulled New Zealand First out of the coalition.

Many New Zealand First MPs were not willing to follow their party back into Opposition, however. Eight of the party's sixteen MPs defected, establishing themselves as independents. These MPs supported the National Party government, enabling it to keep a slim majority in Parliament.

Sometime later, five of the newly independent MPs gathered together to establish Mauri Pacific. They were led by Tau Henare, Minister of Māori Affairs and former deputy leader of New Zealand First. The other MPs were Tuku Morgan, Rana Waitai, Jack Elder, and Ann Batten.

Henare, Morgan, and Waitai were previously members of the so-called "tight five", New Zealand First's group of Māori MPs. (The other two members of the "tight five," Tu Wyllie and Tuariki Delamere, were not involved with Mauri Pacific – Wyllie had remained with New Zealand First, and Delamere eventually joined the small Te Tawharau party.) Because its three highest-profile MPs were Māori, Mauri Pacific was considered by many to be a Māori party. Its policies were generally favourable towards Māori, such as its proposal to give customary Māori law equal status to modern Western law, but the party portrayed this as multiculturalism rather than mere Māori advocacy. The party made a particular attempt to gather support from Pacific Islanders, although was not particularly successful.

== Fate ==
Mauri Pacific was not well received by the general public. The behaviour of its members (particularly Tuku Morgan) had been criticised even before the splintering of New Zealand First, and the perception that these MPs had "betrayed" their former party was strong. Many voters believed that Mauri Pacific had been born out of political opportunism, not out of firmly-held principle. It later came out that Henare had challenged Peters for leadership of New Zealand First prior to the split. In addition, the party's policies were criticised as vague and unspecific.

In June, Independent and former New Zealand First MP Tuariki Delamere asked his supporters to give their party vote to Mauri Pacific.

In November 1999 one of Mauri Pacific's candidates resigned to join the United New Zealand party, citing Mauri Pacific's lack of commitment to Asian voters.

In the 1999 elections, Mauri Pacific stood candidates in twenty electorates. It also put forward a party list of twenty-two people. However, the party gained only 4,008 list votes (0.19% of the total), putting it in thirteenth place. None of Mauri Pacific's sitting MPs were re-elected or even won second place. Shortly after the election, Mauri Pacific disbanded, and the party was deregistered at its own request by the Electoral Commission.

=== Party list ===
The party's party list at the 1999 election was: Tau Henare, Tuku Morgan, Peta Si'ulepa, Rana Waitai, Ann Batten, Te Orohi Paul, Atawhai Tibble, Amokura Huia Panoho, Rovina Anderson, Eric Chuah, Danny Turia, Rajesh Masters, Martin Kaipo, Helen Akhtari, Trieste Te Awe Awe, Sharon Faloon, Rayna Waitai, Fa'amatuainu Iakopo, Laura Mason, Richard Waitai, Kelly Waitai and Api Malu.

== See also ==
- Waka-jumping
- Category:Mauri Pacific politicians
