= Te Whakakitenga =

Governing council of New Zealand's Waikato Tainui tribal confederation

Te Whakakitenga o Waikato

Type
- Type: unicameral

Leadership
- Chair: Tipa Mahuta
- Deputy Chair: Ngatitahinga Wilson
- Te Arataura Chair: Tukoroirangi Morgan
- Seats: 175

Elections
- Last election: 13 January 2024
- Next election: 2027

Meeting place
- Ngāruawāhia, Waikato region, New Zealand

Website
- http://waikatotainui.com/

Te Whakakitenga o Waikato (also called the House in English) is the governing council of the Waikato Tainui iwi in New Zealand. Members are elected for three year terms, with each of 68 marae electing two members.

The parliament was established by Tāwhiao of the Kīngitanga in 1889 or 1890 as Te Kauhanganui.

== Background ==
Te Whakakitenga was originally established at Maungakawa as Te Kauhangannui, near Cambridge.

It was founded by Tāwhiao after his proposal to set up a pan-Māori parliament in New Zealand to complement the colonial legislative council was denied by Auckland authorities. The parliament's members consisted of appointed tribal delegates who advised Tāwhiao on policy and was used by him to communicate with his subjects.

== Executive ==
The executive board of Te Whakakitenga is Te Arataura. This group consists of 10 members chosen by the parliament from amongst their members and 1 member chosen by the reigning Māori monarch.

== Leadership ==
=== Chairperson ===
List of chairpersons
Photo	Name	Term of office			Monarch
Photo	Name	Start	End	Duration	Monarch
?
	Tania Martin	?	25 November 2012	?	Tūheitia r. 2006–2024
vacant		25 November 2012	August 2013	~9 months	Tūheitia r. 2006–2024
	Maxine Moana-Tuwhangai	August 2013	September 2017	~4 years 1 month	Tūheitia r. 2006–2024
	Parekawhia McLean	September 2017	13 January 2024	~6 years 4 months	Tūheitia r. 2006–2024
	Tipa Mahuta	13 January 2024	incumbent	2 years	Tūheitia r. 2006–2024
	Tipa Mahuta	13 January 2024	incumbent	2 years	Nga wai hono i te po r. 2024–present

=== Te Arataura chairperson ===
List of Te Arataura chairpersons
Photo	Name	Term of office			Monarch
Photo	Name	Start	End	Duration	Monarch
?
	Tukoroirangi Morgan	2006	2012	6 years	Tūheitia r. 2006–2024
	?				Tūheitia r. 2006–2024
	Linda Te Aho		2022		Tūheitia r. 2006–2024
	Tukoroirangi Morgan	2022	incumbent	3 years	Tūheitia r. 2006–2024
	Tukoroirangi Morgan	2022	incumbent	3 years	Nga wai hono i te po r. 2024–present
