= Te Puku O Te Whenua =

Te Puku O Te Whenua (lit. '"the belly of the land"') was one of the five new New Zealand parliamentary Māori electorates created in 1996 for MMP. It was replaced in the 1999 election.

== Population centres ==
The electorate included the following population centres:

- Dannevirke
- Feilding
- Hastings
- Hāwera
- Masterton
- Napier
- New Plymouth
- Palmerston North
- Taumarunui
- Taupō
- Wanganui

== Rohe ==
The electorate included the following rohe:

- Ngati Apa, Ngāti Rangitāne, Ngāti Raukawa - Feilding, Palmerston North & Wanganui
- Ngati Kahungunu - Hawke's Bay, Hastings, Napier and Wairarapa
- Ngati Maru, Ngati Mutanga, Ngati Tama - Taranaki
- Te Atiawa - Taranaki

== History ==
Te Puku O Te Whenua, or the belly of the land, was one of the five new Māori electorates created for the 1996 election with the introduction of mixed-member proportional (MMP) representation, and which were all won by the Tight Five of the New Zealand First from Labour. The 1996 election was won by Rana Waitai.

In the 1999 election it was substantially replaced by Ikaroa-Rāwhiti.

=== Members of Parliament ===
Key

NZ First Mauri Pacific ACT

Election	Winner
1996 election	Rana Waitai

=== List MPs ===
Election	Winner
1996 election	Donna Awatere Huata
