= Opinion polling for the 1996 New Zealand general election =

Opinion polling for elections

Opinion polling was commissioned throughout the duration of the 44th New Zealand Parliament in the lead up to the 1996 election by various research organisations.

== Graphical summary ==
Local regression of polls conducted

== Individual polls ==
Polls are listed in the table below in chronological order. Refusals are generally excluded from the party vote percentages, while question wording and the treatment of "don't know" responses and those not intending to vote may vary between survey firms.

Unless otherwise noted the information is sourced from here:

| Poll | Date (Note: These are the survey dates of the poll, or if the survey dates are not stated, the date the poll was released.) | Labour | National | Alliance | NZ First | ACT | United |
|---|---|---|---|---|---|---|---|
| 1993 election result | 6 Nov 1993 | 34.68 | 35.05 | 18.21 | 8.40 | – | – |
| TVNZ Heylen | 4 Dec 1993 | 25 | 35 | 27 | 10 | – | – |
| TVNZ Heylen | 19 Feb 1994 | 32 | 35 | 23 | 8 | – | – |
| TVNZ Heylen | 5 Mar 1994 | 32 | 32 | 27 | 7 | – | – |
| TVNZ Heylen | 26 Mar 1994 | 29 | 32 | 27 | 7 | – | – |
| TVNZ Heylen | 7 May 1994 | 30 | 34 | 24 | 8 | – | – |
| TVNZ Heylen | 28 May 1994 | 29 | 32 | 27 | 7 | – | – |
| TVNZ Heylen | 2 Jul 1994 | 29 | 36 | 24 | 8 | – | – |
| TVNZ Heylen | 30 Jul 1994 | 27 | 35 | 28 | 7 | – | – |
13 August 1994 – National narrowly wins the Selwyn by-election after Ruth Richardson's resignation.
| TVNZ Heylen | 3 Sep 1994 | 22 | 36 | 32 | 7 | – | – |
| TVNZ Heylen | 1 Oct 1994 | 24 | 35 | 29 | 8 | – | – |
| TVNZ Heylen | 29 Oct 1994 | 27 | 39 | 25 | 7 | – | – |
| TVNZ Heylen | 3 Dec 1994 | 28 | 40 | 22 | 6 | 2 | – |
| TVNZ Heylen | 9 May 1995 | 25 | 38 | 24 | 5 | 4 | – |
| One News Colmar Brunton | 15 Jun 1995 | 27 | 36 | 24 | 6 | 3 | – |
28 June 1995 – United New Zealand is formed by 4 former National MPs and 3 former Labour MPs.
| One News Colmar Brunton | 17 Jul 1995 | 24 | 42 | 20 | 5 | 2 | 2 |
| One News Colmar Brunton | 13 Aug 1995 | 23 | 42 | 20 | 5 | 2.9 | 0.7 |
| One News Colmar Brunton | 7 Sep 1995 | 24 | 46 | 17 | 5 | 1.9 | 0.3 |
| One News Colmar Brunton | 7 Oct 1995 | 16 | 49 | 21 | 4.5 | 2.9 | 0.8 |
| One News Colmar Brunton | 14 Nov 1995 | 20 | 45 | 22 | 5 | 2.1 | 1 |
| One News Colmar Brunton | 21 Feb 1996 | 20 | 44 | 22 | 8 | 1.3 | 0.8 |
| One News Colmar Brunton | 18 Mar 1996 | 17 | 42 | 16 | 17 | 3.8 | 1.3 |
April 1996 – Two former National MPs and one former Labour MP defected to New Zealand First.
| One News Colmar Brunton | 18 Apr 1996 | 18 | 40 | 11 | 22 | 4.1 | 0.5 |
| One News Colmar Brunton | 16 May 1996 | 15 | 35 | 11 | 29 | 3 | 0.3 |
27 May 1996 – Labour Party leader Helen Clark survived a leadership challenge with deputy leader David Caygill resigning soon after to be replaced with Michael Cullen.
| TV3 | 9 Jun 1996 | 16 | 43 | 7 | 28 | 2.4 | – |
| One News Colmar Brunton | 14 Jun 1996 | 16 | 41 | 9 | 25 | 1.8 | 0.6 |
| TV3 | 7 Jul 1996 | 16 | 41 | 12 | 24 | 2.7 | - |
| One News Colmar Brunton | 19 Jul 1996 | 19 | 43 | 10 | 20 | 3.2 | 0.2 |
| TV3 | 21 Jul 1996 | 19 | 43 | 13 | 20 | 1.2 | – |
| One News Colmar Brunton | 2 Aug 1996 | 15 | 40 | 13 | 21 | 2.5 | 0.4 |
| TV3 | 4 Aug 1996 | 19 | 42 | 9 | 21 | 3.2 | – |
| One News Colmar Brunton | 15 Aug 1996 | 14 | 39 | 13 | 20 | 4 | 0.3 |
| TV3 | 18 Aug 1996 | 20 | 37 | 14 | 17 | 3.4 | - |
| One News Colmar Brunton | 29 Aug 1996 | 19 | 35 | 12 | 20 | 4.6 | 0.6 |
| TV3 | 1 Sep 1996 | 21 | 38 | 12 | 18 | 2.4 | - |
| One News Colmar Brunton | 12 Sep 1996 | 16 | 35 | 15 | 19 | 4.3 | 0.7 |
| One News Colmar Brunton | 26 Sep 1996 | 18 | 40 | 15 | 14 | 5 | 0.4 |
| One News Colmar Brunton | 3 Oct 1996 | 24 | 34 | 15 | 15 | 3.8 | 0.5 |
| TV3 | 8 Oct 1996 | 26 | 30 | 17 | 16 | 6.4 | - |
| 1996 election result | 12 Oct 1996 | 28.19 | 33.87 | 10.10 | 13.35 | 6.10 | 0.88 |

== See also ==
- 1996 New Zealand general election
- Politics of New Zealand
