= Tau Henare =

Former New Zealand politician

The Honourable Tau Henare
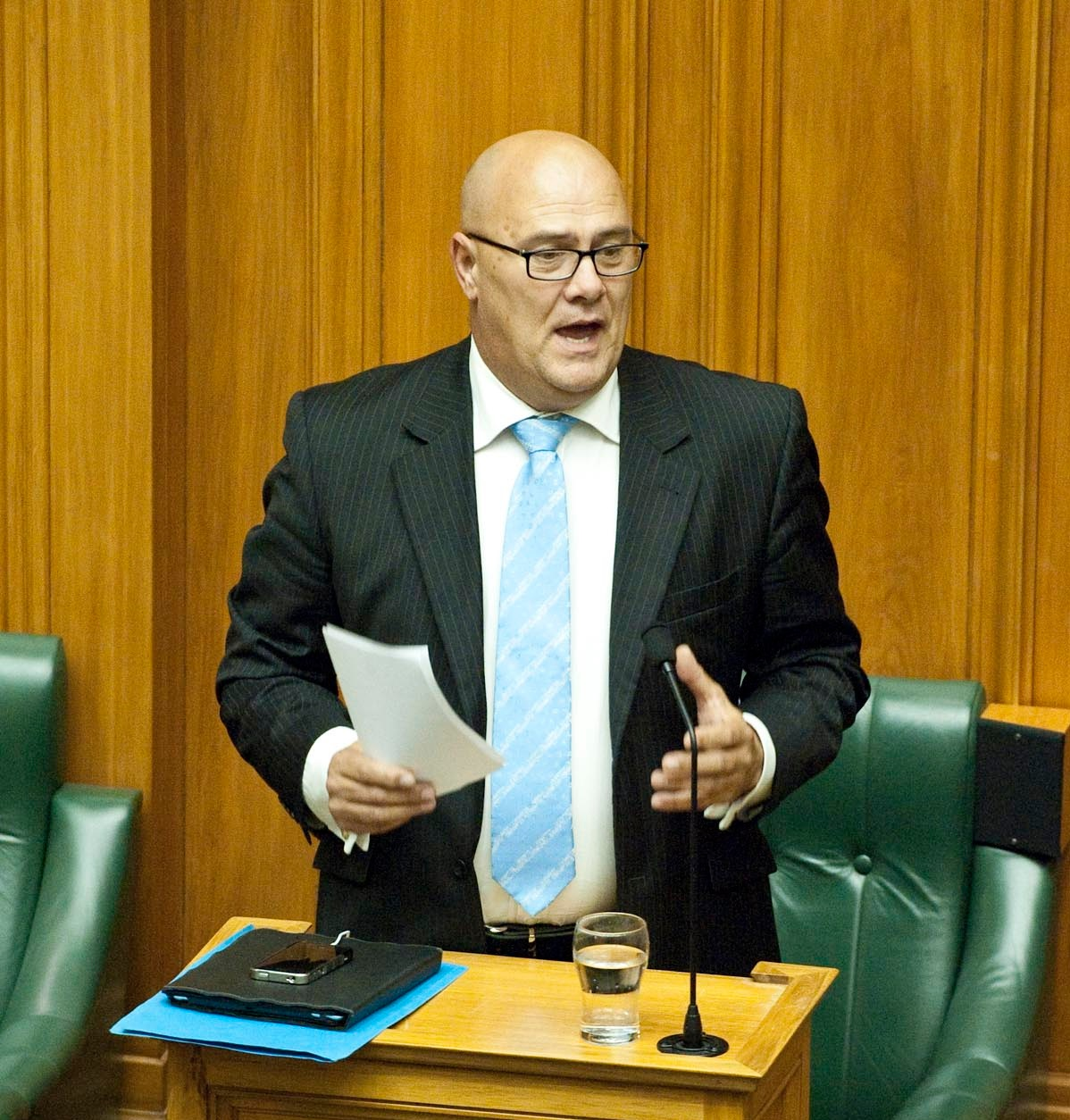
- Tau Henare in 2013

38th Minister of Māori Affairs
- In office 12 October 1996 – 10 December 1999
- Prime Minister: Jim Bolger; Jenny Shipley
- Preceded by: John Luxton
- Succeeded by: Dover Samuels

Member of the New Zealand Parliament for Northern Maori
- In office 1993–1996
- Preceded by: Bruce Gregory
- Succeeded by: constituency abolished

Member of the New Zealand Parliament for Te Tai Tokerau
- In office 1996–1999
- Preceded by: new constituency
- Succeeded by: Dover Samuels

1st Leader of Mauri Pacific
- In office 1998–1999

Member of the New Zealand Parliament for National Party list
- In office 17 September 2005 – 14 August 2014

Personal details
- Born: Raymond Tau Henare; 29 September 1960 (age 66) Ōtara, Auckland, New Zealand
- Party: New Zealand First (1993–1998); Mauri Pacific (1998–1999); National (2005–2014)
- Spouse: Ngaire Elisabeth Brown
- Relations: Taurekareka Hēnare (great grandfather); Sir James Henare (great-uncle); Peeni Henare (second cousin)
- Children: 5
- Occupation: politician
- Committees: Māori Affairs Committee (chairperson); Transport and Industrial Relations Committee; Auckland Governance Legislation Committee
- Website: Tauhenare on Twitter

Raymond Tau Henare (born 29 September 1960) is a former New Zealand Māori parliamentarian. In representing three different political parties in parliament—New Zealand First, Mauri Pacific and the National Party—Henare served as a Member of Parliament (MP) from 1993 to 1999 and from 2005 to 2014.

== Early life ==
Henare was born in Ōtara, New Zealand, the son of a 37-year railwayman, on 29 September 1960. Known by his middle name "Tau," Henare's tribal roots are Ngāpuhi and what he characterises as "all the North". His involvement in politics can be traced to his family's involvement in politics. Henare's great-grandfather, Taurekareka (Tau) Hēnare, served in Parliament from 1914 to 1938 alongside notable Māori politicians such as Āpirana Ngata, James Carroll and Māui Pōmare. Henare's great-uncle was Māori Battalion leader and politician Sir James Henare, who was once considered a candidate to be Governor-General and served as a revered guide and mentor to a young Tau. Henare himself was the brother-in-law to New Zealand Māori politician Tuku Morgan through Henare's marriage to the sister of Morgan's wife.

As a young boy growing up in Ōtara, Henare had a contrasting childhood. On one hand, he was told almost before he could walk that his future would be politics, which at times requires statesman-like skills to deal with others. On the other, Ōtara was "a place where you learn how to survive," and it required Henare to learn "to be strong, stand up and not take a backward step." Looking back on his 1960s childhood in 1996, Henare summed it up as one that "taught me to be proud of who I am." It also later contributed to what he describes as "youthful exuberance" that lead to a 1980s reputation for being a stirrer and a radical.

In Ōtara, Henare attended Sir Edmund Hillary Collegiate. During Year 11 (Form 5) when he was 16, he attained the School Certificate, a former New Zealand secondary school qualification for high school students to progress to Year 12. However, Henare was unsuccessful on his New Zealand University Entrance.

== Early career ==
After his schooling ended in 1978, Henare worked at a variety of positions, including wool cleaner and wool classer, where he was responsible for separating sheep's wool, organiser for the Northern Clerical Workers' Union under activist and trade unionist Syd Jackson, community worker, adviser to the Waitakere City Council, and Department of Internal Affairs adviser. During this period, Henare was unemployed for two years. Also, at the age of 25, Henare was arrested for breaking through a police line and laying a wreath for the Māori Battalion during a royal visit on Anzac Day in 1985.

In addition to being influenced by his upbringing and pre-Member of Parliament work, Henare was influenced during his 20s by Māori culture:

"I mostly remember how Māori culture comforted me and distracted me, the exhilaration of rowing a waka down the Waikato River with 100 others, the voluntary work at the local marae. Hitching to hui across the country and picking up the language along the way, meeting relations for the first time, changing our names."

In connection with Winston Peters (himself Māori) establishing the New Zealand First party in July 1993, Henare changed the focus of his activities to politics for the 6 November 1993 election.

== Member of Parliament ==
New Zealand Parliament
Years	Term	Electorate	List	Party
1993–1996	44th	Northern Maori		NZ First
1996–1998	45th	Te Tai Tokerau	2	NZ First
1998–1999	Changed allegiance to:			Mauri Pacific
2005–2008	48th	List	29	National
2008–2011	49th	List	26	National
2011–2014	50th	List	40	National

Henare first won election to Parliament in the 1993 election as the New Zealand First candidate for the Northern Maori electorate, a surprising result given Labour's traditional dominance in the Māori electorates. In defeating incumbent Labour Party member Bruce Gregory, Henare became New Zealand First's second MP, joining Peters in the House. As such, Henare became New Zealand First's deputy leader. His election helped counter the perception that New Zealand First was merely an extension of Peters.

In December 1994, Northern Maori member of parliament Henare supported Māori tribe's paramount chief Sir Hepi Te Heuheu in Heuheu's refusal to attend a meeting with then Prime Minister Jim Bolger for a roundtable discussion on government proposals to settle Māori claims, reasoning that the government's handling of Maori claims indicated a lack of understanding of the gravity of the issues involved and the meeting would be a public relations exercise. Two months later in February 1995, Henare supported a push to have the United Nations oversee a fiscal envelope negotiation process. by which a monetary cap of $1 billion would be placed in a "fiscal envelope" for use in settling all Treaty of Waitangi grievances. Henare felt that United Nations scrutiny would ensure justice in the face of past treaty breaches and that the Government's forceful approach did not create future resentment.

=== Minister of Māori Affairs ===
In the 1996 election, conducted under the new MMP electoral system, New Zealand First gained fifteen further MPs, and also made a clean sweep of the five Māori electorates. As deputy leader, Henare was second on New Zealand First's party list behind Peters. He easily won re-election in his electorate, which had been renamed Te Tai Tokerau. When New Zealand First went into coalition with National, allowing a third term of the fourth National government, Henare joined the Cabinet, with his most prominent ministry that of Māori Affairs. He and the four other New Zealand First Māori MPs — Tuku Morgan, Rana Waitai, Tu Wyllie and Tuariki Delamere — became known as the Tight Five, an allusion to the five tight forwards in a rugby union team.

=== Mauri Pacific ===
National and New Zealand First initially worked very well together, but relations became more strained after Jenny Shipley ousted Jim Bolger as National leader and Prime Minister in 1997. In August 1998, the coalition started to become unstable, and internal tensions arose within New Zealand First itself. When Shipley sacked Peters from Cabinet on 14 August 1998, Peters pulled New Zealand First out of the coalition. However, Henare and several other New Zealand First MPs left the party to sit as independents. They offered their support to National, allowing the government to maintain a slim majority. It later emerged that before departing, Henare had mounted an unsuccessful challenge to Peters. Later in 1998, he banded together with four other MPs who had departed New Zealand First (including two other members of the Tight Five, Morgan and Waitai), to form a new party, Mauri Pacific, with himself as the new party's leader. Late in the term, he was criticised for refusing to give Trevor Mallard a chance to speak on the use of the Māori language in Parliament because Mallard is not Māori.

In the 1999 election, Henare finished a distant third in his electorate and Mauri Pacific only gained 0.08% of the vote, forcing Mauri Pacific out of Parliament.

=== National Party ===
In the 2002 election, after Mauri Pacific's dissolution, Henare stood as a candidate for the National Party. He contested the Te Atatū electorate, and was ranked thirty-fifth on National's list. On election day, Henare finished second in Te Atatū, and National did not win enough votes for Henare to return to Parliament as a list MP.

In the 2005 election, Henare stood again as a National candidate, again contesting Te Atatū and holding the 29th slot on the party list. He expressed agreement with the controversial Orewa speech on race relations made by National Party leader Don Brash. Henare almost doubled his vote from the 2002 election result but still finished a distant second in Te Atatū. However, National's gains in the election were enough to return him to Parliament as a list MP. With the National Party in opposition, Henare was a member of the Māori Affairs select committee, an associate spokesperson for Treaty of Waitangi negotiations and early childhood education under Brash, and a spokesperson for Māori affairs under John Key. In October 2007, Henare had an altercation with Labour Party MP Trevor Mallard outside the debating chamber in Parliament House; Mallard was later convicted of fighting in a public place.

In 2008, Henare contested Te Atatū; again, he finished second and was returned as a list MP. The National Party formed a government but Henare was not appointed as a Minister; instead, he was named chairperson of the Māori affairs select committee. In 2009, Henare was additionally appointed deputy chairperson of the select committee considering legislative changes following the Royal Commission on Auckland Governance. In August 2009, it emerged that Henare had sent an email to his colleagues lobbying for the right to vote against part of the Auckland governance legislation, in particular the part that denied separate Māori seats on the new Auckland Council which had been promoted by the ACT Party. In response to reaction to the email, Henare made a number of challenging remarks about Māori Party co-leader Pita Sharples. Ultimately, no separate Māori seats were established. In February 2010, Henare's Employment Relations (Workers' Secret Ballot for Strikes) Amendment Bill was drawn from the member's ballot. The bill was enacted in May 2012.

In 2011, Henare contested Te Atatū to come in second and be returned as a list MP. He was reappointed to the chair of the Māori affairs committee. In March 2012, Henare married Ngaire Brown, his long-term partner, in a Parliament select committee room. The wedding celebrant was fellow MP Chris Auchinvole, Paula Bennett spoke, and Parekura Horomia gave the mihi (formal speech). In addition to his public office, Henare held positions as a talkback host on Newstalk ZB, an early childhood education consultant, a trustee on the Kura Kaupapa board and the Rutherford College board, and chairman of Tu Tangata education provider.

In late 2012 Henare was looking to succeed Lockwood Smith as Speaker, but dropped his bid when he lost the backing of the Māori Party. The Māori Party said they were not responsible for the failure of his bid, they were simply canvassing whether it was likely he would be appointed Speaker, and that ultimately they believed that Henare did not have the support.

In April 2014, Henare announced his intention to retire from politics at the 2014 general election, influenced by an expected low list placing.

== Parliamentary roles ==
- Minister of Racing 16 December 1996 – 30 August 1998
- Associate Minister for Sport, Fitness and Leisure 16 December 1996 – 2 August 1998
- Minister of Māori Affairs 16 December 1996 – 10 December 1999
- Associate Minister of Corrections 31 August 1998 – 10 December 1999
- Associate Minister of Education 31 August 1998 – 10 December 1999
- Associate Minister of Tertiary Education 21 June 1999 – 10 December 1999
- Associate Spokesperson, Treaty of Waitangi Issues and Māori Affairs (Treaty Negotiations) 26 October 2005 – 1 December 2006
- Associate Spokesperson, Education (Early Childhood) 26 October 2005 – 1 December 2006

== After parliament ==
Henare appeared in Henderson District Court in December 2014 charged with knowingly breaching suppression orders under the Criminal Procedure Act. The charge related to an alleged posting on social media in 2014 of the name of the defendant in the Queenstown suppressed indecency case, when the defendant's identity was subject to a suppression order.

In 2015, Henare was appointed to the board of Housing New Zealand. In 2016, he was appointed to Auckland Council's Independent Māori Statutory Board (IMSB); in 2019, he was named deputy chair of that board.

New Zealand Parliament
Preceded by Bruce Gregory	Member of Parliament for Northern Maori; 1993–1996	Constituency abolished
New constituency	Member of Parliament for Te Tai Tokerau; 1996–1999	Succeeded by Dover Samuels
Political offices
Preceded by John Luxton	Minister of Māori Affairs; 1996–1999	Succeeded by Dover Samuels
Party political offices
New political party	Deputy leader of New Zealand First; 1993–1998	Succeeded by Peter Brown
New political party	Leader of the Mauri Pacific Party; 1998–1999	Party disbanded
