= Tuku Morgan =

New Zealand politician (born 1957)

Tukoroirangi Morgan
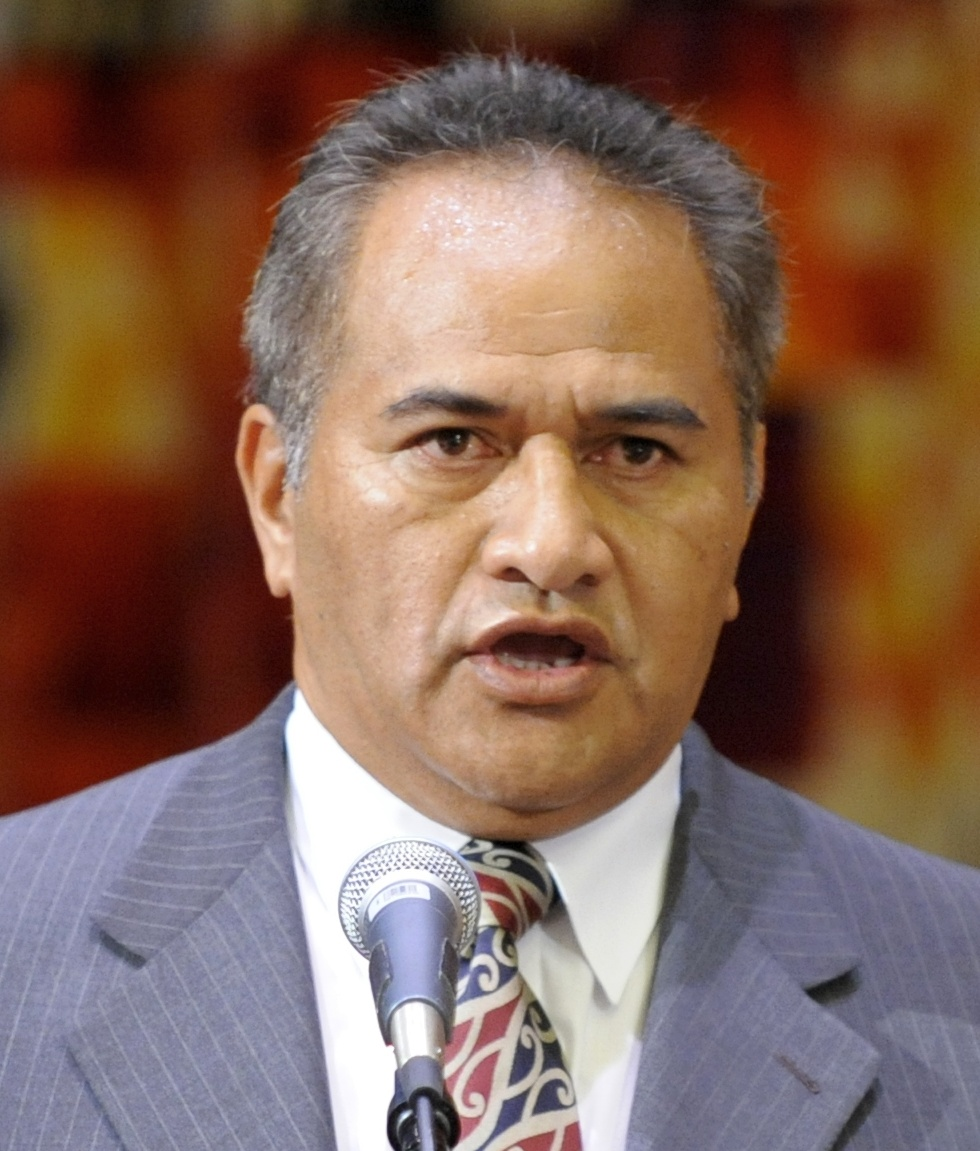
- Tukoroirangi Morgan in 2009

Member of the New Zealand Parliament for Te Tai Hauāuru
- In office 1996–1999
- Preceded by: New constituency
- Succeeded by: Nanaia Mahuta

4th President of the Māori Party
- In office 16 Jul 2016 – 11 December 2017
- Preceded by: Naida Glavish
- Succeeded by: Che Wilson

Personal details
- Born: Tukuroirangi Morgan; 7 October 1957 (age 69) Auckland, New Zealand
- Party: Māori Party
- Other political affiliations: New Zealand First; Mauri Pacific

Tukoroirangi "Tuku" Morgan (born 7 October 1957) is a New Zealand Māori politician and former broadcaster.

Morgan has been a prominent political figure since the 1990s. Since 2022, he has served as the chair of Te Arataura, which is the executive board of Te Whakakitenga, the governing council of the Waikato Tainui tribal confederation. He previously chaired Te Arataura from 2006 until 2012 and is a former advisor to Kingi Tuheitia.

Morgan was a Member of Parliament (MP) in the New Zealand House of Representatives from 1996 to 1999 for New Zealand First and Mauri Pacific. He was the president of the Maori Party from 2016 to 2017.

== Early life and family ==
Born in Auckland on 7 October 1957, Morgan affiliates to the Tainui iwi confederation. He was raised under whāngai adoption by his grandparents at Waahi marae in Huntly. The household spoke te reo Māori as their first language and Morgan once stated the only time English was spoken was when he would read aloud from the newspaper to his grandfather. His grandparents were close to the kingitanga and did not have formal employment; the only income the family received was a family benefit.

Morgan was educated at St Stephen's School, Bombay from 1970 to 1971, and Huntly College from 1971 to 1976. He then gained a Diploma of Teaching from Epsom Teachers' College and taught English and Māori studies at Huntly College from 1980 to 1982, then at Birkdale College (1982). In the 1980s, Morgan attended a Māori land protest where he was convicted of obstructing a police officer and ordered to do community service.

Morgan married Carolyn Brown (Ngāti Porou), whom he met at teachers' college. They share three children. Morgan's brother-in-law is Tau Henare (their wives are sisters).

== Broadcasting career ==
In 1984, Morgan was hired as one of the first reporters on Te Karere, New Zealand's first Māori-language news programme which was broadcast by Television New Zealand. He then moved to rival broadcaster TV3 as a mainstream news reporter. He briefly worked outside of the media, as manager of the Tainui Health Authority, Raukura Hauora o Tainui.

Later, he was involved in the establishment of the short-lived Aotearoa Television Network, New Zealand's first Māori-language broadcaster, which began operations in 1996. Morgan was the network's head of sport, youth and current affairs programmes and also a news presenter.

== Member of Parliament ==
New Zealand Parliament
| Years | Term | Electorate | List | Party |
|---|---|---|---|---|
| 1996–1998 | 45th | Te Tai Hauāuru | 10 | NZ First |
| 1998–1999 | Changed allegiance to: | | | Mauri Pacific |

Morgan was elected to Parliament in the 1996 election as the New Zealand First MP for Te Tai Hauāuru. New Zealand First captured all five Māori electorates in the 1996 election (including Te Tai Hauāuru). Morgan and the other four Māori electorate MPs became known as the Tight Five.

After the election, New Zealand First formed a coalition government with the National Party. Morgan had reportedly preferred New Zealand First to work with Labour. He was not given a ministerial role in the government and was appointed a member of the Māori affairs and the health committee. He had been expected to be the government's nominee to chair the Māori affairs committee, but withdrew his nomination because of a controversy early in the term.

In February 1997, it emerged that two weeks before the general election, Morgan had spent $4,000 of Aotearoa Television funds on clothes including an $89 pair of Hugo Boss underpants, among other alleged financial misuse by the company's directors. Morgan stated the spending was from a clothing budget for on-air presenters; however, he was no longer in an on-air role with the network at the time the spending was made. The expenditure was controversial because the Māori affairs minister, Morgan's brother-in-law Tau Henare, had announced $4 million of new government funding for the network the month prior (the provision of which was later withdrawn). In a special debate in Parliament on 18 February, calls were made for Morgan to resign from Parliament, including by Alliance MP Sandra Lee who criticised Morgan for "endanger[ing] the aspirations of Māori." Morgan refused to resign. In his maiden speech, delivered on 25 February 1997, he addressed the controversy, saying he "would never be caught with his pants down again."

Morgan sponsored two member's bills which were debated in Parliament. He inherited the Taonga Maori Protection Bill from Henare in 1996 and it was debated in 1998. The bill proposed establishing a national trust for the purposes of protecting and repatriating taonga. The bill was considered and endorsed by the Māori affairs committee and approved for continuation by Parliament in a 111-7 vote on 1 September 1999. The bill was adopted by the subsequent Labour government after the 1999 election and eventually discharged in 2004. Morgan also promoted the Smoke-free Environments (Enhanced Protection) Amendment Bill in July 1999, which was transferred to Steve Chadwick after the election.

The coalition government broke down in August 1998. Morgan resigned from New Zealand First on 18 August 1998, becoming an independent MP. He later joined the newly formed Mauri Pacific. In the 1999 election, Morgan was ranked second on Mauri Pacific's party list. He contested the Te Tai Hauāuru seat again, but was not returned to Parliament. He then returned to television and film production and also opened an art shop on Ponsonby Road.

== Life after parliament ==
Morgan was chair of Te Arataura, the Waikato-Tainui executive board, from 2003 to 2004, when he was removed from office because of a criminal conviction for obstructing police during a protest march in the 1980s. He returned after a rule change in 2006 and held that role until 2012. He was also appointed to a two-year term as a director of Auckland Council Property, a council-controlled organisation of the Auckland Council from 2010.

In 2015 he became the Māori Party's co-chair of the Hauraki-Waikato electorate. In July 2016 he was elected as president of the Māori Party. As president, he set the party's goal of winning all seven Māori electorates at the 2017 general election. In the event, the party lost all seven electorates to Labour and was not eligible to return to Parliament. Morgan resigned in December 2017 and called for the party's co-leaders to follow suit.

In August 2018, he published an open letter to the Māori King Tūheitia Paki, whose advisor he had previously been, detailing a number of criticisms of Paki's behaving, including his continued support and employment of Rangi Whakaruru as chief of staff. He rejoined the Te Arataura board in 2021 and regained the chair in 2022.

New Zealand Parliament
| New constituency | Member of Parliament for Te Tai Hauāuru; 1996–1999 | Succeeded by Nanaia Mahuta |
