= Patricia Schnauer =

New Zealand politician

Patricia Schnauer (born 1942) is a former New Zealand politician and lawyer. She was an MP from 1996 to 1999, representing the ACT New Zealand party. After resigning as MP shortly before the 1999 election, she rejoined the New Zealand National Party in 2000.

== Early years ==
Before entering politics, she was a lawyer specialising in matrimonial property and family law, and after leaving Parliament, she rejoined her family law practice, Schnauer and Co.

== Member of Parliament ==
New Zealand Parliament
Years	Term	Electorate	List	Party
1996–1999	45th	List	5	ACT

She was first elected to Parliament in the 1996 election, becoming a list MP and serving as her party's spokesperson on justice. At the 1999 election, however, she chose to leave politics, and did not stand for re-election.
