= Ann Batten =

New Zealand politician

The Reverend Ann Batten

Member of the New Zealand Parliament for List
- In office 1996–1999

Personal details
- Born: 27 April 1944 (age 82)
- Party: New Zealand First; Mauri Pacific
- Other political affiliations: Labour (1981–96)
- Children: 1
- Profession: Priest

Ann Batten (born 27 April 1944) is an Anglican priest, peace activist and a former New Zealand politician. She has been a member of various political parties and represented New Zealand First and Mauri Pacific in Parliament.

== Biography ==
Batten is originally from South Auckland. In 1995, she headed an anti-nuclear protest to French Polynesia. Prior to entering parliament, she studied theology at St. Johns Theological College in Auckland and gained a Licentiate in Theology, Community Studies Certificate at Auckland University.

Community Organisations: Was a La Leche League NZ Leader, Mastectomy Association founding member, Trustee South Auckland HELP Foundation, Patron Bruce Mason Theatre, Teacher of personal development at the Manukau Technical Institute Nursing school, an Alcoholism therapist at the Salvation Army Bridge Programme, She led the Women's Peace Flight to Tahiti against the French Nuclear Testing in the Pacific and was part of an International Peacekeeping delegation to draw attention to the plight of the East Timor people in 1995. Former Member of Management of Trees for Survival organisation, Spokesperson for former Manukau Asbestos Action Group,

Business: Member of the Forest Owners Association, A co-director with her husband of their land development company. Member of Institute of Directors, Former Mentor for "Business in the Community" now under the Auckland Chamber of Commerce.

Church involvement: Has been Priest-in-Charge at Otara Mission district, Albany/Greenhithe, Waiuku and Pukekohe. Currently holds a Bishop's Licence to Officiate and offices at St. John's Church, East Tamaki. She was a co-founder of the Anglican Diocesan Women's Resource Centre, a member of the Diocesan Social Justice Committee, Anti Racism trainer with the Anglican Church and Co-Convenor of the Auckland Anglican Bishop's Diocesan Treaty of Waitangi Education Committee. Convened a Working Group to provide input to the Anglican Church's Prayer Book Commission which rewrote the Church's prayerbook to reflect modern and inclusive language.

Club Memberships: Auckland Club and The Northern Club. Former Benefactor NBR Opera

Television: Ann financed, produced and presented the Television programme, Ann Batten's Auckland in Focus for 3 1/2 years on Triangle Television (now Face TV).

== Member of Parliament ==
New Zealand Parliament
Years	Term	Electorate	List	Party
1996–1998	45th	List	3	NZ First
1998–1999	Changed allegiance to:			Mauri Pacific

Batten was a supporter of the Labour Party and unsuccessfully stood in the Clevedon and Glenfield electorates in the 1990 and 1993 elections. She was then selected by the Labour Party to contest the Albany electorate in the 1996 election. She resigned from the Labour Party in March 1996 and joined New Zealand First, which gave her a high list ranking of 3rd place and let her contest the North Shore electorate. She came fifth in the electorate vote, but was one of 11 list candidates of her party who entered Parliament.

In 1998, when New Zealand First splintered, Batten was one of the eight MPs who stayed with the Coalition Government which Winston Peters left. She eventually joined with four other MPs to form the Mauri Pacific party. In the 1999 election, she was ranked fifth on Mauri Pacific's list, but the party failed to win any seats.

Since leaving Parliament, Batten has been involved in broadcasting.
