= Shane Frith =

New Zealand politician and political activist

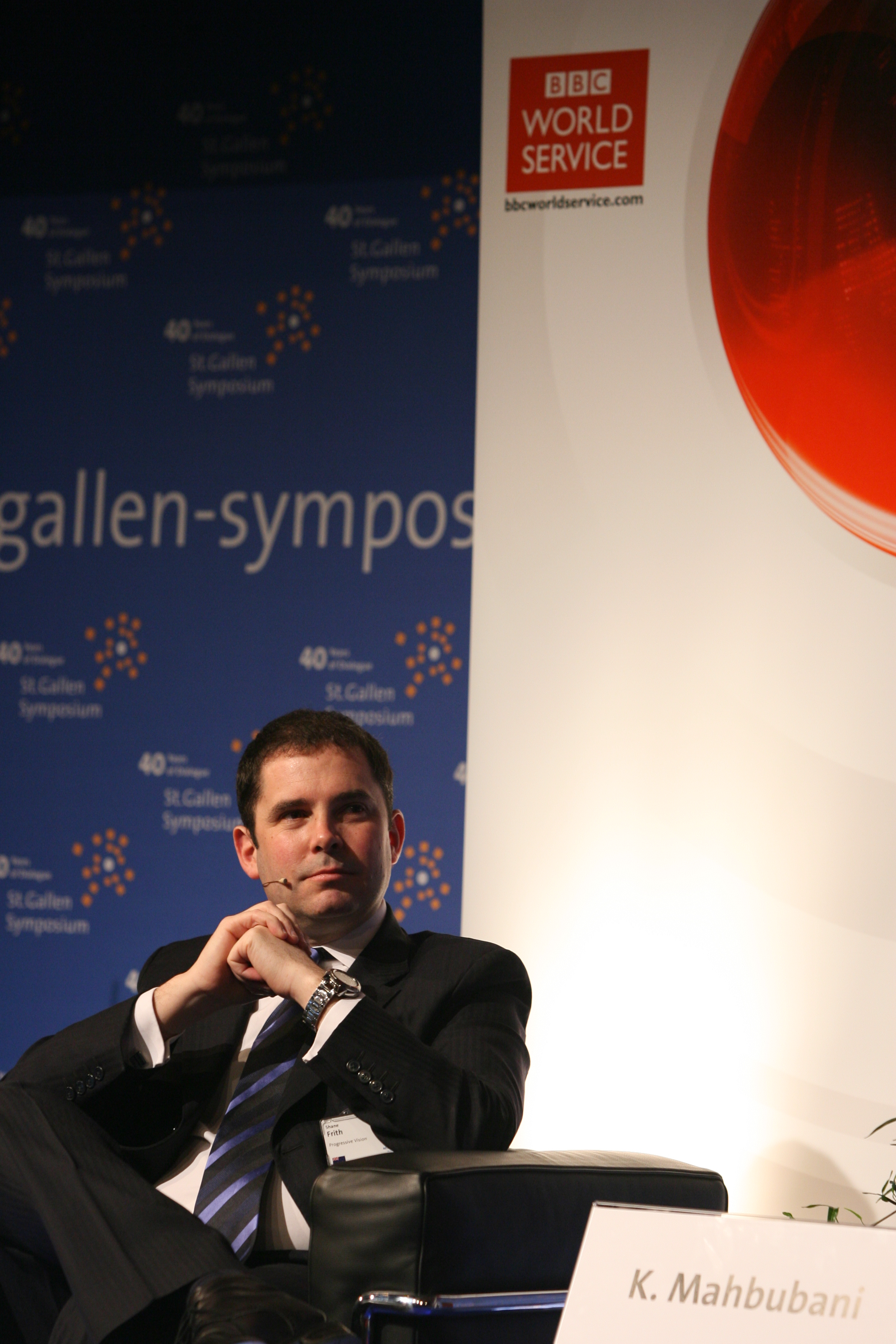
Image of Shane Frith

Shane Frith is a New Zealand politician and political activist. He is director of the Brussels-based think tank New Direction. He was director of Progressive Vision, a classical liberal think tank in London, and managing director of the Stockholm Network, an international network of classical liberal think tanks.

In his native New Zealand, Frith was president of the Young Nationals from 1991 to 1995. Firth contested the Otara electorate in 1993. In 1996, he ran for Parliament in Auckland Central for the National Party in the 1996 general election, finishing third, behind Judith Tizard and Sandra Lee-Vercoe. Frith was chairman of the International Young Democrat Union from 2002 to 2004.
