= Nga Iwi Morehu Movement =

The Nga Iwi Morehu Movement was a New Zealand Māori political party. Its name literally translates as "the surviving people" or "the remnant people". It contested the 1996 election as an unregistered party, running a single candidate and gaining 194 votes. It ran two candidates in the 2002 election, winning 522 votes. In the 1999 election, members of Nga Iwi Morehu stood under the banner of the Freedom Movement.

In September 2011 it applied to register its logo, which is a five-point star, with the Electoral Commission. The application was declined on the grounds that, in the opinion of the Electoral Commission, the logo could mislead voters into believing that the party was backed by the Rātana Church.

The party stood two electorate candidates in the 2011 election under the label "Nga Iwi" — Te Ariki Karamaene in Hauraki-Waikato and Jennifer Waitai-Rapana in Te Tai Hauāuru. It did not stand any candidates at the 2014 election.
