= Tight Five =

Group of five Māori members of the New Zealand Parliament

Tau Henare

New Zealand Parliament
Years	Term	Electorate	List	Party
1993–96	44th	Northern Maori		NZ First
1996–98	45th	Te Tai Tokerau	2	NZ First
1998–99	Changed allegiance to:			Mauri Pacific
2005–08	48th	List	29	National
2008–11	49th	List	26	National
2011–14	50th	List	40	National

Tuariki Delamere

New Zealand Parliament
Years	Term	Electorate	List	Party
1996–1998	45th	Te Tai Rawhiti	18	NZ First
1998–1999	Changed allegiance to:			Te Tawharau

Tuku Morgan

New Zealand Parliament
Years	Term	Electorate	List	Party
1996–98	45th	Te Tai Hauāuru	10	NZ First
1998–99	Changed allegiance to:			Mauri Pacific

Rana Waitai

New Zealand Parliament
Years	Term	Electorate	List	Party
1996–98	45th	Te Puku O Te Whenua	27	NZ First
1998–99	Changed allegiance to:			Mauri Pacific

Tu Wyllie

New Zealand Parliament
Years	Term	Electorate	List	Party
1996–1999	45th	Te Tai Tonga	36	NZ First

The Tight Five was a nickname given to the five Māori MPs elected to the New Zealand Parliament in 1996 from the centrist/populist New Zealand First party.

== Formation ==
New Zealand First had been founded in 1993 by Winston Peters, a former National Party Minister of Māori Affairs. In that year's election, Tau Henare, great-grandson of legendary Māori politician Taurekareka Henare, won the Northern Maori seat, one of four Māori electorates, and became New Zealand First's second MP, along with Peters. This victory broke a long Labour hold on the Māori electorates. Soon after the election, Peters named Henare as deputy leader of New Zealand First.

The party was the biggest beneficiary of New Zealand's switch to mixed member proportional representation. In the 1996 elections, New Zealand First won 17 seats, including 6 electorate seats and swept all five Māori electorates. Henare was reelected in Te Tai Tokerau (the former Northern Maori). He was joined by Rana Waitai in Te Puku O Te Whenua, Tuku Morgan in Te Tai Hauāuru, Tuariki Delamere in Te Tai Rawhiti, and Tu Wyllie in Te Tai Tonga. When New Zealand First entered in a coalition government with the National Party, Peters served as deputy Prime Minister, and Henare and Delamere joined Peters in Cabinet. Henare served as Minister of Māori Affairs and Delamere as Minister of Immigration and Pacific Affairs.

The five Māori electorate MPs soon became known as the "Tight Five," named after the five rugby forwards who do most of the pushing in a scrum. Largely because of their huge electoral upset, they gained a very high profile in both New Zealand First and nationwide. However, they along with many other New Zealand First MPs attracted some controversy for their behavior. Morgan, in particular, faced criticism for reportedly misappropriating funds from a television network where he worked before entering Parliament.

== Disbandment ==
In December 1997, National's Jim Bolger was ousted as Prime Minister in a party room coup by Jenny Shipley. Tensions rapidly developed between the coalition partners and within New Zealand First itself. In 1998, Henare staged an unsuccessful party room coup of his own against Peters. Soon afterwards, Shipley sacked Peters from Cabinet. Peters immediately pulled New Zealand First out of the coalition, but eight New Zealand First MPs left the party instead and continued to support the National Government as independent MPs. Among these MPs were all of the Tight Five except Wyllie.

Henare, Waitai and Morgan eventually founded a new party, Mauri Pacific, led by Henare. Delamere remained an independent prior to the 1999 election, when he joined Te Tawharau, a small Māori party allied with the Mana Māori Movement.

In the 1999 election, all of the Tight Five were defeated, with only Delamere managing to even finish second. Henare is the only one who returned to parliament, joining the National Party and serving as a list MP from 2005 to 2014. Waitai and Delamere have also rejoined the National Party since leaving Parliament. Waitai was elected to the Wanganui District Council in 2007. Morgan became Māori co-chair for the Hauraki-Waikato electorate in 2015. In July 2016, he was elected president of the Māori Party. In December 2017, he resigned after the 2017 general election.

== Other uses of the term ==
In 2020, five Labour Māori MPs were awarded ministerial positions inside Cabinet, and journalist Joel Maxwell referred to them as "Tight Five Two" and as a "Labour Tight Five".
