= Green Society =

- Leader: Hans Grueber, Simon Reeves
- Founded: 1994
- Dissolved: February 2001
- Ideology: Environmentalism
- Colors: Green

The Green Society was a small New Zealand political party dedicated to environmentalism. It was established in the spring of 1994 by former members of the Green Party, including Hans Grueber, Chris Marshall, and Peter Whitmore. They opposed the decision by the Green Party to become part of the Alliance, a broad left-wing coalition – they stated that this "abandoned a long tradition of being an independent green political force", diluting the group's pure environmental focus. At the same time, they were critical of another Green Party off-shoot, the Progressive Green Party, for being too close to the right and therefore not independent either. The Green Society described itself as the only truly "green" party in the New Zealand political environment.

In its manifesto, the Green Society described itself as "the party caring for your earth and her people", and its policies emphasised environmental protection, personal autonomy, and self-reliance. Political commentator Bryce Edwards described them as representing a "lifestyler" and "hippie" branch of the green movement, contrasting with a left-wing activist branch (the Green Party) and a pragmatic centrist branch (the Progressive Green Party). Colin James, another political journalist, characterised the group which gave rise to the Green Society as having an "almost mystic", holistic approach to environmentalism, valuing a spiritual or intuitive relationship with nature rather than scientific one.

In the 1996 election, the Green Society's top-ranked candidate was Simon Reeves, an environmental lawyer who also contested the Auckland Central electorate. The party contested eight electorates as well as the party list, but gained only 1,140 electorate and 2,363 list votes (0.11%), failing to win any seats.

The party did not contest the 1999 election and was deregistered in February 2001.
