= Rana Waitai =

New Zealand politician (1942–2021)

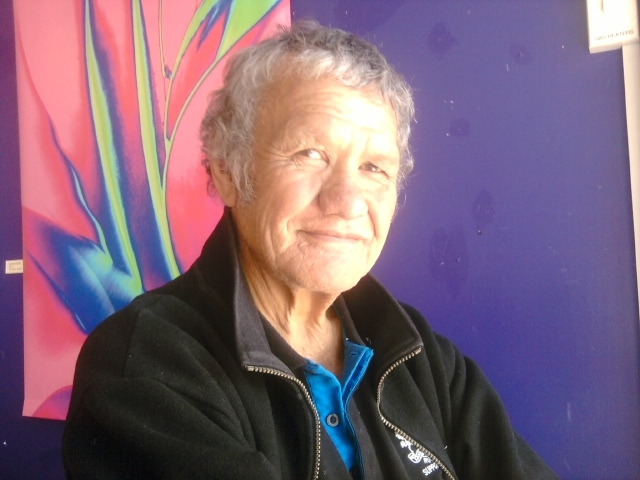
- Waitai in Whanganui 2016

Member of the New Zealand Parliament for Te Puku O Te Whenua
- In office 1996–1999
- Majority: 2,386 (30.69%)

Personal details
- Born: Rana Donald Waitai; 26 November 1942 Wanganui, New Zealand
- Died: 8 May 2021 (aged 78) Whanganui, New Zealand
- Party: National (1973–1992, 2000–?); NZ First (1993–1998); Mauri Pacific (1998–1999)
- Domestic partner: Te Aroha Ann Ruru Stanton (separated)
- Children: 4

Rana Donald Waitai (26 November 1942 – 8 May 2021) was a New Zealand politician and lawyer. He was a member of the New Zealand House of Representatives representing Te Puku o Te Whenua, for the New Zealand First Party and Mauri Pacific Party from 1996 to 1999. He later served as a member of the Wanganui District Council.

== Early years ==
His father was Te Rangi Koroingo Te Oreore Waitai (August 1912 – 1989) born and died in Lower Hutt. His mother was Mavis Lillian Waitai (née Winduss) (May 1912 – 1997) born in Nelson and died in Lower Hutt.

Rana Waitai was the partner of Te Aroha Ann Ruru Stanton from 1966 to 1995 and they had four daughters.

== Career ==
Following his secondary schooling at Wanganui Technical College, (now Whanganui City College), Waitai was a freezing worker at Wanganui in 1961, a bushman in 1961 at Karioi and also a factory worker. He later became a trainee probation officer at Wellington and in 1965 joined the New Zealand Police. In 1979 Waitai was the Duty Inspector at Police National Headquarters when Air New Zealand Flight 901 crashed on Erebus. He rang Chief Superintendent Brian Davies who was at home in the evening: "We seem to have a small problem.... We have lost a DC-10 sir." He retired from the Police at the rank of Superintendent after 31 years when he was elected to Parliament.

After leaving Parliament Waitai trained as a lawyer and worked as a barrister and solicitor in Whanganui.

== Political career ==
Waitai was involved in the New Zealand National Party between 1973 and 1992, quitting after a dispute with then Prime Minister, Jim Bolger. He rejoined the National Party in 2000.

In 1992 he stood for Mayor of Wellington, despite living in Gisborne. He campaigned on improving public safety, scaling back sewage infrastructure to save on costs, promoting inner city living and giving jobs to unemployed people to convert unused office space into accommodation. He finished seventh out of eleven candidates.

=== Member of Parliament ===
New Zealand Parliament
Years	Term	Electorate	List	Party
1996–1998	45th	Te Puku O Te Whenua	27	NZ First
1998–1999	Changed allegiance to:			Mauri Pacific

Waitai was first elected to Parliament in the 1996 election as New Zealand First MP for the Māori electorate of Te Puku O Te Whenua as one of the Tight Five, having previously stood for the Gisborne seat. In 1998, when New Zealand First splintered, Waitai was one of the eight MPs who left the party. He eventually joined with four other MPs to form the Mauri Pacific party. In the 1999 election, he stood in the Ikaroa-Rāwhiti electorate and was ranked fourth on Mauri Pacific's list, but the party failed to win any seats.

=== Local government ===
In 2005, Waitai attempted to re-enter politics as a by-election candidate for the Wanganui District Council. Although soundly defeated at that attempt, he subsequently was successful in the 2007 New Zealand local elections and was elected to both the district council and the Whanganui district health board. He was deputy chairman of the council's Harbour and Maori committees. He was not successful in gaining re-election to the council in 2010, 2013 or 2014.

== Death ==
Waitai died in Whanganui on 8 May 2021.

New Zealand Parliament
New constituency	Member of Parliament for Te Puku O Te Whenua; 1996–1999	Constituency abolished Stood for Ikaroa-Rawhiti
