= 1996 New Zealand general election =

- 12 October 1996

All 120 seats in the House of Representatives 61 seats needed for a majority
- Opinion polls
- Registered: 2,418,587
- Turnout: 2,135,175; 88.28% (▲5.46%)
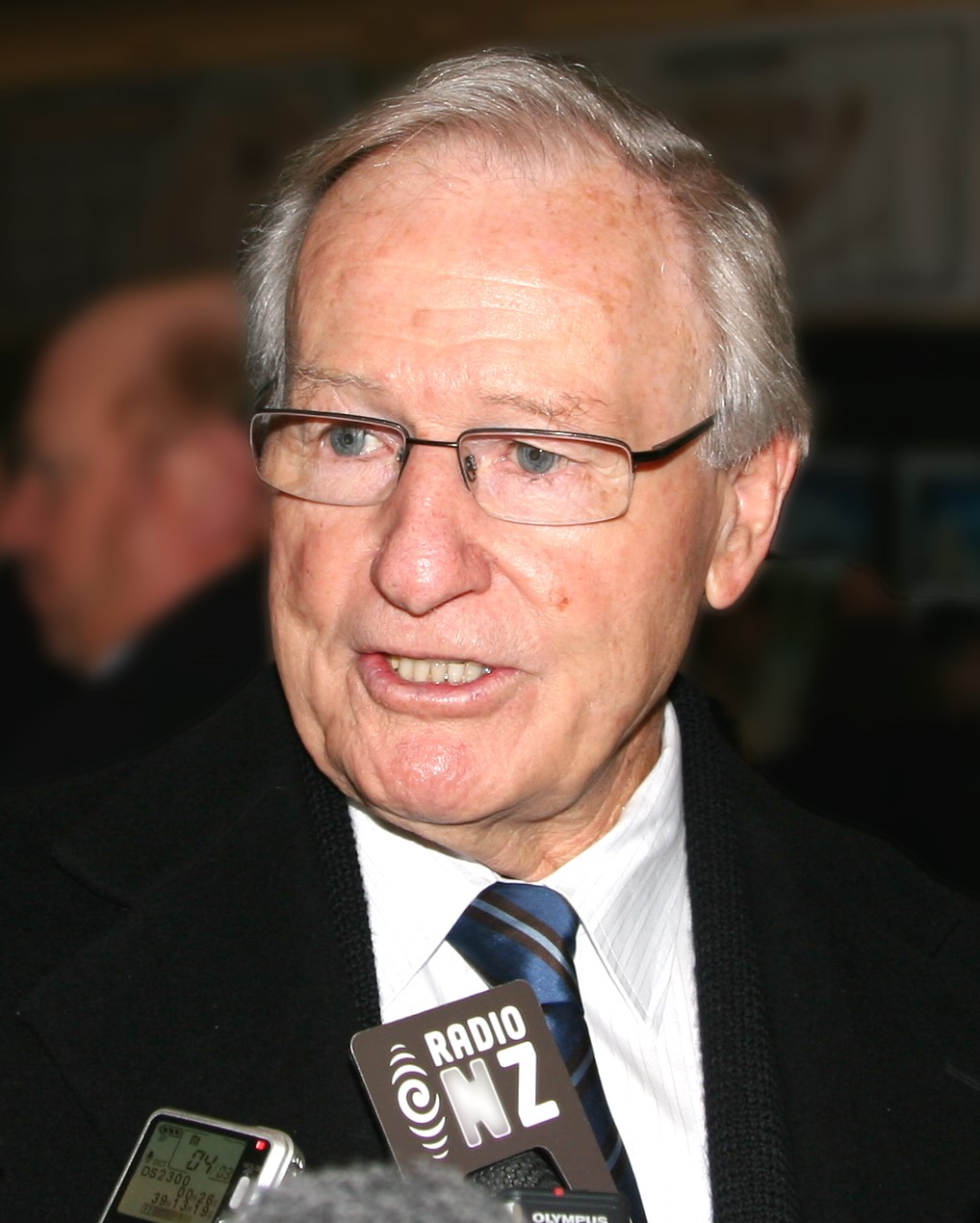

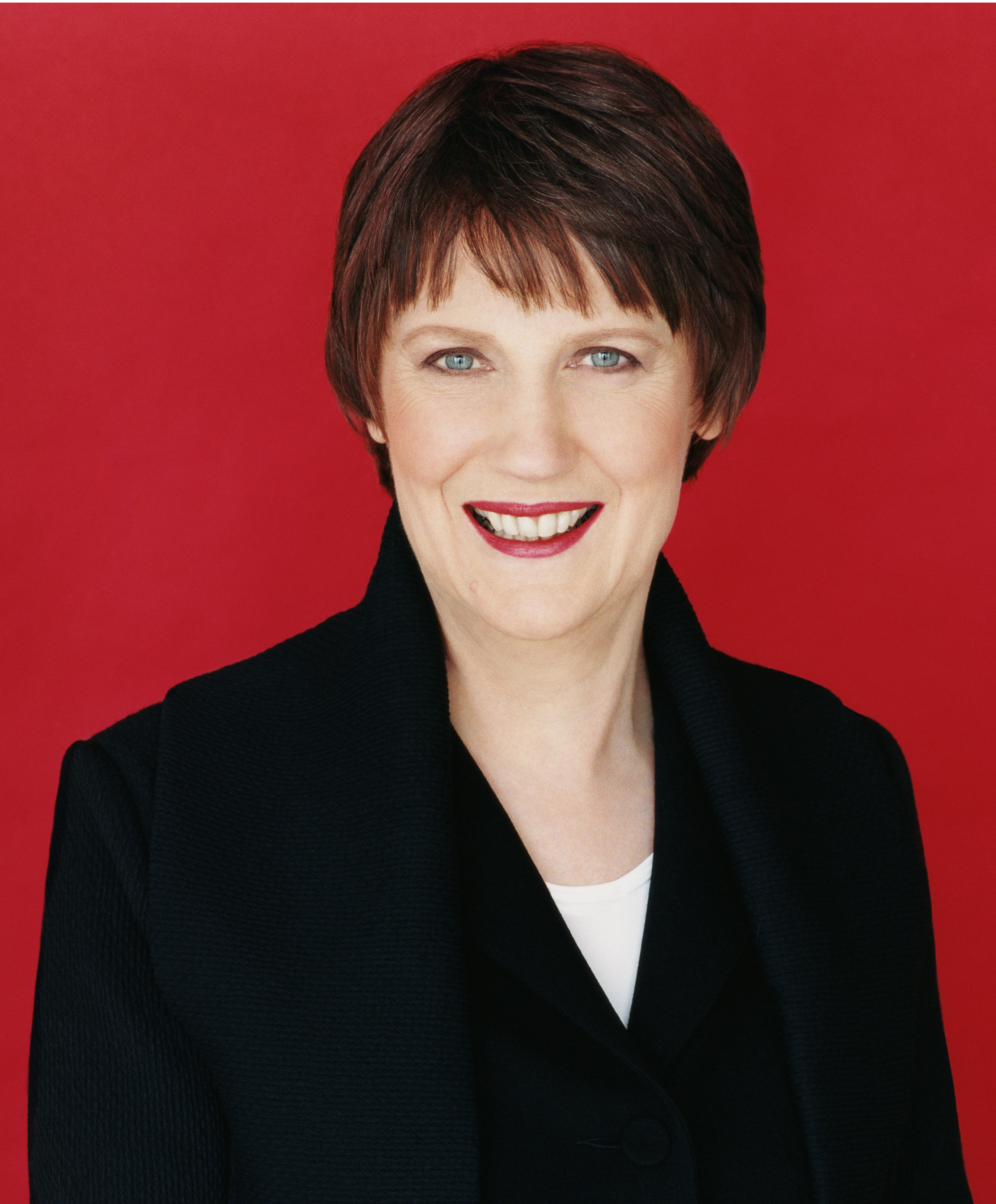

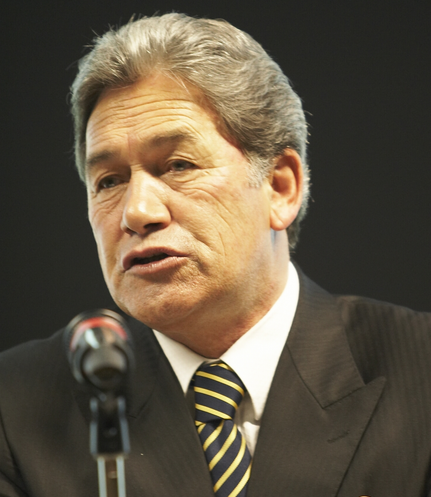

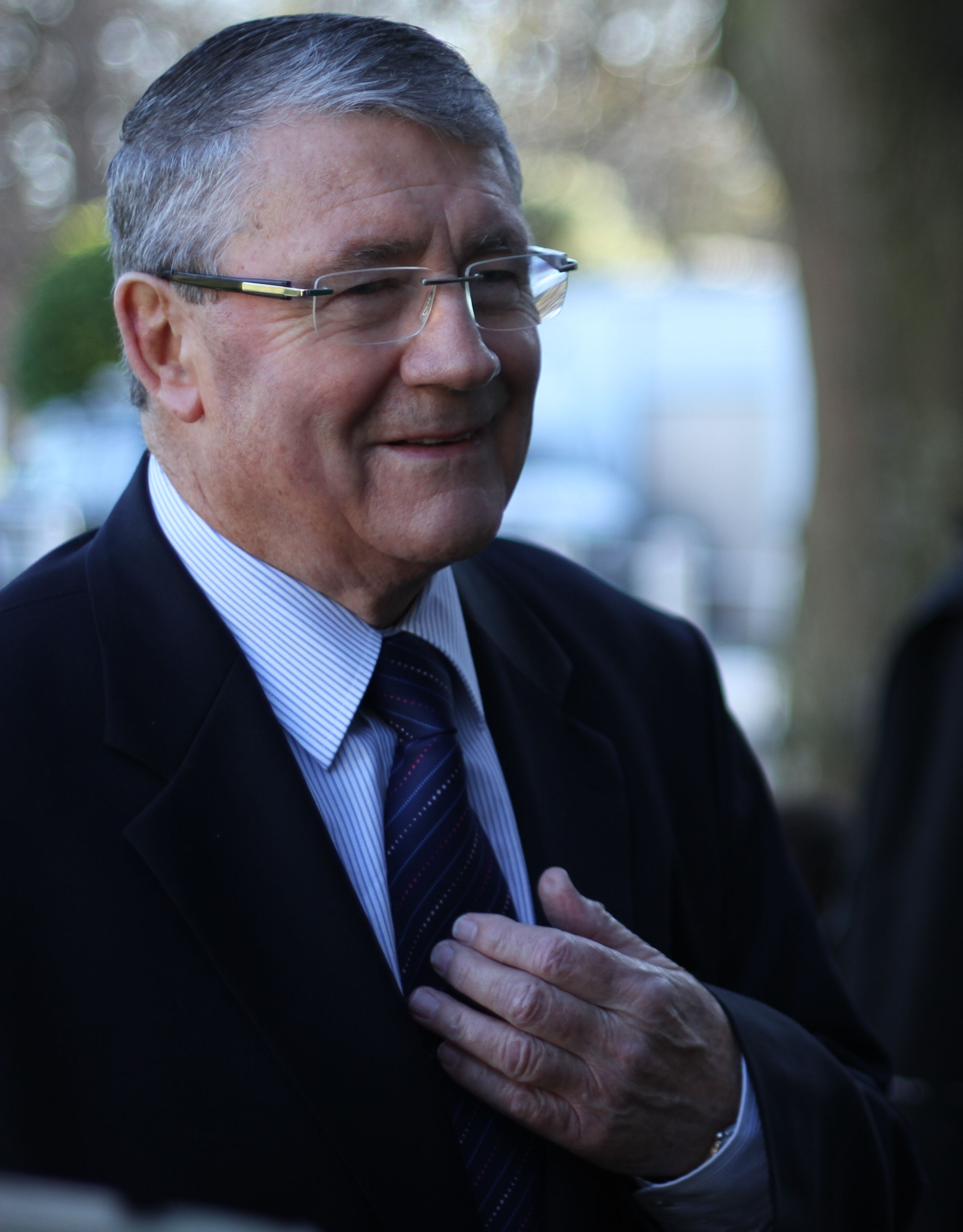

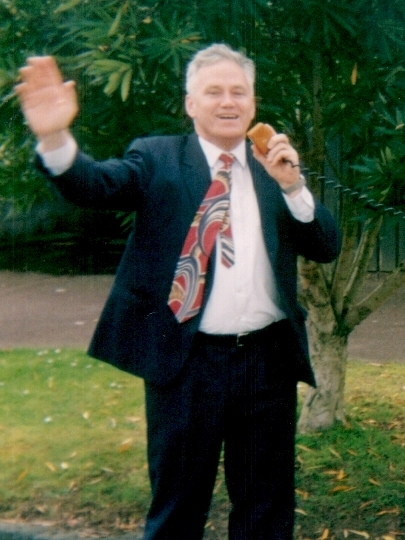
	First party	Second party	Third party
Leader	Jim Bolger	Helen Clark	Winston Peters
Party	National	Labour	NZ First
Leader since	26 March 1986	1 December 1993	18 July 1993
Leader's seat	Taranaki-King Country	Owairaka	Tauranga
Last election	50 seats, 35.05%	45 seats, 34.68%	2 seats, 8.40%
Seats before	41	41	5
Seats won	44	37	17
Seat change	▲3^{‡}	▼4^{‡}	▲12^{‡}
Party vote	701,315	584,159	276,603
Percentage	33.87%	28.19%	13.35%
	Fourth party	Fifth party	Sixth party
Leader	Jim Anderton	Richard Prebble	Clive Matthewson
Party	Alliance	ACT	United NZ
Leader since	7 May 1995	24 March 1996	28 June 1995
Leader's seat	Wigram	Wellington Central	Ran in Dunedin South (lost)
Last election	2 seats, 18.21%	Not yet founded	Not yet founded
Seats before	2	0	7
Seats won	13	8	1
Seat change	▲11^{‡}	▲8	▼6
Party vote	209,347	126,442	18,245
Percentage	10.10%	6.10%	0.88%
- Results by electorate, shaded by winning margin
Prime Minister and coalition before election
Jim Bolger (National)
National—United NZ (C&S: CDP, Conservative)
Subsequent Prime Minister and coalition
Jim Bolger (National)
National—NZ First

The 1996 New Zealand general election was held on 12 October 1996 to determine the composition of the 45th New Zealand Parliament. It was significant for being the first election to be held under the new mixed-member proportional (MMP) electoral system, and produced a parliament considerably more diverse than previous elections. Under the new MMP system, 65 members were elected in single-member districts by first-past-the-post voting (including five Māori electorates), while a further 55 "top-up" members were allocated from closed lists to achieve a proportional distribution based on each party's share of the nationwide party vote.

1996 saw the National Party, led by Jim Bolger, retain its position in government, but only after protracted negotiations with the smaller New Zealand First party to form a coalition. New Zealand First won 17 seats—including sweeping every single Māori electorate, all of which had been dominated by the Labour Party since the Second World War. Particular emphasis was placed on New Zealand First's unprecedented success, particularly among Māori; their five Māori electorate winners became known as the "Tight Five". The party's position as "kingmaker" meant they were able to place either of the two major parties into government, a significant election outcome for such a new party.

Various other unusual results occurred under the new system. For one, the National Party sought to ensure the parliamentary representation of the ACT New Zealand, a newly-formed libertarian party which had largely split from the Labour Party after the end of Rogernomics. National endorsed ACT leader and former Labour minister Richard Prebble against their own for Wellington Central, a consistently safe Labour seat. Under New Zealand's MMP rules, a party qualified for list seats if it won at least one electorate seat, regardless of vote share. Bolger thus wanted to ensure ACT could potentially be part of a National-led coalition. Prebble unexpectedly won, though ACT's vote share would have qualified them for MMP in any event. Other unusual occurrences was the large amount of new Māori MPs – leading to the backronym "More Māori in Parliament" for MMP. With the introduction of MMP in 1996, the proportion of Māori in Parliament increased from 8% to 14%, to an all-time record of 17 MPs.

== Background ==
=== Changes mid-term ===
In the 1993 election, the National Party and the Labour Party had won 50 and 45 seats, respectively. The Alliance and the New Zealand First party had each won two seats. In the approach to MMP, however, there had been considerable rearrangement in parliament, with three new parties being established. As such, the situation just before the 1996 election was markedly different from the situation that had been established at the 1993 election.

Party	Ideology	Won at 1993 election	By time of 1996 election	Reasons for change
National	Liberal conservatism	50	41	Defection of 9 MPs
Labour	Social democracy	45	41	Defection of 4 MPs
United	Centrism	–	7	Formed by 4 former National MPs and 3 former Labour MPs
NZ First	Populism; Anti-neoliberalism	2	5	Initial MPs joined by 2 former National MPs and one former Labour MP
Alliance	Progressivism; Green politics	2	2	No change
Conservative	Conservatism	–	1	Founded by 2 former National MPs; one later became an independent
Christian Democrats	Christian democracy	–	1	Founded by a former National MP
Independents	–	–	1	Ross Meurant, a former National (and briefly Conservative) MP

=== Electoral redistribution ===
The 1996 election was notable for the significant change of electorate boundaries, based on the provisions of the Electoral Act 1993. Because of the introduction of the MMP electoral system, the number of electorates had to be reduced, leading to significant changes. Under MMP, there would be only 65 district members (including five Maori members), down by 34 from the number elected in the 1993 election. The previous 95 non-Maori electorates had to be redrawn into just 60 new electorates. The Maori electorates were redrawn too, due to an increase of one overall.

Many electorates were abolished, with their territories being incorporated into completely new electoral districts. More than half of the electorates contested in 1996 were newly constituted, and most of the remainder had seen significant boundary changes. Wanganui was renamed as Whanganui. In total, 73 electorates were abolished, 29 electorates were newly created, and 10 electorates were recreated, giving a net loss of 34 electorates. The North Island went from about 65 districts to only 44 in the redistribution.

South Island

Since the 1967 electoral redistribution, the South Island had its number of general electorates fixed at 25. For the 1996 election and onwards, the number of South Island electorates is fixed at 16. The number of electors on the general roll of the South Island divided by 16 gives the target size for North Island and Māori electorates; this is referred to as the South Island quota.

The electorates of Avon, Awarua, Christchurch North, Clutha, Dunedin West, Fendalton, Lyttelton, Marlborough, Rangiora, Selwyn, St Albans, St Kilda, Sydenham, Tasman, Timaru, Waitaki, Wallace, West Coast, and Yaldhurst were abolished in the South Island. Six existing electorates (Christchurch Central, Dunedin North, Invercargill, Nelson, Otago, and Rakaia) were kept. Seven electorates (Aoraki, Banks Peninsula, Clutha-Southland, Ilam, Kaikoura, Waimakariri, and West Coast-Tasman) were newly formed. Three electorates (Christchurch East, Dunedin South, and Wigram) were recreated.

North Island

Based on the calculation described above, the target size for North Island electorates resulted in 44 of them being required.

The electorates of Birkenhead, East Coast Bays, Eastern Bay of Plenty, Eastern Hutt, Eden, Far North, Franklin, Gisborne, Glenfield, Hastings, Hauraki, Hawkes Bay, Henderson, Heretaunga, Hobson, Horowhenua, Howick, Island Bay, Kaimai, Kaipara, Kapiti, King Country, Manawatu, Matakana, Matamata, Miramar, Mt Albert, Onehunga, Onslow, Otara, Pahiatua, Panmure, Papakura, Papatoetoe, Pencarrow, Porirua, Raglan, Remuera, Roskill, Taranaki, Tarawera, Te Atatu, Titirangi, Tongariro, Waikaremoana, Waikato, Waipa, Waitotara, Wellington-Karori, and Western Hutt were abolished in the North Island. Twenty existing electorates (Albany, Auckland Central, Hamilton East, Hamilton West, Mangere, Manurewa, Napier, New Lynn, New Plymouth, North Shore, Pakuranga, Palmerston North, Rangitikei, Rotorua, Tamaki, Tauranga, Wairarapa, Waitakere, Whanganui, and Whangarei) were kept. Seventeen electorates (Mahia, Owairaka, Waipareira, Karapiro, Ohariu-Belmont, Port Waikato, Epsom, Hutt South, Mana, Manukau East, Maungakiekie, Northcote, Northland, Rimutaka, Rongotai, Taranaki-King Country, and Tukituki) were newly formed. Eight electorates (Bay of Plenty, Coromandel, Hunua, Otaki, Rodney, Taupo, and Wellington Central) were recreated.

Māori electorates

All four existing Māori electorates (Eastern Maori, Northern Maori, Southern Maori, and Western Maori) were abolished. The calculation described above resulted in five Māori electorates being required; these were Te Puku O Te Whenua, Te Tai Hauauru, Te Tai Rawhiti, Te Tai Tokerau, and Te Tai Tonga.

List seats

The House of Representatives was to have 120 seats, of which 65 were filled through electorate MPs (16 from South Island electorates, 44 from North Island electorates, and 5 from Māori electorates). This left 55 list seats to be filled. An outcome of the election was that no overhang seats were produced. (If they had been, compensation seats might have been required.)

=== MPs retiring in 1996 ===
Eleven MPs intended to retire at the end of the 44th Parliament.

Party	Name	Electorate
National	Robert Anderson	Kaimai
National	Philip Burdon	Fendalton
National	Warren Cooper	Otago
National	Robin Gray	Clutha
National	John Falloon	Pahiatua
National	Roger McClay	Waikaremoana
National	Rob Storey	Waikato
NZ First	Michael Laws	Hawkes Bay
Labour	David Caygill	St Albans
Labour	David Lange	Mangere
Labour	Elizabeth Tennet	Island Bay

== The election ==
The date of the 1996 election was 12 October; it was brought forward slightly to avoid the need for a by-election following the resignation of Michael Laws, as a by-election is not needed if there will be a general election within 6 months of a seat being vacated.

Of the 2,418,587 people registered to vote, 88.3% turned out to vote. The turnout was a slight improvement on the previous two elections, but still slightly lower than what would have been expected during the 1980s. The number of seats being contested was 120, an increase of 21 from the previous election, but as 55 of the new seats were for list candidates, the number of electorates was reduced considerably and many electorates had their boundaries amended or were abolished. While the number of general electorates decreased from 95 (1993) to 60 (1996), the number of Māori electorates increased from 4 to 5.

In the election 842 candidates stood, and there were 21 registered parties with party lists. Of the candidates, 459 were electorate and list, 152 were electorate only, and 231 were list only. 73% of candidates (616) were male and 27% (226) female.

== Results ==
The 1996 election eventually saw a victory for the governing National Party, which won around a third of the vote. The opposition Labour Party won slightly less. The election, however, was not decided by the comparative strengths of the major parties – rather, the smaller New Zealand First party, which won 17 seats, including 5 Māori seats won by the Tight Five, and was placed in the position of "kingmaker", able to provide the necessary majority to whichever side it chose. Although predicted by many to ally with Labour, on 10 December 1996 New Zealand First leader Winston Peters chose to form a coalition with National, thus preserving Prime Minister Jim Bolger's administration.

The 1996 election effectively showcased the difference made by the new electoral system. The Alliance and New Zealand First, both of which held two seats each in the old parliament, increased their representation to 13 and 17 seats, respectively, as a result of the change. The new ACT New Zealand also benefited, taking eight seats. The new United New Zealand party however was virtually wiped out, retaining only a single seat. The Conservative Party also only established only in previous Parliament by defecting Members of Parliament fared even worse, failing to remain in parliament at all. Strategic voting took place for the first time in a New Zealand MMP election in the Wellington seats of Ohariu-Belmont and Wellington Central.

However, Labour did manage to retain its status as among the top-two parties, as polls in the 1993–1996 period had shown Labour was in danger of being overtaken by the Alliance or New Zealand First. Labour's success was credited largely to its leader Helen Clark being seen as having convincingly won the election debates and running a strong campaign on health, education and social services, while Bolger was said to have run a lackluster campaign.

Also notable in the 1996 election campaign was the Christian Coalition, an alliance of the Christian Democrats and the Christian Heritage Party. Although the party had briefly crossed the 5% threshold in some polls, it gained only 4.33% at the election, and therefore did not qualify for parliamentary representation. With the exception of the Maori Ratana movement, this is the closest that an overtly religious party has come to winning representation in parliament.

Voters were prepared with MMP to vote for minor party candidates with their electorate vote, hence in a number of electorates won by National or Labour the other major party candidate came third or even fourth; previously the two top polling candidates were almost always National and Labour.

== Detailed results ==
Summary of the 12 October 1996 election for the House of Representatives
Party	Party vote		Electorate vote			Seats			
Party	Votes	%	Votes	%	Change (pp)	List	Electorate	Total	+/-
National	701,315	33.84	699,073	33.91	▼1.14	14	30	44	▼6
Labour	584,159	28.19	640,884	31.08	▼3.60	11	26	37	▼8
NZ First	276,603	13.35	278,103	13.49	▲5.09	11	6	17	▲15
Alliance	209,347	10.10	231,944	11.25	▼6.96	12	1	13	▲11
ACT	126,442	6.10	77,319	3.75	new	7	1	8	new
United NZ	18,245	0.88	42,666	2.07	new	0	1	1	new
Christian Coalition	89,716	4.33	31,995	1.55	▼0.47	0	0	0	0
Legalise Cannabis	34,398	1.66	3,420	0.17	new	0	0	0	new
McGillicuddy Serious	5,990	0.29	12,177	0.59	▼0.02	0	0	0	0
Progressive Green	5,288	0.26	7,437	0.36	new	0	0	0	new
Mana Māori	4,070	0.20	4,763	0.23	▲0.06	0	0	0	0
Animals First	3,543	0.17	—	—	—	0	—	0	new
Natural Law	3,189	0.15	5,385	0.26	▼0.05	0	0	0	0
Ethnic Minority Party	2,514	0.12	—	—	—	0	—	0	new
Green Society	2,363	0.11	1,140	0.06	new	0	0	0	new
Conservatives	1,431	0.07	4,377	0.21	new	0	0	0	new
Superannuitants & Youth	1,244	0.06	686	0.03	new	0	0	0	new
Advance NZ	949	0.05	637	0.03	new	0	0	0	new
Libertarianz	671	0.03	553	0.03	new	0	0	0	new
Asia Pacific	478	0.02	293	0.01	new	0	0	0	new
Te Tawharau	404	0.02	818	0.04	new	0	0	0	new
Republican	—	—	134	0.01	new	0	0	0	new
Unregistered Parties	—	—	1,506	0.07	—	0	0	0	0
Independent	—	—	16,436	0.80	—	0	0	0	0
Valid Votes	2,072,359	97.06	2,061,746	96.56	—				
Informal votes	8,183	0.38	18,796	0.88	—				
Disallowed votes	54,633	2.56	54,633	2.56	—				
Total	2,135,175	100	2,135,175	100		55	65	120	▲21^{a}
Eligible voters and Turnout	2,418,587	88.28	2,418,587	88.28	▲5.46				

In addition to the registered parties listed above, a number of unregistered parties also contested the election. Being unregistered, they could not submit party lists (and thus receive party votes), but they could still stand candidates in individual electorates. Among the parties to do this were the Indigenous Peoples Party, the New Zealand Progressive Party (unrelated to the 2002–2012 party of the same name) and the Nga Iwi Morehu Movement. Most unregistered parties stood only a single candidate, with only four parties running in multiple electorates. In total, around 1,500 people voted for candidates from unregistered parties. In addition, 26 independents contested electorate seats. A total of 16,436 people voted for independent candidates. No candidate from an unregistered party or an independent candidate won an electorate seat.

=== Votes summary ===
Constituency Vote
National	33.91%
Labour	31.08%
NZ First	13.49%
Alliance	11.25%
ACT	3.75%
United	2.07%
Christian Coalition	1.55%
Others	2.90%

Party Vote
National	33.87%
Labour	28.19%
NZ First	13.35%
Alliance	10.10%
ACT	6.10%
Christian Coalition	4.33%
Legalise Cannabis	1.66%
United	0.88%
Others	3.21%

Parliament seats
National	36.67%
Labour	30.83%
NZ First	14.17%
Alliance	10.83%
ACT	6.67%
United	0.83%

=== Electorate results ===
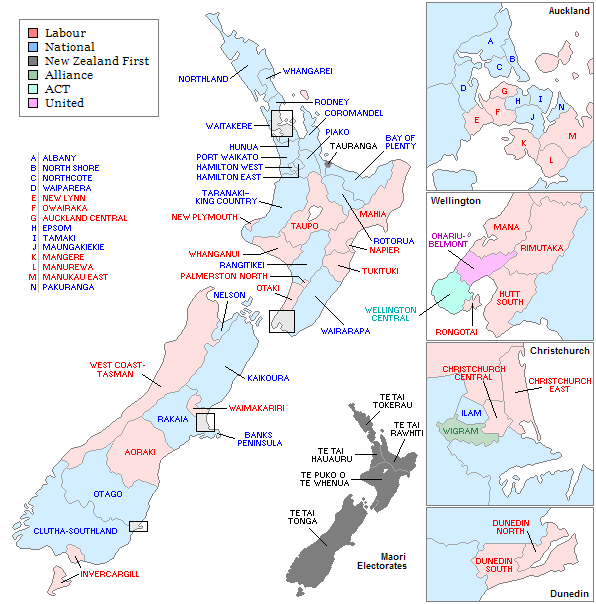
Party affiliation of winning electorate candidates.

No party managed to win a straight majority of the 65 electorates. The National Party, the governing party, was three seats short of a majority, gaining 30 seats. The Labour Party, in opposition, won 26 electorate seats. New Zealand First won six electorate seats, the highest number of any minor party for over 50 years.

The Alliance, ACT and United managed to win one electorate seat each. For United, this was a significant loss – established by break-away MPs from National and Labour, the party entered the election with seven seats, but only Peter Dunne managed to retain his position, being helped by National's decision not to field a candidate in his electorate of Ohariu-Belmont.

For the most part, traditional patterns prevailed when it came to the distribution of electorates – National performed best in rural areas, while Labour was strongest in the cities. A very significant departure from traditional patterns, however, was New Zealand First's capture of all five Maori seats, which had traditionally been Labour strongholds. Although Labour was to reclaim these seats in the subsequent election, Labour's monopoly was no longer so secure as it had been.

The table below shows the results of the 1996 general election:

Key

National Labour Alliance NZ First ACT United NZ Mana Māori Independent

Electorate results of the 1996 New Zealand general election
Electorate	Incumbent	Winner	Majority	Runner up	Third place
General electorates
Albany	Don McKinnon	Murray McCully	11,647	Terry Heffernan	Heather Ann McConachy
Aoraki	New electorate	Jim Sutton	2,932	Stuart Boag	Jenny Bloxham
Auckland Central	Sandra Lee	Judith Tizard	3,353	Sandra Lee	Shane Frith
Banks Peninsula	New electorate	David Carter	4,378	Ruth Dyson	Rod Donald
Bay of Plenty	New electorate	Tony Ryall	5,153	Peter Brown	Julie Tucker
Christchurch Central	Lianne Dalziel	Tim Barnett	653	Kerry Sutherland	Liz Gordon
Christchurch East	New electorate	Larry Sutherland	2,953	Sue McKenzie	Marie Venning
Clutha-Southland	New electorate	Bill English	9,053	Lesley Soper	Alan Wise
Coromandel	New electorate	Murray McLean	2,450	Jeanette Fitzsimons	Robyn McDonald
Dunedin North	Pete Hodgson		10,207	Margie Stevens	Jim Flynn
Dunedin South	New electorate	Michael Cullen	4,276	Leah McBay	Malcolm MacPherson
Epsom	New electorate	Christine Fletcher	20,642	Helen Duncan	Mary Tierney
Hamilton East	Dianne Yates	Tony Steel	2,347	Dianne Yates	Doug Woolerton
Hamilton West	Martin Gallagher	Bob Simcock	597	Martin Gallaghar	Neil Kirton
Hunua	New electorate	Warren Kyd	5,098	John Robertson	Paul Schofield
Hutt South	New electorate	Trevor Mallard	2,456	Joy McLauchlan	Peter Love
Ilam	New electorate	Gerry Brownlee	10,090	Eamon Daly	Margaret Austin
Invercargill	Mark Peck		4,235	Eric Roy	Owen Horton
Kaikoura	New electorate	Doug Kidd	5,912	Marian Hobbs	Tom Harrison
Karapiro	New electorate	John Luxton	9,367	Sue Moroney	Clive Mortensen
Mahia	New electorate	Janet Mackey	978	Wayne Kimber	Gordon Preston
Mana	New electorate	Graham Kelly	3,622	Allan Wells	Graham Harding
Mangere	David Lange	Taito Phillip Field	9,317	David Broome	Len Richards
Manukau East	New electorate	Ross Robertson	4,583	Ken Yee	Ngaire Clark
Manurewa	George Hawkins		8,573	Les Marinkovich	Roger Mail
Maungakiekie	New electorate	Belinda Vernon	228	Richard Northey	Matt Robson
Napier	Geoff Braybrooke		10,146	Kathryn Ward	Robin Gwynn
Nelson	John Blincoe	Nick Smith	12,424	John Blincoe	Mike Ward
New Lynn	Jonathan Hunt	Phil Goff	7,138	Richard Gardner	Cliff Robinson
New Plymouth	Harry Duynhoven		11,533	Roger Maxwell	Harry Slaats
North Shore	Bruce Cliffe	Wayne Mapp	10,348	Derek Quigley	Joel Cayford
Northcote	New electorate	Ian Revell	4,563	Ann Hartley	Grant Gillon
Northland	New electorate	John Carter	5,961	Ron Peters	Frank Grover
Ohariu-Belmont	New electorate	Peter Dunne	8,513	Verna Smith	Phillida Bunkle
Otago	Warren Cooper	Gavan Herlihy	7,005	Janet Yiakmis	Bruce Albiston
Otaki	New electorate	Judy Keall	988	Roger Sowry	Mike Smith
Owairaka	New electorate	Helen Clark	5,980	Phil Raffills	Jason Keiller
Pakuranga	Maurice Williamson		14,504	James Clarke	Robert Whooley
Palmerston North	Steve Maharey		11,030	George Mathew	Gerard Hehir
Port Waikato	New electorate	Bill Birch	7,002	John Forbes	Terry Hughes
Rakaia	Jenny Shipley		5,030	Geoff Stone	Colleen Page
Rangitikei	Denis Marshall		2,763	Jill White	Hamish MacIntyre
Rimutaka	New electorate	Paul Swain	2,878	Karyn Bisdee	Peter McCardle
Rodney	New electorate	Lockwood Smith	7,431	Mike Lee	David Gregory Gill
Rongotai	New electorate	Annette King	7,700	David Major	Bill Hamilton
Rotorua	Paul East	Max Bradford	5,896	Keith Ridings	Charles William Sturt
Tamaki	Clem Simich		8,010	Jonathan Hunt	Patricia Schnauer
Taranaki-King Country	New electorate	Jim Bolger	10,233	Robin Ord	Peter Calvert
Taupo	New electorate	Mark Burton	1,574	John McCarthy	Ian Peters
Tauranga	Winston Peters		8,028	Katherine O'Regan	Stephanie Hammond
Tukituki	New electorate	Rick Barker	7,226	Graeme Reeves	John Ormond
Waimakariri	New electorate	Mike Moore	10,606	Jim Gerard	John Wright
Waipareira	New electorate	Brian Neeson	107	Chris Carter	Jack Elder
Wairarapa	Wyatt Creech		7,867	Dave MacPherson	Lynette Stutz
Waitakere	Brian Neeson	Marie Hasler	1,981	Suzanne Sinclair	Liz Thomas
Wellington Central	New electorate	Richard Prebble	1,860	Alick Shaw	Mark Thomas
West Coast-Tasman	New electorate	Damien O'Connor	8,491	Margaret Moir	Richard Davies
Whanganui	Jill Pettis		2,214	Peter Gresham	Caroline Lampp
Whangarei	John Banks		383	Brian Donnelly	Kevin Grose
Wigram	New electorate	Jim Anderton	10,039	Angus McKay	Mick Ozimek
Māori electorates
Te Puku O Te Whenua	New electorate	Rana Waitai	2,386	Rino Tirikatene	David Rewi James
Te Tai Hauauru	New electorate	Tuku Morgan	4,961	Nanaia Mahuta	Te Pare Joseph
Te Tai Rawhiti	New electorate	Tuariki Delamere	4,215	Peter Tapsell	Tame Iti
Te Tai Tokerau	New electorate	Tau Henare	8,418	Joe Hawke	Peter Campbell
Te Tai Tonga	New electorate	Tu Wyllie	285	Whetu Tirikatene-Sullivan	Hone Kaiwai

=== List results ===
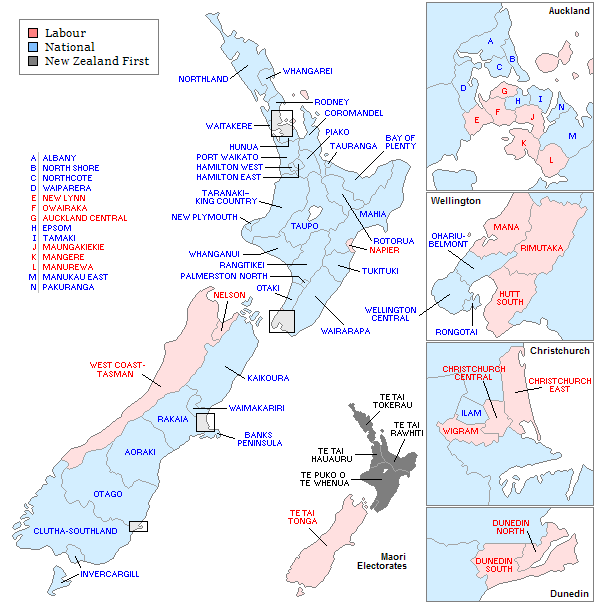
Highest polling party in each electorate.

National	Don McKinnon; Paul East^{2} Doug Graham; Georgina te Heuheu; Katherine O'Regan; Simon Upton; Joy McLauchlan; Roger Sowry; Jim Gerard^{2} Arthur Anae; Eric Roy; Peter Gresham; Roger Maxwell; Pansy Wong
National	Unsuccessful: Annabel Young^{1}, Alec Neill^{1}, Wayne Taitoko, David Major, Margie Stevens, Lindsay Tisch, Phil Raffills, Karyn Bisdee, Mark Thomas, Shane Frith, Margaret Moir, Paul Hutchison, Angus McKay, Stuart Boag, Rihari Dick Dargaville, Peta Butt, Wayne Kimber, Graeme Reeves, Sue McKenzie, George Mathew, Cliff Bedwell, Ken Yee, Kathryn Ward
Labour	Dover Samuels; Lianne Dalziel; Mark Gosche; Jonathan Hunt; Nanaia Mahuta; Jill White^{2} Marian Hobbs; Joe Hawke; Dianne Yates; Ruth Dyson; Tariana Turia
Labour	Unsuccessful: Helen Duncan^{1}, John Blincoe, Martin Gallagher, Verna Smith, Matiu Dickson, Suzanne Sinclair, Richard Northey, Sue Moroney, Lesley Soper, Amanda Coulston, Lynette Stutz, Nellie Clay, Fa'amatuainu Tui, Bronwyn Maxwell, Geoff Stone, Bruce Raitt, Leo Mangos, Ishwar Ganda, Lorraine Wilson, Valerie Taylor, Norah Walker, Rosemary Michie, Ann Hartley, Trudi Sunitsch, Tamati Kruger, Geoff Rowling, John Forman, Jeanne Macaskill, David Munro, Gary Williams, Graham Elliot, Ben Cheah, Nathan Saminathan, Sunia Raitava, Hori Awa, Henry De Thierry
New Zealand First	Ann Batten; Peter McCardle; Jenny Bloxham; Brian Donnelly; Jack Elder; Doug Woolerton; Deborah Morris^{2} Ron Mark; Neil Kirton; Peter Brown; Robyn McDonald
New Zealand First	Unsuccessful: Gilbert Myles^{1}, Ian Peters, Graham Harding, Claire Bulman, Jason Keiller, Clive Mortensen, Bernard Downey, Nicci Bergman, Neil Benson, Ross Gluer, Janie Phillips, Terry Heffernan, Helen Broughton, Tom Harrison, John Forbes, Colleen Page, Robin Ord, David Gill, George Groombridge, Robert Whooley, Trevor Jans, Patra de Coudray, Lem Pearse, Keri Kingi, Stuart Spencer, Richard Whittaker, Charles Sturt, Ron Chamberlain, Gavin Logan, Gordon Preston, Henry Slaats, Owen Horton, Duncan Matthews, Roger Mail, Dawn Mullins, Alan Wise, Peter Woolston, Stan Perkins, Jack Tamihana, Noeline McGlynn, Ngaire Clark, Clem Huriwaka, Thomas Moana, Marlene Kennedy, John Riddell
Alliance	Sandra Lee; Jeanette Fitzsimons; John Wright; Frank Grover; Pam Corkery; Matt Robson; Laila Harré; Phillida Bunkle; Rod Donald; Grant Gillon; Alamein Kopu; Liz Gordon
Alliance	Unsuccessful: Dave MacPherson, Hone Kaiwai, Mike Smith, Leah McBey, Heather-Ann McConnachy, Hamish MacIntyre, Willie Jackson, Tafa Mulitalo, Keith Ridings, Joel Cayford, Keith Locke, Jan Davey, Bill Hamilton, Caroline Lampp, Gerard Hehir, Trevor Barnard, Danna Glendining, Jim Flynn, Rex Verity, Vernon Tile, Marie Venning, Peter Campbell, John Kilbride, Mary Tierney, Liz Thomas, Ashok Parbhu, Sue Gaffy, Harry Alchin-Smith, Rosalie Steward, Sheryl Cadman, Celia Wade-Brown, Norman Wood, Moira Lawler, Mike Ward, Kevin Campbell, Richard Davies, Gary Barham, Christine Dann, Ian Ewen-Street, Robin Gwynn, Rewi James, Brendan Tracey, Bruce Stirling, John Pemberton, Te Pare Joseph, Graham Smith, Len Richards, Tracey Hicks, Mark Robertson, Brian Morris, Huia Mitchell, Francis Petchey
ACT	Derek Quigley; Ken Shirley; Donna Awatere Huata; Patricia Schnauer; Owen Jennings; Rodney Hide; Muriel Newman
ACT	Unsuccessful: Anne Dill, John Ormond, Christopher Milne, Vincent Ashworth, Marilyn Thomas, Michael Steeneveld, Nigel Mattison, Peter Snow, Valerie Wilde, Merania Karauria, Jean Hill, Marlene Lamb, Owen Dance, Katharine Sillars, Heather Mackay, Kevin Rose, John Boscawen, Matthew Ball, Garry Mallett, Angus Ogilvie, Roland Henderson, Kieran Bird, Simon Harding, Tony Huston, Thomas Howard, Robin Clulee, Peggy Luke-Ngaheke, Barry Rushton, Dean Richardson, John Latimer, John Lithgow, John Thompson, Adrian Dixon, Derek Daniell, Stephen Gore, Neil Wilson, Graeme Williams, Kevin Mathewson, Stephen Wrathall, Ian McGimpsey, Louis Crimp, Barrie Barnes, Jeffrey Buchanan, Peter King-Talbot, Brian Dent, Stephen Depiazzi, Victor Bailey, Reginald Turner
Christian Coalition	Unsuccessful: Graeme Lee, Graham Capill, Annetta Moran, Ewen McQueen, John Jamieson, Grant Bradfield, Peter Yarrell, Julie Belding, Ian Tulloch, Mike Lloyd, Gael Donoghue, Geoff Hounsell, Murray Smith, Robin Corner, Rosemarie Thomas, Grant Bowater, Kevin Harper, Nick Barber, John Allen, Vic Jarvis, Alan Marshall, Rosemary Francis, Lindsay Bain, Helma Vermeulen, John Lawrence, Barrie Paterson, Selwyn Stevens, Wayne Chapman, Judith Phillips, Dennis Knox, Braden Matson, Geoff Francis, Kevin Honore, Maahi Tukapua, Neville Chamberlain, Renton Maclauchlan, Eleanor Goodall, Geoff Winter, Lindsay Priest, Barry Pepperell, Enosa Auva'a
Legalise Cannabis	Unsuccessful: Michael Appleby, Michael Finlayson, Donald McIntosh, Metiria Turei, Nándor Tánczos, Martin McCully, Gregory Cobb, Tim Shadbolt, Christopher Fowlie, Elsie Barnes, Richard Austin, Richard Arachnid, Vayna Tickle, Damian Joyce, Timothy Marshall, Joel Robinson, Honty Whaanga, Sarah Ahern, Robert Ueberfeldt
United	Unsuccessful: Clive Matthewson, Margaret Austin, John Robertson, Pauline Gardiner, Peter Hilt, Diane Colson, Ted Faleauto, Malcolm Hood, Ramparkash Samujh, Timothy Macindoe, Gail McIntosh, Frank Owen, Steven Bright, John Howie, Jacinta Grice, Keven Fleury, Graham Butterworth, Graeme Brown, Bryan Mockridge, Francis Ifopo, Jack Austin, Stuart Jordan, Derek Round, Neil Jury, John Hubscher, Brigitte Hicks-Willer, Michael Hilt, Gray Phillips
McGillicuddy Serious	Unsuccessful: Mark Servian, Penni Bousfield, Paull Cooke, K T Julian, Robyn West, Steve Richards, Val Smith, Bernard Smith, Paul Smith, Greg Smith, Gavin Smith, Wendy Howard, Justine Francis, Doug Mackie, Grant Knowles, Marc de Boer, Swami Anand Hasyo, Peter Caldwell, Tim Owens, Adrian Holroyd, Johnny Wharton, Craig Beere, Paul Beere, William Beere, Mike Legge, Adrienne Carthew, Ross Gardner, Graeme Minchin, Grant Prankered, Derek Craig, Alastair McGlinchy, Vanessa Carnevale, Rodney Hansen, Brent T Soper, Dave Dick, Alastair Ramsden, Judy van den Yssel-Richards, Barry Bryant, Beth Holland, Rory Cathcart, Richard Griffiths, Kerry Hoole, Heidi Borchardt, Peter Clark, Nick Harper, Carly Taylor, Dale Magnus Taylor, Anthony Hobbs, Cassandra Church, Julia Johnson, Jono Baddiley, Johana Sanders, Brett Robinson, Geoff Burnett, Leanne Ireland, Tim Foster, Gary Young, Karen Nicholas, Layton, Anna Murray, Phil Clayton, Mark Baxter, Toni-Ann Alsop, David Sutcliffe, Graeme Cairns
Progressive Greens	Unsuccessful: Rob Fenwick, Gary Taylor, Alison Davis, Mark Bellingham, Laurence Boomert, Rodger Spiller, Gwenny Davis, Eithne Hanley, Peter Lee, Guy Salmon, David Green, Matthew Horrocks, Chris Marshall, Bob McKegg, Kevin Prime
Mana Maori	Unsuccessful: Angeline Greensill, Tame Iti, Moana Sinclair, Hone Harawira, Mereana Pitman, David Gilgin, Jackie Amohanga, Ken Mair, Joyce Te Hemara Maipi, Oneroa Pihema, Te Anau Tuiono, Waiariki Grace, Jim Perry, Diane Prince, Kelly Pene, Rachael Raimona, Mere Grant, Jack John Smith
Animals First	Unsuccessful: Rosemary Cumming, Susan Walker, Terri Walsh, Virginia Woolf, Adrienne Hall, Peter Crosse, Alistair McKellow
Natural Law	Unsuccessful: Bryan Lee, David Lovell-Smith, John Hodgson, John Cleary, Mere Austin, Penelope Donovan, Gail Pianta, Mark Watts, Guy Hatchard, Tony Martin, Warwick Jones, Graeme Kettle, Judy Boock, Daniel Meares, Richard Moreham, lan Gaustad, Mimousse Hodgson, Bruce Brown, Mary-Anne McGregor, Graeme Lodge, Mike Barthelmeh, Kevin O'Brien, Inga Schader, Lynne Patterson, Kay Morgan, Tom Hopwood, Martyn Ouseley, Andrew Sanderson, Bruce Sowry, Sean O'Connor, Raymond Cain, Ian Levingston, Greg Dodds, Carolyn Drake, Raylene Lodge, Angela Wood, Grant Bilyard, Frank Gwynne, Michelle McGregor, Helen Treadwell, Mark Rayner, Selwyn Austin, Kevin Harvey, Ken Thomas, Mike Dunn, John Blatchford, Belinda Hills, Tim Irwin, Wayne Shepherd, Faye McLaren, Royal Van der Werf, Martin Davy, Jan Flynn, Gilbert Urquhart, Ian Smillie, Andrew Davy, Leigh Bush, Anne Brigid, Joanna Greig, Angela Slade, Jacque Hughes, Lew Cormack, Les McGrath, Rhonda Comins, Lynne Lee
Ethnic Minority	Unsuccessful: Robert Hum, Vinod Kumar Sharma, Glen A van der Boon-Brayshaw, Pathic Vyas, Marcial R Eleazar, Tin Yau Chan, Seth M Dalgleish, Christine Wong, Navinbhai Parbhubhai Patel, Rajiv Sood, Lindsay Harris
Green Society	Unsuccessful: Simon Reeves, Peter Whitmore, Merete Molving, Hans Grueber, Sam Cunningham, Vic Albion, Bryan Pippen, Colin Amery, Stephanie Urlich, Bradley Heising, Jacqueline Tong
Conservatives	Unsuccessful: Trevor Rogers, Margaret McHugh, Eric Werder, Dennis Quirke, Bob Vine, David Gettins, Simone Graham, David Lean, Steve Howard, Hohn Bracey, John Tinsley, Bill Perry, Carmel Crowe, Bruce Herbert, Merv Jull, Craig Lewis, Tom Maunder, Jim Howard, Arthur French, Jerry Hohneck
Superannuitants and Youth	Unsuccessful: John Cronin, Trevor Gilligan, Jack Powell, Leslie Stroud, Karen Kirk, Peter Little, Bernon Bryne, Kathleen Collinge, Douglas Milne, Donald Chapman, Cyril Murphy, Kenneth Crafar
Advance New Zealand	Unsuccessful: England So'onalole, James Prescott, Taimalelagi Tofilau, Afamasaga Rasmussen, Eric Chuah, Hinemoa Herewini, Fauila Tatu Williams, Manu Prescott, Ben Taufua, Dawn Ngature
Libertarianz	Unsuccessful: Lindsay Perigo, Deborah Coddington, Ian Fraser, Peter Cresswell, Peter Eichmann, Keith Patterson, John Calvert, Simon Fraser, Nikolas Haden, Jessica Weddell, Glen Jameson, Paul Rousell, William Trolove, Scott Barnett, Robert White, Andrew Ayling, Anna Woolf, Paul Hendry, Don Rowberry, Derek McGovern, Barbara Jury, Philip Petch, Theo Van Oostrom, Jackie Van Oostrom
Asia Pacific United	Unsuccessful: Mano'o Mulitalo, Rama Ramanathan, Peti Satiu, Arbutus Mitikulena, Fu Bihua, Tuli Wong-Kee, Angela Tuu, Mailo Pesamino, Pulumulo Sasa
Te Tawharau	Unsuccessful: William Coates, Koro Wikeepa, Hawea Vercoe, John Maihi, Steven Te Kani, Rangitukehu Paora

Notes

1. These party list members later entered parliament in the term as other list MPs elected resigned from parliament.
2. These party list members later resigned during the parliamentary term.

=== Summary of seat changes ===
- Seats captured:
  - By National: Hamilton East, Hamilton West and Nelson were captured from Labour. North Shore was captured from United.
  - By Labour: Auckland Central was captured from the Alliance.
- Seats transferred from departing MPs to new MPs:
  - The seats of Albany, Otago, Rotorua and Waitakere, all held by departing National MPs, were won by new National candidates. One departing MP retired, one was re-elected in a different electorate, and two became list MPs.
  - The seats of Christchurch Central, Mangere and New Lynn, all held by departing Labour MPs, were won by new Labour candidates. One departing MP retired and two became list MPs.
