= Party lists in the 1996 New Zealand general election =

New Zealand political candidates in the MMP era
Year	Party list	Candidates
1996	party lists	by electorate
1999	party lists	by electorate
2002	party lists	by electorate
2005	party lists	by electorate
2008	party lists	by electorate
2011	party lists	by electorate
2014	party lists	by electorate
2017	party lists	by electorate
2020	party lists	by electorate
2023	party lists	by electorate
2026	party lists	by electorate

This page provides the party lists put forward in New Zealand's 1996 election. Party lists determine, in the light of country-wide proportional voting, the appointment of list MPs under the mixed-member proportional representation (MMP) electoral system. This was the first New Zealand election held under the MMP electoral system.

== Successful parties ==
There were six parties successful at the 1996 election:

=== ACT ===
Rank	Name	Incumbency	Contesting electorate	Initial results	Later changes
1	Richard Prebble	(Former MP)	Wellington Central	✓ Won Wellington Central	
2	Derek Quigley	(Former MP)	North Shore	✓ Elected from list	
3	Ken Shirley	(Former MP)	Ohariu-Belmont	✓ Elected from list	
4	Donna Awatere Huata		Te Puku O Te Whenua	✓ Elected from list	
5	Patricia Schnauer		Tāmaki	✓ Elected from list	
6	Owen Jennings		West Coast-Tasman	✓ Elected from list	
7	Rodney Hide		Auckland Central	✓ Elected from list	
8	Muriel Newman		Whangarei	✓ Elected from list	
9	Anne Dill		Otago		
10	John Ormond		Tukituki		
11	Christopher Milne		Hutt South		
12	Vincent Ashworth		Karapiro		
13	Marilyn Thomas		Albany		
14	Michael Steeneveld		Dunedin North		
15	Nigel Mattison		Ilam		
16	Peter Snow		Clutha-Southland		
17	Valerie Wilde		Palmerston North		
18	Merania Karauria		Te Tai Hauāuru		
19	Jean Hill		Napier		
20	Marlene Lamb		Port Waikato		
21	Owen Dance		Rimutaka		
22	Katharine Sillars				
23	Heather Mackay		Pakuranga		
24	Kevin Rose				
25	John Boscawen		Epsom		
26	Matthew Ball		Christchurch Central		
27	Garry Mallett		Hamilton West		
28	Angus Ogilvie		Maungakiekie		
29	Roland Henderson		Dunedin South		
30	Kieran Bird		Northcote		
31	Simon Harding		Hunua		
32	Tony Huston		New Plymouth		
33	Thomas Howard		Coromandel		
34	Robin Clulee		Otaki		
35	Peggy Luke-Ngaheke				
36	Barry Rushton				
37	Dean Richardson		Rakaia		
38	John Latimer		Northland		
39	John Lithgow	(Former MP)	Whanganui		
40	John Thompson		Manurewa		
41	Adrian Dixon		Taupo		
42	Derek Daniell		Wairarapa		
43	Stephen Gore		Rongotai		
44	Neil Wilson		Mana		
45	Graeme Williams		Hamilton East		
46	Kevin Mathewson		Mangere		
47	Stephen Wrathall		Rotorua		
48	Ian McGimpsey				
49	Louis Crimp		Invercargill		
50	Barrie Barnes				
51	Jeffrey Buchanan		Christchurch East		
52	Peter King-Talbot		Kaikoura		
53	Brian Dent		Rodney		
54	Stephen Depiazzi		Waitakere		
55	Victor Bailey		Rangitikei		
56	Reg Turner		Bay of Plenty		

=== Alliance ===
Rank	Name	Component Party	Incumbency	Contesting electorate	Initial results	Later changes
1	Jim Anderton	NewLabour	Sydenham	Wigram	✓ Won Wigram	
2	Sandra Lee	Mana Motuhake	Auckland Central	Auckland Central	✓ Elected from list	
3	Jeanette Fitzsimons	Greens		Coromandel	✓ Elected from list	
4	John Wright	Democrats		Waimakariri	✓ Elected from list	
5	Frank Grover	Liberal		Northland	✓ Elected from list	
6	Pam Corkery	NewLabour			✓ Elected from list	
7	Matt Robson	NewLabour		Maungakiekie	✓ Elected from list	
8	Laila Harré	NewLabour		Waipareira	✓ Elected from list	
9	Phillida Bunkle	Greens		Ohariu-Belmont	✓ Elected from list	
10	Rod Donald	Greens		Banks Peninsula	✓ Elected from list	
11	Grant Gillon	Democrats		Northcote	✓ Elected from list	
12	Alamein Kopu	Mana Motuhake		Te Tai Rawhiti	✓ Elected from list	
13	Liz Gordon	NewLabour		Christchurch Central	✓ Elected from list	
14	Dave MacPherson	NewLabour		Wairarapa		
15	Hone Kaiwai	Mana Motuhake		Te Tai Tonga		
16	Mike Smith	Greens		Otaki		
17	Leah McBey	Greens		Dunedin South		
18	Heather-Ann McConachy	Democrats		Albany		
19	Hamish MacIntyre	Liberal	(Former MP)	Rangitikei		
20	Willie Jackson	Mana Motuhake		Manurewa		
21	Tafa Mulitalo	NewLabour		Manukau East		
22	Keith Ridings	NewLabour		Rotorua		
23	Joel Cayford	Greens		North Shore		
24	Keith Locke	NewLabour		Owairaka		
25	Jan Davey	Democrats		Ilam		
26	Bill Hamilton	Mana Motuhake		Rongotai		
27	Caroline Lampp	Liberal		Whanganui		
28	Gerard Hehir	NewLabour		Palmerston North		
29	Trevor Barnard	Democrats		Pakuranga		
30	Danna Glendining	Greens		Wellington Central		
31	Jim Flynn	NewLabour		Dunedin North		
32	Rex Verity	Greens		Aoraki		
33	Vernon Tile	NewLabour		Mana		
34	Marie Venning	NewLabour		Christchurch East		
35	Peter Campbell	Mana Motuhake		Te Tai Tokerau		
36	John Kilbride	Democrats		Karapiro		
37	Mary Tierney	Democrats		Epsom		
38	Liz Thomas	Greens		Waitakere		
39	Ashok Parbhu	Greens		Hamilton East		
40	Sue Gaffy	Liberal		New Plymouth		
41	Harry Alchin-Smith	Democrats		Tukituki		
42	Rosalie Steward	Greens		Tāmaki		
43	Sheryl Cadman	NewLabour		Taupo		
44	Celia Wade-Brown	Greens				
45	Norman Wood	NewLabour		Otago		
46	Moira Lawler	NewLabour				
47	Mike Ward	Greens		Nelson		
48	Kevin Campbell	NewLabour		Taranaki-King Country		
49	Richard Davies	Greens		West Coast-Tasman		
50	Gary Barham	Greens		Tauranga		
51	Christine Dann	Liberal				
52	Ian Ewen-Street	Greens		Kaikoura		
53	Robin Gwynn	NewLabour		Napier		
54	Rewi James	Mana Motuhake		Te Puku O Te Whenua		
55	Brendan Tracey	Democrats		Rimutaka		
56	Bruce Stirling	Democrats		Invercargill		
57	John Pemberton	Democrats		Hamilton West		
58	Te Pare Joseph	Mana Motuhake		Te Tai Hauāuru		
59	Graham Smith	NewLabour		Mahia		
60	Len Richards	NewLabour		Mangere		
61	Tracey Hicks	Democrats		Clutha-Southland		
62	Mark Robertson	Democrats		Rakaia		
63	Brian Morris	Liberal		Whangarei		
64	Huia Mitchell	Democrats		Hunua		
65	Francis Petchey	Liberal		Port Waikato		

=== New Zealand First ===
Rank	Name	Incumbency	Contesting electorate	Initial results	Later changes
1	Winston Peters	Tauranga	Tauranga	✓ Won Tauranga	
2	Tau Henare	Northern Maori	Te Tai Tokerau	✓ Won Te Tai Tokerau	
3	Ann Batten		North Shore	✓ Elected from list	
4	Peter McCardle	Heretaunga	Rimutaka	✓ Elected from list	
5	Jenny Bloxham		Aoraki	✓ Elected from list	
6	Brian Donnelly		Whangarei	✓ Elected from list	
7	Jack Elder	Henderson	Waipareira	✓ Elected from list	
8	Doug Woolerton		Hamilton East	✓ Elected from list	
9	Deborah Morris		Hutt South	✓ Elected from list	✗ Left parliament in 1999
10	Tuku Morgan		Te Tai Hauāuru	✓ Won Te Tai Hauāuru	
11	Ron Mark		Christchurch Central	✓ Elected from list	
12	Neil Kirton		Hamilton West	✓ Elected from list	
13	Peter Brown		Bay of Plenty	✓ Elected from list	
14	Robyn McDonald		Coromandel	✓ Elected from list	
15	Gilbert Myles	(Former MP)	Maungakiekie		✓ Replaced Deborah Morris in 1999
16	Ian Peters	(Former MP)	Taupo		
17	Graham Harding		Mana		
18	Tuariki Delamere		Te Tai Rawhiti	✓ Won Te Tai Rawhiti	
19	Claire Bulman		Waimakariri		
20	Jason Keiller		Owairaka		
21	Clive Mortensen		Karapiro		
22	Bernard Downey		Nelson		
23	Nicci Bergman		Wigram		
24	Neil Benson		Dunedin North		
25	Ross Gluer		Banks Peninsula		
26	Janie Phillips		Northcote		
27	Rana Waitai		Te Puku O Te Whenua	✓ Won Te Puku O Te Whenua	
28	Terry Heffernan		Albany		
29	Helen Broughton		Ilam		
30	Tom Harrison		Kaikoura		
31	John Forbes		Port Waikato		
32	Colleen Page		Rakaia		
33	Robin Ord		Taranaki-King Country		
34	David Gill		Rodney		
35	George Groombridge		Wairarapa		
36	Tu Wyllie		Te Tai Tonga	✓ Won Te Tai Tonga	
37	Robert Whooley		Pakuranga		
38	Trevor Jans		Palmerston North		
39	Patra de Coudray		Hunua		
40	Lem Pearse		Christchurch East		
41	Keri Kingi		Tukituki		
42	Stuart Spencer		Napier		
43	Richard Whittaker		Auckland Central		
44	Charles Sturt		Rotorua		
45	Ron Chamberlain		Tāmaki		
46	Gavin Logan		Epsom		
47	Gordon Preston		Mahia		
48	Henry Slaats		New Plymouth		
49	Owen Horton		Invercargill		
50	Duncan Matthews		Whanganui		
51	Roger Mail		Manurewa		
52	Dawn Mullins		New Lynn		
53	Alan Wise		Clutha-Southland		
54	Peter Woolston		Rangitikei		
55	Stan Perkins		Otago		
56	Jack Tamihana		Otaki		
57	Noeline McGlynn		Dunedin South		
58	Ngaire Clark		Manukau East		
59	Clem Huriwaka		Rongotai		
60	Thomas Moana		Mangere		
61	Marlene Kennedy		West Coast-Tasman		
62	John Riddell		Waitakere		

=== Labour Party ===
Rank	Name	Incumbency	Contesting electorate	Initial results	Later changes
1	Helen Clark	Mt Albert	Owairaka	✓ Won Owairaka	
2	Michael Cullen	St Kilda	Dunedin South	✓ Won Dunedin South	
3	Dover Samuels			✓ Elected from list	
4	Lianne Dalziel	Christchurch Central		✓ Elected from list	
5	Mark Gosche			✓ Elected from list	
6	Annette King	Miramar	Rongotai	✓ Won Rongotai	
7	Jonathan Hunt	New Lynn	Tāmaki	✓ Elected from list	
8	Nanaia Mahuta		Te Tai Hauāuru	✓ Elected from list	
9	Jill White	Manawatu	Rangitikei	✓ Elected from list	✗ Left parliament in 1998
10	Mark Burton	Tongariro	Taupo	✓ Won Taupo	
11	Judith Tizard	Panmure	Auckland Central	✓ Won Auckland Central	
12	Marian Hobbs		Kaikoura	✓ Elected from list	
13	Graham Kelly	Porirua	Mana	✓ Won Mana	
14	Jill Pettis	Whanganui	Whanganui	✓ Won Whanganui	
15	Joe Hawke		Te Tai Tokerau	✓ Elected from list	
16	Dianne Yates	Hamilton East	Hamilton East	✓ Elected from list	
17	Janet Mackey	Gisborne	Mahia	✓ Won Mahia	
18	Jim Sutton	Timaru	Aoraki	✓ Won Aoraki	
19	Ruth Dyson	Lyttelton	Banks Peninsula	✓ Elected from list	
20	Tariana Turia			✓ Elected from list	
21	Mark Peck	Invercargill	Invercargill	✓ Won Invercargill	
22	Helen Duncan		Epsom		✓ Replaced Jill White in 1998
23	John Blincoe	Nelson	Nelson	✗ Lost seat	
24	Martin Gallagher	Hamilton West	Hamilton West	✗ Lost seat	
25	Verna Smith		Ohariu-Belmont		
26	Matiu Dickson				
27	Suzanne Sinclair	Titirangi	Waitakere	✗ Lost seat	
28	Rick Barker	Hastings	Tukituki	✓ Won Tukituki	
29	Richard Northey	Onehunga	Maungakiekie	✗ Lost seat	
30	Pete Hodgson	Dunedin North	Dunedin North	✓ Won Dunedin North	
31	Sue Moroney		Karapiro		
32	Damien O'Connor	West Coast	West Coast-Tasman	✓ Won West Coast-Tasman	
33	Lesley Soper		Clutha-Southland		
34	Amanda Coulston				
35	Lynette Stutz		Wairarapa		
36	Nellie Clay				
37	Fa'amatuainu Tui				
38	Bronwynn Maxwell				
39	Geoff Stone		Rakaia		
40	Bruce Raitt				
41	Leo Mangos				
42	Ishwar Ganda				
43	Lorraine Wilson				
44	Valerie Taylor				
45	Norah Walker				
46	Rosemary Michie		Rotorua		
47	Ann Hartley		Northcote		
48	Trudi Sunitsch				
49	Tamati Kruger				
50	Geoff Rowling				
51	John Forman				
52	Jeanne Macaskill				
53	David Munro				
54	Gary Williams				
55	Graham Elliot				
56	Ben Cheah				
57	Nathan Saminathan				
58	Sunia Raitava				
59	Hori Awa				
60	Henry De Thierry				

=== National Party ===
Rank	Name	Incumbency	Contesting electorate	Initial results	Later changes
1	Jim Bolger	King Country	Taranaki-King Country	✓ Won Taranaki-King Country	✗ Left parliament in 1998
2	Don McKinnon	Albany		✓ Elected from list	
3	Bill Birch	Franklin	Port Waikato	✓ Won Port Waikato	
4	Jenny Shipley	Rakaia	Rakaia	✓ Won Rakaia	
5	Paul East	Rotorua		✓ Elected from list	✗ Left parliament in 1999
6	Doug Graham	Remuera		✓ Elected from list	
7	Georgina te Heuheu			✓ Elected from list	
8	Lockwood Smith	Kaipara	Rodney	✓ Won Rodney	
9	Bill English	Wallace	Clutha-Southland	✓ Won Clutha-Southland	
10	Katherine O'Regan	Waipa	Tauranga	✓ Elected from list	
11	Simon Upton	Raglan		✓ Elected from list	
12	Wyatt Creech	Wairarapa	Wairarapa	✓ Won Wairarapa	
13	Joy McLauchlan	Western Hutt	Hutt South	✓ Elected from list	
14	Doug Kidd	Marlborough	Kaikoura	✓ Won Kaikoura	
15	Roger Sowry	Kapiti	Otaki	✓ Elected from list	
16	John Banks	Whangarei	Whangarei	✓ Won Whangarei	
17	Jim Gerard	Rangiora	Waimakariri	✓ Elected from list	✗ Left parliament in 1997
18	Belinda Vernon		Maungakiekie	✓ Won Maungakiekie	
19	Arthur Anae			✓ Elected from list	
20	Maurice Williamson	Pakuranga	Pakuranga	✓ Won Pakuranga	
21	Murray McCully	East Coast Bays	Albany	✓ Won Albany	
22	Christine Fletcher	Eden	Epsom	✓ Won Epsom	
23	Eric Roy	Awarua	Invercargill	✓ Elected from list	
24	Peter Gresham	Waitotara	Whanganui	✓ Elected from list	
25	Roger Maxwell	Taranaki	New Plymouth	✓ Elected from list	
26	Pansy Wong			✓ Elected from list	
27	Marie Hasler	(Former MP)	Waitakere	✓ Won Waitakere	
28	Annabel Young				✓ Replaced Jim Gerard in 1997
29	Tony Ryall	Eastern Bay of Plenty	Bay of Plenty	✓ Won Bay of Plenty	
30	Nick Smith	Tasman	Nelson	✓ Won Nelson	
31	Alec Neill	Waitaki		✗ Lost seat	✓ Replaced Paul East in 1999
32	Denis Marshall	Rangitikei	Rangitikei	✓ Won Rangitikei	
33	John Luxton	Matamata	Karapiro	✓ Won Karapiro	
34	John Carter	Far North	Northland	✓ Won Northland	
35	Brian Neeson	Waitakere	Waipareira	✓ Won Waipareira	
36	Ian Revell	Birkenhead	Northcote	✓ Won Northcote	
37	Wayne Taitoko				
38	David Major		Rongotai		
39	Margie Stevens		Dunedin North		
40	Warren Kyd	Hauraki general	Hunua	✓ Won Hunua	
41	David Carter	Selwyn	Banks Peninsula	✓ Won Banks Peninsula	
42	Clem Simich	Tāmaki	Tāmaki	✓ Won Tāmaki	
43	Lindsay Tisch				
44	Tony Steel	(Former MP)	Hamilton East	✓ Won Hamilton East	
45	Bob Simcock		Hamilton West	✓ Won Hamilton West	
46	Phil Raffills		Owairaka		
47	Gerry Brownlee		Ilam	✓ Won Ilam	
48	Karyn Bisdee		Rimutaka		
49	Mark Thomas		Wellington Central		
50	Shane Frith		Auckland Central		
51	Margaret Moir	(Former MP)	West Coast-Tasman		
52	Paul Hutchison				
53	Angus McKay		Wigram		
54	Stuart Boag		Aoraki		
55	Rihari Dick Dargaville		Te Tai Tokerau		
56	Peta Butt		Te Tai Rawhiti		
57	Gavan Herlihy		Otago	✓ Won Otago	
58	Wayne Mapp		North Shore	✓ Won North Shore	
59	Wayne Kimber	(Former MP)	Mahia		
60	Graeme Reeves	(Former MP)	Tukituki		
61	Sue McKenzie		Christchurch East		
62	George Mathew		Palmerston North		
63	Cliff Bedwell		Te Tai Tonga		
64	Ken Yee		Manukau East		
65	Kathryn Ward		Napier		

=== United New Zealand ===
Rank	Name	Incumbency	Contesting electorate	Initial results	Later changes
1	Clive Matthewson	Dunedin West	Dunedin South	✗ Lost seat	
2	Margaret Austin	Yaldhurst	Ilam	✗ Lost seat	
3	Peter Dunne	Onslow	Ohariu-Belmont	✓ Won Ohariu-Belmont	
4	John Robertson	Papakura	Hunua	✗ Lost seat	
5	Pauline Gardiner	Wellington-Karori	Wellington Central	✗ Lost seat	
6	Peter Hilt	Glenfield	Northcote	✗ Lost seat	
7	Diane Colson		Port Waikato		
8	Ted Faleauto		Manukau East		
9	Malcolm Hood		Manurewa		
10	Ramparkash Samujh		Maungakiekie		
11	Tim Macindoe		Karapiro		
12	Gail McIntosh	(Former MP)	Coromandel		
13	Frank Owen		Hutt South		
14	Steven Bright		Rongotai		
15	John Howie		Rakaia		
16	Jacinta Grice		Christchurch Central		
17	Kevin Fleury		Otago		
18	Graham Butterworth				
19	Graeme Brown		Dunedin North		
20	Bryan Mockridge		Epsom		
21	Francis Ifopo		Mangere		
22	Jack Austin				
23	Stuart Jordan		Invercargill		
24	Derek Round				
25	Neil Jury				
26	John Hubscher		New Lynn		
27	Brigitte Hicks-Willer				
28	Michael Hilt		Rodney		
29	Gray Phillips		Whangarei		

== Unsuccessful parties ==
There were 15 unsuccessful parties.

=== Advance New Zealand ===
Rank	Name	Incumbency	Contesting electorate	Initial results	Later changes
1	England So'onalole		Maungakiekie		
2	James Prescott		New Lynn		
3	Taimalelagi Tofilau		Manukau East		
4	Afamasaga Rasmussen		Mangere		
5	Eric Chuah		Owairaka		
6	Hinemoa Herewini				
7	Fauila Tatu Williams				
8	Manu Prescott		Tāmaki		
9	Ben Taufua				
10	Dawn Ngature				

=== Animals First ===
Rank	Name	Incumbency	Contesting electorate	Initial results	Later changes
1	Rosemary Cumming				
2	Susan Walker				
3	Terri Walsh				
4	Virginia Woolf				
5	Adrienne Hall				
6	Peter Crosse				
7	Alistair McKellow				

=== Aotearoa Legalise Cannabis ===
Rank	Name	Incumbency	Contesting electorate	Initial results	Later changes
1	Michael Appleby		Wellington Central		
2	Michael Finlayson				
3	Donald McIntosh				
4	Metiria Turei				
5	Nándor Tánczos				
6	Martin McCully				
7	Gregory Cobb				
8	Tim Shadbolt		Christchurch East		
9	Christopher Fowlie				
10	Elsie Barnes				
11	Richard Austin				
12	Richard Arachnid				
13	Vayna Tickle				
14	Damian Joyce				
15	Timothy Marshall				
16	Joel Robinson				
17	Honty Whaanga		Te Tai Tonga		
18	Sarah Ahern				
19	Robert Ueberfeldt				

=== Asia Pacific United ===
Rank	Name	Incumbency	Contesting electorate	Initial results	Later changes
1	Mano'o Mulitalo		Rongotai		
2	Rama Ramanathan		Wellington Central		
3	Peti Satiu				
4	Arbutus Mitikulena				
5	Fu Bihua				
6	Tuli Wong-Kee		Tukituki		
7	Angela Tuu				
8	Mailo Pesamino				
9	Pulumulo Sasa				

=== Christian Coalition ===
Rank	Name	Incumbency	Contesting electorate	Initial results	Later changes
1	Graeme Lee	Matakana		✗ Lost seat	
2	Graham Capill				
3	Annetta Moran				
4	Ewen McQueen		Epsom		
5	John Jamieson				
6	Grant Bradfield		Otago		
7	Peter Yarrell				
8	Julie Belding		North Shore		
9	Ian Tulloch				
10	Mike Lloyd		Wairarapa		
11	Gael Donoghue		Whanganui		
12	Geoff Hounsell		Rimutaka		
13	Murray Smith				
14	Robin Corner		Wellington Central		
15	Rosemarie Thomas		Ohariu-Belmont		
16	Grant Bowater		Palmerston North		
17	Kevin Harper				
18	Nick Barber		Nelson		
19	John Allen				
20	Vic Jarvis		Rangitikei		
21	Alan Marshall				
22	Rosemary Francis		Rakaia		
23	Lindsay Bain		Waimakariri		
24	Helma Vermeulen		Tukituki		
25	John Lawrence				
26	Barrie Paterson				
27	Selwyn Stevens				
28	Wayne Chapman				
29	Judith Phillips		Albany		
30	Dennis Knox				
31	Braden Matson		Manurewa		
32	Geoff Francis				
33	Kevin Honore		Otaki		
34	Maahi Tukapua		Te Puku O Te Whenua		
35	Neville Chamberlain		Banks Peninsula		
36	Renton Maclauchlan		Mana		
37	Eleanor Goodall		Hamilton West		
38	Geoff Winter		Rotorua		
39	Lindsay Priest		Hamilton East		
40	Barry Pepperell				
41	Enosa Auva'a		Hunua		

=== Ethnic Minority ===
Rank	Name	Incumbency	Contesting electorate	Initial results	Later changes
1	Robert Hum				
2	Vinod Kumar Sharma				
3	Glen van der Boon-Brayshaw				
4	Pathic Vyas				
5	Marcial R Eleazar				
6	Tin Yau Chan				
7	Seth Dalgleish				
8	Christine Wong				
9	Navinbhai Parbhubhai Patel				
10	Rajiv Sood				
11	Lindsay Harris				

=== Green Society ===
Rank	Name	Incumbency	Contesting electorate	Initial results	Later changes
1	Simon Reeves		Auckland Central		
2	Peter Whitmore		Tāmaki		
3	Merete Molving		Northcote		
4	Hans Grueber		Waitakere		
5	Sam Cunningham		Epsom		
6	Vic Albion		Rodney		
7	Bryan Pippen				
8	Colin Amery		Manurewa		
9	Stephanie Urlich				
10	Bradley Heising		North Shore		
11	Jacqueline Tong				

=== Mana Māori Movement ===
Rank	Name	Incumbency	Contesting electorate	Initial results	Later changes
1	Angeline Greensill		Te Tai Hauāuru		
2	Tame Iti		Te Tai Rawhiti		
3	Moana Sinclair				
4	Hone Harawira				
5	Mereana Pitman				
6	David Gilgin				
7	Jackie Amohanga		Taranaki-King Country		
8	Ken Mair		Te Puku O Te Whenua		
9	Joyce Te Hemara Maipi				
10	Oneroa Pihema				
11	Te Anau Tuiono				
12	Waiariki Grace		Wellington Central		
13	Jim Perry				
14	Diane Prince				
15	Kelly Pene				
16	Raimona				
17	Mere Grant				
18	Jack John Smith				

=== McGillicuddy Serious ===
Rank	Name	Incumbency	Contesting electorate	Initial results	Later changes
1	Mark Servian		Bay of Plenty		
2	Penni Bousfield				
3	Paull Cooke				
4	K T Julian		Te Tai Tokerau		
5	Robyn West		Clutha-Southland		
6	Steve Richards		West Coast-Tasman		
7	Val Smith		Rodney		
8	Bernard Smith		Northcote		
9	Paul Smith				
10	Greg Smith		Rongotai		
11	Gavin Smith				
12	Wendy Howard				
13	Justine Francis		Hamilton East		
14	Doug Mackie		Dunedin North		
15	Grant Knowles				
16	Marc de Boer				
17	Swami Anand Hasyo		Taranaki-King Country		
18	Peter Caldwell		Hamilton West		
19	Tim Owens		Nelson		
20	Adrian Holroyd		Rotorua		
21	Johnny Wharton		Ohariu-Belmont		
22	Craig Beere		Karapiro		
23	Paul Beere				
24	William Beere				
25	Mike Legge		Otago		
26	Adrienne Carthew				
27	Ross Gardner		Wellington Central		
28	Graeme Minchin				
29	Grant Prankered		Mana		
30	Derek Craig		Manurewa		
31	Alastair McGlinchy		Hutt South		
32	Vanessa Carnevale				
33	Rodney Hansen		Kaikoura		
34	Brent T Soper				
35	Dave Dick		Taupo		
36	Alastair Ramsden		Auckland Central		
37	Judy van den Yssel-Richards				
38	Barry Bryant				
39	Beth Holland				
40	Rory Cathcart				
41	Richard Griffiths				
42	Kerry Hoole		Epsom		
43	Heidi Borchardt				
44	Peter Clark				
45	Nick Harper		Wigram		
46	Carly Taylor				
47	Dale Magnus Taylor		Northland		
48	Anthony Hobbs		Invercargill		
49	Cassandra Church				
50	Julia Johnson		Owairaka		
51	Jono Baddiley				
52	Johana Sanders				
53	Brett Robinson				
54	Geoff Burnett				
55	Leanne Ireland				
56	Tim Foster				
57	Gary Young		Coromandel		
58	Karen Nicholas				
59	Layton				
60	Anna Murray				
61	Phil Clayton		Christchurch East		
62	Mark Baxter				
63	Toni-Ann Alsop				
64	David Sutcliffe		Port Waikato		
65	Graeme Cairns		Tauranga		

=== Natural Law ===
Rank	Name	Incumbency	Contesting electorate	Initial results	Later changes
1	Bryan Lee		Epsom		
2	David Lovell-Smith		Banks Peninsula		
3	John Hodgson		Pakuranga		
4	John Cleary		Hamilton East		
5	Mere Austin		Te Tai Tokerau		
6	Penelope Donovan		Ohariu-Belmont		
7	Gail Pianta		North Shore		
8	Mark Watts		Auckland Central		
9	Guy Hatchard		Whangarei		
10	Tony Martin		Palmerston North		
11	Warwick Jones		Wigram		
12	Graeme Kettle		Tāmaki		
13	Judy Boock		Waipareira		
14	Daniel Meares		Wellington Central		
15	Richard Moreham		Rongotai		
16	lan Gaustad		Otaki		
17	Mimousse Hodgson		Coromandel		
18	Bruce Brown		Wairarapa		
19	Mary-Anne McGregor		Dunedin North		
20	Graeme Lodge		Maungakiekie		
21	Mike Barthelmeh		Waimakariri		
22	Kevin O'Brien		Northcote		
23	Inga Schader		Dunedin South		
24	Lynne Patterson		Te Tai Rawhiti		
25	Kay Morgan		Waitakere		
26	Tom Hopwood		Albany		
27	Martyn Ouseley		Tukituki		
28	Andrew Sanderson		Ilam		
29	Bruce Sowry		New Plymouth		
30	Sean O'Connor		Christchurch East		
31	Raymond Cain		Christchurch Central		
32	Ian Levingston		Napier		
33	Greg Dodds		Manukau East		
34	Carolyn Drake		Otago		
35	Raylene Lodge				
36	Angela Wood		Rodney		
37	Grant Bilyard				
38	Frank Gwynne		Rotorua		
39	Michelle McGregor		Nelson		
40	Helen Treadwell		Tauranga		
41	Mark Rayner		West Coast-Tasman		
42	Selwyn Austin				
43	Kevin Harvey		Whanganui		
44	Ken Thomas		Te Tai Hauāuru		
45	Mike Dunn		Hamilton West		
46	John Blatchford		Rangitikei		
47	Belinda Hills		Karapiro		
48	Tim Irwin		Te Puku O Te Whenua		
49	Wayne Shepherd		Mana		
50	Faye McLaren		Manurewa		
51	Royal Van der Werf		Aoraki		
52	Martin Davy		Owairaka		
53	Jan Flynn		Taupo		
54	Gilbert Urquhart		Clutha-Southland		
55	Ian Smillie		Rakaia		
56	Andrew Davy				
57	Leigh Bush		Northland		
58	Anne Brigid		Kaikoura		
59	Joanna Greig		Taranaki-King Country		
60	Angela Slade		Hutt South		
61	Jacque Hughes		Invercargill		
62	Lew Cormack		Bay of Plenty		
63	Les McGrath		New Lynn		
64	Rhonda Comins		Port Waikato		
65	Lynne Lee				

=== Conservatives ===
Rank	Name	Incumbency	Contesting electorate	Initial results	Later changes
1	Trevor Rogers	Howick	Manukau East	✗ Lost seat	
2	Margaret McHugh		Otago		
3	Eric Werder		Whanganui		
4	Dennis Quirke		Rotorua		
5	Bob Vine		Taupo		
6	David Gettins				
7	Simone Graham				
8	David Lean				
9	Steve Howard				
10	Hohn Bracey				
11	John Tinsley				
12	Bill Perry				
13	Carmel Crowe				
14	Bruce Herbert				
15	Merv Jull				
16	Craig Lewis				
17	Tom Maunder				
18	Jim Howard		Rangitikei		
19	Arthur French				
20	Jerry Hohneck				

=== Superannuitants and Youth ===
Rank	Name	Incumbency	Contesting electorate	Initial results	Later changes
1	John Cronin		Waitakere		
2	Trevor Gilligan		North Shore		
3	Jack Powell		Hutt South		
4	Leslie Stroud		Hamilton East		
5	Karen Kirk				
6	Peter Little				
7	Bernon Bryne				
8	Kathleen Collinge				
9	Douglas Milne				
10	Donald Chapman				
11	Cyril Murphy				
12	Kenneth Crafar				

=== Progressive Greens ===
Rank	Name	Incumbency	Contesting electorate	Initial results	Later changes
1	Rob Fenwick		Epsom		
2	Gary Taylor				
3	Alison Davis		Wellington Central		
4	Mark Bellingham		Waitakere		
5	Laurence Boomert		Auckland Central		
6	Rodger Spiller		Tāmaki		
7	Gwenny Davis		West Coast-Tasman		
8	Eithne Hanley				
9	Peter Lee		Northcote		
10	Guy Salmon				
11	David Green		Mana		
12	Matthew Horrocks		Wairarapa		
13	Chris Marshall				
14	Bob McKegg				
15	Kevin Prime		Northland		

=== Te Tawharau ===
Rank	Name	Incumbency	Contesting electorate	Initial results	Later changes
1	Willie Coates		Te Tai Rawhiti		
2	Koro Wikeepa				
3	Hawea Vercoe		Rotorua		
4	John Maihi		Te Puku O Te Whenua		
5	Steven Te Kani		Tauranga		
6	Rangitukehu Paora		Bay of Plenty		

=== Libertarianz ===
Rank	Name	Incumbency	Contesting electorate	Initial results	Later changes
1	Lindsay Perigo		Epsom		
2	Deborah Coddington				
3	Ian Fraser				
4	Peter Cresswell				
5	Peter Eichmann				
6	Keith Patterson				
7	John Calvert				
8	Simon Fraser				
9	Nikolas Haden		Wellington Central		
10	Jessica Weddell				
11	Glenn Jameson				
12	Paul Rousell				
13	William Trolove				
14	Scott Barnett				
15	Robert White				
16	Andrew Ayling				
17	Anna Woolf				
18	Paul Hendry				
19	Don Rowberry				
20	Derek McGovern				
21	Barbara Jury				
22	Philip Petch				
23	Theo Van Oostrom				
24	Jackie Van Oostrom				
