= Albany (New Zealand electorate) =

Albany was a New Zealand electorate. It was located in north Auckland, and named after the suburb of Albany. It existed from 1978 to 1984, and then was reinstated in 1987 before its final abolition in 2002.

== Population centres ==
The 1977 electoral redistribution was the most overtly political since the Representation Commission had been established through an amendment to the Representation Act in 1886, initiated by Muldoon's National Government. As part of the 1976 census, a large number of people failed to fill out an electoral re-registration card, and census staff had not been given the authority to insist on the card being completed. This had little practical effect for people on the general roll, but it transferred Māori to the general roll if the card was not handed in. Together with a northward shift of New Zealand's population, this resulted in five new electorates having to be created in the upper part of the North Island. The electoral redistribution was very disruptive, and 22 electorates were abolished, while 27 electorates were newly created (including Albany) or re-established. These changes came into effect for the 1978 election.

The Albany electorate was centred on Albany, which had previously been part of Waitemata electorate. Its territory extended southwards to include Greenhithe and Paremoremo (also formerly part of Waitemata), plus a large portion of Glenfield (formerly split between Waitemata and East Coast Bays). It extended northwards to include Okura, Orewa, and Stanmore Bay (which were formerly part of Rodney electorate). For the 1984 election, however, the electorate was abolished. Glenfield and Greenhithe were split off to form the Glenfield electorate, and most of the remainder (including Albany itself) was absorbed into Rodney electorate.

The 1987 electoral redistribution took the continued population growth in the North Island into account, and two additional general electorates were created, bringing the total number of electorates to 97. In the South Island, the shift of population to Christchurch had continued. Overall, three electorates were newly created, three electorates were recreated (including Albany), and four electorates were abolished. All of those electorates were in the North Island. Changes in the South Island were restricted to boundary changes. These changes came into effect with the 1987 election. The Albany electorate was based around the portion of the former Albany which had been merged into Rodney, plus Greenhithe (which had become part of Glenfield). Glenfield itself remained its own electorate. The new Albany also included Hobsonville and Whenuapai, taken from West Auckland, and stretched as far north as Orewa. For the 1990 election, the electorate expanded to the west slightly, towards Kumeū, but this was effectively reversed at the 1993 election. When the transition to MMP prompted a major redistribution at the 1996 election, most of the Glenfield seat was merged into Albany, almost bringing the seat back to its original shape in 1978. It lost some ground to the west at the 1999 election. For the 2002 election, the seat was abolished once again — its western territories, including Greenhithe and Albany itself, became part of the new Helensville electorate, while the remainder was established as the new East Coast Bays electorate.

== History ==
Don McKinnon of the National Party was the first representative of the electorate. He served for two terms from 1978, and successfully contested Rodney in 1984 election.

=== Members of Parliament ===
Key

National

Election	Winner
1978 election	Don McKinnon
1981 election	Don McKinnon
(Electorate abolished 1984–1987; see Glenfield and Rodney)
1987 election	Don McKinnon
1990 election	Don McKinnon
1993 election	Don McKinnon
1996 election	Murray McCully
1999 election	Murray McCully
(Electorate abolished in 2002; see Helensville and East Coast Bays)

== Election results ==
=== 1999 election ===
1999 general election: Albany
Notes:	Blue background denotes the winner of the electorate vote. Pink background denotes a candidate elected from their party list. Yellow background denotes an electorate win by a list member, or other incumbent. A ✓ or ✗ denotes status of any incumbent, win or lose respectively.						
Party	Candidate	Votes	%	±%	Party votes	%	±%
National	✓ Murray McCully	13,701	40.18	−9.48	13,583	39.41	
Labour	Hamish McCracken	8,753	25.67	+15.10	10,271	29.80	
Alliance	Heather McConachy	3,775	11.07	−1.94	1,967	5.71	
ACT	Mike Steeneveld	2,414	7.08	+1.96	4,232	12.28	
Green	Bera MacClement	1,585	4.65		1,529	4.44	
Independent	Callum Blair	1,548	4.54				
Christian Democrats	Rob Wheeler	869	2.55		556	1.61	
NZ First	Joy Brett	751	2.20	−14.67	1,033	2.97	
Christian Heritage	Tony Corbett	665	1.95		575	1.67	
NMP	Darag Rennie	41	0.12		19	0.06	
Legalise Cannabis					243	0.71	
United NZ					233	0.68	
Libertarianz					69	0.20	
Animals First					53	0.15	
McGillicuddy Serious					45	0.13	
Natural Law					19	0.06	
One NZ					18	0.05	
Freedom Movement					5	0.01	
Mana Māori					5	0.01	
People's Choice Party					3	0.01	
Republican					3	0.01	
South Island					3	0.01	
Mauri Pacific					1	0.00	
Informal votes		512			149		
Total valid votes		34,102			34,465		
National hold	Majority	4,948	14.51	−18.28			

=== 1996 election ===
1996 general election: Albany
Notes:	Blue background denotes the winner of the electorate vote. Pink background denotes a candidate elected from their party list. Yellow background denotes an electorate win by a list member, or other incumbent. A ✓ or ✗ denotes status of any incumbent, win or lose respectively.						
Party	Candidate	Votes	%	±%	Party votes	%	±%
National	✓ Murray McCully	17,639	49.67	+11.92	15,812	44.31	
NZ First	Terry Heffernan	5,992	16.87		3,536	9.91	
Alliance	Heather McConachy	4,621	13.01		2,288	6.41	
Labour	Colin Hutchinson	3,753	10.57		7,221	20.24	
ACT	Marilyn Thomas	1,820	5.12		3,910	10.96	
Christian Coalition	Judith Phillips	942	2.65		1,603	4.49	
Progressive Green	Miles Allen	389	1.10		121	0.34	
McGillicuddy Serious	Tina Nevin	283	0.80		88	0.25	
Natural Law	Tom Hopwood	82	0.23		50	0.14	
Legalise Cannabis					507	1.42	
United NZ					303	0.85	
Ethnic Minority Party					69	0.19	
Animals First					61	0.17	
Advance New Zealand					55	0.15	
Superannuitants & Youth					18	0.05	
Green Society					16	0.04	
Libertarianz					15	0.04	
Conservatives					7	0.02	
Asia Pacific United					4	0.01	
Mana Māori					1	0.00	
Te Tawharau					0	0.00	
Informal votes		238			74		
Total valid votes		35,521			35,685		
National hold	Majority	11,647	32.79				

=== 1993 election ===
1993 general election: Albany
Party	Candidate	Votes	%	±%
National	Don McKinnon	8,166	37.75	−15.47
Alliance	Jill Jeffs	4,515	20.87	
NZ First	Toni McRae	4,300	19.88	
Labour	June Allen	3,848	17.79	−4.25
Christian Heritage	Dirk Hoek	413	1.91	
Independent	Sue Power	206	0.95	
McGillicuddy Serious	Pam Chiles	184	0.85	+0.43
Majority		3,651	16.88	−14.29
Informal votes		617	2.77	
Turnout		22,249	87.26	
Registered electors		25,497		

=== 1990 election ===
1990 general election: Albany
Party	Candidate	Votes	%	±%
National	Don McKinnon	12,726	53.22	+2.14
Labour	June Allen	5,271	22.04	
Green	Ray Galvin	4,189	17.51	
NewLabour	Bob Van Ruyssevelt	884	3.69	
Democrats	Alan McCulloch	395	1.65	
Social Credit	Alfred Jamieson	185	0.77	
Independent	Glenn Corbin	160	0.66	
McGillicuddy Serious	Pam Chiles	101	0.42	
Majority		7,455	31.17	+23.33
Turnout		23,911		

=== 1987 election ===
1987 general election: Albany
Party	Candidate	Votes	%	±%
National	Don McKinnon	10,799	51.08	
Labour	Chris Carter	9,141	43.23	
Democrats	George Thew	896	4.23	
Independent	B R H Smith	154	0.72	
NZ Party	R E Cummings	151	0.71	
Majority		1,658	7.84	
Turnout		21,141	87.79	
Registered electors		24,081		

=== 1981 election ===
1981 general election: Albany
Party	Candidate	Votes	%	±%
National	Don McKinnon	9,966	40.60	−0.38
Labour	Bryan Mockridge	8,002	32.60	
Social Credit	George Thew	6,573	26.78	+7.28
Majority		1,964	8.00	+2.48
Turnout		24,541	89.99	+18.02
Registered electors		27,268		

=== 1978 election ===
1978 general election: Albany
Party	Candidate	Votes	%	±%
National	Don McKinnon	8,597	40.98	
Labour	David Rankin	7,438	35.45	
Social Credit	George Thew	4,091	19.50	
Values	A M R Dean	543	2.58	
Independent National	C P Belton	307	1.46	
Majority		1,159	5.52	
Turnout		20,976	71.92	
Registered electors		29,165		
