= Owairaka (electorate) =

Owairaka was a New Zealand parliamentary electorate that existed for one parliamentary term from 1996 to 1999. Located in suburban Auckland, it was held by Helen Clark, who would become Prime Minister of New Zealand immediately after Owairaka was abolished.

== Population centres ==
The 1996 election was notable for the significant change of electorate boundaries, based on the provisions of the Electoral Act 1993. Because of the introduction of the mixed-member proportional (MMP) electoral system, the number of electorates had to be reduced, leading to significant changes. More than half of the electorates contested in 1996 were newly constituted, and most of the remainder had seen significant boundary changes. In total, 73 electorates were abolished, 29 electorates were newly created (including Owairaka), and 10 electorates were recreated, giving a net loss of 34 electorates.

For the 1996 election, the New Lynn electorate moved west. The Owairaka electorate gained its north-western area from what previously belonged to New Lynn. The Owairaka electorate took over the complete area that previously belonged to the Roskill electorate. The southern half of the Mount Albert electorate went to Owairaka as did the western part of the Onehunga electorate. The electorate covered a suburban part of the city of Auckland including Avondale, New Windsor, Lynfield, Hillsborough, Three Kings, the southern parts of Mount Eden, and Mount Albert.

== History ==
The electorate was established in the first mixed-member proportional (MMP) election in 1996. The election was won by Helen Clark, who had held the Mount Albert electorate since the 1981 election.

The electorate was abolished after one parliamentary term for the 1999 election. The southern half of the Owairaka electorate went to the newly established Mount Roskill electorate, whilst the northern half went to the recreated Mount Albert electorate. Clark returned to the Mount Albert electorate, which she continued to represent until her resignation in 2009. From 1999 to 2008, Clark was Prime Minister of New Zealand.

=== Members of Parliament ===
Key

Labour

Election	Winner
1996 election	Helen Clark
(Electorate abolished 1999; see Mount Roskill and Mount Albert)

== Election results ==
=== 1996 election ===
1996 general election: Owairaka
Notes:	Blue background denotes the winner of the electorate vote. Pink background denotes a candidate elected from their party list. Yellow background denotes an electorate win by a list member, or other incumbent. A ✓ or ✗ denotes status of any incumbent, win or lose respectively.						
Party	Candidate	Votes	%	±%	Party votes	%	±%
Labour	Helen Clark	16,686	51.20		11,524	35.15	
National	Phil Raffills	10,706	32.85		10,657	32.51	
NZ First	Jason Keiller	2,297	7.05		2,710	8.27	
Alliance	Keith Locke	1,775	5.45		2,576	7.86	
ACT	Andrew Couper	768	2.36		2,218	6.77	
McGillicuddy Serious	Julia Johnson	217	0.67		67	0.20	
Natural Law	Martin Davy	90	0.28		64	0.20	
Advance New Zealand	Eric Chuah	50	0.15		48	0.15	
Christian Coalition					1,664	5.08	
Legalise Cannabis					462	1.41	
Ethnic Minority Party					274	0.84	
United NZ					268	0.82	
Progressive Green					90	0.27	
Green Society					42	0.13	
Animals First					41	0.13	
Superannuitants & Youth					24	0.07	
Mana Māori					22	0.07	
Libertarianz					16	0.05	
Conservatives					10	0.03	
Asia Pacific United					7	0.02	
Te Tawharau					0	0.00	
Informal votes		429			234		
Total valid votes		32,589			32,784		
Labour win new seat	Majority	5,980	18.35				
