= Te Tai Rawhiti =

Te Tai Rawhiti (lit. 'The East Coast') was one of the five new New Zealand parliamentary Māori electorates created in 1996 for MMP. It largely replaced its English-named predecessor, Eastern Maori, though Te Tai Rawhiti's boundary was retracted significantly in the central North Island.

Te Tai Rawhiti only existed for one electoral term, and in 1999 was largely replaced by Waiariki and Ikaroa-Rāwhiti.

== Population centres ==
The electorate was based in the Bay of Plenty and East Cape regions, as well as parts of eastern Waikato, and included the following population centres:

- Edgecumbe
- Kawerau
- Morrinsville
- Murupara
- Ōpōtiki
- Putāruru
- Rotorua
- Te Aroha
- Tauranga
- Tokoroa
- Tolaga Bay
- Whakatāne

== Tribal areas ==
The electorate included the following tribal areas:

- Ngāti Ranginui
- Ngāi Te Rangi
- Te Arawa
- Ngāti Awa
- Ngāi Tūhoe
- Whakatohea
- Ngāi Tai
- Te Whānau-ā-Apanui
- Ngāti Kahungunu ki Wairoa
- Ngāti Tūwharetoa
- Ngāti Porou
- Ngāti Ruapani
- Te Aitanga-a-Hauiti

== History ==
Te Tai Rawhiti was one of the five new Māori electorates created for the 1996 election with the introduction of mixed-member proportional (MMP) representation, and which were all won by the Tight Five of New Zealand First.

In the 1999 election it was substantially replaced by Waiariki.

=== Members of Parliament ===
Key

NZ First Alliance

Election	Winner
1996 election	Tuariki Delamere

=== List MPs ===
Election	Winner
1996 election	Alamein Kopu

== Election results ==
=== 1996 election ===
1996 general election: Te Tai Rawhiti
Notes:	Blue background denotes the winner of the electorate vote. Pink background denotes a candidate elected from their party list. Yellow background denotes an electorate win by a list member, or other incumbent. A ✓ or ✗ denotes status of any incumbent, win or lose respectively.						
Party	Candidate	Votes	%	±%	Party votes	%	±%
NZ First	Tuariki Delamere	10,647	50.73		10,030	47.53	
Labour	Peter Tapsell	6,432	30.65		6,558	31.08	
Mana Māori	Tame Iti	1,372	6.54		649	3.08	
Alliance	Alamein Kopu	1,210	5.77		1,381	6.54	
National	Peta Butt	506	2.41		897	4.25	
Te Tawharau	Willie Coates	398	1.90		171	0.81	
Independent	Hinemoa Awatere	352	1.68				
Natural Law	Lynette Patterson	70	0.33		27	0.13	
Legalise Cannabis					623	2.95	
Christian Coalition					433	2.05	
ACT					188	0.89	
Progressive Green					33	0.16	
McGillicuddy Serious					27	0.13	
Animals First					25	0.12	
Green Society					19	0.09	
United NZ					15	0.07	
Superannuitants & Youth					11	0.05	
Advance New Zealand					6	0.03	
Ethnic Minority Party					4	0.02	
Asia Pacific United					2	0.01	
Conservatives					2	0.01	
Libertarianz					2	0.01	
Informal votes		322			206		
Total valid votes		20,987			21,103		
NZ First win new seat	Majority	4,215	20.08				
