= Party lists in the 2002 New Zealand general election =

New Zealand political candidates in the MMP era
Year	Party list	Candidates
1996	party lists	by electorate
1999	party lists	by electorate
2002	party lists	by electorate
2005	party lists	by electorate
2008	party lists	by electorate
2011	party lists	by electorate
2014	party lists	by electorate
2017	party lists	by electorate
2020	party lists	by electorate
2023	party lists	by electorate
2026	party lists	by electorate

This page provides the party lists put forward in New Zealand's 2002 election. Party lists determine (in the light of proportional voting) the appointment of list MPs under the mixed-member proportional (MMP) electoral system. Only registered parties are eligible for the party vote and are required to submit party lists. Unregistered parties that are only contesting electorates do not have party lists.

== Parliamentary parties ==
The following parties gained representation:

=== ACT New Zealand ===
Rank	Name	Incumbency	Contesting electorate	Previous rank	Change	Initial results	Later changes
1	Richard Prebble	List		1	0	✓ Elected from list	
2	Rodney Hide	List	Epsom	5	+3	✓ Elected from list	
3	Muriel Newman	List	Whangarei	7	+4	✓ Elected from list	
4	Stephen Franks	List	Wellington Central	3	−1	✓ Elected from list	
5	Donna Awatere Huata	List	Napier	4	−1	✓ Elected from list	✗ Left parliament in 2004
6	Deborah Coddington		North Shore	(Libertarianz: 3)	−3	✓ Elected from list	
7	Ken Shirley	List	Tamaki	2	−5	✓ Elected from list	
8	Gerry Eckhoff	List	Otago	9	+1	✓ Elected from list	
9	Heather Roy		Ohariu-Belmont	10	+1	✓ Elected from list	
10	Kenneth Wang		Mount Roskill	—	—		✓ Replaced Donna Awatere Huata in the course of the parliamentary term
11	Paul King		Banks Peninsula	37	+26		
12	Owen Jennings	List	Taranaki-King Country	6	−6	✗ Lost seat	
13	Penny Webster	List	Rodney	8	−5	✗ Lost seat	
14	Andrew Davies		Piako	14	0		
15	Dick Quax			11	−4		
16	Nigel Mattison		Ilam	17	+1		
17	David Olsen		Coromandel	—	—		
18	Willie Martin		Dunedin North	46	+28		
19	Mary Hackshaw		Port Waikato	—	—		
20	John Thompson		Clevedon	36	+16		
21	Lech Beltowski		Auckland Central	30	+9		
22	Joanne Reeder			—	—		
23	Nicholas Cairney		Waimakariri	—	—		
24	Bruce Williams		Mt Albert	—	—		
25	Gerald Trass			—	—		
26	Andrew Jollands		Pakuranga	—	—		
27	Bryce Bevin		Manurewa	—	—		
28	Ron Scott		Tauranga	—	—		
29	Diane Mulcock		Taupo	—	—		
30	Shirley Marshall		Wigram	—	—		
31	Juanita Angell		Mangere	—	—		
32	John Peters		Christchurch East	59	+27		
33	Glen Snelgar			—	—		
34	Matt Ball			—	—		
35	Ray Bassett			—	—		
36	Carl Beentjes		Rongotai	—	—		
37	Michael Coote			25	−12		
38	Brian George Dawson		Hamilton East	—	—		
39	Dianne Dawson		Northcote	—	—		
40	Ted Erskine-Legget		Te Atatu	—	—		
41	Simon Antony Ewing-Jarvie		Mana	—	—		
42	Ted Howard		Kaikoura	—	—		
43	Elizabeth Hurley			—	—		
44	Dorothy King			—	—		
45	Chris Newman			—	—		
46	Chris O'Brien			—	—		
47	Julie Pepper		East Coast Bays	—	—		
48	Peter Phiskie		Invercargill	—	—		
49	John Riddell		Waitakere	—	—		
50	Robin Roodt		Maungakiekie	—	—		
51	Ian Sage		Otaki	—	—		
52	Greg Sneddon		Rakaia	—	—		
53	Graham Douglas Steenson		Bay of Plenty	—	—		
54	Ian Swan		East Coast	47	−7		
55	Peter Talbot-King			—	—		
56	Anthony Watson		Christchurch Central	—	—		
57	John Waugh		Rangitikei	—	—		
58	Roland Weber			—	—		
59	Trevor West		New Lynn	57	−2		
60	Smilie Wood		Northland	45	−15		

=== Green Party ===
Rank	Name	Incumbency	Contesting electorate	Previous rank	Change	Initial results	Later changes
1	Jeanette Fitzsimons	Electorate	Coromandel	1	0	✓ Elected from list	
2	Rod Donald	List	Banks Peninsula	2	0	✓ Elected from list	
3	Sue Bradford	List	Rodney	4	+1	✓ Elected from list	
4	Nándor Tánczos	List	Auckland Central	5	+1	✓ Elected from list	
5	Sue Kedgley	List	Wellington Central	6	+1	✓ Elected from list	
6	Ian Ewen-Street	List	Kaikoura	3	−3	✓ Elected from list	
7	Keith Locke	List	Epsom	7	0	✓ Elected from list	
8	Metiria Turei		Tamaki Makaurau	(McGillicuddy Serious: 27)	+19	✓ Elected from list	
9	Mike Ward		Nelson	8	−1	✓ Elected from list	
10	Catherine Delahunty		East Coast	—	—		
11	Roland Sapsford			—	—		
12	Meriel Anne Watts		Waitakere	—	—		
13	Jon Carapiet		Mt Albert	51	+38		
14	Richard Davies		West Coast-Tasman	10	−4		
15	Celia Wade-Brown		Rongotai	29	+14		
16	Cathy Olsen		Hamilton East	—	—		
17	Russel Norman		Rimutaka	—	—		
18	Janine McVeagh		Northland	9	−9		
19	Steffan Browning			—	—		
20	Dayle Belcher		Clutha-Southland	—	—		
21	Kei Clendon			—	—		
22	Craig Potton			28	+6		
23	David Musgrave		Aoraki	—	—		
24	Deborah Martin			—	—		
25	Te Ruruanga Te Keeti		Bay of Plenty	—	—		
26	Steve Abel		Mangere	27	+1		
27	Sarah Millington		Wairarapa	—	—		
28	Calvin Green		Whangarei	—	—		
29	Caro Henckels			—	—		
30	Fliss Butcher		Dunedin South	—	—		
31	Peter Berger		New Plymouth	—	—		
32	Hana Blackmore		Tamaki	—	—		
33	Gareth Bodle		Ohariu-Belmont	—	—		
34	Paul Bruce			—	—		
35	Craig Carson		Invercargill	44	+9		
36	Terry Creighton		Napier	—	—		
37	Jan Davey			—	—		
38	Paul De Spa		Wigram	—	—		
39	Pip Direen		Dunedin North	37	−2		
40	Ian Douglas		Tauranga	—	—		
41	Gaye Dyson			—	—		
42	Jeanette Elley		East Coast Bays	—	—		
43	Don Fairley		Maungakiekie	—	—		
44	Nick Fisher		Taupo	52	+8		
45	Jo Francis			—	—		
46	Richard Green		North Shore	—	—		
47	Caroline Greig		Otaki	—	—		
48	Lois Griffiths		Ilam	(Alliance: 47)	−1		
49	Perce Harpham		Hutt South	—	—		
50	David Hill			—	—		
51	Laurie Hoverd		Taranaki-King Country	—	—		
52	Stephen Lee		Piako	—	—		
53	Kate Lowe			—	—		
54	Paul Lowe			—	—		
55	Rachel Mackintosh		Northcote	—	—		
56	Mary McCammon		Christchurch East	—	—		
57	Margaret Mckenzie		Palmerston North	—	—		
58	Olivia Mitchell		Mana	—	—		
59	Matt Morris		Christchurch Central	—	—		
60	Chris Norton-Brown		Hamilton West	—	—		
61	Fraser Palmer-Hesketh		Rakaia	—	—		
62	Di Pennell			23	−39		
63	David Rose		Pakuranga	47	−16		
64	Christiaan Briggs			—	—		
65	Jane Williams		Port Waikato	—	—		

=== Jim Anderton's Progressive Coalition ===
Rank	Name	Incumbency	Contesting electorate	Previous rank	Change	Initial results	Later changes
1	Jim Anderton	Electorate	Wigram	(Alliance: 1)	0	✓ Won Wigram	
2	Matt Robson	List	Manukau East	(Alliance: 3)	+1	✓ Elected from list	
3	Grant Gillon	List	Northcote	(Alliance: 7)	+4	✗ Lost seat	
4	John Wright	List	Waimakariri	(Alliance: 4)	0	✗ Lost seat	
5	Stephnie de Ruyter		Invercargill	(Alliance: 22)	+17		
6	Peter Campbell		Te Tai Tokerau	—	—		
7	Rosie Brown		Mangere	—	—		
8	Meng Ly		Pakuranga	—	—		
9	Susi Pa'o Williams		Manurewa	—	—		
10	Jill Henry		East Coast Bays	—	—		
11	Phil Clearwater		Banks Peninsula	—	—		
12	David Angus Wilson		Whangarei	(Alliance: 39)	+27		
13	Sue Elizabeth Wharewaka-Topia Watts		Tamaki Makaurau	—	—		
14	Pasene Tauialo-o-lilomaiava		Te Atatu	—	—		
15	Nong Li		Tamaki	—	—		
16	John Pemberton		Piako	(Alliance: 37)	+21		
17	Bruce Parr		Whanganui	—	—		
18	Vivienne Shepherd		Auckland Central	—	—		
19	Trevor Barnard		Mt Roskill	(Alliance: 18)	−1		
20	Russell Franklin		Otaki	—	—		
21	Annette Anderson		Coromandel	—	—		
22	Adrian Bayly		Nelson	—	—		
23	Victor Bradley		Taupo	—	—		
24	Lyndsay Brock		North Shore	—	—		
25	Robert Bryan		Rimutaka	—	—		
26	Christine Cheesman		Rakaia	—	—		
27	Fleur Churton		Christchurch Central	—	—		
28	David Culverhouse		Christchurch East	—	—		
29	Jamie Daly		Rongotai	—	—		
30	Clare Dickson		Helensville	—	—		
31	Bob Fox		West Coast-Tasman	—	—		
32	Russell Edwards		Dunedin South	—	—		
33	David Espin		Rotorua	—	—		
34	Bill Henderson		Wairarapa	—	—		
35	Steven Charles Ihaia		New Plymouth	—	—		
36	Frede Jorgensen		Dunedin North	—	—		
37	Te Pare Joseph		Tainui	(Alliance: 44)	+7		
38	Doreen Henderson		Mana	—	—		
39	Toni Jowsey		Ikaroa-Rawhiti	—	—		
40	Peter David Kane		Northland	—	—		
41	Christine Kerr		Ohariu-Belmont	—	—		
42	John Kilbride		Taranaki-King Country	—	—		
43	Martin Lawrence		Rodney	—	—		
44	Doug McCallum		New Lynn	—	—		
45	Philippa Main		Kaikoura	—	—		
46	John Neill		Bay of Plenty	(Alliance: 55)	+9		
47	Garry Oster		Tauranga	—	—		
48	Ram Parkash		Port Waikato	—	—		
49	David Parkyn		Waitakere	—	—		
50	Dawn Patchett		Maungakiekie	—	—		
51	Bob Peck		Ilam	—	—		
52	Jim Medland		Hamilton East	—	—		
53	Rob Shirley		Hamilton West	—	—		
54	Lynley Simmons		Aoraki	(Alliance: 51)	−3		
55	Heather Marion Smith		Rangitikei	—	—		
56	Arthur Toms		Clevedon	—	—		
57	Gillian Dance		Mt Albert	—	—		
58	Hessel Van Wieren		Otago	—	—		
59	Ross Weddell		Hutt South	—	—		
60	Roger White		Clutha-Southland	—	—		
61	Barry Pulford		Tukituki	—	—		

=== Labour Party ===
Rank	Name	Incumbency	Contesting electorate	Previous rank	Change	Initial results	Later changes
1	Helen Clark	Electorate	Mount Albert	1	0	✓ Won Mount Albert	
2	Michael Cullen	List		2	0	✓ Elected from list	
3	Jonathan Hunt	List		6	+3	✓ Elected from list	✗ Left parliament in 2005
4	Steve Maharey	Electorate	Palmerston North	3	−1	✓ Won Palmerston North	
5	Parekura Horomia	Electorate	Ikaroa-Rāwhiti	25	+20	✓ Won Ikaroa-Rāwhiti	
6	Phil Goff	Electorate	Mount Roskill	7	+1	✓ Won Mount Roskill	
7	Annette King	Electorate	Rongotai	4	−3	✓ Won Rongotai	
8	Jim Sutton	Electorate	Aoraki	11	+3	✓ Won Aoraki	
9	Margaret Wilson	List	Tauranga	9	0	✓ Elected from list	
10	Mark Gosche	Electorate	Maungakiekie	20	+10	✓ Won Maungakiekie	
11	Dover Samuels	Electorate	Te Tai Tokerau	5	−6	✓ Won Te Tai Tokerau	
12	Trevor Mallard	Electorate	Hutt South	12	0	✓ Won Hutt South	
13	Pete Hodgson	Electorate	Dunedin North	13	0	✓ Won Dunedin North	
14	Lianne Dalziel	Electorate	Christchurch East	8	−6	✓ Won Christchurch East	
15	George Hawkins	Electorate	Manurewa	—	—	✓ Won Manurewa	
16	Mark Burton	Electorate	Taupo	18	+2	✓ Won Taupo	
17	Marian Hobbs	Electorate	Wellington Central	23	+6	✓ Won Wellington Central	
18	Paul Swain	Electorate	Rimutaka	26	+8	✓ Won Rimutaka	
19	Nanaia Mahuta	Electorate	Tainui	10	−9	✓ Won Tainui	
20	Luamanuvao Winnie Laban	List	Mana	33	+13	✓ Won Mana	
21	Judith Tizard	Electorate	Auckland Central	19	−2	✓ Won Auckland Central	
22	Ruth Dyson	Electorate	Banks Peninsula	15	−7	✓ Won Banks Peninsula	
23	Georgina Beyer	Electorate	Wairarapa	40	+17	✓ Won Wairarapa	
24	Rick Barker	Electorate	Tukituki	31	+7	✓ Won Tukituki	
25	Chris Carter	Electorate	Te Atatu	34	+9	✓ Won Te Atatu	
26	Graham Kelly	Electorate		17	−9	✓ Elected from list	✗ Left parliament in 2003
27	Jill Pettis	Electorate	Whanganui	24	−3	✓ Won Whanganui	
28	Mark Peck	Electorate	Invercargill	27	−1	✓ Won Invercargill	
29	Dianne Yates	List	Hamilton East	22	−7	✓ Won Hamilton East	
30	Helen Duncan	List	North Shore	30	0	✓ Elected from list	
31	Martin Gallagher	Electorate	Hamilton West	—	—	✓ Won Hamilton West	
32	Mita Ririnui	Electorate	Waiariki	47	+15	✓ Won Waiariki	
33	Mahara Okeroa	Electorate	Te Tai Tonga	—	—	✓ Won Te Tai Tonga	
34	Steve Chadwick	Electorate	Rotorua	43	+9	✓ Won Rotorua	
35	Ann Hartley	Electorate	Northcote	35	0	✓ Won Northcote	
36	David Benson-Pope	Electorate	Dunedin South	54	+18	✓ Won Dunedin South	
37	David Cunliffe	Electorate	New Lynn	53	+16	✓ Won New Lynn	
38	Dave Hereora		Clevedon	—	—	✓ Elected from list	
39	Lynne Pillay		Waitakere	36	−3	✓ Won Waitakere	
40	Ashraf Choudhary			41	+1	✓ Elected from list	
41	Moana Mackey			—	—		✓ Replaced Graham Kelly in the course of the parliamentary term
42	Lesley Soper		Clutha-Southland	44	+2		✓ Replaced Jonathan Hunt in the course of the parliamentary term
43	Carol Beaumont			—	—		
44	Max Purnell		Coromandel	64	+20		
45	David Shearer		Whangarei	62	+17		
46	Gill Boddy-Greer		Ohariu-Belmont	—	—		
47	David Parker		Otago	—	—	✓ Won Otago	
48	Brendon Burns		Kaikoura	—	—		
49	Louisa Wall			—	—		
50	David Maka			—	—		
51	Darren Hughes		Otaki	—	—	✓ Won Otaki	
52	Hamish McCracken		East Coast Bays	60	+8		
53	Eamon Daly			—	—		
54	Lesley Harry		Port Waikato	—	—		
55	Brenda Lowe-Johnson			42	−13		
56	Steven Ching			—	—		
57	Leila Boyle		Tamaki	—	—		
58	John Cheesman			—	—		
59	Richard Pole		Ilam	—	—		
60	Paul Gibson			—	—		
61	Margaret Hayward		Rangitikei	—	—		
62	Di Nash		Epsom	—	—		
63	Denise Mackenzie			—	—		
64	Judy Hawkins		Taranaki-King Country	—	—		
65	Dinesh Tailor			—	—		
66	Kath Peebles			—	—		
67	Mike Mora		Wigram	—	—		
68	Yani Johanson			65	−3		
69	Nathan Saminathan			—	—		
70	Ola Kamel			—	—		
71	Jan Noonan			—	—		
72	Maureen Waaka			—	—		
73	Lyndsay Rackley			—	—		
74	Wayne Hawker			—	—		

=== National Party ===
The National Party had 65 candidates on their list.

Rank	Name	Incumbency	Contesting electorate	Previous rank	Change	Initial results	Later changes
1	Bill English	Clutha-Southland	Clutha-Southland	4	+3	✓ Won Clutha-Southland	
2	Roger Sowry	List	Otaki	7	+5	✓ Elected from list	
3	Nick Smith	Nelson	Nelson	8	+5	✓ Won Nelson	
4	David Carter	List	Banks Peninsula	21	+17	✓ Elected from list	
5	Don Brash			—	—	✓ Elected from list	
6	Georgina te Heuheu	List		6	0	✓ Elected from list	
7	Wayne Mapp	North Shore	North Shore	33	+26	✓ Won North Shore	
8	Tony Ryall	Bay of Plenty	Bay of Plenty	9	+1	✓ Won Bay of Plenty	
9	Gerry Brownlee	Ilam	Ilam	36	+27	✓ Won Ilam	
10	Pansy Wong	List	Auckland Central	11	+1	✓ Elected from list	
11	Lockwood Smith	Rodney	Rodney	5	−6	✓ Won Rodney	
12	Lynda Scott	Kaikoura	Kaikoura	56	+44	✓ Won Kaikoura	
13	Simon Power	Rangitikei	Rangitikei	37	+24	✓ Won Rangitikei	
14	Katherine Rich	List	Dunedin North	23	+9	✓ Elected from list	
15	Hekia Parata		Wellington Central	—	—		
16	Gavan Herlihy	Otago	Otago	32	+16	✗ Lost seat	
17	Bob Simcock	List	Hamilton West	22	+5	✗ Lost seat	
18	Allan Peachey			—	—		
19	Sue Wood		Mana	—	—		
20	Guy Salmon			—	—		
21	John Carter	Northland	Northland	16	−5	✓ Won Northland	
22	Alec Neill	List	Wigram	26	+4	✗ Lost seat	
23	Belinda Vernon	List	Maungakiekie	10	−13	✗ Lost seat	
24	Anne Tolley	List	Napier	20	−4	✗ Lost seat	
25	Richard Worth	Epsom	Epsom	44	+19	✓ Won Epsom	
26	Eric Roy	List	Invercargill	19	−7	✗ Lost seat	
27	Paul Hutchison	Port Waikato	Port Waikato	38	+11	✓ Won Port Waikato	
28	Arthur Anae	List	Manukau East	25	−3	✗ Lost seat	
29	Ian Buchanan		Wairarapa	—	—		
30	Greg White		Te Tai Hauāuru	—	—		
31	Phil Heatley	Whangarei	Whangarei	42	+11	✓ Won Whangarei	
32	Marie Hasler	List	Waitakere	24	−8	✗ Lost seat	
33	Annabel Young	List		18	−15	✗ Lost seat	
34	Eric Liu			—	—		
35	Tau Henare	(Former MP)	Te Atatu	(Mauri Pacific: 1)	−34		
36	Chester Borrows		Whanganui	45	+9		
37	Nicky Wagner		Christchurch Central	—	—		
38	Leanne Jensen-Daines		East Coast	—	—		
39	Tim Macindoe		Tauranga	52	+13		
40	Wayne Marriott		Aoraki	50	+10		
41	Dan Gordon		Waimakariri	—	—		
42	Sandra Goudie		Coromandel	—	—	✓ Won Coromandel	
43	John Key		Helensville	—	—	✓ Won Helensville	
44	Jeremy Sole		Northcote	—	—		
45	George Ngatai		Tamaki Makaurau	46	+1		
46	Dale Stephens		Ohariu-Belmont	40	−6		
47	Craig Foss		Tukituki	—	—		
48	Judith Collins		Clevedon	—	—	✓ Won Clevedon	
49	Glenda Hughes		Rongotai	—	—		
50	Dave Scott		Palmerston North	—	—		
51	Weston Kirton		Taupo	—	—		
52	Hamuera Mitchell		Waiariki	—	—		
53	Enosa Auva'a		Manurewa	47	−6		
54	Sylvia Taylor		Mangere	—	—		
55	Barry Nicolle		West Coast-Tasman	—	—		
56	Paul Foster-Bell		Dunedin South	—	—		
57	Mita Harris		Te Tai Tokerau	—	—		
58	Brent Trewheela		Mount Roskill	—	—		
59	Raewyn Bhana		Mount Albert	—	—		
60	Bill Karaitiana		Te Tai Tonga	—	—		
61	Geoff Horton		New Plymouth	—	—		
62	Rodney Williams			—	—		
63	Alan Delamere		Ikaroa-Rāwhiti	—	—		
64	Peter O'Brien			—	—		
65	Rod O'Beirne			49	−16		

=== New Zealand First ===
Rank	Name	Incumbency	Contesting electorate	Previous rank	Change	Initial results	Later changes
1	Winston Peters	Tauranga	Tauranga	1	0	✓ Won Tauranga	
2	Peter Brown	List	Bay of Plenty	2	0	✓ Elected from list	
3	Brian Donnelly	List	Whangarei	3	0	✓ Elected from list	
4	Ron Mark	List	Waimakariri	4	0	✓ Elected from list	
5	Doug Woolerton	List	Hamilton East	5	0	✓ Elected from list	
6	Barbara Stewart		North Shore	—	—	✓ Elected from list	
7	Pita Paraone		Pakuranga	19	+12	✓ Elected from list	
8	Craig McNair		Rodney	—	—	✓ Elected from list	
9	Jim Peters		Northland	—	—	✓ Elected from list	
10	Dail Jones	(Former MP)	Helensville	—	—	✓ Elected from list	
11	Edwin Perry		Wairarapa	37	+26	✓ Elected from list	
12	Bill Gudgeon		Hamilton West	25	+13	✓ Elected from list	
13	Brent Catchpole		Clevedon	30	+17	✓ Elected from list	
14	Rob Harris		Wellington Central	15	+1		
15	Dawn Mullins		Mount Roskill	39	+24		
16	Brett Webster		Tamaki	—	—		
17	Gordon Stewart		Piako	28	+11		
18	Fletcher Tabuteau		Rotorua	—	—		
19	Bob Daw		Port Waikato	—	—		
20	Dave Mackie		Clutha-Southland	24	+4		
21	John Riley		North Shore	—	—		
22	John Geary		Manurewa	—	—		

=== United Future ===
Rank	Name	Incumbency	Contesting electorate	Previous rank	Change	Initial results	Later changes
1	Peter Dunne	Ohariu-Belmont	Ohariu-Belmont	(United NZ: 1)	0	✓ Won Ohariu-Belmont	
2	Gordon Copeland		Rongotai	—	—	✓ Elected from list	
3	Bernie Ogilvy		Mount Roskill	—	—	✓ Elected from list	
4	Marc Alexander		Ilam	—	—	✓ Elected from list	
5	Kelly Chal		Manukau East	—	—		Withdrew from party list before official result published due to ineligibility
6	Murray Smith		Hutt South	(Future NZ: 3)	−3	✓ Elected from list	
7	Larry Baldock		Tauranga	(Future NZ: 9)	+2	✓ Elected from list	
8	Judy Turner		East Coast	(Future NZ: 14)	+6	✓ Elected from list	
9	Paul Adams		East Coast Bays	—	—	✓ Elected from list	
10	Wayne Chapman		Rimutaka	(Future NZ: 15)	+5		
11	Andrew Kubala		Wigram	—	—		
12	Gray Eatwell		West Coast-Tasman	—	—		
13	Bruce McGrail		Tamaki	(Future NZ: 17)	+4		
14	Hassan Hosseini		Mount Albert	—	—		
15	Craig Hunt		Rodney	(Future NZ: 20)	+5		
16	Kevin Harper		Maungakiekie	(Future NZ: 8)	−8		
17	Russell Judd		Rotorua	—	—		
18	Anne Drake		Te Atatu	(Future NZ: 24)	+6		
19	Ian McInnes		Pakuranga	—	—		
20	Graham Butterworth		Mana	(United NZ: 7)	−13		
21	Andrea Deeth		Helensville	—	—		
22	Cindy Ruakere		Epsom	—	—		
23	Chris Bretton		Piako	—	—		
24	Susanne Fellner		New Lynn	—	—		
25	Jim Howard		Rangitikei	(United NZ: 5)	−20		
26	Martyn Seddon		Hamilton West	(Future NZ: 25)	−1		
27	Tom Smithers		New Plymouth	(Future NZ: 12)	−15		
28	Ross Tizard		North Shore	—	—		
29	Grant Bowater		Palmerston North	(Future NZ: 5)	−24		
30	Steve Taylor		Auckland Central	—	—		
31	Graham Turner		Napier	—	—		
32	Dave Fitness		Port Waikato	—	—		
33	Paul Duxbury		Christchurch East	—	—		
34	Richard Carter		Hamilton East	—	—		
35	Lee Edmonds		Tainui	—	—		
36	Stephen Russell		Christchurch Central	—	—		
37	Sharee Adams		Northcote	—	—		
38	Lee Robertson		Coromandel	—	—		
39	Rachel Smithers		Taranaki-King Country	—	—		
40	Rob Moodie		Wellington Central	—	—		
41	Witana Murray		Te Tai Tonga	(Future NZ: 21)	−20		
42	Frank Owen		Wairarapa	(United NZ: 13)	−29		
43	Graeme Torckler		Waitakere	—	—		
44	Denis Gilmore		Taupo	—	—		
45	Andrew Smith		Waimakariri	—	—		
46	Tony Bunting		Aoraki	—	—		
47	Graeme Barr		Rakaia	—	—		
48	James Hippolite		Te Tai Hauāuru	—	—		
49	Mike Mitcalfe		Northland	—	—		
50	Stephanie McEwin		Banks Peninsula	—	—		
51	Bruce Settle		Māngere	—	—		
52	Peter Collins		Manurewa	—	—		
53	Todd Whitcombe		Dunedin North	—	—		
54	Joy Lietze		Clutha-Southland	—	—		
55	Gray Phillips		Whangarei	(United NZ: 14)	−41		
56	Chris Collier		Whanganui	—	—		
57	Allan Smellie		Otago	—	—		
58	Jesse O'Brien		Dunedin South	—	—		
59	Julee Smith-Mischeski		Kaikoura	—	—		
60	Vince Smith		Invercargill	—	—		
61	Dennis Wells		Nelson	—	—		

== Unsuccessful registered parties ==
The following registered parties did not gain representation:

=== Alliance ===
Rank	Name	Incumbency	Contesting electorate	Previous rank	Change	Initial results	Later changes
1	Laila Harré	List	Waitakere	6	+5	✗ Lost seat	
2	Willie Jackson	List	Tainui	9	+7	✗ Lost seat	
3	Matt McCarten			—	—		
4	Liz Gordon	List	Christchurch Central	8	+4	✗ Lost seat	
5	Tricia Cutforth		Whangarei	19	+14		
6	Gerard Hehir		New Lynn	15	+9		
7	Vern Winitana		Te Tai Tonga	24	+17		
8	Rebecca Matthews		Ohariu-Belmont	31	+23		
9	Mike Treen		Auckland Central	36	+27		
10	Naida Glavish		Te Tai Tokerau	—	—		
11	Robert Reid		Wellington Central	—	—		
12	Jill Ovens		Mount Albert	28	+16		
13	Sam Huggard		Otago	—	—		
14	Janice Panoho-Smith		Tamaki Makaurau	—	—		
15	Vernon Tile		Rongotai	23	+8		
16	Julie Fairey		Epsom	—	—		
17	Gavin Maclean		East Coast	33	+16		
18	Carolyn Payne-Harker		Dunedin North	—	—		
19	Kamaka Manuel		Te Tai Hauauru	—	—		
20	Mary O'Connor		Nelson	32	+12		
21	Maxine Boag		Napier	—	—		
22	Moira Lawler		Rimutaka	—	—		
23	Len Richards		Mangere	—	—		
24	Ravaani Ghaemmaghamy		Hamilton East	—	—		
25	John Tuwhakairiora Tibble		Ikaroa-Rawhiti	—	—		
26	Anna McMartin		Invercargill	—	—		
27	Anna Sutherland		Hutt South	46	+19		
28	Hayley Rawhiti		Manurewa	—	—		
29	Joseph Randall		Maungakiekie	—	—		
30	Sean Gourley		Wigram	—	—		
31	Peter Wheeler		Palmerston North	—	—		
32	Val McClimont		Banks Peninsula	—	—		
33	Margaret Jeune		Otaki	—	—		
34	Dion Martin		Rangitikei	34	0		
35	Paula Henderson		Rodney	—	—		
36	Brendon Lane		Mount Roskill	—	—		
37	Peter Jamieson		Piako	38	+1		
38	Fiona McLaren		East Coast Bays	—	—		
39	Solly Southwood		Northcote	—	—		
40	Michael Gilchrist		Mana	—	—		
41	Paul Protheroe		Pakuranga	—	—		
42	Justin Wilson		Dunedin South	—	—		
43	Karl Bartleet		North Shore	—	—		
44	Richard Wallis		Tukituki	—	—		
45	Simon Shields		Manukau East	—	—		
46	Craig Wills		Hamilton West	—	—		
47	Helen Mackinlay		Helensville	—	—		
48	Robert Van Ruyssevelt		Te Atatu	—	—		

=== Aotearoa Legalise Cannabis Party ===
Rank	Name	Incumbency	Contesting electorate	Previous rank	Change	Initial results	Later changes
1	Michael Appleby		Wellington Central	1	0		
2	Mike Britnell		Christchurch East	9	+7		
3	Irinka Britnell			—	—		
4	Dave Moore		Mana	4	0		
5	Christine Mitchell		Aoraki	14	+9		
6	Jeanette Saxby		Christchurch Central	5	−1		
7	Paul McMullan		Dunedin North	7	0		
8	Judy Daniels		Northland	—	—		
9	Judy Matangi			—	—		
10	Paula Lambert			—	—		
11	Sugra Morley			—	—		
12	Peter Green			—	—		

=== Christian Heritage Party ===
Rank	Name	Incumbency	Contesting electorate	Previous rank	Change	Initial results	Later changes
1	Graham Capill			1	0		
2	Merepeka Raukawa-Tait		Wairarapa	—	—		
3	Vic Pollard		Christchurch Central	—	—		
4	Dick Holland		Bay of Plenty	10	+6		
5	Vic Jarvis		Palmerston North	8	+3		
6	Gerald Barker		Banks Peninsula	—	—		
7	Ken Munn		Rimutaka	—	—		
8	Roger Payne		Rakaia	—	—		
9	Ruth Jarvis		Rangitikei	—	—		
10	Nick Barber		Nelson	17	+7		
11	Gavin Denby		Hamilton East	(ACT: 51)	+40		
12	Chris Salt		Ohariu-Belmont	15	+3		
13	Ian Cummings		East Coast Bays	—	—		
14	Grant Bradfield		Clutha-Southland	12	−2		
15	McGregor Simpson		Aoraki	22	+7		
16	Rod Harris		Whangarei	31	+15		
17	Margaret Burgess		Tukituki	35	+18		
18	Mike Ferguson		Otago	30	+12		
19	Matthew Flannagan		Te Atatu	—	—		
20	Madeleine Jane Flannagan		Waitakere	20	0		

=== Mana Maori Movement ===
Rank	Name	Incumbency	Contesting electorate	Previous rank	Change	Initial results	Later changes
1	Angeline Greensill		Tainui	3	+2		
2	Ken Mair		Te Tai Hauāuru	7	+5		
3	Glenis Philip-Barbara		Ikaroa-Rāwhiti	—	—		
4	Tame Iti			1	−3		
5	Jacqui Amohanga		Te Tai Tonga	—	—		
6	Rihi Vercoe		Waiariki	—	—		
7	Mere Takoko			—	—		
8	Tanima Bernard			—	—		
9	Colleen Skerrett-White			—	—		
10	Piripi Haami			—	—		
11	Ngahape Lomax			22	+11		
12	Sharon Pehi-Barlow			—	—		

=== NMP ===
Rank	Name	Incumbency	Contesting electorate	Previous rank	Change	Initial results	Later changes
1	Graham Mark Atkin			6	+5		
2	Brett K Gifkins			12	+10		

=== OneNZ Party ===
Rank	Name	Incumbency	Contesting electorate	Previous rank	Change	Initial results	Later changes
1	John Porter		Tukituki	—	—		
2	Jim White		Palmerston North	—	—		
3	Alan McCulloch		East Coast Bays	—	—		
4	Janet White		Mana	—	—		
5	Richard Fisher		Otaki	—	—		
6	David Moat		East Coast	—	—		
7	Walter Christie			—	—		
8	Gill Edwards			—	—		
9	Peter Grove		Rimutaka	—	—		
10	John Bull		Napier	—	—		

=== Outdoor Recreation NZ ===
Rank	Name	Incumbency	Contesting electorate	Initial results	Later changes
1	Lester Roy Phelps				
2	David John O'Neill				
3	Paul Check				
4	Warren George Sinclair				
5	Henry Joseph Willems				
6	Peter Michael Ellery				
7	Edwin Laurence Sylva				
8	James Neil Cook				
9	Peter Kenneth Richard Gibbons				
10	Michael Francis Holmes				
11	James Rudd				
12	Harry Ernest Bimler				
