= Remutaka (electorate) =

- Single-member general constituency for the New Zealand House of Representatives
- Interactive map of boundaries from the 2026 election
- Formation: 1996
- Region: Wellington
- Character: Urban and suburban
- Term: 3 years

Member for Remutaka
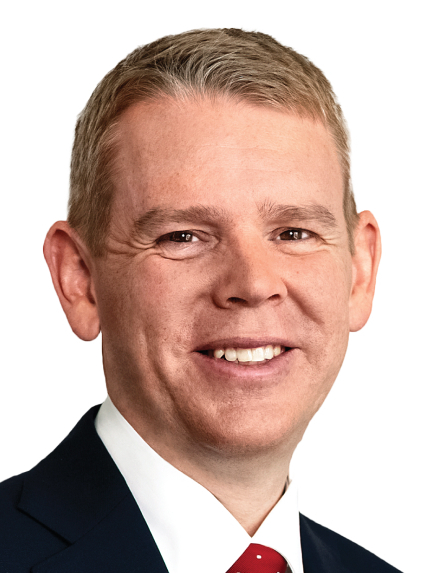
- Chris Hipkins since 8 November 2008
- Party: Labour
- Previous MP: Paul Swain (Labour)
Party vote distribution

Remutaka (spelled Rimutaka until 2020) is an electorate returning one member to the New Zealand House of Representatives. Since the 2008 general election, the seat has been represented by Chris Hipkins, who served as Prime Minister of New Zealand and is currently the Leader of the Opposition.

== Profile ==
Centred on Upper Hutt City, and bisected by State Highway 2 and the Hutt River, the Remutaka electorate stretches from the Lower Hutt suburbs of Avalon and Naenae in the south, via Taitā, Stokes Valley, and Manor Park, through Silverstream, Trentham, and Upper Hutt Central, to Akatarawa, Te Mārua, and Kaitoke in the north.

Of those employed at the 2018 census, 13.7% were clerical and administrative workers (the highest proportion of any general electorate), 11.3% were community and personal service workers (the sixth-highest), and 11.3% worked in the public administration and safety sector (the third-highest share). The main means of travel to work for 12.5% of the employed population of Remutaka was by train, the third-highest share among general electorates and over six times the New Zealand average (2.0%).

== History ==
Rimutaka was created in 1996 ahead of the change to Mixed Member Proportional voting. It was created by merging the old Upper Hutt-based seat of Heretaunga with Stokes Valley, Taitā and a large section of Naenae from the defunct Eastern Hutt seat. Eastern Hutt had been held by Labour's Paul Swain since 1990, while Heretaunga had been won by National's Peter McCardle in 1990. Peter McCardle (who had been re-elected in 1993) defected to New Zealand First in 1996. Swain was the clear winner in every election from 1996 to 2005; the inclusion of the working-class areas of Hutt City helped make Rimutaka safer for the Labour Party, though on the campaign trail in 2008, Labour's chances for winning both party vote and the electorate were summarised as: "Labour support is 'rock solid' in the south of the electorate but things are volatile in Upper Hutt, where there is 'still work to do'".

Following the 2014 boundary review, Rimutaka gained Naenae and a small part of Epuni from the Hutt South electorate and lost Kelson and Belmont to Hutt South.

Map of boundaries at the 2020 and 2023 general elections

Following the 2016 Treaty of Waitangi settlement between the Crown and Rangitāne o Wairarapa and Ngāti Kahungunu ki Wairarapa Tāmaki Nui-ā-Rua, the electorate's namesake Rimutaka Range was renamed to the Remutaka Range. In the 2019/2020 boundary review, the Representation Commission renamed the electorate Remutaka in line with this name change.

In the 2025 boundary review, the electorate would expand southwestwards, gaining Fairfield and part of Boulcott from Hutt South.

=== Members of Parliament ===
Unless otherwise stated, all MPs terms began and ended at general elections.

Key

Labour NZ First

| Election | Winner |
|---|---|
| 1996 election | Paul Swain |
| 1999 election | Paul Swain |
| 2002 election | Paul Swain |
| 2005 election | Paul Swain |
| 2008 election | Chris Hipkins |
| 2011 election | Chris Hipkins |
| 2014 election | Chris Hipkins |
| 2017 election | Chris Hipkins |
| 2020 election | Chris Hipkins |
| 2023 election | Chris Hipkins |
| 2026 election | Chris Hipkins |

=== List MPs ===
Members of Parliament elected from party lists in elections where that person also unsuccessfully contested the Rimutaka electorate. Unless otherwise stated, all MPs terms began and ended at general elections.

| Election | Winner |
|---|---|
| 1996 election | Peter McCardle^{1} |

^{1} McCardle was the National MP for Heretaunga from 1990 to 1996

== Election results ==
=== 2026 election ===
The next election will be held on 7 November 2026. Candidates for Remutaka are listed at Candidates in the 2026 New Zealand general election by electorate § Remutaka. Official results will be available after 27 November 2026.

=== 2023 election ===
2023 general election: Remutaka
| Notes: | Blue background denotes the winner of the electorate vote. Pink background denotes a candidate elected from their party list. Yellow background denotes an electorate win by a list member, or other incumbent. A ✓ or ✗ denotes status of any incumbent, win or lose respectively. | | | | | | |
| Party | Candidate | Votes | % | ±% | Party votes | % | ±% |
|---|---|---|---|---|---|---|---|
| Labour | ✓ Chris Hipkins | 22,344 | 53.58 | −14.99 | 16,000 | 36.84 | −21.53 |
| National | Emma Chatterton | 13,485 | 32.34 | +11.88 | 12,726 | 29.30 | +10.25 |
| Green | Chris Norton | 2,794 | 6.70 | +2.92 | 5,068 | 11.66 | +4.51 |
| ACT | Michael Hurle | 1,261 | 3.02 | +0.79 | 2,476 | 5.70 | +0.30 |
| NewZeal | Tony Pitiroi | 899 | 2.15 | +0.74 | 500 | 1.15 | +0.09 |
| Vision New Zealand | Heker Robertson | 409 | 0.98 | — | | | |
| NZ First | | | | | 2,441 | 5.62 | +2.64 |
| Opportunities | | | | | 1,147 | 2.64 | +0.75 |
| Te Pāti Māori | | | | | 511 | 1.17 | +0.78 |
| NZ Loyal | | | | | 261 | 0.60 | — |
| Legalise Cannabis | | | | | 177 | 0.40 | +.010 |
| Freedoms NZ | | | | | 147 | 0.33 | — |
| Animal Justice | | | | | 96 | 0.22 | — |
| New Conservative | | | | | 71 | 0.16 | −1.73 |
| DemocracyNZ | | | | | 55 | 0.12 | — |
| Women's Rights | | | | | 35 | 0.08 | — |
| Leighton Baker Party | | | | | 13 | 0.02 | — |
| New Nation | | | | | 12 | 0.02 | — |
| Informal votes | | 504 | | | 410 | | |
| Total valid votes | | 41,696 | | | 42,146 | | |
| Labour hold | Majority | 8,859 | 21.24 | | | | |

=== 2020 election ===
2020 general election: Remutaka
| Notes: | Blue background denotes the winner of the electorate vote. Pink background denotes a candidate elected from their party list. Yellow background denotes an electorate win by a list member, or other incumbent. A ✓ or ✗ denotes status of any incumbent, win or lose respectively. | | | | | | |
| Party | Candidate | Votes | % | ±% | Party votes | % | ±% |
|---|---|---|---|---|---|---|---|
| Labour | ✓ Chris Hipkins | 29,217 | 68.57 | +13.08 | 25,347 | 58.37 | +15.07 |
| National | Mark Crofskey | 8,720 | 20.46 | −13.04 | 8,274 | 19.05 | −19.84 |
| Green | Chris Norton | 1,610 | 3.78 | −0.86 | 3,105 | 7.15 | +1.72 |
| ACT | Grae O'Sullivan | 952 | 2.23 | +1.75 | 2,607 | 6.00 | +5.63 |
| NZ First | Talani Meikle | 635 | 1.49 | −2.61 | 1,296 | 2.98 | −4.42 |
| New Conservative | Hank Optland | 618 | 1.45 | +0.54 | 822 | 1.89 | +1.47 |
| ONE | Frank Eijgenraam | 602 | 1.41 | — | 462 | 1.06 | — |
| Advance NZ | Michael Alexander Stace | 257 | 0.60 | — | 245 | 0.56 | — |
| Opportunities | | | | | 822 | 1.89 | −0.87 |
| Māori Party | | | | | 171 | 0.39 | −0.06 |
| Legalise Cannabis | | | | | 132 | 0.30 | +0.06 |
| Vision NZ | | | | | 70 | 0.16 | — |
| Outdoors | | | | | 27 | 0.06 | +0.02 |
| Sustainable NZ | | | | | 24 | 0.06 | — |
| Social Credit | | | | | 16 | 0.04 | −0.00 |
| TEA | | | | | 6 | 0.01 | — |
| Heartland | | | | | 2 | 0.00 | — |
| Informal votes | | 726 | | | 283 | | |
| Total valid votes | | 42,611 | | | 43,428 | | |
| Labour hold | Majority | 20,497 | 48.10 | +26.11 | | | |

=== 2017 election ===
2017 general election: Rimutaka
| Notes: | Blue background denotes the winner of the electorate vote. Pink background denotes a candidate elected from their party list. Yellow background denotes an electorate win by a list member, or other incumbent. A ✓ or ✗ denotes status of any incumbent, win or lose respectively. | | | | | | |
| Party | Candidate | Votes | % | ±% | Party votes | % | ±% |
|---|---|---|---|---|---|---|---|
| Labour | ✓ Chris Hipkins | 21,725 | 55.48 | +2.97 | 17,180 | 43.3 | +10.57 |
| National | Carolyn O'Fallon | 13,116 | 33.49 | −0.87 | 15,433 | 38.9 | −2.38 |
| Green | Stefan Grand-Meyer | 1,815 | 4.63 | −0.07 | 2,156 | 5.43 | −4.47 |
| NZ First | Talani Meikle | 1,604 | 4.09 | −0.77 | 2,938 | 7.40 | −2.83 |
| Conservative | Philip Lynch | 356 | 0.91 | −1.74 | 169 | 0.43 | −3.58 |
| ACT | Grae O'Sullivan | 190 | 0.49 | — | 147 | 0.37 | +0.03 |
| Opportunities | | | | | 1,095 | 2.76 | — |
| Māori Party | | | | | 181 | 0.46 | +0.6 |
| Legalise Cannabis | | | | | 96 | 0.24 | −0.28 |
| Ban 1080 | | | | | 33 | 0.08 | −0.15 |
| United Future | | | | | 32 | 0.08 | −0.25 |
| People's Party | | | | | 22 | 0.06 | — |
| Outdoors | | | | | 16 | 0.04 | — |
| Internet | | | | | 12 | 0.03 | −0.84 (Note: 2017 Internet Party swing is relative to the votes for Internet-Mana in 2014; it shared a party list with Mana Party in the 2014 election) |
| Democrats | | | | | 10 | 0.03 | −0.01 |
| Mana | | | | | 10 | 0.03 | −0.84 (Note: 2017 Mana Party swing is relative to the votes for Internet-Mana in 2014; it shared a party list with the Internet Party in the 2014 election) |
| Informal votes | | 347 | | | 148 | | |
| Total valid votes | | 39,153 | | | 39,678 | | |
| Labour hold | Majority | 8,609 | 21.99 | +3.85 | | | |

=== 2014 election ===
2014 general election: Rimutaka
| Notes: | Blue background denotes the winner of the electorate vote. Pink background denotes a candidate elected from their party list. Yellow background denotes an electorate win by a list member, or other incumbent. A ✓ or ✗ denotes status of any incumbent, win or lose respectively. | | | | | | |
| Party | Candidate | Votes | % | ±% | Party votes | % | ±% |
|---|---|---|---|---|---|---|---|
| Labour | ✓ Chris Hipkins | 19,286 | 52.51 | +2.25 | 12,176 | 32.73 | −0.16 |
| National | Lewis Holden | 12,622 | 34.36 | −6.27 | 15,352 | 41.28 | −3.16 |
| NZ First | Aaron Hunt | 1,785 | 4.86 | +4.86 | 3,806 | 10.23 | +6.21 |
| Green | Susanne Ruthven | 1,727 | 4.70 | −1.12 | 3,422 | 9.90 | −1.41 |
| Conservative | Philip Michael Lynch | 973 | 2.65 | +2.65 | 955 | 4.01 | +1.25 |
| Internet Mana | | | | | 324 | 0.87 | +0.64 (Note: 2014 Internet Mana swing is relative to the votes for Mana in 2011; it shared a party list with Internet in the 2014 election.) |
| Legalise Cannabis | | | | | 194 | 0.52 | +0.05 |
| Māori Party | | | | | 149 | 0.40 | −0.15 |
| ACT | | | | | 126 | 0.34 | −0.34 |
| United Future | | | | | 122 | 0.33 | −0.66 |
| Ban 1080 | | | | | 84 | 0.23 | +0.23 |
| Civilian | | | | | 19 | 0.05 | +0.05 |
| Independent Coalition | | | | | 19 | 0.05 | +0.05 |
| Democrats | | | | | 14 | 0.04 | +0.00 |
| Focus | | | | | 4 | 0.01 | +0.01 |
| Informal votes | | 241 | | | 159 | | |
| Total valid votes | | 36,393 | | | 37,194 | | |
| Labour hold | Majority | 6,664 | 18.14 | +8.52 | | | |

Electorate (as at 20 September 2014): 46,526

=== 2011 election ===
2011 general election: Rimutaka
| Notes: | Blue background denotes the winner of the electorate vote. Pink background denotes a candidate elected from their party list. Yellow background denotes an electorate win by a list member, or other incumbent. A ✓ or ✗ denotes status of any incumbent, win or lose respectively. | | | | | | |
| Party | Candidate | Votes | % | ±% | Party votes | % | ±% |
|---|---|---|---|---|---|---|---|
| Labour | ✓ Chris Hipkins | 17,171 | 51.58 | 12.31 | 11,375 | 33.13 | −8.18 |
| National | Jonathan Fletcher | 13,885 | 41.71 | +4.60 | 15,364 | 44.75 | +4.10 |
| Green | Tane Woodley | 1,990 | 5.98 | +0.96 | 3,422 | 9.97 | +4.04 |
| ACT | Alwyn Courtenay | 241 | 0.72 | −0.57 | 235 | 0.68 | −1.87 |
| NZ First | | | | | 2,148 | 6.26 | +2.17 |
| Conservative | | | | | 955 | 2.78 | +2.78 |
| United Future | | | | | 340 | 0.99 | −0.41 |
| Māori Party | | | | | 190 | 0.55 | −0.18 |
| Legalise Cannabis | | | | | 164 | 0.48 | +0.13 |
| Mana | | | | | 80 | 0.23 | +0.23 |
| Libertarianz | | | | | 28 | 0.08 | +0.04 |
| Alliance | | | | | 20 | 0.06 | −0.02 |
| Democrats | | | | | 12 | 0.03 | +0.01 |
| Informal votes | | 879 | | | 240 | | |
| Total valid votes | | 33,287 | | | 34,333 | | |
| Labour hold | Majority | 3,286 | 9.87 | +7.72 | | | |

Electorate (as at 26 November 2011): 44,403

=== 2008 election ===
2008 general election: Rimutaka
| Notes: | Blue background denotes the winner of the electorate vote. Pink background denotes a candidate elected from their party list. Yellow background denotes an electorate win by a list member, or other incumbent. A ✓ or ✗ denotes status of any incumbent, win or lose respectively. | | | | | | |
| Party | Candidate | Votes | % | ±% | Party votes | % | ±% |
|---|---|---|---|---|---|---|---|
| Labour | Chris Hipkins | 13,735 | 39.27 | −15.47 | 14,685 | 41.31 | −6.49 |
| National | Richard Whiteside | 12,982 | 37.12 | +6.63 | 14,452 | 40.65 | +6.61 |
| NZ First | Ron Mark | 5,257 | 15.03 | +11.82 | 1,453 | 4.09 | −0.52 |
| Green | Lynette Vigrass | 1,755 | 5.02 | +1.38 | 2,107 | 5.93 | +1.76 |
| United Future | Jenni Hurn | 522 | 1.49 | −3.72 | 499 | 1.40 | −3.26 |
| ACT | Nigel Kearney | 453 | 1.30 | +0.19 | 909 | 2.56 | +1.36 |
| Progressive | John Maurice | 272 | 0.78 | +0.78 | 345 | 0.97 | −0.33 |
| Māori Party | | | | | 260 | 0.73 | +0.21 |
| Bill and Ben | | | | | 255 | 0.72 | +0.72 |
| Kiwi | | | | | 242 | 0.68 | +0.68 |
| Legalise Cannabis | | | | | 122 | 0.34 | −1.65 |
| Family Party | | | | | 85 | 0.24 | +0.24 |
| Pacific | | | | | 57 | 0.16 | +0.16 |
| Alliance | | | | | 28 | 0.08 | - |
| Workers Party | | | | | 18 | 0.05 | +0.05 |
| Libertarianz | | | | | 13 | 0.04 | −0.01 |
| Democrats | | | | | 8 | 0.02 | +0.02 |
| RONZ | | | | | 7 | 0.02 | +0.01 |
| RAM | | | | | 4 | 0.01 | +0.01 |
| Informal votes | | 297 | | | 126 | | |
| Total valid votes | | 34,976 | | | 35,549 | | |
| Labour hold | Majority | 753 | 2.15 | | | | |

=== 2005 election ===
2005 general election: Rimutaka
| Notes: | Blue background denotes the winner of the electorate vote. Pink background denotes a candidate elected from their party list. Yellow background denotes an electorate win by a list member, or other incumbent. A ✓ or ✗ denotes status of any incumbent, win or lose respectively. | | | | | | |
| Party | Candidate | Votes | % | ±% | Party votes | % | ±% |
|---|---|---|---|---|---|---|---|
| Labour | ✓ Paul Swain | 18,681 | 54.74 | −4.67 | 16,558 | 47.80 | |
| National | Mike Leddy | 10,404 | 30.49 | +11.18 | 11,791 | 34.04 | |
| United Future | Bernard McLelland | 1,777 | 5.21 | | 1,615 | 4.66 | |
| Green | Michael Morris | 1,243 | 3.64 | | 1,446 | 4.17 | |
| NZ First | David Fowler | 1,094 | 3.21 | | 1,736 | 5.01 | |
| Independent | Dave Reynolds | 549 | 1.61 | | | | |
| ACT | John Waugh | 380 | 1.11 | | 414 | 1.20 | |
| Legalise Cannabis | | | | | 691 | 1.99 | |
| Progressive | | | | | 451 | 1.30 | |
| Destiny | | | | | 197 | 0.57 | |
| Māori Party | | | | | 181 | 0.52 | |
| Christian Heritage | | | | | 54 | 0.16 | |
| Alliance | | | | | 28 | 0.08 | |
| Libertarianz | | | | | 19 | 0.05 | |
| 99 MP | | | | | 14 | 0.04 | |
| Democrats | | | | | 10 | 0.03 | |
| Family Rights | | | | | 9 | 0.03 | |
| One NZ | | | | | 8 | 0.02 | |
| Direct Democracy | | | | | 6 | 0.02 | |
| RONZ | | | | | 2 | 0.01 | |
| Informal votes | | 353 | | | 145 | | |
| Total valid votes | | 34,128 | | | 34,640 | | |
| Labour hold | Majority | 8,277 | 24.25 | −16.10 | | | |

=== 2002 election ===
2002 general election: Rimutaka
| Notes: | Blue background denotes the winner of the electorate vote. Pink background denotes a candidate elected from their party list. Yellow background denotes an electorate win by a list member, or other incumbent. A ✓ or ✗ denotes status of any incumbent, win or lose respectively. | | | | | | |
| Party | Candidate | Votes | % | ±% | Party votes | % | ±% |
|---|---|---|---|---|---|---|---|
| Labour | ✓ Paul Swain | 18,688 | 58.65 | | 14,856 | 46.31 | |
| National | Mike Leddy | 6,073 | 19.06 | | 5,387 | 16.79 | |
| United Future | Wayne Chapman | 1,957 | 6.14 | | 2,933 | 9.14 | |
| Green | Russel Norman | 1,267 | 3.97 | | 1,683 | 5.24 | |
| ACT | Nick Kearney | 1,168 | 3.66 | | 2,004 | 6.24 | |
| Christian Heritage | Ken Munn | 1,014 | 3.18 | | 526 | 1.63 | |
| Progressive | Robert Bryan | 412 | 1.29 | | 669 | 2.08 | |
| Independent | Nick Kelly | 376 | 1.18 | | | | |
| Alliance | Moira Lawler | 310 | 0.97 | | 394 | 1.22 | |
| One NZ | Peter Grove | 192 | 0.60 | | 82 | 0.25 | |
| NZ First | | | | | 2,641 | 8.23 | |
| ORNZ | | | | | 562 | 1.75 | |
| Legalise Cannabis | | | | | 179 | 0.55 | |
| NMP | | | | | 10 | 0.03 | |
| Mana Māori | | | | | 7 | 0.02 | |
| Informal votes | | 404 | | | 146 | | |
| Total valid votes | | 31,861 | | | 32,079 | | |
| Labour hold | Majority | 12,615 | 39.59 | | | | |

=== 1999 election ===
1999 general election: Rimutaka
| Notes: | Blue background denotes the winner of the electorate vote. Pink background denotes a candidate elected from their party list. Yellow background denotes an electorate win by a list member, or other incumbent. A ✓ or ✗ denotes status of any incumbent, win or lose respectively. | | | | | | |
| Party | Candidate | Votes | % | ±% | Party votes | % | ±% |
|---|---|---|---|---|---|---|---|
| Labour | ✓ Paul Swain | 16,806 | 52.92 | | 13,675 | 43.47 | |
| National | Stuart Blair Roddick | 8,432 | 26.55 | | 8,993 | 28.59 | |
| Alliance | Brendan Tracey | 1,733 | 5.45 | | 2,732 | 8.68 | |
| Christian Democrats | Geoff Hounsell | 947 | 2.98 | | 641 | 2.03 | |
| Green | Don Murray | 858 | 2.70 | | 1,259 | 4.00 | |
| Legalise Cannabis | Brian Jensen | 687 | 2.16 | | 449 | 1.42 | |
| ACT | Owen Dance | 663 | 2.08 | | 1,679 | 5.33 | |
| Christian Heritage | Helma Vermeulen | 536 | 1.68 | | 678 | 2.15 | |
| NZ First | John Hoani Cribb | 535 | 1.68 | | 911 | 2.89 | |
| Asia Pacific | Naransamy Manoharan | 34 | 0.10 | | | | |
| United NZ | | | | | 191 | 0.60 | |
| Libertarianz | | | | | 77 | 0.24 | |
| Animals First | | | | | 67 | 0.21 | |
| McGillicuddy Serious | | | | | 50 | 0.15 | |
| Mauri Pacific | | | | | 11 | 0.03 | |
| Mana Māori | | | | | 7 | 0.02 | |
| The People's Choice | | | | | 7 | 0.02 | |
| Natural Law | | | | | 6 | 0.02 | |
| One NZ | | | | | 6 | | |
| South Island | | | | | 6 | 0.02 | |
| NMP | | | | | 4 | 0.01 | |
| Freedom Movement | | | | | 2 | 0.01 | |
| Republican | | | | | 2 | 0.01 | |
| Informal votes | | 525 | | | 303 | | |
| Total valid votes | | 31,756 | | | 31,453 | | |
| Labour hold | Majority | 8,374 | 26.36 | | | | |

=== 1996 election ===
1996 general election: Rimutaka
| Notes: | Blue background denotes the winner of the electorate vote. Pink background denotes a candidate elected from their party list. Yellow background denotes an electorate win by a list member, or other incumbent. A ✓ or ✗ denotes status of any incumbent, win or lose respectively. | | | | | | |
| Party | Candidate | Votes | % | ±% | Party votes | % | ±% |
|---|---|---|---|---|---|---|---|
| Labour | ✓ Paul Swain | 11,665 | 36.98 | | 10,560 | 33.47 | |
| National | Karyn Bisdee | 8,787 | 27.85 | | 10,270 | 32.55 | |
| NZ First | ✗ Peter McCardle | 6,776 | 21.48 | | 3,131 | 9.92 | |
| Alliance | Brendan Tracey | 2,379 | 7.54 | | 3,678 | 11.66 | |
| Christian Coalition | Geoff Hounsell | 1,043 | 3.30 | | 1,693 | 5.36 | |
| ACT | Owen Dance | 367 | 1.16 | | 1,697 | 5.37 | |
| McGillicuddy Serious | Dan Hegarty | 251 | 0.79 | | 115 | 0.36 | |
| Natural Law | Neil West | 52 | 0.16 | | 22 | 0.06 | |
| Legalise Cannabis | | | | | 447 | 1.41 | |
| United NZ | | | | | 229 | 0.72 | |
| Animals First | | | | | 65 | 0.20 | |
| Progressive Green | | | | | 56 | 0.17 | |
| Asia Pacific | | | | | 19 | 0.06 | |
| Superannuitants & Youth | | | | | 18 | 0.05 | |
| Ethnic Minority | | | | | 12 | 0.03 | |
| Green Society | | | | | 10 | 0.03 | |
| Mana Māori | | | | | 9 | 0.02 | |
| Libertarianz | | | | | 8 | 0.02 | |
| Conservatives | | | | | 7 | 0.02 | |
| Advance NZ | | | | | 2 | 0.01 | |
| Te Tawharau | | | | | 2 | 0.01 | |
| Informal votes | | 223 | | | 93 | | |
| Total valid votes | | 31,543 | | | 31,543 | | |
| Labour hold | Majority | 2,878 | 9.12 | | | | |
