= Ohariu-Belmont (electorate) =

Ohariu-Belmont was a New Zealand parliamentary electorate from 1996 to 2008.

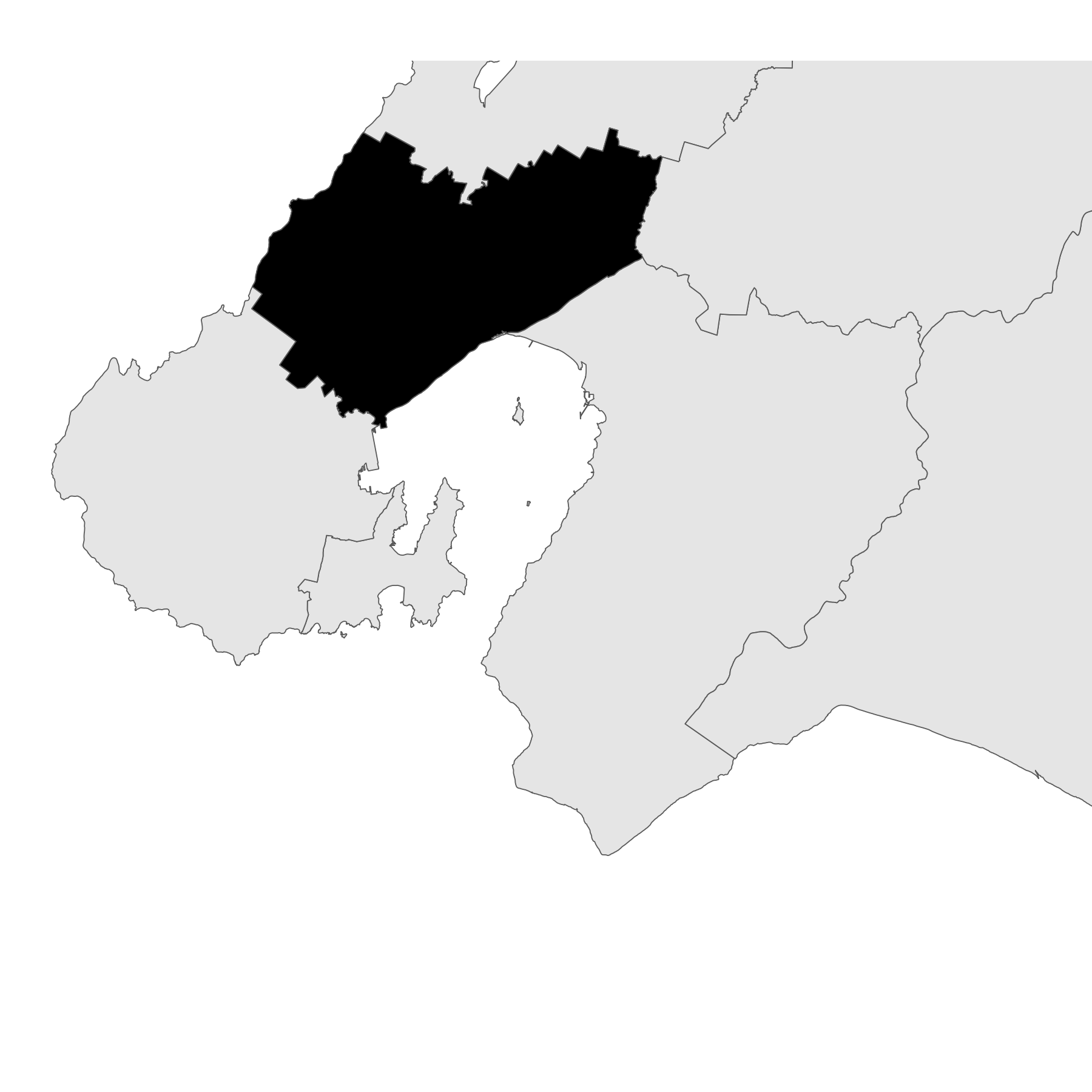
Map of the Ohariu-Belmont electorate

== Population centres ==
The 1996 election was notable for the significant change of electorate boundaries, based on the provisions of the Electoral Act 1993. Because of the introduction of the mixed-member proportional (MMP) electoral system, the number of electorates had to be reduced, leading to significant changes. More than half of the electorates contested in 1996 were newly constituted, and most of the remainder had seen significant boundary changes. In total, 73 electorates were abolished, 29 electorates were newly created (including Ohariu-Belmont), and 10 electorates were recreated, giving a net loss of 34 electorates.

The electorate covered the northern suburbs of the city of Wellington, i.e. Ngaio, Tawa, Khandallah and Johnsonville, and also the adjacent suburb of Belmont in the Western Hutt Valley.

== History ==
The electorate was established in the first MMP election of 1996. It replaced Onslow, but also included Belmont so was renamed Ohariu-Belmont.

In the 1993 election the Onslow electorate had replaced the earlier Ohariu electorate which had existed since the 1978 election, and when in the 2008 election the Belmont area was shifted to the Hutt Valley electorate of Rimutaka, the electorate was renamed back to Ōhariu (with a macron).

=== Members of Parliament ===
Key

| United NZ | United Future |
| Alliance | ACT |

| Election | Winner |
|---|---|
| 1996 election | Peter Dunne^{1} |
| 1999 election | Peter Dunne^{1} |
| 2002 election | Peter Dunne^{1} |
| 2005 election | Peter Dunne^{1} |
(Electorate abolished in 2008; see Ōhāriu)

^{1}United New Zealand joined with Future New Zealand to become United Future New Zealand, in 2002.

=== List MPs ===
Members of Parliament elected from party lists in elections where that person also unsuccessfully contested the Ohariu-Belmont electorate. Unless otherwise stated, all MPs terms began and ended at general elections.

| Election | Winner |
|---|---|
| 1996 election | Phillida Bunkle |
| 1996 election | Ken Shirley |
| 2002 election | Heather Roy |
| 2005 election | Heather Roy |
| 2006 | Charles Chauvel^{1} |
| 2007 | Katrina Shanks^{2} |

^{1}Chauvel entered Parliament on 1 August 2006, following the resignation of Jim Sutton.
^{2}Shanks entered Parliament on 7 February 2007, following the resignation of Don Brash.

== Election results ==
=== 2005 election ===
2005 general election: Ohariu-Belmont
| Notes: | Blue background denotes the winner of the electorate vote. Pink background denotes a candidate elected from their party list. Yellow background denotes an electorate win by a list member, or other incumbent. A ✓ or ✗ denotes status of any incumbent, win or lose respectively. | | | | | | |
| Party | Candidate | Votes | % | ±% | Party votes | % | ±% |
|---|---|---|---|---|---|---|---|
| United Future | ✓ Peter Dunne | 16,844 | 45.60 | -12.25 | 2,063 | 5.54 | -7.47 |
| Labour | Charles Chauvel | 9,142 | 24.91 | +4.49 | 14,720 | 39.57 | +2.93 |
| National | Katrina Shanks | 7,329 | 19.70 | +6.41 | 16,042 | 43.13 | +18.75 |
| Green | Roland Sapsford | 1,877 | 5.12 | +2.10 | 2,174 | 5.84 | -0.62 |
| ACT | Heather Roy | 744 | 2.03 | -0.43 | 554 | 1.49 | -8.66 |
| NZ First | Timothy Manu | 433 | 1.18 | | 1,024 | 2.75 | -2.15 |
| Progressive | Elspeth Sandys | 242 | 0.66 | +0.03 | 239 | 0.64 | -0.53 |
| Libertarianz | Colin Linden Cross | 82 | 0.22 | | 21 | 0.05 | |
| Destiny | | | | | 127 | 0.34 | |
| Māori Party | | | | | 104 | 0.28 | |
| Legalise Cannabis | | | | | 58 | 0.16 | -0.21 |
| Christian Heritage | | | | | 17 | 0.05 | -0.81 |
| 99 MP | | | | | 16 | 0.04 | |
| Alliance | | | | | 16 | 0.04 | -1.20 |
| Family Rights | | | | | 8 | 0.02 | |
| One NZ | | | | | 5 | 0.01 | -0.05 |
| Democrats | | | | | 4 | 0.01 | |
| RONZ | | | | | 3 | 0.01 | |
| Direct Democracy | | | | | 2 | 0.01 | |
| Informal votes | | 247 | | | 73 | | |
| Total valid votes | | 36,693 | | | 37,197 | | |
| United Future hold | Majority | 7,702 | 20.99 | -16.54 | | | |

=== 2002 election ===
2002 general election: Ohariu-Belmont
| Notes: | Blue background denotes the winner of the electorate vote. Pink background denotes a candidate elected from their party list. Yellow background denotes an electorate win by a list member, or other incumbent. A ✓ or ✗ denotes status of any incumbent, win or lose respectively. | | | | | | |
| Party | Candidate | Votes | % | ±% | Party votes | % | ±% |
|---|---|---|---|---|---|---|---|
| United Future | ✓ Peter Dunne | 19,355 | 57.95 | +0.45 | 4,394 | 13.01 | (Note: The United Future swing is compared to the total of the United NZ and Future NZ party votes in 1999)+8.49 |
| Labour | Gill Body-Greer | 6,821 | 20.42 | +1.37 | 12,374 | 36.64 | +5.42 |
| National | Dale Stephens | 4,440 | 13.29 | | 8,232 | 24.38 | -15.18 |
| Green | Gareth Bodle | 1,008 | 3.02 | -1.05 | 2,183 | 6.46 | +1.84 |
| ACT | Heather Roy | 823 | 2.46 | -4.24 | 3,428 | 10.15 | +1.29 |
| Legalise Cannabis | Dave Moore | 276 | 0.83 | | 126 | 0.37 | +0.29 |
| Christian Heritage | Chris Salt | 242 | 0.72 | -1.17 | 292 | 0.86 | -1.10 |
| Alliance | Rebecca Matthews | 222 | 0.66 | -3.25 | 418 | 1.24 | -4.06 |
| Progressive | C Kerr | 210 | 0.63 | | 394 | 1.17 | |
| NZ First | | | | | 1,654 | 4.90 | 2.93 |
| ORNZ | | | | | 246 | 0.73 | |
| One NZ | | | | | 21 | 0.06 | +0.02 |
| Mana Māori | | | | | 8 | 0.02 | ±0.00 |
| NMP | | | | | 1 | 0.00 | -0.38 |
| Informal votes | | 211 | | | 83 | | |
| Total valid votes | | 33,397 | | | 33,771 | | |
| United Future hold | Majority | 12,534 | 37.53 | | | | |

=== 1999 election ===
1999 general election: Ohariu-Belmont
| Notes: | Blue background denotes the winner of the electorate vote. Pink background denotes a candidate elected from their party list. Yellow background denotes an electorate win by a list member, or other incumbent. A ✓ or ✗ denotes status of any incumbent, win or lose respectively. | | | | | | |
| Party | Candidate | Votes | % | ±% | Party votes | % | ±% |
|---|---|---|---|---|---|---|---|
| United NZ | ✓ Peter Dunne | 20,240 | 57.40 | +8.41 | 1,004 | 2.81 | +0.24 |
| Labour | Derek Best | 7,683 | 21.79 | -1.00 | 11,154 | 31.22 | +5.13 |
| ACT | Kathryn Asare | 2,361 | 6.70 | +0.76 | 3,167 | 8.86 | +2.51 |
| Green | Caron Zillwood | 1,436 | 4.07 | | 1,649 | 4.62 | |
| Alliance | Rebecca Matthews | 1,342 | 3.81 | -8.40 | 1,894 | 5.30 | -3.00 |
| Christian Heritage | Chris Salt | 666 | 1.89 | | 701 | 1.96 | |
| Future NZ | Wayne Chapman | 475 | 1.35 | | 610 | 1.71 | |
| NZ First | Bruce Farland | 453 | 1.28 | -3.18 | 703 | 1.97 | -3.91 |
| McGillicuddy Serious | Philip John Grimmett | 284 | 0.81 | | 71 | 0.20 | -0.14 |
| NMP | Mark Atkin | 140 | 0.40 | | 135 | 0.38 | |
| Asia Pacific | Sriram Gopalakrishnan | 102 | 0.29 | | | | |
| Natural Law | Bruce Sowry | 82 | 0.23 | | 18 | 0.05 | -0.15 |
| National | | | | | 14,133 | 39.56 | |
| Legalise Cannabis | | | | | 289 | 0.08 | -1.09 |
| Libertarianz | | | | | 84 | 0.26 | +0.24 |
| Animals First | | | | | 57 | 0.16 | -0.04 |
| Mauri Pacific | | | | | 18 | 0.05 | |
| One NZ | | | | | 13 | 0.04 | |
| Freedom Movement | | | | | 9 | 0.03 | |
| Mana Māori | | | | | 6 | 0.02 | +0.01 |
| South Island | | | | | 5 | 0.01 | |
| People's Choice | | | | | 5 | 0.01 | |
| Republican | | | | | 2 | 0.01 | |
| Informal votes | | | | | 169 | | |
| Total valid votes | | 35,182 | | | 35,727 | | |
| United NZ hold | Majority | 12,557 | 35.69 | | | | |
