= Tuariki Delamere =

New Zealand politician

The Honourable Tuariki Delamere

48th Minister of Immigration
- In office 31 August 1998 – 24 November 1999
- Prime Minister: Jim Bolger; Jenny Shipley
- Preceded by: Roger Maxwell
- Succeeded by: Wyatt Creech (Acting); Lianne Dalziel

Member of the New Zealand Parliament for Te Tai Rāwhiti
- In office 1996–1999
- Preceded by: Constituency established
- Succeeded by: Constituency abolished

Personal details
- Born: 9 December 1951 (age 74) Papakura, New Zealand
- Party: The Opportunities Party (2020)
- Other political affiliations: National (2000–?); Te Tawharau (1999–2000); New Zealand First (1996–1998)
- Relatives: Anne Delamere (aunt)
- Education: Tauranga Boys' College
- Alma mater: Washington State University; Long Island University

Tuariki John Edward Delamere (born 9 December 1951) is a former New Zealand politician and Cabinet Minister. As a college athlete in the USA, he was known for pioneering the full somersault in the long jump event.

Delamere was elected to the New Zealand House of Representatives in the 1996 New Zealand general election, reprresenting the Te Tai Rawhiti electorate in the New Zealand First party. When the government coalition collapsed, he served out his term in the newly-founded Te Tawharau party. He later stood for parliament on The Opportunity Party ticket.

Delamere served in the Fourth National Government, including as Minister of Customs, Minister for Pacific Island Affairs, and Minister of Immigration.

After politics, he established an immigration consultancy and served as political advisor to the Māori King.

== Early life ==
John Edward Delamere was born in 1951 at a military hospital in Papakura, and was educated in Tauranga, attending Tauranga Boys' College. Of Māori descent through his soldier father, his iwi affiliations include Whakatohea, Te Arawa and Te Whanau-a-Apanui. Delamere adopted the name Tuariki, his father's name, in 1997 after he was appointed as a Cabinet minister. Tuariki means "chief of high standing".

In 1967 and 1969, he was recognised as the top Māori student in New Zealand. He then attended Washington State University on an athletic scholarship. Delamere obtained a Bachelor of Arts in 1974. He later obtained a Master of Business Administration from Long Island University.

Delamere served in the United States Army from 1974 to 1978. He was an accountant stationed at Fort Leonard Wood, Missouri, and later joined the staff at the United States Military Academy at West Point, New York. After leaving the United States, Delamere worked as chief financial officer for Polynesian Airlines. In the early 1990s, he held a number of bureaucratic roles in New Zealand, including for the Department of Justice and Te Puni Kōkiri.

Delamere also had a sporting career. He competed and set records in long jump and triple jump, representing New Zealand in those events in the 1974 Commonwealth Games at Christchurch. At Washington State, he pioneered the technique of a full somersault in long jump competitions, which was later banned.

Delamere is married to Jo-Ell; they share three children and eight grandchildren.

== Member of Parliament ==
=== New Zealand First ===
Delamere unsuccessfully sought the National Party nomination in the West Auckland electorate in 1990. He joined New Zealand First in 1993 but did not contest that year's general election.

New Zealand Parliament
Years	Term	Electorate	List	Party
1996–1998	45th	Te Tai Rawhiti	18	NZ First
1998–1999	Changed allegiance to:			Independent
1999	Changed allegiance to:			Te Tawharau

Delamere entered politics in the 1996 elections, when he successfully stood as a candidate for the New Zealand First party in the Te Tai Rawhiti electorate, defeating Sir Peter Tapsell and becoming one of the group known as the Tight Five. Immediately after being elected, he was appointed to Cabinet as part of New Zealand First's coalition deal with the National Party. Initially, Delamere was given ministerial responsibility for the Valuation Department and the Public Trust Office; he was also associate Treasurer. He became Minister of Customs and Associate Minister of Health when Neil Kirton was fired in September 1997.

Delamere oversaw the restructuring of the Valuation Department into a Crown-owned company, Quotable Value New Zealand Limited, and the transfer of employees to that company and, in the case of the Valuer-General, to Land Information New Zealand. The restructure was intended to create "improved efficiencies" and cost-savings. As Associate Minister of Health, Delamere held responsibility for Māori health, health regulation and protection, environmental health (including the Smokefree Environments Act) and Pharmac. An anti-smoking campaigner, Delamere declared himself "out to destroy" cigarette companies. He announced a new requirement for health warnings on cigarette packets to be in larger text in August 1998. He sought to ban smoking from all restaurants, schools, and public buildings and to ban displays of cigarettes in stores. These policies would eventually be advanced by the subsequent Labour and National governments.

=== Independent ===
The National–New Zealand First coalition began to break apart in 1998. Following the sudden replacement of Te Tai Tokerau MP Tau Henare as New Zealand First deputy leader with Peter Brown, newspaper reports suggested New Zealand First's Tight Five MPs would break away to form a new Māori-led political party. Delamere initially denied involvement, but a leaked report written by Delamere outlined the strategy to launch such a party. Several New Zealand First ministers, including leader Winston Peters, walked out of a Cabinet meeting after disagreeing with the Government's policy to sell shares in Wellington Airport. Peters was ultimately sacked from the Cabinet by the prime minister, Jenny Shipley. Despite reports that Delamere was intending a leadership challenge against Peters, Delamere resigned from New Zealand First on 18 August, opting to stay as an independent MP supporting the government. Describing his split from Peters, he said, "I have been lucky and privileged to be here and that's all thanks to Winston, I acknowledge that, but at the end of the day, he doesn't own my soul."

In Shipley's 31 August 1998 ministerial reshuffle, Delamere was removed from the Cabinet but continued as an associate minister in the finance and health portfolios; he was additionally appointed Minister of Immigration and Minister for Pacific Island Affairs. This, combined with his former role as customs minister, led political commentator Morgan Godfery in 2019 to describe Delamere as "the first Māori to control the borders since... 1840." On 22 December 1998, Delamere announced gay and lesbian couples applying for permanent residency would have the same rights as straight de facto couples: a change the former immigration minister Max Bradford stated was too difficult.

Delamere was fired from the immigration portfolio in late 1999 after a scandal regarding the application of immigration rules. Specifically, it emerged that Delamere had approved permanent residency for a group of Chinese businessmen provided they invested generously in various Māori development schemes. Delamere was widely criticised for using his authority to ensure that money was given to certain groups. Delamere himself claimed that his actions were a perfectly reasonable method of addressing Māori development needs. Although he lost the immigration portfolio, he retained his other roles.

Through 1998 and 1999, Delamere publicly considered introducing legislation to support the establishment of Māori constituencies for Bay of Plenty Regional Council. This was reported to be a source of tension between him and Peters before the coalition government collapsed. The legislation was later introduced by Labour MP Mita Ririnui and passed in 2001.

=== Te Tawharau ===
Shortly before the 1999 election, Delamere joined the small Māori Te Tawharau party, giving it its first representation in Parliament. He had previously declined to join the Mauri Pacific party, established by five other former New Zealand First MPs, including three of the Tight Five. Shortly prior to the election, Delamere announced that Te Tawharau would support only a Labour Party government on confidence and supply if it won seats in the new Parliament. This was at odds with Delamere's unwavering support of the legislative programme of the Shipley Administration. In the elections, Delamere contested the new Waiariki electorate — he placed second, with 20.01% of the vote. The winner was Mita Ririnui of the Labour Party. He was also placed second on the party list of the Mana Māori Movement, which Te Tawharau was affiliated with, but the party did not win any seats.

== Later career ==
=== Private sector career ===
After Parliament, Delamere established himself as an immigration consultant, founding the company of Tuariki Delamere & Associates.

In 2006, a jury found Delamere not guilty of charges brought by the Serious Fraud Office.

In late May 2023, Delamere represented a Chinese overstayer known as "Chen" (or "Feng"). Chen alleged that he had been mishandled by Immigration New Zealand compliance officers during a dawn raid in 2022, resulting in a broken left wrist. Immigration NZ disputed Chen's account, claiming that he sustained his injuries while attempting to flee compliance officers and resisted arrest. Delamere complained about Chen's treatment to the Police, Independent Police Conduct Authority and MBIE. In addition to overstaying his visa, Chen was also charged with being linked to an organised fraud group that was involved in organising travel plans and visa applications. Chen disputed the charges and has applied for refugee status with the Immigration Protection Tribunal, claiming that he risked arrest if deported to China. In response to Chen's case, Delamere described Chen's case as a "crock of lies" on the part of the immigration department. He also criticised Immigration New Zealand for continuing with dawn raids despite the New Zealand Government's apology for dawn raids targeting Pasifika overstayers during the 1970s.

== Political career ==
In 2000 Delamere rejoined the New Zealand National Party, the party he had started his political career with. However he ruled out a return to Parliament to concentrate on his business concerns.

Delamre was appointed political advisor to the Māori King, Tuheita in 2018.

In July 2020, more than twenty years after Delamere last stood for office, he joined The Opportunities Party (TOP) and served as its immigration spokesperson and candidate for Auckland Central in the 2020 election. The party was unsuccessful, with TOP's vote share of 1.6% being too low to enter Parliament.

=== Revocation of immigration licence ===
Delamere's licence to act as an immigration consultant was revoked after the failure of a firm he founded with a Chinese businessman who was seeking a New Zealand business visa. When courts ruled that the firm did not comply with his visa investment conditions, the co-founder successfully sought bankruptcy proceedings against Delamere.

New Zealand Parliament
New constituency	Member of Parliament for Te Tai Rawhiti; 1996–1999	Constituency abolished Renamed as Ikaroa-Rawhiti
Political offices
Preceded by Neil Kirton	Minister of Customs; 1997–1998	Succeeded by John Luxton
