= Neil Kirton =

New Zealand politician

Neil Francis Kirton (born 16 May 1956) is a New Zealand politician. He was an MP from 1996 to 1999, first as a member of the New Zealand First party and then as an independent. Before the splintering of New Zealand First, he was known as its leading dissident.

== Early life and education ==
Born on 16 May 1956, Kirton was educated at Sacred Heart College, Auckland, and the University of Otago, from where he graduated with a Bachelor of Science degree in 1978 and a Postgraduate Diploma in Science with first-class honours in 1979.

== Member of Parliament ==
New Zealand Parliament
Years	Term	Electorate	List	Party
1996–98	45th	List	12	NZ First
1998–99	Changed allegiance to:			Independent

Kirton was first elected to Parliament in the 1996 election as a New Zealand First list MP, having contested the Hamilton West electorate. When New Zealand First formed a coalition with the governing National Party, Kirton was appointed Associate Minister of Health. Kirton soon became disillusioned with this arrangement, however, disliking the National Party's health policies. He became increasingly critical of his party's coalition with National, and in August 1997, he was fired from his role as Associate Minister of Health after quarreling bitterly with the Minister of Health, Bill English. Kirton accused English of breaching the coalition agreement between National and New Zealand First, and called National "untrustworthy" and "deceitful". He then launched an unsuccessful campaign within New Zealand First to break off the coalition and come to an arrangement with the Labour Party.

On 24 October, it was announced that Kirton would not be seeking renomination for New Zealand First, with Kirton saying that the party had lost its principles. Kirton did not resign from the party, however, deciding to remain a member until the end of the Parliamentary term. He therefore remained a dissident, and frequently criticised the party's leader, Winston Peters. He also continued to attack National's health policies. He attacked his replacement as Associate Minister of Health, New Zealand First's Tuariki Delamere, as a liar, and accused him of tamely accepting whatever the National Party wished.

By the middle of the following year, however, matters had reached the point where Kirton's position in the party was no longer tenable, and on 28 July 1998, Kirton quit the party to become an independent. This deprived the government of its majority, leaving Parliament evenly split between the government and the opposition. As a result, the government was forced to do a deal with the United New Zealand party. Later, when the coalition between New Zealand First and National finally collapsed, the government's majority became even more precarious, but it nevertheless managed to survive until the end of the term.

== Local politics ==
Kirton did not seek re-election in the 1999 election, instead going into local politics. He was elected as the top-polling candidate in the Napier ward for both the 2001, 2004, 2007, and 2010 local body elections on the Hawke's Bay Regional Council. He retired from local politics at the 2013 local body election, as was appointed as chief executive of the New Zealand Cancer Society's Central Division.

Political offices
Preceded by Murray McCully	Minister of Customs; 1996–1997	Succeeded by Tuariki Delamere
