= Rodney (New Zealand electorate) =

- Former Single-member constituency for the New Zealand House of Representatives
- Location of within Auckland
- Region: Auckland

Former constituency
- Created: 1871
- Abolished: 2020
- Last MP: Mark Mitchell
- Party: National

Rodney was a New Zealand parliamentary electorate, returning one Member of Parliament to the House of Representatives. The last MP for Rodney was Mark Mitchell of the National Party. He held this position from 2011 until the electorate was replaced with Whangaparāoa in 2020. Mitchell stood for and won that seat.

== Population centres ==
The 1941 New Zealand census had been postponed due to World War II, so the 1946 electoral redistribution had to take ten years of population growth and movements into account. The North Island gained a further two electorates from the South Island due to faster population growth. The abolition of the country quota through the Electoral Amendment Act, 1945 reduced the number and increased the size of rural electorates. None of the existing electorates remained unchanged, 27 electorates were abolished, 19 electorates were created for the first time, and eight former electorates were re-established, including Rodney.

The 1981 census had shown that the North Island had experienced further population growth, and three additional general seats were created through the 1983 electoral redistribution, bringing the total number of electorates to 95. The South Island had, for the first time, experienced a population loss, but its number of general electorates was fixed at 25 since the 1967 electoral redistribution. More of the South Island population was moving to Christchurch, and two electorates were abolished, while two electorates were recreated. In the North Island, six electorates were newly created, three electorates were recreated (including Rodney), and six electorates were abolished.

The 1987 electoral redistribution took the continued population growth in the North Island into account, and two additional general electorates were created, bringing the total number of electorates to 97. In the South Island, the shift of population to Christchurch had continued. Overall, three electorates were newly created, three electorates were recreated, and four electorates were abolished (including Rodney). All of those electorates were in the North Island. Changes in the South Island were restricted to boundary changes. These changes came into effect with the 1987 election.

Rodney covers an area of the northern Auckland region from Warkworth in the north, south through the Hibiscus Coast to Auckland's northern urban fringe. High population growth in north and west Auckland has led to Rodney shrinking – Helensville and Kumeū were taken out in 1999, and the next major town to be removed was Wellsford after the 2006 census.

At the 2020 general election, Rodney was abolished, with the northern section around Warkworth being merged with most of Helensville into Kaipara ki Mahurangi, and the southern section becoming the bulk of the new Whangaparāoa electorate.

== History ==
Rodney was first created for the 1871 election and was represented by four MPs from 1871 to 1890: Harry Farnall 1871–1872 (resigned); John Sheehan 1872–1879 (elected for Thames in 1879); Seymour Thorne George 1879–1884 (retired); and William Pollock Moat 1884–1890 (retired).

Its first recreation was from the 1946 election to 1978, and was recreated for a single term six years later for the 1984 election.

Rodney was again recreated ahead of the change to mixed-member proportional (MMP) voting in 1996. Its original incarnation was coterminous with the district for which it is named – most of the old Albany seat minus its eponymous town, with a large section of Kaipara tacked onto the northern fringe. Both of these seats were held by National MPs – Lockwood Smith in Kaipara and then Deputy Prime Minister Don McKinnon in Albany. Smith won his party's nomination for what is a safe National seat and has held it until the 2011 election, when he stood as a list candidate only. In the 1996 election, Mike Lee came second standing as an independent.

=== Members of Parliament ===
==== Key ====
Independent National Green NZ First Labour

Election	Winner
1871 election	Harry Farnall
1872 by-election	John Sheehan
1876 election	John Sheehan
1879 election	Seymour George
1881 election	Seymour George
1884 election	William Moat
1887 election	William Moat
(Electorate abolished 1890–1946)
1946 election	Clifton Webb
1949 election	Clifton Webb
1951 election	Clifton Webb
1954 election	Jack Scott
1957 election	Jack Scott
1960 election	Jack Scott
1963 election	Jack Scott
1966 election	Jack Scott
1969 election	Peter Wilkinson
1972 election	Peter Wilkinson
1975 election	Peter Wilkinson
(Electorate abolished 1978–1984, see Albany)
1984 election	Don McKinnon
(Electorate abolished 1987–1996, see Albany)
1996 election	Lockwood Smith
1999 election	Lockwood Smith
2002 election	Lockwood Smith
2005 election	Lockwood Smith
2008 election	Lockwood Smith
2011 election	Mark Mitchell
2014 election	Mark Mitchell
2017 election	Mark Mitchell
(Electorate abolished in 2020; see Whangaparāoa)

=== List MPs ===
Members of Parliament elected from party lists in elections where that person also unsuccessfully contested the Rodney electorate. Unless otherwise stated, all MPs terms began and ended at general elections.

Election	Winner
1999 election	Penny Webster
1999 election	Sue Bradford
2002 election	Sue Bradford
2002 election	Craig McNair
2011 election	Tracey Martin
2014 election	Tracey Martin
2017 election	Tracey Martin
2017 election	Marja Lubeck

== Election results ==
=== 2017 election ===
2017 general election: Rodney
Notes:	Blue background denotes the winner of the electorate vote. Pink background denotes a candidate elected from their party list. Yellow background denotes an electorate win by a list member, or other incumbent. A ✓ or ✗ denotes status of any incumbent, win or lose respectively.						
Party	Candidate	Votes	%	±%	Party votes	%	±%
National	✓ Mark Mitchell	28,140	63.14	+0.14	27,010	61.02	−1.37
Labour	Marja Lubeck	8,579	19.25	+8.23	10,571	23.35	+11.05
NZ First	Tracey Martin	4,381	9.83	−0.32	3,955	8.73	−0.34
Green	Harrison Burnard	2,503	5.62	−3.25	2,084	4.60	−3.90
Opportunities	Brittany Owens	963	2.16	—	805	1.78	—
ACT					389	0.86	+0.37
Conservative					130	0.29	−6.46
Legalise Cannabis					116	0.26	−0.05
Māori Party					103	0.23	−0.13
Outdoors					32	0.07	—
United Future					27	0.06	−0.15
People's Party					20	0.04	—
Ban 1080					17	0.04	−0.03
Internet					11	0.02	−0.57 (Note: 2017 Internet Party swing is relative to the votes for Internet-Mana in 2014; it shared a party list with Mana Party in the 2014 election)
Democrats					8	0.02	−0.02
Mana Party					3	0.01	−0.58 (Note: 2017 Mana Party swing is relative to the votes for Internet-Mana in 2014; it shared a party list with the Internet Party in the 2014 election)
Informal votes		220			70		
Total valid votes		44,566			45,281		
Turnout		45,351					
National hold	Majority	19,561	43.89	−7.44			

=== 2014 election ===
2014 general election: Rodney
Notes:	Blue background denotes the winner of the electorate vote. Pink background denotes a candidate elected from their party list. Yellow background denotes an electorate win by a list member, or other incumbent. A ✓ or ✗ denotes status of any incumbent, win or lose respectively.						
Party	Candidate	Votes	%	±%	Party votes	%	±%
National	✓ Mark Mitchell	24,519	63.00	+9.46	24,051	61.02	−1.12
Labour	Eric Bolt	4,289	11.02	−2.65	4,847	12.30	−1.13
NZ First	Tracey Martin	3,951	10.15	+6.25	3,575	9.07	+2.10
Green	Malcolm McAll	3,454	8.87	+1.75	3,351	8.50	+0.03
Conservative	Anton Heyns	2,210	5.68	−15.55	2,661	6.75	+0.37
ACT	Beth Houlbrooke	244	0.63	+0.09	192	0.49	−0.70
Internet Mana					231	0.59	+0.44 (Note: 2014 Internet Mana swing is relative to the votes for Mana in 2011; it shared a party list with Internet in the 2014 election.)
Māori Party					142	0.36	+0.00
Legalise Cannabis					123	0.31	−0.08
United Future					81	0.21	−0.19
Ban 1080					29	0.07	+0.07
Democrats					15	0.04	+0.01
Independent Coalition					12	0.03	+0.03
Civilian					8	0.02	+0.02
Focus					5	0.01	+0.01
Informal votes		255			91		
Total valid votes		38,922			39,414		
Turnout		39,414	81.63	+3.58			
National hold	Majority	20,230	51.33	+19.02			

=== 2011 election ===
2011 general election: Rodney
Notes:	Blue background denotes the winner of the electorate vote. Pink background denotes a candidate elected from their party list. Yellow background denotes an electorate win by a list member, or other incumbent. A ✓ or ✗ denotes status of any incumbent, win or lose respectively.						
Party	Candidate	Votes	%	±%	Party votes	%	±%
National	Mark Mitchell	20,253	53.54	−6.87	23,967	62.15	+3.16
Conservative	Colin Craig	8,031	21.23	+21.23	2,459	6.38	+6.38
Labour	Christine Rose	5,170	13.67	−5.13	5,178	13.43	−7.19
Green	Teresa Moore	2,694	7.12	−0.57	3,265	8.47	+3.29
NZ First	Tracey Martin	1,476	3.90	−0.35	2,688	6.97	+2.44
ACT	Beth Houlbrooke	204	0.54	−4.15	460	1.19	−5.37
United Future					154	0.40	−0.36
Legalise Cannabis					151	0.39	+0.03
Māori Party					140	0.36	−0.12
Mana					58	0.15	+0.15
Libertarianz					18	0.05	+0.02
Democrats					13	0.03	+0.01
Alliance					12	0.03	−0.03
Informal votes		615			257		
Total valid votes		37,828			38,563		
National hold	Majority	12,222	32.31	−9.31			

Electorate (as at 26 November 2011): 49,407

=== 2008 election ===
2008 general election: Rodney
Notes:	Blue background denotes the winner of the electorate vote. Pink background denotes a candidate elected from their party list. Yellow background denotes an electorate win by a list member, or other incumbent. A ✓ or ✗ denotes status of any incumbent, win or lose respectively.						
Party	Candidate	Votes	%	±%	Party votes	%	±%
National	✓ Lockwood Smith	22,698	60.41		22,441	58.99	
Labour	Conor Roberts	7,063	18.80		7,842	20.61	
Green	David Hay	2,890	7.69		1,969	5.18	
ACT	Beryl Good	1,760	4.68		2,496	6.56	
NZ First	Tracey Martin	1,599	4.26		1,722	4.53	
Family Party	Karl Adams	735	1.96		226	0.59	
Kiwi	Simonne Dyer	581	1.55		327	0.86	
United Future	Kathleen Deal	245	0.65		288	0.76	
Progressive					197	0.52	
Māori Party					182	0.48	
Bill and Ben					150	0.39	
Legalise Cannabis					136	0.36	
Alliance					24	0.06	
Libertarianz					11	0.03	
Democrats					9	0.02	
Workers Party					8	0.02	
Pacific					5	0.01	
RAM					5	0.01	
RONZ					4	0.01	
Informal votes		226			107		
Total valid votes		37,571			38,042		
National hold	Majority	15,635	41.61	+10.57			

=== 2005 election ===
2005 general election: Rodney
Notes:	Blue background denotes the winner of the electorate vote. Pink background denotes a candidate elected from their party list. Yellow background denotes an electorate win by a list member, or other incumbent. A ✓ or ✗ denotes status of any incumbent, win or lose respectively.						
Party	Candidate	Votes	%	±%	Party votes	%	±%
National	✓ Lockwood Smith	20,651	55.57	+16.99	19,799	52.65	
Labour	Tony Dunlop	9,115	24.53	−0.85	10,462	27.82	
NZ First	Craig McNair	3,496	9.41		3,089	8.08	
Green	Graham Evans	1,918	5.16		1,631	4.34	
United Future	Peter Mountain	997	2.68		1,162	3.09	
ACT	Christopher Brown	450	1.21		678	1.80	
Progressive	Tony Sharrock	332	0.89		319	0.85	
Māori Party	Adell Dick	166	0.45		107	0.28	
Direct Democracy	Colin Punter	36	0.10		2	0.01	
Destiny					238	0.63	
Legalise Cannabis					58	0.15	
Christian Heritage					36	0.10	
Alliance					18	0.05	
Democrats					15	0.04	
Family Rights					8	0.02	
Libertarianz					7	0.02	
99 MP					6	0.02	
RONZ					6	0.02	
One NZ					3	0.01	
Informal votes		353			145		
Total valid votes		37,161			37,605		
National hold	Majority	11,536	31.04	+16.84			

=== 1999 election ===
Refer to Candidates in the New Zealand general election 1999 by electorate#Rodney for a list of candidates.
