= Advance New Zealand (1995) =

New Zealand political party

The Advance New Zealand Party was a New Zealand political party. It advocated for multiculturalism and the interests of ethnic minorities, and a substantial segment of its membership came from New Zealand's Pasifika communities.

== History ==
Advance NZ was registered on 10 August 1995. In the 1996 New Zealand general election, it submitted a party list of ten candidates, headed by England So'onalole. It also stood candidates in six electorates. It received 949 party votes (0.05% of the total), and did not win any seats.

Advance New Zealand merged into United New Zealand in 1997. Party leader England So'onalole made the decision to join United after much consultation with the party executive and membership, agreeing that United was the only party in parliament compatible with the values of Advance New Zealand. England stated "We assessed that we couldn't trust the economy to a Labour-Alliance grouping, National hasn't the community concern we seek, and New Zealand First has shown itself to be less than trustworthy with their attitude to immigrant populations."
