= John Cronin (New Zealand politician) =

New Zealand politician

John Michael Cronin MNZM is a New Zealand politician. As of 2008 he is the chairperson of the Bay of Plenty regional council, one of four councillors elected by the city of Tauranga. Previously, he has sought election to Parliament — in the 1993 election, he was the National Party's candidate to win the Tauranga electorate back from former National MP Winston Peters, and in the 1996 election, he led the small Superannuitants and Youth Action party and stood in the Waitakere electorate. He was not successful in either attempt.

Cronin is one of the proponents of the proposed move of the regional council offices from Whakatāne, to a green field site in Tauranga, a move expected to cost ratepayers over NZ$23 million.

He was awarded MNZM in the 2009 New Year Honours, for services to local body affairs and the community.
