= Asia Pacific United Party =

The Asia Pacific United Party was a New Zealand political party serving the country's Asian and Pasifika populations.

== History ==
It was formed in anticipation of the MMP electoral system, which made it easier for smaller parties to be elected. In the 1996 election, the party stood nine candidates won 0.02% of the vote, insufficient to gain any seats. During the election there were ballot paper mistakes confusing the Asia Pacific United Party with the Ethnic Minority Party.

The party, although registered, did not submit a list for the 1999 elections, and none of its electorate candidates were elected.

In October 2001 the Electoral Commission cancelled the registration of the party because its membership had fallen below 500 people. It subsequently merged with United New Zealand.

== See also ==
- Party lists in the 1996 New Zealand general election
