= Ethnic Minority Party =

New Zealand political party

The Ethnic Minority Party was a New Zealand political party which focused on Asian voters, particularly Chinese and Indian New Zealanders.

== History ==
The party was formed on 2 April 1996, and hoped to take advantage of the benefits given to smaller parties by the new MMP electoral system. It was organised and led by Robert Hum, an accountant and immigrant to New Zealand from Malaysia. The party's foundation came as the anti-immigration New Zealand First party made significant gains in the polls. In the 1996 elections, it stood a list of eleven candidates, and received 0.12% of the vote. During the election there were ballot paper mistakes confusing the Ethnic Minority Party with the Asia Pacific United Party.

Both Chinese and Indian New Zealanders were the bulk of the party supporters initially, but by the election's end it had gained much support from Korean and Filipino voters as well. Aditya Prakash, an Auckland cardiac surgeon, took over the leadership from Hum after the 1996 election. Prakash stated that Ethnic Minority were aiming to field candidates in the next local body elections in 1998. However, in April 1998, the Ethnic Minority Party was deregistered by the Electoral Commission after it decided to merge into the United New Zealand party.

At the 1999 election, many Ethnic Minority Party candidates were in high positions on the United's list. However, United won only a single seat, leaving the Ethnic Minority candidates outside Parliament. Later, United merged with Future New Zealand to create the modern United Future, and the Ethnic Minority influence has been considerably diluted.
