= Animals First =

Defunct political party in New Zealand

Animals First was a New Zealand political party dedicated to animal rights and animal welfare. In the 1996 elections, it won 0.17% of the vote, putting it in twelfth place. In the 1999 elections, it declined slightly, winning 0.16% of the vote (fourteenth place). The party was deregistered at its own request in 2000.

== See also ==
- Animal welfare in New Zealand
