= Libertarianz =

- Leader: Richard McGrath
- President: Shane Pleasance
- Deputy: Sean Fitzpatrick
- Founded: 1995
- Dissolved: 29 January 2014
- Ideology: Objectivist-based libertarianism
- International affiliation: Interlibertarians
- Colours: Royal and light blue

Libertarianz was a political party in New Zealand (hence the suffix -nz) that advocated libertarianism, favouring self-government and limiting the power of the government over the individual. Ayn Rand's philosophy of Objectivism was a major influence on the party. Its slogan "More Freedom, Less Government" is indicative of the party's basic policy platform. It went into recess and was de-registered by its own request in 29 January 2014.

== History ==
Libertarianz was founded in late 1995 by Ian Fraser, who served as the party's first leader. Later, Lindsay Perigo, a well-known New Zealand broadcaster for Radio New Zealand and TVNZ, assumed the leadership. Perigo was followed as leader by Peter Cresswell and then Russell Watkins. At the time of its deregistration the leader was Richard McGrath, and the Party president was Shane Pleasance.

The party's first campaign was the 1996 election, the first to be held under the MMP electoral system. Libertarianz's involvement in the election produced negligible public interest. They gained 671 votes (0.03%), which placed them in 19th place. In the 1999 elections, the party performed somewhat better, gaining 5,949 votes (0.29%). This put them in 11th place, and in fourth place among the parties which did not gain seats in parliament. Libertarianz did not contest the party vote in the 2002 elections – due to an oversight, the party's bank cheque was not transmitted to the electoral authorities by the appointed time. The party was therefore able to contest the election only through individual electorate candidates. Its five candidates gained 672 votes amongst them.

=== Darnton v Clark ===
On 29 June 2006, Bernard Darnton filed proceedings in the High Court, suing Helen Clark for allegedly misappropriating public funds to pay for the Labour Party's pledge cards during the 2005 election. Some commentators labelled the lawsuit a stunt, although it received some media coverage as concern about the "pledge card" funding grew. On Sunday 10 September 2006, the lawsuit was the subject of a front-page story in The Sunday Star-Times newspaper. The Labour party promptly accused the Libertarianz party of being part of a conspiracy with the National Party, alleging that the small party could not afford to bring such a case to court.

In October 2006, after the auditor-general released a report declaring that the misappropriation of funds was illegal, Labour and other political parties immediately announced that they would pay back the money. On 17 and 18 October, a majority, including the Labour Party, passed a law through Parliament to 'retrospectively validate' the spending, making it legal, which is required under the Public Finance Act 1989. In the circumstances, however, it also effectively makes the misspending immune from court proceedings. In response, the Libertarianz party declared 18 October 2006 to be "Banana Republic Day", and issued press releases.

=== Dissolution (2014) ===
In January 2014, Party Leader Richard McGrath asked the Electoral Commission to de-register the party, given that practical administrative tasks such as maintaining membership were rendered impossible by the part-time and voluntary status of its membership and executive. The commission de-registered the party on 29 January 2014. Instead, McGrath advised former party members to support ACT New Zealand, under the organisational leadership of newly elected party president Jamie Whyte.

== Election results (1996–2011) ==
Election	# of candidates nominated (electorate/list)	# of seats won	# of party votes	% of popular vote
1996	2 / 24	0	671	0.03%
1999	0 / 30	0	5,949	0.29%
2002	did not contest			
2005	11 / 28	0	946	0.04%
2008	16 / 36	0	1,176	0.05%
2011	9 / 27	0	1,405	0.07%

=== New Zealand general election, 2008 ===
The Libertarianz party contested the 2008 New Zealand General Election, which was held on 8 November. It fielded candidates in 16 electorates. Altogether, the party received 1,176 votes (0.05% of the total proportion of votes cast).

=== Mount Albert by-election 2009 ===
At the 13 June 2009 Mount Albert by-election, Julian Pistorius stood as the candidate for Libertarianz and polled in ninth place (39 votes), lowest of all party-affiliated candidates who contested that by-election.

== Notable candidates ==
- Stephen Berry, controversial politician

== See also ==
- List of libertarian political parties
- Gun politics in New Zealand
- New Zealand libertarian perspectives on LGBT rights
