= Candidates in the 1999 New Zealand general election by electorate =

New Zealand political candidates in the MMP era
Year	Party list	Candidates
1996	party lists	by electorate
1999	party lists	by electorate
2002	party lists	by electorate
2005	party lists	by electorate
2008	party lists	by electorate
2011	party lists	by electorate
2014	party lists	by electorate
2017	party lists	by electorate
2020	party lists	by electorate
2023	party lists	by electorate
2026	party lists	by electorate

67 electorate members of the New Zealand House of Representatives were to be elected in the general election on 27 November 1999. The tables below show the candidates for each electorate. Incumbent electorate MPs are highlighted in blue, and those candidates who were members of the previous parliament via their party list—regardless of which electorate they previously contested—are highlighted in red.

Where candidates were listed on their party's list, this is shown accordingly. There are a number of cases why candidates don't have a list ranking:

- Some candidates belong to a registered party, but they were not on their party's list – this is shown on "none".
- Some candidates belong to a registered party, but the party did not submit a party list – the list field is blank in this case.
- Some candidates belong to an unregistered party, and those cannot submit a party list – the list field is blank in this case.

At the 1999 general election, three registered parties did not submit a list:

- Asia Pacific United Party
- Mana Wahine Te Ira Tangata
- Te Tawharau

== General electorates ==
=== Albany ===
1999 general election: Albany
Notes:	Blue background denotes an incumbent. Pink background denotes a current list MP. Yellow background denotes a retiring MP.			
Party	Candidate	Notes	List #	Source
Independent	Callum Blair			
NZ First	Joy Brett		35	
Christian Heritage	Tony Corbett		45	
Green	Bera MacClement		39	
Alliance	Heather McConachy		12	
Labour	Hamish McCracken		60	
National	Murray McCully	Electorate MP since 1987	none	
NMP	Darag Rennie		8	
ACT	Mike Steeneveld		19	
Christian Democrats	Rob Wheeler		11	

=== Aoraki ===
1999 general election: Aoraki
Notes:	Blue background denotes an incumbent. Pink background denotes a current list MP. Yellow background denotes a retiring MP.			
Party	Candidate	Notes	List #	Source
NZ First	Albert Gould		none	
National	Wayne Marriott		50	
Legalise Cannabis	Christine Mitchell		14	
Green	David Musgrave		none	
ACT	Dean Richardson		44	
Alliance	Lynley Simmons		51	
Christian Heritage	McGregor Simpson		22	
Labour	Jim Sutton	First entered Parliament in 1984	11	

=== Auckland Central ===
1999 general election: Auckland Central
Notes:	Blue background denotes an incumbent. Pink background denotes a current list MP. Yellow background denotes a retiring MP.			
Party	Candidate	Notes	List #	Source
South Island	Gerry Campbell		5	
Communist League	Terence Coggan			
Blokes Liberation Front	Pieter de Jonge			
Christian Heritage	Dick Holland		10	
ACT	Donna Awatere Huata	MP since 1996	4	
Mana Māori	Tame Iti		1	
Alliance	Sandra Lee	MP since 1993	2	
National	Martin Poulsen		31	
NZ First	Dilip Rupa		36	
Green	Nándor Tánczos		5	
Labour	Judith Tizard	MP since 1990	19	

=== Banks Peninsula ===
1999 general election: Banks Peninsula
Notes:	Blue background denotes an incumbent. Pink background denotes a current list MP. Yellow background denotes a retiring MP.			
Party	Candidate	Notes	List #	Source
National	David Carter	MP since 1994	21	
NZ First	Charlie Crofts		31	
Green	Rod Donald	MP since 1996	2	
Labour	Ruth Dyson	MP since 1993	15	
Christian Heritage	Rosemary Francis		13	
Christian Democrats	Simon Melville Hadfield		none	
ACT	Paul King		37	
Independent	Ann Lewis			
Natural Law	David Lovell-Smith		3	
Alliance	Maevis Watson		53	

=== Bay of Plenty ===
1999 general election: Bay of Plenty
Notes:	Blue background denotes an incumbent. Pink background denotes a current list MP. Yellow background denotes a retiring MP.			
Party	Candidate	Notes	List #	Source
NZ First	Peter Brown	MP since 1996	2	
Te Tawharau	Willie Coates	Te Tawharau contested the electorate vote independently, but encouraged voters to give their party vote to Mana Māori. Coates, unlike other Te Tawharau candidates, was not on the Mana Māori list.		
Green	Margaret Collins		none	
ACT	Lynne Cook		49	
Labour	Terry Hughes		54	
Alliance	John Neill		55	
National	Tony Ryall	MP since 1990	9	
Christian Heritage	Joyce Stevens		42	
Christian Democrats	Judy Turner		14	
Natural Law	Mieke van Batenburg		42	

=== Christchurch Central ===
1999 general election: Christchurch Central
Notes:	Blue background denotes an incumbent. Pink background denotes a current list MP. Yellow background denotes a retiring MP.			
Party	Candidate	Notes	List #	Source
Independent	David Ball			
NZ First	John Ballantyne		33	
Labour	Tim Barnett	MP since 1996	none	
Christian Heritage	John Bryant		5	
National Democrats	Anton Foljambe			
Alliance	Liz Gordon	MP since 1996	8	
Communist League	Ruth Gray			
Christian Democrats	Daryl Gregory		7	
Dominion Workers	Clifford Mundy			
McGillicuddy Serious	Cecil G. Murgatroyd		14	
Green	Diana Pennell		23	
ACT	Katherine Sillars		28	
National	John Stringer		none	

=== Christchurch East ===
1999 general election: Christchurch East
Notes:	Blue background denotes an incumbent. Pink background denotes a current list MP. Yellow background denotes a retiring MP.			
Party	Candidate	Notes	List #	Source
ACT	Alan Beecham		43	
Legalise Cannabis	Michael Britnell		9	
Labour	Lianne Dalziel	MP since 1990	8	
Natural Law	Warwick Jones		25	
National	John Knox		none	
Christian Heritage	Judith Phillips		28	
Alliance	Paul Piesse		58	
NZ First	Margaret Silverlock		none	
Christian Democrats	Chantelle Stiles		none	
Green	Jacqui Wood		none	
Retiring incumbents and withdrawn candidates
Labour	Larry Sutherland			

=== Clutha-Southland ===
1999 general election: Clutha-Southland
Notes:	Blue background denotes an incumbent. Pink background denotes a current list MP. Yellow background denotes a retiring MP.			
Party	Candidate	Notes	List #	Source
Christian Heritage	Grant Bradfield		12	
National	Bill English	MP since 1996	4	
Green	Tim Gow		none	
South Island	Pat McCarrigan		2	
NZ First	Dave Mackie		24	
ACT	John Morrison		40	
Labour	Lesley Soper		44	
Independent	David Webber			
Alliance	Roger White		none	

=== Coromandel ===
1999 general election: Coromandel
Notes:	Blue background denotes an incumbent. Pink background denotes a current list MP. Yellow background denotes a retiring MP.			
Party	Candidate	Notes	List #	Source
Alliance	Tony Bird		30	
Green	Jeanette Fitzsimons	The Green Party split from the Alliance Party, who Fitzsimons had stood for in 1996	1	
Labour	Margaret Hawkeswood		58	
NZ First	Robyn McDonald	contested electorate in 1996	20	
National	Murray McLean	MP since 1996	none	
Christian Heritage	David Parlour		11	

=== Dunedin North ===
1999 general election: Dunedin North
Notes:	Blue background denotes an incumbent. Pink background denotes a current list MP. Yellow background denotes a retiring MP.			
Party	Candidate	Notes	List #	Source
NMP	Patrick Byrne		none	
ACT	Hilary Calvert		15	
Alliance	Quentin Findlay		48	
Christian Heritage	David Harris		63	
Labour	Pete Hodgson	MP since 1990	13	
South Island	Alan McDonald		1	
Legalise Cannabis	Paul John McMullan		7	
National	Katherine Rich		23	
McGillicuddy Serious	Bernard Smith		24	
Green	Michael Tritt		16	
NZ First	Donna Waipouri-Baxter		none	

=== Dunedin South ===
1999 general election: Dunedin South
Notes:	Blue background denotes an incumbent. Pink background denotes a current list MP. Yellow background denotes a retiring MP.			
Party	Candidate	Notes	List #	Source
Labour	David Benson-Pope		53	
NZ First	Jenny Bloxham		22	
National	Russell Keast		none	
Independent	Hendrik Koch			
South Island	Margaret McCarrigan		2	
Green	Sonata McLeod		none	
ACT	Willie Martin		46	
Alliance	Mark Ryan		11	
Christian Heritage	John Streekstra		64	

=== East Coast ===
1999 general election: East Coast
Notes:	Blue background denotes an incumbent. Pink background denotes a current list MP. Yellow background denotes a retiring MP.			
Party	Candidate	Notes	List #	Source
NZ First	Gray Eatwell		none	
Te Tawharau	Anton Kerekere	Te Tawharau contested the electorate vote independently, but encouraged voters to give their party vote to Mana Māori. Kerekere was number eight on the Mana Māori list.		
Labour	Janet Mackey	MP since 1993	28	
Alliance	Gavin Maclean		33	
Mana Wahine Te Ira Tangata	Harangi Manaena-Biddle			
National	Matthew Parkinson		57	
Christian Heritage	Richard Rangihuna		40	
ACT	Ian Swan		47	

=== Epsom ===
1999 general election: Epsom
Notes:	Blue background denotes an incumbent. Pink background denotes a current list MP. Yellow background denotes a retiring MP.			
Party	Candidate	Notes	List #	Source
Legalise Cannabis	Caleb Armstrong		6	
Natural Law	Ray Cain		16	
NZ First	Brent Catchpole		30	
ACT	Rodney Hide	Contested Auckland Central in 1996	5	
Labour	David Jacobs		none	
Independent	Michael MacDonald			
Christian Heritage	Ewen McQueen		3	
Green	Janet McVeagh		13	
Alliance	Mark O'Brien		none	
McGillicuddy Serious	Worik Turei Stanton		26	
National	Richard Worth		44	
Retiring incumbents and withdrawn candidates
National	Christine Fletcher			

=== Hamilton East ===
1999 general election: Hamilton East
Notes:	Blue background denotes an incumbent. Pink background denotes a current list MP. Yellow background denotes a retiring MP.			
Party	Candidate	Notes	List #	Source
Mauri Pacific	Helen Akhtari		14	
Natural Law	John Cleary		5	
ACT	Gavin Denby		51	
Christian Heritage	Madeleine Flannagan		20	
McGillicuddy Serious	Leanne V. Ireland		2	
Alliance	Peter Jamieson		38	
National	Tony Steel	First elected in 1990	none	
NZ First	Doug Woolerton	MP since 1996	5	
Labour	Dianne Yates	MP since 1993	22	

=== Hamilton West ===
1999 general election: Hamilton West
Notes:	Blue background denotes an incumbent. Pink background denotes a current list MP. Yellow background denotes a retiring MP.			
Party	Candidate	Notes	List #	Source
Independent	Pita Cammock			
Labour	Martin Gallagher	MP 1993–1996	none	
Christian Heritage	Eleanor Goodall		39	
NZ First	Athol Gould		none	
Mauri Pacific	Fa'amatuainu Iakopo		18	
Mana Wahine	Avon Johnson			
Alliance	Dave MacPherson		14	
ACT	Garry Mallett		65	
National	Bob Simcock	MP since 1996	22	

=== Hunua ===
1999 general election: Hunua
Notes:	Blue background denotes an incumbent. Pink background denotes a current list MP. Yellow background denotes a retiring MP.			
Party	Candidate	Notes	List #	Source
Christian Heritage	Ken Andrew		57	
NZ First	John Geary		none	
Alliance	Janice Graham		43	
Christian Democrats	Bill Henderson		none	
National	Warren Kyd	MP since 1987	none	
Natural Law	Raylene Lodge		19	
Labour	Paul Schofield		none	
ACT	John Thompson		36	

=== Hutt South ===
1999 general election: Hutt South
Notes:	Blue background denotes an incumbent. Pink background denotes a current list MP. Yellow background denotes a retiring MP.			
Party	Candidate	Notes	List #	Source
Independent	Lois McInnes			
Labour	Trevor Mallard	MP since 1984	12	
Green	Cliff Mason		40	
ACT	Christopher Milne		23	
Natural Law	Jon Muller		30	
Christian Democrats	David Ogden		13	
United NZ	Frank Owen		13	
Alliance	Gordon Parr		50	
NZ First	Edwin Perry		37	
National	Clare Radomske		none	
Christian Heritage	Rosemarie Thomas		7	
Mauri Pacific	Richard Waitai		20	
McGillicuddy Serious	Jonat Wharton		34	

=== Ilam ===
1999 general election: Ilam
Notes:	Blue background denotes an incumbent. Pink background denotes a current list MP. Yellow background denotes a retiring MP.			
Party	Candidate	Notes	List #	Source
Green	Evan Thomas Alty		15	
National	Gerry Brownlee	MP since 1996	36	
Christian Heritage	Geoff Francis		23	
NZ First	Andrew Gin		8	
Alliance	Lois Griffiths		47	
Christian Democrats	Kevin Harper		8	
ACT	Nigel Mattison		17	
Independent	Janet MiddleMiss			
Independent	Denis O'Rourke			
Natural Law	Brendan Rhodes		48	
Labour	Alison Wilkie		none	

=== Invercargill ===
1999 general election: Invercargill
Notes:	Blue background denotes an incumbent. Pink background denotes a current list MP. Yellow background denotes a retiring MP.			
Party	Candidate	Notes	List #	Source
Green	Craig Carson		44	
Alliance	Stephnie de Ruyter		22	
ACT	Matt McInnes		29	
Labour	Mark Peck	MP since 1993	27	
National	Eric Roy	MP since 1993	19	
NZ First	Allan Wise		14	
Christian Heritage	Russell Zwies		51	

=== Kaikoura ===
1999 general election: Kaikoura
Notes:	Blue background denotes an incumbent. Pink background denotes a current list MP. Yellow background denotes a retiring MP.			
Party	Candidate	Notes	List #	Source
Independent	Desmond Joseph Bell			
Natural Law	Anne Brigid		49	
Green	Ian Ewen-Street	Contested electorate in 1996	3	
McGillicuddy Serious	Rodney Hansen		4	
ACT	Graham James Hewett		39	
Labour	Brian McNamara		none	
Alliance	Lindsay Mehrtens		54	
Christian Heritage	Don Moore		48	
NZ First	Chris Rivers		17	
National	Lynda Scott		56	
Christian Democrats	Julee Smith-Mischeski		none	
Retiring incumbents and withdrawn candidates
Independent	Tom Harrison			
Alliance	Patrick Rooney	Withdrew after injured in a car crash	60	

=== Karapiro ===
1999 general election: Karapiro
Notes:	Blue background denotes an incumbent. Pink background denotes a current list MP. Yellow background denotes a retiring MP.			
Party	Candidate	Notes	List #	Source
Labour	Paul Cronin		none	
ACT	Andrew Davies		14	
Christian Heritage	Gavin Hockly		49	
Alliance	John Pemberton		37	
NZ First	Gordon Stewart		28	
National	Lindsay Tisch		none	
Mana Māori	Lai Toy		20	

=== Mana ===
1999 general election: Mana
Notes:	Blue background denotes an incumbent. Pink background denotes a current list MP. Yellow background denotes a retiring MP.			
Party	Candidate	Notes	List #	Source
Independent	Lance Anderson			
Independent	Bill Bevan			
United NZ	Graham Butterworth		7	
McGillicuddy Serious	John Creser		45	
Christian Democrats	Lance Huxford		none	
NZ First	Nigel Jones		none	
Labour	Graham Kelly	MP since 1987	17	
Alliance	Moira Ann Lawler		16	
Christian Heritage	Renton Maclachlan		29	
Mauri Pacific	Api Malu		22	
Asia Pacific	Lutena Mulitalo Mano'o			
Legalise Cannabis	David Moore		4	
NMP	David Pattinson		17	
Green	Robert Shaw		none	
National	Mark Thomas	Contested Wellington Central in 1996	28	
ACT	Darryl Ward		60	

=== Māngere ===
1999 general election: Māngere
Notes:	Blue background denotes an incumbent. Pink background denotes a current list MP. Yellow background denotes a retiring MP.			
Party	Candidate	Notes	List #	Source
Independent	Kelvyn Alp			
Natural Law	Grant Bilyard		46	
ACT	Adrian Jon Dixon		none	
Labour	Taito Phillip Field	MP since 1993	14	
NZ First	Jerry Hohepa		34	
Alliance	Finau Kolo		17	
Christian Heritage	Steven Aotearoa Panapa		52	
National	Sylvia Taylor		none	
Mana Wahine	Te Aroha Wepiha Reo			

=== Manukau East ===
1999 general election: Manukau East
Notes:	Blue background denotes an incumbent. Pink background denotes a current list MP. Yellow background denotes a retiring MP.			
Party	Candidate	Notes	List #	Source
Reform Party	Dave Bergersen			
NZ First	Malia Kamilo Hamani		none	
Alliance	Bruce Bennett Holm		56	
ACT	Charles Lowndes		22	
Labour	Ross Robertson		none	
Christian Heritage	David Simpkin		32	
Independent	Paul Teio			
Mauri Pacific	Danny Turia		11	
Workers Party	Daphna Whitmore			
Mana Wahine	Mareta Wiringi			
National	Ken Yee		55	

=== Manurewa ===
1999 general election: Manurewa
Notes:	Blue background denotes an incumbent. Pink background denotes a current list MP. Yellow background denotes a retiring MP.			
Party	Candidate	Notes	List #	Source
National	Enosa Auva'a		47	
Mauri Pacific	Ann Batten	Elected through the NZ First list in 1996, but defected to Mauri Pacific in 1998	5	
ACT	Lech Beltowski		30	
Labour	George Hawkins	MP since 1990	none	
Christian Heritage	Uaita Levi		38	
Alliance	Toia Lucas		none	
NZ First	Lindy Palmer		none	
Mana Wahine	Lumã'ava Samuelu-Pula			

=== Maungakiekie ===
1999 general election: Maungakiekie
Notes:	Blue background denotes an incumbent. Pink background denotes a current list MP. Yellow background denotes a retiring MP.			
Party	Candidate	Notes	List #	Source
Green	Jon Carapiet		51	
Independent	Tony Cranston			
Republican	Brian Freeth		2	
Labour	Mark Gosche	MP since 1996	20	
Independent	Sue Henry			
Christian Democrats	Jason Keiller		18	
Natural Law	Graeme Lodge		6	
NZ First	Gilbert Myles	First elected in 1990	10	
ACT	Angus Ogilvie		24	
Christian Heritage	Mary Paki		25	
Alliance	Matt Robson		3	
National	Belinda Vernon	MP since 1996	10	

=== Mount Albert ===
1999 general election: Mount Albert
Notes:	Blue background denotes an incumbent. Pink background denotes a current list MP. Yellow background denotes a retiring MP.			
Party	Candidate	Notes	List #	Source
National	Noelene Buckland		63	
Labour	Helen Clark	Clark, an MP since 1981, was the incumbent in the Owairaka electorate that was replaced by Mount Albert	1	
McGillicuddy Serious	Kerry Hoole		42	
United NZ	Hassan Hosseini		none	
Republican	Jane Hotere		4	
Green	Mike Johnson		none	
ACT	Daniel King		34	
NZ First	Seini Mafi		none	
Alliance	Jill Ovens		28	
Christian Heritage	Diane Taylor		50	

=== Mount Roskill ===
1999 general election: Mount Roskill
Notes:	Blue background denotes an incumbent. Pink background denotes a current list MP. Yellow background denotes a retiring MP.			
Party	Candidate	Notes	List #	Source
NZ First	Chris Comeskey		13	
Natural Law	Linda Davy		13	
Labour	Phil Goff	Goff, who was first elected in 1981, was the incumbent in New Lynn but stood in the new Mount Roskill electorate in 1999	7	
Green	Chris Hay		50	
Alliance	Sarah Martin		25	
Christian Heritage	Barrie Paterson		14	
United NZ	Yousuf Qureshi		none	
National	Phil Raffills		29	
ACT	Max Whitehead		13	

=== Napier ===
1999 general election: Napier
Notes:	Blue background denotes an incumbent. Pink background denotes a current list MP. Yellow background denotes a retiring MP.			
Party	Candidate	Notes	List #	Source
Labour	Geoff Braybrooke	MP since 1981	none	
ACT	Mel Chandler		58	
Christian Heritage	Bob Davis		53	
Green	Angie Denby		26	
Alliance	Robin Gwynn		21	
Christian Democrats	Allana Hiha		6	
Independent	Laurance McGregor			
NZ First	Lyola Randell-Cotter		none	
National	Anne Tolley		20	

=== Nelson ===
1999 general election: Nelson
Notes:	Blue background denotes an incumbent. Pink background denotes a current list MP. Yellow background denotes a retiring MP.			
Party	Candidate	Notes	List #	Source
Christian Heritage	Nick Barber		17	
Labour	Simon Fraser		none	
ACT	Philip Gully		none	
NMP	Suzanne Johnston		11	
Alliance	Mary O'Connor		32	
McGillicuddy Serious	Tim Owens		30	
National	Nick Smith	MP since 1990	8	
NZ First	Trevor Squires		none	
Green	Mike Ward		8	

=== New Plymouth ===
1999 general election: New Plymouth
Notes:	Blue background denotes an incumbent. Pink background denotes a current list MP. Yellow background denotes a retiring MP.			
Party	Candidate	Notes	List #	Source
Labour	Harry Duynhoven	First elected in 1987	29	
Mana Wahine Te Ira Tangata	Shona Eriksen			
Mauri Pacific	Sharon Faloon		16	
ACT	Moira Irving		33	
Alliance	Bonnie Johnstone		42	
National	Len Jury		none	
The People's Choice	Rusty Kane		1	
NZ First	Mae Neuman		40	
Christian Democrats	Tom Smithers		12	
Retiring incumbents and withdrawn candidates
Christian Heritage	Hasko Starrenberg	Selected by party but nomination was rejected	61	

=== North Shore ===
1999 general election: North Shore
Notes:	Blue background denotes an incumbent. Pink background denotes a current list MP. Yellow background denotes a retiring MP.			
Party	Candidate	Notes	List #	Source
Christian Democrats	Julie Belding		16	
Labour	Helen Duncan		30	
Christian Heritage	Mary-Anne Gladwell		55	
NZ First	Hine Grindlay		none	
Alliance	Jill Henry		none	
Green	Barry Larsen		none	
National	Wayne Mapp	MP since 1996	33	
ACT	Michael Pinkney		none	
Natural Law	Linda Sinden		22	

=== Northcote ===
1999 general election: Northcote
Notes:	Blue background denotes an incumbent. Pink background denotes a current list MP. Yellow background denotes a retiring MP.			
Party	Candidate	Notes	List #	Source
NZ First	John Bryant		none	
United NZ	Murray Callister		19	
Natural Law	Tony Cornelissen		32	
Alliance	Grant Gillon	Contested electorate in 1996	7	
Labour	Ann Hartley	Contested electorate in 1996	35	
Christians Against Abortion	Maria Matthews			
Christian Heritage	Mark Munroe		26	
Christian Democrats	Dave Perkin		22	
National	Ian Revell	MP since 1990	none	
Green	Jane Wells		45	
ACT	Alex Wong		16	

=== Northland ===
1999 general election: Northland
Notes:	Blue background denotes an incumbent. Pink background denotes a current list MP. Yellow background denotes a retiring MP.			
Party	Candidate	Notes	List #	Source
National	John Carter	MP since 1987	16	
ACT	Ria Gray-Lock		53	
NMP	Pauline Hallows		3	
Christian Heritage	Ned Jack		46	
Green	Janine McVeagh		9	
Christian Democrats	Mike Mitcalfe		none	
Independent	Mike Morel			
Labour	Les Robertson		none	
Independent	Eric Shackleton			
NZ First	Ian Walker		6	
Alliance	David Wilson		39	

=== Ohariu-Belmont ===
1999 general election: Ohariu-Belmont
Notes:	Blue background denotes an incumbent. Pink background denotes a current list MP. Yellow background denotes a retiring MP.			
Party	Candidate	Notes	List #	Source
ACT	Kathryn Asare		12	
NMP	Mark Atkin		6	
Labour	Derek Best		49	
Christian Democrats	Wayne Chapman		15	
United NZ	Peter Dunne	MP since 1984	1	
NZ First	Bruce Farland		none	
Asia Pacific	Sriram Gopalakrishnan			
McGillicuddy Serious	Philip John Grimmett		41	
Alliance	Rebecca Matthews		31	
Christian Heritage	Chris Salt		15	
Natural Law	Bruce Sowry		26	
Green	Caron Zillwood		14	

=== Otago ===
1999 general election: Otago
Notes:	Blue background denotes an incumbent. Pink background denotes a current list MP. Yellow background denotes a retiring MP.			
Party	Candidate	Notes	List #	Source
Labour	Val Dearman		61	
Green	Pip Direen		37	
ACT	Gerry Eckhoff		9	
Christian Heritage	Mike Ferguson		30	
National	Gavan Herlihy	MP since 1996	32	
Alliance	Bill Holvey		none	
South Island	Miles Notman		4	
NZ First	Stan Perkins		none	
NMP	Alison White		9	
Retiring incumbents and withdrawn candidates
McGillicuddy Serious	Donna Demente		9	

=== Otaki ===
1999 general election: Otaki
Notes:	Blue background denotes an incumbent. Pink background denotes a current list MP. Yellow background denotes a retiring MP.			
Party	Candidate	Notes	List #	Source
ACT	Brett Ambler		26	
NMP	Peter Archer		14	
One NZ	Wally Boyd		1	
Christian Heritage	Robin Corner		18	
Alliance	Russell Franklin		none	
NZ First	David Lionel Hayward		none	
Labour	Judy Keall	First elected in 1984	21	
Christian Democrats	Neville Morgan		none	
National	Roger Sowry	MP since 1990	7	
Green	Gary Williams		none	

=== Pakuranga ===
1999 general election: Pakuranga
Notes:	Blue background denotes an incumbent. Pink background denotes a current list MP. Yellow background denotes a retiring MP.			
Party	Candidate	Notes	List #	Source
Alliance	Trevor Lance Barnard		18	
Labour	Patrick Hine		none	
Christians Against Abortion	Jane Hudson			
NMP	Aaziq Mumtaz		10	
NZ First	Pita Paraone		19	
Christian Heritage	Barry Pepperell		36	
ACT	Dick Quax		11	
Green	David Rose		47	
Natural Law	Andrew Sanderson		36	
National	Maurice Williamson	MP since 1987	13	

=== Palmerston North ===
1999 general election: Palmerston North
Notes:	Blue background denotes an incumbent. Pink background denotes a current list MP. Yellow background denotes a retiring MP.			
Party	Candidate	Notes	List #	Source
Christian Democrats	Grant Bowater		5	
National	George Halligan		59	
Alliance	Gerard Hehir		15	
ACT	Steve Kidby		62	
NZ First	Keri James Kingi		none	
Labour	Steve Maharey	MP since 1990	3	
Natural Law	Tony Martin		9	
Green	Steve Rowsell		none	
Mauri Pacific	Trieste Te Awe Awe		15	
Christian Heritage	John Tonson		33	
Retiring incumbents and withdrawn candidates
NZ First	Trevor Jans	Contested electorate in 1996		

=== Port Waikato ===
1999 general election: Port Waikato
Notes:	Blue background denotes an incumbent. Pink background denotes a current list MP. Yellow background denotes a retiring MP.			
Party	Candidate	Notes	List #	Source
McGillicuddy Serious	Graeme Cairns		1	
ACT	Ian Carline		32	
NZ First	David Fowler		16	
Green	Olive Gallagher		49	
NMP	Brett Gifkins		12	
Mana Māori	Angeline Greensill		3	
Christian Heritage	Rick Hayward		none	
National	Paul Hutchison		38	
Natural Law	Martin Jelley		29	
Christian Democrats	Ray Knight		none	
Alliance	Donna Pokere-Phillips		40	
Labour	Trish Ryan		none	
Retiring incumbents and withdrawn candidates
National	Bill Birch			

=== Rakaia ===
1999 general election: Rakaia
Notes:	Blue background denotes an incumbent. Pink background denotes a current list MP. Yellow background denotes a retiring MP.			
Party	Candidate	Notes	List #	Source
Independent	Tim Dyer			
McGillicuddy Serious	Ross Edgar		56	
ACT	Andrew Power		48	
Christian Heritage	Martin Reid		37	
Labour	Diane Schurgers		none	
National	Jenny Shipley	MP since 1987	1	
Alliance	Annabel Taylor		none	
Green	Rex Verity		17	
NZ First	Bill Woods		21	

=== Rangitikei ===
1999 general election: Rangitikei
Notes:	Blue background denotes an incumbent. Pink background denotes a current list MP. Yellow background denotes a retiring MP.			
Party	Candidate	Notes	List #	Source
NZ First	Suzanne Bruce	Withdrew but name still appeared on the ballot paper	7	
United NZ	Jim Howard		5	
Christian Heritage	Vic Jarvis		8	
Alliance	Dion Martin		34	
National	Simon Power		37	
ACT	Jean Thompson		55	
Mauri Pacific	Kelly Waitai		21	
Labour	Craig Walsham		none	
Retiring incumbents and withdrawn candidates
National	Denis Marshall			

=== Rimutaka ===
1999 general election: Rimutaka
Notes:	Blue background denotes an incumbent. Pink background denotes a current list MP. Yellow background denotes a retiring MP.			
Party	Candidate	Notes	List #	Source
NZ First	John Hoani Cribb		none	
ACT	Owen Dance		none	
Christian Democrats	Geoff Hounsell		4	
Legalise Cannabis	Brian Jensen		8	
Asia Pacific	Naransamy Manoharan			
Green	Don Murray		24	
National	Stuart Blair Roddick		none	
Labour	Paul Swain	MP since 1990	26	
Alliance	Brendan Tracey		26	
Christian Heritage	Helma Vermeulen		16	

=== Rodney ===
1999 general election: Rodney
Notes:	Blue background denotes an incumbent. Pink background denotes a current list MP. Yellow background denotes a retiring MP.			
Party	Candidate	Notes	List #	Source
Green	Sue Bradford		4	
Christian Heritage	Tony Brebner		54	
Labour	Mark Domney		none	
Independent	Jill Jeffs			
Natural Law	Bryan Lee		1	
NZ First	Anne Martin		29	
National	Lockwood Smith	MP since 1984	5	
Alliance	Anna Sutherland		46	
ACT	Penny Webster		8	
Christian Democrats	Richard Wills		none	

=== Rongotai ===
1999 general election: Rongotai
Notes:	Blue background denotes an incumbent. Pink background denotes a current list MP. Yellow background denotes a retiring MP.			
Party	Candidate	Notes	List #	Source
National	Stuart Boag		64	
United NZ	Steve Bright		11	
Legalise Cannabis	Benjamin Clark		16	
Independent	Stephen Cotterall			
Christian Democrats	Linda Dring		19	
ACT	Stephen Franks		3	
NZ First	Raymond Hina		38	
Natural Law	Michael Hirst		23	
McGillicuddy Serious	K. T. Julian		5	
Labour	Annette King	First elected in 1984	4	
Asia Pacific	Rama Ramanathan			
Christian Heritage	Max Shierlaw		21	
Alliance	Vernon Tile		23	
Green	Richard Wernham		42	

=== Rotorua ===
1999 general election: Rotorua
Notes:	Blue background denotes an incumbent. Pink background denotes a current list MP. Yellow background denotes a retiring MP.			
Party	Candidate	Notes	List #	Source
National	Max Bradford	MP since 1990	15	
Labour	Steve Chadwick		43	
Green	Lynne Dempsey		21	
NZ First	Robert Dixon		27	
Alliance	Pirihira Kaio		57	
NZ Equal Rights Party	Cliff Lee			
Christian Democrats	Andrew James Parrington		none	
Christian Heritage	Ross Prichard		44	
Natural Law	Martin Sharp		39	

=== Tamaki ===
1999 general election: Tamaki
Notes:	Blue background denotes an incumbent. Pink background denotes a current list MP. Yellow background denotes a retiring MP.			
Party	Candidate	Notes	List #	Source
Independent	Geoff Arthurs			
Green	Francela Davies		none	
Christian Heritage	Victor Cedric Grubi		62	
McGillicuddy Serious	Michael-Garnet Holt		40	
Independent	Michael Joseph Lescher			
Christian Democrats	Bruce McGrail		17	
Republican	Samuel Mendes		5	
Christians Against Abortion	Phillip O'Connor			
Labour	Lynne Pillay		36	
Aotearoa Tenants Party	Areta Ransfield			
Alliance	Peter Conrad Romanovsky		49	
NZ First	Slavica Seric		none	
National	Clem Simich	MP since 1992	none	
ACT	Alex Swney		31	

=== Taranaki-King Country ===
1999 general election: Taranaki-King Country
Notes:	Blue background denotes an incumbent. Pink background denotes a current list MP. Yellow background denotes a retiring MP.			
Party	Candidate	Notes	List #	Source
National	Shane Ardern	MP since 1998	35	
Alliance	Kevin Campbell	Contested electorate in 1998 by-election	10	
NMP	Lance Griggs		none	
NZ First	Peter Haines		none	
ACT	Owen Jennings	Contested electorate in 1998 by-election	6	
Christian Heritage	Mark Jones		47	
Green	Sandra Lawrence		none	
Mauri Pacific	Raj Masters		12	
Labour	John Young		none	

=== Taupo ===
1999 general election: Taupo
Notes:	Blue background denotes an incumbent. Pink background denotes a current list MP. Yellow background denotes a retiring MP.			
Party	Candidate	Notes	List #	Source
Mauri Pacific	Rovina Anderson		9	
Labour	Mark Burton	MP since 1993	18	
Green	Nick Fisher		52	
NZ First	Ross Honeyfield		none	
Alliance	Wayne Morris		52	
Mana Wahine	Makere Rangitoheriri			
National	David Steele		39	
ACT	Richard Steele		none	
Christian Heritage	John van der Zee		56	

=== Tauranga ===
1999 general election: Tauranga
Notes:	Blue background denotes an incumbent. Pink background denotes a current list MP. Yellow background denotes a retiring MP.			
Party	Candidate	Notes	List #	Source
Christian Democrats	Larry Baldock		9	
NMP	Vivienne Berry-Evans		1	
Christian Heritage	Frank Grover	MP since 1996	6	
Independent	John Hepburn			
National	Katherine O'Regan	MP since 1984	27	
NZ First	Winston Peters	First elected in 1978	1	
Green	Karen Summerhays		31	
Alliance	Tekarehana Wicks		20	
Labour	Margaret Wilson		9	
Retiring incumbents and withdrawn candidates
ACT	Ken Shirley	Withdrew electorate candidacy to stand as list only, endorsed O'Regan		

=== Te Atatu ===
1999 general election: Te Atatu
Notes:	Blue background denotes an incumbent. Pink background denotes a current list MP. Yellow background denotes a retiring MP.			
Party	Candidate	Notes	List #	Source
Labour	Chris Carter	First elected in 1993	34	
NZ First	Jenine Clift		none	
Alliance	Laila Harré	MP since 1996	6	
ACT	Wayne Harris		61	
United NZ	John Hubscher		16	
Christian Democrats	Les McDonald		none	
Natural Law	Russell Mack		33	
National	Vanessa Neeson		none	
Christian Heritage	Murray Pirret		58	
Green	Adrian Tyler		none	

=== Titirangi ===
1999 general election: Titirangi
Notes:	Blue background denotes an incumbent. Pink background denotes a current list MP. Yellow background denotes a retiring MP.			
Party	Candidate	Notes	List #	Source
Green	Steve Abel		27	
Alliance	Evana Belich		35	
Labour	David Cunliffe		52	
Christian Democrats	Anne Drake		24	
Republican	Graham Gilfillan		3	
National	Marie Hasler	Hasler, first elected in 1990, was the incumbent in Waitakere but stood in the new Titirangi electorate in 1999	24	
Natural Law	Kay Morgan		38	
NZ First	Dawn Mullins		39	
Christian Heritage	Grant Peck		60	
Mauri Pacific	Peta Si'ulepa		3	
ACT	Barbara Steinijans		52	

=== Tukituki ===
1999 general election: Tukituki
Notes:	Blue background denotes an incumbent. Pink background denotes a current list MP. Yellow background denotes a retiring MP.			
Party	Candidate	Notes	List #	Source
Alliance	Harry Alchin-Smith		41	
Labour	Rick Barker	MP since 1993	31	
Christian Heritage	Margaret Burgess		35	
Green	Terry Creighton		none	
Natural Law	Ian McCullough		37	
ACT	John Ormond		21	
NZ First	Dennis Pennefather		none	
Legalise Cannabis	Allan Webb		2	
National	Larry White		54	

=== Waimakariri ===
1999 general election: Waimakariri
Notes:	Blue background denotes an incumbent. Pink background denotes a current list MP. Yellow background denotes a retiring MP.			
Party	Candidate	Notes	List #	Source
Natural Law	Mike Barthelmeh		44	
Labour	Clayton Cosgrove		none	
National	Gideon Couper		none	
Green	Charles Drace		none	
Independent	Andrew Leary			
NZ First	Ron Mark	MP since 1996	4	
Legalise Cannabis	Kevin Patrick O'Connell		3	
Christian Democrats	Yvonne Palmer		10	
ACT	Malcolm Spark		41	
Christian Heritage	Stephen Williams		34	
Alliance	John Wright	MP since 1996	4	
Retiring incumbents and withdrawn candidates
Labour	Mike Moore			

=== Wairarapa ===
1999 general election: Wairarapa
Notes:	Blue background denotes an incumbent. Pink background denotes a current list MP. Yellow background denotes a retiring MP.			
Party	Candidate	Notes	List #	Source
Christian Democrats	John Allen		none	
Labour	Georgina Beyer		40	
Green	Laurence Boomert		18	
ACT	Paul Booth		56	
Alliance	Cathy Casey		27	
Natural Law	Ian Douglas		2	
NZ First	Rob Harris		15	
National	Paul Henry		43	
Christian Heritage	Mike Lloyd		19	

=== Waitakere ===
1999 general election: Waitakere
Notes:	Blue background denotes an incumbent. Pink background denotes a current list MP. Yellow background denotes a retiring MP.			
Party	Candidate	Notes	List #	Source
NZ First	Arthur Albert		none	
Christian Heritage	Sandra Breckon		none	
Green	David Clendon		19	
NMP	Peter Harrison		2	
ACT	Bruce Howat		18	
Christian Democrats	Craig Hunt		20	
Labour	Jonathan Hunt	Contested Tamaki in 1996	6	
National	Brian Neeson	Neeson, an MP since 1990, was the incumbent in the abolished Waipareira electorate	34	
Republican	Greg Smith	Not to be confused with the McGillicuddy Serious Party candidate of the same name	1	
Alliance	Michael Treen		36	

=== Wellington Central ===
1999 general election: Wellington Central
Notes:	Blue background denotes an incumbent. Pink background denotes a current list MP. Yellow background denotes a retiring MP.			
Party	Candidate	Notes	List #	Source
Legalise Cannabis	Michael Appleby		1	
Independent	Lea Barker			
United NZ	Kent Clark		17	
Christian Heritage	Leona Emberson-Ready		41	
Asia Pacific	Bihua Fu			
Labour	Marian Hobbs	Contested Kaikoura in 1996	23	
Natural Law	Daniel Meares		24	
NZ First	Jonathan Mosen		11	
ACT	Richard Prebble	First elected in 1975	1	
McGillicuddy Serious	Amy Ross		19	
Independent	Marion Smith			
Christian Democrats	Anthony Walton		1	
Retiring incumbents and withdrawn candidates
Alliance	Phillida Bunkle	Withdrew electorate candidacy to stand as list only, endorsed Hobbs		

=== West Coast-Tasman ===
1999 general election: West Coast-Tasman
Notes:	Blue background denotes an incumbent. Pink background denotes a current list MP. Yellow background denotes a retiring MP.			
Party	Candidate	Notes	List #	Source
Christian Heritage	Derek Blight		27	
ACT	Richard Edmund Cox		35	
Green	Richard Davies		10	
Independent	George Halsey			
United NZ	Colin Jackson		10	
National	Rod O'Beirne		49	
Labour	Damien O'Connor	MP since 1993	none	
NZ First	Pat O'Dea		18	
McGillicuddy Serious	Steve Richards		3	
Legalise Cannabis	Jeanette Saxby		5	
Alliance	Iri Sinclair		none	
Independent	David Tranter			

=== Whanganui ===
1999 general election: Whanganui
Notes:	Blue background denotes an incumbent. Pink background denotes a current list MP. Yellow background denotes a retiring MP.			
Party	Candidate	Notes	List #	Source
NZ First	Graham Adams		23	
National	Chester Borrows		45	
Christian Heritage	Gael Donoghue		4	
Alliance	Deb Frederikse		29	
ACT	Morris Hey		54	
Independent	Mark Middleton			
Labour	Jill Pettis	MP since 1993	24	
Green	Julie Priddle		none	
Mauri Pacific	Rayna Waitai	Her father also stood (in the Ikaroa-Rāwhiti electorate)	17	

=== Whangarei ===
1999 general election: Whangarei
Notes:	Blue background denotes an incumbent. Pink background denotes a current list MP. Yellow background denotes a retiring MP.			
Party	Candidate	Notes	List #	Source
Alliance	Tricia Cutforth		19	
NMP	Andrew De Lautour		none	
NZ First	Brian Donnelly	MP since 1996	3	
Christian Heritage	Rod Harris		31	
National	Phil Heatley		42	
Labour	Denise Jelicich		47	
Mauri Pacific	Martin Kaipo		13	
Green	Derek Keene		none	
ACT	Muriel Newman	MP since 1996	7	
United NZ	Gray Phillips		14	
Mana Wahine Te Ira Tangata	Darl Tana			
Retiring incumbents and withdrawn candidates
National	John Banks			

=== Wigram ===
1999 general election: Wigram
Notes:	Blue background denotes an incumbent. Pink background denotes a current list MP. Yellow background denotes a retiring MP.			
Party	Candidate	Notes	List #	Source
Alliance	Jim Anderton	MP since 1984	1	
ACT	Glen Cowie		42	
Green	Frankie Dean		22	
Natural Law	Carolyn Drake		34	
Economic Euthenics	Michael Hansen			
NZ First	Andrew Johnston		none	
National	Angus McKay		41	
Christian Heritage	Ken Moore		43	
Labour	Mike Mora		none	
Independent	Eric Whitworth			

== Māori electorates ==
=== Hauraki Maori ===
1999 general election: Hauraki Māori
Notes:	Blue background denotes an incumbent. Pink background denotes a current list MP. Yellow background denotes a retiring MP.			
Party	Candidate	Notes	List #	Source
NZ First	Josie Marama Anderson		9	
Freedom Movement	Kororia Aperahama		3	
Natural Law	Selwyn Matia Austin		10	
Alliance	Willie Jackson		9	
National	George Tearoha Kahi		53	
Te Tawharau	Rangi Mclean	Te Tawharau contested the electorate vote independently, but encouraged voters to give their party vote to Mana Māori. Mclean was number five on the Mana Māori list.		
Mauri Pacific	Amokura Panoho		8	
Mana Māori	Gareth Seymour		14	
Labour	John Tamihere		none	
Christian Heritage	Tuhi Vahaakolo		9	

=== Ikaroa-Rāwhiti ===
1999 general election: Ikaroa-Rāwhiti
Notes:	Blue background denotes an incumbent. Pink background denotes a current list MP. Yellow background denotes a retiring MP.			
Party	Candidate	Notes	List #	Source
Christian Heritage	Peter Richard Amor		none	
Christian Democrats	Tiwha Patricia Blake		23	
Independent	Derek Fox			
NZ First	Bill Gudgeon		25	
Labour	Parekura Horomia		25	
Natural Law	Tim Irwin		21	
Aroha Ngia Tatou	Te Aroha Mei			
Mana Wahine	Beverly Rewa Nicholson			
Alliance	Des Ratima		13	
ACT	Vicky Robin		none	
National	Dale Stephens		40	
Mauri Pacific	Rana Waitai	His daughter also stood (in the Whanganui electorate)	17	
Freedom Movement	Jennifer Waitai-Rapana		1	

=== Te Tai Hauāuru ===
1999 general election: Te Tai Hauāuru
Notes:	Blue background denotes an incumbent. Pink background denotes a current list MP. Yellow background denotes a retiring MP.			
Party	Candidate	Notes	List #	Source
NZ First	Lorraine Anderson		32	
Mana Wahine	Antoine Brown			
Christian Democrats	Lee Edmonds		none	
Freedom Movement	Lei Graham		2	
Labour	Nanaia Mahuta		10	
Mana Māori	Ken Mair		7	
Mauri Pacific	Tuku Morgan		2	
National	Dennis Patuwairua		none	
Piri Wiri Tua	Dalvanius Prime			
Alliance	Joe Puketapu		none	
Christian Heritage	Jeannette Shramka		59	
The People's Choice	Doug Wilson		2	

=== Te Tai Tokerau ===
1999 general election: Te Tai Tokerau
Notes:	Blue background denotes an incumbent. Pink background denotes a current list MP. Yellow background denotes a retiring MP.			
Party	Candidate	Notes	List #	Source
NZ First	Anaru George		26	
Mauri Pacific	Tau Henare	MP since 1993	1	
Alliance	Ella Henry		none	
Freedom Movement	Atareta Kapa Hills		6	
Piri Wiri Tua	Te Kaiarahi Hui			
Independent	Dun Mihaka			
National	Tom Bowling Murray		none	
Independent	Marama Netana			
Christian Heritage	Jim Prime		24	
ACT	Nellie Rata		none	
Mana Wahine	Mere Rawiri-Tau			
Labour	Dover Samuels	MP since 1996	5	
Independent	Kingi Eruera Taurua			

=== Te Tai Tonga ===
1999 general election: Te Tai Tonga
Notes:	Blue background denotes an incumbent. Pink background denotes a current list MP. Yellow background denotes a retiring MP.			
Party	Candidate	Notes	List #	Source
National	JC (Cliff) Bedwell		none	
Christian Heritage	William George Ehau		none	
Aroha Ngia Tatou	Piripi Gray			
Christian Democrats	Witana Murray		21	
Labour	Mahara Okeroa		none	
ACT	John Peters		59	
Piri Wiri Tua Movement	Erena Rigby			
Mauri Pacific	Atawhai Tibble		7	
Alliance	Vern Winitana		24	
NZ First	Tu Wyllie		none	

=== Waiariki ===
1999 general election: Waiariki
Notes:	Blue background denotes an incumbent. Pink background denotes a current list MP. Yellow background denotes a retiring MP.			
Party	Candidate	Notes	List #	Source
NZ First	Kahukore Baker		12	
Te Tawharau	Tuariki Delamere	Te Tawharau contested the electorate vote independently, but encouraged voters to give their party vote to Mana Māori. Delamere was number two on the Mana Māori list.		
Future NZ	Toa Faulkner			
Mana Wahine	Alamein Kopu	Unable to contest list after missing nomination deadline	1	
National	George Ngatai		46	
Mauri Pacific	Te Orohi Paul		6	
Labour	Mita Ririnui		46	
Alliance	Arapeta Tahana		none	
Freedom Movement	Helen Wepiha-Tai		5	
Retiring incumbents and withdrawn candidates
Mana Māori	Tame Iti	Withdrew to stand in Auckland Central, endorsed Delamere		
