= Māori politics =

Politics of the Māori people

Māori politics (Māori: tōrangapū Māori) is the politics of the Māori people, who were the original inhabitants of New Zealand and who are now the country's largest minority.

Before the arrival of Pākehā (Europeans) in New Zealand, Māori society was based largely around tribal units, and chiefs (rangatira) provided political leadership. With the British settlers of the 19th century came a new British-style government. From the outset, Māori sought representation within this government, seeing it as a vital way to promote their people's rights and improve living standards.

Modern Māori politics can be seen as a subset of New Zealand politics in general, but has a number of distinguishing features, including advocacy for indigenous rights and Māori sovereignty. Many Māori politicians are members of major, historically European-dominated political parties, while others have formed separate Māori parties. For example, Te Pāti Māori, holding six of seven Māori electorates, is one such party. The state has devolved power to Māori entities in an arrangement described as co-governance.

== Pre-colonial Māori governance ==
Before the arrival of Pākehā (European settlers) in New Zealand, Māori society was based largely around communal units. A common misconception is that pre-colonial Māori governance was structured into the "rigid and static structural models" (p. 19) proposed by early ethnologists, such as Elsdon Best (1934):

The tribal organisation of the Maori included three different groups – the tribe (iwi), the clan (hapu), and the family group (whanau).... The clan or sub-tribe was composed of a number of family groups, and the sum of the clans (hapu) formed the tribe.

Twentieth century research "modified this model of tribal organisation, emphasising the role of the hapū ... as the largest effective corporate group which defended a territory or worked together in peaceful enterprises" Therefore, it is now understood that hapū were responsible for administering resources, land, and important community buildings, and were also responsible for warfare (particularly maintaining the waka).

Political leadership or governance in Māori society has traditionally come from two different groups of people – the Ariki and the Rangatira. The Ariki are "persons of the highest rank and seniority". Ariki did not operate in simple hierarchical organisations; despite what later "government officers were inclined to believe", Ariki have never been "the apex of a structured hierarchy of institutionalised tribal authority". Many positions overlap with Ariki holding multiple roles, including "head of an iwi, the rangatira of a hapū and the kaumātua of a whanau".

== Māori and colonial politics ==
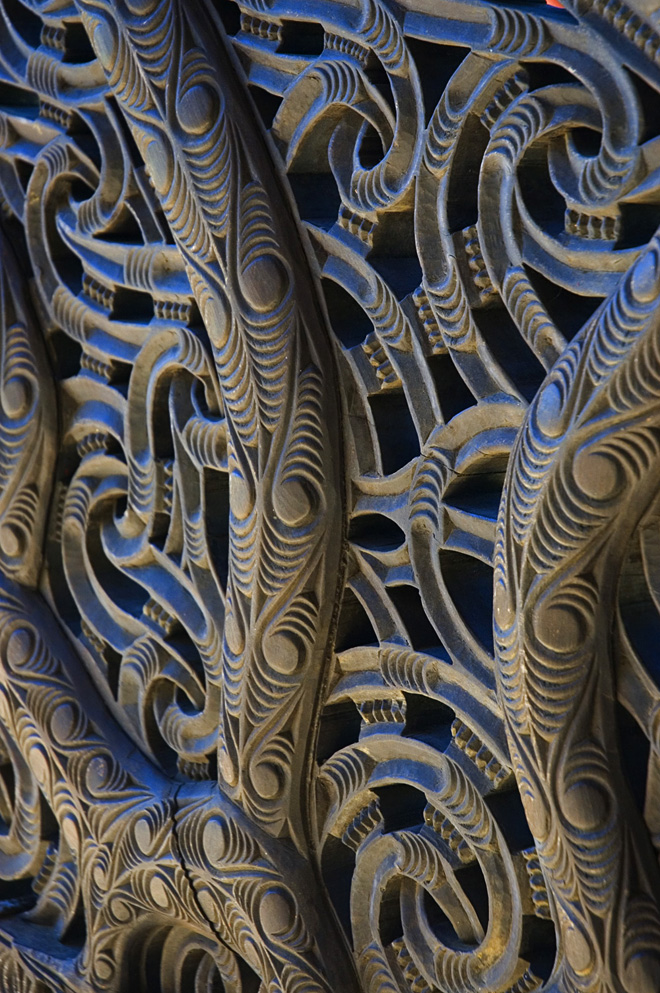
Māori wood carving, ceremonial war canoe, Waitangi

A constitution for New Zealand between Māori and the British Crown was signed in 1835 with the drawing up and agreement of the Declaration of Independence of New Zealand. The Māori-language document is often referred to as He Whakaputanga. The full Māori name is He Wakaputanga o te Rangatiratanga o Nu Tireni. This was a way for Māori tribal groups to assert their authority to the wider world and strengthen an alliance with Great Britain. He Whakaputenga partly came out of lawlessness amongst British subjects in New Zealand and on the British side was a response to French colonial competition.

In 1840 The Treaty of Waitangi (Te Tiriti o Waitangi), signed between various Māori iwi and the British Crown, had the practical effect of transferring sovereignty to the United Kingdom. The Māori language version had a different intent in which the Māori who signed agreed share power and authority with the British Governor whilst retaining authority over their people and territories. Māori leaders did not agree to release sovereignty to the Crown.

As settlement increased, the colonists became increasingly vocal in their call for self-government, separate from Great Britain. Māori land title was not understood by the settlers yet they actively pursued land sales. In 1852, the British government passed the New Zealand Constitution Act, establishing an elected New Zealand Parliament. Responsible government, where this Parliament had the authority to appoint Cabinet, was achieved a few years later. At first, Māori had little interest in the new Parliament, seeing it as a Pākehā institution with no real relevance to them because according to Te Tiriti they still had authority over their own resources and law.

Later, however, there was an increasing desire by Māori to participate in Parliament.The New Zealand Wars of the 1860s, coupled with ongoing land seizures, convinced many Māori that the "settler Parliament" now had a major impact on them, and that their voices needed to be heard in it.

There was never any law barring Māori from election to Parliament, nor barring them from voting, in practice, however, other laws made it virtually impossible. The major stumbling block was the property qualification, which required voters to own a certain amount of land. While Māori owned a large portion of New Zealand, most of this was held in common, not under individual title. As such, few individual Māori met the property requirement personally – even if they were part-owners of vast amounts of land, they did not have any land which they owned exclusively, and so did not qualify to vote.

In 1867, however, Parliament passed the Maori Representation Act, which created four special electorates for Māori. These seats did not have a property qualification. The creation of the seats was controversial, being opposed by those Pākehā who saw Māori as uncivilised. It was also opposed by a small group which felt that by creating separate Māori electorates, Māori would be sidelined, as Pākehā politicians would not have to consult Māori opinion as they would if Māori voted in general electorates. There was also debate about the number of seats – if Māori had been given a number of seats equivalent to their population, they would have had around fifteen seats, not four. One of the more radical MPs in Parliament, James FitzGerald, actually called for Māori to be given a third of the seats in Parliament, but this was widely seen as excessive. In the end, the seats were approved based mainly on a desire to improve relations with Māori and reduce military conflict. The first Māori MPs took their seats in 1868.

What are these four to do among so many Pakehas; where will their voices be as compared with the Pakeha voices?

— Ngāpuhi prophet Āperahama Taonui protesting that Māori were only to have four seats

It was intended that these seats would eventually be abolished as Māori abandoned traditional land ownership traditions. In the end, however, the seats were retained, and still exist today. There have, over the years, been a number of attempts to abolish them, with a number of different reasons being given – some said that reserving seats was unfair, while others said that keeping Māori electorates separate meant that Māori were marginalised and ignored by mainstream politicians. Many Māori politicians defended the electorates, saying that they were necessary to ensure Māori representation in Parliament. Other Māori leaders, however, said that the seats were not required – there have been Māori politicians who have gained election in non-Māori electorates.

== Māori in mainstream parties ==
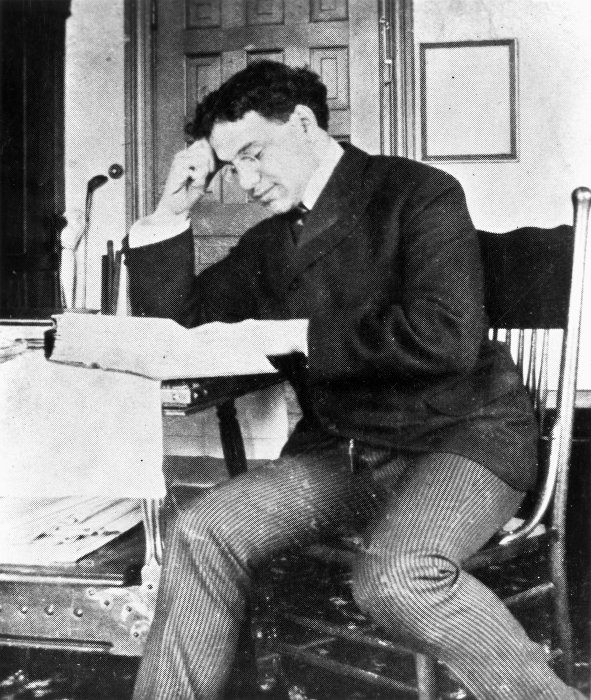
Maui Pomare, a member of the conservative Reform Party

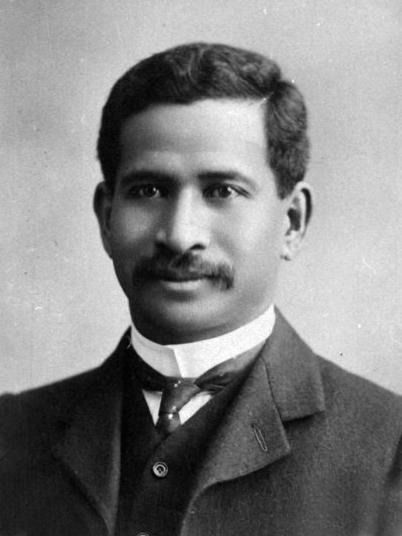
Āpirana Ngata, perhaps the most prominent Māori politician

When Māori MPs were first elected to Parliament, there were no formal political parties in New Zealand. After the Liberal Party was founded, however, it gained the support of a number of prominent Māori figures. The most prominent Māori to serve as a Liberal MP was Āpirana Ngata, who rose high within the Liberal Party's hierarchy. Ngata is said by many to be the most prominent Māori MP ever, and he is featured on New Zealand's fifty-dollar note. The Liberal Party did not have an exclusive control of the Māori electorates, however – Maui Pomare, another prominent Māori politician, was a member of the conservative and rural Reform Party, as were Taurekareka Henare and Taite Te Tomo. The Young Māori Party supported political action, but it was not a formal party.

In the 1930s, new movements began to arise in Māori politics. In particular, the Ratana church expanded its political participation, standing candidates for Parliament. In the 1935 election, Ratana won two of the four Māori electorates. The Ratana MPs did not remain independent for long, however – they quickly merged into the Labour Party, which they saw as best addressing Māori needs. By 1943, the Labour/Ratana alliance had won all four Māori electorates, establishing a pattern of dominance that many people thought was unbreakable. Among the most prominent Māori MPs in the Labour Party were Eruera Tirikatene, who was succeeded by his daughter, Whetu Tirikatene-Sullivan – both represented Southern Maori in Parliament for several decades.

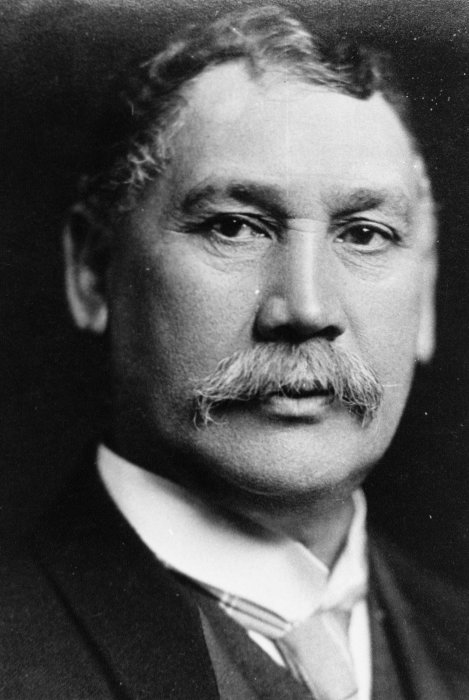
James Carroll, member of the Liberal Party

Despite Labour's dominance of the Māori vote, the National Party, Labour's main opponent, occasionally elected Māori MPs in general electorates. Ben Couch (Wairarapa) and Rex Austin (Awarua), were elected in 1975, the second and third Māori elected to a general seat (after Sir James Carroll in 1893). Winston Peters, elected to Tauranga in 1984 (he had previously stood for Northern Maori) is half Māori.

In the 1996 election, a major shift in Māori politics occurred when Labour lost all the Māori electorates (of which there were now five) to the New Zealand First party. New Zealand First, while not a Māori party, has a strong Māori wing, and its leader, Winston Peters (originally of the National Party), is half Māori. New Zealand First's clean sweep of the Māori electorates surprised many observers, who had believed that Labour's grip was too strong to be broken. In the 1999 election, Labour won all the Māori electorates back again, but the traditional Māori allegiance to Labour has been re-evaluated – Labour cannot, most observers say, simply take Māori support for granted.

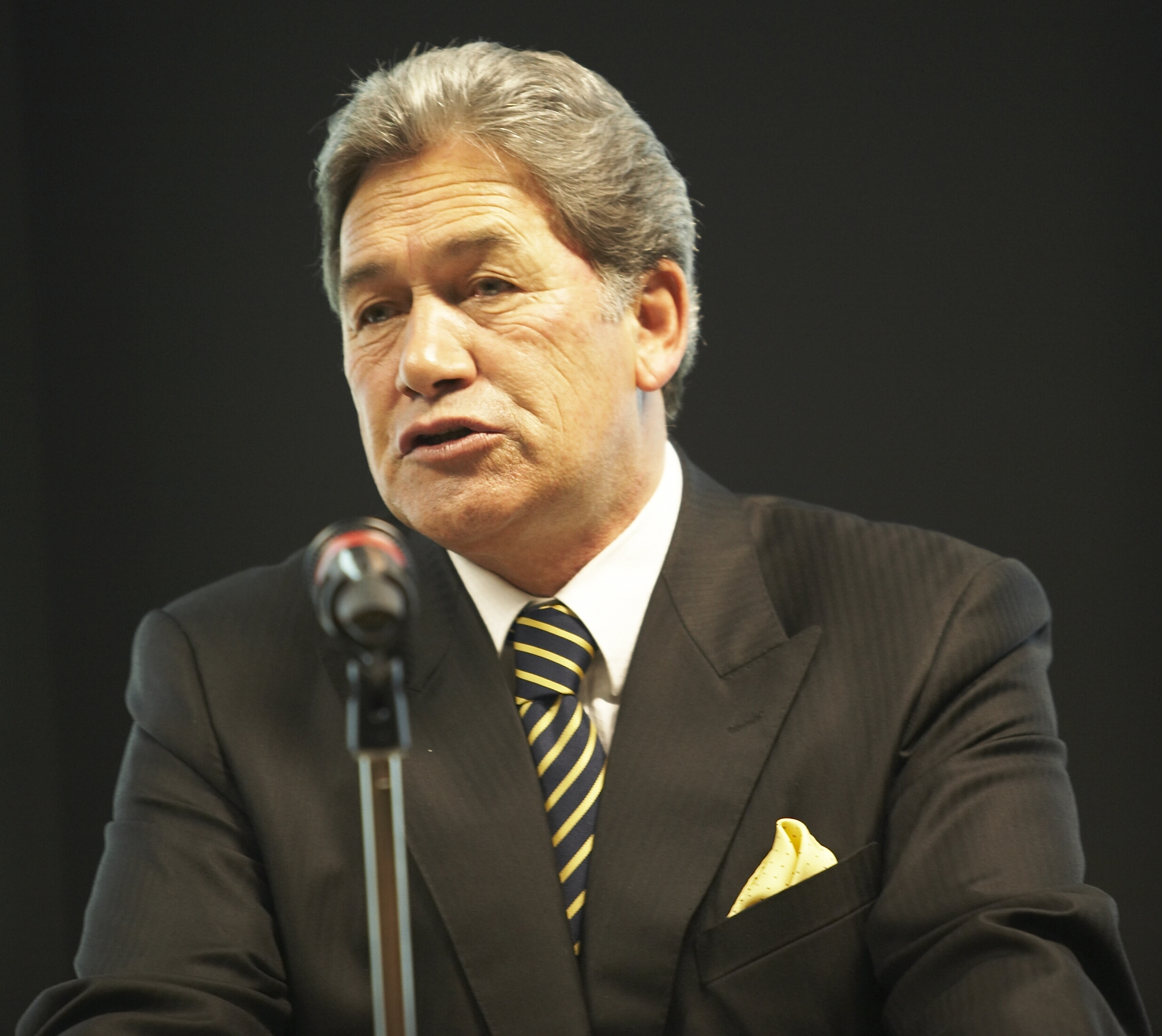
Winston Peters deputy prime minister of New Zealand from November 2023 to May 2025. This was his third time in the role, previously serving from 1996 to 1998 and 2017 to 2020

Since the advent of the MMP electoral system, Māori representation in Parliament has increased – Māori are able to be elected as list MPs, bypassing the problem of securing an electorate. This has been particularly noticeable in parties which have traditionally contained few Māori – MPs such as Georgina te Heuheu in the National Party and Donna Awatere Huata in the ACT party are not likely to have entered Parliament without MMP, given the difficulty that their parties would face contesting the Māori electorates. Following the 2023 election, the 54th New Zealand Parliament marks the highest-ever Māori representation, with 33 MPs across all six parties, compared to 25 in the previous term and 29 in the term prior to that. Labour has 9 Māori MPs, Te Pāti Māori has 6, Greens have 6, National has 5, NZ First has 4, and ACT has 3.

The introduction of MMP brought further calls for the abolition of the Māori electorates, which many deemed unnecessary in the new system. Despite the existence of the special electorates, Māori voter turnout has been consistently less than that of non-Māori.

== Māori parties ==
Throughout the history of Māori participation in mainstream parties, there have been those who argue that Māori cannot truly be represented unless they have a separate group. In recent years, with the resurgence of Māori culture, these calls have increased. In 1979, a Labour MP, Matiu Rata, quit the party to form his own group, saying that Māori could not succeed if they were simply a component of a larger group. Later, Tuariki Delamere would say much the same thing, claiming that "you cannot be accountable to Māori if your first allegiance is to a political vehicle that is owned and controlled by Pākehā." Tariana Turia broke from the Labour Party to co-found the Māori Party (also called Te Pāti Māori), which won four of the seven Māori seats in the 2005 election previously held by the Labour Party, and a fifth Māori seat in the 2008 election. Te Pāti Māori entered a confidence and supply agreement with the Fifth National Government in 2008 and two of its MPs became ministers outside Cabinet in that Government. This government was dissolved after the 2017 election, in which Te Pāti Māori lost all its seats in parliament and all Māori seats were captured by the mainstream Labour Party. In the 2023 election, Te Pāti Māori won six of the seven Māori seats.

Below are some of the parties which have been based around Māori voters, or which are sometimes seen as such.

=== Mana Motuhake (1980-2005) ===
Mana Motuhake, roughly translated as "self-government", was founded in 1979 as an independent Māori party by Labour MP Matiu Rata. Rata resigned from Parliament to contest a by-election under Mana Motuhake's banner, but was not re-elected. The party tried for some time to win the Māori electorates, but was never elected to Parliament. In 1991, Mana Motuhake joined the Alliance, a broad left-wing coalition. Under the Alliance, several Mana Motuhake members, including Sandra Lee-Vercoe and Willie Jackson, were elected to Parliament. When the Alliance split, Mana Motuhake remained with the hardline faction, which failed to retain any seats in Parliament. Mana Motuhake has since left the Alliance.

=== Mana Māori Movement (1993-2005) ===
The Mana Māori Movement was founded by Eva Rickard, a former candidate of Mana Motuhake. Rickard objected to the decision by Mana Motuhake to join the Alliance, believing that a completely independent Māori party was required. Mana Māori contested the Māori electorates, but never won a place in Parliament. In the most recent election, it worked in coalition with Te Tawharau and Piri Wiri Tua.

=== Mana Wahine (1998-2001) ===
Mana Wahine Te Ira Tangata, founded by former Alliance (Mana Motuhake) MP Alamein Kopu, stated its goal as promoting and protecting the interests of Māori women. Many of its opponents, however, claimed that the party was born out of Kopu's "opportunism", and denied that it had any real ideological commitment. Kopu was not re-elected.

=== Mauri Pacific (1998-2001) ===
Mauri Pacific, founded by five former New Zealand First MPs, denied that it was a Māori party, saying instead that it was merely "multiculturalist". It did, however, have policies that were strongly favourable towards Māori, and three of its five MPs (including its leader) were of Māori descent. This contributed to a widespread perception of it as a Māori party. The similarity of "Mauri" and "Māori" likely strengthened this view, although the words are unrelated. None of the party's MPs were re-elected, and it has since dissolved.

=== Te Tawharau (1995-2007) ===
Te Tawharau is a small Māori party which briefly held a seat in Parliament when Tuariki Delamere, a former New Zealand First MP, joined it. Delamere believed that an independent Māori voice was essential, saying that New Zealand First had tried and failed to balance Māori interests with other concerns. Delamere was not re-elected.

=== Piri Wiri Tua ===
The Piri Wiri Tua Movement was a small party based around the teachings of the Rātana church.

=== Te Pāti Māori ===
Te Pāti Māori (also commonly called "the Māori Party" in English) is the largest contemporary Māori political organisation. It was founded by Tariana Turia, a Labour MP who quit her party over the foreshore and seabed controversy, which Turia claims is seeing Māori deprived of their rights. She shared the party leadership with Pita Sharples, a Māori academic. The Māori Party hoped to win all seven Māori electorates in the next election, in 2005, although eventually won only four. Polls leading up to the election widely expected this – particularly for Labour MPs Nanaia Mahuta and Parekura Horomia to hold their seats. The party gained another seat in the 2008 election, although their share of the party vote remained low, with many Māori voters splitting their vote between a Māori Party MP and the Labour Party.

After the 2008 election, Te Pāti Māori agreed to support a minority National government on matters of confidence and supply, gaining ministerial posts for its co-leaders and commitments regarding the Māori electorates and the foreshore and seabed legislation. In 2011, the Māori Party won three out of the seven Māori electorates - both co-leaders winning their electorates (Pita Sharples - Tāmaki Makaurau, and Tariana Turia - Te Tai Hauāuru) and future Māori Party co-leader, Te Ururoa Flavell, winning the Waiariki electorate. In 2014, the Māori Party won one of seven Māori electorates with Te Ururoa Flavell winning the Waiariki seat again. This enabled Flavell's fellow co-leader Marama Fox to enter Parliament as a List MP due to the Māori Party reaching national vote threshold requirements.

The party was ousted from Parliament in the 2017 election, with Labour MP Tāmati Coffey winning Waiariki (the only seats held by the Māori Party) with 50.8% of the vote. This was analysed as being backlash for their support of National.

Under new left-wing leadership, Te Pāti Māori returned at the 2020 election, when Rawiri Waititi won the Waiariki electorate. Although the party's share of the country-wide party vote declined from 1.18% in 2017 to 1.17% in 2020, winning Waiariki gave the party the right to full proportional representation, giving it two MPs, with Debbie Ngarewa-Packer subsequently becoming a list MP. In the 2023 election, Te Pāti Māori won six electorate seats and 3.08% of the popular vote.

=== Mana Movement ===
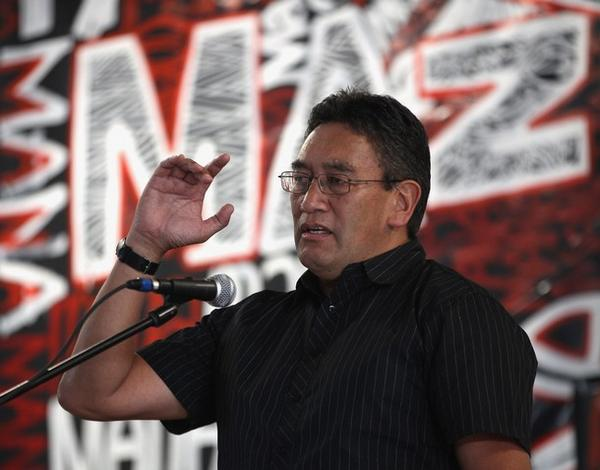
Hone Harawira is a Māori activist and leader of the Mana Movement

The Mana Movement is a New Zealand political party led by Hone Harawira which was formed in April 2011 following Hone Harawira's resignation from the Māori Party. Hone Harawira won the by-election in Te Tai Tokerau of 25 June 2011 for the Mana Party, and went on to retain this seat during the 2011 election. The party lost its one-seat during the 2014 election. The decision to work with the Internet Party is largely blamed for the loss because of the concerns people had with Internet Party's founder, and financier, Kim Dotcom.

The party ran again in the 2017 election but didn't win a seat. They did not run in the 2020 election or the 2023 election.

== Other sites of Māori political participation ==
Māori politics extends beyond participation within general elections. This includes government-recognised tribal organisations which have proliferated through the resolution of Treaty of Waitangi breaches and increased enthusiasm by Māori to receive and manage these returned assets. Māori also participate politically within iwi rūnanga, which are the governing councils or administrative groups for Māori hapū or iwi. Often, these tribal organisations work directly with local government. For example, the Independent Māori Statutory Board who informs the Auckland Council, as well as ensuring the council's compliance with statutory provisions under the Treaty of Waitangi.

=== Co-governance ===
Co-governance is a phrase used to describe various negotiated arrangements where Māori and the Crown share decision-making or "where Māori exercise a form of self-determination through a devolution of state power." Examples can include the co-management of natural resources (such as mountains and rivers) as part of Treaty of Waitangi settlements, the provision of social services to Māori by Māori-focused entities (such as Te Aka Whai Ora, the Māori Health Authority), and the guaranteed inclusion of Māori in local governance (via Māori wards and constituencies).

== Māori politicians ==
- Allan, Kiritapu
- Awatere Huata, Donna
- Bennett, Paula
- Beyer, Georgina
- Bond, Ria
- Bridges, Simon
- Te Rangi Hīroa
- Carroll, James
- Coffey, Tāmati
- Couch, Ben
- Davidson, Marama
- Davis, Kelvin
- Delamere, Tuariki
- Eagle, Paul
- Fenton, Darien
- Flavell, Te Ururoa
- Fox, Marama
- Gregory, Bruce
- Gudgeon, Bill
- Harawira, Hone
- Hauiti, Claudette
- Hawke, Joe
- Hayes, Joanne
- Henare, Peeni
- Henare, Taurekareka (Tau)
- Henare, Tau
- Hereora, Dave
- Hipango, Harete
- Horomia, Parekura
- Jackson, Willie
- Jones, Shane
- Katene, Rahui
- Kopu, Alamein
- Korako, Nuk
- Lee-Vercoe, Sandra
- Luxton, Jo
- Mackey, Moana
- Mahuta, Nanaia
- Maipi-Clarke, Hana-Rawhiti
- Marcroft, Jenny
- Mark, Ron
- Martin, Tracey
- Morgan, Tuku
- Ngata, Āpirana
- Ngarewa-Packer, Debbie
- Okeroa, Mahara
- Paraone, Pita
- Parata, Hekia
- Pere, Wi
- Perry, Edwin
- Peters, Ian
- Peters, Jim
- Peters, Winston
- Pettis, Jill
- Pomare, Maui
- Prime, Willow-Jean
- Rata, Matiu
- Rātana, Iriaka
- Reti, Shane
- Rickard, Eva
- Ririnui, Mita
- Roche, Denise
- Ross, Jami-Lee
- Rurawhe, Adrian
- Samuels, Dover
- Seymour, David
- Sharples, Pita
- Tabuteau, Fletcher
- Taiaroa, Hōri Kerei
- Tamihere, John
- Tangaere-Manuel, Cushla
- Tapsell, Peter
- Tawhai, Hone Mohi
- Te Heuheu, Georgina
- Tirikatene, Eruera
- Tirikatene, Rino
- Tirikatene-Sullivan, Whetu
- Turei, Metiria
- Turia, Tariana
- Waitai, Rana
- Waititi, Rawiri
- Wall, Louisa
- Wētere, Koro
- Whaitiri, Meka
- Williams, Arena
- Wyllie, Tu

== Terminology used in Māori politics ==
- Customary right – right acknowledged (usually via the Treaty of Waitangi) as being a traditional right of Māori
- Hui – tribal gathering, conference
- Mana – prestige, honour, respect, dignity, integrity
- Mana motuhake – self-government, autonomy
- Kotahitanga – unity, co-operation
- Māoritanga – Māori culture, identification with things Māori, "Māoriness"
- Pākehā – people of European descent, non-Māori
- Rangatiratanga – chieftainship, sovereignty
- Tino rangatiratanga – highest chieftainship, self-determination, absolute sovereignty
- Rūnanga – tribal council, administrative board
- Te Tiriti – the Treaty of Waitangi
- Tangata whenua – "people of the land"; indigenous people, Māori
- Tikanga Māori – the Māori way
- Waka Māori – a Māori political vehicle
- Kaitiaki – guardian, trustee

== See also ==
- Māori voting rights in Australia
- Māori wards and constituencies
- Structural discrimination in New Zealand
