= Party lists in the 1999 New Zealand general election =

New Zealand political candidates in the MMP era
Year	Party list	Candidates
1996	party lists	by electorate
1999	party lists	by electorate
2002	party lists	by electorate
2005	party lists	by electorate
2008	party lists	by electorate
2011	party lists	by electorate
2014	party lists	by electorate
2017	party lists	by electorate
2020	party lists	by electorate
2023	party lists	by electorate
2026	party lists	by electorate

This page provides the party lists put forward in New Zealand's 1999 election. Party lists determine (in the light of proportional voting) the appointment of list MPs under the mixed-member proportional (MMP) electoral system. Only registered parties are eligible for the party vote and are required to submit party lists. Unregistered parties that are only contesting electorates do not have party lists.

== Parliamentary parties ==
The following parties gained representation:

=== ACT New Zealand ===
Rank	Name	Incumbency	Contesting electorate	Previous rank	Change	Initial results	Later changes
1	Richard Prebble	Wellington Central	Wellington Central	1	0	✓ Elected from list	
2	Ken Shirley	List		3	+1	✓ Elected from list	
3	Stephen Franks		Rongotai	—	—	✓ Elected from list	
4	Donna Awatere Huata	List	Auckland Central	4	0	✓ Elected from list	
5	Rodney Hide	List	Epsom	7	+2	✓ Elected from list	
6	Owen Jennings	List	Taranaki-King Country	6	0	✓ Elected from list	
7	Muriel Newman	List	Whangarei	8	+1	✓ Elected from list	
8	Penny Webster		Rodney	—	—	✓ Elected from list	
9	Gerry Eckhoff		Otago	—	—	✓ Elected from list	
10	Heather Roy			—	—		
11	Dick Quax		Pakuranga	—	—		
12	Kathryn Asare		Ohariu-Belmont	—	—		
13	Max Whitehead		Mount Roskill	—	—		
14	Andrew Davies		Karapiro	—	—		
15	Hilary Calvert		Dunedin North	—	—		
16	Alex Wong		Northcote	—	—		
17	Nigel Mattison		Ilam	15	-2		
18	Bruce Howat		Waitakere	—	—		
19	Mike Steeneveld		Albany	14	-5		
20	Coral Wong			—	—		
21	John Ormond		Tukituki	10	-11		
22	Charles Lowndes		Manukau East	—	—		
23	Christopher Milne		Hutt South	11	-12		
24	Angus Ogilvie		Maungakiekie	28	+4		
25	Michael Coote			—	—		
26	Brett Ambler		Otaki	—	—		
27	Vijaya Charan			—	—		
28	Katharine Sillars		Christchurch Central	22	-6		
29	Matt McInnes		Invercargill	—	—		
30	Lech Beltowski		Manurewa	—	—		
31	Alex Swney		Tamaki	—	—		
32	Ian Carline		Port Waikato	—	—		
33	Moira Irving		New Plymouth	—	—		
34	Daniel King		Mount Albert	—	—		
35	Richard Cox		West Coast-Tasman	—	—		
36	John Thompson		Hunua	40	+4		
37	Paul King		Banks Peninsula	—	—		
38	Reg Turner			56	+18		
39	Graham Hewett		Kaikoura	—	—		
40	John Morrison		Clutha-Southland	—	—		
41	Malcolm Spark		Waimakariri	—	—		
42	Glen Cowie		Wigram	—	—		
43	Alan Beecham		Christchurch East	—	—		
44	Dean Richardson		Aoraki	37	-7		
45	Alan Wood			—	—		
46	Willie Martin		Dunedin South	—	—		
47	Ian Swan		East Coast	—	—		
48	Andrew Power		Rakaia	—	—		
49	Lynne Cook		Bay of Plenty	—	—		
50	Lynley McKerrow			—	—		
51	Gavin Denby		Hamilton East	—	—		
52	Barbara Steinijans		Titirangi	—	—		
53	Ria Gray-Lock		Northland	—	—		
54	Morris Hey		Whanganui	—	—		
55	Jean Thompson		Rangitikei	—	—		
56	Paul Booth		Wairarapa	—	—		
57	Trevor West			—	—		
58	Mel Chandler		Napier	—	—		
59	John Peters		Te Tai Tonga	—	—		
60	Darryl Ward		Mana	—	—		
61	Wayne Harris		Te Atatu	—	—		
62	Stephen Kidby		Palmerston North	—	—		
63	William Tripe			—	—		
64	Kati Unuia			—	—		
65	Garry Mallett		Hamilton West	27	-38		

=== Alliance ===
Rank	Name	Component Party	Incumbency	Contesting electorate	Previous rank	Change	Initial results	Later changes
1	Jim Anderton	NewLabour	Wigram	Wigram	1	0	✓ Won Wigram	
2	Sandra Lee	Mana Motuhake	List	Auckland Central	2	0	✓ Elected from list	
3	Matt Robson	NewLabour	List	Maungakiekie	7	+4	✓ Elected from list	
4	John Wright	Democrats	List	Waimakariri	4	0	✓ Elected from list	
5	Phillida Bunkle	none	List		9	+4	✓ Elected from list	
6	Laila Harré	NewLabour	List	Te Atatu	8	+2	✓ Elected from list	
7	Grant Gillon	Democrats	List	Northcote	11	+4	✓ Elected from list	
8	Liz Gordon	NewLabour	List	Christchurch Central	13	+5	✓ Elected from list	
9	Willie Jackson	Mana Motuhake		Hauraki Maori	20	+11	✓ Elected from list	
10	Kevin Campbell	NewLabour		Taranaki-King Country	48	+38	✓ Elected from list	
11	Mark Ryan	NewLabour		Dunedin South	—	—		
12	Heather-Ann McConachy	Democrats		Albany	18	+6		
13	Des Ratima	Mana Motuhake		Ikaroa-Rāwhiti	—	—		
14	Dave Macpherson	NewLabour		Hamilton West	14	0		
15	Gerard Hehir	NewLabour		Palmerston North	28	+13		
16	Moira Ann Lawler	NewLabour		Mana	46	+30		
17	Finau Kolo	-		Mangere	—	—		
18	Trevor Barnard	Democrats		Pakuranga	29	+11		
19	Tricia Cutforth	-		Whangarei	—	—		
20	Tekarehana Wicks	-		Tauranga	—	—		
21	Robin Gwynn	NewLabour		Napier	53	+32		
22	Stephnie de Ruyter	Democrats		Invercargill	—	—		
23	Vernon Tile	NewLabour		Rongotai	33	+10		
24	Vern Winitana	Mana Motuhake		Te Tai Tonga	—	—		
25	Sarah Martin	-		Mount Roskill	—	—		
26	Brendan Tracey	Democrats		Rimutaka	55	+29		
27	Cathy Casey	NewLabour		Wairarapa	—	—		
28	Jill Ovens	NewLabour		Mount Albert	—	—		
29	Deb Frederikse	Democrats		Whanganui	—	—		
30	Tony Bird	NewLabour		Coromandel	—	—		
31	Rebecca Matthews	-		Ohariu-Belmont	—	—		
32	Mary O'Connor	-		Nelson	—	—		
33	Gavin Maclean	-		East Coast	—	—		
34	Dion Martin	NewLabour		Rangitikei	—	—		
35	Evana Belich	-		Titirangi	—	—		
36	Mike Treen	NewLabour		Waitakere	—	—		
37	John Pemberton	Democrats		Karapiro	57	+20		
38	Peter Jamieson	-		Hamilton East	—	—		
39	David Wilson	Democrats		Northland	—	—		
40	Donna Pokere-Phillips	-		Port Waikato	—	—		
41	Harry Alchin-Smith	Democrats		Tukituki	41	0		
42	Bonnie Johnstone	-		New Plymouth	—	—		
43	Janice Graham	-		Hunua	—	—		
44	Te Pare Joseph	Mana Motuhake			58	+14		
45	Rewi James	Mana Motuhake			54	+9		
46	Anna Sutherland	-		Rodney	—	—		
47	Lois Griffiths	-		Ilam	—	—		
48	Quentin Findlay	NewLabour		Dunedin North	—	—		
49	Peter Conrad Romanovsky	-		Tamaki	—	—		
50	Gordon Parr	-		Hutt South	—	—		
51	Lynley Simmons	Democrats		Aoraki	—	—		
52	Wayne Morris	Democrats		Taupo	—	—		
53	Maevis Watson	NewLabour		Banks Peninsula	—	—		
54	Lindsay Mehrtens	-		Kaikoura	—	—		
55	John Neill	Liberal		Bay of Plenty	—	—		
56	Bruce Holm	-		Manukau East	—	—		
57	Pirihira Kaio	-		Rotorua	—	—		
58	Paul Piesse	NewLabour		Christchurch East	—	—		
59	Bill Mockridge	-			—	—		
60	Patrick Rooney	-			—	—		

=== Green Party ===
Rank	Name	Incumbency	Contesting electorate	Previous rank	Change	Initial results	Later changes
1	Jeanette Fitzsimons	List	Coromandel	(Alliance: 3)	+2	✓ Won Coromandel	
2	Rod Donald	List	Banks Peninsula	(Alliance: 10)	+8	✓ Elected from list	
3	Ian Ewen-Street		Kaikoura	(Alliance: 52)	+49	✓ Elected from list	
4	Sue Bradford		Rodney	—	—	✓ Elected from list	
5	Nándor Tánczos		Auckland Central	(Legalise Cannabis: 5)	0	✓ Elected from list	
6	Sue Kedgley			—	—	✓ Elected from list	
7	Keith Locke			(Alliance: 24)	+17	✓ Elected from list	
8	Mike Ward		Nelson	(Alliance: 47)	+39		
9	Janine McVeagh		Northland	—	—		
10	Richard Davies		West Coast-Tasman	(Alliance: 49)	+39		
11	Judy Bischoff			—	—		
12	Danna Glendining			(Alliance: 30)	+18		
13	Janet McVeagh		Epsom	—	—		
14	Caron Zillwood		Ohariu-Belmont	—	—		
15	Evan Alty		Ilam	—	—		
16	Michael Tritt		Dunedin North	—	—		
17	Rex Verity		Rakaia	(Alliance: 32)	+15		
18	Laurence Boomert		Wairarapa	(Progressive Greens: 5)	-13		
19	David Clendon		Waitakere	—	—		
20	Brendan Hoare			—	—		
21	Lynne Dempsey		Rotorua	—	—		
22	Frankie Dean		Wigram	—	—		
23	Diana Pennel		Christchurch Central	—	—		
24	Don Murray		Rimutaka	—	—		
25	Diana Mellor			—	—		
26	Angie Denby		Napier	—	—		
27	Stephen Abel		Titirangi	—	—		
28	Craig Potton			—	—		
29	Celia Wade-Brown			(Alliance: 44)	+15		
30	Toni Atkinson			—	—		
31	Karen Summerhays		Tauranga	—	—		
32	Jeremy Hall			—	—		
33	Deb Harding			—	—		
34	Ruth Gardner			—	—		
35	Pat McNamara			—	—		
36	Wayne Parsonson			—	—		
37	Pid Direen		Otago	—	—		
38	Clive Taylor			—	—		
39	Bera MacClement		Albany	—	—		
40	Cliff Mason		Hutt South	—	—		
41	Dianne Gillard			—	—		
42	Rich Wernham		Rongotai	—	—		
43	James Baynton			—	—		
44	Craig Carson		Invercargill	—	—		
45	Jane Wells		Northcote	—	—		
46	Chris Marshall			(Progressive Greens: 13)	-33		
47	David Rose		Pakuranga	—	—		
48	Robert Cawte			—	—		
49	Olive Gallagher		Port Waikato	—	—		
50	Chris Hay		Mount Roskill	—	—		
51	Jon Carapiet		Maungakiekie	—	—		
52	Nick Fisher		Taupo	—	—		
53	Jim Valley			—	—		
54	Greg Sawyer			—	—		

=== Labour Party ===
The Labour Party had 60 candidates on their list.

Rank	Name	Incumbency	Contesting electorate	Previous rank	Change	Initial results	Later changes
1	Helen Clark	Owairaka	Mount Albert	1	0	✓ Won Mount Albert	
2	Michael Cullen	Dunedin South		2	0	✓ Elected from list	
3	Steve Maharey	Palmerston North	Palmerston North	—	—	✓ Won Palmerston North	
4	Annette King	Rongotai	Rongotai	6	+2	✓ Won Rongotai	
5	Dover Samuels	List	Te Tai Tokerau	3	-2	✓ Won Te Tai Tokerau	
6	Jonathan Hunt	List	Waitakere	7	+1	✓ Elected from list	
7	Phil Goff	New Lynn	Mount Roskill	—	—	✓ Won Mount Roskill	
8	Lianne Dalziel	List	Christchurch East	4	-4	✓ Won Christchurch East	
9	Margaret Wilson		Tauranga	—	—	✓ Elected from list	
10	Nanaia Mahuta	List	Te Tai Hauāuru	8	-2	✓ Won Te Tai Hauāuru	
11	Jim Sutton	Aoraki	Aoraki	18	+7	✓ Won Aoraki	
12	Trevor Mallard	Hutt South	Hutt South	—	—	✓ Won Hutt South	
13	Pete Hodgson	Dunedin North	Dunedin North	30	+17	✓ Won Dunedin North	
14	Taito Phillip Field	Mangere	Mangere	—	—	✓ Won Mangere	
15	Ruth Dyson	List	Banks Peninsula	19	+4	✓ Won Banks Peninsula	
16	Tariana Turia	List		16	0	✓ Elected from list	
17	Graham Kelly	Mana	Mana	13	-4	✓ Won Mana	
18	Mark Burton	Taupo	Taupo	10	-8	✓ Won Taupo	
19	Judith Tizard	Auckland Central	Auckland Central	11	-8	✓ Won Auckland Central	
20	Mark Gosche	List	Maungakiekie	5	-15	✓ Won Maungakiekie	
21	Judy Keall	Otaki	Otaki	—	—	✓ Won Otaki	
22	Dianne Yates	List	Hamilton East	16	-6	✓ Elected from list	
23	Marian Hobbs	List	Wellington Central	12	-11	✓ Won Wellington Central	
24	Jill Pettis	Whanganui	Whanganui	14	-10	✓ Won Whanganui	
25	Parekura Horomia		Ikaroa-Rāwhiti	—	—	✓ Won Ikaroa-Rāwhiti	
26	Paul Swain	Rimutaka	Rimutaka	—	—	✓ Won Rimutaka	
27	Mark Peck	Invercargill	Invercargill	21	-6	✓ Won Invercargill	
28	Janet Mackey	Mahia	East Coast	17	-11	✓ Won East Coast	
29	Harry Duynhoven	New Plymouth	New Plymouth	—	—	✓ Won New Plymouth	
30	Helen Duncan	List	North Shore	22	-8	✓ Elected from list	
31	Rick Barker	Tukituki	Tukituki	28	-3	✓ Won Tukituki	
32	Joe Hawke	List		15	-17	✓ Elected from list	
33	Winnie Laban			—	—	✓ Elected from list	
34	Chris Carter	(Former MP)	Te Atatu	—	—	✓ Won Te Atatu	
35	Ann Hartley		Northcote	47	+12	✓ Won Northcote	
36	Lynne Pillay		Tamaki	—	—		
37	John Blincoe	(Former MP)		23	-14		
38	Eru George			—	—		
39	Georgina Beyer		Wairarapa	—	—	✓ Won Wairarapa	
40	Lili Tuioti			—	—		
41	Ashraf Choudhary			—	—		
42	Brenda Lowe-Johnson			—	—		
43	Steve Chadwick		Rotorua	—	—	✓ Won Rotorua	
44	Lesley Soper		Clutha-Southland	33	-11		
45	Gordon Duncan			—	—		
46	Mita Ririnui		Waiariki	—	—	✓ Won Waiariki	
47	Denise Jelicich		Whangarei	—	—		
48	Warren Lindberg			—	—		
49	Derek Best		Ohariu-Belmont	—	—		
50	Josie Karanga			—	—		
51	Tuipoloa Evan Charlton			—	—		
52	David Cunliffe		Titirangi	—	—	✓ Won Titirangi	
53	David Benson-Pope		Dunedin South	—	—	✓ Won Dunedin South	
54	Terry Hughes		Bay of Plenty	—	—		
55	Lindsay Rea			—	—		
56	Glen Cameron			—	—		
57	Kenneth Barclay			—	—		
58	Margaret Hawkeswood		Coromandel	—	—		
59	Tapihana Shelford			—	—		
60	Hamish McCracken		Albany	—	—		
61	Val Dearman		Otago	—	—		
62	David Shearer			—	—		
63	Lynette Stutz			35	-28		
64	Max Purnell			—	—		
65	Yani Johanson			—	—		

=== National Party ===
The National Party had 64 candidates on their list.

Rank	Name	Incumbency	Contesting electorate	Previous rank	Change	Initial results	Later changes
1	Jenny Shipley	Rakaia	Rakaia	4	+3	✓ Won Rakaia	
2	Wyatt Creech	Wairarapa		12	+10	✓ Elected from list	
3	Don McKinnon	List		2	-1	✓ Elected from list	✗ Left parliament in 2000
4	Bill English	Clutha-Southland	Clutha-Southland	9	+5	✓ Won Clutha-Southland	
5	Lockwood Smith	Rodney	Rodney	8	+3	✓ Won Rodney	
6	Georgina te Heuheu	List		7	+1	✓ Elected from list	
7	Roger Sowry	List	Otaki	15	+8	✓ Elected from list	
8	Nick Smith	Nelson	Nelson	30	+22	✓ Won Nelson	
9	Tony Ryall	Bay of Plenty	Bay of Plenty	29	+20	✓ Won Bay of Plenty	
10	Belinda Vernon	Maungakiekie	Maungakiekie	18	+8	✓ Elected from list	
11	Pansy Wong	List		26	+15	✓ Elected from list	
12	Simon Upton	List		11	-1	✓ Elected from list	✗ Left parliament in 2001
13	Maurice Williamson	Pakuranga	Pakuranga	20	+7	✓ Won Pakuranga	
14	John Luxton	Karapiro		33	+19	✓ Elected from list	
15	Max Bradford	Rotorua	Rotorua	—	—	✓ Elected from list	
16	John Carter	Northland	Northland	34	+18	✓ Won Northland	
17	Doug Kidd	Kaikoura		14	-3	✓ Elected from list	
18	Annabel Young	List		28	+10	✓ Elected from list	
19	Eric Roy	List	Invercargill	23	+4	✓ Elected from list	
20	Anne Tolley		Napier	—	—	✓ Elected from list	
21	David Carter	Banks Peninsula	Banks Peninsula	41	+20	✓ Elected from list	
22	Bob Simcock	Hamilton West	Hamilton West	45	+23	✓ Elected from list	
23	Katherine Rich		Dunedin North	—	—	✓ Elected from list	
24	Marie Hasler	Waitakere	Titirangi	27	+3	✓ Elected from list	
25	Arthur Anae	List		19	-6	✗ Lost seat	✓ Replaced Don McKinnon in 2000
26	Alec Neill	List		31	+5	✗ Lost seat	✓ Replaced Simon Upton in 2001
27	Katherine O'Regan	List	Tauranga	10	-17	✗ Lost seat	
28	Mark Thomas		Mana	49	+21		
29	Phil Raffills		Mount Roskill	46	+17		
30	Kerry Prendergast			—	—		
31	Martin Poulson			—	—		
32	Gavan Herlihy	Otago	Otago	57	+25	✓ Won Otago	
33	Wayne Mapp	North Shore	North Shore	58	+25	✓ Won North Shore	
34	Brian Neeson	Waipareira	Waitakere	35	+1	✓ Won Waitakere	
35	Shane Ardern	Taranaki-King Country	Taranaki-King Country	—	—	✓ Won Taranaki-King Country	
36	Gerry Brownlee	Ilam	Ilam	47	+11	✓ Won Ilam	
37	Simon Power		Rangitikei	—	—	✓ Won Rangitikei	
38	Paul Hutchison		Port Waikato	—	—	✓ Won Port Waikato	
39	David Steele		Taupo	—	—		
40	Dale Stephens		Ikaroa-Rāwhiti	—	—		
41	Angus McKay		Wigram	—	—		
42	Phil Heatley		Whangarei	—	—	✓ Won Whangarei	
43	Paul Henry		Wairarapa	—	—		
44	Richard Worth		Epsom	—	—	✓ Won Epsom	
45	Chester Borrows		Whanganui	—	—		
46	George Ngatai		Waiariki	—	—		
47	Enosa Auva'a		Manurewa	(Christian Coalition: 41)	-6		
48	Bret Bestic			—	—		
49	Rod O'Beirne		West Coast-Tasman	—	—		
50	Wayne Marriott		Aoraki	—	—		
51	Stephen Rainbow			—	—		
52	Tim Macindoe			(United New Zealand: 11)	-41		
53	George Kahi			—	—		
54	Larry White		Tukituki	—	—		
55	Ken Yee		Manukau East	64	+9		
56	Lynda Scott		Kaikoura	—	—	✓ Won Kaikoura	
57	Matthew Parkinson		East Coast	—	—		
58	Dawn Honeybun			—	—		
59	George Halligan		Palmerston North	—	—		
60	Grant McCallum			—	—		
61	Peggy Burrows			—	—		
62	Toni Millar			—	—		
63	Noelene Buckland		Mount Albert	—	—		
64	Stuart Boag		Rongotai	54	-10		

=== New Zealand First ===
Rank	Name	Incumbency	Contesting electorate	Previous rank	Change	Initial results	Later changes
1	Winston Peters	Tauranga	Tauranga	1	0	✓ Won Tauranga	
2	Peter Brown	List	Bay of Plenty	13	+11	✓ Elected from list	
3	Brian Donnelly	List	Whangarei	6	+3	✓ Elected from list	
4	Ron Mark	List	Waimakariri	11	+7	✓ Elected from list	
5	Doug Woolerton	List	Hamilton East	8	+3	✓ Elected from list	
6	Ian Walker		Northland	—	—		
7	Suzanne Bruce		Rangitikei	—	—		
8	Andrew Gin		Ilam	—	—		
9	Josie Anderson		Hauraki Maori	—	—		
10	Gilbert Myles	List	Maungakiekie	15	+5	✗ Lost seat	
11	Jonathan Mosen		Wellington Central	—	—		
12	Kahukore Baker		Waiariki	—	—		
13	Chris Comesky		Mount Roskill	—	—		
14	Allan Wise		Invercargill	—	—		
15	Rob Harris		Wairarapa	—	—		
16	David Fowler		Port Waikato	—	—		
17	Chris Rivers		Kaikoura	—	—		
18	Pat O'Dea		West Coast-Tasman	—	—		
19	Pita Paraone		Pakuranga	—	—		
20	Robyn McDonald	List	Coromandel	14	-6	✗ Lost seat	
21	Bill Woods		Rakaia	—	—		
22	Jenny Bloxham	List	Dunedin South	5	-17	✗ Lost seat	
23	Graham Adams		Whanganui	—	—		
24	Dave Mackie		Clutha-Southland	—	—		
25	Bill Gudgeon		Ikaroa-Rāwhiti	—	—		
26	Anaru George		Te Tai Tokerau	—	—		
27	Robert Dixon		Rotorua	—	—		
28	Gordon Stewart		Karapiro	—	—		
29	Anne Martin		Rodney	—	—		
30	Brent Catchpole		Epsom	—	—		
31	Charlie Crofts		Banks Peninsula	—	—		
32	Lorraine Anderson		Te Tai Hauāuru	—	—		
33	John Ballantyne		Christchurch Central	—	—		
34	Jerry Hohepa		Māngere	—	—		
35	Joy Brett		Albany	—	—		
36	Dilip Rupa		Auckland Central	—	—		
37	Edwin Perry		Hutt South	—	—		
38	Raymond Hina		Rongotai	—	—		
39	Dawn Mullins		Titirangi	52	+13		
40	Mae Neuman		New Plymouth	—	—		

=== United NZ Party ===
Rank	Name	Incumbency	Contesting electorate	Previous rank	Change	Initial results	Later changes
1	Peter Dunne	Ohariu-Belmont	Ohariu-Belmont	3	+2	✓ Won Ohariu-Belmont	
2	Mike Sheppard			—	—		
3	Aditya Prakash Kashyap			—	—		
4	Ram Prakash			—	—		
5	Jim Howard		Rangitikei	(Conservatives: 18)	+13		
6	Woon Kim			—	—		
7	Graham Butterworth		Mana	18	+11		
8	Kookie Samin			—	—		
9	Rehana Qureshi		Mount Roskill	—	—		
10	Colin Jackson		West Coast-Tasman	—	—		
11	Steven Bright		Rongotai	14	+3		
12	Maata Fuimaono			—	—		
13	Frank Owen		Hutt South	13	0		
14	Gray Phillips		Whangarei	29	+15		
15	Bryan Mockridge			20	+5		
16	John Hubscher		Te Atatu	26	+10		
17	Kent Clark		Wellington Central	—	—		
18	Yousuf Qureshi		Mount Roskill	—	—		
19	Murray Callister		Northcote	—	—		
20	Atiqur Rahman			—	—		
21	Pathik Vyas			(Ethnic Minority: 4)	-17		
22	Seyed Hosseni			—	—		

== Unsuccessful registered parties ==
The following registered parties did not gain representation:

=== Animals First ===
Rank	Name	Incumbency	Contesting electorate	Previous rank	Change	Initial results	Later changes
1	Alistar Mckellow			7	+6		
2	Adrienne Hall			—	—		
3	Susan Walker			2	-1		
4	Terri Walsh			3	-1		
5	Bettina Brown			—	—		
6	Brenda Walker			—	—		
7	Janice Strong			—	—		
8	Jan Cumming			—	—		
9	Peter Crosse			6	-3		
10	Neville Lynch			—	—		

=== Aotearoa Legalise Cannabis Party ===
Rank	Name	Incumbency	Contesting electorate	Previous rank	Change	Initial results	Later changes
1	Michael Appleby		Wellington Central	1	0		
2	Allan Webb		Tukituki	—	—		
3	Kevin O’Connell		Waimakariri	—	—		
4	David Moore		Mana	—	—		
5	Jeanette Saxby		West Coast-Tasman	—	—		
6	Caleb Armstrong		Epsom	—	—		
7	Paul Mcmullan		Dunedin North	—	—		
8	Brian Jensen		Rimutaka	—	—		
9	Mike Britnell		Christchurch East	—	—		
10	Daya Moi			—	—		
11	Kerry Gooch			—	—		
12	Evelyn Adele Shingleton			—	—		
13	Teresa Aporo			—	—		
14	Christine Mitchell		Aoraki	—	—		
15	Daniel Hovell			—	—		
16	Benjamin Clark		Rongotai	—	—		
17	Riki Joyce			—	—		

=== Christian Heritage Party ===
Rank	Name	Incumbency	Contesting electorate	Previous rank	Change	Initial results	Later changes
1	Graham Capill			(Christian Coalition: 2)	+1		
2	Philip Sherry			—	—		
3	Ewen McQueen		Epsom	(Christian Coalition: 4)	+1		
4	Gael Donoghue		Whanganui	(Christian Coalition: 11)	+7		
5	John Bryant		Christchurch Central	—	—		
6	Frank Grover	List	Tauranga	(Alliance: 5)	-1	✗ Lost seat	
7	Rosemarie Thomas		Hutt South	(Christian Coalition: 15)	+8		
8	Vic Jarvis		Rangitikei	(Christian Coalition: 20)	+12		
9	Tuhi Vahaakolo		Hauraki Maori	—	—		
10	Dick Holland		Auckland Central	—	—		
11	David Parlour		Coromandel	—	—		
12	Grant Bradfield		Clutha-Southland	(Christian Coalition: 6)	-6		
13	Rosemary Francis		Banks Peninsula	(Christian Coalition: 22)	+9		
14	Barrie Paterson		Mount Roskill	(Christian Coalition: 26)	+12		
15	Chris Salt		Ohariu-Belmont	—	—		
16	Helma Vermeulen		Rimutaka	(Christian Coalition: 24)	+8		
17	Nick Barber		Nelson	(Christian Coalition: 18)	+1		
18	Robin Corner		Otaki	(Christian Coalition: 14)	-4		
19	Mike Lloyd		Wairarapa	(Christian Coalition: 10)	-9		
20	Madeleine Flannagan		Hamilton East	—	—		
21	Max Shierlaw		Rongotai	—	—		
22	McGregor Simpson		Aoraki	—	—		
23	Geoff Francis		Ilam	(Christian Coalition: 32)	+9		
24	Jim Prime		Te Tai Tokerau	—	—		
25	Mary Paki			—	—		
26	Mark Munroe		Northcote	—	—		
27	Derek Blight		West Coast-Tasman	—	—		
28	Judith Phillips		Christchurch East	(Christian Coalition: 29)	+1		
29	Renton Maclauchlan		Mana	(Christian Coalition: 36)	+7		
30	Mike Ferguson		Otago	—	—		
31	Rod Harris		Whangarei	—	—		
32	David Simpkin		Manukau East	—	—		
33	John Tonson		Palmerston North	—	—		
34	Steve Williams			—	—		
35	Margaret Burgess		Tukituki	—	—		
36	Barry Pepperell		Pakuranga	(Christian Coalition: 40)	+4		
37	Martin Reid		Rakaia	—	—		
38	Uaita Levi		Manurewa	—	—		
39	Eleanor Goodall		Hamilton West	(Christian Coalition: 37)	-2		
40	Richard Rangihuna		East Coast	—	—		
41	Leona Emberson-Ready		Wellington Central	—	—		
42	Joyce Stevens		Bay of Plenty	—	—		
43	Ken Moore		Wigram	—	—		
44	Ross Prichard		Rotorua	—	—		
45	Tony Corbett		Albany	—	—		
46	Ned Jack		Northland	—	—		
47	Mark Jones		Taranaki-King Country	—	—		
48	Don Moore		Kaikoura	—	—		
49	Gavin Hockly		Karapiro	—	—		
50	Diane Taylor		Mount Albert	—	—		
51	Russell Zwies		Invercargill	—	—		
52	Steve Panapa		Māngere	—	—		
53	Bob Davis		Napier	—	—		
54	Tony Brebner		Rodney	—	—		
55	Mary-Anne Gladwell		North Shore	—	—		
56	John van der Zee		Taupo	—	—		
57	Ken Andrew		Hunua	—	—		
58	Murray Pirret		Te Atatu	—	—		
59	Jeannette Shramka		Te Tai Hauāuru	—	—		
60	Grant Peck		Titirangi	—	—		
61	Hasko Starrenberg			—	—		
62	Victor Grubi		Tamaki	—	—		
63	David Harris		Dunedin North	—	—		
64	John Streekstra		Dunedin South	—	—		

=== Freedom Movement ===
Rank	Name	Incumbency	Contesting electorate	Previous rank	Change	Initial results	Later changes
1	Jennifer Waitai-Rapana		Ikaroa-Rāwhiti	—	—		
2	Lei Graham		Te Tai Hauāuru	—	—		
3	Kororia Ettie Rawinia (Abraham) Aperahama		Hauraki Maori	—	—		
4	Miiria Macushla Mako			—	—		
5	Helen Te Uruiria Wepiha-Tai		Waiariki	—	—		
6	Atareta Kapa Hills		Te Tai Tokerau	—	—		
7	Arahi R Hagger			—	—		
8	Priscilla Ann Maxwell			—	—		
9	Trevor Sorenson			—	—		
10	Kevin Leonard Kapea			—	—		
11	Taukiri Abraham			—	—		
12	Te Rino Kotene Rapana			—	—		
13	Mereana Pari			—	—		
14	Myna Yvonne Rangiamohia Paraha-Richmond			—	—		
15	Chrissie B Zurcher			—	—		
16	Carol Grace Arnold			—	—		
17	Whare Ngarare Mehana			—	—		
18	Hone Hamiora Piripi Paki			—	—		
19	Annette Christine Paki			—	—		
20	Wiremu Abraham			—	—		
21	Donna Louise Plumridge			—	—		
22	Jaaron Turei Moore			—	—		
23	Florence Plumridge			—	—		
24	Whetu-Ote-Ata Aranui			—	—		
25	Okeroa Denise Waitai			—	—		
26	Tutere Tai			—	—		
27	William Ernest Abraham			—	—		
28	Mary-Anne Waitai			—	—		
29	Te Wairangi (Lavinia) Pere			—	—		
30	Michelle Ngauta Wroe			—	—		
31	Bill Nathan Piriwiritua Thompson			—	—		
32	Te Kura (Edward) Pairama			—	—		
33	Jared Steve Abbott			—	—		
34	Catherine Chisholm			—	—		
35	Vanessa Tewaa Rangitakatu			—	—		
36	Te Aira Nyman			—	—		
37	John Haki Huia			—	—		
38	Maraea Mere Hapi-Crowe			—	—		
39	Kim Sonia Maxwell			—	—		
40	Tina Mouri Johnston-Downs			—	—		

=== Future New Zealand ===
Rank	Name	Incumbency	Contesting electorate	Previous rank	Change	Initial results	Later changes
1	Anthony Walton		Wellington Central	—	—		
2	David Brown			—	—		
3	Murray Smith			(Christian Coalition: 13)	+10		
4	Geoffrey Hounsell		Rimutaka	(Christian Coalition: 12)	+8		
5	Grant Bowater		Palmerston North	(Christian Coalition: 16)	+11		
6	Kanui Hiha		Napier	—	—		
7	Daryl Gregory		Christchurch Central	—	—		
8	Kevin Harper		Ilam	(Christian Coalition: 17)	+9		
9	Larry Baldock		Tauranga	—	—		
10	Yvonne Palmer		Waimakariri	—	—		
11	Robert Wheeler		Albany	—	—		
12	Tom Smithers		New Plymouth	—	—		
13	David Ogden		Hutt South	—	—		
14	Judy Turner		Bay of Plenty	—	—		
15	Wayne Chapman		Ohariu-Belmont	(Christian Coalition: 28)	+13		
16	Julie Belding		North Shore	(Christian Coalition: 8)	-8		
17	Bruce McGrail		Tamaki	—	—		
18	Jason Keiller		Maungakiekie	(NZ First: 20)	+2		
19	Linda Dring		Rongotai	—	—		
20	Craig Hunt		Waitakere	—	—		
21	Witana Murray		Te Tai Tonga	—	—		
22	David Perkin		Northcote	—	—		
23	Tiwha Blake		Ikaroa-Rāwhiti	—	—		
24	Anne Drake		Titirangi	—	—		
25	Martyn Seddon			—	—		

=== Libertarianz ===
Rank	Name	Incumbency	Contesting electorate	Previous rank	Change	Initial results	Later changes
1	Lindsay Perigo			1	0		
2	Richard McGrath			—	—		
3	Deborah Coddington			2	-1		
4	Bernard Darnton			—	—		
5	Tina White			—	—		
6	Peter Linton			—	—		
7	Larry Timberlake			—	—		
8	Sally O'Brien			—	—		
9	Julian Darby			—	—		
10	Chris Lewis			—	—		
11	Peter Cresswell			4	-7		
12	Paul McDonald			—	—		
13	Anna Woolf			17	+4		
14	Joy Faulkner			—	—		
15	Robert Winefield			—	—		
16	Scott Alsweiler			—	—		
17	Keith Patterson			6	-11		
18	Andrew Couper			—	—		
19	Robert White			15	-4		
20	Andrew Bates			—	—		
21	Michael Murphy			—	—		
22	Mark McCombe			—	—		
23	Nikolas Haden			9	-14		
24	Chris Robertson			—	—		
25	Mike Webber			—	—		
26	Richard Wiig			—	—		
27	Russell Watkins			—	—		
28	Hughes			—	—		
29	Derek Bull			—	—		
30	Ken Riddle			—	—		

=== McGillicuddy Serious ===
Rank	Name	Incumbency	Contesting electorate	Previous rank	Change	Initial results	Later changes
1	Graeme Cairns		Port Waikato	65	+64		
2	Leanne Ireland		Hamilton East	55	+53		
3	Steve Richards		West Coast-Tasman	6	+3		
4	Rodney Hansen		Kaikoura	33	+29		
5	K T Julian		Rongotai	4	-1		
6	Val Smith			7	+1		
7	Peter Caldwell			18	+11		
8	Greg Smith			10	+2		
9	Donna Demente			—	—		
10	Paul Smith			9	-1		
11	Robyn West			5	-6		
12	Adrian Holroyd			20	+8		
13	Johana Sanders			52	+39		
14	Cecil Murgatroyd		Christchurch Central	—	—		
15	Penni Bousfield			2	-13		
16	Grant Knowles			15	-1		
17	Heidi Borchardt			43	+26		
18	Paull Cooke			3	-15		
19	Amy Ross		Wellington Central	—	—		
20	Rebekah Coogan			—	—		
21	Derek Craig			30	+9		
22	Douglas Mackie			14	-8		
23	Mark Servian			1	-22		
24	Bernard Smith		Dunedin North	8	-16		
25	Paul Beere			23	-2		
26	Worik Stanton-Turei		Epsom	—	—		
27	Metiria Turei-Stanton			(Legalise Cannabis: 4)	-23		
28	Phil Clayton			61	+33		
29	Megan Seawright			—	—		
30	Tim Owens		Nelson	19	-11		
31	Antony Deaker			—	—		
32	Colin Howie			—	—		
33	Adrienne Carthew			26	-7		
34	Jonat Wharton		Hutt South	21	-13		
35	Paula Hudson			—	—		
36	Helen Thornton			—	—		
37	Amy Macdonald			—	—		
38	David McGregor			—	—		
39	Fiona Jack			—	—		
40	Michael-Garnet Holt		Tamaki	—	—		
41	Philip Grimmett		Ohariu-Belmont	—	—		
42	Kerry Hoole		Mount Albert	42	0		
43	Toni-Ann Alsop			63	+20		
44	D.J. Howard			—	—		
45	John Creser		Mana	—	—		
46	Maria McMillan			—	—		
47	Jane Hakaria			—	—		
48	Catherine Wilson			—	—		
49	Nokomis			—	—		
50	Dale Taylor			47	-3		
51	Wendy Clease			—	—		
52	Jeffrey Holdaway			—	—		
53	Tricesta Engebretsen			—	—		
54	Phillip Sandlant			—	—		
55	Robyn Holmes			—	—		
56	Ross Edgar		Rakaia	—	—		
57	Serena Moran			—	—		
58	Emma Smith			—	—		
59	Nikki Davis			—	—		
60	Andrew French			—	—		
61	David Sutcliffe			64	+3		
62	Daniel Mohr			—	—		
63	Michael Gemmel			—	—		
64	Samuel Cumming			—	—		
65	Karl Hewlett			—	—		

=== Mana Maori Movement ===
Rank	Name	Component Party	Incumbency	Contesting electorate	Previous rank	Change	Initial results	Later changes
1	Tame Iti	—		Auckland Central	2	+1		
2	Tuariki Delamere	Te Tawharau	Electorate	Waiariki	(NZ First: 18)	+16	✗ Lost seat	
3	Angeline Greensill	—		Port Waikato	1	-2		
4	Richard Kake	—			—	—		
5	Tunuiarangi McLean	Te Tawharau		Hauraki Maori	—	—		
6	Tracey Hancy	—			—	—		
7	Ken Mair	—		Te Tai Hauāuru	8	+1		
8	Anton Kerekere	Te Tawharau		East Coast	—	—		
9	Jesse Pene	—			—	—		
10	Mereana Pitman	—			5	-5		
11	David Edmonds	—			—	—		
12	Henare Morehu	—			—	—		
13	Te Miringa Hohaia	—			—	—		
14	Gareth Seymour	—		Hauraki Maori	—	—		
15	Hinemoa Kake	—			—	—		
16	Tania Rauna	—			—	—		
17	Ellen Amohanga	—			—	—		
18	Diane Prince	—			14	-4		
19	Anthony Moke	—			—	—		
20	Lai Toy	—		Karapiro	—	—		
21	Nigel Tairua	—			—	—		
22	Ngahapeaparatuae Lomax	—			—	—		
23	Julie Nathan	—			—	—		
24	Harata Jane Paul	—			—	—		
25	Tehurihanga Heihei	—			—	—		
26	Rangimarie Harding	—			—	—		
27	Wiremu Tairua	—			—	—		
28	Tiare Para	—			—	—		

=== Mauri Pacific ===
Rank	Name	Incumbency	Contesting electorate	Previous rank	Change	Initial results	Later changes
1	Tau Henare	Electorate	Te Tai Tokerau	(NZ First: 2)	+1	✗ Lost seat	
2	Tuku Morgan	Electorate	Te Tai Hauāuru	(NZ First: 10)	+8	✗ Lost seat	
3	Peta Si'ulepa		Titirangi	—	—		
4	Rana Waitai	Electorate	Ikaroa-Rāwhiti	(NZ First: 27)	+23	✗ Lost seat	
5	Ann Batten	List	Manurewa	(NZ First: 3)	-2	✗ Lost seat	
6	Te Orohi Paul		Waiariki	—	—		
7	Atawhai Tibble		Te Tai Tonga	—	—		
8	Amokura Huia Panoho		Hauraki Maori	—	—		
9	Rovina Anderson		Taupo	—	—		
10	Eric Chuah			(Advance NZ: 5)	-5		
11	Danny Turia		Manukau East	—	—		
12	Rajesh Masters		Taranaki-King Country	—	—		
13	Martin Kaipo		Whangarei	—	—		
14	Helen Akhtari		Hamilton East	—	—		
15	Trieste Te Awe Awe		Palmerston North	—	—		
16	Sharon Faloon		New Plymouth	—	—		
17	Rayna Waitai		Whanganui	—	—		
18	Fa'amatuainu Iakopo		Hamilton East	—	—		
19	Laura Mason			—	—		
20	Richard Waitai		Hutt South	—	—		
21	Kelly Waitai		Rangitikei	—	—		
22	Api Malu		Mana	—	—		

=== Natural Law Party ===
Rank	Name	Incumbency	Contesting electorate	Previous rank	Change	Initial results	Later changes
1	Bryan Lee		Rodney	1	0		
2	Ian Douglas		Wairarapa	—	—		
3	David Lovell-Smith		Banks Peninsula	2	-1		
4	Gillian Sanson			—	—		
5	John Cleary		Hamilton East	4	-1		
6	Graeme Lodge		Maungakiekie	20	+14		
7	Gray Treadwell			—	—		
8	Bruce Brown			18	+10		
9	Tony Martin		Palmerston North	10	+1		
10	Selwyn Austin		Hauraki Maori	42	+32		
11	Gail Pianta			7	-4		
12	John Hodgson			3	-9		
13	Linda Davy		Mount Roskill	—	—		
14	Mark Watts			8	-6		
15	Paul Moreham			—	—		
16	Raymond Cain		Epsom	31	+15		
17	Anthony Katavich			—	—		
18	John Bird			—	—		
19	Raylene Lodge		Hunua	35	+16		
20	Ian Smillie			55	+35		
21	Tim Irwin		Ikaroa-Rāwhiti	48	+27		
22	Linda Sinden		North Shore	—	—		
23	Michael Hirst		Rongotai	—	—		
24	Daniel Meares		Wellington Central	14	-10		
25	Warwick Jones		Christchurch East	11	-14		
26	Bruce Sowry		Ohariu-Belmont	29	+3		
27	Wayne Shepherd			49	+22		
28	Gary Benner			—	—		
29	Martin Jelley		Port Waikato	—	—		
30	Jonathan Muller		Hutt South	—	—		
31	Leslie McGrath			63	+32		
32	Tony Cornelissen		Northcote	—	—		
33	Russell Mack		Te Atatu	—	—		
34	Carolyn Drake		Wigram	34	0		
35	Thomas Hopwood			26	-9		
36	Andrew Sanderson		Pakuranga	28	-8		
37	Ian McCullough		Tukituki	—	—		
38	Kay Morgan		Titirangi	25	-13		
39	Martin Sharp		Rotorua	—	—		
40	Bobbie Aubertin			—	—		
41	Gilbert Urquhart			54	+13		
42	Mieke van Batenburg		Bay of Plenty	—	—		
43	Leigh Bush			57	+14		
44	Michael Bartelmeh			21	-23		
45	Faye McLaren			50	+5		
46	Grant Bilyard		Māngere	37	-9		
47	Garry van Leeuwen			—	—		
48	Brendan Rhodes		Ilam	—	—		
49	Anne Brigid		Kaikoura	58	+9		
50	Roy Neumegen			—	—		
51	Ruth Ordish-Benner			—	—		
52	Gary Barnard			—	—		
53	Lillian Urquhart			—	—		

=== NMP ===
Rank	Name	Incumbency	Contesting electorate	Previous rank	Change	Initial results	Later changes
1	Vivienne Berry-Evans		Tauranga	—	—		
2	George (Peter) Harrison		Waitakere	—	—		
3	Pauline Hallows		Northland	—	—		
4	Cecil Andrew de Latour			—	—		
5	Edwina Chmielowski			—	—		
6	Graham Mark Atkin		Ohariu-Belmont	—	—		
7	Llyn Renwick			—	—		
8	Darag Stuart Rennie		Albany	—	—		
9	Alison White		Otago	—	—		
10	Aaziq Mumtaz		Pakuranga	—	—		
11	Sue Johnston		Nelson	—	—		
12	Brett K Gifkins		Port Waikato	—	—		
13	Isabel Montgomery			—	—		
14	Peter Archer		Otaki	—	—		
15	Isabel Hutchinson			—	—		
16	Alfred James Mitchell			—	—		
17	David Pattinson		Mana	—	—		
18	John Sulu Tau Shepherd			—	—		
19	Anthony Phillip Cranston			—	—		

=== OneNZ Party ===
Rank	Name	Incumbency	Contesting electorate	Previous rank	Change	Initial results	Later changes
1	Walter Boyd		Otaki	—	—		

=== Republican Party ===
Rank	Name	Incumbency	Contesting electorate	Previous rank	Change	Initial results	Later changes
1	Gregory H Smith		Waitakere	—	—		
2	Brian Freeth		Maungakiekie	—	—		
3	Graham Gilfillan		Titirangi	—	—		
4	Jane Hotere		Mount Albert	—	—		
5	Sam Mendes		Tamaki	—	—		
6	Rose Hotere			—	—		
7	William Powell			—	—		

=== South Island Party ===
Rank	Name	Incumbency	Contesting electorate	Previous rank	Change	Initial results	Later changes
1	Alan McDonald		Dunedin North	—	—		
2	Patrick McCarrigan		Clutha-Southland	—	—		
3	Margaret McCarrigan		Dunedin South	—	—		
4	Miles Notman		Otago	—	—		
5	Gerry Campbell		Auckland Central	—	—		
6	Joe Price			—	—		
7	Paul Mierzejewski			—	—		

=== The People's Choice Party ===
Rank	Name	Incumbency	Contesting electorate	Previous rank	Change	Initial results	Later changes
1	Rusty Kane		New Plymouth	—	—		
2	Doug Wilson		Te Tai Hauāuru	—	—		

=== Te Tawharau ===
In the 1999 election, Te Tawharau stood in affiliation with the Mana Maori Movement, and three Te Tawharau candidates appeared on the Mana Maori Movement list. Te Tawharau therefore had no list of its own. However, the Mana Maori Movement section of this page identifies those candidates attached to Te Tawharau.
