= NZ South Island Party =

- Leader: Pat McCarrigan; Alan McDonald
- Headquarters: Dunedin
- Ideology: Regionalist
- International affiliation: Not Affiliated
- MPs in the House of Representatives: 0

The NZ South Island Party was a short-lived New Zealand regionalist political party, advocating greater representational say for the South Island. The party is no longer registered. Its aims were for the establishment of a regional assembly to handle issues relating directly to the South Island.

The party was founded in June 1997, standing for three main principles: adequate representation for South Island interests, a fair return of the South Island's share of the gross domestic product (GDP) and a measure of control over its natural resources. Spokesman Neville Bowie noted that Otago and Southland were responsible for 38.5% of GDP, and the whole South Island generated more than 50% of GDP with only 9% of New Zealand's population. He said "we've got to be realistic but we want a fair amount of that returned to us so we can give our youth some hope and self esteem." It was based in the Otago region, and led by Dunedin publican Pat McCarrigan with former trade unionist Alan McDonald as general secretary. Peter Dunne, MP for United Future, was not a member but agreed to ask questions on behalf of the party in Parliament.

The party attempted to use the slogan "Pride in the South" but brewing company Lion Nathan objected to this, saying it was too close to their slogan "Pride of the South".

By May 1998 the party had over 1,000 members including 40 North Islanders, with 13 active branches. The party was not effective in achieving a wide acclaim, poor organisation and lack of financial resources probably being to blame. In 1998 three former members based in Christchurch launched a separate political party called Majority Choice, citing concerns about policy differences. McDonald said he did not expect this to affect the growth of the South Island Party. In the 1999 elections, the party put forward five electorate candidates and seven list candidates.

The party won no seats in 1999. It received 0.14% of the party vote (2,912 votes in total), and its highest percentage of the party vote in any seat was 1.4%, in Clutha-Southland. Its best showing in any electorate was to receive 2.6% of the electorate vote (912 votes, by Margaret McCarrigan in Dunedin South). It had been estimated that it would have needed over 18% of the party vote of South Island residents in order to meet the 5% threshold to enter Parliament.

The party's registration was cancelled at its own request on 14 June 2002, and it did not contest the 2002 elections.

The South Island Independence movement is not a political party in its own right and may not be considered as being connected with the South Island Party, but its aims are generally regarded as being closely linked with those expressed by the South Island Party.
