= Freedom Movement (New Zealand) =

The Freedom Movement was a New Zealand political party. It was registered with the Electoral Commission for the 1999 election and provided a party list with 41 candidates. The party received 454 party votes, which represented 0.02% of the overall vote. It stood candidates in five electorates, and they received a combined 762 electorate votes, which represented 0.04% of the overall vote. Jennifer Waitai-Rapana, number 1 on the 1999 party list, is the great-granddaughter of T. W. Ratana (1873?–1939), the founder of the Rātana religion.
