= Piri Wiri Tua Movement =

Māori political party in New Zealand

Piri Wiri Tua Movement was a Māori political party in New Zealand associated with the Rātana movement. It was formed in 1999 with the aim of establishing a separate Māori assembly that would work in a partnership alongside Parliament to administer Māori affairs, social services, health and education and the Māori Land Court. The party's leader Te Kaiarahi Hui said the party's name referred to working closely with others to achieve benefits for Māori. He said Ratana had taken on the role of Piri Wiri Tua ('The Campaigner') when he worked to meet the needs of Māori people.

The party had six principles:

- the primacy of taha wairua (spirituality);
- upholding the Treaty of Waitangi and any subsequent treaty between the Crown and Māori;
- ensuring integrity, due process and justice for Māori in settlement of treaty claims;
- procuring Māori self-government (mana motuhake) through democratic processes;
- through mana motuhake, improving the social, cultural, educational, economic and environmental position of Māori.
- fostering peace, goodwill and understanding amongst all peoples in Aotearoa.

In the 1999 elections, the Piri Wiri Tua Movement fielded three candidates, who won 568 votes between them. One of the party's better known candidates was the entertainer Dalvanius Prime, who stood in the Te Tai Hauāuru electorate. Te Kaiarahi Hui was a candidate in Te Tai Tokerau electorate, and Erena Rigby stood in Te Tai Tonga electorate. In the 1999 and 2002 elections, the party was affiliated to the Mana Māori Movement.

The name "Piri Wiri Tua" was sometimes used by the Ratana religion's founder, Tahupotiki Wiremu Ratana, and means The Campaigner. A literal translation is Billy Bore Through or stick fast and bore to the other side. In 2002 the Ratana church successfully objected to the registration of the party, based on the fact that "Piri Wiri Tua" "...is used in a number of other ways by church followers...", and that "...would confuse and mislead voters into wrongly thinking the church had endorsed the party".
