= Bill Gudgeon =

New Zealand politician

Wiremu Mulligan "Bill" Gudgeon is a former New Zealand politician. He is a member of the New Zealand First party.

== Early years ==
Gudgeon is of Ngāti Porou descent and was raised on the East Coast and in the Waikato. He studied at the University of Waikato and the University of Hawaiʻi. Gudgeon served in the New Zealand Army, and was part of deployments in Malaya, Thailand and Borneo. He eventually became a lecturer at Waikato Polytechnic.

== Member of Parliament ==
New Zealand Parliament
Years	Term	Electorate	List	Party
2002–2005	47th	List	12	NZ First

Gudgeon stood in the 1999 election in the Ikaroa-Rāwhiti electorate. He was ranked 25th on New Zealand First's party list, which was too low to be elected. He was elected to Parliament as a list MP in the 2002 election, having been ranked twelfth on the New Zealand First list. He lost his list seat following a large decline in New Zealand First's vote in the 2005 election.
