= Donna Demente =

New Zealand artist

Donna Demente is a New Zealand artist. She is a 1987 graduate of the University of Auckland's Elam School of Fine Arts. She specialises in extreme close-up portraiture, with the emphasis on eyes, and also works with masks. Her style is heavily influenced by mediaeval art. She was a winner in the 1991 Nelson World of Wearable Art Awards.

Demente has been very heavily involved in the revival of the art scene in North Otago and is the organiser of Oamaru's annual mask festival. She currently resides in the North Otago town of Oamaru and exhibits much of her work in her "Grainstore Gallery" which is situated in Harbour Street, Oamaru's Historic Precinct.

In the 1999 election, Demente unsuccessfully stood as a list candidate for McGillicuddy Serious Party. She initially was to contest the Otago electorate as well, but withdrew owing to "fear of being sentenced to a term in Parliament".
