= Te Tawharau =

Te Tawharau (roughly translated as "the shelter") was a Māori political party in New Zealand.

Te Tawharau briefly had representation in Parliament when Tuariki Delamere, a former New Zealand First MP, transferred his loyalty to it. In the 1999 elections, Te Tawharau contested electorates under its own banner, but contested the party vote as part of the Mana Māori Movement. It did not, however, win any seats, with Delamere losing his position to Mita Ririnui of the Labour Party. Te Tawharau was founded by Delamere, the late Wharekaihua Coates, known as Willie Coates, and Rangitukehu David Paul. Te Tawharau was founded on the principles espoused by Te Haahi Ringatu (the Ringatu Church) and sought to persuade the Māori people to recognise that under the new MMP voting system it was possible for Māori to hold the balance of power if Māori was able to unite under a common umbrella.

The party contested the 1996 election with six list candidates.

In the 1999 election the Māori parties of Te Tawharau, Mana Māori and Piri Wiri Tua formed a political alliance to hold the balance of power. Te Tawharau did not put forward a party list and the 1999 alliance did not win any seats, the next step in that journey of Māori political awakening was reached in 2005 with the Māori Party winning four of the Māori electorates.

While Te Tawharau has not formally been absorbed into the new Māori Party, as Te Tawharau has lapsed as a political organisation, the elements and people behind Te Tawharau supported the Māori Party. In 2007, Te Tawharau requested and received deregistration.
