= NMP (political party) =

New Zealand political party

NMP was a political organisation in New Zealand in the late 1990s and early 2000s. It contested two general elections but won no seats.

== Formation, name and policies ==
The party was founded some time prior to October 1999, and became a registered political party in October 1999. According to the party's website, NMP stood for New Millennium Partnership (though was also presented as No More Politics, New Mandated People, No More Pollution, and New Management Policies). Policies listed on the website included the abolition of political parties and a review of bureaucracy, a redefinition of work and creation of co-operatives, environmental policies to move towards ecological balance, and a tax overhaul and elimination of overseas debt.

== 1999 election ==
NMP contested the 1999 general election. It received 935 party votes (0.05% of the total).

== 2002 election ==
NMP also contested the 2002 general election. Election records show that it spent $242 in expenses for this election. It received 274 votes (0.01% of the total), the lowest result of all parties in the election.

== Disestablishment ==
On 14 March 2003, the party was officially removed from the register of parties at its own request.
