= Mana Wahine Te Ira Tangata =

Defunct Maori political party

Mana Wahine Te Ira Tangata was a small and short-lived political party in New Zealand. It was established by Alamein Kopu, a member of the New Zealand Parliament who had left her original party (the Alliance). After a short time as an independent MP, Kopu established Mana Wahine as her own party. It was officially registered on 12 June 1998.

The name "Mana Wahine Te Ira Tangata" is difficult to translate, but essentially refers to dignity or respect for women. Kopu claims that the party was intended to support Māori women, promoting a Māori form of feminism. Critics of Alamein Kopu, however, did not see the party as a genuine ideological organization. Rather, they saw a more cynical reason for the party's creation – as leader of a party rather than an independent, Kopu was entitled to $80,000 in additional funding. Jim Anderton, leader of Kopu's former party, said that the creation of Mana Wahine smelled of corruption, a sentiment which was echoed by several other politicians.

Kopu (and thus Mana Wahine) closely followed the National Party government of Jenny Shipley. National, having recently ended its coalition with the New Zealand First party, was highly interested in finding additional parliamentary support. It is sometimes claimed that National's influence was instrumental in gaining Mana Wahine official recognition as a party, and many members of the Opposition claimed that National offered this help in return for Mana Wahine's vote – Trevor Mallard, a Labour Party MP, openly called it a "bribe".

Mana Wahine contested only two elections. The first was the Taranaki-King Country by-election in 1998. The Mana Wahine candidate, Mary Gilmore, received 7 of the 20,225 valid votes. In the 1999 general election, Mana Wahine failed to submit a party list, with Kopu saying that she missed the deadline by just minutes. The party nevertheless contested twelve electorate seats, gaining a total of 1,082 votes across the country, which would have been nowhere near enough to qualify for MMP in any event. None of the party's candidates came anywhere close to being elected; Kopu herself contested the Waiariki electorate, and gained sixth place with 1.70% of the vote.

On 12 February 2001, Mana Wahine was removed from the list of registered political parties at its own request.
