= Mana motuhake =

Concept in Māori thought

Mana motuhake is a phrase in the Māori language that means self determination, with the principle being autonomy and control. It is sometimes translated to the concept of sovereignty.

There was a New Zealand political party called Mana Motuhake that was registered from 1980–2005, and the Māori Party have a policy called the Mana Motuhake that was announced in 2020.

== Definitions ==
Legal scholar Carwyn Jones asserts that ‘mana is the central concept that underlies Māori leadership and accountability’. Mana is described by Māori Marsden as ‘spiritual power and authority as opposed to the purely psychic and natural force—ihi’.

According to the New Zealand Ministry of Justice:

Mana and tapu are concepts which have both been attributed single-worded definitions by contemporary writers. As concepts, especially Maori concepts they can not easily be translated into a single English definition. Both mana and tapu take on a whole range of related meanings depending on their association and the context in which they are being used.

Hemopereki Simon asserts that, "There are many types of mana." If mana in this case is deemed authority and power, then the term ‘motuhake’ is understood as ‘separated, special, distinct, independent, unattached.’ It is therefore understood to be:

Autonomous or independent power that is factual and held by either hapu or iwi, similar to sovereignty but grounded in the whakapapa connection of mana whenua to their ancestor Papatūānuku and their legal system of tikanga. It is an obligation and responsibility of every generation to protect, safeguard and ensure it continues intact.

== Mana motuhake and Treaty of Waitangi ==
=== Treaty of Waitangi ===
The Treaty of Waitangi was first signed on 6 February 1840 by representatives of the British Crown and Māori chiefs (rangatira) from the North Island of New Zealand. It is a document of central importance to the history and political constitution of the state of New Zealand, and has been highly significant in framing the political relations between New Zealand's government and the Māori population.

The differences between the two versions of the text have made it difficult to interpret the Treaty and continue to undermine its effect. The most critical difference between the texts revolves around the interpretation of three Māori words: kāwanatanga (governorship), which is ceded to the Queen in the first article; rangatiratanga (chieftainship) not mana (leadership) (which was stated in the Declaration of Independence just five years before the treaty was signed), which is retained by the chiefs in the second; and taonga (property or valued possessions), which the chiefs are guaranteed ownership and control of, also in the second article. Few Māori involved with the Treaty negotiations understood the concepts of sovereignty or "governorship", as they were used by 19th-century Europeans, and lawyer Moana Jackson has stated that "ceding mana or sovereignty in a treaty was legally and culturally incomprehensible in Māori terms".

Hemopereki Simon ascertains that mana motuhake is a more accurate term than kāwanatanga based on a Maori philosophy point of view and the assertions of Ngati Tuwharetoa. According to Taiarahia Black, Te Kooti Arikirangi understood mana motuhake as the third mana and used the term 'mana motuhake' in a political sense as the equivalent of sovereignty. The word kāwanatanga is a loan translation from 'governorship' and was not part of the Māori language. The term had been used by Henry Williams in his translation of the Declaration of the Independence of New Zealand which was signed by 35 northern Māori chiefs at Waitangi on 28 October 1835. The Declaration of Independence of New Zealand states "Ko te Kīngitanga ko te mana i te w[h]enua" to describe "all sovereign power and authority in the land". There is debate about what would have been a more appropriate term. Some scholars, notably Ruth Ross, argue that mana (prestige, authority) would have more accurately conveyed the transfer of sovereignty. However, it has more recently been argued by others, including Judith Binney, that mana would not have been appropriate. This is because mana is not the same thing as sovereignty, and also because no-one can give up their mana. This academic debate centres around mana in the form of mana motuhake.

=== Waitangi Tribunal's Te Paparahi o te Raki inquiry ===
The Waitangi Tribunal, in Te Paparahi o te Raki inquiry (Wai 1040) is in the process of considering the Māori and Crown understandings of He Whakaputanga o te Rangatiratanga / The Declaration of Independence 1835 and Te Tiriti o Waitangi / the Treaty of Waitangi 1840. This aspect of the inquiry raises issues as to the nature of sovereignty and whether the Māori signatories to the Treaty of Waitangi intended to transfer sovereignty.

The first stage of the report was released in November 2014, and found that Māori chiefs in Northland never agreed to give up their sovereignty when they signed the Treaty of Waitangi in 1840. Although the Crown intended to negotiate the transfer of sovereignty through the Treaty, the chiefs' understanding of the agreement was they were only ceding the power for the Crown to control Pākehā and protect Māori. Tribunal manager Julie Tangaere said at the report's release to the Ngapuhi claimants:

Your tupuna [ancestors] did not give away their mana at Waitangi, at Waimate, at Mangungu. They did not cede their sovereignty. This is the truth you have been waiting a long time to hear.

In terms of mana motuhake He Whakaputanga, creating a Māori state and government in 1835 and/or Te Tiriti o Waitangi, and those who did not sign anything, thus maintaining mana motuhake. In relation to the former, a summary report (entitled ‘Ngāpuhi Speaks’) of evidence presented to the Waitangi Tribunal argues that:

1. Ngāpuhi did not cede their sovereignty.
2. The Crown had recognised He Whakaputanga as a proclamation by the rangatira of their sovereignty over this country.
3. The treaty entered into by the rangatira and the Crown — Te Tiriti o Waitangi — followed on from He Whakaputanga, establishing the role of the British Crown with respect to Pākehā.
4. The treaty delegated to Queen Victoria's governor the authority to exercise control over hitherto lawless Pākehā people in areas of hapū land allocated to the Queen.
5. The Crown's English language document, referred to as the Treaty of Waitangi, was neither seen nor agreed to by Ngāpuhi and instead reflects the hidden wishes of British imperial power.

More recently, Ned Fletcher has argued, based on an analysis of the global British historical context, that the English language document has been misunderstood. In fact, he says, when the proper historical context is understood, the intent of the British is best understood to be aligned closely to the plain text of the Māori document, that is, the purpose of the treaty was to exercise control over British settlers and not to diminish Māori social structures or authority over their own people and lands. In contrast to earlier writing, in this view, there was no misunderstanding in translation of the Māori document because the intention by the British was more or less what the Māori understood at the time.

=== Non-signatory iwi and hapu ===
Ngāti Tūwharetoa academic Hemopereki Simon outlined a case in 2017, using Ngāti Tūwharetoa as a case study, for how hapu and iwi that did not sign the Treaty still maintain mana motuhake and how the sovereignty of the Crown could be considered questionable. This work was builds on the Te Paparahi o te Raki inquiry (Wai 1040) decision by the Waitangi Tribunal.
