= Alamein Kopu =

New Zealand politician

Member of the New Zealand Parliament for Alliance, then Mana Wahine list
- In office 12 October 1996 – 27 November 1999

Personal details
- Born: 1943
- Died: 4 December 2011 (aged 68) Rotorua, New Zealand
- Party: Alliance (1991-1997); Mana Wahine (1997-2001)
- Children: Six
- Occupation: Community worker

Manu Alamein Kopu (1943 – 4 December 2011) was a New Zealand politician.

== Biography ==
=== Early life and career ===
Kopu was raised in Ōpōtiki, Kopu was the seventh in a family of twenty children. Her family was not wealthy, and Kopu characterised her youth as containing "much hardship". In 1978, her family moved to Sydney, Australia.

In Australia, Kopu worked in community programmes aimed at drug addicts and prostitutes at a crisis centre in Kings Cross, New South Wales. She continued this line of work after arriving back in New Zealand in 1986, working with Betty Wark at the Aroha Society. Kopu also had considerable involvement in rehabilitation programmes for criminals acting as house parents for long term prison inmates after their release.

=== Political career ===
New Zealand Parliament
Years	Term	Electorate	List	Party
1996–1997	45th	List	12	Alliance
1997	Changed allegiance to:			Independent
1997–1999	Changed allegiance to:			Mana Wahine

In addition to her rehabilitation work, Kopu was also involved in various Māori cultural and educational programs. She quickly joined Mana Motuhake, a political party based around promoting Māori interests and welfare. When Mana Motuhake joined with several other groups to establish the Alliance, Kopu became involved in the new organisation. In the 1993 election, she stood as its candidate in Eastern Maori, but was unsuccessful. In the 1996 election, the first to be conducted under the new MMP system, Kopu contested the Te Tai Rawhiti seat, essentially a reconfigured Eastern Maori. She was also ranked twelfth on the Alliance list. While she did not win Te Tai Rawhiti, the Alliance received enough votes for Kopu to enter parliament as a list MP. In parliament she was an Alliance spokesperson on Māori affairs, women and youth.

Kopu gradually came under increasing criticism. She had been unemployed for nearly two decades prior to her lucrative election as an MP. She was also seen as having been elected in a 'backdoor' manner; Mana Mohutake leader Sandra Lee had threatened to resign if the Alliance did not include Kopu in a high place on the party list. This was compounded by her apparent lack of participation – many Alliance colleagues complained that she was rarely seen in Parliament, and believed that she was not doing sufficient work. She claimed her disengagement was a perception that she was being left out of Alliance decision making. Other causes of criticism stemmed from internal tensions between different factions of Mana Motuhake. Kopu resented the criticism, and voiced the possibility of leaving the Alliance. Party leader Jim Anderton and party president Matt McCarten sought a meeting to address Kopu's concerns, wishing her to remain in the party, but just before the scheduled meeting with them Kopu gave an interview on Māori News stating she was leaving the Alliance to form her own party.

In July 1997, Kopu finally resigned from the Alliance. In a televised statement, she refused to speak English, but only spoke te reo Māori. She blamed racist discrimination for her predicament, going as far as stating that "apartheid is alive and well in New Zealand". When parliamentary services entered her electorate office it was missing furniture earlier allocated to her. The police carried out an investigation and recovered the missing material. No charges were laid against Kopu.

The issue was also of particular relevance since had been elected to parliament by virtue of her position on the Alliance list, not through any votes she had received personally. As such, many believed that Kopu had no right to remain in parliament. Moreover, Kopu (like all other Alliance MPs) had previously signed a pledge affirming that if she ever left the party, she would resign from parliament. Kopu had, in fact, reaffirmed this pledge only a few days before she quit. The leader of the Alliance, Anderton, said that Kopu's actions "breach[ed] every standard of morality and ethics that are known".

Kopu defended her decision by saying that she was only doing what was best for Māori. Upon leaving the Alliance, she also received strong support from several other Māori MPs, notably Tau Henare of the New Zealand First party. Henare, who had often criticised the Alliance's (and Mana Motuhake's) approach to Māori affairs, said that Kopu was welcome to join New Zealand First, although this was later rejected by other members of the party. Kopu quickly aligned herself with the governing coalition.

A hearing of parliament's privileges committee found that Kopu had not resigned from parliament, and that her pledge to the Alliance did not constitute a constructive resignation. The dispute ultimately led to the introduction of the Electoral Integrity Act (2001), which – for four years – prevented what became known as waka jumping.

==== Mana Wahine ====
After spending some time as an independent, Kopu decided to establish her own political party, Mana Wahine Te Ira Tangata. When she launched the party in October 1997, Kopu claimed to have 6,000 members. The party was ostensibly based on promoting the welfare of Māori women. Many of Kopu's critics, however, claimed that the party was established primarily to ensure Kopu received more generous parliamentary funding. As a party leader rather than an independent, Kopu was eligible for an additional $80,000 in funding. Mana Wahine became significant when, in 1999, the governing National Party was with a precarious majority when its coalition with New Zealand First collapsed. National needed as much support as it could find, and managed to obtain Kopu's backing along with that of several former New Zealand First MPs.

In the 1999 election, Kopu stood as her party's candidate in the Waiariki electorate. Eleven other Mana Wahine candidates also stood. The party had also intended to submit a party list, but Kopu failed to submit it before the deadline – stating herself that she missed the deadline by mere minutes. This eliminated the possibility of Kopu remaining in parliament as a list MP – she would need to win her electorate race in order to remain in parliament. In the election, however, Kopu won only 1.7% of the vote in Waiariki, placing sixth. Moreover, Mana Wahine candidates only won 1,082 votes nationwide, nowhere near enough for Kopu to be returned as a list MP in any case. Following this loss, she left politics permanently, and the party was dissolved in 2001.

== Personal life ==
Kopu was married with six children and (as of 1996) thirteen grandchildren. Her husband had been long term unemployed since 1990.

=== Death ===
Kopu died in Rotorua on 4 December 2011.
