= Mana Māori Movement =

New Zealand political party

The Mana Māori Movement was a New Zealand political party. It advocated on behalf of the Māori people. It was founded by Eva Rickard, a Māori activist. Rickard was originally a member of Mana Motuhake, another Māori party, but quit when Mana Motuhake joined the Alliance (a broad left-wing coalition). Rickard, believing that an independent Māori party was needed, founded Mana Māori in 1993.

The party contested the 1996 election with 18 list candidates, and got 4070 votes (0.20%).

Rickard's daughter, Angeline Greensill later took over co-leadership of the Mana Māori Movement, the largest wholly Māori party contesting the 2002 New Zealand general election, and incorporated the smaller Te Tawharau and Piri Wiri Tua parties, but did not win any seats. The party received only 4,980 votes (0.25%) in 2002. The emergence of the new Māori Party, founded by sitting MP Tariana Turia, prompted the transfer of support from Mana Māori, and Greensill agreed to temporarily recess the party which was officially deregistered in 2005.

Greensill stood twice for the Māori Party before later joining the breakaway Mana Movement.
