= Auckland Central in the 2020 New Zealand general election =

- Turnout: Candidate vote: 35,985 (57.19%); Party vote: 36,403 (57.85%)
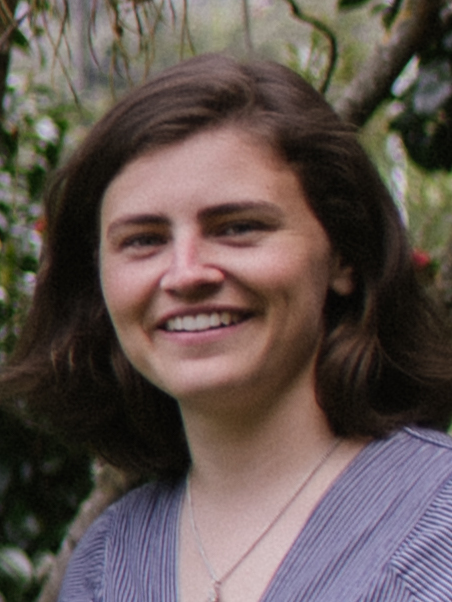

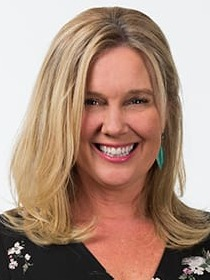
| | | | NAT |
| Candidate | Chlöe Swarbrick | Helen White | Emma Mellow |
| Party | Green | Labour | National |
| Popular vote | 12,631 | 11,563 | 9,775 |
| Percentage | 35.10% | 32.13% | 27.16% |
| Party vote | 6,937 | 16,751 | 7,680 |
| Percentage | 19.06% | 46.02% | 21.10% |
- Margin of victory by suburb / locality
MP before election
Nikki Kaye
National
Elected MP
Chlöe Swarbrick
Green

An election took place in the Auckland Central general electorate on 17 October 2020 as part of the 2020 New Zealand general election. After incumbent MP, Nikki Kaye, declared she would not run for re-election, three main candidates emerged as potential victors; Labour candidate and employment lawyer Helen White, National candidate and communications manager Emma Mellow, and incumbent Green list MP Chlöe Swarbrick.

Two polls conducted before the election showed White ahead, with Mellow and Swarbrick coming second and third, respectively. The closeness in the polls between the three candidates lead to concerns of vote splitting on the left between White and Swarbrick, which might have led to a Mellow victory. In a surprising result, Swarbrick won with 35% of the vote, with White on 32% coming second, and Mellow on 27% coming third. The result was the second time the Greens had won an electorate, and the first time they had done so without the endorsement of a major party.

== Background ==
Kaye, who was briefly serving as deputy leader of the National Party, announced she would not seek re-election after Todd Muller stepped down from the party leadership. The 2017 election saw Kaye go up against Labour candidate Helen White, defeating White narrowly, with a margin of +5.38%. White was re-selected as the Labour candidate for 2020. White, who grew up in Freemans Bay (a suburb within the electorate), was ranked 40th on the Labour list in 2017.

National Party candidate selection narrowed to two, Emma Mellow and Nuwanthie Samarakone. This broke the party's rules for shortlisting candidates, as the pre-selection committee was supposed to select five candidates for local party delegates to vote on. Party president Peter Goodfellow "absolutely and categorically" rejected that the process was manipulated. A photo of Samarakone in a leotard was reported as being passed around party members; Samarakone said she had "no tolerance" for personal attacks. Mellow was selected in a ballot in which Samarakone and another candidate, Rob Thomas, were eliminated. National Party northern regional chair Andre Hunt "bluntly" criticised party members at the meeting for the "outrageous lies" that were spread about Samarakone. The 30-year-old Mellow was a communications manager at ANZ and described herself as a "young liberal female", the same public image that Kaye had successfully used to win the urban electorate.

The Green Party selected Chlöe Swarbrick as their candidate. Swarbrick had been elected as a Green list MP at the 2017 election. She ran an unexpectedly successful campaign in the 2016 Auckland mayoral election, coming third with 7.33% of the vote. In November 2019, before she had been officially selected, political commentator Ben Thomas said a victory for her was "very unlikely". Swarbrick herself said the race was "anyone's game". Swarbrick had previously run in Maungakiekie, though then she was not running a "two-tick" campaign and was focusing on boosting the party vote. The Opportunities Party initially selected Joshua Love as their candidate, but after he resigned, Tuariki Delamere, former Minister of Immigration during the Fourth National Government, joined the party as their immigration spokesperson and contested the Auckland Central race.

== Candidates ==
=== Declared ===
- Dominic Hoffman Dervan, TEA Party candidate.
- Tuariki Delamere, The Opportunities Party (TOP) candidate – former New Zealand First MP, Minister of Immigration during the Fourth National Government.
- Joshua Love, initially the candidate for TOP, he resigned from the party and stood as an independent.
- Jenny Marcroft, incumbent New Zealand First list MP – she was moved down to number 17 on the party list which would make her return to parliament unlikely.
- Emma Mellow, National candidate – communications manager at ANZ.
- Felix Poole, ACT candidate – incumbent president of Young ACT.
- Chris Sadler, independent.
- Kevin Stitt, New Conservatives Party candidate.
- Chlöe Swarbrick, incumbent Green list MP – had previously run for mayor.
- Vernon Tava, leader of the Sustainable New Zealand Party – former Green candidate elsewhere.
- Helen White, Labour candidate and employment lawyer – was the main challenger against Kaye in the previous election.

=== Declined ===
- Nikki Kaye, incumbent National MP for Auckland Central – announced she would resign and not contest the election.

== Campaign ==
White had a background as an employment lawyer, citing her 27 years experience in the field as evidence of her ability to solve people's problems. She said that key issues for her were "good public transport, tackling homelessness and maintaining a strong health care system", and pointed to her close relationship with Jacinda Ardern, the popular (Note: See polling on preferred prime minister here.) incumbent Prime Minister, as an advantage she brought to the electorate. White described herself as "pragmatic". White said the three biggest issues in the electorate were affordability, housing, and making the city more walkable, cyclable and public-transit oriented. White's campaign also went after the Green Party's proposed wealth tax, hoping that wealthier voters would be put off by it. She described the policy as "loopy".

There were concerns of vote-splitting amongst the left-wing electorate, with both Labour and the Greens having popular candidates. White frequently pushed this message in hopes it would consolidate the vote around her as Labour is the major party on the left. White called Swarbrick a "celebrity", and positioned Mellow as her main opponent. Swarbrick said that White was using similar tactics to misogynists that had attacked Ardern, referring to comments from White that "[She would] ask [constituents] whether they're looking for a celebrity or someone to do this job very seriously."

The suggestion that Labour do a deal with the Green Party similar to the deal between National and ACT in Epsom was ruled out by Ardern and White. White said recapturing Auckland Central meant a lot to Labour.

A fundraiser in early October for White featured former Labour Prime Minister Helen Clark, and Jennifer Ward-Lealand (2020 New Zealander of the Year) as master of ceremonies. The former prime minister spoke positively of White and expressed to attendees that she would be a voice for Auckland within Labour. Swarbrick had a campaign event on the same night nearby, a drag show with drag queen Anita Wigl'it as host.

Mellow said that her generation, and the electorate generally, cared deeply about jobs and the future of the city including employment and infrastructure. She described the three biggest issues facing the electorate as jobs, investment in infrastructure (including a second harbour crossing), and the environment, specifically the Hauraki Gulf's water quality. When asked why she thought she was the best candidate Mellow pointed to her commercial experience and that she was "hard-working".

According to Swarbrick, some main issues were homelessness (especially among young people), and protecting the Hauraki Gulf. Swarbrick pointed to her track record as a Green MP in dealing with nuanced and complex issues. Swarbrick also said that as a member of a minor party she would have a more independent voice. Swarbrick's campaign manager was 25-year-old Leroy Beckett, who had previously helped Phil Goff's mayoral re-election campaign in 2019.

With the Greens often polling below the 5% minimum threshold, a win in the electorate was seen as a way to secure the continued presence of the party in parliament by some. The party was also running a "two-tick" campaign in Tāmaki Makaurau, with Marama Davidson standing in Auckland's urban Māori electorate.

== Polling ==
Polls during the race showed White ahead with Mellow in second; Swarbrick was a close third.

Electorate vote
| Date (Note: These are the survey dates of the poll, or if the survey dates are not stated, the date the poll was released.) | Polling organisation | LAB | NAT | | GRN | | NZF | | TOP | | ACT | | SNZ | TEA | IND |
| Date | Polling organisation | Helen White | Emma Mellow | Nikki Kaye | Chlöe Swarbrick | Denise Roche | Jenny Marcroft | Frank Edwards | Tuariki Delamere | Mika Haka | Felix Poole | Brooke van Velden | Vernon Tava | Dominic Hoffman Dervan | Joshua Love |
|---|---|---|---|---|---|---|---|---|---|---|---|---|---|---|---|
| 24–30 Sep 2020 | Q+A Colmar Brunton | 35 | 30 | N/A | 26 | N/A | 1 | N/A | — | N/A | 4 | N/A | 2 | 1 | 0.4 |
| September 2020 | Newshub Nation–Reid Research | 42.3 | 26.6 | N/A | 24.2 | N/A | 2.2 | N/A | 1.0 | N/A | 0.9 | N/A | — | — | — |
| 23 Sep 2017 | 2017 election result | 39.82 | N/A | 45.25 | N/A | 9.72 | N/A | 1.98 | N/A | 2.33 | N/A | 0.52 | N/A | N/A | N/A |

Party vote
| Date | Polling organisation | LAB | NAT | GRN | ACT | NZF | TOP | SNZ | VNZ | SCP |
|---|---|---|---|---|---|---|---|---|---|---|
| 24–30 Sep 2020 | Q+A Colmar Brunton | 47 | 28 | 13 | 6 | 1.7 | 2.2 | 0.6 | 0.4 | 0.3 |
| September 2020 | Newshub Nation–Reid Research | 56.2 | 23.1 | 12.1 | 3.9 | 1.6 | 1.4 | — | — | — |
| 23 Sep 2017 | 2017 election result | 37.71 | 39.15 | 13.87 | 1.05 | 3.87 | 3.14 | N/A | N/A | 0.01 |

== Results ==
In a result that was described as extraordinary and as a major election night upset, Swarbrick clinched the election with 35.10% of the vote, defeating second place White by a margin of just +2.97%; Mellow came third. The win was the Green Party's second-ever electorate win, and unlike the party's previous win with Jeanette Fitzsimons in Coromandel in 1999, they had done so without an endorsement from a major party. Swarbrick attributed her success to a strong volunteer campaign; according to her they had "1000 volunteers" and had spoken to "10,000 constituents". Brigette Morten for RNZ said it was "rumoured to [be] 700 volunteers". Green co-leader Marama Davidson said she was "beyond thrilled". Chloe opined that she was confident her "two-tick" campaign had helped to increase the Green party vote.

Predictions of vote-splitting among left wing candidates did not come to fruition, with both Swarbrick and White achieving more votes than Mellow.

2020 general election: Auckland Central
| Notes: | Blue background denotes the winner of the electorate vote. Pink background denotes a candidate elected from their party list. Yellow background denotes an electorate win by a list member, or other incumbent. A ✓ or ✗ denotes status of any incumbent, win or lose respectively. | | | | | | |
| Party | Candidate | Votes | % | ±% | Party votes | % | ±% |
|---|---|---|---|---|---|---|---|
| Green | Chlöe Swarbrick | 12,631 | 35.10 | +25.38 | 6,937 | 19.06 | +5.19 |
| Labour | Helen White | 11,563 | 32.13 | −7.68 | 16,751 | 46.02 | +8.31 |
| National | Emma Mellow | 9,775 | 27.16 | −18.08 | 7,680 | 21.10 | −18.05 |
| ACT | Felix Poole | 588 | 1.63 | +1.11 | 2,724 | 7.48 | +6.43 |
| Opportunities | Tuariki Delamere | 320 | 0.89 | −1.44 | 776 | 2.13 | −1.01 |
| NZ First | Jenny Marcroft | 274 | 0.76 | −1.22 | 622 | 1.71 | −2.16 |
| New Conservative | Kevin Stitt | 186 | 0.51 | +0.33 | 197 | 0.54 | +0.44 |
| Sustainable NZ | Vernon Tava | 120 | 0.33 | — | 59 | 0.16 | — |
| Independent | Joshua Love | 73 | 0.20 | — | | | |
| TEA | Dominic Hoffman Dervan | 50 | 0.14 | — | 35 | 0.10 | — |
| Independent | Chris Sadler | 23 | 0.06 | — | | | |
| Advance NZ | | | | | 198 | 0.53 | — |
| Māori Party | | | | | 111 | 0.30 | −0.11 |
| Legalise Cannabis | | | | | 99 | 0.27 | +0.03 |
| ONE | | | | | 20 | 0.05 | — |
| Outdoors | | | | | 15 | 0.04 | +0.01 |
| Vision NZ | | | | | 11 | 0.03 | — |
| Social Credit | | | | | 7 | 0.02 | +0.01 |
| Heartland | | | | | 1 | 0.00 | — |
| Informal votes | | 382 | | | 160 | | |
| Total valid votes | | 35,985 | | | 36,403 | | |
| Turnout | | 36,625 | 83.95 | +4.01 | | | |
| Green gain from National | Majority | 1,068 | 2.97 | –2.24 | | | |

== Aftermath ==
The Greens formed a co-operation agreement with Labour who had secured the first majority government since the introduction of MMP. Swarbrick was the only Green electorate MP for the term of the 53rd Parliament. She would contest the electorate again at the 2023 election, successfully securing re-election. She was joined by two other Green electorate MPs, Tamatha Paul in Wellington Central and Julie Anne Genter in Rongotai. Swarbrick would go on to become a co-leader of the Green Party in March 2024, after James Shaw resigned the position. White served as a list MP for the term of the 53rd Parliament before winning Ardern's former seat of Mount Albert in 2023.
