= Helen White (politician) =

New Zealand politician

Helen White MP
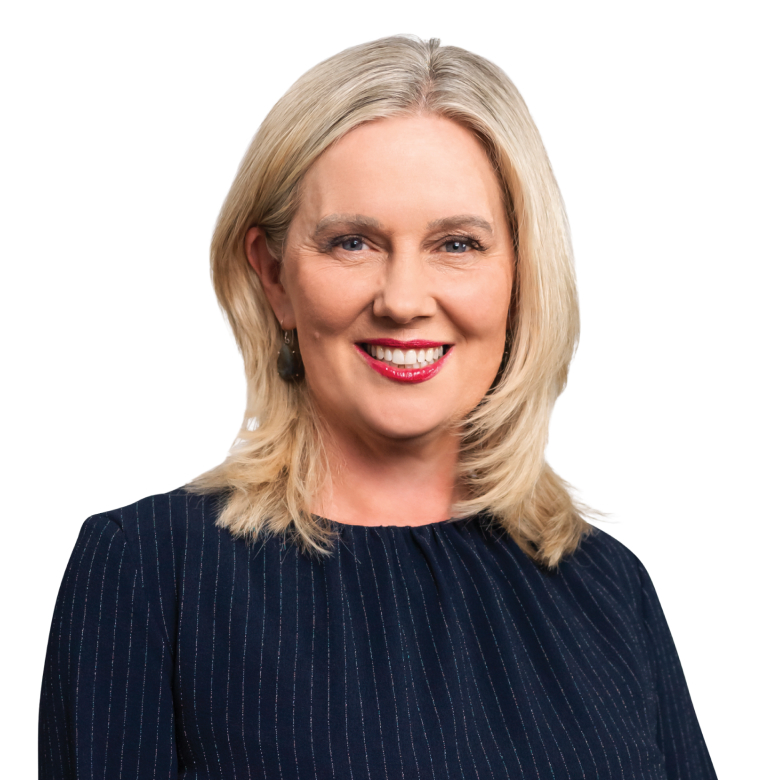
- White in 2023

Member of the New Zealand Parliament for Mount Albert
- Incumbent
- Assumed office 14 October 2023
- Preceded by: Jacinda Ardern
- Majority: 18

Member of the New Zealand Parliament for Labour party list
- In office 17 October 2020 – 14 October 2023

Personal details
- Born: 1967 or 1968 (age 57–58)
- Party: Labour
- Children: 3
- Profession: Lawyer
- Website: www.labour.org.nz/our-team/helen-white/

Helen Ione White (born 1967 or 1968) is a New Zealand politician. In 2020 she became a Member of Parliament in the House of Representatives for the Labour Party. In 2023, she was chosen by Labour to contest the Mount Albert electorate, previously held by former Prime Minister Jacinda Ardern. White won the seat, holding it for Labour, but by a significantly reduced margin of 18 votes.

== Early life and career ==
White and her family originally lived in Kawerau before moving to Auckland in 1971, attending a school that was 98% Pasifika. She grew up in Freemans Bay, Auckland and became a barrister, specialising in employment law. She lives in Auckland and has three children.

Early in her legal career, White worked with the Engineering, Printing and Manufacturing Union for a period alongside future Labour leader Andrew Little.

== Political career ==
New Zealand Parliament
Years	Term	Electorate	List	Party
2020–2023	53rd	List	48	Labour
2023–2026	54th	Mount Albert	47	Labour
2026–present	55th	Mount Albert	37	Labour

In 2009 White attempted to gain the Labour nomination in the Mount Albert by-election to replace former Prime Minister Helen Clark, but lost to David Shearer. Eight years later in February 2017, White won the Labour Party nomination to stand in Auckland Central at the general election in 2017, winning preference over other contestant Shanan Halbert. White was ranked 40 on Labour's party list.

=== First term, 2020–2023 ===
Despite not being elected to parliament in 2017, White was selected to stand in Auckland Central again in 2020. White received some criticism after mocking her electorate opponent, the Green Party's Chlöe Swarbrick, as a celebrity candidate and describing herself as the serious candidate, despite the fact that Swarbrick held a seat in Parliament (as a List MP) while White did not. A Newshub poll conducted in September 2020 had White with a large lead over her main competitors 42.3 to 26.6 for National's Emma Mellow and 24.2 for Swarbrick. By October the race had tightened. White remained in the lead but dropped to 35 percent to Mellow's 30 and Swarbrick's 26. White did not win the Auckland Central seat, losing to Swarbrick by 1068 votes, but was allocated a seat in Parliament via Labour's party list.

In her first term as an MP, White was a member of the Finance and Expenditure Committee, the Regulations Review Committee, and the Transport and Infrastructure Committee.

In February 2023, Labour leader and prime minister Jacinda Ardern announced she would leave Parliament, and in March 2023 the Labour Party selected White as its replacement candidate for the Mount Albert electorate in the 2023 New Zealand general election.

=== Second term, 2023–2026 ===
In October 2023, White held the electorate for Labour, but by a reduced margin of 20 votes following the release on final results on 3 November. In 2020, Ardern had won the electorate by more than 21,000 votes. After the National Party's candidate Melissa Lee sought a judicial recount, White's margin dropped to 18 votes.

In late November 2023, White was appointed as spokesperson for community and voluntary sector, small business and manufacturing, and associate justice in the Shadow Cabinet of Chris Hipkins.

Following a shadow cabinet reshuffle in early March 2025, White retained the community and voluntary sector portfolio and gained the "prevention of family and sexual violence" portfolio. She lost the small business and manufacturing and associate justice portfolios.

=== Third term, 2026–present ===
During the 2026 New Zealand general election, White contested the Mount Albert electorate for Labour. She was ranked 37th on the Labour Party list. During the election held on 7 November, White retained Mt Albert by a margin of 4,678 votes based on preliminary results, defeating National's candidate Melissa Lee.
