= 2024 Green Party of Aotearoa New Zealand co-leadership election =

- February–March 2024

171 delegates 86 needed to win
Candidate	Chlöe Swarbrick
Leader's seat	Auckland Central
Delegate vote	169
Percentage	98.83%
Co-leaders before election
Marama Davidson
James Shaw
Co-leaders after election
Marama Davidson
Chlöe Swarbrick

The Green Party of Aotearoa New Zealand held an election for the position of co-leader of the party in March 2024, following the resignation of James Shaw. Incumbent MP Chlöe Swarbrick and Dunedin-based activist Alex Foulkes were the only two candidates.

Swarbrick was elected almost unanimously, receiving 169 votes out of the total 171; Foulkes received no votes.

== Background ==
James Shaw was elected as co-leader of the Greens in 2015, initially serving alongside Metiria Turei until her resignation in 2017. This lead him to serve as sole co-leader during the 2017 general election period, following which the party ended up in government through a confidence and supply agreement with the Labour Party; Shaw would serve as Minister of Climate Change as part of that agreement. He would be joined soon after by Marama Davidson as co-leader. That co-leadership team lead the party in the 2020 and 2023 general elections. Following the latter, Shaw announced his intention to resign as co-leader. He said he felt his time in parliament was done, following the ousting of the Labour government the party had supported.

== Electoral process ==
Nominations for the election opened on 31 January and closed on 14 February 2024. Party members hold local meetings that decide how each branch will vote, with each branch getting a number of votes proportional to the number of members who live in the electorate they represent.

=== Candidate requirements ===
Prior to May 2022, it had been required by the party's constitution that one co-leader of the party be male and one be female; this was changed such that now it was only required that one co-leader be female. There was also the additional requirement added that one co-leader be Māori. As Marama Davidson (the other incumbent co-leader) fulfilled both requirements, any member of the party was able to run for the position in this election. Co-leaders are not required to be sitting members of parliament.

== Candidates ==
=== Declared ===
Candidate	Electorate	Experience
Alex Foulkes	outside parliament	Dunedin-based activist and conservationist.
Chlöe Swarbrick	Auckland Central	Incumbent electorate MP.

=== Declined to be candidates ===
- Steve Abel, list MP
- Julie Anne Genter, MP for Rongotai
- Francisco Hernandez, candidate in the 2023 general election
- Ricardo Menéndez March, list MP
- Tamatha Paul, MP for Wellington Central
- Teanau Tuiono, list MP

== Results ==
Results were announced by the Green Party on 10 March 2024.

2024 Green Party of Aotearoa co-leadership election
Candidate	Vote	%
Chlöe Swarbrick	169	98.83
Alex Foulkes	0	0.00
Re-open nominations	2	1.17
Total delegates	171	
Chlöe Swarbrick elected co-leader		
