= Joshua Love =

New Zealand hospitality entrepreneur

- Born: Joshua Nathanuel Love; 7 February 1991; Auckland, New Zealand
- Died: 7 February 2025 (aged 34); Mount Roskill, Auckland, New Zealand
- Political party: Opportunity Party (New Zealand)
- Criminal charges: Sexual assault
- Criminal penalty: 125 hours of community work, six months of supervision, $300 reparation for emotional harm
- Criminal status: Convicted of assault

Joshua Nathanuel Love (7 February 1991 – 7 February 2025) was a New Zealand hospitality entrepreneur and political candidate. He founded and directed 88 Cups Limited, a small coffee-shop chain trading as Eightyeight Cups with several "hole-in-the-wall" outlets in central Auckland.

Love pursued political office on two occasions. He announced his intention to contest the 2019 Auckland mayoral election but did not appear on the final list of candidates. In 2020 he was selected as the candidate of The Opportunities Party (TOP) for the Auckland Central electorate at the 2020 New Zealand general election, but resigned from the party on 1 July 2020 after an internal warning letter alleging misconduct was made public. He went on to contest the seat as an independent, placing ninth of eleven candidates with 73 candidate votes.

Love was killed on 7 February 2025, his 34th birthday, after being struck by three vehicles on Auckland's Southwestern Motorway near Mount Roskill. None of the drivers stopped. No driver had been publicly identified.

== 88 Cups ==
Queen Street in Auckland

The National Business Review described Love as a "born and bred Aucklander". He was the sole director and shareholder of 88 Cups Limited, a coffee-shop company incorporated on 21 July 2016 and trading as Eightyeight Cups. In 2018, Love auctioned a lifetime supply of coffee on TradeMe, putting the offer up at a reserve price of $1. By mid-2019 the business operated four "hole-in-the-wall" coffee outlets in central Auckland. A 2025 retrospective in the New Zealand Herald recorded outlets on Beach Road and two on Queen Street, and said Love had "been featured in media as a groundbreaking entrepreneur for his cafe chain." The chain closed during the COVID-19 pandemic. Love's family later said his "once successful and growing businesses eventually crumbled throughout the Covid lockdowns."

== Political history ==
=== 2019 Auckland mayoral campaign ===
In March 2019, Stuff named Love among a group of minor declared candidates — alongside John Palino and Craig Lord — challenging incumbent mayor Phil Goff and his main rivals in the 2019 Auckland mayoral election. That July, the National Business Review profiled Love as the last in a series of candidate interviews. Goff was re-elected in October 2019. Love did not appear on the final candidate list when nominations closed.

=== 2020 Auckland Central candidacy ===
Love was selected as The Opportunities Party's candidate for the Auckland Central electorate ahead of the 2020 general election. On 1 July 2020 he resigned in a live video posted to his Facebook page, which then had around 11,000 followers, describing TOP as "the worst organisation I've worked for." The resignation followed a written warning from TOP secretary Ray McKeown that raised potential breaches of the Electoral Act 1993 and alleged "aggressive and confrontational" behaviour, including a claim that Love had attended a party meeting while hungover. TOP leader Geoff Simmons said the party treated Love's public response as a resignation, and that it had proven "difficult to make sure he's singing from the same song sheet." Love disputed parts of the letter, apologised to the board member concerned for making them "feel unsafe" while denying he had been aggressive, and said he would recontest the seat as an independent. Tuariki Delamere, a former Minister of Immigration, was subsequently selected as TOP's replacement candidate for Auckland Central. The following day, Newshub reported that a 20-year-old woman who had contacted Love to offer support after his resignation said he had asked her to send him nude photographs.

At the general election on 17 October 2020, Love stood in Auckland Central as an independent. Green Party candidate Chlöe Swarbrick won the seat. Love placed ninth of the eleven candidates on the ballot, receiving 73 of the electorate's 35,985 valid candidate votes.

== Assault conviction ==
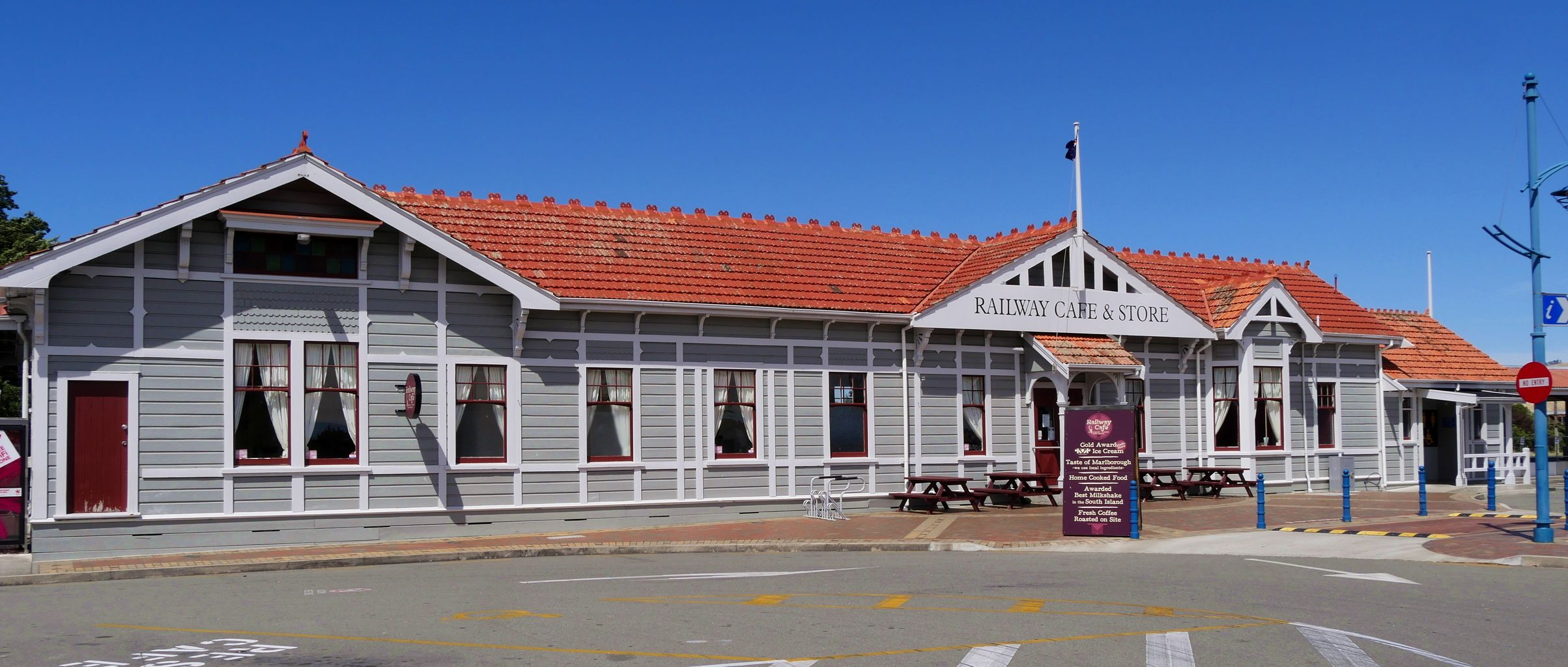
Blenheim Railway Station

In 2021, Love was charged with sexual assault following an incident involving a 17-year-old girl in the Blenheim railway station car park. He was subsequently convicted of assault and sentenced to 125 hours' community work, six months' supervision, and $300 reparation for emotional harm.

== Death ==
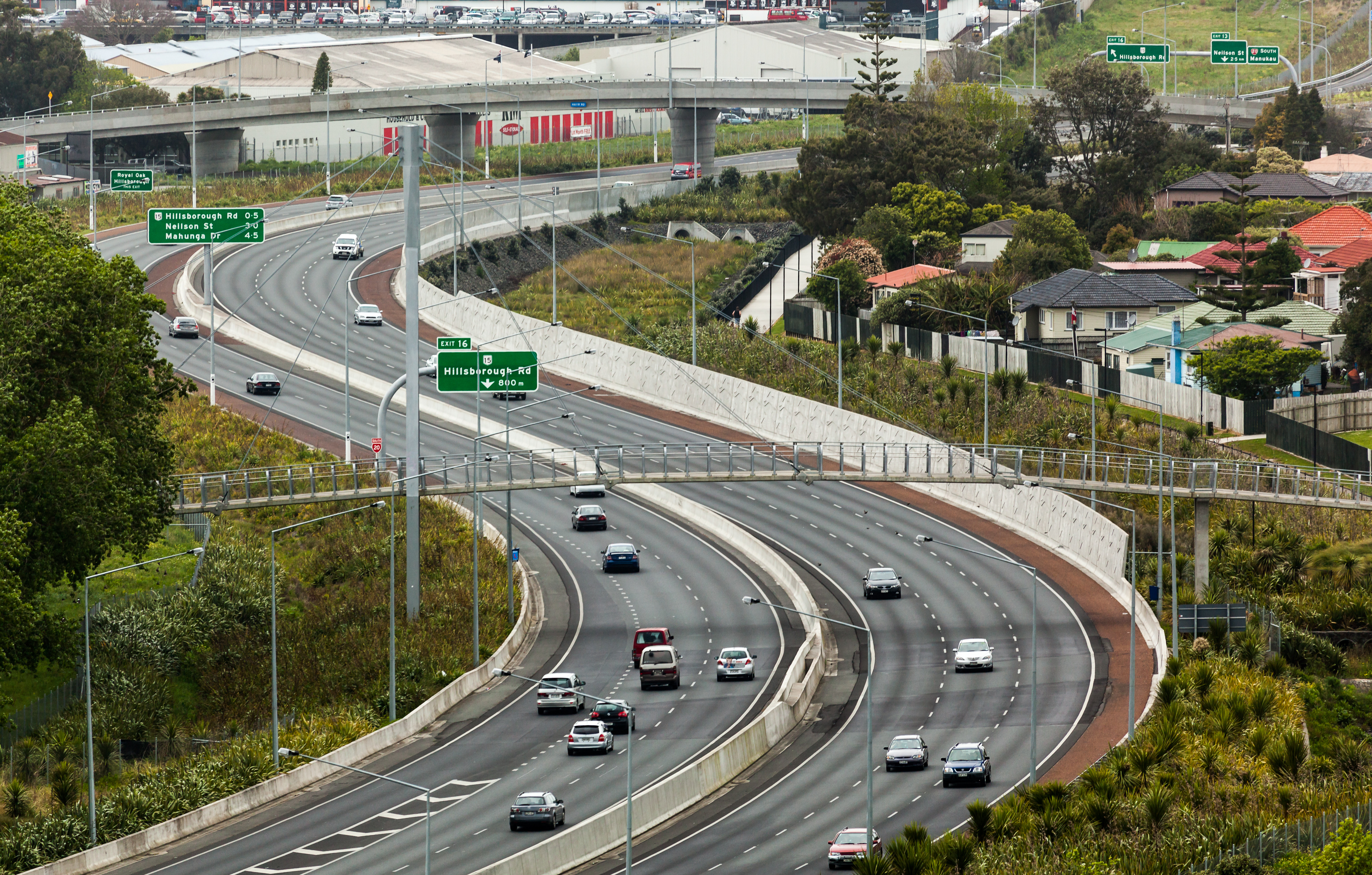
Southwestern Motorway from Mount Roskill

In the early hours of 7 February 2025 – his 34th birthday – Love walked onto State Highway 20 (Auckland's Southwestern Motorway) from the northbound Dominion Road on-ramp in Mount Roskill and was struck by three separate vehicles. None of the drivers stopped. Witnesses who came to his aid blocked the road where he lay from further traffic and stayed with him until he died. Police released his name to media on 12–13 February 2025 and appealed for information. A relative told the newspaper: "I just want to put out there that he was a decent person. He had a drive in him, in business, and in politics. He could have been really successful, he wanted to succeed in life ... no one has to be left [on the road] like that." The Opportunities Party issued a statement extending condolences: "TOP extends our deepest condolences to all of Joshua's whanau and friends. Our thoughts are with them at this difficult time."

A month after his death, police told RNZ that none of the drivers had come forward and that "vehicles as yet remain unidentified." A spokesperson for Love's family said they were "extremely disappointed" and appealed directly to the drivers to contact police: "We are all casualties in this tragedy, and we must imagine you are traumatised by this also." RNZ reported that Love's family were "appalled" by some media coverage of his death that included "details about his mental health and past police charges" and had made a complaint to the publication concerned.

Responding to press coverage of his 2021 conviction and history of mental-health difficulties, Love's family said he had "made no secret about his struggles with mental health, which tragically catapulted after his once successful and growing businesses eventually crumbled throughout the Covid lockdowns," adding that "his bravery in being honest and candid about his struggles was admirable." No driver had been publicly identified or charged.
