= Chlöe Swarbrick =

New Zealand politician (born 1994)

Chlöe Swarbrick MP
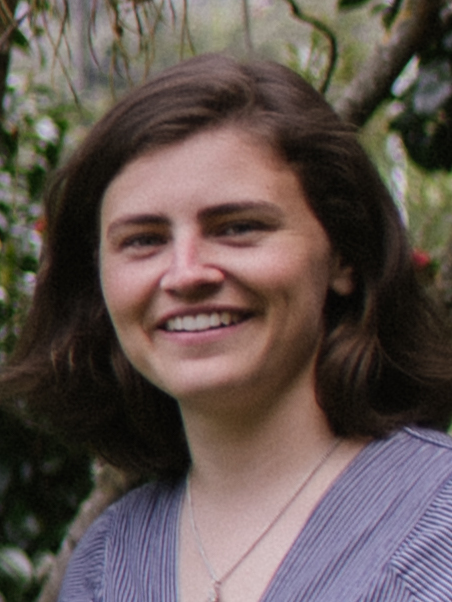
- Swarbrick in 2020

7th Co-leader of the Green Party
- Incumbent
- Assumed office 10 March 2024 Serving with Marama Davidson
- Preceded by: James Shaw

Member of the New Zealand Parliament for Auckland Central
- Incumbent
- Assumed office 17 October 2020
- Preceded by: Nikki Kaye
- Majority: 3,896 (2023)

Member of the New Zealand Parliament for Green Party List
- In office 23 September 2017 – 17 October 2020

Personal details
- Born: 26 June 1994 (age 32) Auckland, New Zealand
- Party: Green
- Education: University of Auckland (LLB, BA)
- Website: Green Party profile
- Swarbrick's voice recorded July 2024

Chlöe Charlotte Swarbrick (born 26 June 1994) is a New Zealand politician. She has been a Member of Parliament in the House of Representatives since 2017, and has served as co-leader of the Green Party of Aotearoa New Zealand since 2024.

Following a high-profile, but unsuccessful, run for the 2016 Auckland mayoral election, she became a parliamentary candidate for the Green Party, standing in the 2017 New Zealand general election, and was elected, via party list, as a member of Parliament (MP) at the age of 23. In the 2020 election, Swarbrick was elected as the MP for Auckland Central, becoming the second Green Party MP ever to win an electorate seat, and the first without a tacit endorsement from a major party leader. (Note: Former Green Party leader Jeanette Fitzsimons won the seat of Coromandel with the encouragement of Labour Party leader Helen Clark to potential Labour voters to give their electorate vote to Fitzsimons during the 1999 election.) She retained Auckland Central in the 2023 election. In March 2024, she was elected co-leader of the Green Party. Swarbrick is Green Party Spokesperson for Mental Health, Drug Law Reform, Revenue, Climate Change, and Finance.

== Early life and education ==
Swarbrick was born in Auckland in 1994 and went to Royal Oak Intermediate and Epsom Girls' Grammar School. Her parents separated when she was young, resulting in Swarbrick living with her mother in the UK for six months, followed by her father in Papua New Guinea for 18 months. Her father, who is right-leaning, taught her about how to articulate arguments and debate. She graduated with a Bachelor of Laws and a Bachelor of Arts in Philosophy from the University of Auckland in 2016. Swarbrick did not want to be a lawyer, instead wanting to learn more about the Treaty of Waitangi and the legal system. Swarbrick has taken some postgraduate-level courses in economics.

== Career ==
In 2012, Swarbrick opened her first business, a New Zealand-made fashion label called The Lucid Collective, with Alex Bartley Catt. Around the same time, she began working in the newsroom at the student radio station 95bFM as a news writer and newsreader, before becoming a producer and eventually host of The Wire. In April 2016, she resigned from her position as a regular host.

In 2014, Swarbrick wrote her first piece for What's Good magazine. She became the editor, and an owner. Later that year, The Lucid Collective held a New Zealand Fashion Week side-show at the Gow Langsford Gallery and participated in the "Youthquake" exhibition at the New Zealand Fashion Museum. The label went on to be stocked across Auckland, Wellington, and Christchurch, before Swarbrick and Bartley Catt closed the business.

Swarbrick launched The Goods, an offshoot of What's Good, in late 2015. The project opened a pop-up store in St Kevin's Arcade on Karangahape Road. Swarbrick won a New Zealander of the Year Local Hero Award. In 2016, Swarbrick and Bartley Catt started a digital consultancy and artist management agency called TIPS. The pair also opened a cafe and gallery, Olly, now listed permanently closed, next to the Crystal Palace Theatre in Mount Eden.

In May 2019, Swarbrick received the Jane Goodall Trailblazer Award. The award recognises individuals who have demonstrated dedication to the prosperity of animals, people, or the planet through their work. In 2020, Swarbrick was named to Fortune magazine's '40 Under 40' listing under the "Government and Politics" category. In August 2020, a short documentary film named Ok Chlöe was released about the background of Swarbrick and her political career.

== Political career ==
New Zealand Parliament
Years	Term	Electorate	List	Party
2017–2020	52nd	List	7	Green
2020–2023	53rd	Auckland Central	3	Green
2023–2026	54th	Auckland Central	3	Green
2026–present	55th	Auckland Central	2	Green

Swarbrick ran in the 2016 Auckland mayoral election, coming in third place, with 29,098 votes—almost 160,000 votes behind the winner, Phil Goff. In 2016 as a mayoral candidate, she gave a speech at a human blockade (organised by Auckland Peace Action) that briefly interrupted a New Zealand Defence Industry Association Forum.

Swarbrick said she entered the mayoral race as a form of protest after interviewing "uninspiring" potential candidates while working as a journalist for bFM and discovering that only 34% of the electorate had voted at the previous mayoral election. Swarbrick gained significant media attention largely due to her age. After losing the mayoral race, she joined the Green Party.

Soon after joining the Green Party, Swarbrick announced she would challenge sitting Green MP Denise Roche as the party's candidate in the Auckland Central electorate for the 2017 general election. Her challenge was unsuccessful, as the local branch selected Denise Roche to stand in the seat again. Swarbrick was selected instead to stand for the Maungakiekie electorate, and placed 7th on the party list. At age 23, she was the youngest politician to enter Parliament in New Zealand since Marilyn Waring in 1975.

=== First term, 2017–2020 ===
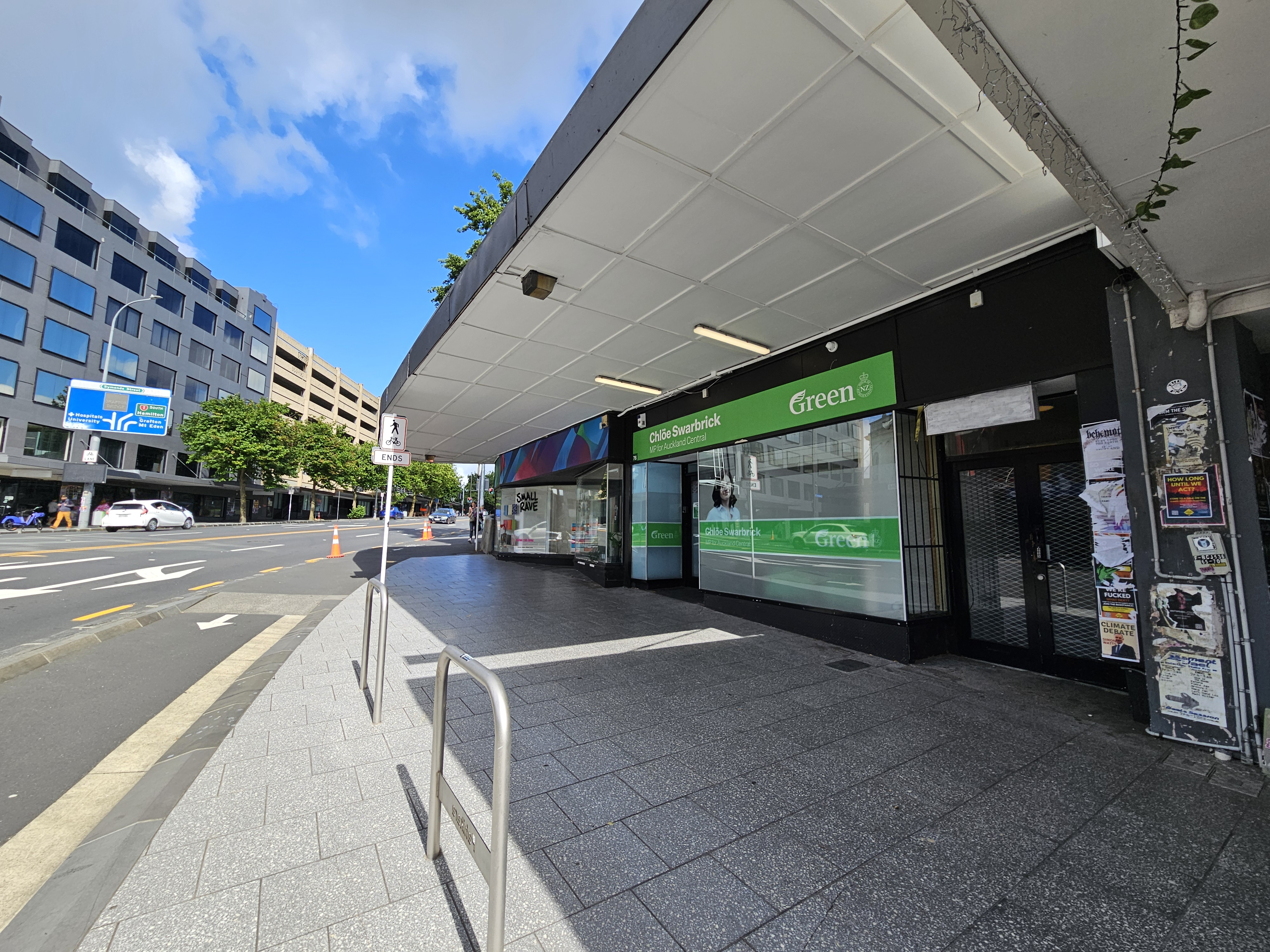
Swarbrick's Auckland Central electorate office on Karangahape Road

==== Election access ====
After the 2017 general election, Swarbrick lodged the Election Access Fund Bill (a member's bill originally drafted by Mojo Mathers) in the member's ballot and in February 2018 this bill was drawn from the ballot. This piece of legislation aims to "establish an Election Access Fund to be administered by the Electoral Commission and used by any disabled candidate to cover disability-related costs of standing in a general election, by not-for-profit bodies to cover costs of making election education events and materials accessible, and by registered political parties to support access needs of any members to allow them to participate within the party." The Bill passed its first reading in May 2018 with unanimous support. It passed its second reading in December 2019, and its third reading in March 2020. The unanimous passing of the Bill is particularly significant, as it is the first Green Party Bill to achieve this.

==== Drug reform ====
Swarbrick also inherited the Misuse of Drugs (Medicinal Cannabis and Other Matters) Amendment Bill from fellow Green Party MP Julie Anne Genter. Swarbrick gained endorsements from former Prime Minister Helen Clark and Grey Power for this piece of legislation. This Bill was however voted down in January 2018. Swarbrick has since negotiated changes to David Clark's Misuse of Drugs (Medicinal Cannabis) Amendment Act including the inclusion of local native strains of cannabis in New Zealand and a guarantee that the medicinal cannabis regulations this bill empowers be made public and functioning within a year. She is also a staunch campaigner for the legalisation of recreational cannabis.

Swarbrick took on the Green Party's Drug Law Reform portfolio in January 2018. In response to New Zealand's synthetics crisis and more than 50 associated deaths, Swarbrick launched a campaign for an end to the criminalisation of drug users and addicts. Within the government's Misuse of Drugs Amendment Bill, Swarbrick negotiated a formalisation of police discretion that requires police 'should not' prosecute unless it is in the public interest and the user would benefit from a therapeutic approach.

During 2018, Swarbrick worked with other MPs across parliament to form a Cross-Party Group on Drug Harm Reduction, she repeatedly called on the New Zealand National Party to join this group. In response to a call from National MP Matt Doocey for cross-party work on mental health, Swarbrick proposed creating a group merging the Cross-Party Group on Drug Harm Reduction and a mental health group, in August 2019, this group, the Cross-Party Group on Mental Health and Addictions was launched, with members from every party in Parliament.

From the starting point of a parliament disagreeing on how to implement medicinal cannabis, Swarbrick worked to establish a medicinal cannabis regulatory regime allowing local cannabis strains to be registered in New Zealand and removing barriers to legal and high-value careers for people with former cannabis convictions. In 2018, Swarbrick and Kiri Allan launched the political podcast Authorised By. Following the release of the preliminary results for the 2020 New Zealand cannabis referendum (in which 51.17% voted against the proposed legalisation of cannabis), Swarbrick vowed to continue the fight for decriminalising cannabis. She criticised the "Say Nope to Dope" campaign for allegedly spreading misinformation and called on her fellow MPs to support drug reform.

==== Mental health ====
Swarbrick fought to secure and retain security for community mental health services. In particular, she obtained extensions to funding for Te Whare Mahana Trust in Golden Bay / Mohua and Te Kuwatawata in the Gisborne region. Swarbrick also worked to establish and expand the Piki pilot programme, which provides young people aged 18–25 with free mental health support.

==== Climate emergency ====
In May 2019 Swarbrick attempted to obtain unanimous leave to pass a motion to declare a climate change emergency. This was unsuccessful due to the National Party's opposition to it.

==== Fossil fuel divestment ====
In March 2020, Swarbrick advocated for a mandate requiring public funds to divest from fossil fuels. She secured a public briefing into ACC, which has nearly $1 billion invested into fossil fuels. Swarbrick has publicly challenged the Minister of Finance to use his discretion under the Crown Entities Act to take "action to prevent a climate crisis". Her Member's Bill which directs the Government to shift away from fossil fuel investment, currently sits in the ballot.

==== "OK boomer" ====
In November 2019 Swarbrick responded to then opposition spokesperson for climate change Todd Muller with the phrase "OK boomer" after he interrupted her speech on climate change. Swarbrick was commenting on the Zero Carbon bill, which aims to reduce net carbon emissions in New Zealand to zero by 2050, when she used the phrase. Although there was little reaction to her comment in Parliament, her two-word throwaway remark became a talking point in media around the world. Writing in The Guardian, she said: "My 'OK boomer' comment in parliament was off-the-cuff, albeit symbolic of the collective exhaustion of multiple generations."

==== Education work ====
During New Zealand's COVID-19 response, the government released a tertiary support package. This package was considered unhelpful by students and student associations. In addition, several university halls of residence continued to charge students who left their accommodation during the nationwide lockdown, to isolate elsewhere. Swarbrick maintained her support of students and called for universities to "do the right thing" and stop these charges. Her attention to the issue saw some universities delay these charges. Other universities completely waived fees for unused accommodation. Swarbrick's advocacy on behalf of students exposed a deeply underregulated sector. Swarbrick worked to obtain cross-party support to launch an Inquiry into student accommodation. Submissions for this opened on 4 June 2020.

=== Second term, 2020–2023 ===
==== 2020 general election ====
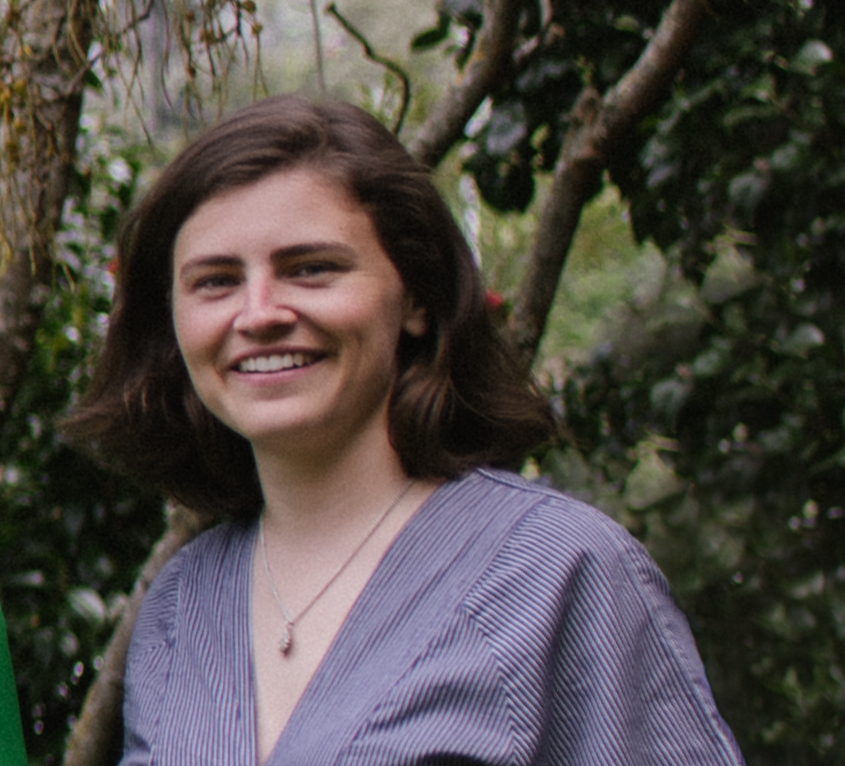
Swarbrick in 2020

During the 2020 New Zealand general election, Swarbrick contested and won the Auckland Central electorate, which had previously been held by retiring National MP Nikki Kaye. Swarbrick won Auckland Central with 12,631 votes, with Labour's Helen White coming second at 11,563 and National's Emma Mellow coming third at 9775. She became the second Green MP to have won an electorate in 21 years after former Greens co-leader Jeanette Fitzsimons won Coromandel in 1999, and the second minor party MP since the introduction of MMP in 1996 to win a general electorate seat without a tacit endorsement from a major party leader, after Winston Peters in Tauranga and later Northland.

==== Alcohol advertising ====
In mid-May 2021, Swarbrick proposed a bill that would give local councils the ability to regulate alcohol sales, trading hours, locations, and abolish appeals against local authorities' alcohol regulation policies. The second part of the legislation would also ban alcohol advertising and sponsorship from sports. On 30 June 2022, Swarbrick's Sale and Supply of Alcohol (Harm Minimisation) Amendment Bill was pulled from the member's bill ballot. Six local regional councils including the Auckland Council, Hamilton City Council, and Christchurch City Council have expressed support for Swarbrick's member's bill.

On 5 April 2023, Swarbrick's Sale and Supply of Alcohol (Harm Minimisation) Bill was defeated at its first reading by a margin of 89 to 30 votes. While the Labour Party allowed its MPs a conscience vote on the legislation, the National and ACT parties bloc voted in opposition to the Bill. Ultimately, 17 Labour MPs including the outgoing Jacinda Ardern joined the Greens and Te Pāti Māori in voting for the bill. Opposition to the bill centred on concerns about government overreach, its potential economic impact on businesses and the loss of funding from the alcohol industry for sports clubs. During the reading, fellow Green MP Elizabeth Kerekere accidentally sent a text message to the group chat for Green MPs and staff allegedly calling Swarbrick a "crybaby." Party co-leaders Shaw and Davidson condemned Kerekere's message for going against Green Party values and launched an investigation the following day.

=== Third term, 2023–present ===
During the 2023 New Zealand general election, Swarbrick was re-elected as the Member of the Auckland Central electorate by a margin of 3,896 votes, defeating the National Party's candidate Mahesh Muralidhar. On 29 November 2023, Swarbrick assumed the Green Party's associate climate change (adaptation), tertiary education and skills, revenue, mental health, drug law reform and Auckland Issues portfolios.

==== Climate change ====
On 13 December 2023, Swarbrick accused Prime Minister Christopher Luxon of lying about not weakening New Zealand's actions on climate change during a parliamentary debate. After ACT party leader David Seymour raised a point of order, Speaker Gerry Brownlee told her to apologise to Luxon. Swarbrick refused to apologise, stating that she was criticising the Government's policy rather than accusing him of lying; which would have constituted a breach of parliamentary rules. Under parliamentary rules, Swarbrick could have been referred to Parliament's Privileges Committee for discipline. On 21 December, Swarbrick apologised to Parliament for her remarks directed at Luxon following advice from the Clerks of the House.

In April 2026, Swarbrick and Belgian politician Saskia Bricmont wrote to the European Union Trade Commissioner Maroš Šefčovič, suggesting that National-led coalition government's methane target reduction could breach New Zealand's free trade agreement with the European Union and calling for an independent investigation. In June 2026, Šefčovič responded that the European Union was committed to working with New Zealand on transitioning towards net-zero economies and cooperating on the Paris Agreement. In response to Swarbrick's letter, Trade Minister Todd McClay accused her of "acting against the best interest of every New Zealander" and denied that New Zealand was breaching its free trade agreements and climate change obligations. He also welcomed the Commissioner's decision not to investigate New Zealand's alleged free trade agreement breaches. In late June 2026, the British Government asked the New Zealand Government to explain its plans to invest in oil and gas, and carbon emission targets.

==== Co-leadership and Green Budget ====
After James Shaw announced in late January 2024 that he would be retiring from politics and resigning as co-leader, Swarbrick declared on 2 February 2024 that she would be running in the 2024 Green Party of Aotearoa New Zealand co-leadership election to replace him. On 10 March, Swarbrick was confirmed as co-leader of the Green Party. She received 169 votes from delegates while her rival Alex Foulkes received none. During her acceptance speech, Swarbrick affirmed the party's commitment to the environment and the Treaty of Waitangi. She also announced her goal of forming the first Green government and described herself as a "well-researched radical." Swarbrick also criticised the incumbent National-led coalition government, claiming they were beholden to oil, gas and mining lobbyists seeking to destroy the environment.

On 1 May 2025, Swarbrick unveiled the Greens' alternative budget as an alternative to the upcoming 2025 New Zealand budget, which proposed investing $8 billion over the next four years in various green policies including creating a Ministry of Green Works and supporting sustainable infrastructure. Swarbrick said that the Ministry would create about 40,000 jobs. Other key policies have included a new wealth tax, higher corporate taxes, a private jet tax, higher mining royalties and income tax rates. In response, the ACT party described the Green Budget as a "reckless attack on family farming" while Prime Minister Luxon described the alternative budget as "clown show economics." On 18 May, Swarbrick defended the Green Budget as "realistic" during an interview with TVNZ journalist Jack Tame, saying that it had been "independently costed." During the party's annual general meeting in Wellington on 10 August, Swarbrick defended her Green Budget and urged the party's membership to expand their support base.

==== Israel-Palestine ====
In December 2024, Swarbrick submitted a member's bill calling on the New Zealand government to impose sanctions against Israel in response to the ongoing Gaza war. By 19 March 2025, the bill had attracted the support of the Greens, Labour and Te Pāti Māori. To pass into law, the bill needed the support of at least six government MPs.

==== Parliamentary conduct ====
On 12 August 2025, Swarbrick was removed from Parliament for the rest of the week by Speaker Brownlee after saying "If we find 6 of 68 Government MPs with a spine, we can stand on the right side of history" during a debate on the recognition of Palestine. On 13 August, Swarbrick refused to apologise and was "named" by Brownlee, who ordered her to leave Parliament's debating chamber once again. This punishment means that Swarbrick as an MP will have to leave the House of Representatives once again and will have her pay docked for the duration of her suspension.

On 4 August 2026, Swarbrick was ejected from Parliament after accusing Speaker Brownlee of showing favoritism towards New Zealand First leader Winston Peters over opposition Members of Parliament during a Question Time debate. Brownlee ordered her to leave the House of Representatives for the day after she accused him of exercising "double standards" towards Peters. Earlier, Peters had attracted controversy and criticism after telling Chinese New Zealander Green MP Lawrence Xu-Nan to "go back to your own country" during a parliamentary debate in late July 2026.

=== Fourth term, 2026–present ===
During the 2026 New Zealand general election, Swarbrick was ranked second on the Green Party list. She contested the Auckland Central electorate. On 7 November, she retained Auckland Central for the Greens by a margin of 2,831 votes.

== Personal life ==
On the topic of her sexuality, Swarbrick has said she "likes people", refusing to give a label. She says she did not come out of the closet because she was never in the closet, echoing a sentiment expressed by Scottish MP Mhairi Black. Swarbrick has referred to herself as queer in the past, and 2026 ended her relationship with her ex-fiance Nadine Walker. Swarbrick has been a vegetarian since the age of 14.

Swarbrick has a history of depression and anxiety. Swarbrick sees a psychologist weekly and is on anti-depressants. In September 2021, Swarbrick revealed that she received an adult diagnosis of attention deficit hyperactivity disorder (ADHD).

== Public image ==
=== OK Chlöe ===
OK Chlöe is a short documentary film directed by Charlotte Evans and produced by Letisha Tate-Dunning. The film premiered online as part of the seventh season of "Loading Docs". The documentary is about the political career of Swarbrick. The title OK Chlöe is based on the saying "OK Boomer", which is a phrase that Swarbrick said during a parliamentary speech in reply to a heckle from a National Party MP. The reply became viral. The film is about the full story of Swarbrick as she goes into details about both her personal life and professional life as a politician.

She talks about her work in legalising cannabis leading into the 2020 New Zealand cannabis referendum. It talks about how she feels being in the New Zealand Parliament, saying "Parliament is a toxic culture that chews people up and spits them out. You become inhuman and disconnected from the people you purport to represent." The film also talks about her background, from her personal life with her being adopted, struggles with mental health and coming out as bisexual, to her running for Auckland Mayor. After the release of the documentary, John Campbell questioned Chloe on some of the statements said on the documentary.

OK Chlöe was partly crowdfunded on Boosted.org.nz with a goal of $2,500, but reached $6,270 with 82 donors. Loading Docs received $195,342 of NZ On Air funding to produce 8 documentaries, which included OK Chlöe.

=== Being Chloe ===
In December 2021, NZ On Air and the New Zealand Film Commission allocated $200,000 and $20,000 to a feature-length documentary focusing on the political career of Swarbrick called Being Chloe. The documentary's producer is Letisha Tate-Dunning and would be filmed over the next two years. In mid-May 2022, the ACT party leader David Seymour and National Party leader Christopher Luxon criticised NZ On Air's decision to fund the documentary, claiming that it compromised the government funding agency's independence. In response to criticism, Swarbrick and Broadcasting Minister Kris Faafoi defended NZ On Air's decision to fund Being Chloe. Tate-Dunning also claimed that neither Swarbrick, the Green Party or NZ On Air had any editorial control over the documentary, which she stated would focus on Swarbrick balancing her political career with her priorities.

== Views and positions ==
=== Housing ===
In mid-October 2020, Swarbrick made remarks suggesting that it could be a conflict of interest for MPs who own multiple houses to be making decisions that affect the housing market.

In July 2022, Swarbrick urged the Auckland Council to consider establishing a homeless hotline for homeless individuals following the death of a 72-year-old woman who had been staying in her car in Remuera.

=== Israel and Palestine ===
Swarbrick supports Palestine, and has expressed sympathy for the Palestinians. On 11 May 2021, she and 16 other New Zealand Members of Parliament donned keffiyeh to mark World Keffiyeh Day.

In early November 2023, Swarbrick attracted criticism from ACT leader David Seymour, Israel Institute of New Zealand spokesperson David Cumin, and New Zealand Jewish Council leader Juliet Moses for chanting the slogan "from the river to the sea, Palestine will be free" during a Palestine solidarity rally held in response to the Gaza war. In response to criticism, Swarbrick apologised to those who took offense at her use of the phrase; however, she also defended its use by Jewish and Palestinian peace activists, and stated that it was antisemitic to conflate the actions of the Israeli government with the Jewish people. Swarbrick was accompanied by Ricardo Menéndez March, Steve Abel, and Darleen Tana, who chanted the phrase and called for "Palestine to be free".

Caretaker Prime Minister Chris Hipkins, and fellow Labour MPs Phil Twyford and Duncan Webb described the phrase as a "loaded statement which they would not use". Alternative Jewish Voices co-founder Marilyn Garson stated "the phrase was not a threat, but a call from the disempowered, dispossessed and oppressed for the regime of power to change." Human Rights Commissioner Paul Hunt expressed concern about the implications of the phrase for social cohesion. During an interview with TVNZ journalist Jack Tame in February 2024, Swarbrick acknowledged that a local Jewish school called Kadimah School had criticised her use of the phrase "From the river to the sea" but defended her use of the phrase as an expression of freedom.

=== Transport ===
Swarbrick expressed in 2016 that young people in Auckland had turned away from cars, often because of cost or environmental concerns. She said that of those who owned one, it was due to a lack of quality public transport. She said, "A great public transport system is the great social equaliser, so I'd really like to see that before I purchase a car, and I do think there's scope to even take my potential future children on that." In 2020, Swarbrick said she had personally "never owned a car" and that influenced her apartment selection. She said, "Being able to walk or bus everywhere with my trusty, worn-down Hop card was important."

=== Artificial intelligence ===
Swarbrick supports a "precautionary approach" to artificial intelligence (AI), and relates disruption from AI to other social issues such as inequality and the environment. She supports a precautionary pause on the development of artificial superintelligence, and she supports AI guardrails "or frameworks in place to ensure that AI is developed for the public good." On existential risk from artificial intelligence, she said that technology company leaders, economists, whistleblowers, and experts "tell you that we're headed towards existential collapse." However, she said her view was that it depends on "the responsibility that we're willing to take" and "at the end of the day, it is just a tool."

== Notes ==
Party political offices
Preceded by James Shaw	Co-leader of the Green Party; 2024–present Served alongside: Marama Davidson	Incumbent
New Zealand Parliament
Preceded by Nikki Kaye	Member of Parliament for Auckland Central; 2020–present	Incumbent
Preceded by Todd Barclay	Baby of the House; 2017–2023	Succeeded by Hana-Rawhiti Maipi-Clarke
