= Auckland Central (electorate) =

Electoral district in New Zealand

- Single-member general constituency for the New Zealand House of Representatives
- Interactive map of boundaries from the 2026 election (including islands on the Hauraki Gulf)
- Formation: 1887, 1905 (Note: Abolished between 1890 and 1905)
- Region: Auckland Region
- Character: Urban
- Term: 3 years

Member for Auckland Central
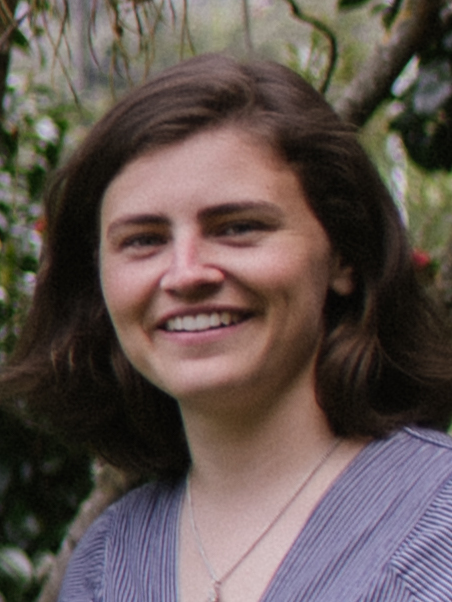
- Chlöe Swarbrick since 17 October 2020
- Party: Green
- Previous MP: Nikki Kaye (National)
Party vote distribution

Auckland Central is a New Zealand electoral division returning one member to the New Zealand House of Representatives. The electorate is currently represented by Chlöe Swarbrick, a member of the Green Party; she has represented the seat since 2020.

== Population centres ==
In the 1887 electoral redistribution, although the Representation Commission was required through the Representation Act 1887 to maintain existing electorates "as far as possible", rapid population growth in the North Island required the transfer of three seats from the South Island to the north. Ten new electorates were created, including Auckland Central, and one former electorate was recreated.

Auckland Central contains the Auckland city centre, the suburbs of Ponsonby, Westmere, Arch Hill, Herne Bay, Freemans Bay, St Mary's Bay, Mechanics Bay, Newton and Eden Terrace at the west side of the city. Because of the location of the main Auckland ferry terminal, Auckland Central also contains the islands of the Hauraki Gulf.

== History ==
Auckland Central was created ahead of the 1887 election; it was carved from parts of the electorates of Auckland North and the Auckland West and focused around upper Queen Street, Grafton, and Newton. It lasted only until the 1890 elections, when a reduction in the number of electorates meant Auckland Central was re-incorporated into a larger City of Auckland electorate. At the 1905 elections, the Auckland seat was split into three seats, including a recreated Auckland Central.

Map of boundaries at the 2020 and 2023 general elections (including islands on the Hauraki Gulf)

Following the 2007 boundary review, Grafton became part of Epsom and Point Chevalier moved into Mount Albert, while in order to offset these changes the suburb of Newton was drafted in from Mount Albert. Further population growth ahead of the 2014 election resulted in Westmere and Grey Lynn being transferred to Mount Albert in the 2014 boundary review. At the 2025 boundary review, the electorate gained Westmere, Western Springs and Grey Lynn from Mount Albert, and lost part of Arch Hill to Mount Albert and Grafton and Newton to Epsom.

The seat has been held by the Labour Party for most of its existence: between 1919 and 2008, the seat had spent only three years in the hands of another party (the left-wing Alliance, from 1993 to 1996). However, the 2008 election saw Nikki Kaye win the seat for the National Party for the first time. Kaye retained the seat in 2011, 2014 and 2017, although with a reduced majority making Auckland Central one of the most marginal electorates in the country. She retired at the 2020 election, which saw Green Party candidate Chlöe Swarbrick win the seat in a tight three-way contest and become only the second Green electorate MP.

=== Members of Parliament ===
Unless otherwise stated, all MPs terms began and ended at general elections.

Key

Independent Liberal Labour Alliance National Green

Election	Winner
1887 election	George Grey
(Electorate abolished 1890–1905, see Auckland)
1905 election	Alfred Kidd
1908 election	Albert Glover
1911 election	Albert Glover
1914 election	Albert Glover
1919 election	Bill Parry
1922 election	Bill Parry
1925 election	Bill Parry
1928 election	Bill Parry
1931 election	Bill Parry
1935 election	Bill Parry
1938 election	Bill Parry
1943 election	Bill Parry
1946 election	Bill Anderton
1949 election	Bill Anderton
1951 election	Bill Anderton
1954 election	Bill Anderton
1957 election	Bill Anderton
1960 election	Norman Douglas
1963 election	Norman Douglas
1966 election	Norman Douglas
1969 election	Norman Douglas
1972 election	Norman Douglas
1975 election	Richard Prebble
1978 election	Richard Prebble
1981 election	Richard Prebble
1984 election	Richard Prebble
1987 election	Richard Prebble
1990 election	Richard Prebble
1993 election	Sandra Lee
1996 election	Judith Tizard
1999 election	Judith Tizard
2002 election	Judith Tizard
2005 election	Judith Tizard
2008 election	Nikki Kaye
2011 election	Nikki Kaye
2014 election	Nikki Kaye
2017 election	Nikki Kaye
2020 election	Chlöe Swarbrick
2023 election	Chlöe Swarbrick
2026 election	Chlöe Swarbrick

=== List MPs ===
Members of Parliament elected from party lists in elections where that person also unsuccessfully contested the Auckland Central electorate. Unless otherwise stated, all MPs terms began and ended at general elections.

Key

ACT Alliance Green National Labour

Election	Winner
1996 election	Rodney Hide
1996 election	Sandra Lee
1999 election	Donna Awatere Huata
1999 election	Sandra Lee
1999 election	Nándor Tánczos
2002 election	Nándor Tánczos
2002 election	Pansy Wong
2005 election	Pansy Wong
2005	Nándor Tánczos (Note: Tanczos was not elected at the 2005 election but as he was next on the party list when Green MP Rod Donald died Tánczos regained his seat in Parliament, on 6 November 2005. He resigned from Parliament on 26 June 2008.)
2011 election	Jacinda Ardern
2011 election	Denise Roche
2014 election	Jacinda Ardern
2014 election	Denise Roche
2020 election	Helen White

== Election results ==
=== 2026 election ===
The next election will be held on 7 November 2026. Candidates for Auckland Central are listed at Candidates in the 2026 New Zealand general election by electorate § Auckland Central. Official results will be available after 27 November 2026.

=== 2023 election ===
2023 general election: Auckland Central
Notes:	Blue background denotes the winner of the electorate vote. Pink background denotes a candidate elected from their party list. Yellow background denotes an electorate win by a list member, or other incumbent. A ✓ or ✗ denotes status of any incumbent, win or lose respectively.						
Party	Candidate	Votes	%	±%	Party votes	%	±%
Green	✓ Chlöe Swarbrick	16,624	47.84	+12.74	8,503	23.97	+4.91
National	Mahesh Muralidhar	12,728	36.63	+9.47	11,751	33.13	+12.03
Labour	Oscar Sims	2,608	7.50	–24.63	8,028	22.63	–23.39
ACT	Felix Poole	1,235	3.55	+1.92	3,301	9.30	+1.82
Opportunities	Damian Sycamore	462	1.33	+0.44	1,250	3.52	+1.39
Legalise Cannabis	Christopher Coker	365	1.05	—	142	0.40	+0.13
Animal Justice	Madeleine Kane	135	0.38	—	50	0.14	—
Independent	Andi Shen Liu	110	0.31	—			
Rock The Vote NZ	Paul Davie	91	0.26	—			
New Nation	Guy Dennis Slocum	89	0.25	—	26	0.07	—
NZ First					1,351	3.80	+2.09
Te Pāti Māori					563	1.58	+1.28
NZ Loyal					217	0.61	—
Freedoms NZ					48	0.13	—
Women's Rights					45	0.12	—
NewZeal					38	0.10	+0.05 (Note: Compared to ONE Party)
DemocracyNZ					32	0.09	—
New Conservatives					30	0.08	–0.46
Leighton Baker Party					3	0.00	—
Informal votes		299			85		
Total valid votes		34,746			35,463		
Green hold	Majority	3,896	11.21	+8.24			

=== 2020 election ===
2020 general election: Auckland Central
Notes:	Blue background denotes the winner of the electorate vote. Pink background denotes a candidate elected from their party list. Yellow background denotes an electorate win by a list member, or other incumbent. A ✓ or ✗ denotes status of any incumbent, win or lose respectively.						
Party	Candidate	Votes	%	±%	Party votes	%	±%
Green	Chlöe Swarbrick	12,631	35.10	+25.38	6,937	19.06	+5.19
Labour	Helen White	11,563	32.13	−7.68	16,751	46.02	+8.31
National	Emma Mellow	9,775	27.16	−18.08	7,680	21.10	−18.05
ACT	Felix Poole	588	1.63	+1.11	2,724	7.48	+6.43
Opportunities	Tuariki Delamere	320	0.89	−1.44	776	2.13	−1.01
NZ First	Jenny Marcroft	274	0.76	−1.22	622	1.71	−2.16
New Conservative	Kevin Stitt	186	0.51	+0.33	197	0.54	+0.44
Sustainable NZ	Vernon Tava	120	0.33	—	59	0.16	—
Independent	Joshua Love	73	0.20	—			
TEA	Dominic Hoffman Dervan	50	0.14	—	35	0.10	—
Independent	Chris Sadler	23	0.06	—			
Advance NZ					198	0.53	—
Māori Party					111	0.30	−0.11
Legalise Cannabis					99	0.27	+0.03
ONE					20	0.05	—
Outdoors					15	0.04	+0.01
Vision NZ					11	0.03	—
Social Credit					7	0.02	+0.01
Heartland					1	0.00	—
Informal votes		382			160		
Total valid votes		35,985			36,403		
Turnout		36,625	83.95	+4.01			
Green gain from National	Majority	1,068	2.97	–2.24			

=== 2017 election ===
2017 general election: Auckland Central
Notes:	Blue background denotes the winner of the electorate vote. Pink background denotes a candidate elected from their party list. Yellow background denotes an electorate win by a list member, or other incumbent. A ✓ or ✗ denotes status of any incumbent, win or lose respectively.						
Party	Candidate	Votes	%	±%	Party votes	%	±%
National	✓ Nikki Kaye	13,198	45.24	−0.59	11,773	39.15	−5.78
Labour	Helen White	11,617	39.82	−3.80	11,340	37.71	+16.04
Green	Denise Roche	2,838	9.72	+2.10	4,170	13.87	−8.30
Opportunities	Mika Haka	681	2.33	—	944	3.14	—
NZ First	Frank Edwards	578	1.98	—	1,165	3.87	−1.31
ACT	Brooke van Velden	151	0.52	−0.19	317	1.05	−0.12
Climate First	Leslie Jones	55	0.19	—			
Conservative	Stephen Greenfield	52	0.18	−0.77	29	0.10	−0.81
Māori Party					123	0.41	−0.15
Legalise Cannabis					71	0.24	−0.06
United Future					19	0.06	−0.13
Ban 1080					12	0.04	0.00
Mana Party					12	0.04	−1.92 (Note: 2017 Mana Party swing is relative to the votes for Internet-Mana in 2014; it shared a party list with the Internet Party in the 2014 election)
Internet					10	0.03	−1.93 (Note: 2017 Internet Party swing is relative to the votes for Internet-Mana in 2014; it shared a party list with Mana Party in the 2014 election)
People's Party					10	0.03	—
Outdoors					8	0.03	—
Democrats					4	0.01	0.00
Informal votes		206			63		
Total valid votes		29,170			30,007		
Turnout		30,070	79.94	+1.39			
National hold	Majority	1,519	5.21	+3.01			

=== 2014 election ===
2014 general election: Auckland Central
Notes:	Blue background denotes the winner of the electorate vote. Pink background denotes a candidate elected from their party list. Yellow background denotes an electorate win by a list member, or other incumbent. A ✓ or ✗ denotes status of any incumbent, win or lose respectively.						
Party	Candidate	Votes	%	±%	Party votes	%	±%
National	✓ Nikki Kaye	12,494	45.84	+0.44	12,652	44.93	+2.70
Labour	Jacinda Ardern	11,894	43.63	+0.41	6,101	21.67	–3.44
Green	Denise Roche	2,080	7.63	–1.13	6,242	22.17	–0.63
Internet	Miriam Pierard	270	0.99	+0.99			
Conservative	Regan Monahan	258	0.95	+0.23	486	1.73	+0.91
ACT	Dasha Kovalenko	193	0.71	+0.26	329	1.17	–0.01
Climate	Peter Whitmore	50	0.18	+0.18			
Money Free	Jordan Osmaston	19	0.07	+0.07			
NZ First					1,459	5.18	+1.08
Internet Mana					553	1.96	+1.27 (Note: 2014 Internet Mana swing is relative to the votes for Mana in 2011; it shared a party list with Internet in the 2014 election.)
Māori Party					158	0.56	–1.08
Legalise Cannabis					85	0.30	–0.12
United Future					53	0.19	–0.03
Civilian					17	0.06	+0.06
Ban 1080					10	0.04	+0.04
Independent Coalition					7	0.02	+0.02
Democrats					3	0.01	–0.58
Focus					2	0.01	+0.01
Informal votes		195			99		
Total valid votes		27,453			28,256		
Turnout		28,040	76.76	+1.47			
National hold	Majority	600	2.20	+0.04			

=== 2011 election ===
2011 general election: Auckland Central
Notes:	Blue background denotes the winner of the electorate vote. Pink background denotes a candidate elected from their party list. Yellow background denotes an electorate win by a list member, or other incumbent. A ✓ or ✗ denotes status of any incumbent, win or lose respectively.						
Party	Candidate	Votes	%	±%	Party votes	%	±%
National	✓ Nikki Kaye	15,038	45.39	+2.48	14,447	42.24	+2.15
Labour	Jacinda Ardern	14,321	43.23	+4.69	8,590	25.11	–9.44
Green	Denise Roche	2,903	8.76	–4.66	7,797	22.79	+7.33
NZ First	Allen Davies	412	1.24	+1.24	1,403	4.10	+1.81
Conservative	Stephen Greenfield	238	0.72	+0.72	280	0.82	+0.82
ACT	David Seymour	149	0.45	–1.25	404	1.18	–2.95
Human Rights	Anthony van den Heuval	68	0.21	+0.01			
Māori Party					562	1.64	+0.71
Mana					237	0.69	+0.69
Democrats					202	0.59	+0.56
Legalise Cannabis					146	0.43	+0.14
United Future					75	0.22	–0.46
Libertarianz					53	0.15	+0.08
Alliance					10	0.03	–0.002
Informal votes		352			164		
Total valid votes		33,129			34,206		
National hold	Majority	717	2.16	–2.21			

=== 2008 election ===
2008 general election: Auckland Central
Notes:	Blue background denotes the winner of the electorate vote. Pink background denotes a candidate elected from their party list. Yellow background denotes an electorate win by a list member, or other incumbent. A ✓ or ✗ denotes status of any incumbent, win or lose respectively.						
Party	Candidate	Votes	%	±%	Party votes	%	±%
National	Nikki Kaye	14,677	42.91	+9.81	14,112	40.08	+6.36
Labour	✗ Judith Tizard	13,180	38.53	–5.36	12,166	34.55	–10.68
Green	Denise Roche	4,592	13.43	–1.38	5,446	15.47	+2.49
ACT	Scott Uren	581	1.70	+0.15	1,456	4.14	+2.35
Legalise Cannabis	Kevin O'Connell	349	1.02	–	101	0.29	+0.12
Progressive	Justin Robson	274	0.80	+0.06	226	0.64	–0.17
RAM	Oliver Woods	132	0.39	–	16	0.05	–
United Future	Aaron Galey-Young	128	0.37	–0.91	168	0.48	–0.82
Independent	Thomas Forde	84	0.25	–0.01			
Independent	Stephen Greenfield	68	0.20	–			
Human Rights	Anthony Ravlich	67	0.20	–			
Alliance	Sarita Divis	39	0.11	–	11	0.03	–0.02
RONZ	Kerry Bevin	32	0.09	+0.00	10	0.03	+0.02
NZ First					806	2.29	–0.55
Māori Party					328	0.93	+0.33
Bill and Ben					132	0.37	–
Pacific					73	0.21	–
Kiwi					70	0.20	–
Family Party					38	0.11	–
Libertarianz					27	0.08	+0.01
Workers Party					12	0.03	–
Democrats					10	0.03	+0.00
Informal votes		290			101		
Total valid votes		34,203			35,208		
National gain from Labour	Majority	1,497	4.38	–6.42			

=== 2005 election ===
2005 general election: Auckland Central
Notes:	Blue background denotes the winner of the electorate vote. Pink background denotes a candidate elected from their party list. Yellow background denotes an electorate win by a list member, or other incumbent. A ✓ or ✗ denotes status of any incumbent, win or lose respectively.						
Party	Candidate	Votes	%	±%	Party votes	%	±%
Labour	✓ Judith Tizard	15,794	43.89	+0.56	16,639	45.24	
National	Pansy Wong	11,910	33.10	+6.73	12,403	33.72	
Green	Nándor Tánczos	5,327	14.80		4,775	12.98	
NZ First	Susan Baragwanath	996	2.77		1,044	2.84	
ACT	Helen Simpson	559	1.55		658	1.79	
United Future	Steve Taylor	461	1.28		477	1.30	
Māori Party	Bronwyn Yates	330	0.92		223	0.61	
Progressive	Petronella Townsend	266	0.74		297	0.81	
Destiny	Maureen Vincent	150	0.42		80	0.22	
Independent	Thomas Forde	91	0.25				
Direct Democracy	Dilip Rupa	69	0.19		15	0.04	
RONZ	Alan Candy	32	0.09		3	0.01	
Legalise Cannabis					61	0.17	
Christian Heritage					29	0.08	
Libertarianz					25	0.07	
Alliance					19	0.05	
Family Rights					13	0.04	
Democrats					10	0.03	
99 MP					5	0.01	
One NZ					5	0.01	
Informal votes		292			115		
Total valid votes		35,985			36,781		
Labour hold	Majority	3,884	10.79	–6.17			

=== 2002 election ===
2002 general election: Auckland Central
Notes:	Blue background denotes the winner of the electorate vote. Pink background denotes a candidate elected from their party list. Yellow background denotes an electorate win by a list member, or other incumbent. A ✓ or ✗ denotes status of any incumbent, win or lose respectively.						
Party	Candidate	Votes	%	±%	Party votes	%	±%
Labour	✓ Judith Tizard	13,298	43.33		13,929	44.10	
National	Pansy Wong	8,093	26.37		4,748	15.03	
Green	Nándor Tánczos	6,212	20.24		4,990	15.80	
ACT	Lech Beltowski	1,223	3.98		3,358	10.63	
United Future	Steve Taylor	770	2.51		1,266	4.01	
Alliance	Mike Treen	365	1.19		513	1.62	
Progressive	Vivienne Shepherd	333	1.08		468	1.48	
Christian Heritage	Sean Michael Reynolds	235	0.77		163	0.52	
Independent	Neil Head	97	0.32				
Independent	Anthony Van Den Heuvel	66	0.22				
NZ First					1,809	5.73	
Legalise Cannabis					164	0.52	
ORNZ					137	0.43	
Mana Māori					20	0.06	
One NZ					15	0.05	
NMP					3	0.01	
Informal votes		357			89		
Total valid votes		30,692			31,583		
Labour hold	Majority	5,205	16.96				

=== 1999 election ===
1999 general election: Auckland Central
Notes:	Blue background denotes the winner of the electorate vote. Pink background denotes a candidate elected from their party list. Yellow background denotes an electorate win by a list member, or other incumbent. A ✓ or ✗ denotes status of any incumbent, win or lose respectively.						
Party	Candidate	Votes	%	±%	Party votes	%	±%
Labour	✓ Judith Tizard	12,645	38.74		13,647	41.50	
National	Martin Poulsen	7,360	22.55		7,747	23.56	
Alliance	Sandra Lee	6,129	18.78		2,321	7.06	
Green	Nándor Tánczos	3,057	9.37		4,235	12.88	
ACT	Donna Awatere Huata	2,301	7.05		2,929	8.91	
Christian Heritage	Dick Holland	435	1.33		332	1.01	
NZ First	Dilip Rupa	380	1.16		671	2.04	
Blokes Liberation Front	Pieter de Jonge	169	0.52				
Mana Māori	Tame Iti	83	0.25		19	0.06	
South Island	Gerry Campbell	43	0.13		7	0.02	
Communist League	Terence Coggan	38	0.12				
Legalise Cannabis					296	0.90	
Christian Democrats					150	0.46	
United NZ					130	0.40	
Libertarianz					124	0.38	
Mauri Pacific					108	0.33	
Animals First					58	0.18	
McGillicuddy Serious					52	0.16	
Natural Law					27	0.08	
One NZ					17	0.05	
NMP					9	0.03	
People's Choice Party					4	0.01	
Freedom Movement					1	0.00	
Republican					1	0.00	
Informal votes							
Total valid votes		32,640			32,885		
Labour hold	Majority	5,285	16.19				

=== 1996 election ===
1996 general election: Auckland Central
Notes:	Blue background denotes the winner of the electorate vote. Pink background denotes a candidate elected from their party list. Yellow background denotes an electorate win by a list member, or other incumbent. A ✓ or ✗ denotes status of any incumbent, win or lose respectively.						
Party	Candidate	Votes	%	±%	Party votes	%	±%
Labour	✓ Judith Tizard	12,219	36.57		12,465	37.14	
Alliance	✗ Sandra Lee	8,866	26.53		3,855	11.49	
National	Shane Frith	7,462	22.33		8,945	26.65	
ACT	Rodney Hide	1,848	5.53		3,393	10.11	
NZ First	Richard Whittaker	1,565	4.68		2,307	6.87	
Christian Coalition	Barrie Patterson	398	1.19		598	1.78	
Progressive Green	Laurence Boomert	326	0.98		229	0.68	
McGillicuddy Serious	Alistair Ramsden	226	0.68		129	0.38	
Green Society	Simon Reeves	175	0.52		110	0.33	
Blokes Liberation Front	Chris Brady	139	0.42				
Natural Law	Mark Watts	108	0.32		70	0.21	
Independent	Peter de Jonge	27	0.08				
Citizens Party	Wayne Young	18	0.05				
Independent	Lynne Robertson	13	0.04				
Independent	Adam Le Lievre	10	0.03				
Independent	Victor Bryers	7	0.02				
Republican	Duane Sutton	7	0.02				
Legalise Cannabis					1,003	2.99	
United NZ					199	0.59	
Animals First					90	0.27	
Libertarianz					41	0.12	
Ethnic Minority Party					40	0.12	
Mana Māori					32	0.10	
Asia Pacific United					21	0.06	
Advance New Zealand					14	0.04	
Superannuitants & Youth					14	0.04	
Conservatives					5	0.01	
Te Tawharau					3	0.01	
Informal votes		286			137		
Total valid votes		33,414			33,563		
Labour gain from Alliance	Majority	3,353	9.99				

=== 1993 election ===
1993 general election: Auckland Central
Party	Candidate	Votes	%	±%
Alliance	Sandra Lee	8,106	33.20	
Labour	Richard Prebble	6,815	27.91	–16.14
National	Arthur Anae	4,242	17.37	
NZ First	Honoria Gray	967	3.96	
Christian Heritage	Arnold Kennedy	210	0.86	
McGillicuddy Serious	Graeme Minchin	206	0.84	
Natural Law	Gillian Sanson	74	0.30	
Blokes Liberation Front	Pete Millett	57	0.23	
Communist League	James Robb	32	0.13	
Majority		1,291	5.28	
Turnout		20,709	84.82	+3.52
Registered electors		24,414		

=== 1990 election ===
1990 general election: Auckland Central
Party	Candidate	Votes	%	±%
Labour	Richard Prebble	7,876	44.05	–21.20
National	Kathryn Hill	4,599	25.72	
Green	Mike Johnson	3,089	17.27	
NewLabour	Cliff Robinson	1,550	8.66	
Legalise Marijuana	Mike Finlayson	292	1.63	
McGillicuddy Serious	Vince Terreni	189	1.05	+0.06
Democrats	Byrt Jordan	181	1.01	–1.65
Blokes Liberation Front	Chris Brady	74	0.41	
Communist League	Russell Johnson	28	0.15	
Majority		3,277	18.32	–24.00
Turnout		17,878	81.30	–3.79
Registered electors		21,990		

=== 1987 election ===
1987 general election: Auckland Central
Party	Candidate	Votes	%	±%
Labour	Richard Prebble	11,259	65.25	+2.79
National	Stephen Mayer	3,904	22.62	
Left Alternative	Joce Jesson	1,090	6.31	
Democrats	Byrt Jordan	459	2.66	
Independent	Herb Bickley	262	1.51	
McGillicuddy Serious	Vince Terreni	172	0.99	
NZ Party	A C Dunn	109	0.63	
Majority		7,355	42.62	–1.65
Turnout		17,255	85.09	–3.26
Registered electors		20,278		

=== 1984 election ===
1984 general election: Auckland Central
Party	Candidate	Votes	%	±%
Labour	Richard Prebble	12,522	62.46	+1.28
National	Maureen Eardley-Wilmot	3,646	18.18	
NZ Party	Mark Sapsford	2,571	12.82	
Social Credit	Ian Andrews	751	3.74	
Women's	Lyn Cotman	253	1.26	
Values	Carlton D. Cowan	208	1.03	
Cheer Up	Vince Terreni	95	0.47	–0.69
Majority		8,876	44.27	+7.32
Turnout		20,046	88.35	+3.04
Registered electors		22,689		

=== 1981 election ===
1981 general election: Auckland Central
Party	Candidate	Votes	%	±%
Labour	Richard Prebble	10,952	61.18	+2.76
National	Dorice Reid	4,338	24.23	
Social Credit	Bruce Sheppard	2,401	13.41	
Cheer Up	Vince Terreni	208	1.16	
Majority		6,614	36.95	+
Turnout		17,899	85.31	+36.62
Registered electors		20,980		

=== 1978 election ===
1978 general election: Auckland Central
Party	Candidate	Votes	%	±%
Labour	Richard Prebble	9,603	58.42	+16.07
National	Maire Cole	4,319	26.27	
Social Credit	Martin Hine	1,683	10.23	
Values	Keith Charles Langton	704	4.28	
Independent Labour	Barry Shaw	65	0.39	+0.17
Socialist Action	Brigid Mulrennan	62	0.37	+0.08
Majority		5,284	32.14	+30.26
Turnout		16,436	48.69	–18.08
Registered electors		33,755		

=== 1975 election ===
1975 general election: Auckland Central
Party	Candidate	Votes	%	±%
Labour	Richard Prebble	6,506	42.35	
National	Murray McCully	6,217	40.46	
Values	Reg Clough	1,939	12.62	
Social Credit	Allan Donovan	410	2.66	–2.81
Christian Democratic	Tom Weal	172	1.11	
Socialist Action	Brigid Mulrennan	46	0.29	
Liberal	Peter Blakeborough	37	0.24	
Independent Labour	Barry Shaw	35	0.22	
Majority		289	1.88	
Turnout		15,362	66.77	–14.47
Registered electors		23,005		

=== 1972 election ===
1972 general election: Auckland Central
Party	Candidate	Votes	%	±%
Labour	Norman Douglas	7,105	50.75	–0.26
National	Clive Edwards	5,096	36.40	–9.24
Values	Dave Hopkinson	878	6.27	
Social Credit	Allan Donovan	767	5.47	
Independent Labour	Gordon Ingham	101	0.72	
New Democratic	Michael Pinkey	53	0.37	
Majority		2,009	14.35	+5.99
Turnout		14,000	81.24	–3.43
Registered electors		17,232		

=== 1969 election ===
1969 general election: Auckland Central
Party	Candidate	Votes	%	±%
Labour	Norman Douglas	6,851	51.01	–6.09
National	Clive Edwards	5,727	42.64	
Social Credit	Donald Bernard Guilford	507	3.77	
Independent Labour	Owen Gager	164	1.22	
Independent	Esther James	130	0.96	
Communist	Ralph Hegman	50	0.37	
Majority		1,124	8.36	–15.61
Turnout		13,429	84.67	+8.46
Registered electors		15,860		

=== 1966 election ===
1966 general election: Auckland Central
Party	Candidate	Votes	%	±%
Labour	Norman Douglas	6,103	57.10	–1.35
National	Marie Quinn	3,541	33.13	
Social Credit	John Reginald Burke	1,043	9.75	
Majority		2,562	23.97	–0.44
Turnout		10,687	76.21	–6.88
Registered electors		14,022		

=== 1963 election ===
1963 general election: Auckland Central
Party	Candidate	Votes	%	±%
Labour	Norman Douglas	7,727	58.45	+4.15
National	John Strevens	4,500	34.04	
Social Credit	Maxwell Rickard	563	4.25	
Liberal	David Anthony Hannay	273	2.06	
Communist	Dick Wolf	155	1.17	
Majority		3,227	24.41	+9.92
Turnout		13,218	83.09	+2.00
Registered electors		15,907		

=== 1960 election ===
1960 general election: Auckland Central
Party	Candidate	Votes	%	±%
Labour	Norman Douglas	6,915	54.30	
National	Ray Presland	5,069	39.80	
Social Credit	Lloyd Bishop Liddle	586	4.60	–0.45
Communist	Peter McAra	164	1.28	
Majority		1,846	14.49	
Turnout		12,734	81.09	–8.88
Registered electors		15,702		

=== 1957 election ===
1957 general election: Auckland Central
Party	Candidate	Votes	%	±%
Labour	Bill Anderton	9,144	60.15	–3.63
National	Aileen Joyce	5,288	34.78	
Social Credit	Lloyd Bishop Liddle	768	5.05	
Majority		3,856	25.36	–9.48
Turnout		15,200	89.97	+7.20
Registered electors		16,894		

=== 1954 election ===
1954 general election: Auckland Central
Party	Candidate	Votes	%	±%
Labour	Bill Anderton	7,493	63.78	+1.33
National	John Weir Stewart	3,400	28.94	
Social Credit	Alfred Humphries Gilbert	681	5.79	
Communist	Vic Wilcox	173	1.47	
Majority		4,093	34.84	+8.28
Turnout		11,747	82.77	+3.14
Registered electors		14,192		

=== 1951 election ===
1951 general election: Auckland Central
Party	Candidate	Votes	%	±%
Labour	Bill Anderton	5,097	62.45	–1.02
National	Peter Hillyer	2,929	35.89	
Communist	Johnny Mitchell	135	1.65	–0.91
Majority		2,168	26.56	–3.74
Turnout		8,161	79.63	–13.78
Registered electors		10,248		

=== 1949 election ===
1949 general election: Auckland Central
Party	Candidate	Votes	%	±%
Labour	Bill Anderton	5,863	63.47	–3.49
National	Leonard Bradley	3,064	33.17	
Communist	Johnny Mitchell	237	2.56	
Independent	Henry Jones	73	0.79	
Majority		2,799	30.30	–3.62
Turnout		9,237	93.41	+2.80
Registered electors		9,888		

=== 1946 election ===
1946 general election: Auckland Central
Party	Candidate	Votes	%	±%
Labour	Bill Anderton	6,865	66.96	
National	Leon Götz	3,387	33.03	
Majority		3,478	33.92	
Turnout		10,252	90.61	+3.22
Registered electors		11,314		

=== 1943 election ===
1943 general election: Auckland Central
Party	Candidate	Votes	%	±%
Labour	Bill Parry	8,022	63.03	–8.08
National	William George Stanley Swabey	3,253	25.55	
Democratic Labour	Lawrence Allen Wheatley	892	7.00	
Independent	Donald Wallace MacClure	389	3.05	
Majority		4,769	37.47	–5.83
Turnout		12,727	87.39	–0.07
Registered electors		14,562		

=== 1938 election ===
1938 general election: Auckland Central
Party	Candidate	Votes	%	±%
Labour	Bill Parry	10,151	71.11	–3.81
National	Clifford Reid Dodd	3,970	27.81	+10.66
Informal votes		153	1.07	–0.85
Majority		6,181	43.30	–14.46
Turnout		14,274	87.46	+1.49
Registered electors		16,320		

=== 1935 election ===
1935 general election: Auckland Central
Party	Candidate	Votes	%	±%
Labour	Bill Parry	6,871	74.92	+2.45
Democrat	Clifford Reid Dodd	1,573	17.15	
Liberal–Labour	John Lundon	284	3.09	
Independent	George Mullenger (Note: Mullenger ran as an independent, but was aligned to the Reform Party.)	264	2.87	
Communist	Tom Stanley	179	1.95	
Informal votes		177	1.92	+0.88
Majority		5,298	57.76	+6.69
Turnout		9,171	85.97	+15.86
Registered electors		10,667		

Table footnotes:

=== 1931 election ===
1931 general election: Auckland Central
Party	Candidate	Votes	%	±%
Labour	Bill Parry	5,382	72.47	+12.47
United	Harold Penfound Congdon	1,589	21.39	
Communist	Jim Edwards	456	6.14	
Majority		3,793	51.07	+19.60
Informal votes		78	1.04	–0.87
Turnout		7,505	70.11	–9.81
Registered electors		10,705		

=== 1928 election ===
1928 general election: Auckland Central
Party	Candidate	Votes	%	±%
Labour	Bill Parry	5,765	60.00	–4.20
United	William Hewitt	2,741	28.53	
Reform	Frederick John Lysnar	822	8.55	
Independent	James Joiner	281	2.92	
Majority		3,024	31.47	–8.15
Informal votes		187	1.91	0.89
Turnout		9,796	79.92	–6.92
Registered electors		12,257		

=== 1925 election ===
1925 general election: Auckland Central
Party	Candidate	Votes	%	±%
Labour	Bill Parry	5,672	64.20	+9.23
Reform	Charles Augustus Wilson	2,172	24.58	
Liberal	Frederick Stanley Morton	991	11.22	
Majority		3,500	39.62	+28.10
Informal votes		91	1.02	–0.54
Turnout		8,926	86.84	+2.68
Registered electors		10,279		

=== 1922 election ===
1922 general election: Auckland Central
Party	Candidate	Votes	%	±%
Labour	Bill Parry	4,786	54.97	+7.03
Liberal	Albert Glover	3,783	43.45	+4.91
Informal votes		136	1.56	+0.30
Majority		1,003	11.52	+2.12
Turnout		8,705	84.16	–1.31
Registered electors		10,343		

=== 1919 election ===
1919 general election: Auckland Central
Party	Candidate	Votes	%	±%
Labour	Bill Parry	4,007	47.94	
Liberal	Albert Glover	3,221	38.54	–18.39
Reform	John Jolley Thomas	1,023	12.24	
Informal votes		106	1.26	–0.14
Majority		786	9.40	
Turnout		8,357	85.47	+7.36
Registered electors		9,777		

=== 1914 election ===
1914 general election: Auckland Central
Party	Candidate	Votes	%	±%
Liberal	Albert Glover	4,053	56.93	+3.73
Social Democrat	Michael Joseph Savage	1,751	24.59	+1.01
Reform	William Richardson	1,315	18.47	+10.60
Informal votes		100	1.40	
Majority		2,302	32.33	
Turnout		7,119	78.11	+6.86
Registered electors		9,114		

=== 1911 election ===
1911 general election: Auckland Central
Party	Candidate	Votes	%	±%
Liberal	Albert Glover	4,061	53.20	–10.87
Socialist	Michael Joseph Savage	1,800	23.58	
Independent	James Gleeson	1,171	15.34	
Reform	William Richardson	601	7.87	
Informal votes		99	1.29	–0.92
Majority		2,261	29.62	–10.56
Turnout		7,633	71.25	–0.53
Registered electors		10,712		

=== 1908 election ===
1908 general election: Auckland Central, First ballot
Party	Candidate	Votes	%	±%
Liberal	Albert Glover	4,050	64.07	
Liberal	Alfred Kidd	1,510	23.88	–29.46
Ind. Labour League	Arthur Rosser	621	9.82	
Informal votes		140	2.21	–0.79
Majority		2,540	40.18	
Turnout		6,321	71.78	–6.20
Registered electors		8,806		

=== 1905 election ===
1905 general election: Auckland Central
Party	Candidate	Votes	%	±%
Liberal	Alfred Kidd	2,701	53.34	
Conservative	Lemuel Bagnall	1,762	34.80	
Ind. Labour League	James Aggers	360	7.11	
Independent	Samuel Alexander Tilly	51	1.00	
Conservative	Albert Penn Bradly	37	0.73	
Informal votes		152	3.00	
Majority		939	18.54	
Turnout		5,063	77.98	
Registered electors		6,492		

=== 1887 election ===
1887 general election, Auckland Central
Party	Candidate	Votes	%	±%
Independent	Sir George Grey	Unopposed		
Registered electors		1,782		

== Bibliography ==
- McRobie, Alan (1989). Electoral Atlas of New Zealand. Wellington: GP Books. ISBN 0-477-01384-8.
- Wilson, Jim (1985) [First published in 1913]. New Zealand Parliamentary Record, 1840–1984 (4th ed.). Wellington: V.R. Ward, Govt. Printer. OCLC 154283103.
- Norton, Clifford (1988). New Zealand Parliamentary Election Results 1946–1987: Occasional Publications No 1, Department of Political Science. Wellington: Victoria University of Wellington. ISBN 0-475-11200-8.
