= 2002 Speaker of the New Zealand House of Representatives election =

← 1996	26 August 2002	2005 →
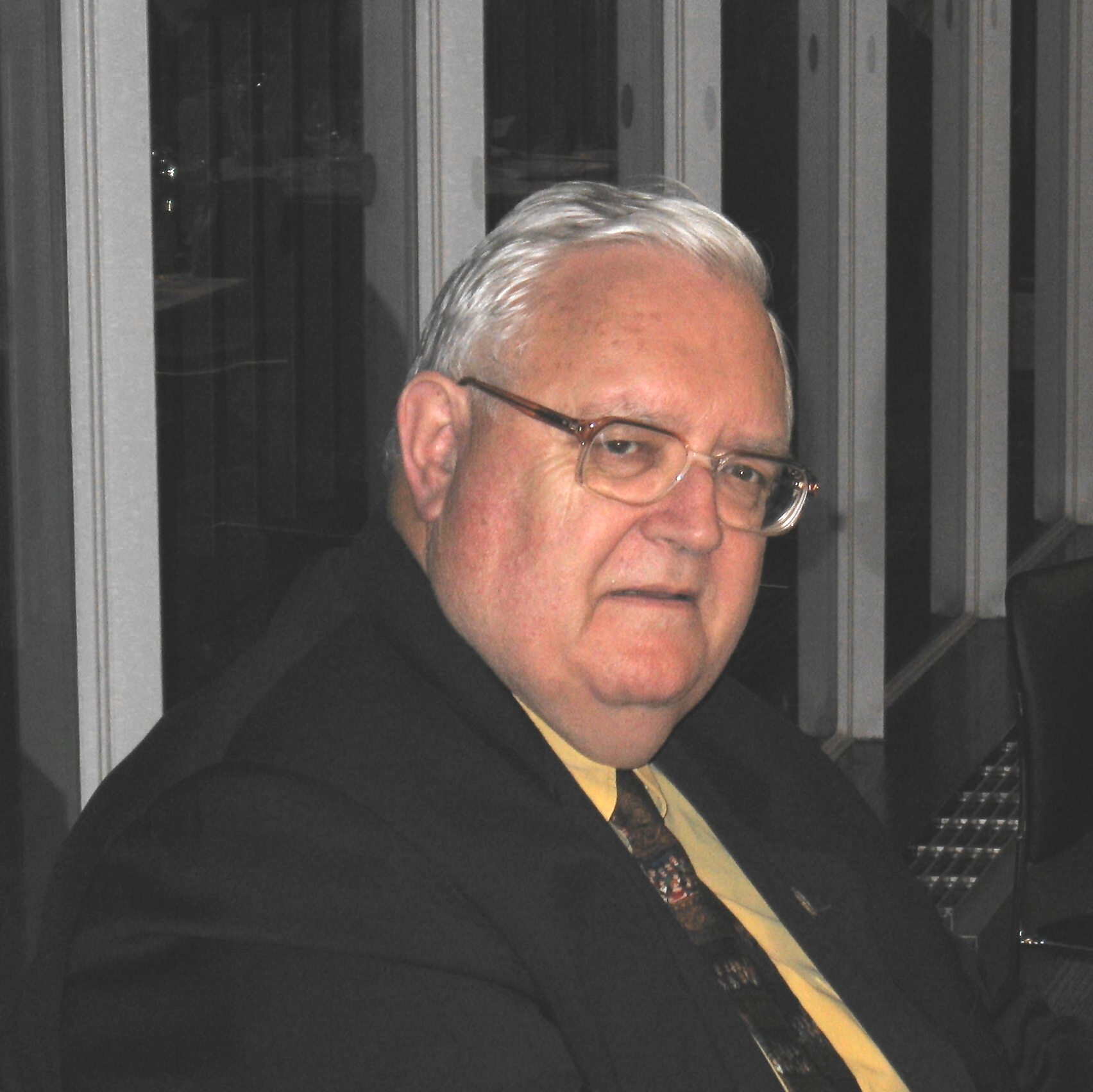

Candidate	Jonathan Hunt	Ken Shirley
Party	Labour	ACT
Popular vote	107	9
Percentage	92.24	7.75
Speaker before election
Jonathan Hunt
Labour
Elected Speaker
Jonathan Hunt
Labour

The 2002 election of the Speaker of the New Zealand House of Representatives occurred on 26 August 2002, following the 2002 general election result. The election resulted in the re-election of Labour Party MP Jonathan Hunt as Speaker. It was the first time an incumbent Speaker had been re-elected since 1982.

== Nominated candidates ==
Two candidates were nominated:

- Rt Hon Jonathan Hunt, List MP – Labour Party
- Hon Ken Shirley, List MP – ACT Party

== Election ==
The election was conducted by means of a conventional parliamentary motion. The Clerk of the House of Representatives conducted a vote on the question of the election of the Speaker, in accordance with Standing Order 19.

The following table gives the election results:

Party	Candidate	Votes	%
Labour	Jonathan Hunt	107	92.24
ACT	Ken Shirley	9	7.75
Majority		98	84.48
Turnout		116	—

How each MP voted:

Party	Name	Speaker Vote
United Future	Paul Adams	Hunt
United Future	Marc Alexander	Hunt
Progressive	Jim Anderton	Hunt
National	Shane Ardern	Hunt
ACT	Donna Awatere-Huata	Shirley
United Future	Larry Baldock	Hunt
Labour	Rick Barker	Hunt
Labour	Tim Barnett	Hunt
Labour	David Benson-Pope	Hunt
Labour	Georgina Beyer	Hunt
Green	Sue Bradford	Hunt
National	Don Brash	Hunt
NZ First	Peter Brown	Hunt
National	Gerry Brownlee	Hunt
Labour	Mark Burton	Hunt
Labour	Chris Carter	Hunt
National	John Carter	Hunt
NZ First	Brent Catchpole	Hunt
Labour	Steve Chadwick	Hunt
Labour	Ashraf Choudhary	Hunt
Labour	Helen Clark	Hunt
ACT	Deborah Coddington	Shirley
National	Judith Collins	Hunt
National	Brian Connell	Hunt
Labour	Clayton Cosgrove	Hunt
Labour	Michael Cullen	Hunt
Labour	David Cunliffe	Hunt
Labour	Lianne Dalziel	Hunt
Green	Rod Donald	Hunt
NZ First	Brian Donnelly	Hunt
Labour	Helen Duncan	Hunt
United Future	Peter Dunne	Hunt
Labour	Harry Duynhoven	Hunt
ACT	Gerry Eckhoff	Shirley
National	Bill English	Hunt
Green	Ian Ewen-Street	Hunt
Labour	Russell Fairbrother	Hunt
Labour	Taito Phillip Field	Hunt
ACT	Stephen Franks	Shirley
Labour	Martin Gallagher	Hunt
Labour	Mark Gosche	Hunt
National	Sandra Goudie	Hunt
NZ First	Bill Gudgeon	Hunt
Labour	Ann Hartley	Hunt
Labour	George Hawkins	Hunt
National	Phil Heatley	Hunt
Labour	Dave Hereora	Hunt
ACT	Rodney Hide	Shirley
Labour	Marian Hobbs	Hunt
Labour	Pete Hodgson	Hunt
Labour	Parekura Horomia	Hunt
Labour	Darren Hughes	Hunt
Labour	Jonathan Hunt	Hunt
National	Paul Hutchison	Hunt
NZ First	Dail Jones	Hunt
Green	Sue Kedgley	Hunt
National	John Key	Hunt
Labour	Annette King	Hunt
Labour	Winnie Laban	Hunt
Green	Keith Locke	Hunt
Labour	Janet Mackey	Hunt
Labour	Moana Mackey	Hunt
Labour	Steve Maharey	Hunt
Labour	Nanaia Mahuta	Hunt
Labour	Trevor Mallard	Hunt
National	Wayne Mapp	Hunt
NZ First	Ron Mark	Hunt
National	Murray McCully	Hunt
NZ First	Craig McNair	Hunt
ACT	Muriel Newman	Shirley
Labour	Damien O'Connor	Hunt
United Future	Bernie Ogilvy	Hunt
Labour	Mahara Okeroa	Hunt
Labour	David Parker	Hunt
Labour	Mark Peck	Hunt
NZ First	Edwin Perry	Hunt
NZ First	Jim Peters	Hunt
NZ First	Winston Peters	Hunt
Labour	Jill Pettis	Hunt
Labour	Lynne Pillay	Hunt
National	Simon Power	Hunt
ACT	Richard Prebble	Shirley
National	Katherine Rich	Hunt
Labour	Mita Ririnui	Hunt
Labour	Ross Robertson	Hunt
ACT	Heather Roy	Shirley
National	Tony Ryall	Hunt
Labour	Dover Samuels	Hunt
ACT	Ken Shirley	Shirley
National	Clem Simich	Hunt
National	Lockwood Smith	Hunt
United Future	Murray Smith	Hunt
National	Nick Smith	Hunt
National	Roger Sowry	Hunt
NZ First	Barbara Stewart	Hunt
Labour	Paul Swain	Hunt
Labour	John Tamihere	Hunt
Green	Nandor Tanczos	Hunt
National	Georgina Te Heuheu	Hunt
National	Lindsay Tisch	Hunt
Labour	Judith Tizard	Hunt
Green	Metiria Turei	Hunt
Labour	Tariana Turia	Hunt
United Future	Judy Turner	Hunt
ACT	Kenneth Wang	Shirley
Green	Mike Ward	Hunt
National	Maurice Williamson	Hunt
Labour	Margaret Wilson	Hunt
National	Pansy Wong	Hunt
NZ First	Doug Woolerton	Hunt
National	Richard Worth	Hunt
Labour	Dianne Yates	Hunt
