= Civil union in New Zealand =

Civil union has been legal in New Zealand since 26 April 2005. The Civil Union Act 2004 to establish the institution of civil union for same-sex and opposite-sex couples was passed by the Parliament on 9 December 2004.

The act has been described as very similar to the Marriage Act 1955 with references to "marriage" replaced by "civil union". A companion bill, the Relationships (Statutory References) Act, was passed shortly thereafter on 15 March 2005, to remove discriminatory provisions on the basis of relationship status from a range of statutes and regulations. As a result of these bills, all couples in New Zealand, whether married, in a civil union, or in a de facto partnership, now generally enjoy the same rights and undertake the same obligations. These rights extend to immigration, next-of-kin status, social welfare, matrimonial property and other areas. Non-married couples are not, however, permitted to adopt children, although people in non-marital relationships can adopt as individuals.

== History ==
Both the Civil Union Bill and the Relationships (Statutory References) Bill were promoted as part of their Ministerial responsibilities by the Labour MPs and Ministers David Benson-Pope and Lianne Dalziel. Civil Unions came into effect on Tuesday 26 April 2005 for licence applications and at least two couples had applied for licenses by 9:30 that morning. The first civil union ceremonies were performed on Friday 29 April 2005 (marriage and civil union licences need to be applied for at least three working days before the ceremony).

=== Civil Union Act 2004 ===
Civil Union Act 2004

New Zealand Parliament
- Passed: 9 December 2004
- Royal assent: 13 December 2004
- Commenced: 26 April 2005
- Administered by: Ministry of Justice

Legislative history
- Bill title: Civil Union Bill
- Introduced by: David Benson-Pope
- Introduced: 21 June 2004
- First reading: 24 June 2004
- Second reading: 2 December 2004
- Third reading: 9 December 2004

Amended by
- Civil Union Amendment Act 2007

Related legislation
- Relationships (Statutory References) Act 2005; Property (Relationships) Amendment Act 2005; Marriage (Definition of Marriage) Amendment Act 2013
- Status: Current legislation

The Civil Union Act 2004 is a New Zealand act of parliament legislating civil unions. It was passed into law on Thursday 9 December 2004 by a final vote of 65–55 in the New Zealand Parliament. The act makes it legal for those in same-sex as well as heterosexual relationships to enter into a civil union. The act is still in force, despite New Zealand providing same-sex marriages since 19 August 2013, under the Marriage (Definition of Marriage) Amendment Act 2013.

The Civil Union Bill was treated as a conscience issue by most parties, including the largest parties on the left and right, and passed its third and final reading by 65 votes to 55.

Civil Union Bill – Third Reading
Party	Votes for	Votes against
Labour	45: Rick Barker; Tim Barnett; David Benson-Pope; Georgina Beyer; Mark Burton; Chris Carter; Steve Chadwick; Ashraf Choudhary; Helen Clark; Michael Cullen; David Cunliffe; Lianne Dalziel; Helen Duncan; Ruth Dyson; Russell Fairbrother; Martin Gallagher; Phil Goff; Mark Gosche; Ann Hartley; George Hawkins; Dave Hereora; Marian Hobbs; Pete Hodgson; Parekura Horomia; Darren Hughes; Jonathan Hunt; Annette King; Luamanuvao Winnie Laban; Janet Mackey; Moana Mackey; Steve Maharey; Nanaia Mahuta; Trevor Mallard; Mahara Okeroa; David Parker; Mark Peck; Jill Pettis; Lynne Pillay; Mita Ririnui; Dover Samuels; Jim Sutton; Paul Swain; Judith Tizard; Margaret Wilson; Dianne Yates	6: Clayton Cosgrove; Damien O'Connor; Harry Duynhoven; Taito Phillip Field; Ross Robertson; John Tamihere
National	3: Katherine Rich; Clem Simich; Pansy Wong	24: Shane Ardern; Don Brash; Gerry Brownlee; David Carter; John Carter; Judith Collins; Brian Connell; Bill English; Sandra Goudie; Phil Heatley; Paul Hutchison; John Key; Wayne Mapp; Murray McCully; Simon Power; Tony Ryall; Lynda Scott; Lockwood Smith; Nick Smith; Roger Sowry; Georgina te Heuheu; Lindsay Tisch; Maurice Williamson; Richard Worth
NZ First	1: Brian Donnelly	12: Peter Brown; Brent Catchpole; Bill Gudgeon; Dail Jones; Ron Mark; Craig McNair; Pita Paraone; Edwin Perry; Jim Peters; Winston Peters; Barbara Stewart; Doug Woolerton
ACT	5: Deborah Coddington; Rodney Hide; Richard Prebble; Heather Roy; Ken Shirley	4: Gerry Eckhoff; Stephen Franks; Muriel Newman; Kenneth Wang
Green	9: Sue Bradford; Rod Donald; Ian Ewen-Street; Jeanette Fitzsimons; Sue Kedgely; Keith Locke; Nándor Tánczos; Metiria Turei; Mike Ward	–
United Future	–	8: Paul Adams; Marc Alexander; Larry Baldock; Gordon Copeland; Peter Dunne; Bernie Ogilvy; Murray Smith; Judy Turner
Progressive	2: Jim Anderton; Matt Robson	–
Māori Party	–	1: Tariana Turia
Totals	65	55

The act was opposed by religious groups, including the Catholic Church. Then New Zealand National Party leader Don Brash opposed the bill, but only as he believed it should be put to a referendum. The Act was widely supported by the then-governing New Zealand Labour Party.

During consideration of the bill, various amendments were proposed. These included making the issue subject to a binding referendum, (a motion moved by New Zealand First MP Ron Mark who voted for the first two readings of the Bill, but against in its final vote). Another was to replace it with a "civil relationships" bill that would allow any two people to register any personal relationship and to gain joint property rights (moved by National MP Richard Worth, a consistent opponent of the bill). These proposals were dismissed by supporters of the bill as delaying tactics rather than serious proposals and were defeated in Parliament by a block vote of Labour, the Greens, and the Progressives.

=== Relationships (Statutory References) Bill ===
The Relationships (Statutory References) Bill was also treated as a conscience vote and passed by 76 votes to 44 votes.

== Public opinion ==
Before passage, the New Zealand public supported the bill, with one opinion poll indicating around 56% in favour. The bill was controversial in some quarters, attracting strong opposition from the evangelical Destiny Church and the Catholic Church in New Zealand. However, not all Christians in New Zealand were opposed to the bill. Christians for Civil Unions played a role in the debates along with other Christian groups including the World Student Christian Federation.

In the build up to the vote, there were several instances of anti-gay and lesbian protests and rallies as a way of dissuading public favour. The most publicised rally was the 'Enough is Enough' march through central Wellington, terminating at Parliament, in August 2004. The march was organised by the Brian Tamaki-led Destiny Church and involved thousands of church members and supporters, many wearing black shirts, marching down Lambton Quay punching the air with their fists and chanting 'enough is enough'. Also present on this march were members of the Christian Heritage Party and white supremacist group National Front. Victoria University of Wellington's UniQ and other queer groups held a counter-rally in response, and were joined by transgender Member of Parliament Georgina Beyer.

Other protest action saw a theology student cover the windows of David Benson-Pope's South Dunedin electoral office with posters denouncing the bill. These bore the message 'Civil Unions Is (sic) Not Gay Marriage. Yeah Right' in a parody of Tui beer advertisements. Three months after the Civil Union Act came into effect, a Herald-DigiPoll survey revealed that a plurality of people who expressed an opinion either way were happy with the legislation. When asked "whether they were happy or unhappy with the way the law allowing civil unions is working," 46% said they were happy, 35.7% were unhappy, and 18.1% were undecided or refused to comment.

== Numbers ==
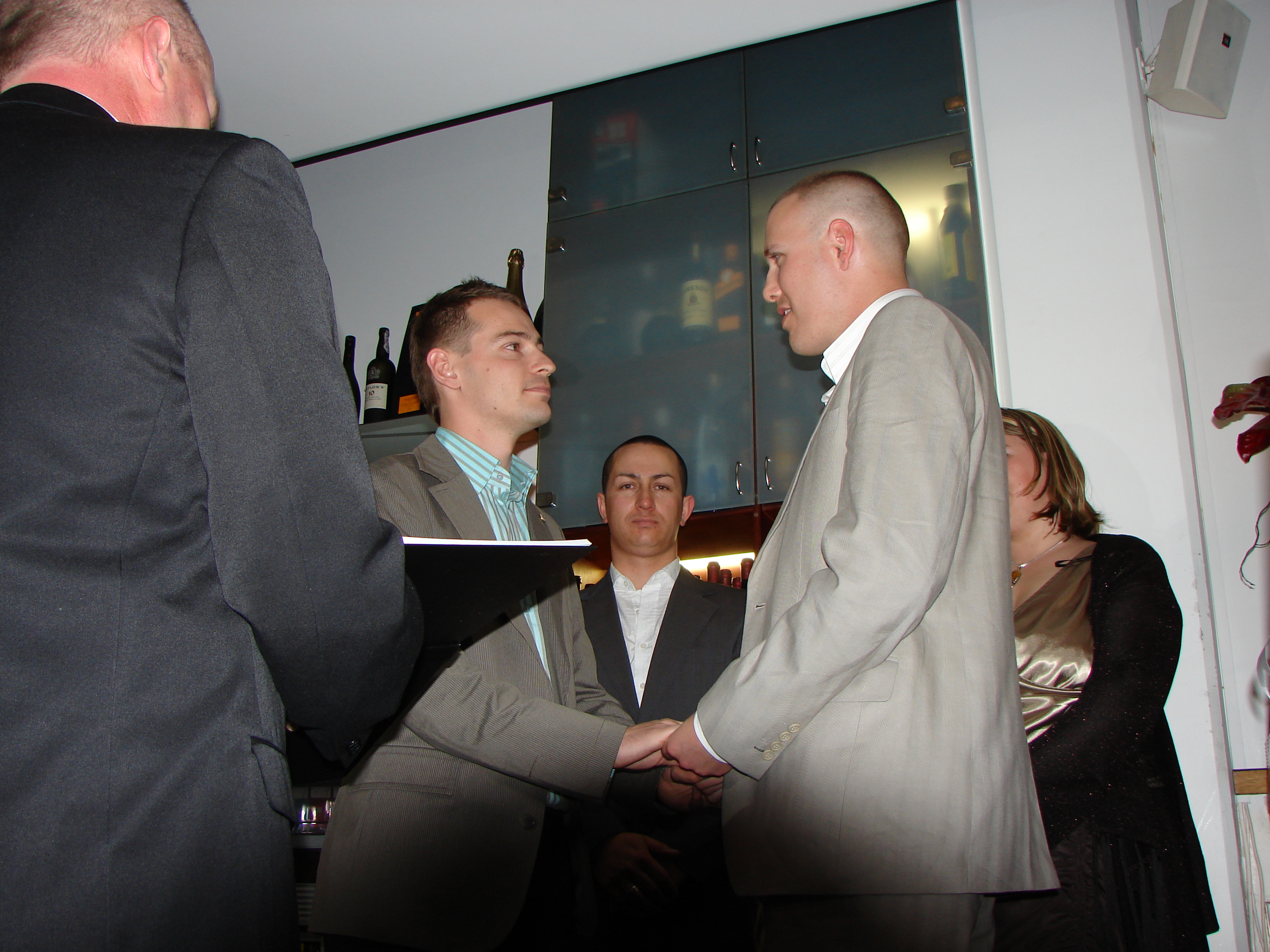
A civil union ceremony in Wellington, late 2006.

As at 31 December 2012, 2455 civil unions were registered to New Zealand residents. These comprised 1920 same-sex unions, of which 1131 had been between females and 789 had been between males, and 535 opposite-sex unions. In addition, 474 civil unions were registered to overseas residents. 124 civil unions had been dissolved.

Civil unions of New Zealand residents in New Zealand, 2005-12
Year	Same-sex civil unions		Opposite-sex civil unions	Total civil unions
Year	Female couples	Male couples	Opposite-sex civil unions	Total civil unions
2005	105	98	46	249
2006	182	115	77	374
2007	150	103	63	316
2008	145	111	71	327
2009	147	97	68	312
2010	127	73	73	273
2011	133	99	69	301
2012	142	93	68	303

== Forced civil unions ==
In 2012, National Party MP Jackie Blue submitted a member's bill, the Marriage (Court Consent to Marriage of Minors) Amendment Bill, to address the problem of forced marriages of 16 and 17-year-olds. There are about 80 applications per year for marriages between 16- and 17-year-olds. The bill was picked up by fellow National MP Jo Hayes after Blue left Parliament, and was drawn from the ballot on 13 April 2017.

The bill required 16 and 17-year-olds who wish to marry to apply to the Family Court for the consent of a Family Court Judge, in place of consent from a parent or guardian, and set out how the court is to consider the application. At the Select Committee stage, the bill was broadened to cover civil unions and de facto relationships in addition to marriages, and was retitled the Minors (Court Consent to Relationships) Legislation Bill. The bill passed its third reading on 8 August 2018, received Royal Assent on 13 August and came into force the following day.

== See also ==
- Marriage in New Zealand
- Same-sex marriage in New Zealand
- LGBT rights in New Zealand
- LGBT in New Zealand
- Property (Relationships) Act 1976
