= 2005 Speaker of the New Zealand House of Representatives election =

- 3 March 2005
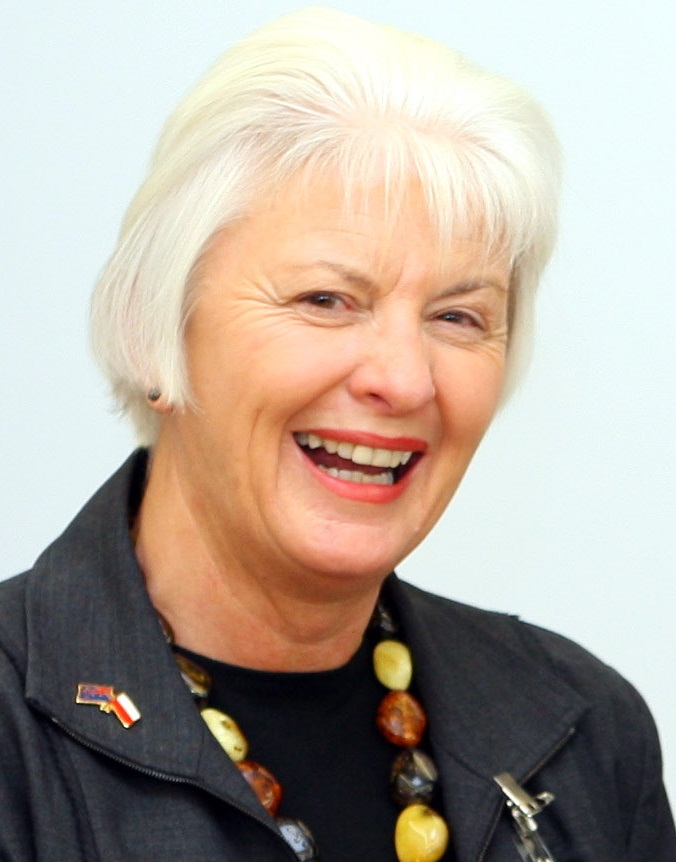

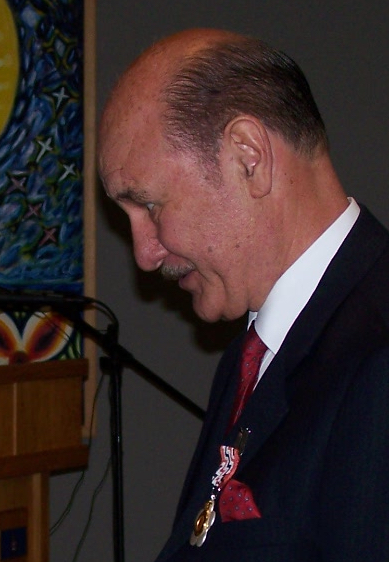

Candidate	Margaret Wilson	Clem Simich	Ken Shirley
Party	Labour	National	ACT
Popular vote	64	37	5
Percentage	60.37	34.90	4.71
Speaker before election
Jonathan Hunt
Labour
Elected Speaker
Margaret Wilson
Labour

The 2005 election of the Speaker of the New Zealand House of Representatives occurred on 3 March 2005, following the retirement of the previous Speaker Jonathan Hunt. The election resulted in the election of Labour Party MP Margaret Wilson.

== Nominated candidates ==
- Hon Ken Shirley, List MP – ACT Party
- Hon Clem Simich, MP for Tamaki – National Party
- Hon Margaret Wilson, List MP – Labour Party

== Election ==
The election was conducted by means of a conventional parliamentary motion. The Clerk of the House of Representatives conducted a vote on the question of the election of the Speaker, in accordance with Standing Order 19.

The following table gives the election results:

Party	Candidate	Votes	%
Labour	Margaret Wilson	64	60.37
National	Clem Simich	37	34.90
ACT	Ken Shirley	5	4.71
Majority		27	25.47
Turnout		106	—

How each MP voted:

Party	Name	Speaker Vote
United Future	Paul Adams	Wilson
United Future	Marc Alexander	Wilson
Progressive	Jim Anderton	Wilson
National	Shane Ardern	Simich
United Future	Larry Baldock	Wilson
Labour	Rick Barker	Wilson
Labour	Tim Barnett	Wilson
Labour	David Benson-Pope	Wilson
Labour	Georgina Beyer	Wilson
Green	Sue Bradford	Wilson
National	Don Brash	Simich
NZ First	Peter Brown	Simich
National	Gerry Brownlee	Simich
Labour	Mark Burton	Wilson
Labour	Chris Carter	Wilson
National	John Carter	Simich
NZ First	Brent Catchpole	Simich
Labour	Steve Chadwick	Wilson
Labour	Ashraf Choudhary	Wilson
Labour	Helen Clark	Wilson
National	Judith Collins	Simich
National	Brian Connell	Simich
Labour	Clayton Cosgrove	Wilson
Labour	Michael Cullen	Wilson
Labour	David Cunliffe	Wilson
Labour	Lianne Dalziel	Wilson
Green	Rod Donald	Wilson
NZ First	Brian Donnelly	Simich
Labour	Helen Duncan	Wilson
United Future	Peter Dunne	Wilson
Labour	Harry Duynhoven	Wilson
ACT	Gerry Eckhoff	Shirley
National	Bill English	Simich
Green	Ian Ewen-Street	Wilson
Labour	Russell Fairbrother	Wilson
Labour	Taito Phillip Field	Wilson
Labour	Martin Gallagher	Wilson
Labour	Mark Gosche	Wilson
National	Sandra Goudie	Simich
NZ First	Bill Gudgeon	Simich
Labour	Ann Hartley	Wilson
Labour	George Hawkins	Wilson
National	Phil Heatley	Simich
Labour	Dave Hereora	Wilson
ACT	Rodney Hide	Shirley
Labour	Marian Hobbs	Wilson
Labour	Pete Hodgson	Wilson
Labour	Parekura Horomia	Wilson
Labour	Darren Hughes	Wilson
Labour	Jonathan Hunt	Wilson
National	Paul Hutchison	Simich
NZ First	Dail Jones	Simich
Green	Sue Kedgley	Wilson
National	John Key	Simich
Labour	Annette King	Wilson
Labour	Winnie Laban	Wilson
Green	Keith Locke	Wilson
Labour	Janet Mackey	Wilson
Labour	Moana Mackey	Wilson
Labour	Steve Maharey	Wilson
Labour	Nanaia Mahuta	Wilson
Labour	Trevor Mallard	Wilson
National	Wayne Mapp	Simich
NZ First	Ron Mark	Simich
National	Murray McCully	Simich
NZ First	Craig McNair	Simich
Labour	Damien O'Connor	Wilson
United Future	Bernie Ogilvy	Wilson
Labour	Mahara Okeroa	Wilson
Labour	David Parker	Wilson
Labour	Mark Peck	Wilson
NZ First	Edwin Perry	Simich
NZ First	Jim Peters	Simich
NZ First	Winston Peters	Simich
Labour	Jill Pettis	Wilson
Labour	Lynne Pillay	Wilson
National	Simon Power	Simich
ACT	Richard Prebble	Shirley
National	Katherine Rich	Simich
Labour	Mita Ririnui	Wilson
Labour	Ross Robertson	Wilson
National	Tony Ryall	Simich
Labour	Dover Samuels	Wilson
ACT	Ken Shirley	Shirley
National	Clem Simich	Simich
National	Lockwood Smith	Simich
United Future	Murray Smith	Wilson
National	Nick Smith	Simich
National	Roger Sowry	Simich
NZ First	Barbara Stewart	Simich
Labour	Paul Swain	Wilson
Labour	John Tamihere	Wilson
Green	Nandor Tanczos	Wilson
National	Georgina Te Heuheu	Simich
National	Lindsay Tisch	Simich
Labour	Judith Tizard	Wilson
Green	Metiria Turei	Wilson
Māori Party	Tariana Turia	Simich
United Future	Judy Turner	Wilson
ACT	Kenneth Wang	Shirley
Green	Mike Ward	Wilson
National	Maurice Williamson	Simich
Labour	Margaret Wilson	Wilson
National	Pansy Wong	Simich
NZ First	Doug Woolerton	Simich
Labour	Dianne Yates	Wilson
