= Wigram (electorate) =

- Single-member general constituency for the New Zealand House of Representatives
- Interactive map of boundaries from the 2026 election
- Formation: 1969, 1996
- Region: Canterbury
- Character: Suburban
- Term: 3 years

Member for Wigram
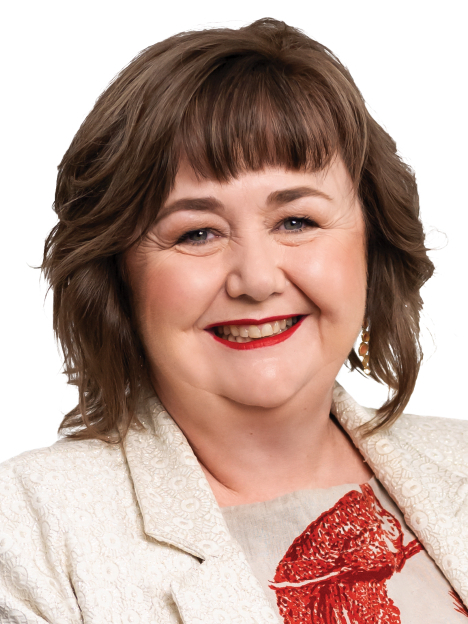
- Megan Woods since 26 November 2011
- Party: Labour
- Previous MP: Jim Anderton (Progressive)
Party vote distribution

Wigram is a New Zealand parliamentary electorate, returning one Member of Parliament to the New Zealand House of Representatives. The current MP for Wigram is Megan Woods of the Labour Party. She took over this position from Jim Anderton, who had held this position from 1996 until 2011.

== Population centres ==
Through an amendment in the Electoral Act in 1965, the number of electorates in the South Island was fixed at 25, an increase of one since the 1962 electoral redistribution. It was accepted that through the more rapid population growth in the North Island, the number of its electorates would continue to increase, and to keep proportionality, three new electorates were allowed for in the 1967 electoral redistribution for the next election. In the North Island, five electorates were newly created and one electorate was reconstituted while three electorates were abolished. In the South Island, three electorates were newly created (including Wigram) and one electorate was reconstituted while three electorates were abolished. The overall effect of the required changes was highly disruptive to existing electorates, with all but three electorates having their boundaries altered. These changes came into effect with the 1969 election.

The electorate's name comes from the suburb of Wigram, and by extension the former Wigram Aerodrome, itself named after colonial businessman Sir Henry Wigram.

Wigram is based around south-western Christchurch. The main suburbs in the seat are Spreydon, Addington, Hillmorton, Riccarton, Hornby and Sockburn. Following the 2013/2014 boundary review, it lost the suburb of Somerfield and parts of Hoon Hay to Port Hills. The electorate shifted southwards at the 2020 redistribution, gaining Aidanfield and parts of Hornby South from Port Hills and Selwyn, but losing Avonhead to Ilam. Following the 2025 boundary review, the electorate would shift south and west, gaining the communities of Prebbleton and Templeton from Selwyn and no longer retaining the suburban Addington-Spreydon area.

== History ==
The electorate had previously existed from 1969 to 1978, when it was held by Mick Connelly for Labour.

Map of boundaries at the 2020 and 2023 general elections

Wigram was one of the original sixty-five Mixed Member Proportional (MMP) electorates created ahead of the 1996 election, when the number of South Island seats was reduced to sixteen. The formerly safe Labour seat of Sydenham lies at Wigram's core, and Labour's strong showing in the party vote in both 2002 and 2005, where the party won nearly half of all party votes cast, indicates that Wigram's political inclinations are left-leaning in nature. Its most well-known MP Jim Anderton was himself the Labour MP for Sydenham between 1984 and 1989, before he split from the party over its political directions and formed the NewLabour Party, which later merged into the Alliance; the Alliance disintegrated in 2002, but Anderton, by then the leader of the Progressive Party, held off all challengers to easily hold the seat. In the 2011 election, the seat reverted to Labour candidate Megan Woods after his retirement, but the National Party comfortably won the party vote. The chairman of the Canterbury-Westland branch of the National Party, Roger Bridge, stated in April 2014 that Woods had a low profile and the Wigram electorate was now "winnable". Woods won re-election in the 2014 election with a more than a doubled majority. Woods retained the electorate seat through to the 2026 general election which she announced she would not contest.

=== Members of Parliament ===
Unless otherwise stated, all MPs terms began and started at general elections.

Key Labour Alliance Progressive

Election	Winner
1969 election	Mick Connelly
1972 election	Mick Connelly
1975 election	Mick Connelly
(Electorate abolished 1978–1996)
1996 election	Jim Anderton
1999 election	Jim Anderton
2002 election	Jim Anderton
2005 election	Jim Anderton
2008 election	Jim Anderton
2011 election	Megan Woods
2014 election	Megan Woods
2017 election	Megan Woods
2020 election	Megan Woods
2023 election	Megan Woods

== Election results ==
=== 2026 election ===
The next election will be held on 7 November 2026. Candidates for Wigram are listed at Candidates in the 2026 New Zealand general election by electorate § Wigram. Official results will be available after 27 November 2026.

=== 2023 election ===
2023 general election: Wigram
Notes:	Blue background denotes the winner of the electorate vote. Pink background denotes a candidate elected from their party list. Yellow background denotes an electorate win by a list member, or other incumbent. A ✓ or ✗ denotes status of any incumbent, win or lose respectively.						
Party	Candidate	Votes	%	±%	Party votes	%	±%
Labour	✓ Megan Woods	15,590	41.43	−20.65	11,249	29.55	−25.05
National	Tracy Summerfield	14,411	38.30	+14.13	13,401	35.20	+13.85
Green	Richard Wesley	3,780	10.05	+4.86	5,634	14.80	+5.79
ACT	Ankita Lynn	1,520	4.04	+1.29	2,465	6.48	+0.76
Legalise Cannabis	Blair Anderson	696	1.85		201	0.52	+0.10
NZ Loyal	Christine Van Duivenboden	392	1.04		253	0.66	
Leighton Baker Party	Debra Marie Cullimore	284	0.75		66	0.17	
Independent	Wiremu Thomson	125	0.33				
Independent	Geoff McTague	110	0.29	+0.08			
Economic Euthenics	Tubby Hansen	74	0.20	+0.01			
NZ First					1,922	5.05	+3.04
Opportunities					1,783	4.68	+2.24
Te Pāti Māori					316	0.83	+0.51
NewZeal					189	0.50	
Conservative					104	0.27	−0.02
Animal Justice					95	0.25	
DemocracyNZ					65	0.17	
Freedoms NZ					59	0.15	
Women's Rights					37	0.09	
New Nation					29	0.08	
Informal votes		647			196		
Total valid votes		37,629			38,064		
Turnout							
Labour hold	Majority	1,179	3.13	−32.26			

=== 2020 election ===
2020 general election: Wigram
Notes:	Blue background denotes the winner of the electorate vote. Pink background denotes a candidate elected from their party list. Yellow background denotes an electorate win by a list member, or other incumbent. A ✓ or ✗ denotes status of any incumbent, win or lose respectively.						
Party	Candidate	Votes	%	±%	Party votes	%	±%
Labour	✓ Megan Woods	24,186	62.08	+9.77	21,454	54.60	+13.12
National	Hamish Campbell	9,416	24.17	–14.00	8,388	21.35	−19.86
Green	Richard Wesley	2,022	5.19	+0.20	3,541	9.01	+2.31
ACT	Miles McConway	1072	2.75	+2.37	2247	5.72	+5.29
New Conservative	Averil Nuttall	638	1.64	—	639	1.63	+1.34
Advance NZ	Douglas Allington	308	0.75	—	282	0.72	—
ONE	Linda McLaughlin	244	0.63	—	162	0.41	—
Independent	Geoff McTague	81	0.21	–0.05			
Social Credit	Deane Landreth	76	0.20	+0.09	31	0.08	+0.03
Economic Euthenics	Tubby Hansen	75	0.19	+0.06			
Opportunities					957	2.44	–0.43
NZ First					791	2.01	−3.94
Legalise Cannabis					165	0.42	+0.06
Māori Party					124	0.32	−0.08
TEA					37	0.09	—
Outdoors					28	0.07	+0.01
Sustainable NZ					24	0.06	—
Vision NZ					15	0.04	—
Heartland					5	0.01	—
Informal votes		842			404		
Total valid votes		38,960			39,294		
Turnout							
Labour hold	Majority	14,770	37.91	+23.78			

=== 2017 election ===
2017 general election: Wigram
Notes:	Blue background denotes the winner of the electorate vote. Pink background denotes a candidate elected from their party list. Yellow background denotes an electorate win by a list member, or other incumbent. A ✓ or ✗ denotes status of any incumbent, win or lose respectively.						
Party	Candidate	Votes	%	±%	Party votes	%	±%
Labour	✓ Megan Woods	17,001	52.31	+3.36	13,827	41.39	+12.72
National	David Hiatt	12,407	38.17	+0.45	13,767	41.21	−1.70
Green	Richard Wesley	1,623	4.99	−2.84	2,239	6.70	−6.12
NZ First	Tane Apanui	1,186	3.65	—	1,986	5.95	−2.61
ACT	Ruth Knights	125	0.38	−0.69	145	0.43	−0.61
Independent	Geoff McTague	85	0.26	—			
Economic Euthenics	Tubby Hansen	41	0.13	−0.04			
Democrats	John Ring	35	0.11	−0.16	17	0.05	−0.05
Opportunities					960	2.87	—
Māori Party					134	0.40	−0.07
Legalise Cannabis					119	0.36	−0.14
Conservative					98	0.29	−3.32
United Future					32	0.10	−0.18
People's Party					22	0.07	—
Ban 1080					23	0.07	−0.06
Outdoors					21	0.06	—
Internet					9	0.03	−0.73 (Note: 2017 Internet Party swing is relative to the votes for Internet-Mana in 2014; it shared a party list with Mana Party in the 2014 election)
Mana Party					5	0.01	−0.75 (Note: 2017 Mana Party swing is relative to the votes for Internet-Mana in 2014; it shared a party list with the Internet Party in the 2014 election)
Informal votes		403			146		
Total valid votes		32,503			33,404		
Turnout		33,550					
Labour hold	Majority	4,594	14.13	+2.90			

=== 2014 election ===
2014 general election: Wigram
Notes:	Blue background denotes the winner of the electorate vote. Pink background denotes a candidate elected from their party list. Yellow background denotes an electorate win by a list member, or other incumbent. A ✓ or ✗ denotes status of any incumbent, win or lose respectively.						
Party	Candidate	Votes	%	±%	Party votes	%	±%
Labour	✓ Megan Woods	14,519	48.95	+3.84	8,764	28.67	−1.94
National	Karl Varley	11,189	37.72	−2.59	13,117	42.91	−1.64
Green	Richard Wesley	2,324	7.83	+0.07	3,919	12.82	−0.34
Conservative	Mark Peters	847	2.86	+0.34	1,102	3.61	+1.24
ACT	Shaun Grieve	318	1.07	+1.07	317	1.04	+0.41
Internet Mana	Lois McClintoch	213	0.72	+0.72	231	0.76	+0.56
Māori Party	Te Whe Phillips	122	0.41	+0.41	145	0.47	+0.03
Democrats	John Ring	79	0.27	+0.27	30	0.10	+0.10
Economic Euthenics	Tubby Hansen	51	0.17	+0.00			
NZ First					2,618	8.56	+2.52
Legalise Cannabis					154	0.50	−0.08
United Future					86	0.28	−0.50
Ban 1080					41	0.13	+0.13
Civilian					31	0.10	+0.10
Independent Coalition					7	0.02	+0.02
Focus					5	0.02	+0.02
Informal votes		401			136		
Total valid votes		29,662			30,567		
Labour hold	Majority	3,330	11.23	+6.43			

=== 2011 election ===
2011 general election: Wigram
Notes:	Blue background denotes the winner of the electorate vote. Pink background denotes a candidate elected from their party list. Yellow background denotes an electorate win by a list member, or other incumbent. A ✓ or ✗ denotes status of any incumbent, win or lose respectively.						
Party	Candidate	Votes	%	±%	Party votes	%	±%
Labour	Megan Woods	14,080	45.11	+29.97	9,866	30.61	−9.58
National	Sam Collins	12,580	40.31	+9.65	14,357	44.55	+6.63
Green	Richard Wesley	2,423	7.76	+2.53	4,243	13.16	+6.22
Alliance	Kevin Campbell	793	2.54	+2.38	158	0.49	+0.30
Conservative	Mark Peters	785	2.52	+2.52	763	2.37	+2.37
Legalise Cannabis	Geoffrey McTague	337	1.08	+1.08	186	0.58	+0.15
United Future	Ian Gaskin	159	0.51	−1.03	251	0.78	−0.23
Economic Euthenics	Tubby Hansen	53	0.17	+0.09			
NZ First					1,948	6.04	+3.05
ACT					202	0.63	−1.23
Māori Party					141	0.44	−0.13
Mana					66	0.20	+0.20
Libertarianz					33	0.10	+0.04
Democrats					16	0.05	+0.01
Informal votes		775			305		
Total valid votes		31,210			32,230		
Labour gain from Progressive	Majority	1,500	4.81	+34.16			

Electorate (as at 26 November 2011): 45,427

=== 2008 election ===
2008 general election: Wigram
Notes:	Blue background denotes the winner of the electorate vote. Pink background denotes a candidate elected from their party list. Yellow background denotes an electorate win by a list member, or other incumbent. A ✓ or ✗ denotes status of any incumbent, win or lose respectively.						
Party	Candidate	Votes	%	±%	Party votes	%	±%
Progressive	✓ Jim Anderton	15,320	44.50	−3.12	2,010	5.73	−0.73
National	Marc Alexander	10,553	30.66	+8.54	13,308	37.91	+8.75
Labour	Erin Ebborn-Gillespie	5,214	15.15	−3.97	14,108	40.19	−7.76
Green	Peter Taylor	1,802	5.23	+2.51	2,436	6.94	+2.29
NZ First	Steve Campbell	471	1.37	−1.58	1,050	2.99	−0.88
ACT	Matthew Gardiner	355	1.03	+0.42	653	1.86	+1.11
Kiwi	Lindsay Cameron	321	0.93	—	322	0.92	—
United Future	Vanessa Roberts	219	0.64	−2.31	355	1.01	−2.86
Alliance	Tom Dowie	55	0.16	−0.05	68	0.19	+0.03
Libertarianz	Ben Morgan	55	0.16	—	22	0.06	0.00
Democrats	John Charles Ring	32	0.09	—	13	0.04	0.00
Economic Euthenics	Tubby Hansen	28	0.08	−0.01			
Bill and Ben					251	0.72	—
Māori Party					198	0.56	+0.29
Legalise Cannabis					151	0.43	+0.17
Family Party					83	0.24	—
Pacific					51	0.15	—
Workers Party					17	0.05	—
RONZ					5	0.01	−0.01
RAM					1	0.00	—
Informal votes		440			291		
Total valid votes		34,425			35,102		
Turnout		35,393					
Progressive hold	Majority	4,767	13.85	−11.65			

=== 2005 election ===
2005 general election: Wigram
Notes:	Blue background denotes the winner of the electorate vote. Pink background denotes a candidate elected from their party list. Yellow background denotes an electorate win by a list member, or other incumbent. A ✓ or ✗ denotes status of any incumbent, win or lose respectively.						
Party	Candidate	Votes	%	±%	Party votes	%	±%
Progressive	✓ Jim Anderton	15,961	47.62	+11.94	2,191	6.46	
National	Alison Lomax	7,413	22.12	+8.27	9,895	29.16	
Labour	Mike Mora	6,408	19.12	−6.45	16,271	47.95	
Green	Richard Suggate	1,455	4.34		1,967	5.80	
United Future	Vanessa Roberts	988	2.95		1,313	3.87	
NZ First	Brian Roswell	912	2.72		1,577	4.65	
ACT	Tetauru Emile	203	0.61		255	0.75	
Anti-Capitalist Alliance	Sam Kingi	69	0.21				
Alliance	Tom Dowie	61	0.21		55	0.16	
Economic Euthenics	Tubby Hansen	29	0.09				
Direct Democracy	Anton Foljambe	20	0.06		5	0.01	
Destiny					112	0.33	
Māori Party					90	0.27	
Legalise Cannabis					89	0.26	
Christian Heritage					52	0.15	
Libertarianz					22	0.06	
Democrats					15	0.04	
RONZ					8	0.02	
Family Rights					6	0.02	
One NZ					4	0.01	
99 MP					3	0.01	
Informal votes		716			728		
Total valid votes		33,519			33,930		
Progressive hold	Majority	8,548	25.50	+15.39			

=== 2002 election ===
2002 general election: Wigram
Notes:	Blue background denotes the winner of the electorate vote. Pink background denotes a candidate elected from their party list. Yellow background denotes an electorate win by a list member, or other incumbent. A ✓ or ✗ denotes status of any incumbent, win or lose respectively.						
Party	Candidate	Votes	%	±%	Party votes	%	±%
Progressive	✓ Jim Anderton	11,206	35.13		2,178	6.77	
Labour	Mike Mora	8,030	25.17		14,533	45.16	
National	Alec Neill	6,560	20,56		5,457	16.96	
Green	Paul de Spa	1,681	5.27		2,179	6.77	
United Future	Andrew Kubala	1,376	4.31		2,402	7.46	
ACT	Shirley Marshall	685	2.15		1,285	3.99	
PCP Coalition	BJ Anderson	657	2.06				
Alliance	Sean Gourley	581	1.82		611	1.90	
Christian Heritage	Stephen Dejong	576	1.81		497	1.54	
Economic Euthenics	Tubby Hansen	55	0.17				
NZ First					2,266	7.04	
ORNZ					366	1.14	
Legalise Cannabis					175	0.54	
One NZ					10	0.03	
Mana Māori					6	0.02	
NMP					4	0.01	
Informal votes		495			215		
Total valid votes		31,902			32,184		
Progressive gain from Alliance	Majority	3,176	9.96				

=== 1999 election ===
Refer to Candidates in the New Zealand general election 1999 by electorate#Wigram for a list of candidates.

=== 1996 election ===
1996 general election: Wigram
Notes:	Blue background denotes the winner of the electorate vote. Pink background denotes a candidate elected from their party list. Yellow background denotes an electorate win by a list member, or other incumbent. A ✓ or ✗ denotes status of any incumbent, win or lose respectively.						
Party	Candidate	Votes	%	±%	Party votes	%	±%
Alliance	✓ Jim Anderton	17,314	50.09		7,492	21.67	
National	Angus McKay	7,275	21.04		9,527	27.56	
Labour	Mick Ozimek	6,343	18.35		10,843	31.37	
NZ First	Nicci Bergman	1,827	5.28		2,627	7.60	
ACT	Stu Whyte	497	1.43		946	2.73	
United NZ	John Austin	340	0.98		321	0.92	
McGillicuddy Serious	Nick Harper	270	0.78		123	0.35	
Progressive Green	Jules Adams	182	0.52		100	0.28	
Natural Law	Warwick Jones	82	0.23		61	0.17	
Independent	Averil Tunridge	43	0.12				
Economic Euthenics	Tubby Hansen	16	0.04				
Dominion Workers	Clifford Mundy	16	0.04				
Christian Coalition					1,604	4.64	
Legalise Cannabis					636	1.84	
Animals First					77	0.22	
Ethnic Minority					17	0.04	
Green Society					10	0.02	
Superannuitants & Youth					10	0.02	
Mana Māori					8	0.02	
Advance NZ					6	0.01	
Conservatives					4	0.01	
Libertarianz					4	0.01	
Asia Pacific					3	0.01	
Te Tawharau					1	0.00	
Informal votes		356			141		
Total valid votes		34,561			34,561		

=== 1975 election ===
1975 general election: Wigram
Party	Candidate	Votes	%	±%
Labour	Mick Connelly	9,617	49.70	−13.04
National	Neil Russell	7,650	39.53	
Values	Karen Timpson	1,124	5.80	
Social Credit	Norm Davey	957	4.94	+0.01
Majority		1,967	10.16	−22.67
Turnout		19,348	84.54	−5.20
Registered electors		22,885		

=== 1972 election ===
1972 general election: Wigram
Party	Candidate	Votes	%	±%
Labour	Mick Connelly	10,040	62.74	+6.54
National	David Cox	4,785	29.90	
Social Credit	Norm Davey	790	4.93	
Values	Bruce Charles Lusher	318	1.98	
New Democratic	Frederick William Stevens	69	0.43	
Majority		5,255	32.83	+13.41
Turnout		16,002	89.74	+0.58
Registered electors		17,830		

=== 1969 election ===
1969 general election: Wigram
Party	Candidate	Votes	%	±%
Labour	Mick Connelly	9,258	56.20	
National	Dick Dawson	6,058	36.77	
Social Credit	Maurice McConnell	1,157	7.02	
Majority		3,200	19.42	
Turnout		16,473	89.16	
Registered electors		18,474		
