= Anthony Walton =

Anthony Walton may refer to:

- Anthony Walton (politician) (born 1962), former New Zealand political party president
- Anthony Walton (poet) (born 1960), American poet and writer
- Tony Walton (1934–2022), English set and costume designer
