= Christian Democrat Party (New Zealand) =

Defunct political party

The Christian Democrat Party of New Zealand was a Christian socially conservative political party established in 1995. It contested the 1996 general election as part of the Christian Coalition with the Christian Heritage Party.

It changed its name to Future New Zealand in 1998 and contested the 1999 election. It formed a coalition with the United Party as United Future New Zealand in 2000 and contested the 2002 election. The coalition became a full merger the following year.

== Founding and Christian Coalition ==

The Christian Democrats were founded by Graeme Lee, a National Party MP. Lee had a reputation as one of the more conservative MPs in Parliament, and was particularly active in opposing Fran Wilde's homosexual law reform bill. When the Christian Heritage Party, a strongly conservative group, was established, Lee initially rejected it, believing that it was better to work from within the National Party. Later, however, when he lost his ministerial rank in a Cabinet reshuffle, Lee decided to leave National. Although there were attempts to have him join Christian Heritage, Lee disagreed with many Christian Heritage policies. He instead established a group called the United Progressive Party. After a failed attempt to merge the United Progressive Party with Christian Heritage, it was relaunched on 17 May 1995 under the name "Christian Democrats".

Talks between the Christian Democrats and Christian Heritage continued, with many people believing that a united front was the only way for the Christian conservative movement to be successful. There were, however, significant policy differences between the two parties. One major problem was Christian Heritage's "confessional" nature, which meant that only Christians could join the party. Graeme Lee and the Christian Democrats, by contrast, preferred to make their party "values-based", saying that anyone who shared the basic Christian moral outlook (whether actually Christian or not) should be able to participate. The two parties also disagreed on a number of other points, with the Christian Democrats generally being more moderate than Christian Heritage.

Eventually, however, the two parties agreed to contest the 1996 election as a single bloc. The resultant Christian Coalition was announced on 29 March 1996. Throughout the existence of the Coalition, however, there were tensions between the two parties – the Christian Democrats accused Christian Heritage of extremism and inflexibility, while Christian Heritage accused the Christian Democrats of putting political pragmatism before Christian morality. The Coalition received 4.33% of the votes, a little short of the 5% which would have given it seats in Parliament, and it collapsed soon afterwards, with both sides accusing each other of having held the Coalition back.

== Future New Zealand and United Future ==
Shortly after the Coalition collapsed, Graeme Lee stepped down as leader of the Christian Democrats, having decided some time earlier to retire if the Coalition was not successful. After a considerable period of time, Anthony Walton was selected as the party's new leader. Walton took the party even further away from the confessionalism of Christian Heritage, abandoning the explicitly religious nature of the party in favour of a broader "values-based" platform. It changed its name to Future New Zealand in November 1998 and contested the 1999 election, gaining 1.12% of the votes and no seats.

Future New Zealand joined with the United Party to form a coalition known as United Future New Zealand in November 2000 and contested the 2002 election as such. The joint parties polled strongly, gaining eight seats in Parliament. The coalition became a full merger in 2003.

Only one founding member of the Christian Democrats, Murray Smith, became a United Future MP, so there has been debate as to how much of the Christian Democrats remained in the modern party. One side of this debate argues that United Future list MPs Larry Baldock, Bernie Ogilvy and Paul Adams all had involvement with evangelical organisations, such as Youth with a Mission, the Masters Institute in Auckland, and City Impact Church, and while they may not have been Christian Democrats, they were conservative Christian political activists and community figures before their entry to Parliament. Over and over again, United Future voted against socially liberal legislation in Parliament, or else supported socially conservative private members bills. These included the Prostitution Law Reform Act 2003, Care of Children Act 2004, Civil Union Act 2004, Relationships (Statutory References) Act 2005 and Death With Dignity Bill 2004, which they opposed. Murray Smith sponsored an unsuccessful private members bill which would have required parental notification before an abortion could be performed, which did not pass. Although a conservative Catholic, Gordon Copeland has frequently cited the work of organisations such as the Society for Promotion of Community Standards and Right to Life New Zealand as a basis for comments against the Prostitution Law Reform Act, and himself introduced an attempt to ban same-sex marriage into the 48th New Zealand Parliament on 7 December 2005.

In February 2006, Copeland submitted an anti-abortion private members ballot bill into the 48th Parliament, entitled the Contraception, Sterilisation and Abortion (Informed Consent) Bill. This bill would ensure that women give informed consent before undergoing an abortion of their unborn child.

=== Electoral results ===
Election	Party	# of party votes	# of party vote	# of seats won	Government/opposition?
1996	Christian Coalition	89,716	4.33	0 / 120	Not in Parliament
1999	Future NZ	23,033	1.12	0 / 120	Not in Parliament
2002	United Future	135,918	6.69	8 / 120	Supporting Labour-led government
2005	United Future	60,860	2.67	3 / 120	Supporting Labour-led government
2008	United Future	20,497	0.87	1 / 120	Supporting National government
2011	United Future	13,443	0.60	1 / 120	Supporting National government
2014	United Future	4,533	0.22	1 / 120	Supporting National government
2017	United Future	1,782	0.07	0 / 120	Not in Parliament

== See also ==
- Christian politics in New Zealand
- The Kiwi Party
- Contraception, Sterilisation, and Abortion Act 1977
