= Crimes (Substituted Section 59) Amendment Act 2007 =

New Zealand law concerning corporal punishment

New Zealand Parliament
- Royal assent: 21 May 2007
- Commenced: 21 June 2007

Legislative history
- Introduced by: Sue Bradford
- Passed: 16 May 2007

Related legislation
- Crimes Act 1961
- Status: In force

The Crimes (Substituted Section 59) Amendment Act 2007 (formerly the Crimes (Abolition of Force as a Justification for Child Discipline) Amendment Bill) is an amendment to New Zealand's Crimes Act 1961 which removed the legal defence of "reasonable force" for parents prosecuted for assault on their children.

The law was introduced to the New Zealand Parliament as a member's bill by Green Party Member of Parliament Sue Bradford in 2005, after being drawn from the ballot. It attracted intense debate, both in Parliament and from the public. The bill was colloquially referred to by several of its opponents and newspapers as the "anti-smacking bill". The bill was passed on its third reading on 16 May 2007 by 113 votes to eight. The Governor-General of New Zealand granted the Royal Assent on 21 May 2007, and the law came into effect on 21 June 2007.

A citizens-initiated referendum on the issues surrounding the law was held between 30 July and 21 August 2009, asking "Should a smack as part of good parental correction be a criminal offence in New Zealand?" Despite widespread criticism of the question's wording, the referendum was returned with an 87.4 percent "No" vote on a turnout of 56.1 percent.

== Legal context ==
Prior to the amendment bill, Section 59 read as follows:

59 Domestic discipline
(1) Every parent of a child and, subject to subsection (3), every person in the place of the parent of a child is justified in using force by way of correction towards the child, if the force used is reasonable in the circumstances.
(2) The reasonableness of the force used is a question of fact.
(3) Nothing in subsection (1) justifies the use of force towards a child in contravention of section 139A of the Education Act 1989.

Section 139A of the Education Act 1989 is the enactment criminalising school corporal punishment, so the third clause prohibited teacher-parents from using force on their own children if it could be interpreted as school corporal punishment.

Section 59 reads as follows:

59 Parental control
(1) Every parent of a child and every person in the place of a parent of the child is justified in using force if the force used is reasonable in the circumstances and is for the purpose of—

(a) preventing or minimising harm to the child or another person; or
(b) preventing the child from engaging or continuing to engage in conduct that amounts to a criminal offence; or
(c) preventing the child from engaging or continuing to engage in offensive or disruptive behaviour; or
(d) performing the normal daily tasks that are incidental to good care and parenting.

(2) Nothing in subsection (1) or in any rule of common law justifies the use of force for the purpose of correction.
(3) Subsection (2) prevails over subsection (1).
(4) To avoid doubt, it is affirmed that the Police have the discretion not to prosecute complaints against a parent of a child or person in the place of a parent of a child in relation to an offence involving the use of force against a child, where the offence is considered to be so inconsequential that there is no public interest in proceeding with a prosecution.

Adults assaulting children no longer have the legal defence of "reasonable force" but "force ... may ... be for the purposes of restraint ... or, by way of example, to ensure compliance", according to the police practice guide.

== Social context ==
Prior to the amendment of section 59 of the Crimes Act 1961, there were cases of parents who had disciplined their children using a riding crop in one case, and a rubber hose in another, who were not convicted because of the legal justification of "reasonable force". When the law was changed in 2007, some proponents of the change said it would stop cases of abuse from slipping through the gaps and reduce the infant death rate.

Discussion about removing or amending section 59, however, predate the bill's introduction. In September 1993, the Children's Commissioner, Dr Ian Hassall, publicly called for the repeal of the “reasonable force” defence. He argued that smacking was ineffective and unjust, and noted that several European countries had already prohibited physical punishment of children.

== Political context ==
When the member's bill was first proposed by Sue Bradford in 2005, it was known as the Crimes (Abolition of Force as a Justification for Child Discipline) Amendment Bill. It was subsequently renamed to the Crimes (Substituted Section 59) Amendment Bill at the Select Committee stage. The bill was later backed by the Labour Party and for a time it 'faced a rocky passage through parliament with the main opposition party, National, giving its members a conscience vote on the issue'. A new section, Clause 4, was added as part of a political agreement with the Leader of the Opposition, John Key, and the amendment passed by 113 votes to 8 with both major parties voting for the bill.

== Debate and aftermath ==
Bradford considered that smacking was illegal even before the Act was passed. When an illegal activity is reported to the Police or to Child Youth and Family (CYF), they are required to investigate the reported abuse. Under subsection 4, The police have the option of not prosecuting the parents 'where the offence is considered to be so inconsequential that there is no public interest in proceeding with a prosecution.'

Many of the groups who originally supported the change to the Act also said that a law change was not a fully adequate response to protect children from abuse. The New Zealand Anglican Bishops said 'It is essential that changes to section 59 go hand in hand with increased access to high quality public educational programmes, which encourage non-violent discipline and child rearing.' The United Nations Committee on the Rights of the Child (UNCRC) also put pressure on the New Zealand Government for education and promotion of changing attitudes and parenting practice.

In the 2008 Budget the then Labour Government said it was 'providing $446.5 million over the next four years to improve our partnership with community-based social services to help deliver essential services to support children and families, including parenting and family violence programmes, and mentoring at-risk youth.' This included the "Are you OK?" anti-family-violence campaign.

The law change has been described by supporters as aimed at making 'Aotearoa New Zealand […] a place where children are secure, confident, understand limits and boundaries and behave well – without physical punishment' and to 'protect children from assault'.

The first conviction under the new law occurred on 22 November 2007. In the first five years following the law change (June 2007 – June 2012) there were eight prosecutions for smacking.

== Reactions and opinions ==
A broad selection of organisations – including child welfare groups, churches, women's groups and businesses – publicly endorsed the bill and made submissions in support of it.

Gordon Copeland resigned from the United Future party over the bill since he did not agree with the party leader Peter Dunne's support for it. However, Copeland was not re-elected to Parliament at the New Zealand general election, 2008, although his political vehicle, The Kiwi Party, made that issue paramount in its election campaign.

Most public opposition to the bill came from conservative Christian groups, who believed that it made even "light smacking" of children illegal. Multipartisan passage of the bill occurred after an additional clause was added stating that the bill did not remove police discretion on whether to prosecute in "inconsequential" cases when it was not in the public interest to do so.

During debate on the bill a poster on the CYFSWatch website threatened Bradford. Google removed the website from its Blogger service soon afterwards.

A survey carried out between May and June 2008 showed that more people supported the Act than those who did not. The survey, carried out by UMR Research for the Office of the Children's Commissioner, polled 750 people, of whom 91% were aware of the law change and 72% professed to know "a lot" or "a fair amount" about the legislation.

Results of the questions were:

- 89% of respondents agreed that children are entitled to the same protection from assault as adults. 4% disagreed and 5% were neutral.
- 43% supported the law regarding physical punishment of children, 28% opposed and 26% were neutral.
- 58% agreed there are certain circumstances when parents may physically punish children. 20% disagreed with the hypothesis and 20% were neutral.
- 30% agreed that physical punishment should be part of child discipline. 37% disagreed and 32% were unsure.

== Referendum proposals ==
Two petitions for citizens initiated referendums related to the bill were launched in February 2007. The wording for the two referendums was:

"Should a smack as part of good parental correction be a criminal offence in New Zealand?"
"Should the Government give urgent priority to understanding and addressing the wider causes of family breakdown, family violence and child abuse in New Zealand?"

In February 2008, the bill having been passed in the meantime, supporters of the referendums claimed that they had collected enough signatures. If 300,000 valid signatures were collected by 1 March 2008 for each of the referendum petitions, they hoped the referendums would be held on the same date as the 2008 general election.

The first petition was supported by Family First New Zealand, the ACT Party and The Kiwi Party.

The first petition was presented to the Clerk of the House of Representatives on 29 February 2008, who vetted the signatures along with the Chief Electoral Officer. Of 280,275 signatures required to force a referendum, only 269,500 were confirmed—a shortfall of 10,775. A number of signatures were excluded because they were illegible, had incorrect date of birth information, or appeared more than once.

The petitioners were required to collect and confirm the requisite number of signatures within two months, to be presented to the Speaker of the House of Representatives. This occurred on 23 June 2008, when Kiwi Party leader Larry Baldock handed over a petition which claimed to have over 390,000 signatures. The Office of the Clerk of the House had two months to verify the signatures.

On 22 August 2008 the Clerk certified that there were enough signatures, and the Government had one month to name a date for a referendum. Under the Citizens Initiated Referenda Act 1993, Cabinet could delay a vote on the issue for up to a year. The referendum was held from 31 July to 21 August 2009.

The referendum was non-binding (as specified by New Zealand's Citizens Initiated Referenda Act 1993), and thus did not compel the government to follow its result. Prime Minister John Key and Leader of the Opposition Phil Goff said the results of the referendum would not commit them to repealing the law.

On 25 August 2009, the Chief Electoral Officer released the results of the referendum. According to the results, 11.98% of valid votes were Yes votes, and 87.4% of votes were No votes. Voter turnout was 56.09%, and 0.1% of votes were invalid.

The second petition, organised by Larry Baldock, was handed to Parliament on 14 May 2008.

=== 2017 election ===
New Zealand First and Winston Peters said they would take a policy to repeal the law to the 2017 election. However, during the post-election negotiations with the Labour Party, NZ First agreed to drop its demand for a referendum on this law.

== See also ==
- Child discipline
- New Zealand blogosphere#CYFS Watch
- Convention on the Rights of the Child
