= 2009 New Zealand child discipline referendum =

Non-binding referendum in New Zealand

- 31 July – 21 August 2009
- "Should a smack as part of good parental correction be a criminal offence in New Zealand?"

Results
Choice	Votes	%
Yes	201,541	12.05%
No	1,470,755	87.95%
Valid votes	1,672,296	99.28%
Invalid or blank votes	12,106	0.72%
Total votes	1,684,402	100.00%
Registered voters/turnout	3,002,968	56.09%
- Results by electorate

The 2009 New Zealand Referendum on Child Discipline was held from 31 July to 21 August, and was a citizens-initiated referendum on parental corporal punishment. It asked:

Should a smack as part of good parental correction be a criminal offence in New Zealand?

Voter turnout was 56.1%. 87.4% of votes answered 'no'. The result of the referendum was non-binding and the New Zealand government did not change the law in response to the outcome.

== Background ==
The petition for the referendum was launched in February 2007 in response to the Crimes (Substituted Section 59) Amendment Bill, which would remove parental correction as a defence for assault against children. The petition was organised by Sheryl Savill with support from Kiwi Party's Larry Baldock. The wording of the petition was approved by Clerk of the House David McGee on 21 February 2007.

The bill, introduced by Sue Bradford, was passed its third reading in Parliament by 113 votes to 7 on 16 May 2007. Meanwhile organisations and individuals led by Larry Baldock continued to collect signatures to initiate a referendum. They fell short by about 15,500 signatures (many were invalid), and they were granted two further months to make up the difference. Eventually the petition attracted 310,000 signatures from voters, surpassing the 285,000 signatures, or 10 per cent of total voters, required to force a referendum.

In June 2008, then prime minister Helen Clark announced that the referendum would not take place alongside the 2008 election as the organisers had been hoping. The decision was based on advice from the chief electoral officer that holding such a referendum could lead to voter confusion. Instead, a postal ballot was selected, starting 30 July 2009 for eligible voters and closing on 21 August 2009.

In June 2009, then Prime Minister John Key said that the government would change the law if it was not working, but that he believed the current law was working well.

== Criticism regarding question wording ==
The wording of citizens-initiated referendum questions was ultimately the responsibility of the Clerk of the House of Representatives, David McGee. Under the referendum legislation, the wording of the question is required to "convey clearly the purpose and effect" of the referendum.

[The question] "could have been written by Dr Seuss – this isn't Green Eggs and Ham, this is yes means no and no means yes, but we're all meant to understand what the referendum means. I think it's ridiculous myself."

— Prime Minister John Key,

The referendum question was interpreted by some to be a loaded question. Murray Edridge, chief executive of Barnardos New Zealand, claimed that the question "presupposes that smacking is part of good parental correction" which he described as "a debatable issue". Prime Minister John Key described the question as "ambiguous" and pointed out that it "could be read a number of different ways". Leader of the Opposition Phil Goff expressed concern that the question "implies that if you vote 'yes' that [sic] you're in favour of criminal sanctions being taken against reasonable parents – actually nobody believes that."

Both John Key and Phil Goff stated that they did not intend to vote in the referendum, with Key calling the question "ridiculous". The Prime Minister believed turnout would be low.

Sue Bradford introduced a member's bill, the Citizens Initiated Referenda (Wording of Questions) Amendment Bill, designed to prevent future citizens-initiated referenda from having poorly worded questions, and the National government considered adopting it.

On this bill, she wrote:

An example of an approved referendum question that is both leading and misleading is the NZ Referendum on Child Discipline 2009 proposed by Larry Baldock.

The question approved for that referendum "Should a smack as part of good parental correction be a criminal offence in New Zealand?" is leading in that the use of the word "good" before "parental correction" makes a value-judgment which predetermines the answer. People answering the question will be drawn to answer "no" on the basis that what is "good" cannot be criminal.

Caritas Aotearoa New Zealand has made this argument:

Mr Smith says the upcoming referendum will not provide clarity on the question of child discipline, because it is possible to support the 2007 amendment while voting either Yes or No to the referendum question: Should a smack as part of good parental correction be a criminal offence in New Zealand?

However, Caritas recognises that in the political context of the referendum, a 'Yes' vote is seen to be a vote for the status quo, while a 'No' vote is seen to be a vote against the 2007 amendment.

"In this context, we recommend a 'Yes' vote, as we believe the status quo is close to the position that we recommended to the Select Committee. However, the wording of the question is so ambiguous, many New Zealanders who support efforts to reduce violence against children, may in good conscience still feel obliged to vote 'No'. It will be hard to understand what the outcome of the referendum may mean," says Mr Smith.

He says Caritas will be writing to the Prime Minister and other relevant politicians, expressing concern that the ambiguous nature of the question will result in an outcome that cannot be understood as either supporting or opposing the 2007 amendment.

== Campaigns ==
=== The "yes" campaign ===
Most front-line child welfare organisations, such as Plunket Society, Barnardos, Save the Children, Unicef, Women's Refuge, CPAG, Epoch and Jigsaw, believed the referendum question was misleading, and encouraged their supporters to vote "yes". These organisations, along with many others, backed "The Yes Vote" campaign. Māori Party co-leader Pita Sharples and Green Party co-leader Russel Norman wanted the current law retained, with Norman adding he would vote Yes.

=== The "no" campaign ===
The "Vote NO" campaign website was launched on 22 June 2009. The campaign was supported by Simon Barnett. ACT leader Rodney Hide said he would vote no, believing parents have the right to lightly smack their children. Family First and The Kiwi Party also supported voting 'no'.

== Results ==
=== Nationwide ===
New Zealand citizens-initiated referendum, 2009
Choice	Votes	%
For	201,541	12.05
Against	1,470,755	87.95
Total	1,672,296	100.00
Valid votes	1,672,296	99.28
Invalid/blank votes	12,106	0.72
Total votes	1,684,402	100.00
Registered voters/turnout	3,002,968	56.09

=== By electorate ===
Electorate	Party holding seat	Yes ✓ (%)	Yes ✓ (num)	No ✗ (%)	No ✗ (num)	Informal votes	Invalid votes	Turnout
Total		11.98	201,541	87.40	1,470,755	10,421	1,685	56.09
Auckland Central	National	29.20	5,898	69.69	14,075	223	14	45.78
Bay of Plenty	National	7.32	2,210	92.27	27,844	122	9	66.75
Botany	National	9.13	2,206	90.49	21,874	93	8	57.04
Christchurch Central	Labour	16.63	3,476	82.66	17,283	149	60	50.22
Christchurch East	Labour	10.87	2,751	88.59	22,418	136	66	58.97
Clutha-Southland	National	7.25	1,942	92.39	24,754	97	34	62.94
Coromandel	National	8.32	2,490	91.25	27,307	130	5	66.16
Dunedin North	Labour	19.86	4,065	79.02	16,173	230	10	50.54
Dunedin South	Labour	11.51	3,243	87.74	24,729	213	22	62.32
East Coast	National	8.84	2,130	90.72	21,859	106	26	59.32
East Coast Bays	National	10.24	2,742	89.24	23,907	141	17	59.63
Epsom	ACT	18.74	4,752	80.37	20,384	228	10	52.71
Hamilton East	National	13.41	3,169	85.82	20,276	182	14	55.14
Hamilton West	National	9.78	2,365	89.80	21,710	102	14	55.38
Helensville	National	9.19	2,574	90.41	25,327	114	17	61.12
Hunua	National	7.19	1,963	92.38	25,223	119	13	63.17
Hutt South	Labour	15.60	3,527	83.64	18,912	173	45	53.01
Ilam	National	15.15	3,832	84.00	21,242	214	76	55.89
Invercargill	National	7.55	2,023	92.09	24,685	97	6	60.13
Kaikōura	National	8.42	2,407	90.95	26,008	181	15	64.95
Mana	Labour	16.86	3,738	82.31	18,251	185		51.75
Māngere	Labour	17.15	2,432	82.33	11,677	74		38.49
Manukau East	Labour	15.81	2,532	83.63	13,396	91		40.47
Manurewa	Labour	11.87	1,946	87.70	14,376	70		44.25
Maungakiekie	National	15.73	3,567	83.72	18,985	125		50.41
Mount Albert	Labour	23.08	4,898	75.92	16,112	212		47.83
Mount Roskill	Labour	13.91	3,132	85.57	19,274	117		50.38
Napier	National	9.34	2,514	90.12	24,251	146		61.42
Nelson	National	15.33	4,122	83.95	22,572	192		59.47
New Lynn	Labour	15.66	3,799	83.66	20,294	164		54.65
New Plymouth	National	8.73	2,351	90.81	24,446	124		60.25
North Shore	National	14.78	4,153	84.45	23,736	217		58.79
Northcote	National	13.84	3,447	85.39	21,268	191		55.57
Northland	National	8.74	2,390	90.67	24,805	163		63.23
Ōhariu	United Future	19.88	4,980	78.97	19,779	288		54.85
Ōtaki	National	10.56	3,035	88.71	25,487	209		61.82
Pakuranga	National	9.47	2,608	90.12	24,814	113		60.91
Palmerston North	Labour	11.74	2,917	87.40	21,718	215		57.44
Papakura	National	8.44	2,037	91.15	22,006	99		57.57
Port Hills	Labour	18.29	4,616	80.66	20,354	263		56.77
Rangitata	National	7.59	2,320	92.02	28,118	119		64.45
Rangitīkei	National	8.05	2,127	91.42	24,153	140		63.82
Rimutaka	Labour	11.75	2,926	87.68	21,830	141		57.24
Rodney	National	8.96	2,735	90.50	27,621	164		66.09
Rongotai	Labour	29.34	6,370	69.43	15,073	267		47.64
Rotorua	National	7.86	1,990	91.66	23,209	123		59.81
Selwyn	National	10.12	2,928	89.30	25,832	168		65.23
Tāmaki	National	14.47	3,910	84.74	22,906	214		56.96
Taranaki-King Country	National	7.26	1,907	92.41	24,267	86		64.36
Taupō	National	7.29	2,033	92.30	25,723	113		61.84
Tauranga	National	8.54	2,515	90.99	26,789	139		63.85
Te Atatū	National	10.89	2,480	88.64	20,193	109		54.45
Tukituki	National	9.45	2,530	90.03	24,116	140		60.71
Waikato	National	7.00	1,832	92.54	24,215	120		64.46
Waimakariri	Labour	7.97	2,355	91.61	27,071	125		64.33
Wairarapa	National	8.60	2,456	90.79	25,920	174		62.65
Waitakere	National	12.40	2,706	87.07	19,007	116		53.89
Waitaki	National	7.63	2,434	91.76	29,277	196		65.90
Wellington Central	Labour	36.04	7,697	61.94	13,229	432		44.04
West Coast-Tasman	National	11.72	3,171	87.67	23,716	164		62.84
Whanganui	National	8.12	2,159	91.44	24,303	115		60.83
Whangarei	National	9.17	2,572	90.32	25,337	143		61.60
Wigram	Progressive	12.42	3,023	86.89	21,150	167		54.39
Hauraki-Waikato	Labour	10.71	1,188	88.86	9,854			34.36
Ikaroa-Rāwhiti	Labour	10.10	1,194	89.40	10,573			36.14
Tāmaki Makaurau	Māori	12.21	1,481	87.22	10,579			34.15
Te Tai Hauāuru	Māori	11.17	1,362	88.25	10,758			37.36
Te Tai Tokerau	Māori	10.70	1,344	88.77	11,148			37.87
Te Tai Tonga	Māori	14.40	1,791	85.40	10,580			38.86
Waiariki	Māori	8.77	1,026	90.77	10,617			36.58

== Aftermath ==
=== Government response ===
Prime Minister John Key promised to bring forward the planned review of the law.

=== John Boscawen's member's bill ===
By coincidence, Government coalition and ACT MP John Boscawen had a member's bill legalising smacking drawn from the ballot less than a week after the referendum. Prime Minister John Key said his National Party would vote it down, with the Labour Party and Green Party also opposed making it likely to be lost after the first reading of the bill. In September 2010 the Bill was in fact defeated 115–5 on its first reading in Parliament.

=== Binding referendum ===
Dissatisfied with the government's response, the Kiwi Party has put forward another referendum to make referendums legally binding. The question "Should Parliament be required to pass legislation that implements the majority result of a citizens initiated referendum where that result supports a law change?" was approved by the Clerk of the House on 17 December 2009. However, the petition failed to gain sufficient signatures and subsequently lapsed.

=== Public protests ===
A protest against prime minister John Key's response to the referendum was held on Saturday, 21 November 2009 in Auckland. The New Zealand Herald estimated that between 4,000 and 5,000 people attended.

=== 2017 election ===
On 24 March 2017 it was reported that New Zealand First and Winston Peters would take to the election a policy of repealing the anti-smacking law passed by the last parliament despite overwhelming public opposition. They went on to state that they would not enter any coalition or confidence and supply agreement with a party that wished to ignore the public's clearly stated view in a referendum on that issue after the 2017 New Zealand general election. New Zealand First went into government following the election and no changes were made to the law.

== Opinion polls ==
Note: Percentage figures are rounded.

Source	Date	Sample	✓ Yes	✗ No	Don't know/won't vote
TVNZ/Colmar Brunton	3 August 2009	1000	13%	83%	5%

== See also ==
- Crimes Act 1961, the Act that was amended
- Crimes (Substituted Section 59) Amendment Act 2007 the amending Act
- Crime in New Zealand
- Corporal punishment in the home
