= 1996 Speaker of the New Zealand House of Representatives election =

← 1923	12 December 1996	2002 →
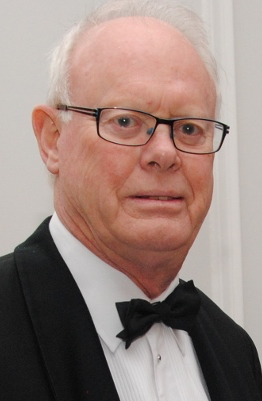

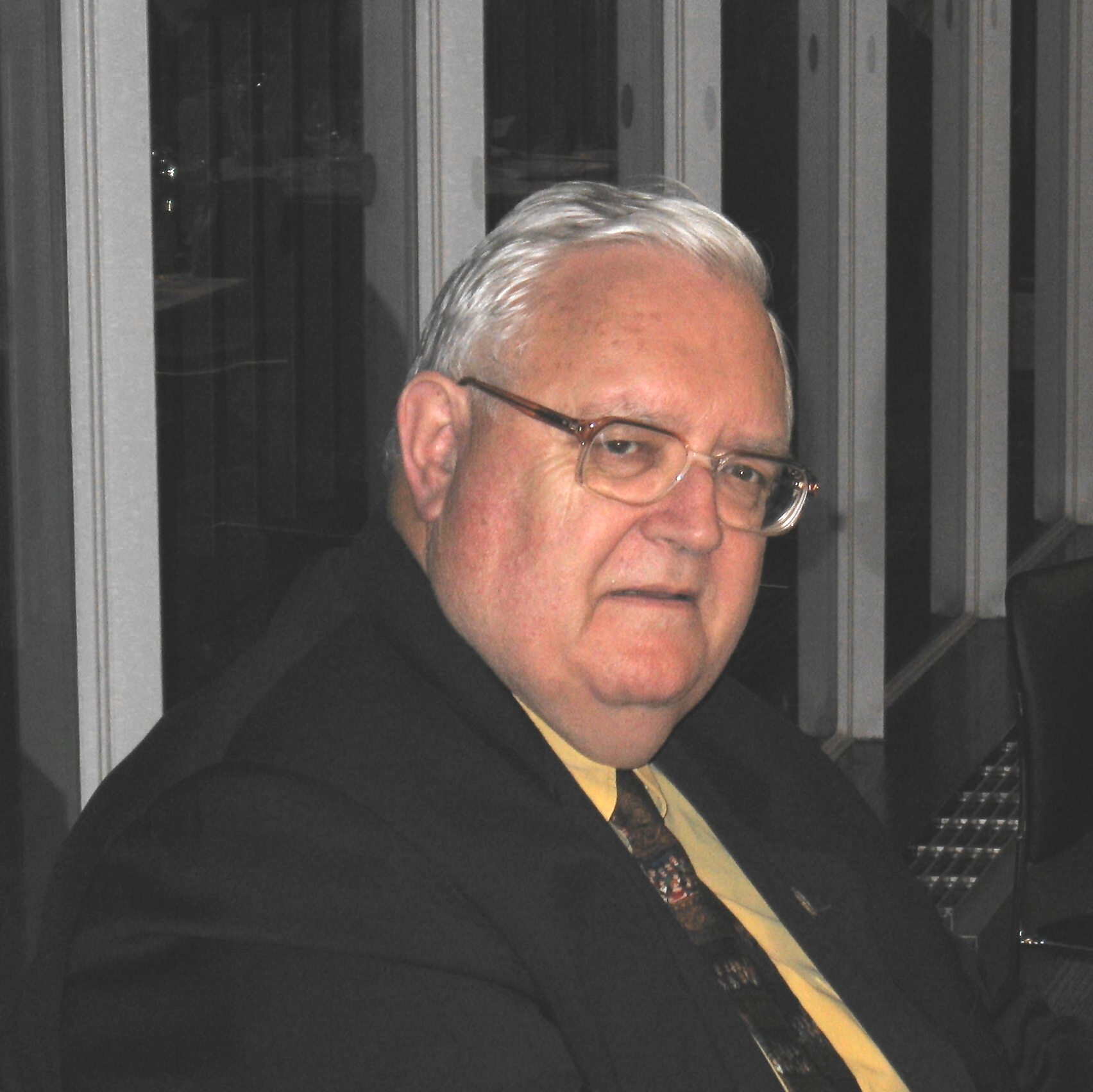
Candidate	Doug Kidd	Jonathan Hunt
Party	National	Labour
Popular vote	70	50
Percentage	58.33	41.66
Speaker before election
Peter Tapsell
Labour
Elected Speaker
Doug Kidd
National

The 1996 election of the Speaker of the New Zealand House of Representatives occurred on 12 December 1996, following the 1996 general election result. The election saw the incumbent speaker Peter Tapsell lose his parliamentary seat. It resulted in the election of National Party MP Doug Kidd as Speaker. It was the first time a vote for speaker had been contested since 1923.

== Nominated candidates ==
Two candidates were nominated:

- Rt Hon Jonathan Hunt, List MP – Labour Party
- Hon Doug Kidd, MP for Kaikoura – National Party

Derek Quigley, the deputy leader of the ACT Party, also intended to stand as a candidate but ultimately did not put forward his name for nomination.

== Election ==
The election was conducted by means of a conventional parliamentary motion. The Clerk of the House of Representatives conducted a vote on the question of the election of the Speaker, in accordance with Standing Order 19.

The following table gives the election results:

Party	Candidate	Votes	%
National	Doug Kidd	70	58.33
Labour	Jonathan Hunt	50	41.66
Majority		20	16.66
Turnout		120	—

How each MP voted:

Party	Name	Speaker Vote
National	Arthur Anae	Kidd
Alliance	Jim Anderton	Hunt
ACT	Donna Awatere Huata	Kidd
National	John Banks	Kidd
Labour	Rick Barker	Hunt
Labour	Tim Barnett	Hunt
NZ First	Ann Batten	Kidd
National	Bill Birch	Kidd
NZ First	Jenny Bloxham	Kidd
National	Jim Bolger	Kidd
National	Max Bradford	Kidd
Labour	Geoff Braybrooke	Hunt
NZ First	Peter Brown	Kidd
National	Gerry Brownlee	Kidd
Alliance	Phillida Bunkle	Hunt
Labour	Mark Burton	Hunt
National	David Carter	Kidd
National	John Carter	Kidd
Labour	Helen Clark	Hunt
Alliance	Pam Corkery	Hunt
National	Wyatt Creech	Kidd
Labour	Michael Cullen	Hunt
Labour	Lianne Dalziel	Hunt
NZ First	Tuariki Delamere	Kidd
Alliance	Rod Donald	Hunt
NZ First	Brian Donnelly	Kidd
United NZ	Peter Dunne	Kidd
Labour	Harry Duynhoven	Hunt
Labour	Ruth Dyson	Hunt
National	Paul East	Kidd
NZ First	Jack Elder	Kidd
National	Bill English	Kidd
Labour	Taito Phillip Field	Hunt
Alliance	Jeanette Fitzsimons	Hunt
National	Christine Fletcher	Kidd
National	Jim Gerard	Kidd
Alliance	Grant Gillon	Hunt
Labour	Phil Goff	Hunt
Alliance	Liz Gordon	Hunt
Labour	Mark Gosche	Hunt
National	Doug Graham	Kidd
National	Peter Gresham	Kidd
Alliance	Frank Grover	Hunt
Alliance	Laila Harré	Hunt
National	Marie Hasler	Kidd
Labour	Joe Hawke	Hunt
Labour	George Hawkins	Hunt
NZ First	Tau Henare	Kidd
National	Gavan Herlihy	Kidd
ACT	Rodney Hide	Kidd
Labour	Marian Hobbs	Hunt
Labour	Pete Hodgson	Hunt
Labour	Jonathan Hunt	Hunt
ACT	Owen Jennings	Kidd
Labour	Judy Keall	Hunt
Labour	Graham Kelly	Hunt
National	Doug Kidd	Kidd
Labour	Annette King	Hunt
NZ First	Neil Kirton	Kidd
Alliance	Alamein Kopu	Hunt
National	Warren Kyd	Kidd
Alliance	Sandra Lee	Hunt
National	John Luxton	Kidd
Labour	Janet Mackey	Hunt
Labour	Steve Maharey	Hunt
Labour	Nanaia Mahuta	Hunt
Labour	Trevor Mallard	Hunt
National	Wayne Mapp	Kidd
NZ First	Ron Mark	Kidd
National	Denis Marshall	Kidd
National	Roger Maxwell	Kidd
NZ First	Peter McCardle	Kidd
National	Murray McCully	Kidd
NZ First	Robyn McDonald	Kidd
National	Don McKinnon	Kidd
National	Joy McLauchlan	Kidd
National	Murray McLean	Kidd
Labour	Mike Moore	Hunt
NZ First	Tuku Morgan	Kidd
NZ First	Deborah Morris	Kidd
National	Brian Neeson	Kidd
ACT	Muriel Newman	Kidd
Labour	Damien O'Connor	Hunt
National	Katherine O'Regan	Kidd
Labour	Mark Peck	Hunt
NZ First	Winston Peters	Kidd
Labour	Jill Pettis	Hunt
ACT	Richard Prebble	Kidd
ACT	Derek Quigley	Kidd
National	Ian Revell	Kidd
Labour	Ross Robertson	Hunt
Alliance	Matt Robson	Hunt
National	Eric Roy	Kidd
National	Tony Ryall	Kidd
Labour	Dover Samuels	Hunt
ACT	Patricia Schnauer	Kidd
National	Jenny Shipley	Kidd
ACT	Ken Shirley	Kidd
National	Bob Simcock	Kidd
National	Clem Simich	Kidd
National	Lockwood Smith	Kidd
National	Nick Smith	Kidd
National	Roger Sowry	Kidd
National	Tony Steel	Kidd
Labour	Larry Sutherland	Hunt
Labour	Jim Sutton	Hunt
Labour	Paul Swain	Hunt
National	Georgina te Heuheu	Kidd
Labour	Judith Tizard	Hunt
Labour	Tariana Turia	Hunt
National	Simon Upton	Kidd
National	Belinda Vernon	Kidd
NZ First	Rana Waitai	Kidd
Labour	Jill White	Hunt
National	Maurice Williamson	Kidd
National	Pansy Wong	Kidd
NZ First	Doug Woolerton	Kidd
Alliance	John Wright	Hunt
NZ First	Tu Wyllie	Kidd
Labour	Dianne Yates	Hunt

Ian Revell was elected deputy speaker on 13 December by 61 votes to 58 over Jonathan Hunt. National and New Zealand First voted for Revell with Labour, the Alliance and ACT voting for Hunt.
