= Bernie Ogilvy =

New Zealand educator and politician

Member of the New Zealand Parliament for United Future list
- In office 27 July 2002 – 17 September 2005

Personal details
- Party: Kiwi
- Other political affiliations: United Future New Zealand

Bernard James Ogilvy is a New Zealand educator and politician. He was a list member of Parliament (MP) for the United Future New Zealand party from 2002 to 2005. He left United Future with the breakaway Kiwi Party in 2007.

== Early years ==
Before entering national politics, Ogilvy lectured at Auckland's Masters Institute, a fundamentalist Christian teachers college, as well as being involved with Youth With A Mission.

== Member of Parliament ==
New Zealand Parliament
Years	Term	Electorate	List	Party
2002–2005	47th	List	3	United Future

He was elected to the New Zealand Parliament as a list MP for the United Future party in the 2002 general election. Controversy arose when the media reported that he had been using the title "Doctor" on the basis of an honorary degree awarded by a Californian theological school for his volunteer work at the 1984 Olympic Games. Like his colleagues, Murray Smith, Paul Adams and Larry Baldock, Ogilvy was an evangelical or fundamentalist Christian. Like the above, and Marc Alexander, he lost his seat at the 2005 general election when the party's electoral support fell to one third its previous level.

== Later years ==
Ogilvy reappeared as secretary of the new Kiwi Party in 2007, after Gordon Copeland seceded from United Future over Peter Dunne's support for Sue Bradford's child discipline bill, which sought to outlaw most forms of parental corporal punishment of children in New Zealand. Ogilvy made the application to register the Kiwi Party with the Electoral Commission.
