= Kelly Chal =

New Zealand politician

Kelly Chal is a former New Zealand politician. She was a candidate for the United Future party at the 2002 general election. Although Chal was declared elected in the provisional result of the election, it was later determined she was ineligible by not being a New Zealand citizen.

== Early life and family ==
Chal was born in India to a Sikh father and a Christian mother. She herself is Christian and has been a member of the Destiny Church. Te Ara - The Encyclopedia of New Zealand describes her as "an Indian-born Englishwoman who had not taken out New Zealand citizenship." In New Zealand, prior to her political campaign, she worked as a case manager for the Accident Compensation Corporation and as a career counsellor.

She is married with four children.

== Political career ==
Chal joined the United Future party four months before the 2002 election. She put her name forward to be a candidate and was selected for the Manukau East electorate and ranked fifth on the party list.

United Future won nine seats in the provisional result released shortly after the election on 27 July. With her high list placing, Chal was expected to be elected as a list MP—one of eight first-term members for the party. After the election, however, it emerged that Chal could not legally stand for election, as she lacked New Zealand citizenship. Chal was informed of this on 9 August. Despite an attempt to urgently gain citizenship, she was told she needed to hold citizenship on nomination day and this could not be retrospectively applied. As a result, she withdrew her nomination for the party list, allowing Paul Adams to be elected in her place. (Adams had also been declared elected in the provisional result, but would not have been entitled to a seat in the final result without Chal's withdrawal, because United Future's proportion of the vote dropped slightly between the two results.) Chal was not listed as a successful candidate in the official result of the election on 15 August.

It was suggested that legal action might be taken against Chal, as she had signed a declaration that she was eligible to stand. The authorities eventually decided, however, that Chal had made an honest mistake. Chal did not contest the 2005 election.
