= The Family Party =

- Leader: Richard Lewis
- President: Elias Kanaris
- Deputy: Paul Adams
- Founded: 17 December 2007
- Dissolved: 29 April 2010
- Ideology: Christian-based social conservatism Familialism
- Colours: Black, Yellow

The Family Party was a political party in New Zealand. It described itself as a Christian party.

== History ==
The Family Party was established by members of the disbanding Destiny New Zealand (the political party backed by the Destiny Church) and by Paul Adams, a former United Future MP and pastor within the Pentecostal City Impact Church, run by New Zealand televangelist Peter Mortlock. It was intended that they would join forces with Gordon Copeland, another former United Future MP then sitting as an independent, but talks fell through, and Copeland and another former United Future List MP, Larry Baldock established The Kiwi Party There was speculation that Taito Phillip Field might also be involved, but he formed another political party to target evangelical Christian Pacific Island immigrants in South Auckland, known as the New Zealand Pacific Party. Formation of the Family Party was announced in October 2007, and it was registered on 17 December, although its proposed logo was rejected because it used orange as the primary colour, a colour reserved for use exclusively by the Electoral Commission.

The party described its support base as "pro-family, traditional Christian" voters, and said that it would target Maori and Pacific Islander voters in South Auckland.

Richard Lewis, the former leader of Destiny New Zealand, was the Family Party's leader, while Adams was deputy leader. The party president was Elias Kanaris.

== 2008 election results ==
The Family Party did not gain electoral representation as a result of their contests in the 2008 general election. According to the New Zealand Electoral Commission website, it polled a total of 8176 votes altogether, to poll a final total party vote of only 0.35%. This placed them behind the "joke" Bill and Ben Party, The Kiwi Party and Aotearoa Legalise Cannabis Party, and on a par with the New Zealand Pacific Party.

== 2010 demise ==
After the general election, nothing further was heard from the Family Party. It did not stand a candidate in the Mount Albert by-election, caused after former Prime Minister Helen Clark took up her new post as Director of the United Nations Development Program.

On 23 February 2010 the party applied to the Electoral Commission to cancel its registration. On 29 April 2010 the party was officially de-registered.

== Electoral results ==
Election	# of party votes	% of party vote	# of seats won	Government/opposition?
2008	8,176	0.35	0 / 120	Not in Parliament

== See also ==
- Christian politics in New Zealand
