= Outdoor Recreation New Zealand =

Defunct political party in New Zealand

- Founded: 8 March 2002
- Dissolved: 4 September 2007
- Ideology: Hunting and fishing rights

Outdoor Recreation New Zealand (ORNZ) was an organisation and political party in New Zealand from 2002 to 2007 that was concerned primarily with lobbying for the hunting and fishing fraternity, but also including people who participate in other outdoor sports. The party stated its goal was to fight "the rapid erosion of sporting rights, resources and opportunities for outdoor sportspeople", claiming that environmental policies imposed unreasonable restrictions.

The party was proposed in October 2001. Shortly afterwards, a meeting near Nelson agreed to establish a political party. The founders of the party said that "lobbying government has never been effective", and that establishing a political party was the only way to achieve their goals. On 8 March 2002, the party successfully registered with the Electoral Commission, having obtained the necessary five hundred members. This entitled it to seek and gain list votes under the MMP system. The party also gained government funding for broadcasting.

Outdoor Recreation New Zealand had its first test in the 2002 election. It won 25,985 votes, around 1.28% of the total.

In 2003, the party announced that it would be seeking an agreement with the larger United Future New Zealand party, which was already in parliament. This agreement, further elaborated on in 2004, saw Outdoor Recreation "become affiliated" to United Future. Outdoor Recreation retained its separate identity, but contested the 2005 election under the United Future banner. It did not gain any seats; none of the three MPs elected for United Future were from Outdoor Recreation.

In March 2006 the party split from United Future due to a dissatisfaction with the Christian evangelism within the party. ORNZ acting chairman Phil Hoare stating that: "We strongly believe in the traditional bedrock values of our nation's heritage but we also affirm the separation of church and state."

The party requested and received deregistration in 2007.
