= The Kiwi Party =

- Leader: Larry Baldock
- President: Gordon Copeland
- Founded: 2007
- Dissolved: 2011
- Headquarters: 255 Cameron Road, Tauranga 3110
- Ideology: Christian democracy, Conservatism
- Colours: Blue and Red

The Kiwi Party was a political party operating in New Zealand between 2007 and 2011. Briefly known as Future New Zealand, it was a breakaway from the United Future New Zealand party and sought to carry on the tradition of Future New Zealand. The party was formed when MP Gordon Copeland left United Future after a dispute over support for the Crimes (Substituted Section 59) Amendment Act 2007. At the 2008 general election, the Kiwi Party was unsuccessful, and was not re-elected to Parliament. It did not contest the 2011 general election under its own banner, but the leaders and other members stood for the Conservative Party.

The party advocated more direct democracy through referendums and a return to the "Judeo-Christian ethic in democracy". On 8 February 2012, it requested that the Electoral Commission cancel its registration, which rendered it wholly subsumed into the Conservative Party. On its website, it announced that after holding an executive committee meeting in December 2011, the party had agreed to be 'wound up' and 'bring its existence to an end.'

== Future New Zealand Party reformed ==
On 16 May 2007, list MP Gordon Copeland resigned from the United Future party, citing differences with party leader Peter Dunne over the latter's support of the child-discipline bill. Copeland announced his intention to re-form an independent Future New Zealand party with former United Future list MP Larry Baldock as co-leader. Copeland and Baldock acknowledged that the new party would face difficulties over issues like legal ownership of the party name, but were hopeful that they would be able to attract United Future's former conservative Christian voters. An inaugural meeting was held in Baldock's city of residence, Tauranga, and former United Future list MP Bernie Ogilvy became party secretary. Meanwhile, Brian Tamaki and his Destiny New Zealand party announced that it would contest the New Zealand conservative Christian vote at the next New Zealand general election in 2008.

On 14 June 2007 Copeland announced that Future New Zealand would "not work with, or be part of, a Labour-led government following the 2008 elections". Copeland also gave his proxy vote in Parliament to the National Party (except on matters of confidence and supply).

In June 2007, Copeland announced in his monthly "Copeland's Chronicle" newsletter that Future New Zealand had attracted the necessary five hundred members required for registration under the Electoral Act 1993. Baldock and Copeland were working on establishing a Board of Management and Board of Reference for their new party, still tentatively named "Future New Zealand." He also asserted his right to continue sitting in New Zealand's Parliament as a list MP.

== Name change to the Kiwi Party ==
On 25 January 2008, it was announced that Future New Zealand was to be known as the Kiwi Party. Copeland stepped down as co-leader to focus on his Parliamentary responsibilities, leaving Baldock as the sole leader. The party applied to the Electoral Commission to register its new name, and was registered on 15 February 2008.

=== Policies ===
At the party's South Island conference in Christchurch the party outlined a number of policy ideas:

- people should be able to direct $100 of their income tax to a charity of their choice each year
- lift the adult minimum wage from the expected $12 an hour to $15 an hour
- provide employers with a 100% tax rebate to cover the minimum wage increase
- establish a Royal Commission to investigate the causes of family breakdown, family violence and child abuse.

== 2008 election ==
Going into the 2008 elections, the party had only one list MP, and no electorate MPs, in Parliament, and did not register significant support in national polls. Acting secretary Bernie Ogilvy apologised for not applying for free election broadcasting in time; Larry Baldock said "This does make our task just that much harder." The party fielded 25 electorate candidates out of a possible 70.

The party won just 12,755 party votes, or 0.54% of the votes cast, well short of the 5% required to gain list-only representation without winning an electorate. Baldock stood in Tauranga, winning 1893 votes, well behind National's Simon Bridges and his New Zealand First and Labour challengers. Copeland was similarly unsuccessful in Rongotai, winning just 515 votes. Despite this result, the party stated that they would contest the next general election, in 2011.

== 2008–2012 ==
Gordon Copeland was elected as Party President in March 2009. The party contested the 2009 Mount Albert by-election, selecting Simmone Dyer as their candidate. Dyer came seventh with 91 votes. The party did not contest the subsequent Mana, Botany or Te Tai Tokerau by-elections.

Larry Baldock was one of the chief protagonists behind the 2009 referendum which attempted to repeal the Crimes (Substituted Section 59) Amendment Act 2007. The referendum passed with the support of 87.4% of voters, but was non-binding, and the government responded by promising a review of the law. In response, Baldock circulated a second citizens initiated referendum, calling for binding citizens initiated referendums in future debates. The proposed referendum petition fell well short of the required number of signatures to trigger such a referendum and lapsed on 10 December 2010.

The demise of the Family Party and New Zealand Pacific Party in 2010 left the Kiwi Party as the only conservative Christian-based political party within New Zealand politics. This was changed by the arrival of Colin Craig's Conservative Party of New Zealand in August 2011.

On 14 October 2011 the Kiwi Party announced that it would not be standing any candidates in the election, and that several members had joined the Conservative Party and would be standing for it. Party leader Baldock was number three on the Conservative Party list and stood again in Tauranga. Deputy leader Dyer was number 7 on the list and stood in East Coast Bays. Party president Copeland stood in Hutt South. No candidate was successful. Other members also stood for the Conservatives on their party list.

The party was deregistered at its own request on 8 February 2012, which marks the cessation of its independent political existence. Its former website URL is now also inoperative.

== Electoral results ==
Election	# of party votes	% of party vote	# of seats won	Government/opposition?
2008	12,755	0.54	0 / 120	Not in Parliament

== See also ==
- Christian politics in New Zealand
- List of political parties in New Zealand
