= Gordon Copeland =

New Zealand politician

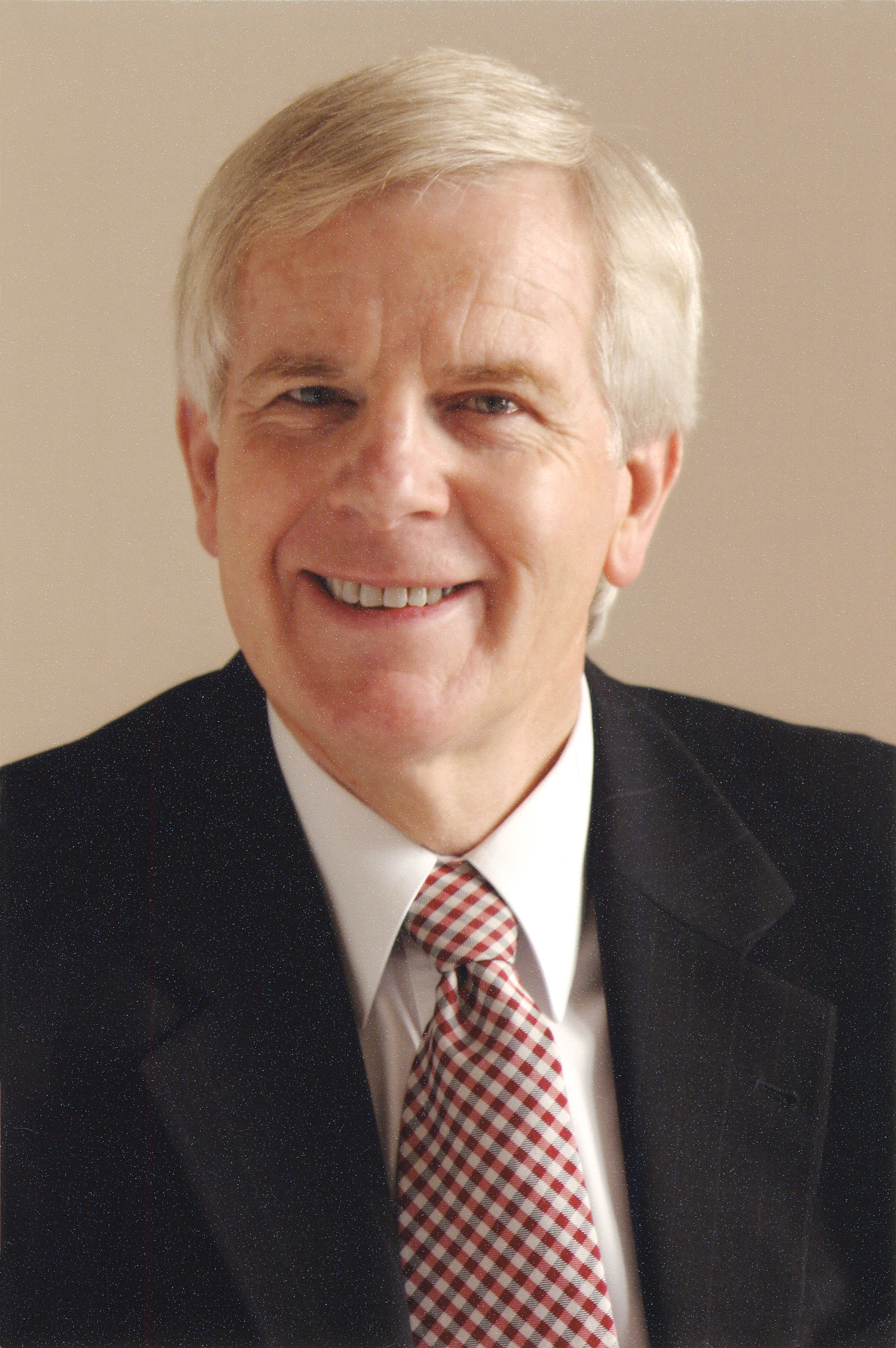

Member of the New Zealand Parliament for United Future party list
- In office 2002–2008

Personal details
- Born: 19 August 1943 Mahana, Tasman District, New Zealand
- Died: 24 November 2018 (aged 75) Wellington, New Zealand
- Party: Conservative Party
- Other political affiliations: The Kiwi Party; United Future
- Spouse: Anne
- Children: 5

Gordon Frank Copeland (19 August 1943 – 24 November 2018) was a New Zealand politician who served as a Member of Parliament from 2002 to 2008. He entered the House of Representatives as a list MP for the United Future New Zealand Party from 2002 but he resigned from the party in 2007. In March 2009, Copeland became Party President of The Kiwi Party, which he had co-founded with another former United Future list MP, Larry Baldock, in May 2007. Copeland stood for the Conservative Party in the 2011 New Zealand general election. Prior to entering Parliament he held a number of corporate positions before working as the financial administrator for the Roman Catholic Archdiocese of Wellington.

== Early life and family ==
Of English and Irish ancestry, Copeland was born at Mahana, near Māpua, on 19 August 1943. He was married to Anne and they had five children. He graduated with a Bachelor of Commerce degree from Victoria University of Wellington and was qualified as a Chartered Accountant.

== Pre-Parliamentary career ==
Prior to entering parliament, Copeland worked for fourteen years in the oil industry, becoming the chief financial officer of BP in New Zealand. Later, he worked as a self-employed business consultant with corporate and government clients. From 1984 to 2002 he served as the Financial Administrator of the Roman Catholic Archdiocese of Wellington.

Copeland chaired the Inter-Church Working Party on Taxation (1987–2002) and became a member of the Working Party on Registration, Reporting and Monitoring of Charities that led to setting up the New Zealand Charities Commission.

He participated in a wide range of ecumenical activities, and in 2000 convened "Celebrate Jesus 2000", which saw 28,000 Christians come together at Wellington's Westpac Stadium to celebrate the presumed 2000th birthday of Jesus.

== Member of Parliament ==
New Zealand Parliament
Years	Term	Electorate	List	Party
2002–2005	47th	List	2	United Future
2005–2007	48th	List	3	United Future
2007–2008	Changed allegiance to:			Independent

The United Future party ranked Copeland second on their party list for the 2002 general election and he won election to Parliament with seven other United Future candidates. In the 2005 general election, he was third on the party list and was one of three United Future MPs.

=== Opposition to same-sex marriage ===
Following his 2005 re-election, Copeland gained the support of other social conservatives for his socially conservative political views. In early December 2005, he introduced his colleague Larry Baldock's Marriage Amendment (Gender Clarification) Bill, which emulated Australian and US legislation that sought to define marriage in New Zealand as heterosexual. It failed to win support.

=== Opposition to abortion and to voluntary euthanasia ===
Subsequently, Copeland protested against the establishment of a hosted website for Australian euthanasia-activist Philip Nitschke's Exit International organisation, and approached the New Zealand Ministers of Immigration and Information Technology, as well as the New Zealand Police, seeking to frustrate Nitschke's attempts to resettle in that country.

Copeland wanted to introduce a private member's ballot bill designed to require women seeking abortion to undergo mandatory counselling covering both proceeding with the pregnancy and abortion prior to making a decision. This bill, the Contraception, Sterilisation and Abortion (Informed Consent) Bill, resembled Australian Capital Territory legislation repealed several years ago. Women do not have to consult optional counselling services under the Contraception, Sterilisation, and Abortion Act 1977. As a devout Catholic, Copeland espoused anti-abortion views in debates about reproductive freedom for women, and believed that women did not receive relevant information related to abortion procedures, hence the title to the Bill, which was never drawn from the ballot for private members bills.

=== Opposition to prohibiting parental corporal punishment ===
Copeland criticised Sue Bradford's private member's Child Discipline Bill (introduced in 2005), an amendment to New Zealand's Crimes Act 1961 which removed the legal defence of "reasonable force" for parents prosecuted for assault on their children, and had previously obtained a Queen's Counsel opinion confirming that legal position. Sue Bradford said that the fact that Copeland did not disclose that his Queen's Counsel, Peter McKenzie, had previously represented Christian organisations like Right to Life New Zealand and the Society for Promotion of Community Standards undermined the opinion.

=== Resignation from United Future ===
On 16 May 2007, Copeland resigned from the United Future party after its leader, Peter Dunne, had consistently voted for Bradford's Child Discipline Bill, which removed the defence of "reasonable force" related to parental corporal punishment of children. Copeland has since said that after the 2005 elections, which saw the United Future caucus reduce from eight to three, Dunne had wanted to return to his liberal roots and to see an end to the Christian influence in the party. Dunne also told Copeland that he regretted having voted against the legalisation of prostitution and the Civil Unions Act. In a televised interview on 3 July 2007, Dunne said that Copeland's decision to quit came after a failed leadership bid in January 2007. This is strongly denied by Copeland who says that he had never thought of, let alone made, such a bid.

After resigning, Copeland missed the vote against the Bill that he had quit his party over, when the debate ended well ahead of its scheduled two hours. He had his vote against the Bill recorded retrospectively by leave of the House. As an independent MP, Copeland gave a proxy vote to the Opposition National Party to cast on his behalf while absent from the House, for any matters apart from confidence and supply.

=== Future New Zealand Party / The Kiwi Party ===
Copeland announced that he would form a separate Future New Zealand party with ex-United Future List MP Larry Baldock. According to Copeland, Future New Zealand already had 16 to 20 members, and Baldock said that 45 former Future New Zealand party members had attended an inaugural meeting in Tauranga. Former United Future list MP Bernie Ogilvy became the party secretary of Future New Zealand, according to the website. In June 2007, Copeland announced in his monthly "Copeland's Chronicle" newsletter that Future New Zealand had attracted the necessary 500 members required for registration under the Electoral Act 1993. Baldock and Copeland were working on establishing a board of management and board of reference for their new party, still tentatively named "Future New Zealand". Copeland also asserted his right to continue sitting in New Zealand's Parliament as a list MP.

On 17 September 2007, Copeland publicly confirmed an intention to co-lead a new political party with Richard Lewis, after Bishop Brian Tamaki, founder of the Destiny New Zealand party, had announced it at a press conference without Copeland's knowledge. However, that announcement, coupled with Tamaki's statements that the Destiny New Zealand party would de-register and that he would not rule out a candidacy in the 2008 elections, gave the media the impression that the new party, which had no name, would be just a re-formed Destiny Party. Rank-and-file members of Future New Zealand immediately reacted negatively to that perception, so Copeland announced on 20 September 2007 that he "could not work" with Lewis, and would remain co-leader of Future New Zealand with Baldock. In October 2007 Copeland distanced himself from The Family Party, led by Lewis, which formed out of Destiny New Zealand, and said he would contest the 2008 election under the Future New Zealand banner.

On 28 January 2008, Future New Zealand changed its name to The Kiwi Party and Copeland relinquished his joint leadership to Larry Baldock, announcing that he would henceforth concentrate on parliamentary matters. In the 2008 general election Copeland stood for The Kiwi Party in the Rongotai electorate. He fared poorly, receiving only 515 electorate votes, and the Kiwi Party did not cross the 5% threshold to enter Parliament.

== Post-Parliamentary career ==
In March 2009, the Kiwi Party elected Copeland as their president. In the 2011 general election Kiwi Party members stood for the Conservative Party of New Zealand, with Copeland unsuccessfully contesting the Hutt South electorate.

The New Zealand Electoral Commission de-registered the Kiwi Party in February 2012.

In November 2012 Copeland made headlines when he compared same-sex marriage to apartheid.

In August 2014 the Conservative Party listed Copeland as its candidate in the Hutt South electorate for the 2014 general election.

Copeland died in a Wellington hospice on 24 November 2018.

== Political views ==
=== Social policy ===
As a Member of Parliament Copeland said he wanted to give a central focus to the role and importance of the family in building a strong nation. To that end, he was a strong advocate for marriage preparation and marriage enrichment programmes and parenting programmes, at every level from pre-natal through to the teenage years.

Copeland wanted to develop policy giving greater encouragement to charities and not-for-profit organisations; and a taxation-system minimising distortions, ensuring that — through a mix of private savings and government support — New Zealanders had adequate retirement incomes.

Copeland introduced bills adding private-property rights to the New Zealand Bill of Rights Act and removing GST from rates. Both were defeated. He advocated for lower taxes for both individuals and companies.

=== Former political positions ===
Former policy positions as part of United Future New Zealand include:

- a national control strategy for deer, chamois and pigs
- walking access for recreational use
- a review of the Prostitution Reform Act 2003
- promoting investigating adopting either an Australian currency or combined ANZAC dollar.

== Former political offices ==
- Former Party Whip, United Future
- Former United Future New Zealand Spokesman on:
  - Economics and Business: Finance; Revenue; Customs; Public Trust; Economic Development; Industry & Regional Development; Industry & Regional Development; Small Business; Commerce; State Owned Enterprise; Labour & Immigration;
  - Primary Industry: Agriculture; Forestry; Fisheries; Horticulture;
  - Infrastructure: Energy; Transport; Transport Safety; Land Information; Statistics; Communications;
  - Outdoors: Tourism; Conservation; Sport and Recreation
- Member and deputy chair of the Finance and Expenditure Select Committee
- Member and deputy chair of the Commerce Select Committee
