= Murray Smith (New Zealand politician) =

New Zealand politician

Member of the New Zealand Parliament for United Future list
- In office 27 July 2002 – 17 September 2005

Personal details
- Party: United Future New Zealand
- Other political affiliations: Christian Democrat

Murray Smith is a former New Zealand politician. He was a member of the United Future New Zealand party caucus, having been elected to Parliament as a list MP in the 2002 election.

== Political career ==
New Zealand Parliament
Years	Term	Electorate	List	Party
2002–2005	47th	List	6	United Future

Before entering national politics, Smith was a lawyer.

He was a founding member of the Christian Democrats, which later became Future New Zealand. Future New Zealand then joined with United New Zealand to form the modern United Future New Zealand.

For the 1996 election, the Christian Democrats formed a coalition with Christian Heritage New Zealand, and he was ranked 13th on the party list of the resulting Christian Coalition, but he did not contest an electorate.

Like his associates, Larry Baldock, Bernie Ogilvy, Paul Adams and Marc Alexander, Smith only served one term before he left Parliament at the 2005 New Zealand general election, given that his party polled only one-third of its previous electoral support.

In the 2008 election, Smith stood for United Future in the electorate of Hutt South.
