= Anthony Walton (politician) =

New Zealand politician (born 1962)

Anthony John Walton (born 1962) is a former New Zealand political party president. He was leader of the Future New Zealand party in 1999, having previously been a prominent member of Future New Zealand's predecessor, the Christian Democrat Party. Walton was on the Christian Democrats' National Council starting when the party was launched in 1995. Walton championed Future New Zealand's merger with United New Zealand, creating the modern United Future New Zealand party in 2000. He was expected to take second place on United Future's party list but elected instead to pursue other career options. Walton is currently chief minister at the Olive Tree Church in Wellington. He is also associated with Zeal, an evangelical Christian youth enterprise and entertainment venue in that city. He has written on the subject of Christian apologetics and church formation. In 2001, he wrote a Christian apologetic's work (see below).

Party political offices
Preceded by Office established	Deputy Leader of United Future; 2000–2004	Succeeded by Judy Turner

== Bibliography ==
- Anthony Walton: Think Outside the Box: Philosophy, Logic and The World Next Door: Wellington: Global Tribe: 2001: ISBN 0-473-07538-5
