= United Future =

New Zealand political party

United Future New Zealand Te Rōpū Unaititi Heke Mai
- Leader: Peter Dunne (2000–2017); Damian Light (2017)
- Founder: Peter Dunne
- Founded: 2000
- Dissolved: 14 November, 2017
- Merger of: United New Zealand, Future New Zealand
- Ideology: Liberal conservatism; 2000–2007: Christian democracy
- Political position: Centre

United Future New Zealand, usually known as United Future, was a centrist political party in New Zealand. The party was in government between 2005 and 2017, first alongside Labour (2005–2008) and then supporting National (2008–2017).

United Future was formed from the merger of the liberal party United New Zealand and Christian-dominated conservative Future New Zealand to contest the 2002 election. It was represented in the New Zealand Parliament from its foundation until September 2017. The party won eight seats in 2002; however it was reduced to three members of Parliament in 2005. Between 2008 and 2017, United Future was solely represented in Parliament by party leader Peter Dunne, who represented the Ōhāriu electorate in Wellington. Dunne was re-elected during both the 2011 and 2014 general elections.

In August 2017, Dunne announced his retirement from politics prior to the 2017 general election. Damian Light was appointed as the new leader on 23 August. During the 2017 general election, United Future lost its sole seat in Parliament and attained only 0.1% of the party vote.

In November 2017, a leaked email announced that United Future would move to dissolve after a unanimous decision by the party board to do so. On 14 November an announcement was made on the party's website signalling that the party had officially been dissolved. The party was formally de-registered on 28 February 2018.

== History ==
Graphic representation of changes to Christian political parties in New Zealand, showing coalitions, mergers, splits and renamings

=== Formation and early success ===
United Future was formed from the merger of liberal centrist party United New Zealand and Christian-dominated conservative Future New Zealand to contest the 2002 election. United, formed as a centrist party by a group of moderate Labour and National MPs, held one seat in parliament—that of Dunne. Future New Zealand, which was not represented in parliament, was a "secularised" evolution of the Christian Democrats, following the same basic principles as the Christian Democrats, but abandoning the explicit religious connection.

United Future's first party president, Ian Tulloch, stated that "United Future isn't a Christian party – it's a political party that has a lot of Christians in it, and a lot of non-Christians." Tulloch said that the "universal principles of family, of common sense, of looking after one another, of compassion, integrity" are equally valuable to both Christians and non-Christians.

Support for United Future, which was already growing in early 2002, was boosted further by Peter Dunne's strong television debating performance and the public response to it. The uplift in United Future support during the last two weeks of the campaign caught many commentators by surprise and drew votes away from National, Labour and the Green parties, who were engaged in a public squabble over genetic engineering.

United Future made a strong showing in the 2002 election, taking 6.7 percent of the vote and eight seats: Dunne's electorate seat of Ohariu-Belmont and seven list seats. It would have been assured of getting into parliament in any event, however; under New Zealand's mixed-member proportional system, any party that wins at least one electorate seat qualifies for list seats even if it falls short of the five-percent threshold. The party faced a minor embarrassment after the election, however, when it was discovered that one of its list MPs, Kelly Chal, was not a New Zealand citizen, and thus ineligible to stand for parliament.

=== Early activity ===
After 2002 United Future in its family law reform proposals took to heart the trauma and adverse impact on children caused by the separation of their parents. United Future MP Judy Turner made clear that then current government policies were failing in regard to keeping both parents in children's lives, and to this extent made a huge effort in promoting a member's bill on mandatory mediation by means of a national roll-out of the North Shore Family Court "Children in the Middle" pilot programme.

In December 2004, United Future MPs exercised their individual conscience votes to oppose a bill to enable civil unions. This bill, which passed Parliament by a vote of 65 to 55, provided some marriage-like benefits for same-sex couples (who could not marry in New Zealand until August 2013) and for opposite-sex couples who choose not to marry. However, Peter Dunne alone among United Future MPs voted for the subsequent Relationships (Statutory References) Bill in March 2005, which passed by 76 to 44 votes and removed discriminatory wording from a range of statutes.

In mid-2004 United Future announced that it would contest the 2005 general election in partnership with Outdoor Recreation New Zealand. Cynics pointed out that, like Future New Zealand, Outdoor Recreation was a minor party with no prospect of reaching the 5% threshold (Outdoor Recreation gained 1.28% of the vote in the 2002 election) seeking parliamentary representation via the security of Peter Dunne's electorate seat.

A month before the September 2005 election, list MP Paul Adams quit the party to stand as an independent in the East Coast Bays electorate. His daughter Sharee Adams, also on the United Future List, also quit to assist her father in his campaign. After the general election, disgruntled right-winger and ex-United Future MP Marc Alexander also voiced repeated criticisms of his former colleagues, in his "Marc My Words" political opinion column for Scoop, a New Zealand news website.

In the 2005 election, United Future had the support of the WIN Party, which was set up to fight the ban on smoking in bars and restaurants. WIN's leader, John van Buren, was United Future's candidate for Christchurch Central. This further spoke of alliances still to come. In this election, support plummeted to 2.8% and the party won only three seats. Peter Dunne retained Ohariu-Belmont, and Gordon Copeland and Judy Turner were returned on its party list.

United Future had tried to distance itself from its more assertive fundamentalist list MPs, such as Adams, Larry Baldock and Murray Smith. As Election New Zealand data revealed that the Outdoor Recreation Party still provided about 1% of the vote, 4.8% of the previous vote had gone elsewhere. During 2004–2005, the National Party had made renewed efforts to attract social conservative voters, through adoption of anti-abortion and anti-same-sex marriage voting records.

Following the 2005 election, New Zealand First and United Future entered into a confidence and supply agreement with Labour, under which Dunne became Minister of Revenue, outside Cabinet.

In March 2006 Outdoor Recreation New Zealand split with United Future, due to a dissatisfaction with what it saw as the Christian evangelism within the party. Outdoor Recreation acting chairman Phil Hoare said, "We strongly believe in the traditional bedrock values of our nation's heritage but we also affirm the separation of church and state." In 2006 several younger centrist members also departed from the party.

United Future, like most New Zealand Parliamentary parties, was caught up in the 2005 New Zealand election funding controversy. It voted in favour of the retrospective validating legislation, which was passed through the New Zealand Parliament in October 2006.

Old United Future logo

From February to April 2007, Peter Dunne exercised his own right to a conscience vote to support Sue Bradford's private members bill against parental corporal punishment of children, while Gordon Copeland vigorously opposed it, as did Judy Turner, but on a more subtle level.

On 16 May 2007, Copeland resigned from the party due to his dissatisfaction with Dunne's support for the aforementioned private members bill, although Turner did not follow suit. Copeland was subsequently part of forming the socially conservative Kiwi Party. Several other United Future members resigned in sympathy with Copeland, including former United Future List MPs Larry Baldock and Bernie Ogilvy. In 2011, the Kiwi Party ceased to exist as an independent entity after it merged with the Conservative Party of New Zealand, another conservative Christian dominated centre-right political party, currently unrepresented in Parliament.

On 13 August 2007 United Future unveiled a new logo which Dunne said was a revitalisation of the party before the 2008 election. The re-branding of the party was taken further on 3 September 2007 when Peter Dunne announced that United Future was becoming a moderate centrist party after the break with its former conservative Christian faction. Speaking of the departure of Copeland and the rest of the more strident Christians in the party, Dunne said, "I think it's taken a bit of a monkey off our back, frankly."

=== 2008 election ===
In 2008 the United Future Party named candidates for 51 seats. Policies included tax cuts and various initiatives aimed at supporting parents, such as the extension of paid parental leave to 12 months; the option of income splitting for tax purposes for parents with dependent children and couples in which one partner relies on the other for financial support; and the promotion of shared parenting. There were also a number of health care policies including granting everyone one free health check per year.

Peter Dunne was re-elected as United Future's only member of Parliament. He retained his parliamentary seat of Ohariu-Belmont, but United Future did not poll sufficiently highly to bring additional caucus members into Parliament. Some Future New Zealand members defected from United Future to establish The Kiwi Party, which was unsuccessful in retaining parliamentary representation after the election.

The National Party won the most seats overall and formed a minority government with support from United Future, the Māori Party and ACT New Zealand. Dunne retained his portfolios as Minister of Revenue and Associate Minister for Health.

=== 2011 election ===
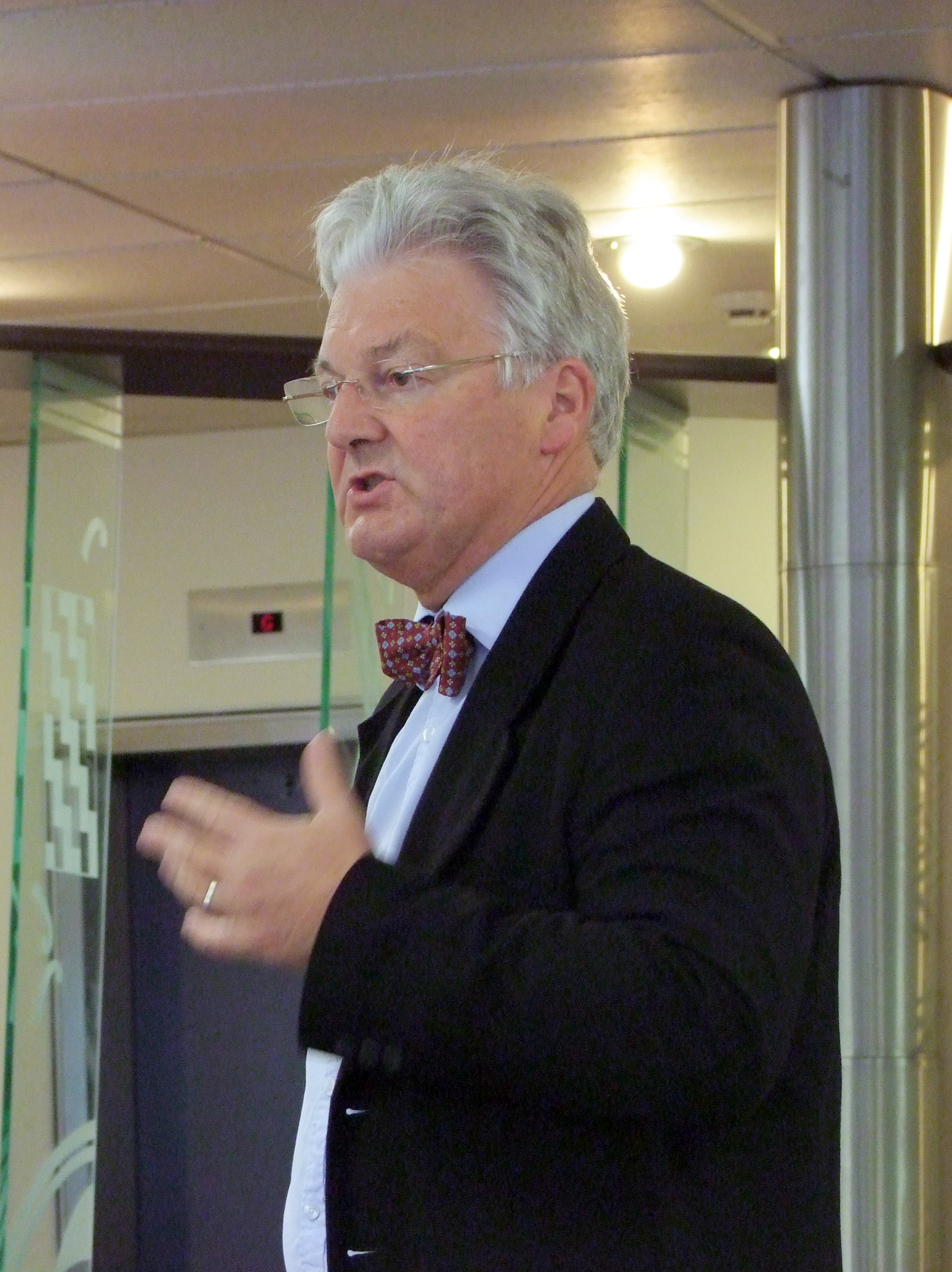
Then-leader Peter Dunne speaking in 2012

In 2011 United Future campaigned on income splitting, flexible superannuation and restricting asset sales.

Peter Dunne retained the electorate of Ōhariu electorate, formerly Ohariu-Belmont. The Labour candidate Charles Chauvel accused Dunne and the National Party of an "unprincipled political deal" which encouraged National voters to give their electorate vote to Dunne to ensure his survival as an MP.

As in 2008, the National Party won the most seats overall and formed a minority government with support from United Future, the Māori Party and ACT New Zealand. Together with his previous Revenue and Associate Health portfolios, Dunne became Associate Minister of Conservation. The agreement included provisions barring the sale of Kiwibank or Radio New Zealand, and public consultation on United Future's flexible superannuation policy.

=== Temporary party de-registration ===
On 31 May 2013 the Electoral Commission cancelled United Future's registration at the party's request after it failed to retain 500 members. The party became an unregistered party – unable to contest the party-list vote. However, on 10 June 2013, its party president made a media release stating that it had succeeded in attracting the needed 500 members for re-registration. It was subsequently reported that United Future was encountering difficulties over its re-registration, related to the need to acquire printed proof of sufficient membership, although Party President Robin Gunston had supplied the Electoral Commission with copies of traceable economic transactions associated with the influx of new members.

On 16 June 2013 the Electoral Commission noted that United Future had provided the aforementioned spreadsheet record, which contained names and details of putative party members. It noted that under Section 63 of the New Zealand Electoral Act 1993, bona fide registered political parties were bound to supply name, address, eligibility for membership, evidence of paid membership fees, member authorisation to record such details and to release them to a third party. The Commission stated that it would therefore accept signed and dated (although electronically submitted) membership forms from United Future and other eligible parties as evidence of membership enrolment. Signature and membership authenticity had yet to be assessed at that point

Events took a further turn when New Zealand Parliament Speaker David Carter ruled that as United Future could not guarantee that his party had 500 financially solvent members for another six to eight weeks after Dunne had submitted a membership list to the New Zealand Electoral Commission, Dunne would therefore have to sit as an "independent" member of Parliament, and to forfeit NZ$100,000 parliamentary party leader operational funding unless and until United Future could conclusively establish whether or not it had sufficient membership to warrant re-registration. This occurred after New Zealand Labour Party MP Trevor Mallard contacted the New Zealand Attorney-General over the current legal status of United Future

On 8 July 2013 Dunne stated that his party had now been able to enrol sufficient members to satisfy the Electoral Commission's random sampling techniques, although he also noted that the process of evaluation and re-enrolment would take six to eight weeks. At the same time, the New Zealand Electoral Commission verified that this was indeed the case and then clarified what would happen next. There would be an interim period when it checked the actual status of the party's membership, then provided public notice of United Future's membership application and invitation of comments, then provide the applicant party's leadership with an opportunity to respond to the comments and then decide whether to refuse or approve the application from United Future On 30 July 2013, the New Zealand Electoral Commission requested input pending United Future's ultimate re-registration

On 13 August 2013 the electoral commission accepted United Future's re-registration.

=== 2014 election ===
As in 2008 and 2011, the National Party won the most seats overall and formed a minority government with support from United Future's single MP (Dunne) and the Māori Party.

=== 2017 election ===
During the 2017 general election, United Future ran 8 electorate candidates and 10 list candidates. On 21 August 2017, leader and MP Peter Dunne announced that he was quitting politics at the election, citing recent polling and his perception that there was a mood for change in his seat of Ōhāriu. Damian Light was announced as the new leader on 23 August. During the 2017 election, United Future gained only 0.1% of the party vote and lost its sole seat in Parliament.

Following the election, a number of options were canvassed for United Future, including dissolving as a party, rebranding, or focusing its efforts on electing its members as independents to local councils. However, the party had a vanishingly small membership base, with Alex Braae of The Spinoff describing United Future as almost nonexistent beyond the executive level. Many members had either only joined to prevent the party from being deregistered in 2013, or were hangers-on from various mergers and alliances forged by Peter Dunne, and thus were not actively involved in United Future. On 13 November 2017, an email was sent to party members, stating that a decision had been made at the previous weekend's Annual General Meeting to disband United Future in light of poor electoral results and the unlikelihood of receiving enough votes to return to parliament in the future. The AGM was attended by a small number of members, as well as most of United Future's governing board. On 14 November, Light and Dunne confirmed that United Future would be dissolving due to the loss of its Parliamentary presence. The party's registration was cancelled on 28 February 2018.

== Policy ==
United Future adopted the following mission statement in early 2007:

"United Future is a modern centre party, focused on New Zealand's best interests. We promote strong families and vibrant communities. We seek a fair, and open society, free from poverty, ignorance and prejudice, and based on innovation, self-reliance, justice and integrity in business and personal dealings. We promote a sustainable environment, and a competitive economy which encourages growth, prosperity, ownership and opportunity through market policies where possible, and government where necessary. We want all New Zealanders, whatever their background, race or creed, to have the chance to enjoy everything that is good in our country."

== Electoral results (2002–2017) ==
Election	candidates nominated (electorate/list)	seats won	party votes	popular vote	+/–	Position	Government/Opposition
2002	63 / 60	8 / 120	135,918	6.69%	▲8	▲6th	Confidence and supply
2005	62 / 57	3 / 121	60,860	2.67%	▼5	6th	Confidence and supply
2008	51 / 30	1 / 122	20,497	0.87%	▼2	▼7th	Confidence and supply
2011	20 / 17	1 / 121	13,443	0.60%	Steady	▼8th	Confidence and supply
2014	11 / 11	1 / 121	4,533	0.22%	Steady	▲7th	Confidence and supply
2017	8 / 10	0 / 120	1,782	0.07%	▼1	▼13th	Extra-parliamentary

== Former MPs ==
- Paul Adams, in 2008, Family Party candidate for East Coast Bays
- Marc Alexander, in 2008, National Party candidate for Wigram
- Larry Baldock, in 2008, Kiwi Party candidate for Tauranga
- Bernie Ogilvy, Kiwi Party secretary (did not stand for election)
- Murray Smith, in 2008, United Future candidate for Hutt South
- Gordon Copeland, in 2008, Kiwi Party candidate for Rongotai
- Judy Turner, in 2008, United Future candidate for East Coast; in 2009, United Future candidate for Mount Albert electorate by-election.

== Leadership ==
=== Leader ===
	Leader	Term Began	Term Ended
1	Hon Peter Dunne	2000	23 August 2017
2	Damian Light	23 August 2017	14 November 2017

=== Deputy Leader ===
	Leader	Term Began	Term Ended
1	Anthony Walton	2000	2004
2	Judy Turner	2004	14 November 2017

== See also ==
- Politics of New Zealand
- List of political parties in New Zealand § Historical parties
