= Larry Baldock =

New Zealand politician

1st Leader of the Kiwi Party
- In office 5 January 2008 – December 2011
- Deputy: Gordon Copeland

Member of the New Zealand Parliament for United Future list
- In office 2002–2005

Personal details
- Born: Larry David Baldock; 1954 (age 71–72)
- Party: Conservative
- Other political affiliations: Kiwi Party (2008–2011); Future (2007–2008); United Future (2002–2005)

Larry David Baldock (born 1954) is a New Zealand politician. Before entering national politics, he was involved with Youth With A Mission and spent 15 years living in the Philippines. After returning to New Zealand in 1996, he joined Future New Zealand in 1999, standing as a candidate in the Tauranga electorate at that year's general election. In 2001, he was elected to the Tauranga City Council, and served as a list MP for United Future New Zealand from 2002 to 2005.

== Political career ==
=== United Future MP ===
New Zealand Parliament
Years	Term	Electorate	List	Party
2002–2005	47th	List	7	United Future

Baldock was elected to Parliament in the 2002 general election. Along with Murray Smith, Bernie Ogilvy, and Marc Alexander, Baldock failed to make it back to the 48th New Zealand Parliament in 2005, given United Future New Zealand's drop in electoral support to one-third the level at the previous general election. Like Smith, Ogilvy and Adams, Baldock is a Christian.

=== Anti-smacking referendum ===
When the Crimes (Substituted Section 59) Amendment Bill, which would remove parental correction as a defence for assault against children, began to raise debate nationally, Baldock began organising a petition to force a referendum on the question, "Should a smack, as part of good parental correction, be a criminal offence in New Zealand?" With his wife Barbara, Baldock travelled all over New Zealand for the next 18 months. With the help of many volunteers and support from organisations like 'Family First' they collected approximately 310,000 signatures from voters, surpassing the 285,000 signatures, or 10 per cent of total voters, required to force a referendum. When it was held from 31 July to 21 August 2009 voter turnout was 56.1%, with 87.4% of voters answered 'no'. In June 2009, then Prime Minister John Key said that the government would change the law if it was not working, but that he believed the current law was working well.

=== The Kiwi Party ===
On 16 May 2007, Baldock and his former colleague Gordon Copeland, then a United Future List MP, announced that they would be forming a new Future New Zealand party after expressing dissatisfaction with party leader Peter Dunne's support of the child-discipline bill.

After the announcement that Copeland and Baldock would co-lead the new party, they held an inaugural party meeting in Tauranga, Baldock's city of residence, and stated that forty-five former members of the pre-merger Future New Zealand had attended, although the party had between sixteen and twenty members at that time. Former United Future List MP Bernie Ogilvy also joined Future New Zealand, as party secretary.

On 17 July 2007, the Future New Zealand website's Copeland Chronicle (June 2007) edition announced that the Party had achieved its five hundred member goal required for registration under the New Zealand Electoral Act 1993 as a viable political party. The newsletter also stated that Copeland and Baldock would now work on establishing a Board of Management and Board of Reference for the party.

On 28 January 2008, Future New Zealand was renamed The Kiwi Party. Baldock became sole party leader, while Copeland concentrated primarily on parliamentary matters. Baldock successfully collected 390,000 signatures against the Child Discipline Act, which forced a referendum on the issue. Baldock has proposed giving parents the right to strike their children with implements stating, "I'm not opposed to the wooden spoon or ruler because you can control things with that better than you can with an open hand."

In the 2008 general election, Baldock stood for the Tauranga electorate, but came a distant fourth, with approximately five per cent of the vote. The Kiwi Party also performed poorly, receiving 0.54% of the party vote nationwide.

Undaunted by its poor performance, the Kiwi Party held a conference in Christchurch in March 2009, and announced its intention to contest the 2011 general election. As The Family Party and New Zealand Pacific Party had been dissolved, it would have been the only Christian based party in the contest.

=== Conservative Party involvement ===
It was announced on 14 October 2011 that Kiwi Party members would not be running candidates for the 2011 election, instead standing for the Conservative Party, of which Baldock was ranked at number 3 on the 2011 party list. Baldock also stood for the Conservatives in the Tauranga electorate in 2011 gaining just over 4% of the popular vote

In April 2013 the Electoral Commission announced it had referred Baldock to the police for filing a false expenses return and for exceeding the $25,000 cap on election expenses. Baldock maintained the error was made by others, and the police did not lay charges.

Larry Baldock declined to stand as the Conservative Party's candidate in Tauranga in August 2014 partly because he disagreed with the party's policy of abolishing the Maori seats and removing references to the Treaty of Waitangi from legislation and also over concerns about Party leader Colin Craig's behaviour and his autocratic decision making.

He was removed from the Conservative Party's board before the end of 2014, and had his party membership suspended while he faced disciplinary action. The suspension was not related to his earlier policy disagreement. The subsequent strange and erratic behaviour of Colin Craig certainly seemed to vindicate Baldock's concerns and actions.

=== Tauranga City Council ===
In October 2010 Baldock was successful in being elected back onto the Tauranga City Council. He was elected to the City Council again in 2016 and re-elected in 2019 and appointed deputy mayor of Tauranga by the newly elected Mayor Tenby Powell. He resigned as deputy mayor on 2 June 2020 after much internal fighting amongst the elected members. Ultimately all were replaced when the Minister of Local Government appointed Commissioners to run the city when Mayor Powell himself also resigned on November 20 later that year.

=== 2023 general election ===
In early September 2023, Baldock announced he would be contesting the Tauranga electorate during the 2023 New Zealand general election as an independent candidate. He received 1039 votes, which was the sixth highest of ten candidates.

Party political offices
New political party	Leader of the Kiwi Party; 2008–2011	Incumbent
