= Paul Adams (New Zealand politician) =

New Zealand politician and rally driver

- Born: Paul Gavin Adams; 1948 (age 77–78)
- Occupations: Politician, Rally driver
- Known for: Rally driving, Political career
- Political party: NewZeal party (2023–present)
Paul Adams
World Rally Championship record
- Years active: 1977, 1979–1980, 1982–1985, 1990
- Co-driver: (New Zealand) Peter Davidson (New Zealand) Mike Franchi (New Zealand) Jim Scott (New Zealand) Sue Adams
- Teams: GM Dealer Team New Zealand, Toyota New Zealand
- Rallies: 8
- Championships: 0
- Rally wins: 0
- Podiums: 0
- Stage wins: 8
- Total points: 18
- First rally: 1977 South Pacific Rally
- Last rally: 1990 Rally of New Zealand

Paul Gavin Adams (born 1948) is a politician and former rally driving champion from New Zealand.

== Early years ==
Adams attended Naenae College. He was originally a carpenter and joiner, but later established a business manufacturing outdoor playground equipment. Later, he became a professional rally driver, and won three prestigious New Zealand championships. He also owned a Kia Motors and Suzuki dealerships in Auckland.

== Member of Parliament ==
New Zealand Parliament
Years	Term	Electorate	List	Party
2002–2005	47th	List	9	United Future

Adams is a member of Pentecostal City Impact Church, and as a result, became involved in Christian politics in New Zealand. After first being a member of the Christian Heritage Party, he joined the religious-based Future New Zealand party. Future New Zealand later merged with United New Zealand to form the modern United Future New Zealand group, which Adams remained a member of until 2005. In the 2002 election, Adams was ranked ninth on the United Future party list. Thanks to the unexpectedly strong performance of United Future, the party gained enough votes for eight seats, leaving Adams just outside Parliament. Later, Kelly Chal, a higher-ranked candidate, was forced to withdraw because she did not have New Zealand citizenship, which she had not realised was necessary. Adams, as the next candidate on the list, entered Parliament in her place.

Adams was one of the more conservative members of Parliament. After he was elected, it was reported that he had made a written submission on the 1993 Human Rights Bill saying that people with AIDS should not be allowed to "run loose". He also spoke out about subjects like abortion, and fasted for 21 days to oppose the civil unions legislation, which was passed regardless.

== Independent ==
On 15 August 2005 Adams left United Future to stand as an independent in the East Coast Bays Electorate. He gained 5809 votes after a short five-week campaign, which placed him third overall. He was subsequently involved with a proposed new party to be established by his former colleague Gordon Copeland and Destiny New Zealand. However, these negotiations collapsed, but Adams then became the Deputy Leader of The Family Party.

Adams stood as a candidate for The Family Party in the East Coast Bays electorate in the 2008 election. He polled third, behind National candidate Murray McCully and Labour candidate Vivienne Goldsmith. As The Family Party failed to win any other electorate or list seats, Adams did not re-enter Parliament.

Adams stood at the 2023 election for the NewZeal party at number 2 on the party list. Adams also contested the East Coast Bays electorate, coming fourth place with 890 votes. Overall, NewZeal only won 0.56 percent (16,126 votes), below the five percent threshold needed to enter Parliament.

== Racing record ==
=== Complete WRC results ===
Year	Entrant	Car	1	2	3	4	5	6	7	8	9	10	11	12	WDC	Pts
1977	Paul Adams	Ford Escort RS1800	MON	SWE	POR	KEN	NZL; Ret	GRE	FIN	CAN	ITA	FRA	GBR		N/A	N/A
1979	Nylex Vinyltop	Ford Escort RS1800	MON	SWE	POR	KEN	GRE	NZL; 4	FIN	CAN	ITA	FRA	GBR	CIV	22nd	10
1980	GM Dealer Team New Zealand	Vauxhall Chevette 2300 HSR	MON	SWE	POR	KEN	GRC	ARG	FIN	NZL; 6	ITA	FRA	GBR	CIV	36th	6
1982	Toyota New Zealand	Toyota Starlet	MON	SWE	POR	KEN	FRA	GRC	NZL; 9	BRA	FIN	ITA	CIV	GBR	58th	2
1983	Toyota New Zealand	Toyota Starlet	MON	SWE	POR	KEN	FRA	GRC	NZL; 8	ARG	FIN	ITA	CIV	GBR	NC	0
1984	Toyota New Zealand	Toyota Corolla	MON	SWE	POR	KEN	FRA	GRE	NZL; Ret	ARG	FIN	ITA	CIV	GBR	NC	0
1985	Toyota New Zealand	Toyota Corolla GT	MON	SWE	POR	KEN	FRA	GRC	NZL; Ret	ARG	FIN	ITA	CIV	GBR	NC	0
1990	Paul Adams	Mazda 323 4WD	MON	POR	KEN	FRA	GRC	NZL; 21	ARG	FIN	AUS	ITA	CIV	GBR	NC	0
