= Gerry Eckhoff =

New Zealand politician

Gerrard Mortland "Gerry" Eckhoff is a former New Zealand politician, having served as an ACT New Zealand Member of Parliament.

== Member of Parliament ==
New Zealand Parliament
Years	Term	Electorate	List	Party
1999–2002	46th	List	9	ACT
2002–2005	47th	List	8	ACT

He was first elected to Parliament as a list MP in the 1999 election, having been ranked ninth on ACT party list. In the 2002 election, he was ranked eighth, and remained in Parliament.

He was an ACT party spokesperson on agriculture, fisheries, forestry, biosecurity, rural affairs and land use issues. He remained a list MP until the 2005 election, in which he was again ranked eighth, but only two ACT MPs were returned.

== Outside Parliament ==
Eckhoff was working for the Meat Industry Excellence Group for a while, but he resigned in April 2013 over differences in strategy.

Eckhoff farms sheep and beef in the high country near Roxburgh, Central Otago.
