= Marc Alexander =

New Zealand politician

Marc Alexander is a New Zealand politician. He was elected to Parliament as a list MP for the United Future New Zealand party in 2002, and stood unsuccessfully as the National Party candidate for Wigram in 2008.

== Public activities ==
New Zealand Parliament
Years	Term	Electorate	List	Party
2002–2005	47th	List	4	United Future

Before entering politics, Alexander was a restaurateur in Christchurch, and also co-hosted a cooking program on local television. He authored "From a Grasshut to the Beehive (2005)" – a politically incorrect cookbook. He was also a spokesperson for the Sensible Sentencing Trust, a group which lobbies for reforms in the criminal justice system. He was then their Crime Prevention spokesperson. After the 2005 general election, Alexander left the United Future Party, where many thought his atheistic, libertarian views clashed with the social conservatism of the majority (not to mention the willingness of the Party to support a Labour-led government). Although he voted against both the Prostitution Reform Act and the Civil Union Act (two pieces of legislation strongly opposed by Christian groups), he claims he did so due to concerns over the effects of the legislation as written, rather than any ideological opposition.

Since leaving the United Future Party, Alexander has been an involved member of the National Party in Christchurch. He served as Policy Chairman for Wigram, and also edited the Canterbury/Westland policy newsletter 'Thinking National'. He was selected as the National Party candidate for Wigram in the 2008 general election, and was placed 61st on the party's list. At this time he resigned his position with Sensible Sentencing, since the Trust's rules require all spokespeople to be politically unaligned.

Alexander writes "Marc My Words", an occasional political column, for the online New Zealand news website Scoop and has a daily political opinion spot on Coromandel FM called 'Marc My Word'. He lives in Christchurch with his wife Angelika Frank-Alexander and son.

In June 2019 Alexander became the leader of the New NZ Party, founded by David Moffett.
