= Sue Bradford =

New Zealand activist, academic, and former politician

Dr Sue Bradford
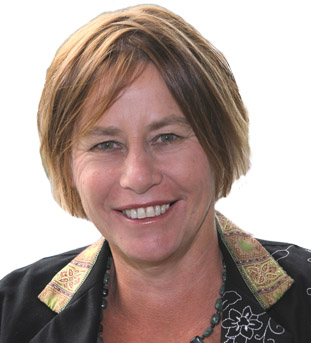

Member of the New Zealand Parliament for Green Party List
- In office 27 November 1999 – 30 October 2009
- Succeeded by: David Clendon (Note: Normally, list MPs do not have individual predecessors or successors, but Bradford resigned during a sitting parliament and therefore was succeeded by Clendon.)

Personal details
- Born: 1 July 1952 (age 74)
- Party: Green Party (1990–2011); Mana Party (2011–2014)

Sue Bradford (born 1 July 1952 in Auckland) is a New Zealand activist, academic, and former New Zealand politician who served as a list Member of Parliament representing the Green Party from 1999 to 2009.

Bradford is an eco-socialist. In 2019, she penned an op-ed stating her reluctance to vote for the Green Party in the future. She criticised the party from the left in regards to her opinion that the party underwent a centrist direction under the leadership of James Shaw and Marama Davidson. Bradford had previously run for the leadership of the Greens on a left-wing platform, losing to Metiria Turei in 2009.

== Early life ==
Sue Bradford graduated from the University of Auckland in History and Political Studies, and later obtained an MA in Chinese. Furthering her academic education she undertook postgraduate study at the University of Canterbury where she received a diploma in journalism, and a PhD in Public Policy at Auckland University of Technology. The title of her doctoral thesis was: A major left wing think tank in Aotearoa: An impossible dream or a call to action?, and the work was supervised by Marilyn Waring and Judy McGregor.

Bradford admitted in 2000 she has countless convictions.

Bradford was trespassed from Parliament in 1998.

== Member of Parliament ==
New Zealand Parliament
Years	Term	Electorate	List	Party
1999–2002	46th	List	4	Green
2002–2005	47th	List	3	Green
2005–2008	48th	List	3	Green
2008–2009	49th	List	3	Green

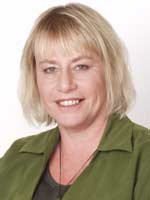
Bradford in the early 2000s

As a member of the Green Party, Bradford first won election to the Parliament as a list MP in the 1999 election. She had joined the Green Party in 1990, and had contested the 1998 Auckland mayoral election as the Green candidate. Before joining the Greens, she worked actively in the NewLabour Party, and served as its vice-president from 1989 to 1990.

As of 2005 Bradford was the Green Party spokesperson on ACC, Agriculture, Buy Kiwi-Made, Community and Voluntary Sector, Community Economic Development, Gambling, Housing, Industrial Relations, Internal Affairs, Mental Health, National Library and Archives, Racing, Regional Development, Rural Affairs, Small Business and Social Development.

The New Zealand Herald selected Bradford as Backbencher of the Year for 2000.

Bradford has successfully pushed through three member's bills: removing the defence of "reasonable force" when corporally punishing or smacking children; letting mothers in jail keep their babies for longer; and making the adult minimum wage apply to 16- and 17-year-olds. It is considered an achievement for a backbench MP to pass a single member's bill, let alone three.

In 2009 Sue Bradford ran unsuccessfully against Metiria Turei to replace Jeanette Fitzsimons for the co-leadership of the Green Party. On 25 September 2009, Bradford announced her intention to resign as a Member of Parliament in late October, citing her disappointment at the loss and wish to take new directions. Bradford regretted not becoming a Cabinet Minister, especially a Minister of Housing and Social Development.

=== Child discipline bill ===
In 2005, a parliamentary ballot allowed the discussion of Bradford's member's bill, the Crimes (Abolition of Force as a Justification for Child Discipline) Amendment Bill 2005. The Bill proposed amending Section 59 of the Crimes Act 1961 to remove the legal defence of "reasonable force" for parents prosecuted for assault on their children. The Bill passed the select committee stage and its second parliamentary reading with a huge majority, and became law after it passed its third reading 113 to 8 on 16 May 2007. The Bill occasioned widespread debate largely due its depiction as an "anti-smacking" bill, and a movement led by Family First New Zealand called a citizens initiated referendum on the issue.

In one reaction to the Bill, threats were made against Bradford on the "CYFS Watch" website. After the Ministry of Social Development complained about the threats, Google shut down the website. Further death threats were made against her in August 2009.

== After Parliament ==
Soon after Bradford's announcement of her resignation, Manukau mayor, Len Brown, suggested that she run to be a councillor on the Auckland Council. Bradford said that she would consider the idea but did not run.

She joined the Mana Party in 2011, and was a losing candidate for the Waitakere seat at the 2011 New Zealand general election.

In May 2014, Bradford resigned from the Mana Party in response to the formation of an alliance with the Internet Party.

Since October 2014 she has been coordinator at Auckland Action Against Poverty. In 2015, on completion of her PhD thesis, she spearheaded the formation of the left wing think tank Economic and Social Research Aotearoa (ESRA).

In 2017, journalist Jenny Chamberlain published a biography of Bradford: Constant Radical – The Life and Times of Sue Bradford.

In 2025, Bradford was one of 10 women MPs from across the political spectrum to serve on the People's Select Committee, a committee organised by former National MP Marilyn Waring to take submissions on pay equity changes made by the Sixth National Government of New Zealand.
