= 1964 New Year Honours (New Zealand) =

Annual awards for New Zealanders

The 1964 New Year Honours in New Zealand were appointments by Elizabeth II on the advice of the New Zealand government to various orders and honours to reward and highlight good works by New Zealanders. The awards celebrated the passing of 1963 and the beginning of 1964, and were announced on 1 January 1964.

The recipients of honours are displayed here as they were styled before their new honour.

== Knight Bachelor ==
- Woolf Fisher – of Auckland. For public services, particularly in connection with the development of industry.
- The Honourable Thaddeus Pearcey McCarthy – a judge of the Court of Appeal of New Zealand.

== Order of Saint Michael and Saint George ==
=== Companion (CMG) ===
- Frederick Raymond Macken – commissioner of Inland Revenue.
- Major Neill Aylmer Rattray MBE JP – of South Canterbury. For public services, particularly as president of the New Zealand Counties Association.

== Order of the British Empire ==
=== Knight Commander (KBE) ===
Civil division

- Andrew Linton CBE – chairman of the New Zealand Dairy Production and Marketing Board.
- The Honourable Sir Alfred Kingsley North QC – president of the New Zealand Court of Appeal.
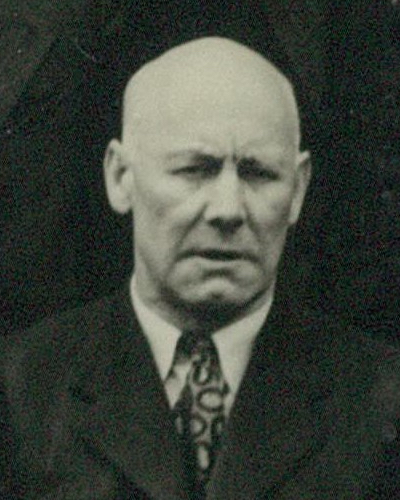
Andrew Linton

=== Commander (CBE) ===
Civil division

- The Reverend George Irvine Laurenson – general superintendent of Home and Māori Missions in the Methodist Church.
- Herbert Leslie Longbottom – of Dunedin. For services to industry and education.
- William Henry Nankervis JP – of Wellington. For services to local government.
- Ivor Prichard – chief judge of the Māori Land Court.

Military division

- Brigadier Allan Huia Andrews OBE – adjutant-general, New Zealand Army.
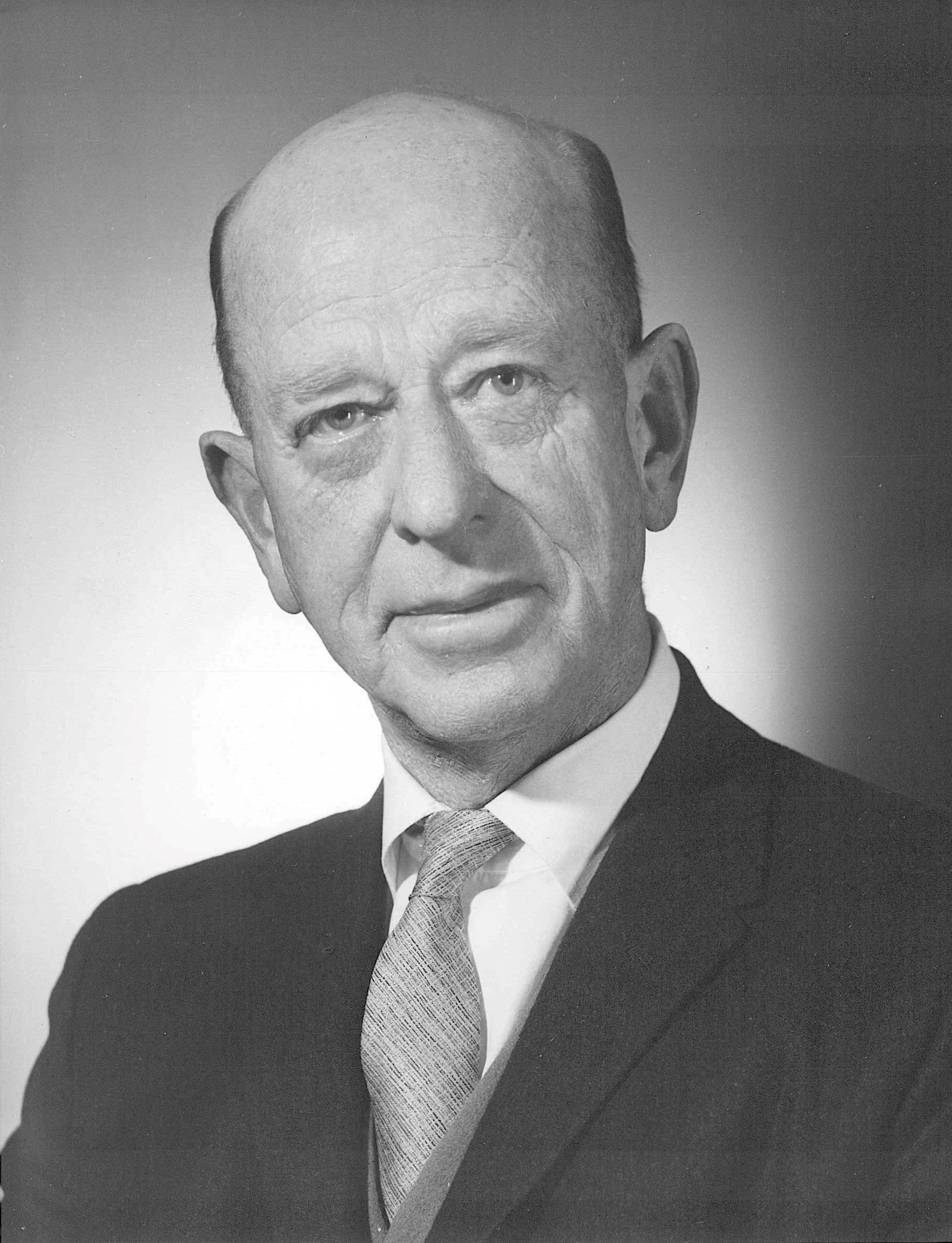
Harry Nankervis

=== Officer (OBE) ===
Civil division

- Harry Heaton Barker – mayor of Gisborne.
- Arthur Walter Christmas – of Auckland. For services in the administration of company law.
- Frederick William Coombs – president of the Palmerston North Returned Services' Association.
- Allan Thomson Aorangi Fisher. For services to the community and education, particularly as chairman of the Southland Education Board.
- Charles Alexander Fleming – of Wellington. senior principal scientific officer, Geological Survey, Department of Scientific and Industrial Research.
- Rupert Selwyn Australia Graham MB FRCSEd – of Hamilton. For services to medicine.
- Gilbert Alexander Lawrence JP – of Wellington. For services to science.
- Te Rangiataahua Kiniwe Royal MC – of Rotorua. For services to the Māori people.
- Edith Lamb Wilson JP – of Wellington. For services to the community.
- Ivon Vernon Wilson. For services to the community, particularly as president of the Southland Progress League.

Military division

- Commander Cecil Francis Cutts – Royal New Zealand Navy.
- Lieutenant-Colonel Leslie Arthur Pearce MBE – New Zealand Regiment (Regular Force).
- Wing Commander John Percival Conyers-Brown – Royal New Zealand Air Force.

=== Member (MBE) ===
Civil division

- Norman Leon Bensemann JP – of Tākaka. For services to local government.
- Mavis Elizabeth Byres – of Marton. For services to nursing.
- Kathleen Emily Duxfield – of Horotiu. For services to the community, especially in connection with the New Zealand Red Cross Society.
- Alice Annie Greenslade – of Dunedin. For philanthropic services.
- Maata Te Hui Huinga Hirini – of Hastings. For services to the community, particularly as Dominion president of the Māori Women's Welfare League.
- William Robert Hopcroft JP – of Palmerston North. For services to local government.
- Arthur James Hartley Kirkham JP – of Gisborne. For services to local government.
- Leonard Francis Walter Lovell JP – of New Plymouth. For services to the community and local government.
- Joan Stewart MacCormick. For services to the community, particularly as President of the Auckland Red Cross Society.
- Maurice Henry McGlashen – of Nelson. For services to the community and local government
- Mona Christina McIntyre – of Invercargill. For services to the community.
- Isaac Grundy Mack – mayor of Papakura.
- Roy Gordon Murdoch JP. For services to local government, especially as chairman of the North Auckland Electric Power Board.
- Ernest Ormrod – of Wellington. For services in the field of music, especially as president of the New Zealand Brass Bands Association.
- Christabel Elizabeth Robinson – of Christchurch. For services to the community, especially as secretary of the Canterbury Sheltered Workshop Association.
- Violet Augusta Roche – of Auckland. For services to the community, especially in connection with Dr Barnado's Homes.
- Nellie Winifred Bernice Schroder – of Marlborough. For services to the community, especially in connection with the Women's Division of Federated Farmers.

Military division

- Lieutenant Harry Lewis Douglas Anthony Gee – Royal New Zealand Navy.
- Warrant Officer Class I John William Benge – Royal New Zealand Army Service Corps (Regular Force).
- Major Jack Harvey – Royal New Zealand Army Ordnance Corps (Regular Force).
- Major (temporary) Edward Gale Latter – Royal New Zealand Infantry Corps (Territorial Force).
- Major Erl Travice Pleasants ED – New Zealand Territorial Force (Retired List).
- Flight Lieutenant Rodney Greville Williams DFC – Royal New Zealand Air Force.
- Warrant Officer James Arthur Moulynox – Royal New Zealand Air Force.
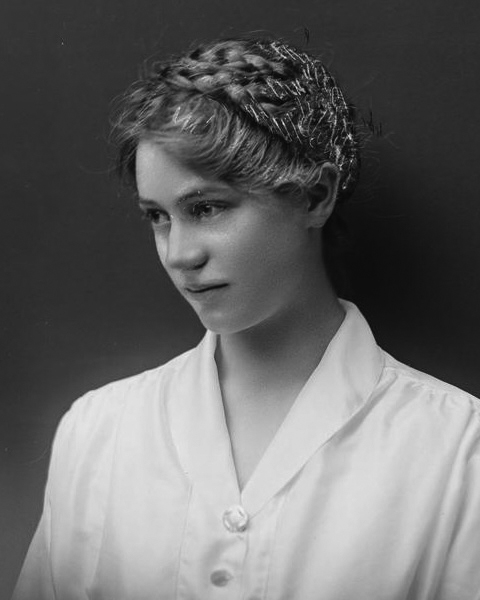
Christabel Robinson

== British Empire Medal (BEM) ==
Civil division

- Raymond Vernon Petrowski – constable, New Zealand Police Force.
- George Henry Tancock – supervising electrical technician, HMNZ Dockyard, Auckland.

Military division

- Chief Engine Room Artificer Peter John Hyde – Royal New Zealand Navy.
- Chief Petty Officer Frank Herbert Jefferies – Royal New Zealand Naval Volunteer Reserve.
- Chief Petty Officer Bernard Thomas Price – Royal New Zealand Navy.
- Chief Radio Supervisor Victor John Stuart-St Clair – Royal New Zealand Navy.
- Warrant Officer Class II (temporary) Mabin Keith Brown – Royal New Zealand Infantry Corps (Territorial Force).
- Staff-Sergeant Ronald Charles Lee – Royal New Zealand Armoured Corps (Regular Force).
- Sergeant Lindsay John Richardson – New Zealand Army Education Corps (Regular Force).
- Sergeant Lawrence Melville Taylor – Royal New Zealand Infantry Corps (Regular Force).
- Flight Sergeant John De Voil – Royal New Zealand Air Force.
- Flight Sergeant William Francis Nelson – Royal New Zealand Air Force.

== Air Force Cross (AFC) ==
- Squadron Leader Bruce Allan Wood – Royal New Zealand Air Force.
- Master Signaller Harold John Grainger – Royal New Zealand Air Force.

== Queen's Fire Service Medal (QFSM) ==
- Charles Cuthbert Knight – chief fire officer, Geraldine Volunteer Fire Brigade.
- John Philp – chief fire officer, Invercargill Fire Brigade.

== Queen's Police Medal (QPM) ==
- Hans Otto Lauritz Hansen – superintendent, New Zealand Police Force.
- Gordon Allen Howes – assistant commissioner, New Zealand Police Force.

== Queen's Commendation for Valuable Service in the Air ==
- Flight Lieutenant John Douglas Lack – Royal New Zealand Air Force.
- Flight Lieutenant Henry John Coventry – Royal New Zealand Air Force.
