= George Hawkins (politician) =

New Zealand politician

The Honourable George Hawkins QSO
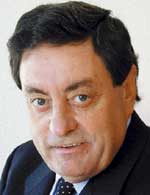

29th Minister of Internal Affairs
- In office 13 November 2000 – 19 October 2005
- Prime Minister: Helen Clark
- Preceded by: Mark Burton
- Succeeded by: Rick Barker

33rd Minister of Police
- In office 10 December 1999 – 19 October 2005
- Prime Minister: Helen Clark
- Preceded by: Clem Simich
- Succeeded by: Annette King

Member of the New Zealand Parliament for Manurewa
- In office 27 October 1990 – 26 November 2011
- Preceded by: Roger Douglas
- Succeeded by: Louisa Wall

Personal details
- Born: George Warren Hawkins; 1946 (age 79–80) Mount Eden, Auckland, New Zealand
- Party: Labour
- Profession: Schoolteacher

George Warren Hawkins QSO (born 1946) is a New Zealand local government politician and former Labour Party Member of Parliament.

Hawkins held public office for 36 years. He was Mayor of Papakura from 1983 to 1992, the Member of Parliament for Manurewa from 1990 to 2011, and a member on the Manurewa and Papakura local boards from 2010 to 2019. Between 1999 and 2005, he served as Minister of Police, Minister of Civil Defence, Minister of Internal Affairs, and Minister of Ethnic Affairs in the Fifth Labour Government.

== Early life and family ==
Hawkins was born on 15 May 1946 in the Auckland suburb of Mt Eden. He has two brothers.

He attended Dominion Road Primary School, Mount Albert Grammar School (1960–1963) and then Auckland Teachers' College. Before entering politics, he was an art teacher at Rosehill College and had also been a photographer for the Auckland Star newspaper. He later became a company director.

Hawkins met his wife, Jan, at teacher's college. They have two sons. The eldest, also named George Hawkins, is an elected member on the Papakura Local Board. Their youngest son died in an accident in 1989.

== Early political career ==
In the 1970s Hawkins became an anti-nuclear activist and he joined the Labour Party. He became chair of Labour's Papakura branch. In early 1977 he stood as a candidate for the Labour Party nomination in the Mangere by-election, but he lost out to future prime minister David Lange. Later that year Hawkins stood for the nomination for the nearby seat of Papatoetoe, but was again unsuccessful.

Alongside Geoff Braybrooke, Hawkins unsuccessfully contested a seat on the Papakura City Council in 1974. He tried again in 1977 and in a by-election thereafter, but was not successful until the 1980 election.

== Mayor of Papakura ==
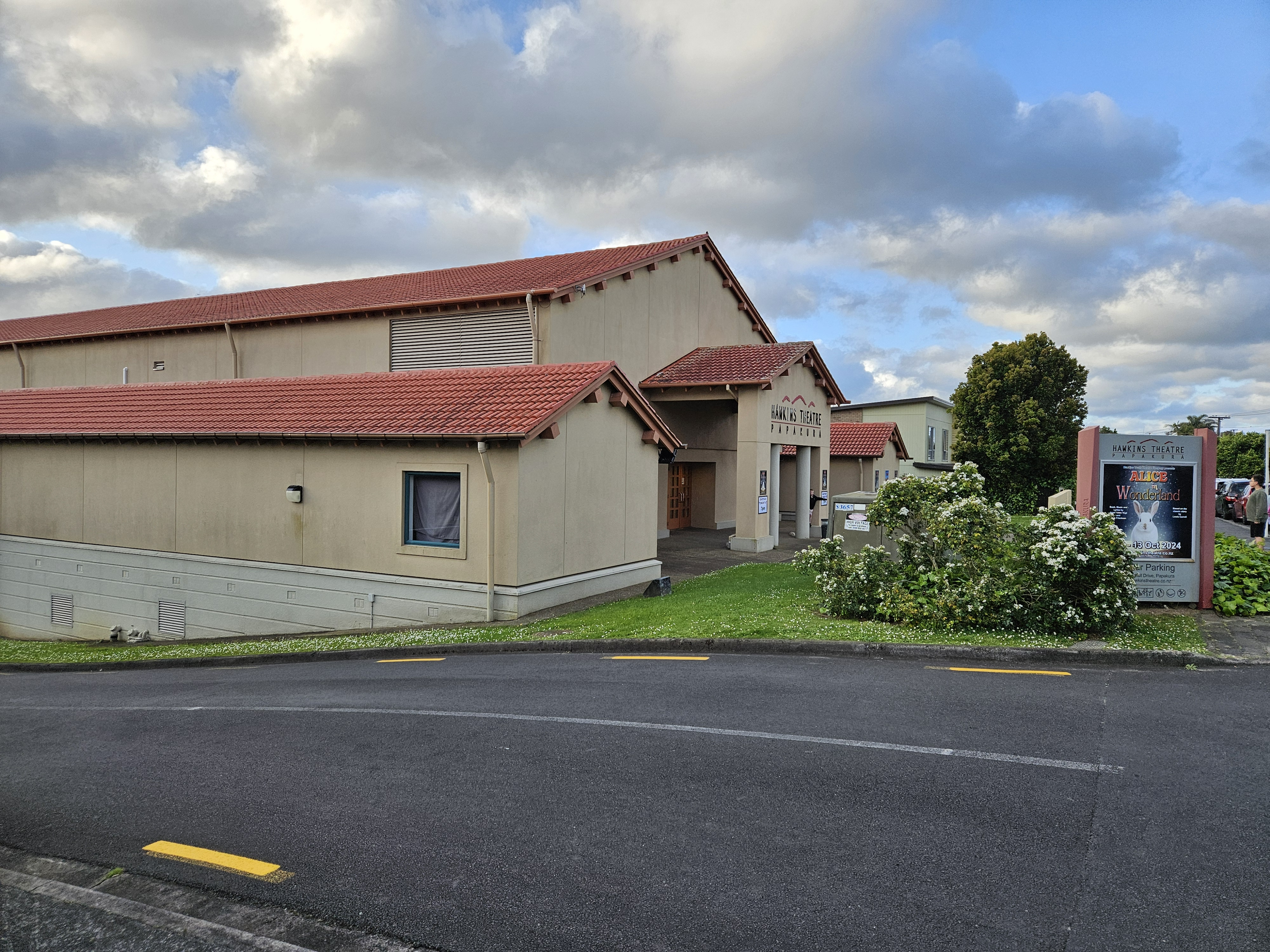
The Hawkins Theatre in Papakura

After a three-year term as a councillor, Hawkins was elected Mayor of Papakura in 1983. He was elected unopposed to his third term as mayor, of the enlarged Papakura district, in 1989, and was succeeded by his brother, David, in 1992.

As mayor, Hawkins advocated for a toll free telephone exchange between South Auckland and Auckland City. While he was a supporter of the fluoridation of water, he voted to remove fluoride from the Papakura water supply in 1987 in line with the outcome of a community referendum. In 1990, Hawkins instigated the building of a theatre in Papakura, later named the Hawkins Theatre.

== Member of Parliament ==
New Zealand Parliament
Years	Term	Electorate	List	Party
1990–1993	43rd	Manurewa		Labour
1993–1996	44th	Manurewa		Labour
1996–1999	45th	Manurewa	none	Labour
1999–2002	46th	Manurewa	none	Labour
2002–2005	47th	Manurewa	15	Labour
2005–2008	48th	Manurewa	none	Labour
2008–2011	49th	Manurewa	none	Labour

=== Opposition, 1990–1999 ===
In 1990 Hawkins was selected to succeed Roger Douglas as the Labour candidate for the seat of Manurewa, beating Alan Johnson, a town planner and opponent of Douglas. He served as MP for Manurewa from when he was first elected to Parliament in the 1990 general election until his retirement in 2011.

Hawkins was perceived to be among the right wing of the Labour Party. In his maiden statement, he praised Douglas and Michael Bassett, and the economic and local government reforms they oversaw during the previous administration. He also proposed the relocation of New Zealand's parliament from Wellington to Auckland. Labour leader Mike Moore appointed Hawkins as the party's spokesperson for local government and urban affairs; he was also assigned to the internal affairs and local government committee and the planning and development committee. Between 1993 and 1999, he was police spokesperson and sat on the justice and law reform committee.

Through the 1990s, he was aligned with Mike Moore and Phil Goff and was part of their attempted coup to relieve Helen Clark of the Labour leadership in 1996. With them, he formulated the Labour Party's tougher law and order policies that were taken into the 1999 election, which included zero-tolerance policies proposing that district commanders be sacked if they fail to meet crime-reduction targets. As police spokesperson, Hawkins was critical of the development and cost overruns of the Integrated National Crime Information System (INCIS), which was eventually abandoned in 1999.

In July 1992 Hawkins was hospitalized suffering from an infection and exhaustion. While in hospital he suffered a pulmonary embolism, leading him to an extended convalescence. He later decided to retire from the Papakura mayoralty to ease his workload. During the period he suffered a stroke, which would leave him with a speech impediment. At the time Hawkins (and others) thought bad health would end his career. He continued on, however, stating "But it [his condition] made me think that some things are really worth fighting for."

=== Minister in the Fifth Labour Government ===
Hawkins was appointed Minister of Police, Minister of Civil Defence, and Minister of Ethnic Affairs in December 1999. He was additionally appointed Minister of Internal Affairs in November 2000 and, in lieu of the ethnic affairs portfolio, Minister of Veterans' Affairs after the 2002 general election. Hawkins' tenure as minister ran through until after the 2005 general election, when he opted not to continue.

As police minister, Hawkins oversaw a crackdown on burglary. In 2000, he ordered police to respond to burglaries within 24 hours and introduced new legislation enabling police to conduct DNA testing of burglary suspects and collect fingerprints of children aged 10 and over without parental consent. The fingerprint proposal was criticised by Hawkins' colleague, junior minister Tariana Turia. Early reports indicated that the burglary policies were having some success despite not meeting the targets set, but violent crime continued to rise. Hawkins suggested that the rise in crime was an effect of the previous government's stricter social welfare policies. In 2001 Hawkins appointed the first woman and first civilian deputy police commissioner, Lyn Provost. In 2002, amid a shortage of police in Auckland, he announced plans to hire civilians to respond to burglaries.

Hawkins was also criticised for being too involved in police operations, which are supposed to be independent of politicians, including for suggesting police trainees pay their own way, banning police officers from carrying cell phones, giving directions on the investigation into the murders of Ben Smart and Olivia Hope, and determining what colours to paint police cars. A new police amendment bill proposed the police minister to have greater powers of direction over the police commissioner. Police association president Greg O'Connor described the bill as "compromising the ability of police to act independently." The bill was eventually abandoned.

Hawkins received responsibility for citizenship as associate internal affairs minister in July 2000 and was assigned the full portfolio that November. The reshuffle gave him responsibility for the New Zealand Fire Service, in addition to the police and civil defence. He initiated a review of the fire service in 2004, which had been described as "financially ailing" with a $100m funding shortfall in 2001. Hawkins was also responsible for gambling and building regulations. He was seen as "pro-gaming" but progressed government policy to prevent the building of any new casinos in New Zealand and established a new Gambling Commission. Despite initially obfuscating on the issue, he commissioned an inquiry into the leaky homes crisis in September 2002 and established a mediation service for victims of the crisis in October 2002. When it was revealed he had known about the crisis for several months before taking any action, there were calls for his resignation; eventually responsibility for the issue was reassigned to the commerce minister, Lianne Dalziel.

Hawkins also came under further pressure in the police portfolio in 2004 and 2005 when issues with the police 111 telephone system were reported, when senior officers were accused of sexual misconduct, and when large amounts of pornography were discovered on police hard drives. Ahead of the 2005 general election, Hawkins—despite being the 11th-ranked cabinet minister—was placed 25th on the Labour Party list in what was described as a "clear message" about his future with the party after the election. In response, Hawkins withdrew his name from the party list, won his Manurewa electorate by a 12,000-vote margin, and proactively ended his ministerial career by issuing a post-election statement that he would not accept reappointment as a minister.

=== Later parliamentary career ===
After withdrawing from the ministry in 2005, Hawkins became a backbencher, sitting on the finance and expenditure committee, the government administration committee, and the social services committee. Audrey Young of The New Zealand Herald reported that Hawkins was regarded by colleagues as a quiet maverick, asking written questions of ministers in the same manner that Opposition MPs would do.

In June 2008, Hawkins introduced the Sale of Liquor (Objections to Applications) Amendment Bill. The bill aimed to address over-consumption of alcohol by enabling communities to challenge liquor licensing applications. Hawkins was successful in having the bill introduced into Parliament without a ballot, and it was referred to the social services committee on 2 July 2008. The bill returned to the House for its second reading in 2010, where it was defeated when the government preferred to consider that proposal in its own alcohol reform bill. Speaking on the bill, Hawkins said he had changed his position on alcohol over his career and, having voted for the alcohol purchase age to be 18 in 1999, would instead vote for the age to be 20.

Hawkins twice, in 2005 and 2010, introduced legislation on behalf of Manukau City Council (later Auckland Council) to more strongly regulate street prostitution within its district. Both bills were defeated, with the select committee that considered the second bill determining that it was not required because councils could already create by-laws related to prostitution.

Calls for Hawkins to retire continued after he left the ministry. These intensified in 2007 when Hawkins took two months off to have an operation for bowel cancer. He believed many in the Labour Party coveted his safe electorate seat and stated of many of the visitors he received in hospital: "They didn't want to hold your hand, they wanted to take your pulse." With Daniel Newman, who worked in his local office, Hawkins lobbied to make boundary changes ahead of the 2008 general election that were intended to improve his already strong majority in Manurewa. The changes also made the nearby seats of Botany and Papakura safer for the National Party. At the election, Hawkins' majority was cut by more than half.

Following the defeat of the Labour government in 2008, Hawkins was appointed housing spokesperson by Clark's successor as leader, Phil Goff. In a 2009 reshuffle, he was reassigned to the local government portfolio. In the 2008–2011 term, Hawkins sat as a member of the primary production committee, the local government and environment committee, and the Auckland governance legislation committee.

In 2010, Hawkins announced his run for a seat on the new Manurewa Local Board and said if he was successful he would resign from Parliament. After winning the seat, he refused to say whether he would force a by-election or simply retire at the 2011 general election. Hawkins threatened to call a by-election if an EPMU-backed candidate was selected over his preferred successor. Initially, Hawkins favoured Labour list MP Shane Jones but later gave his allegiance to his former advisor Ian Dunwoodie. In the end, Louisa Wall won the nomination with Hawkins' blessing and he retired from Parliament at the election, giving his valedictory statement on 29 September 2011.

== Local board member ==
In 2010 Hawkins returned to local government when he was elected a member of the Manurewa Local Board on the Manurewa Action Team ticket. He won a second term at the 2013 local elections before changing to Papakura Action Team ticket to successfully contest the Papakura Local Board in 2016. He retired in 2019 and was succeeded on the board by his son, George Hawkins.

== Honours and awards ==
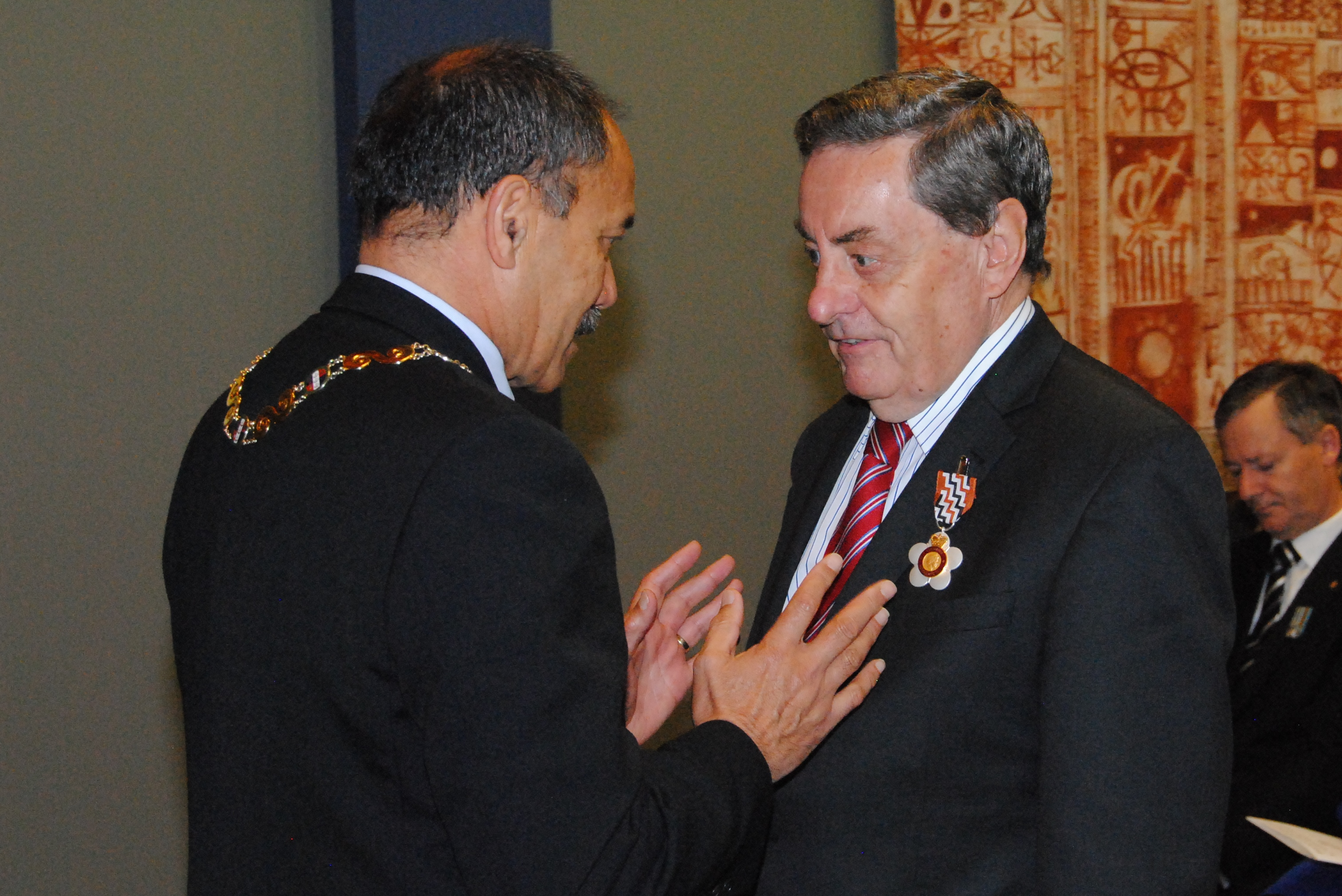
Hawkins (right), after his investiture as a Companion of the Queen's Service Order by the governor-general, Sir Jerry Mateparae, at Government House, Auckland, on 8 May 2013

On 15 December 2005, Hawkins was granted retention of the title The Honourable, in recognition of his term as a member of the Executive Council.

In the 2013 New Year Honours, Hawkins was appointed a Companion of the Queen's Service Order for services as a member of Parliament.

Political offices
Preceded by Mark Burton	Minister of Internal Affairs; 2000–2005	Succeeded by Rick Barker
Preceded by Clem Simich	Minister of Police; 1999–2005	Succeeded by Annette King
Preceded by Jack Farrell	Mayor of Papakura; 1983–1992	Succeeded by David Hawkins
New Zealand Parliament
Preceded by Roger Douglas	Member of Parliament for Manurewa; 1990–2011	Succeeded by Louisa Wall
