= Brent Catchpole =

New Zealand politician

Brent Catchpole is a New Zealand politician. He is a member of New Zealand First and served as president of the party.

== Professional life ==
Before entering politics, Catchpole worked first as an accountant and then as a marketing director for a tourism company. He now works as a political lobbying consultant. In 2015 he was elected party president of New Zealand First.

== Political career ==
=== Member of Parliament ===
New Zealand Parliament
Years	Term	Electorate	List	Party
2002–2005	47th	List	13	NZ First

He was elected to Parliament as a list MP in the 2002 election, but lost his seat in the 2005 election. He was his party's spokesperson on Communications & IT, Environment, Biosecurity, Internal Affairs, and Tourism portfolios.

=== Local body politics ===
In 2007 he was elected to the Papakura District Council in the Ardmore ward. He had also contested the Papakura mayoralty that year, but placed third behind Calum Penrose, who was successful, and the incumbent John Robertson.

In the 2010 local body elections, he stood for the Papakura Local Board and the Counties Manukau District Health Board. He was successful with the local board, but unsuccessful with the District Health Board.

Catchpole was re-elected to the Papakura Local Board at the 2016 Auckland elections and again at the 2019 Auckland elections.
