= Manurewa (electorate) =

- Single-member general constituency for the New Zealand House of Representatives
- Interactive map of boundaries from the 2026 election
- Formation: 1963
- Region: Auckland
- Character: Suburban
- Term: 3 years

Member for Manurewa
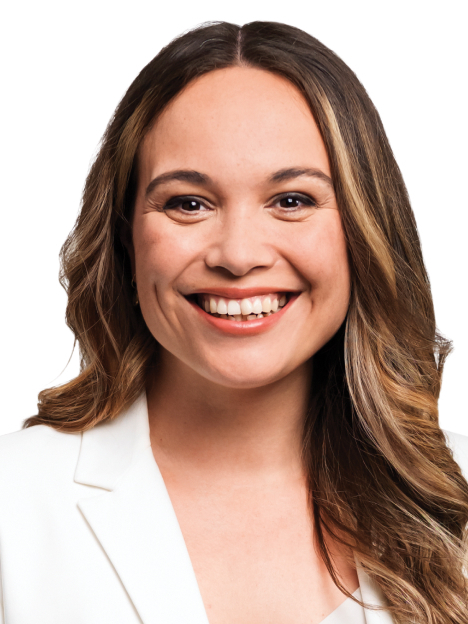
- Arena Williams since 17 October 2020
- Party: Labour
- Previous MP: Louisa Wall (Labour)
Party vote distribution

Manurewa is a New Zealand parliamentary electorate in southern Auckland. A very safe Labour seat, the seat was created in 1963 and has returned a National MP only once, in 1975. Arena Williams has represented the electorate since the 2020 election.

== Population centres ==
The electorate is based around the suburb of Manurewa. It includes Wiri, Manukau Central and Manukau Heights in the north and stretches south to Homai, Clendon Park, Hillpark and Weymouth.

Map of boundaries at the 2020 and 2023 general elections

In boundary changes in 2002, some areas moved to Clevedon and Manukau East electorates. In the 2007 boundary review, Wattle Downs and parts of Manurewa East moved to Papakura electorate. Boundary changes for the 2008 election made Manurewa even safer for Labour, although some party loyalists were apparently upset that this had the effect of making the neighbouring seat of Papakura less marginal and more inclined towards National. The 2013/14 redistribution did not change the boundaries further. The 2019/20 redistribution saw the electorate shift northwards, gaining the area north of Puhinui Road from Manukau East and losing the area east of the Southern Motorway to the new Takanini electorate. In the 2025 boundary review, the electorate would gain parts of Manurewa and Wattle Downs from the over-quota Takanini electorate, and part of Wiri from Mangere, while ceding an area of Papatoetoe between State Highway 20 and North Island Main Trunk to Mangere.

== History ==
Manurewa is generally regarded as a safe Labour seat. Louisa Wall won the Manurewa electorate in the 2011 election and was returned to the 50th New Zealand Parliament; she had opted not to be on Labour's party list that time. She was back on the list (in position 12) for the 2014 election but won her electorate comfortably.

=== Members of Parliament ===
Unless otherwise stated, all MPs' terms began and ended at general elections.

Key

Labour National

Election	Winner
1963 election	Phil Amos
1966 election	Phil Amos
1969 election	Phil Amos
1972 election	Phil Amos
1975 election	Merv Wellington
1978 election	Roger Douglas
1981 election	Roger Douglas
1984 election	Roger Douglas
1987 election	Roger Douglas
1990 election	George Hawkins
1993 election	George Hawkins
1996 election	George Hawkins
1999 election	George Hawkins
2002 election	George Hawkins
2005 election	George Hawkins
2008 election	George Hawkins
2011 election	Louisa Wall
2014 election	Louisa Wall
2017 election	Louisa Wall
2020 election	Arena Williams
2023 election	Arena Williams
2026 election	Arena Williams

=== List MPs ===
Members of Parliament elected from party lists in elections where that person also unsuccessfully contested the Manurewa electorate. Unless otherwise stated, all MPs terms began and ended at general elections.

Election	Winner
2009^{1}	Cam Calder
2011 election	Cam Calder

^{1}Calder became an MP on the resignation of Richard Worth in June 2009.

== Election results ==
=== 2026 election ===
The next election will be held on 7 November 2026. Candidates for Manurewa are listed at Candidates in the 2026 New Zealand general election by electorate § Manurewa. Official results will be available after 27 November 2026.

=== 2023 election ===
2023 general election: Manurewa
Notes:	Blue background denotes the winner of the electorate vote. Pink background denotes a candidate elected from their party list. Yellow background denotes an electorate win by a list member, or other incumbent. A ✓ or ✗ denotes status of any incumbent, win or lose respectively.						
Party	Candidate	Votes	%	±%	Party votes	%	±%
Labour	✓ Arena Williams	16,261	55.95	–14.18	15,623	51.53	–21.23
National	Siva Kilari	9,148	31.47	+19.22	8,808	29.05	+16.24
Te Pāti Māori	Rangi McLean	1,604	5.51	–	632	2.08	+1.28
Vision NZ	Caine Warren	991	3.40	+2.35			
Green					1,777	5.86	+2.89
NZ First					1,037	3.41	+0.59
ACT					806	2.65	+0.95
Freedoms NZ					362	1.20	–
NewZeal					233	0.76	+0.50
Opportunities					179	0.59	+0.14
NZ Loyal					137	0.45	–
Legalise Cannabis					136	0.44	–0.01
New Conservatives					56	0.19	–1.46
Animal Justice					48	0.15	–
New Nation					39	0.12	–
Women's Rights					39	0.12	–
DemocracyNZ					18	0.05	–
Leighton Baker Party					14	0.04	–
Informal votes		1,058			369		
Total valid votes		29,062			30,313		
Labour hold	Majority	7,113	24.47	–33.41			

=== 2020 election ===
2020 general election: Manurewa
Notes:	Blue background denotes the winner of the electorate vote. Pink background denotes a candidate elected from their party list. Yellow background denotes an electorate win by a list member, or other incumbent. A ✓ or ✗ denotes status of any incumbent, win or lose respectively.						
Party	Candidate	Votes	%	±%	Party votes	%	±%
Labour	Arena Williams	20,815	70.13	+12.74	22,137	72.65	+14.25
National	Nuwi Samarakone	3,636	12.25	–14.29	3,904	12.81	–15.73
NZ First	John Hall	968	3.36	–2.87	861	2.82	−3.76
Green	Lourdes Vano	963	3.24	—	907	2.97	+0.51
New Conservative	Mote Pahulu	814	2.74	+1.48	505	1.65	+1.31
Independent	Luella Linaker	325	1.09	—			
Advance NZ	Linda Jackson	313	1.05	—	250	0.82	—
Vision NZ	Sonny Wilcox	305	1.02	—	196	0.64	—
ONE	Rattan Singh	198	0.66	—	80	0.26	—
TEA	Wella Bernardo	134	0.45	—	37	0.12	—
Communist League	Annalucia Vermunt	28	0.09	—			
ACT					519	1.70	+1.44
Māori Party					245	0.80	–0.80
Opportunities					139	0.45	–0.29
Legalise Cannabis					136	0.44	+0.07
Sustainable NZ					14	0.04	—
Outdoors					9	0.02	–0.01
Heartland					8	0.02	—
Social Credit					6	0.01	—
Informal votes		1,181			515		
Total valid votes		29,680			30,468		
Turnout		30,668	69.77				
Labour hold	Majority	17,179	57.88	+27.03			

=== 2017 election ===
2017 general election: Manurewa
Notes:	Blue background denotes the winner of the electorate vote. Pink background denotes a candidate elected from their party list. Yellow background denotes an electorate win by a list member, or other incumbent. A ✓ or ✗ denotes status of any incumbent, win or lose respectively.						
Party	Candidate	Votes	%	±%	Party votes	%	±%
Labour	✓ Louisa Wall	15,577	57.39	+4.15	16,592	58.40	+5.74
National	Katrina Bungard	7,203	26.54	−2.42	8,109	28.54	+1.05
NZ First	John Hall	1,691	6.23	−1.41	1,869	6.58	−2.84
Green	Teanau Tuiono	880	3.24	−1.03	698	2.46	−1.48
Māori Party	Tasha Hohaia	806	2.97	−1.07	313	1.10	+0.41
Conservative	Elliot Ikilei	342	1.26	−0.87	98	0.34	−2.46
Opportunities					210	0.74	—
Legalise Cannabis					104	0.37	±0.00
ACT					75	0.26	−0.31
People's Party					58	0.20	—
Mana Party					22	0.08	—
United Future					15	0.05	−0.04
Democrats					12	0.04	+0.02
Outdoors					9	0.03	—
Ban 1080					7	0.02	−0.03
Internet					4	0.01	—
Informal votes		643			218		
Total valid votes		27,142			28,413		
Labour hold	Majority	8,374	30.85	+6.57			

=== 2014 election ===
2014 general election: Manurewa
Notes:	Blue background denotes the winner of the electorate vote. Pink background denotes a candidate elected from their party list. Yellow background denotes an electorate win by a list member, or other incumbent. A ✓ or ✗ denotes status of any incumbent, win or lose respectively.						
Party	Candidate	Votes	%	±%	Party votes	%	±%
Labour	✓ Louisa Wall	14,038	53.24	−10.03	14,579	52.66	−4.77
National	Simeon Brown	7,636	28.96	+2.10	7,612	27.49	+1.36
NZ First	John Hall	2,015	7.64	+3.17	2,609	9.42	+2.06
Green	Trish Tupou	1,127	4.27	+4.27	1,092	3.94	±0.00
Conservative	Elliot Ikilei	562	2.13	−0.56	776	2.80	+0.54
Mana	Yvonne Dainty	268	1.02	−0.62			
Māori Party	Raewyn Bhana	238	0.90	+0.26	191	0.69	+0.05
Internet Mana					315	1.14	+0.29 (Note: 2014 Internet Mana swing is relative to the votes for Mana in 2011; it shared a party list with Internet in the 2014 election.)
ACT					158	0.57	−0.03
Legalise Cannabis					102	0.37	−0.03
United Future					24	0.09	−0.13
Ban 1080					15	0.05	+0.05
Civilian					10	0.04	+0.04
Democrats					6	0.02	+0.01
Focus					1	0.00	+0.00
Informal votes		481			197		
Total valid votes		26,365			27,687		
Turnout		27,687	67.63	+2.53			
Labour hold	Majority	6,402	24.28	−12.13			

=== 2011 election ===
2011 general election: Manurewa
Notes:	Blue background denotes the winner of the electorate vote. Pink background denotes a candidate elected from their party list. Yellow background denotes an electorate win by a list member, or other incumbent. A ✓ or ✗ denotes status of any incumbent, win or lose respectively.						
Party	Candidate	Votes	%	±%	Party votes	%	±%
Labour	Louisa Wall	14,961	63.27	+9.31	14,517	57.43	+5.21
National	Cam Calder	6,351	26.86	−0.24	6,606	26.13	−4.20
NZ First	John Hall	1,122	4.47	+1.92	1,861	7.36	+2.83
Conservative	Richard Addis	636	2.69	+2.69	572	2.26	+2.26
Mana	Richard Shortland Cooper	387	1.64	+1.64	215	0.85	+0.85
ACT	David Peterson	189	0.80	−2.71	153	0.60	−0.43
Green					995	3.94	+1.69
Māori Party					163	0.64	−0.62
Legalise Cannabis					101	0.40	+0.05
United Future					56	0.22	−0.43
Alliance					22	0.09	+0.02
Libertarianz					13	0.05	+0.02
Democrats					3	0.01	+0.004
Informal votes		1,108			411		
Total valid votes		23,646			25,688		
Labour hold	Majority	8,610	36.41	+9.55			

Electorate (as at 26 November 2011): 39,461

=== 2008 election ===
2008 general election: Manurewa
Notes:	Blue background denotes the winner of the electorate vote. Pink background denotes a candidate elected from their party list. Yellow background denotes an electorate win by a list member, or other incumbent. A ✓ or ✗ denotes status of any incumbent, win or lose respectively.						
Party	Candidate	Votes	%	±%	Party votes	%	±%
Labour	✓ George Hawkins	13,511	53.96		13,673	52.22	
National	Cam Calder	6,785	27.10		7,941	30.33	
Pacific	Vui K Sapa'u Vitale	1,138	4.55		909	3.47	
Green	Alan Johnson	963	3.85		588	2.25	
ACT	Michael James Bailey	879	3.51		633	2.42	
NZ First	John Hall	707	2.82		1,187	4.53	
Family Party	Richard Lewis	514	2.05		193	0.74	
Progressive	Sukhdev Singh Bains	263	1.05		276	1.05	
United Future	Jim Stowers	185	0.74		170	0.65	
Kiwi	Amjad Khan	92	0.37		66	0.25	
Māori Party					331	1.26	
Legalise Cannabis					92	0.35	
Bill and Ben					90	0.34	
Libertarianz					7	0.03	
RAM					7	0.03	
Workers Party					7	0.03	
RONZ					5	0.02	
Alliance					4	0.02	
Democrats					2	0.01	
Informal votes		408			220		
Total valid votes		25,037			26,181		
Labour hold	Majority	6,726	26.86	−12.38			

=== 2005 election ===
2005 general election: Manurewa
Notes:	Blue background denotes the winner of the electorate vote. Pink background denotes a candidate elected from their party list. Yellow background denotes an electorate win by a list member, or other incumbent. A ✓ or ✗ denotes status of any incumbent, win or lose respectively.						
Party	Candidate	Votes	%	±%	Party votes	%	±%
Labour	✓ George Hawkins	17,759	59.66		18,254	59.11	
National	Fepulea'i Aiono	6,092	20.42		7,938	25.70	
NZ First	Lindy Palmer	1,868	6.26		1,714	5.55	
United Future	Noel Hinton	940	3.15		624	2.02	
Māori Party	Rangi McLean	819	2.75		407	1.32	
Destiny	Patrick Komene	692	2.32		387	1.25	
Progressive	Raghbir Singh	609	2.04		397	1.29	
ACT	Glen Snelgar	582	1.95		232	0.75	
Family Rights	Amelia Fepulea'i	238	0.80		105	0.34	
Alliance	Paul Protheroe	110	0.37		21	0.07	
Direct Democracy	Kelvyn Alp	85	0.28		42	0.14	
Green					603	1.95	
Legalise Cannabis					74	0.24	
Christian Heritage					50	0.16	
One NZ					10	0.03	
Libertarianz					8	0.03	
99 MP					6	0.02	
Democrats					6	0.02	
RONZ					4	0.01	
Informal votes		474			188		
Total valid votes		29,834			30,882		
Labour hold	Majority	11,707	39.24	−10.12			

=== 2002 election ===
2002 general election:Manurewa
Notes:	Blue background denotes the winner of the electorate vote. Pink background denotes a candidate elected from their party list. Yellow background denotes an electorate win by a list member, or other incumbent. A ✓ or ✗ denotes status of any incumbent, win or lose respectively.						
Party	Candidate	Votes	%	±%	Party votes	%	±%
Labour	✓ George Hawkins	15,821	62.24	−4.91	14,752	56.55	+4.71
National	Enosa Auva'a	3,273	12.88	−5.59	3,261	12.50	−12.18
NZ First	John Bryce Geary	1,881	7.40		2,658	10.19	+6.85
Green	Alan Johnson	1,193	4.69		970	3.72	+0.57
United Future	Peter Collins	994	3.91		1,443	5.53	
ACT	Bryce Bevin	992	3.90		1,332	5.11	+0.12
Christian Heritage	Daniel W Willis	546	2.15		509	1.95	−0.87
Progressive	Susi Pa'o Williams	329	1.29		550	2.11	
Alliance	Hayley Rawhiti	287	1.13		249	0.95	−5.42
Reform's Tahi	Dave Bergersen	55	0.22				
Independent	Tuporo (Tommy) Maroroa	49	0.19				
ORNZ					186	0.71	
Legalise Cannabis					141	0.54	−0.50
Mana Māori					15	0.06	+0.02
One NZ					14	0.05	0.00
NMP					5	0.02	−0.01
Informal votes		328			164		
Total valid votes		25,420			26,085		
Labour hold	Majority	12,548	49.36	+0.68			

=== 1999 election ===
1999 general election:Manurewa
Notes:	Blue background denotes the winner of the electorate vote. Pink background denotes a candidate elected from their party list. Yellow background denotes an electorate win by a list member, or other incumbent. A ✓ or ✗ denotes status of any incumbent, win or lose respectively.						
Party	Candidate	Votes	%	±%	Party votes	%	±%
Labour	✓ George Hawkins	18,018	67.15	+11.68	14,140	51.84	+13.12
National	Enosa Auva'a	4,956	18.47		6,730	24.68	−3.14
Alliance	Toia Lucas	1,168	4.35		1,737	6.37	−1.73
ACT	Lech Beltowski	880	3.28		1,361	4.99	+1.24
Christian Heritage	Uaita Levi	753	2.81		770	2.82	
NZ First	Lindy Palmer	716	2.67		911	3.34	−9.74
Mauri Pacific	Ann Batten	304	1.13		44	0.16	
Mana Wahine Te Ira Tangata	Lumã'ava Samuelu-Pula	38	0.14				
Green					859	3.15	
Legalise Cannabis					284	1.04	−0.72
Christian Democrats					164	0.60	
United NZ					71	0.26	−0.56
Libertarianz					53	0.19	+0.17
McGillicuddy Serious					42	0.15	−0.10
Animals First					40	0.15	−0.05
Natural Law					19	0.07	−0.04
One NZ					13	0.05	
Mana Māori					12	0.04	+0.03
The People's Choice					10	0.04	
NMP					9	0.03	
Republican					4	0.01	
South Island					1	0.00	
Freedom Movement					0	0.00	
Informal votes		849			408		
Total valid votes		26,833			27,274		
Labour hold	Majority	13,062	48.68	+14.75			

=== 1996 election ===
1996 general election: Manurewa
Notes:	Blue background denotes the winner of the electorate vote. Pink background denotes a candidate elected from their party list. Yellow background denotes an electorate win by a list member, or other incumbent. A ✓ or ✗ denotes status of any incumbent, win or lose respectively.						
Party	Candidate	Votes	%	±%	Party votes	%	±%
Labour	✓ George Hawkins	14,015	55.47		9,820	38.72	
National	Les Marinkovich	5,442	21.54		7,055	27.82	
NZ First	Roger Mail	2,240	8.87		3,317	13.08	
Alliance	Willie Jackson	1,492	5.91		2,054	8.10	
Christian Coalition	Braden Matson	781	3.09		1,147	4.52	
ACT	John Thompson	555	2.20		951	3.75	
United NZ	Malcolm Hood	378	1.50		209	0.82	
McGillicuddy Serious	Derek Craig	151	0.60		64	0.25	
Green Society	Colin Amery	145	0.57		41	0.16	
Natural Law	Faye McLaren	67	0.27		29	0.11	
Legalise Cannabis					447	1.76	
Ethnic Minority Party					69	0.27	
Animals First					50	0.20	
Progressive Green					41	0.16	
Advance New Zealand					37	0.15	
Superannuitants & Youth					18	0.07	
Conservatives					4	0.02	
Libertarianz					4	0.02	
Mana Māori					3	0.01	
Asia Pacific United					2	0.01	
Te Tawharau					0	0.00	
Informal votes		209			113		
Total valid votes		25,266			25,362		
Labour hold	Majority	8,573	33.93	+10.04			

=== 1993 election ===
1993 general election: Manurewa
Party	Candidate	Votes	%	±%
Labour	George Hawkins	7,476	44.50	+0.21
National	Mark Chalmers	3,462	20.60	
Alliance	Pat Robinson	3,183	18.94	
NZ First	Don Roa	2,156	12.83	
Christian Heritage	Shane Kennedy	388	2.30	
McGillicuddy Serious	Derek Craig	135	0.80	+0.26
Majority		4,014	23.89	+16.86
Turnout		16,800	78.19	+0.29
Registered electors		21,484		

=== 1990 election ===
1990 general election: Manurewa
Party	Candidate	Votes	%	±%
Labour	George Hawkins	7,266	44.71	
National	Pat Baker	6,113	37.62	
NewLabour	Pat Robinson	1,135	6.98	
Green	Anaru Kira	1,025	6.30	
Social Credit	Debbie Elanor Stewart	251	1.54	
Democrats	Paumea Horton McKay	205	1.26	
Independent	Shirley Jane Watson	164	1.00	−0.15
McGillicuddy Serious	Derek Craig	89	0.54	
Communist League	Mike Treen	11	0.06	
Majority		1,143	7.03	
Turnout		16,249	77.90	−5.70
Registered electors		20,857		

=== 1987 election ===
1987 general election: Manurewa
Party	Candidate	Votes	%	±%
Labour	Roger Douglas	9,255	56.49	+2.04
National	George Cunningham	6,203	37.86	
Democrats	John Kilford	606	3.69	−1.18
Independent	Shirley Jane Watson	189	1.15	+0.51
NZ Party	W A Berchich	129	0.78	
Majority		3,052	18.63	−7.81
Turnout		16,382	83.60	−7.26
Registered electors		19,594		

=== 1984 election ===
1984 general election: Manurewa
Party	Candidate	Votes	%	±%
Labour	Roger Douglas	10,157	54.45	+8.49
National	Stuart Leenstra	5,224	28.00	
NZ Party	Michael Jack	2,143	11.48	
Social Credit	John Kilford	909	4.87	
Independent	Shirley Jane Watson	120	0.64	
Values	Ronald Andrew MacMillan	72	0.38	−0.44
Independent	Ritchie Hesituo Okesene	27	0.14	
Majority		4,933	26.44	+12.35
Turnout		18,652	90.86	+3.28
Registered electors		20,528		

=== 1981 election ===
1981 general election: Manurewa
Party	Candidate	Votes	%	±%
Labour	Roger Douglas	9,126	45.96	−1.46
National	Keith Ralph	6,311	31.59	
Social Credit	Paul Norman	4,371	21.88	+4.60
Values	Ronald Andrew MacMillan	165	0.82	−0.43
Majority		2,815	14.09	+0.25
Turnout		19,973	87.58	+19.89
Registered electors		22,804		

=== 1978 election ===
1978 general election: Manurewa
Party	Candidate	Votes	%	±%
Labour	Roger Douglas	8,449	47.42	
National	Peter O'Brien	5,982	33.58	
Social Credit	Paul Norman	3,079	17.28	
Values	Ronald Andrew MacMillan	224	1.25	
Independent Labour	G H Bibb	80	0.44	
Majority		2,467	13.84	
Turnout		17,814	67.69	−13.18
Registered electors		26,316		

=== 1975 election ===
1975 general election: Manurewa
Party	Candidate	Votes	%	±%
National	Merv Wellington	9,558	47.74	
Labour	Phil Amos	8,200	40.96	−12.47
Social Credit	Steve McKay	1,296	6.47	
Values	Malcolm Hardwick	925	4.62	
Alpha	Alan Filmer	21	0.10	
Independent	Jim McCullagh	11	0.05	
Democratic Labour	Allan Hughes	8	0.03	
Majority		1,358	6.78	
Turnout		20,019	80.87	−7.08
Registered electors		24,753		

=== 1972 election ===
1972 general election: Manurewa
Party	Candidate	Votes	%	±%
Labour	Phil Amos	8,221	53.43	+3.80
National	Pat Baker	5,824	37.85	−3.93
Social Credit	Jim Laurenson	872	5.66	
Values	Kenneth Hooks	287	1.86	
New Democratic	George Higham	180	1.17	−6.20
Majority		2,397	15.58	+7.73
Turnout		15,384	87.95	−0.23
Registered electors		17,490		

=== 1969 election ===
1969 general election: Manurewa
Party	Candidate	Votes	%	±%
Labour	Phil Amos	8,668	49.63	−0.10
National	Pat Baker	7,297	41.78	
Social Credit	George Higham	1,287	7.37	+0.79
Socialist Unity	Christopher Ruthe	140	0.80	
Informal votes		70	0.40	
Majority		1,371	7.85	−4.36
Turnout		17,462	88.18	−4.44
Registered electors		19,802		

=== 1966 election ===
1966 general election: Manurewa
Party	Candidate	Votes	%	±%
Labour	Phil Amos	9,725	49.73	−1.58
National	B F Kimpton	7,336	37.51	
Social Credit	George Higham	1,287	6.58	+1.13
Communist	Stan Hieatt	147	0.75	
Majority		2,389	12.21	+3.51
Turnout		19,554	83.74	−6.48
Registered electors		23,350		

=== 1963 election ===
1963 general election: Manurewa
Party	Candidate	Votes	%	±%
Labour	Phil Amos	8,988	51.31	
National	Leon Götz	7,464	42.61	
Social Credit	George Higham	956	5.45	
Communist	Hugh McLeod	109	0.62	
Majority		1,524	8.70	
Turnout		19,414	90.22	
Registered electors		19,414		
