= Neill Rattray =

New Zealand politician (1896–1964)

The Honourable Neill Rattray CMG MBE

Member of the New Zealand Legislative Council
- In office 22 June 1950 – 31 December 1950

Personal details
- Born: Neill Aylmer Rattray; 7 November 1896 Dunedin, New Zealand
- Died: 1 June 1964 (aged 67)
- Spouse: Ella Helmore (m. 1922)
- Occupation: Farmer, soldier

Neill Aylmer Rattray CMG MBE (7 November 1896 – 1 June 1964) was a member of the New Zealand Legislative Council, a farmer, and a war veteran of both world wars.

== Biography ==
Rattray was born in Dunedin on 7 November 1896. He was the son of Charles William Rattray. His middle name is the maiden name of his grandmother, Catherine Charlotte Aylmer. He received his education at Christ's College in Christchurch. In 1922, he married Ella Helmore, the daughter of George Helmore. They were to have two sons and one daughter.

In 1914 and 1915, Rattray was aide-de-camp to the governor-general, Arthur Foljambe, 2nd Earl of Liverpool. From April 1915 to 1922, he was with the Royal Irish Fusiliers, was twice wounded, and decorated with the French Croix de guerre 1914–1918. He served in France and then north-west Persia and Iraq (1920–1921). He returned to New Zealand in 1922 and commenced sheep farming in South Canterbury, settling in Waimate. In early 1940, Rattray enlisted as captain for service in World War II. In May 1941, he was captured in Greece by German forces, having since been promoted major. He left the prisoner of war camp and reached England in April 1945 and was back in New Zealand by the following July.

Rattray was chairman of the Waimate County Council for some time and a member for 23 years. He was on the Timaru Harbour Board. He was a longstanding member of many community organisations, including as president or equivalent, for example the Waimate High School board, the Pioneer Park board, the Waimate Hunt Club, the Waimate Racing Club, the Waimate A and P Association, an executive member of the New Zealand Red Cross Society, and Federated Farmers. He was appointed a member of the New Zealand Legislative Council on 22 June 1950 as a member of the suicide squad nominated by the First National Government in 1950 to vote for the abolition of the Council. Most of the new members (like Rattray) were appointed on 22 June 1950, and served until 31 December 1950 when the Council was abolished.

Rattray was appointed a Member of the Order of the British Empire (Military Division) in 1946, in recognition of gallant and distinguished services in the field during World War II. In 1953, he was awarded the Queen Elizabeth II Coronation Medal. In the 1964 New Year Honours, he was appointed a Companion of the Order of St Michael and St George, for public services, particularly as president of the New Zealand Counties Association. He died on 1 June 1964 aged 67.
