= Ministry for Ethnic Communities =

Government ministry of New Zealand

- Māori: Te Tari Mātāwaka

Agency overview
- Formed: 1 July 2021; 5 years ago
- Jurisdiction: New Zealand
- Headquarters: Grant Thornton Building, 215 Lambton Quay, Wellington 6011
- Employees: 84 FTE staff (30 September 2022)
- Minister responsible: Hon Mark Mitchell, Minister for Ethnic Communities
- Agency executive: Mervin Singham, Chief Executive
- Website: www.ethniccommunities.govt.nz

The Ministry for Ethnic Communities (Māori: Te Tari Mātāwaka) is an advisory agency to the government on ethnic diversity and inclusion in New Zealand society. The agency provides information, advice and services to ethnic communities, and gives out funds to support community development and social cohesion.

== Function ==
=== Overview ===
The government decided to form the Ministry on 2 December 2020 and formally came into existence on 1 July 2021. The origins of the Ministry stem from the Office of Ethnic Affairs, which was established as one part-time officer within the Department of Internal Affairs in 1995. The first permanent director of the Office started in 2004. The Office was renamed to the Office of Ethnic Communities in 2015.

The elevation of the Office of Ethnic Communities to a standalone ministry was a recommendation of the Royal Commission into the Christchurch mosque terror attacks The recommendation specifically recommended a Ministry to take on the responsibility of the Office of Ethnic Communities, and specifically advise the government on policy and matters related to ethnic communities, evaluate government efforts into helping ethnic communities, and identify which areas need the most help and develop a framework in order to identify the effectiveness and wider impact of policies on ethnic communities.

=== Initiatives and Goals ===
One of the main goals of the Ministry since it was created is to improve social cohesion within New Zealand for ethnic communities, making them feel more safe, included, ensuring they have equal opportunity, and are safe against any threats. With a wide range of ethnic communities making up 20% of the population, the Ministry seeks to seek equity for these communities, making sure they are empowered economically, and are able to easily and equally access government services when needed. It is also hoped that New Zealand will embrace diversity as a strength, and that will help empower ethnic communities and connect them with each other.

The Ministry engages in work with diverse and local ethnic community groups, and groups of faith, and assists in making their voices heard within local and central government. It also helps funds and support initiatives within ethnic community groups, and has supported a wide variety of events, from cultural festivals, education, and work initiatives to help build skills, to even radio programs. As of 2023, the Ministry had spent $8.4 Million for these programs, usually given out in small packages of a few thousand, as part of the Ethnic Communities Development Fund.

The Ministry has also assisted during times of crisis. During the Covid-19 pandemic, the ministry gave funds to ethnic community groups to help with communication around Covid-19, and helping keep communities safe from it. The Ministry also worked with the Ministry of Health for the Ethnic Communities Covid-19 Vaccine Uptake Fund (ECCVUF) and helped assist in improving vaccine uptake and reducing hesitancy in ethnic communities. Along with the ECCVUF, the Ministry also set up the Ethnic Communities Communication Fund with the Ministry of Health, to help ethnic communities share information around vaccination with their communities, and enable communication about vaccine information in multiple different languages and facilitate wider community engagement.

The Ministry of Ethnic Communities also assisted during flooding in Auckland, and Cyclone Gabrielle, both in 2023. They engaged in communication with Ethnic Communities to make sure their needs were met, and conducted Hui's in order to see how the response could be improved in helping those communities. They also made changes to the Ethnic Communities Development Fund, so communities could apply for that funding to assist them in more practical ways during extreme weather event, and set up a website to help ethnic communities navigate and find information easily during these weather events.

The Ministry of Ethnic Communities have also held various other initiatives to support communities. In 2022, multiple Ethnic Advantage conferences were held in order to assist and facilitate communication between different ethnic communities, and help them support and learn from each other, as well as speak on various topics. They assisted in making the 2023 Census as inclusive as possible, providing options for 27 languages, and helping support communities more directly with the Census if needed. The Ministry also collaborated with the Ministry of Health on helping the concerns and needs of Ethnic Communities be heard when it comes to health, such as providing workshop to hear concerns raging from mental health support to difficulty accessing health services.

The Ministry was also helped with the Education Review Office in to the needs of Ethnic communities in education, specifically helping them talk to communities about their children's education. The report was released as Education for All Children: Embracing Diverse Ethnicities, and helps show the changing state of New Zealand education makeup, as well as the racism and bigotry often faced by children of ethnic communities, and even isolation and a cultural gap. It provided solid evidence into the issues of racism against ethnic communities, and the Ministry notes it as being extremely important and significant as a piece of evidence into the issue.

As of May 2024, 12% of jobs at the Ministry of Ethnic Communities have been removed completely, as a result of the cuts to various ministries by the Sixth National Government of New Zealand. Various community leaders voiced opposition to the cuts, and pointed out that the Ministry's establishment and resultant efforts had been very positive.

==== Spirit of Service Awards 2022 ====
The Ministries efforts were recognized in 2022 at that years Spirit of Service awards for their part in policies with:

Special Commendation for Policy Excellence, for assisting with and implementing Covid-19 policy.

Better Outcomes Award for Afghanistan Resettlement Response, a joint agency response that helped ensure the safe arrival of 1700 Afghan refugees.

Prime Minister's Award for the Care in Community Welfare Response, part of a joint agency response to assist people through Covid-19

=== Headquarters ===
The ministry is based in the Grant Thornton building in Wellington, with regional offices in Auckland and Christchurch.

== List of chief executives ==
Chief executives of the Ministry for Ethnic Communities are:

No.	Name	Portrait	Term of office	
1	Mervin Singham		July 2021	present

== See also ==
- Christchurch mosque shootings
