= Haare Williams =

New Zealand educator, broadcaster, artist and writer

Sir Haare Williams KNZM JP
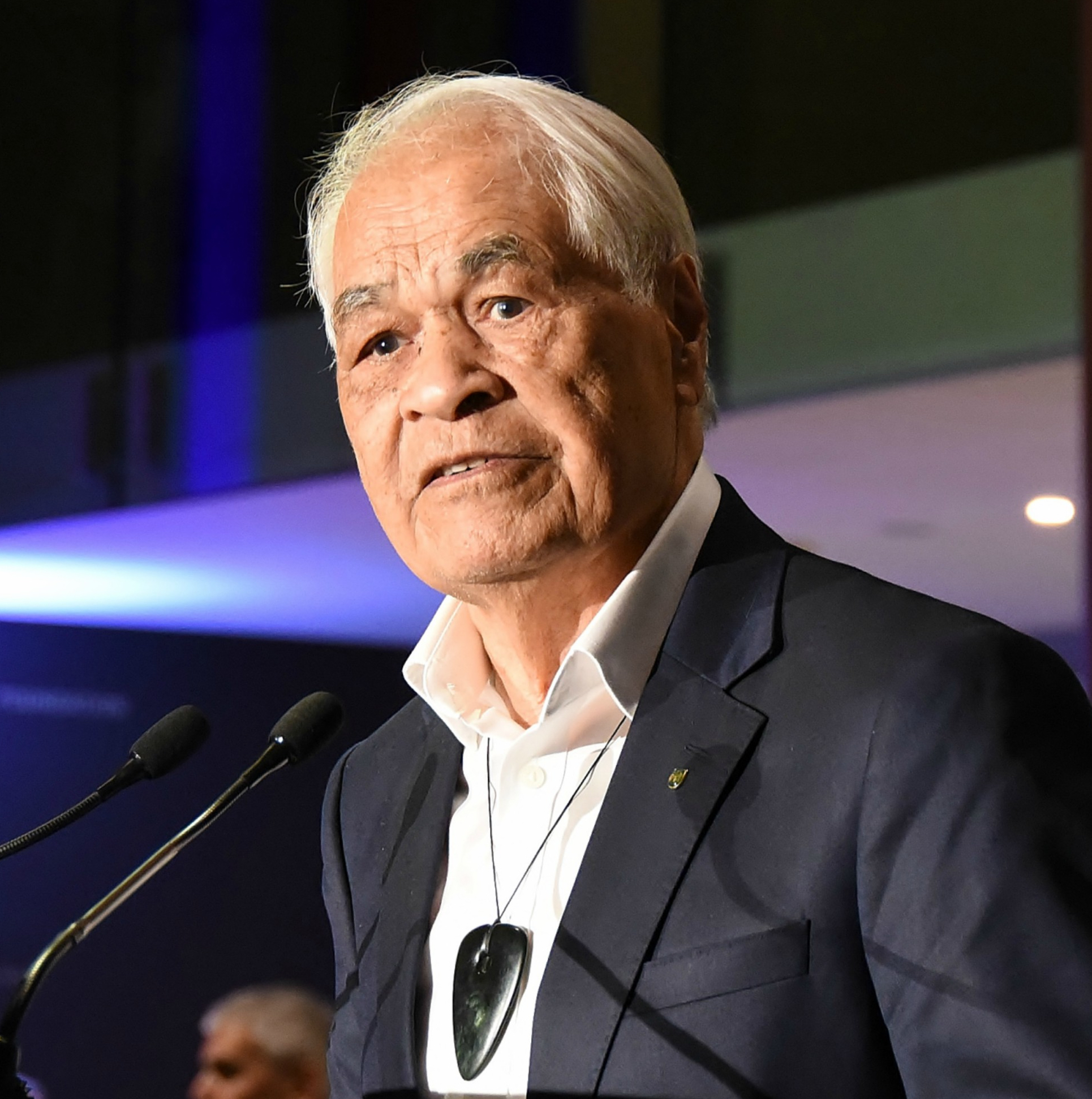
- Williams in 2017
- Born: Mahanga Te Wehinga Williams; 1936 (age 89–90)
- Relatives: Arena Williams (daughter)

Sir Haare Mahanga Te Wehinga Williams (born 1936) is a New Zealand educator, broadcaster and writer. He is described as a pioneer in Māori broadcasting, credited for his role in establishing a joint venture between Aotearoa Radio and the South Seas Film and Television School.

== Early life and education ==
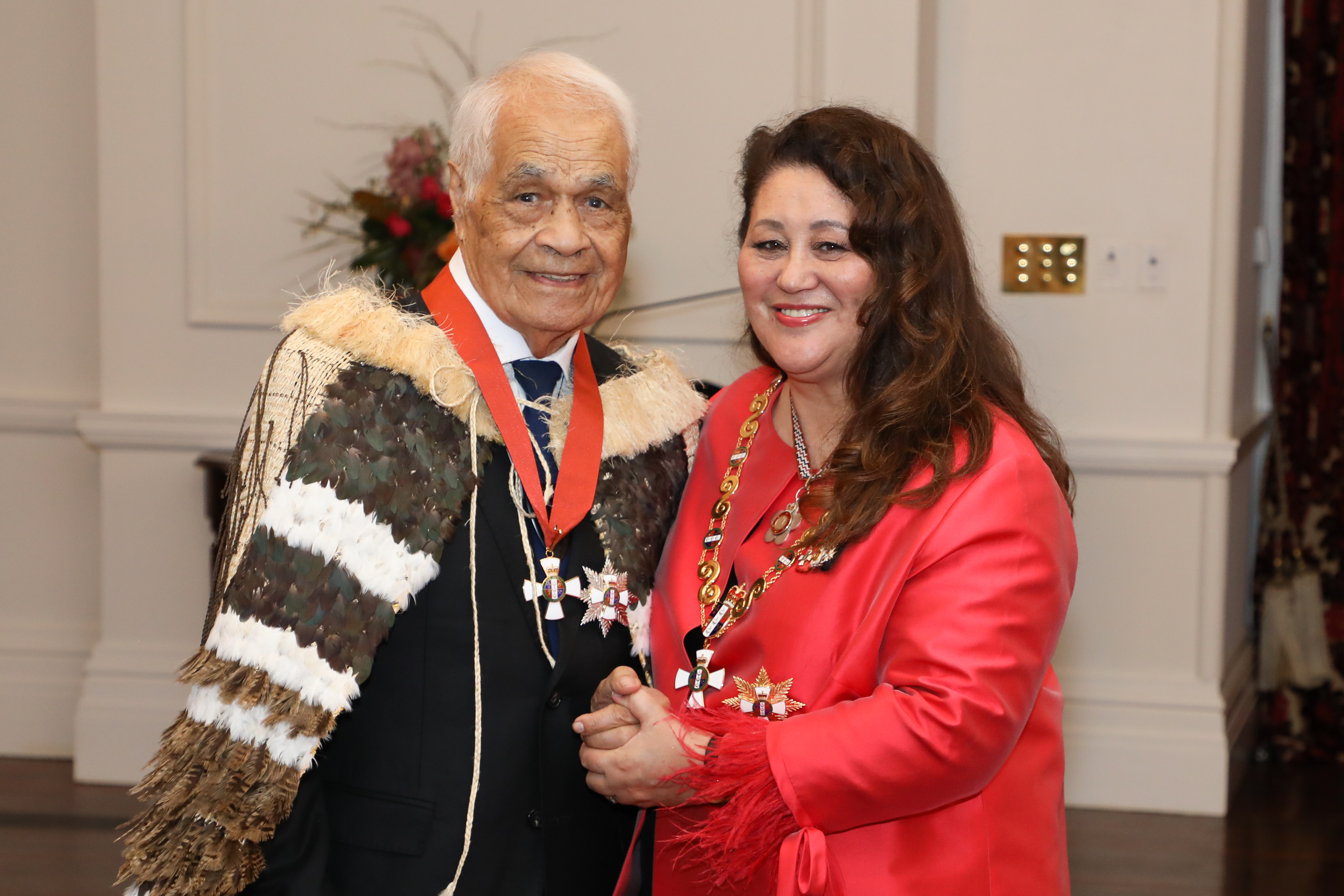
Williams (left), after his investiture as a Knight Companion of the New Zealand Order of Merit by the governor-general, Dame Cindy Kiro, at Government House, Wellington, on 30 May 2023

As a young child Williams was brought up by his grandparents at Ōhiwa Harbour, with them he was immersed in te reo Māori (the Māori language). Williams started school when he as eight and learnt English then. His grandparents had previously been at Te Urewera but were dispossessed by government actions. Williams's heritage is Māori and he descends from the nations Tuhoe, Rongowhakāta and Ngāti Porou.

His secondary school was Ōpōtiki College, and then Ardmore Teachers’ College where he graduated in 1955.

== Career ==
After completed his teaching certificate Williams taught in Tauranga, Taupō and Mātauri Bay.

Ngā Puna Waihanga, the Māori Artists and Writers Association was co-founded by Williams and other in 1973 in Te Kaha. Williams was the inaugural president of the organisation and stayed in the role for nine years.

In 1978, Radio New Zealand’s established a Māori station, Te Reo o Aotearoa, and Williams was the inaugural general manager. At Aotearoa Radio he held the role general manager.

At Unitec in Auckland Williams was the dean of Māori education and Māori advisor to the chief executive. He was awarded an honorary doctorate from Unitec in 2017. Williams oversaw the beginning of the South Seas Film and Television School with the goal 'to train te reo Māori speakers as producers and operators in film and television'.

At the 150th anniversary of the Treaty of Waitangi in 1990, Williams was involved in waka (Māori boats) construction and assembly. That year, he was awarded the New Zealand 1990 Commemoration Medal.

In 1992 he stood for the Labour Party nomination for the seat of Western Hutt ahead of the 1993 election, but lost out to regional councillor and former All Black Ken Gray. He has been the cultural advisor for Auckland City Council.

Williams is a published author, writing poetry, books and for film and television. He has also exhibited paintings. Williams is part of Kotahi Rau Pukapuka, 'which aims to produce 100 great books in te reo Māori'. His book, Words of a Kaumātua, was published in 2019. It won an award in 2020 in the te reo Māori category at the Society of Authors’ Heritage Book Awards.

In the 2018 New Year Honours, Williams was appointed a Member of the New Zealand Order of Merit, for services to Māori, the arts and education. He was promoted to Knight Companion of the New Zealand Order of Merit, for services to Māori, literature and education, in the 2023 New Year Honours.
