= Minister for Ethnic Communities =

New Zealand political office

- Coat of arms of New Zealand

- Flag of New Zealand

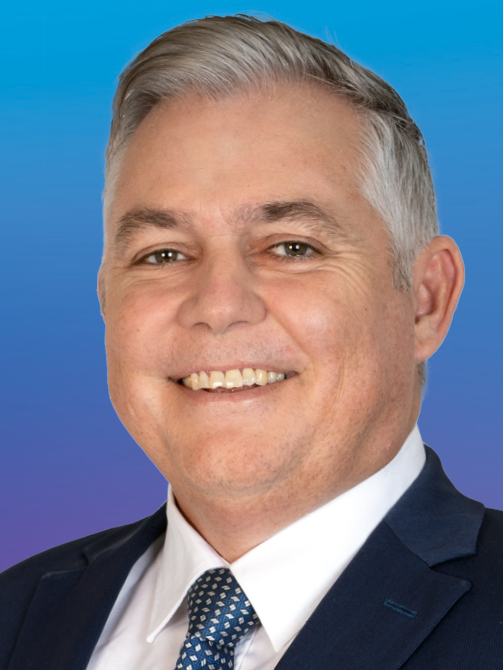
- Incumbent; Mark Mitchell since 24 January 2025
- Style: The Honourable
- Member of: Cabinet of New Zealand; Executive Council
- Reports to: Prime Minister of New Zealand
- Appointer: Governor-General of New Zealand
- Term length: At His Majesty's pleasure
- Formation: 1999
- First holder: George Hawkins (as Minister of Ethnic Affairs)

The Minister for Ethnic Communities is a minister in the New Zealand Government with broad responsibilities for ethnic inclusion.

The current Minister for Ethnic Communities Mark Mitchell.

== Responsibilities and powers ==
The minister is broadly responsible for supporting ethnic and culturally diverse communities in New Zealand. They are the responsible minister for the Ministry for Ethnic Communities and also oversee the Chinese Poll Tax Heritage Trust.

== History ==
The first appointment to the Minister of Ethnic Affairs was made in 1999 at the formation of the Fifth Labour Government. Through the 1999 election campaign, both Labour and United had pledged to appoint an ethnic affairs minister to "be involved at all levels of decision-making on issues affecting ethnic communities." The inaugural appointment was George Hawkins.

The position was renamed to Minister for Ethnic Communities in 2015. The title was briefly Minister for Diversity, Inclusion and Ethnic Communities between 2020 and 2023.

== List of ministers for ethnic communities ==
The following ministers have held the office of Minister for Ethnic Communities.

Key

National Labour

No.	Name	Portrait	Term of office		Prime Minister
As Minister of Ethnic Affairs
1	George Hawkins		10 December 1999	15 August 2002	Clark
2	Chris Carter		15 August 2002	19 November 2008	Clark
3	Pansy Wong		19 November 2008	12 November 2010	Key
-	Georgina te Heuheu Acting		12 November 2010	1 February 2011	Key
4	Hekia Parata		1 February 2011	14 December 2011	Key
5	Judith Collins		14 December 2011	30 August 2014	Key
-	Hekia Parata Acting		30 August 2014	8 October 2014	Key
6	Sam Lotu-Iiga		8 October 2014	1 March 2015	Key
As Minister for Ethnic Communities
(6)	Sam Lotu-Iiga		1 March 2015	20 December 2016	Key
(5)	Judith Collins		20 December 2016	26 October 2017	English
7	Jenny Salesa		26 October 2017	6 November 2020	Ardern
As Minister for Diversity, Inclusion and Ethnic Communities
8	Priyanca Radhakrishnan		6 November 2020	27 November 2023	Ardern
8	Priyanca Radhakrishnan		6 November 2020	27 November 2023	Hipkins
As Minister for Ethnic Communities
9	Melissa Lee		27 November 2023	24 January 2025	Luxon
10	Mark Mitchell		24 January 2025	Incumbent	Luxon
