= Andrew Linton =

New Zealand cheesemaker, farmer, and dairy board administrator

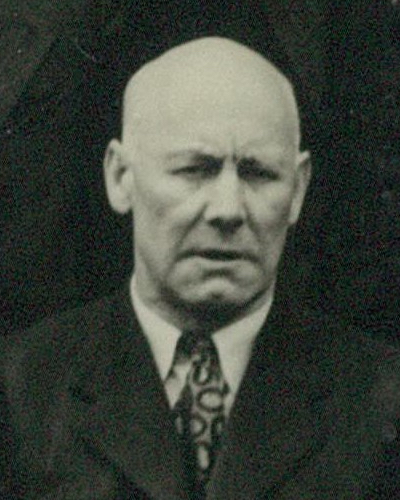
Linton in 1948

Sir Andrew Linton KBE (28 November 1893 – 9 January 1971) was a New Zealand cheesemaker, farmer and New Zealand Dairy Board administrator. He was born in Mataura, New Zealand, on 28 November 1893.

In the 1953 Coronation Honours, Linton was appointed a Commander of the Order of the British Empire. He was promoted to Knight Commander of the Order of the British Empire in the 1964 New Year Honours.

== See also ==
- List of cheesemakers
