= Louisa Wall =

New Zealand Member of Parliament

Her Excellency Louisa Wall
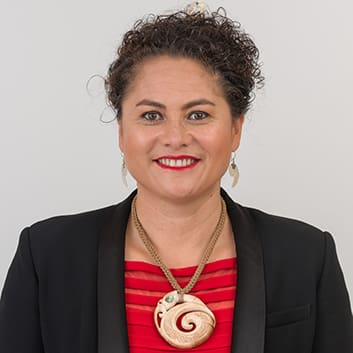
- Wall in 2020

Member of the New Zealand Parliament for Labour party list
- In office 17 October 2020 – 1 May 2022
- Succeeded by: Lemauga Lydia Sosene (Note: Normally, list MPs do not have individual predecessors or successors, but Wall succeeded Hartley and then Hughes following their resignations during sitting parliaments. She then herself resigned during the course of a parliament and was replaced by Sosene.)
- In office 6 April 2011 – 26 November 2011
- Preceded by: Darren Hughes
- In office 29 February 2008 – 8 November 2008
- Preceded by: Ann Hartley

Member of the New Zealand Parliament for Manurewa
- In office 26 November 2011 – 17 October 2020
- Preceded by: George Hawkins
- Succeeded by: Arena Williams
- Majority: 8,374

Personal details
- Born: 17 February 1972 (age 54) Taupō, New Zealand
- Party: Labour

Rugby union career
International career
Years	Team	Apps	(Points)
1995–2001	New Zealand	16	
Medal record
Representing New Zealand
Women's rugby union
Rugby World Cup
Gold medal – first place	1998 Netherlands	Team competition
- Netball career
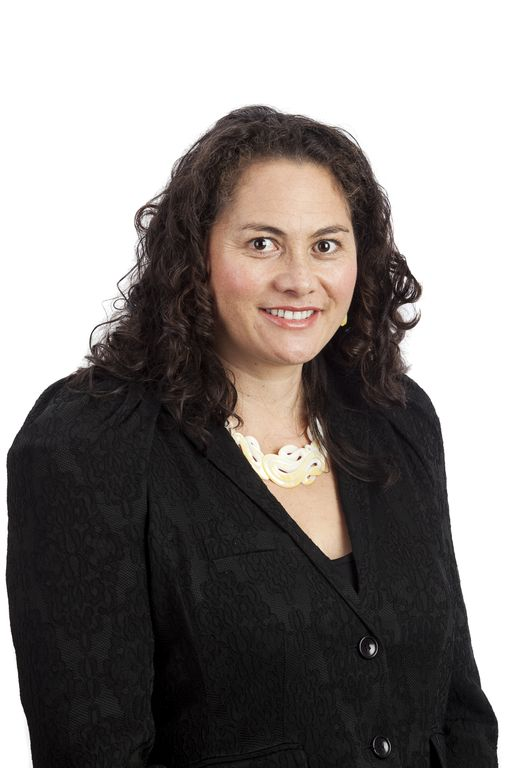
- Official photograph as member of the parliament
Years	National team	Caps
1989–1992	New Zealand	28
Medal record
Representing New Zealand
Netball World Championships
Silver medal – second place	1991 Sydney	Tournament

Louisa Hareruia Wall (born 17 February 1972) is a New Zealand former double international sportswoman, former politician, and human rights advocate. She represented New Zealand in both netball as a Silver Fern from 1989 to 1992 and in rugby union as a member of the Black Ferns from 1995 to 2001, including as a member of the 1991 World Netball Championships runner-up team and 1998 Women's Rugby World Cup winning team.

Wall had a political career with the New Zealand Labour Party between 2002 and 2022. She was a Labour list Member of Parliament (MP) and MP for Manurewa in 2008 and again from 2011 to 2022. Wall was well known for her successful attempt leading the legalisation of same-sex marriage in New Zealand in 2013. She resigned from Parliament to serve as New Zealand's ambassador for Pacific gender equality, a role she held until early 2024.

== Early life and family ==
Louisa Wall was born in Taupō to Leslie and Josephine Wall. She has Ngāti Tūwharetoa, Ngāti Hineuru and Waikato ancestry and was named after her father's cousin Louis, who died on the day she was born. She has two younger brothers and one younger sister.

She attended secondary school at Taupo-nui-a-Tia College. While only 17 years old, Wall was named in the Silver Ferns 1989 team. She earned qualifications in sport and recreation from the Waikato Institute of Technology and the University of Waikato. Later, she studied at Massey University, gaining a bachelor's degree in social work and master's degree in social policy. Her master's thesis, on the contributions Māori women had made in Parliament, was supervised by public policy professor and former National MP Marilyn Waring. Wall had a career in health research, working for the Health Research Council, the Children's Commissioner, the Ministry of Women's Affairs, and the Counties Manukau district health board. In 2004, she studied health issues on a Rotary International scholarship to Louisiana and Washington, D.C.

Wall is openly lesbian and is a strong advocate for human rights. She married her civil union partner, lawyer Prue Kapura, in December 2015, after Wall successfully led an effort to legalise same-sex marriage in New Zealand. They met through the Māori Women's Welfare League. In 2008, on the cusp of entering Parliament, she described her "primary identity" as being Māori and being gay as "one of the dimensions that makes me who I am." She was not raised speaking te reo Māori; although her father was the chairman of the local marae, he did not encourage her to learn Māori.

== Sporting career ==
From childhood, Wall was involved in many sport, including rugby union, football, karate, basketball, and netball. She played club rugby as a five-year-old but was banned at the end of the season after organiser Owen Delaney realised she was a girl.

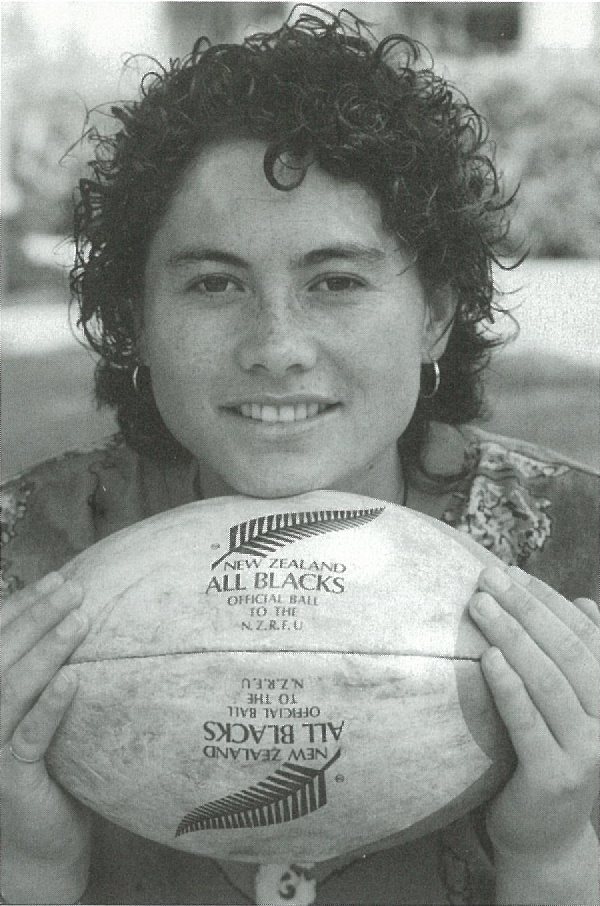
Wall in 1999

She was named in the New Zealand national netball team, the Silver Ferns, in 1989 when she was aged 17. She had aspired to be a member of the team since she was 13 or 14. She primarily played in the wing defence position and remained a member of the team through 1992, being capped 28 times. During her career, the Silver Ferns won the 1989 World Games, lost to Australia in the 1990 Commonwealth Games and were runners-up to Australia in the 1991 World Netball Championships. After leaving the Silver Ferns, Wall continued to play netball, including for the Auckland Diamonds, and was named in the 1997 Keas team of former New Zealand internationals who played annual games against the Silver Ferns. She tried to rejoin the Silver Ferns in 1999, ahead of the 1999 World Netball Championships, but was not selected.

Wall also made the New Zealand women's national rugby union team, the Black Ferns, in 1995, as a wing. This team would go on to win the first ever fully-sanctioned Women's Rugby World Cup in 1998. The team won their first game against Germany 134–6, and the final against the USA 44–12. Wall never reportedly never lost a game while playing with the Black Ferns. In 1997, Wall won the title of New Zealand Women's Rugby Player of the Year. She retired in 2002, aged 30, after suffering several knee injuries.

On 30 November 2019, Wall was inducted into the Maori Sports Hall of Fame.

== Early political career ==
New Zealand Parliament
Years	Term	Electorate	List	Party
2008	48th	List	46	Labour
2011	49th	List	43	Labour
2011–2014	50th	Manurewa	none	Labour
2014–2017	51st	Manurewa	12	Labour
2017–2020	52nd	Manurewa	26	Labour
2020–2022	53rd	List	27	Labour

After her retirement from rugby in 2002, Wall turned to politics. While apparently considered as a possible candidate for the Bay of Plenty electorate, and herself considering the possibility of succeeding Mark Burton in Taupō, Wall was a list-only candidate for the Labour Party in the 2002 general election. Ranked 49 on the party list, she was unsuccessful in her attempt to be elected.

In the 2005 election, Wall stood unsuccessfully in the Port Waikato electorate. Occupying the 46th position on the Labour party list, she was finally elected to Parliament on 29 February 2008 as a replacement for retiring Labour list MP Ann Hartley. In her maiden statement, given on 4 March, Wall addressed New Zealand foreign policy, criticising the war in Iraq and acknowledging New Zealand's role in the Pacific. She also spoke about human rights, and said: "Politics for me is about being in a position of power to make informed and principled decisions of benefit to society that protect the rights of society’s most vulnerable members." In her first year, she sat on the justice committee and the health committee.

Wall was unsuccessful in being elected in a third general election in 2008. Standing in Tāmaki Makaurau, she lost to the incumbent, Māori Party co-leader Pita Sharples, and was not returned as a Labour list MP. However, she returned to Parliament as a Labour List MP in 2011 after Darren Hughes resigned and higher-ranked former MPs declined to take the position. Wall had already been selected in December 2010 to contest Manurewa for Labour due to the retirement of George Hawkins. Sitting as a list MP for the five months until the 2011 general election, she sat on the law and order and regulations review committees.

== Member of Parliament for Manurewa ==
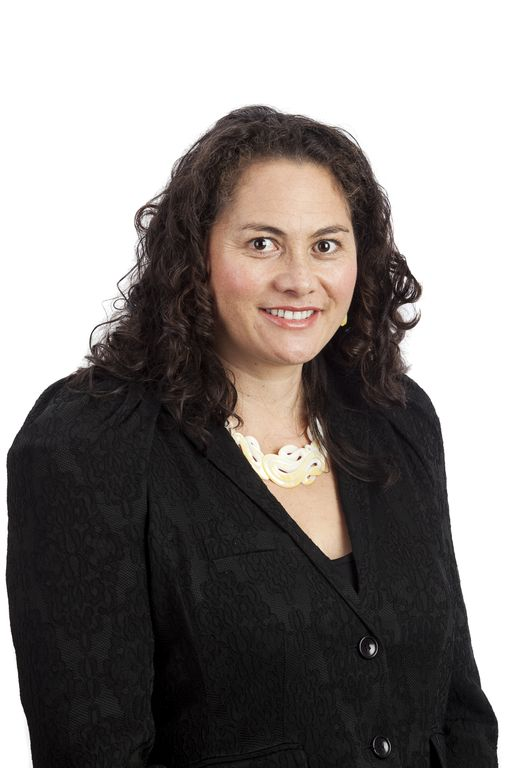
Louisa Wall in 2011

After being selected to succeed George Hawkins as the Labour candidate in Manurewa in December 2010, Wall won the electorate at the 2011 general election with an 8,610-vote majority. She was the first Māori candidate to win a general electorate for the Labour Party.

She held the electorate for Labour by similar margins in the 2014 and 2017 general elections. Politically aligned within the Labour caucus with Parekura Horomia, Lianne Dalziel, Charles Chauvel and Nanaia Mahuta, she supported David Cunliffe in the 2011 and 2013 Labour Party leadership elections. At her retirement in 2022, she stated that her historic support for Cunliffe had hampered her career progression.

In opposition from 2011 until 2017, Wall was Labour's spokesperson for sports and recreation (2011–2013), youth affairs (2013–2017), the community and voluntary sector (2013–2014), and courts (2015–2017) and sat on the Māori affairs, health, and social services committees. As a backbench MP, she became known for her ability to progress member's bills, with eight member's bills or private bills introduced during her career, including the Marriage (Definition of Marriage) Amendment Act 2013 (see § Advocacy and legislation). She was regarded by Stuff chief political reporter Henry Cooke as having achieved more than any other Labour MP between 2008 and 2017.

She was not appointed to a ministerial position in Jacinda Ardern's Sixth Labour Government and instead chaired the health committee from 2017 to 2020 and sat on the foreign affairs, defence and trade committee from 2017 to 2022. As health chair, Wall voted against an inquiry into New Zealand drug-buying agency Pharmac in 2019. She was an outspoken, independent critic of China, whom she accused of harvesting organs from the minority Uyghur and Falun Gong populations. Claire Trevett of The New Zealand Herald wrote that the reason Wall could be so outspoken "was possibly because she knew she had no chance of getting into Cabinet, so had nothing to lose."

=== 2020 re-selection dispute ===
Wall was nominated by the Manurewa Local Electorate Committee for reselection as the Labour candidate for Manurewa at the 2020 general election. Arena Williams and Ian Dunwoodie challenged Wall for the party selection. Dunwoodie had previously run for selection in 2010, but lost to Wall. Williams, a new candidate who had been mentored by Grant Robertson, submitted her nomination after the advertised deadline.

The selection was scheduled to be held on 21 March 2020, but was delayed due to the late nomination of Williams and challenge by Dunwoodie of local electorate committee representation on the selection panel. On 9 May 2020, the New Zealand Council of the Labour Party accepted Williams' nomination and supported Dunwoodie's request to remove the local electorate committee representation from the panel. Wall sought legal advice which she shared with the NZ Council and suggested internal resolution. However the Labour council rescheduled the selection for 30 May and following discussions with the Party over the legal issues, Wall withdrew her nomination as a candidate for Manurewa and announced she would run as a list-only candidate. The New Zealand Herald reported that Dunwoodie had secured enough support in the electorate to beat Wall for the nomination and that Williams, who was successful in gaining the nomination and winning the electorate in the general election, was brought in by the Labour council to block him.

During the 2020 general election, Wall was initially ranked 29 (later revised to 27) on the Labour Party list and elected for a third time as a list MP. She served in that capacity until 1 May 2022 (see § Resignation from Parliament and later career). In her 2022 valedictory statement, she said part of the agreement brokered ahead of the 2020 Manurewa selection was that she would resign from Parliament during the term.

== Advocacy and legislation ==
As a backbench MP, Wall became known for her ability to progress member's bills, with eight member's bills or private bills introduced between 2011 and 2022. In New Zealand, member's bills are selected for consideration through a lottery of up to 90 bills after being approved by member's parties. Incomplete legislative work, at the time of Wall's retirement from Parliament, included a bill to better protect journalists' sources (transferred to Ingrid Leary) and to improve surrogacy laws (transferred to Tāmati Coffey and later adopted as government legislation).

=== Same-sex marriage legislation ===
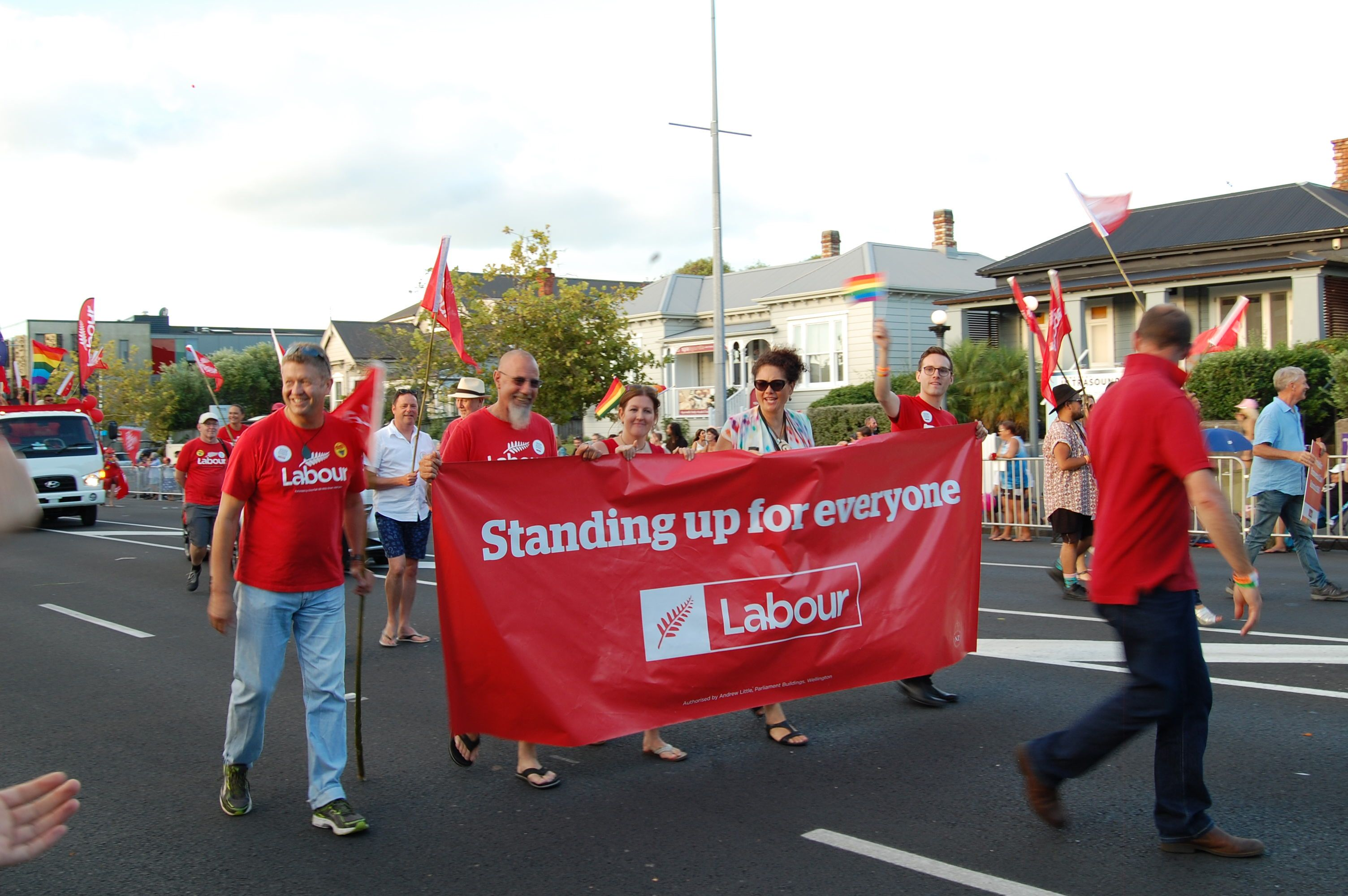
Wall and other Labour MP marching in the Auckland pride parade, 2016

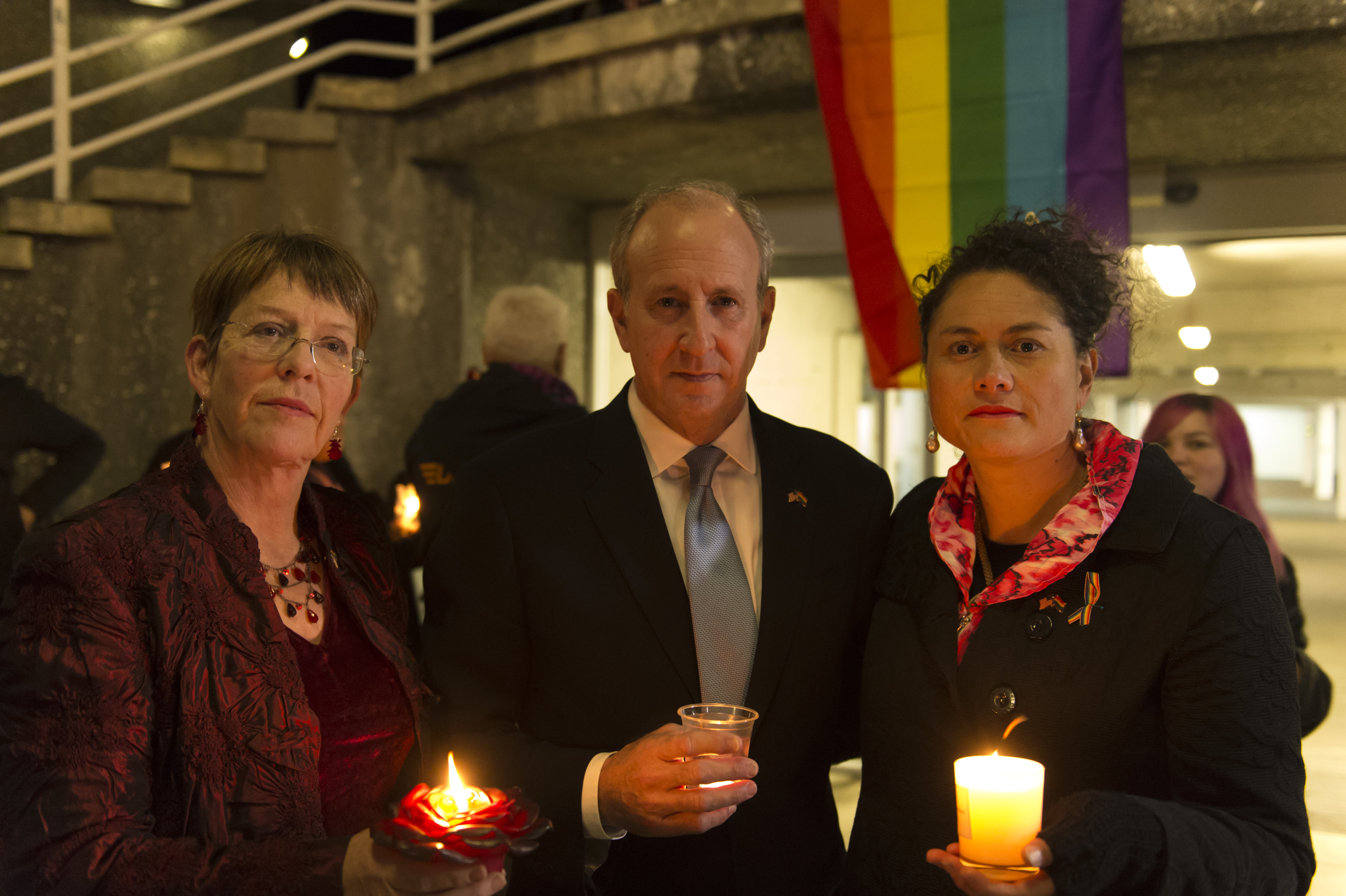
Wall attending a vigil in support of the victims of the Orlando nightclub shooting, Wellington, 2016

In May 2012, Wall submitted a member's bill to legalise same-sex marriage in New Zealand to the ballot. Wall's bill, the Marriage (Definition of Marriage) Amendment Bill was drawn on its second attempt and introduced to Parliament in late July 2012. It passed its first reading first reading with a vote of 80–40 on 29 August 2012. In later years, Wall revealed the initial draft of the bill had been prepared by her then-civil union partner and later wife.

Over the subsequent year, marriage equality legislation was a significant topic of debate in New Zealand. Wall rebuffed the Labour leadership's attempt to manage the legislation and worked with a cross-party group of MPs to lead efforts to pass the legislation. On 17 April 2013, the Bill was passed into law by 77 votes to 44, making New Zealand the 13th nation to allow same-sex marriage. The Bill came into effect on 19 August 2013; since then, married same-sex couples in New Zealand have been able to adopt children jointly.

At the third reading, Wall gave a speech likening the passing of the Bill to Treaty of Waitangi settlement acts previously passed by the New Zealand Parliament. She stated the passing of the Bill was like winning a "World Cup final".

=== Abortion safe zones legislation ===
Following a voting mix-up which saw the elimination of the safe area provisions of the Abortion Legislation Act 2020, Wall submitted a private member's bill called the Contraception, Sterilisation, and Abortion (Safe Areas) Amendment Bill, proposing their restoration. The bill was drawn from the ballot on 23 July 2020 prior to the 2020 New Zealand general election in October 2020. The bill passed its first reading on 10 March 2021 and was subsequently referred to the select committee stage. During the first reading, Walls argued that safe zones were not a free speech issue but was about protecting women's rights to access abortion services. The Bill passed its third reading on 16 March 2022 by a margin of 108 to 12 votes.

=== Revenge porn legislation ===
In 2020, Wall's member's bill on revenge porn was selected from the ballot. The Harmful Digital Communications (Unauthorised Posting of Intimate Visual Recording) Amendment Bill proposed reforms by removing the requirement that the victim of revenge porn provide proof there was intent to cause harm and instead puts the burden of proof of consent on the person who shares the recording. The bill passed its third reading unanimously on 2 March 2022.

=== Controversial Al Nisbet cartoons ===
In 2013, Wall lodged a complaint with the Human Rights Commission over two cartoons by Al Nisbet published by the Fairfax New Zealand relating to the extension of the Government's "Breakfast in Schools" programme. It was Wall's view that the cartoons, published in the Marlborough Express and The Press were "insulting and ignorant put-downs of Māori and Pacific people." After the Human Rights Commission took no action, Wall referred the matter to the Human Rights Review Tribunal which found the cartoons were insulting but did not amount to a breach of section 61 of the Human Rights Act 1993. In November 2017, Wall appealed the decision at the High Court. In February 2018, the High Court dismissed Wall's appeal against Fairfax Media. While the High Court did not overturn the Tribunal's decision it found the cartoons were objectively offensive and observed there should be a cause for reflection by Fairfax and their editorial teams. The Court found Wall had raised important issues of public interest and no costs award was made.

=== Euthanasia and assisted suicide ===
Wall submitted legislation enabling assisted suicide in 2016, inspired by the terminal illness of Lecretia Seales. The bill proposed an ethics committee, similar to the Advisory Committee on Assisted Reproductive Technology, to consider applications for assisted suicide. While the bill was not drawn, ACT New Zealand leader David Seymour's End of Life Choice Bill was drawn in 2017. Wall voted in support of the bill at each stage, but did not support the bill's passage being subject to a referendum (although the bill did succeed on this front in 2020). With National MP Lawrence Yule, she proposed amendments to the bill to widen the definition of terminal illness to be "a progressive condition that is reasonably expected to cause the death of a person within 12 months", rather than six months, but this was unsuccessful.

=== Transgender rights ===
In late June 2021, Wall expressed support for transgender athlete Laurel Hubbard, stating that she has every right to be at the 2020 Summer Olympics and hope that she would do New Zealand well. Wall rejected suggestions that Hubbard transitioned to give her an advantage, emphasising that Hubbard had given up weightlifting for many years after she realised her identity did not match her biology.

=== China ===
In June 2020, Wall joined the Inter-Parliamentary Alliance on China alongside National MP Simon O'Connor. The Inter-Parliamentary Alliance on China (IPAC) is an international cross-party group of legislators working towards reform on how democratic countries approach China. In December 2020, she and O'Connor urged New Zealand to support Australia in the face of diplomatic and trade pressure from China.

In early July 2021, Wall alleged that China was harvesting organs from Falun Gong and Uyghur political prisoners. She also alleged that China was detaining 1 million Uyghur in "education camps" as slave labour for picking cotton. Wall called on the New Zealand Government to pass legislation to stop the purchase of goods produced through forced labour and to stop New Zealanders getting organ transplants sourced from China or from any country that cannot verify the integrity of its organ donor programme. Wall based her statements on Sir Geoffrey Nice's China Tribunal. In response, Prime Minister Ardern distanced herself from Wall, stating that the latter was not representing the New Zealand Government but as chair of the New Zealand branch of the Inter-Parliamentary Alliance.

== Resignation from Parliament and later career ==
On 29 March 2022, Wall announced that she would resign from Parliament, citing "events during the 2020 election". Foreign affairs minister Nanaia Mahuta announced on 7 April 2022 that Wall would be appointed to a newly created position in the Ministry of Foreign Affairs as Ambassador for Gender Equality (Pacific)/Tuia Tāngata. The role was intended to support gender equality and the advancement and leadership opportunities for women and LGBTQI+ people in the Pacific Islands. Ministry officials were sceptical about the use of a "roving ambassador" position and there was criticism the role was designed specifically for Wall. The role was disestablished after two years when funding was not renewed.

Wall took many media interviews between the announcement of her resignation and her valedictory speech, which was delivered on 14 April 2022. In these interviews and this speech, she stated that her departure was the result of an agreement with the Labour Party she would not serve a full term in office. She described her de-selection as Labour's Manurewa candidate (see § 2020 re-selection dispute) as unconstitutional and claimed prime minister Jacinda Ardern did not want her in Cabinet or the Labour caucus because of her past support for David Cunliffe over Ardern's ally Grant Robertson. Her resignation came into effect on 1 May 2022 and her seat in Parliament was filled by the next person on Labour's list, Lemauga Lydia Sosene.

Radio New Zealand reported in April 2023 that Wall was "understood to be thinking about running for Te Pāti Māori in Manurewa in this year's general election," although this did not ultimately eventuate.

== Notes ==
New Zealand Parliament
Preceded by George Hawkins	Member of Parliament for Manurewa; 2011–2020	Succeeded by Arena Williams
