= Nellie Schroder =

New Zealand teacher and community leader

Nellie Winifred Bernice Schroder MBE (née Radford, 17 January 1903 – 10 June 1993) was a notable New Zealand teacher and community leader. She was born in Plumstead, Kent, England, in 1903.

In 1953, Schroder was awarded the Queen Elizabeth II Coronation Medal. In the 1964 New Year Honours, she was appointed a Member of the Order of the British Empire, for services to the community, especially in connection with the Women's Division of Federated Farmers.
