= Merv Wellington =

New Zealand politician

Mervyn Langlois Wellington QSO (6 October 1940 – 7 September 2003) was a New Zealand politician of the National Party.

== Early life and family ==
Wellington was born in Inglewood in 1940, and received his education at New Plymouth Boys' High School and the University of Auckland. He married Elizabeth Helen Bean in 1961 and the couple had three daughters. After a period as a social welfare worker between 1959 and 1961, Wellington became a school teacher and taught at St Stephen's School, Pukekohe High School and Ruapehu College. He was also a Methodist lay preacher and served as a Pukekohe borough councillor.

== Member of Parliament ==
New Zealand Parliament
Years	Term	Electorate	Party
1975–1978	38th	Manurewa	National
1978–1981	39th	Papakura	National
1981–1984	40th	Papakura	National
1984–1987	41st	Papakura	National
1987–1990	42nd	Papakura	National

He represented the Manurewa electorate from 1975 to 1978, and then the Papakura electorate from 1978 to 1990, when he retired.

Wellington served as a Cabinet minister, being the Minister of Education from 13 December 1978 to 26 July 1984. During his tenure as Education Minister, he regularly courted controversy with teacher unions on various issues. Wellington was a Muldoon loyalist, and was demoted after National's 1984 election defeat.

== Honours and awards ==
In 1977, Wellington was awarded the Queen Elizabeth II Silver Jubilee Medal, and in 1990 he received the New Zealand 1990 Commemoration Medal. In the 1993 Queen's Birthday Honours, he was appointed a Companion of the Queen's Service Order for public services.

== Death ==
Wellington died in 2003, following a long illness.

New Zealand Parliament
Preceded by Phil Amos	Member of Parliament for Manurewa; 1975–1978	Succeeded by Roger Douglas
New constituency	Member of Parliament for Papakura; 1978–1990	Succeeded by John Robertson
Political offices
Preceded by Les Gandar	Minister of Education; 1978–1984	Succeeded by Russell Marshall
