= Ivon Wilson =

Ivon Vernon Wilson OBE (1885–1974) was a notable New Zealand dentist and regional promoter. He was born in Dunedin, New Zealand, in 1885.

In 1953, Wilson was awarded the Queen Elizabeth II Coronation Medal. In the 1964 New Year Honours, he was appointed an Officer of the Order of the British Empire, for services to the community.
