= Al Nisbet =

New Zealand cartoonist

Alastair Nisbet (born 1958) is a Scottish-born New Zealand cartoonist.

== Career ==
Nisbet's cartoons were published in the Christchurch Press from 1980–2017. He has worked for a number of other newspapers including the Sunday Times, New Zealand Times, Stuff, and the Independent. He has twice been named the New Zealand cartoonist of the year.

== Criticism ==
Nisbet's cartoons have "often attracted complaints for their racist, sexist, and classist nature". In 2013 two of his cartoons were taken to the Press Council for promoting "racial disharmony". A complaint about the cartoons was also lodged with the Human Rights Commission in 2014 by Member of Parliament Louisa Wall, but the complaint was dismissed.
