= Christabel Robinson =

New Zealand teacher, vocational guidance and community worker

Christabel Robinson MBE
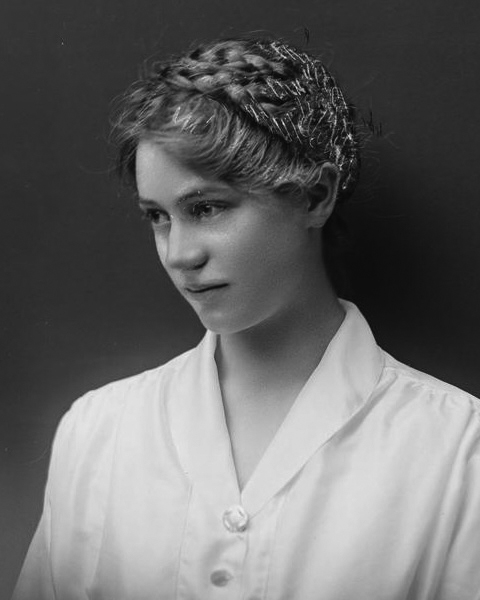
- Robinson, c. 1920
- Born: 28 March 1898; Lower Riccarton, New Zealand
- Died: 3 June 1988 (aged 90); Christchurch, New Zealand

Christabel Elizabeth Robinson MBE (28 March 1898 – 3 June 1988) was a New Zealand teacher, vocational guidance and community worker. She was born in Lower Riccarton, Christchurch, New Zealand, in 1898.

With a colleague, G. E. Maxwell Keys, Robinson was responsible in 1936 for the establishment of vocational guidance nationally as part of the Ministry of Education rather than the Ministry of Labour, significantly changing its role.

Robinson was instrumental for many years in the New Zealand Crippled Children Society and particularly sheltered workshops for the disabled. In the 1964 New Year Honours, Robinson was appointed a Member of the Order of the British Empire, for services to the community, especially as secretary of the Canterbury Sheltered Workshop Association.
