= Arena Williams =

New Zealand politician

Arena Williams MP
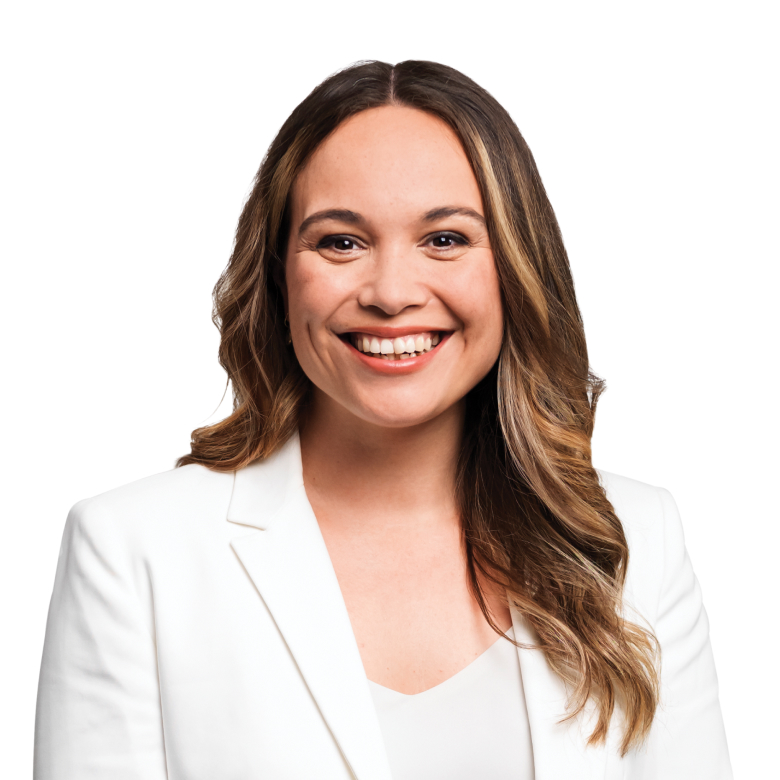
- Williams in 2023

Member of the New Zealand Parliament for Manurewa
- Incumbent
- Assumed office 17 October 2020
- Preceded by: Louisa Wall

Personal details
- Born: 1990 (age 35–36)
- Party: Labour
- Spouse: Max Hardy
- Relations: Haare Williams (father)
- Children: 2
- Education: University of Auckland
- Profession: Lawyer
- Website: www.arenawilliams.co.nz

Arena Hinekura Sherburd Williams (born 1990) is a New Zealand Labour Party politician. She has been a Member of Parliament in the House of Representatives for the Manurewa electorate since 2020.

== Early life, career and family ==
Williams is affiliated with the Māori iwi of Te Aitanga-a-Māhaki, Ngāi Tūhoe and Ngāi Tahu. Her parents are doctor Jacqueline Allan (Ngāi Tahu) and educator, broadcaster, and former Papakura city councillor Sir Haare Williams (Ngāi Tūhoe and Te Aitanga-a-Māhaki). She grew up in Papakura and spoke Māori as a child. Williams attended Diocesan School for Girls in Auckland.

Williams studied law and commerce at the University of Auckland, and was active within the Princes Street Labour. In 2012 she was president of the Auckland University Students' Association. In 2012 she and other university students staged a campus protest to highlight the issue of rising student debt. The under-dressed students begged people passing on the street for clothing, graphically depicting how students have to "borrow to live".

Williams began her career working as a probation officer in Panmure, encountering many people in the court system for relatively minor offences, prompting her advocacy for justice reform. She also worked for law firm Chapman Tripp.

== Political career ==
New Zealand Parliament
Years	Term	Electorate	List	Party
2020–2023	53rd	Manurewa	58	Labour
2023–2026	54th	Manurewa	48	Labour
2026–present	55th	Manurewa	40	Labour

=== Early political career ===
Williams stood for the Hunua electorate in the New Zealand House of Representatives in 2014 election for the Labour Party where she placed second, losing to Andrew Bayly by the large margin of 17,376 votes. Aged 24 she was Labour's youngest candidate at that election.

In November 2019 Williams was appointed as a member of the Waitematā District Health Board.

Williams as well as Ian Dunwoodie both nominated to challenge Louisa Wall for the Labour Party selection for the seat of Manurewa, one of the safest red seats in the country. The selection was scheduled to be held on 21 March 2020, but was delayed due to a complaint about whether some new party electorate branch members lived in Manurewa and were eligible to vote in the selection process. In May, Wall's partner and lawyer Prue Kapua contacted the national party council, claiming that Williams's application was late, and warned that legal action would be taken if it was not rejected. The selection was rescheduled to 30 May, but Wall withdrew her application on 29 May, to instead run as a list-only candidate. Williams was selected as the Labour candidate.

=== First term, 2020–2023 ===
During the 2020 general election held on 17 October, she beat National candidate Nuwi Samarakone by a margin of 17,179 votes. In her first term, Williams served as a member of the justice committee, Māori affairs committee (including as deputy chairperson and chairperson) and the Pae Ora legislation committee.

=== Second term, 2023–2026 ===
She was re-elected in Manurewa at the 2023 general election, with a majority of 7,113 over National Party candidate Siva Kilari. In late November 2023, Williams was appointed as Assistant Whip, and spokesperson for commerce and consumer affairs, building and construction, and state-owned enterprises in the Shadow Cabinet of Chris Hipkins. In a reshuffle in early March 2025, Williams gained the youth portfolio, retained the commerce and consumer affairs and building and construction portfolios, and lost the state-owned enterprises portfolio.

In late April 2026, Williams's private member's bill requiring banks and money transfer services to disclose international money transfer fees to customers passed its first reading with the support of all parties except the National Party.

In September, during the 2026 election campaign, Williams announced Labour's plans for supermarket competition.

=== Third term, 2026–present ===
During the 2026 New Zealand general election, Williams contested the Manurewa for Labour. She was ranked 40th on the Labour Party list. Based on preliminary votes, Williams retained Manurewa by a margin of 10,973 votes, based on marginal results.

== Personal life ==
Williams is married to ex-lawyer Max Hardy. They have two children. She enjoys painting.

=== Kāinga Ora advertisement ===
In November 2021, the New Zealand social housing agency Kāinga Ora drew controversy after Newshub and Radio New Zealand reported that the agency had used Williams (a Labour Party candidate) in a taxpayer-funded advertisement in 2020, compromising its political neutrality. Kāinga Ora drew criticism from Housing Minister Megan Woods and deputy Opposition Leader Nicola Willis on the grounds of professionalism and compromising its political neutrality. Woods subsequently reported the agency to the Public Service Commission. The National Party called for an investigation into Kāinga Ora, alleging a cover up and "culture of deceit." Williams had informed Kāinga Ora of her political ambitions prior to the advertorial featuring her was paid for and published.

New Zealand Parliament
Preceded by Louisa Wall	Member of Parliament for Manurewa; 2020–present	Incumbent
