= Melissa Lee =

New Zealand politician (born 1966)

The Honourable Melissa Lee MP
- 이지연
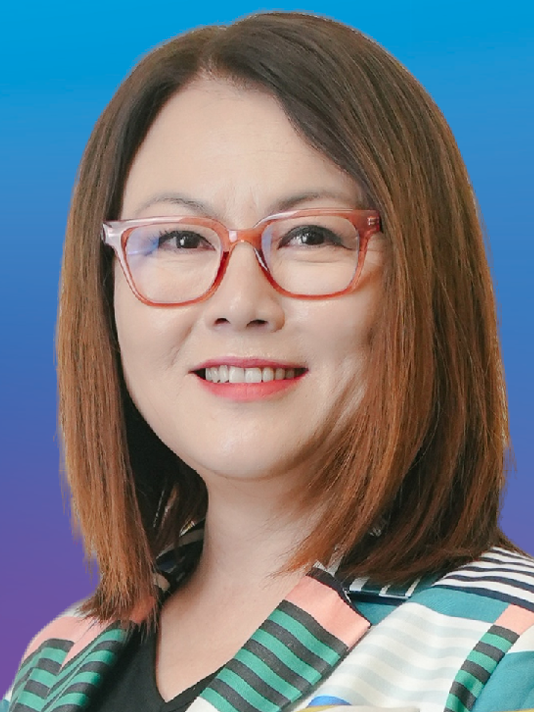
- Lee in 2023

11th Minister for Economic Development
- In office 27 November 2023 – 24 January 2025
- Prime Minister: Christopher Luxon
- Preceded by: Barbara Edmonds
- Succeeded by: Nicola Willis

2nd Minister for Ethnic Communities
- In office 27 November 2023 – 24 January 2025
- Prime Minister: Christopher Luxon
- Preceded by: Priyanca Radhakrishnan
- Succeeded by: Mark Mitchell

28th Minister for Media and Communications
- In office 27 November 2023 – 24 April 2024
- Prime Minister: Christopher Luxon
- Preceded by: Willie Jackson
- Succeeded by: Paul Goldsmith

Member of the New Zealand Parliament for the National Party list
- In office 8 November 2008 – 7 November 2026

Personal details
- Born: Lee Ji-yeon 이지연; 1966 (age 59–60) South Korea
- Party: New Zealand National Party

Melissa Ji-Yun Lee (Korean: 이지연; born 1966) is a New Zealand politician. She was elected to the House of Representatives as a list MP for the National Party in the 2008 general election. She served as the 11th Minister for Economic Development and 2nd Minister for Ethnic Communities from November 2023 to January 2025. She also served as the 28th Minister for Media and Communications from November 2023 to April 2024. During the 2026 general election, Lee was unseated after no National list MPs were elected to Parliament via the party list.

== Early life and career ==
Lee was born in South Korea and grew up in Malaysia before moving to Australia and then to New Zealand in 1988 with her family. She has a MA Hons (First Class) in Communication Studies. Based in Auckland, she spent twenty-three years in journalism, including a five-year stint at the Sunday News and writing for numerous publications including The New Zealand Herald and The Listener. She was also the producer of the TV magazine series Asia Downunder.

== Member of Parliament ==
New Zealand Parliament
Years	Term	Electorate	List	Party
2008–2011	49th	List	37	National
2011–2014	50th	List	34	National
2014–2017	51st	List	31	National
2017–2020	52nd	List	31	National
2020–2023	53rd	List	16	National
2023–2026	54th	List	13	National

In November 2008, Lee became a List MP in the New Zealand Parliament. Her maiden speech included sections in English, Māori, and Korean. In English, she mentioned crime, education, and anti-Asian racism issues in New Zealand. In the Māori section, she mentioned the history of Māori first coming to New Zealand by canoe from Hawaiki and compared it to her own migration to New Zealand by aeroplane. Near the end of her speech, she thanked, in Korean, all the people that had given her support "simply by virtue of [their] shared heritage".

Lee became the second Korean, and first Korean woman, to win the election to a non-Korean national legislature. (The first Korean elected to a foreign national-level office, Jay Kim, became a member of the United States House of Representatives in 1992.)

A poll conducted between 10 December 2008 and 19 April 2009 by the Spanish newspaper, 20 minutos (20 minutes) ranked Lee as the world's 51st most beautiful female politician.

=== First term and Mt Albert by-election, 2008–2011 ===
During the first months of entering Parliament two Conscience votes were taken, Melissa Lee voted against the Misuse of Drugs (Medicinal Cannabis) Amendment Bill and the Liquor Advertising (Television and Radio) Bill.

On 16 April 2009, Lee announced her candidacy for the National Party nomination in the 2009 Mount Albert by-election. She defeated the previous local National candidate, Ravi Musuku, to win selection for the National Party on 4 May 2009.

On 13 May 2009, Lee told a candidates' meeting that the SH20 Waterview Connection could divert criminals from South Auckland away from the electorate. Lee apologised the next day, saying "if South Auckland people (find) my comments offensive, I apologise. It wasn't about them. It was about criminals." Prime Minister John Key later said the remark was a "stupid statement to make". Later that day she apologised again saying, "I apologise unreservedly for the comments I made regarding South Auckland... I sincerely regret my remarks." In the by-election, Lee attracted only 3,542 votes, coming a distant second to Labour's David Shearer's 13,260 votes.

During the by-election, allegations were made in May 2009 that Lee's production company Asia Vision had spent New Zealand on Air money making a promotional video for the National Party ahead of the 2008 election. Lee called the allegations "ridiculous", saying that all work on the video was done by volunteers. The Green Party referred the video to the Electoral Commission, saying that it should have been declared as an election expense. An investigation conducted by New Zealand on Air later cleared Lee of the charge of misuse of funding.

Later in 2009, Lee used NZ$100,000 of contingency funding to increase the markup for Asia Downunder in violation of her contract with New Zealand on Air, which she described as "an innocent error".

In April 2011, Lee courted controversy when, after she had made a speech supporting the controversially rushed-through copyright law 92A, it emerged that hours earlier she had tweeted "Ok. Shower... Reading ... And then bed! listening to a compilation a friend did for me of K Pop. Fab. Thanks Jay" which a journalist argued appeared to contradict their stance on law 92A.

=== Second term, 2011–2014 ===
During the 2011 general election, Melissa Lee increased her electoral vote in the Mt Albert electorate but failed to unseat David Shearer, who retained the seat by a margin of 10,021 votes.

On 20 December 2011, John Key announced that Lee and John Hayes would become Parliamentary Private Secretaries, a role not in use for several years. Key appointed her to the portfolio of Ethnic Affairs, given the heavy workload of Judith Collins as the newly appointed Minister of Justice. In January 2014, Lee was appointed Chairperson of the Social Services Select Committee.

There were several conscience votes during the 50th Parliament surrounding issues of the legal alcohol purchase age and Same-Sex Marriage. In these votes, Lee voted against the Marriage (Definition of Marriage) Amendment Act 2013 and voted in favour of retaining the Alcohol Purchase age at 18 in the Alcohol Reform Bill.

=== Third term, 2014–2017 ===
During the 2014 general election, Melissa Lee failed to win the Mt Albert electorate. Her Labour opponent David Shearer retained the seat by 10,656 votes, a moderate decrease on the previous election, while National won a substantially increased party vote, winning the party by 3,536.

After the 2014 election, Lee was appointed to chair the Commerce Select Committee while also retaining her position as Parliamentary Private Secretary for Ethnic Communities, the position being renamed to reflect the change in name of the eponymous Ministry and Minister, Lee has been joined by Jacqui Dean as a Parliamentary Private Secretary since the retirement of John Hayes at the 2014 Election. Lee also has one Private Members Bill waiting to be drawn from the ballot: the Accident Compensation (Recent Migrants and Returning New Zealanders) Amendment Bill.

In 2015, New Zealand First Ron Mark was criticised by members of all parties when he told Lee to go back to Korea in parliament.

=== Fourth term, 2017–2020 ===
During the 2017 general election in mid-September 2017, Melissa Lee was re-elected on the National Party List. Lee stood against Labour Party leader Jacinda Ardern in the Mt Albert electorate but was defeated by a margin of 15,264 votes. Following the formation of a Labour-led coalition government on 19 October 2017, the National Party became the main opposition party in Parliament. Lee was the National Party's spokesperson for broadcasting, communications, and digital media, and ethnic communities. She is also a member of the Economic Development, Science and Innovation select committee.

In March 2018, Lee challenged the Broadcasting Minister Clare Curran about her undisclosed meeting with Carol Hirschfield, the head of content at Radio New Zealand. Curran initially claimed the meeting had been coincidental but later admitted that it had been prearranged. Lee accused Curran of engaging in a cover-up.

In mid-September 2019, Lee raised the issue in Parliament about Asian children being denied measles vaccinations at their local clinic on the pretext that Māori and Pasifika children were being given priority. In response, the Waikato District Health Board acknowledged that it was prioritizing Maori and Pacific children due to their lower vaccination rate and poorer health outcomes.

During the COVID-19 pandemic in New Zealand in mid-July 2020, Lee raised the plight of Dowook Kang, a six-year-old Korean child who was unable to attend school since his father, a temporary visa holder, was unable to return to New Zealand due to lock down travel restrictions. Under New Zealand law, international students under the age of ten are unable to attend schools without the presence of a parent or guardian. Education Minister Chris Hipkins declined to intervene, citing policy issues.

=== Fifth term, 2020–2023 ===
During the 2020 New Zealand general election, Lee contested Mount Albert and came second place behind Prime Minister Jacinda Ardern, who retained the seat by a final margin of 21,246 votes. However, Lee was able to return to Parliament via the National Party list.

Lee was one of only eight MPs to vote against the Conversion Practices Prohibition Legislation Act 2022.

In November 2022, Lee introduced the Fair Trading (Gift Card Expiry) Amendment Bill which requires gift cards to have a minimum validity period of three years, aiming to mitigate approximately $10M in annual consumer losses from expired gift cards.

=== Sixth term, 2023–2026 ===
Lee contested Mount Albert in the 2023 New Zealand general election and came second place behind Helen White by just 20 votes. After Lee sought a judicial recount, White's margin dropped to 18 votes. However, she was re-elected to Parliament on the National Party list.

In late November 2023, Lee assumed the positions of Minister for Economic Development, Minister for Ethnic Communities, Minister for Media and Communications, and Associate Accident Compensation Corporation (ACC) Minister in the National-led coalition government's cabinet.

In March 2024, Lee in her capacity as Media and Communications Minister confirmed that she was working with officials to develop a plan to support the New Zealand media following reports of job and programme cuts at TVNZ, and a proposal by Warner Bros. Discovery New Zealand to scrap its Newshub news service. In April 2024, Lee expressed sympathy for TVNZ and Newshub journalists and other employees following the confirmation of hundreds of job losses in the media sector, stating it was a "terrible day" for the media industry but that it was also a global issue and that the "media needed to transition." However, she declined to elaborate on details of her plan to help the media sector and was unable to give a timeframe for when Cabinet would consider her paper. One of her ideas has included reviewing the Broadcasting Act. Lee has also expressed opposition to the previous Labour Government's Fair News Digital Governing Bill, which proposed forcing social media platforms to pay media companies for distributing their content. Labour leader Chris Hipkins criticised Lee's response to the media sector's woes, saying that she had "more than enough time" to come up with solutions.

During a cabinet reshuffle on 24 April 2024, Lee was removed from her role as Minister for Media and Communications and Cabinet position by Prime Minister Christopher Luxon due to controversy surrounding the closure of Newshub and her poor response to it. Paul Goldsmith assumed her Media and Communications portfolio while Climate Change and Revenue Minister Simon Watts assumed her place in Luxon's cabinet.

On 19 January 2025, Lee was stripped of her economic development and ethnic communities ministerial portfolios during a cabinet reshuffle, which were assumed by Nicola Willis and Mark Mitchell respectively. On 24 January 2025, she was granted retention of the title The Honourable, in recognition of her term as a member of the Executive Council.

In June 2026, The Spinoff reported that Lee had used a special taxpayer-funded superannuation scheme and a taxpayer-funded accommodation allowance (worth a combined $72,640 per annum) to buy and stay in her own Wellington apartment. According to records obtained by The Spinoff, she purchased a Wellington apartment in 2016 and claimed the maximum accommodation supplement. In addition, Lee also owned another property and had a mortgage with ANZ Bank New Zealand.

During the 2026 New Zealand general election, Lee was ranked 29th on the National Party list, dropping down from 13th place. She contested the Mt Albert electorate and placed second behind incumbent MP Helen White, who retained the seat by a margin of 4,678 votes. Lee was unseated since no National list MPs entered Parliament in 2026 via the party list.
