= Mayor of Papakura =

The Mayor of Papakura was the head of the municipal government of Papakura, New Zealand, and presided first over Papakura Borough (1938–1975), then Papakura City (1975–1989), and finally Papakura District (1989–2010). The mayor was directly elected using a First Past the Post electoral system.

== History ==
Papakura City was constituted as a city on 1 January 1975. It existed until the 1989 local government reforms, when "Papakura City" was subsumed by "Papakura District". Papakura District was abolished on 31 October 2010, when the area became part of the Auckland Region, governed by the Auckland Council.

The 2007 mayoralty (and the last one before the advent of the Super City) was contested by Calum Penrose, the incumbent John Robertson, and Brent Catchpole. They received 5386, 3985 and 757 votes, respectively. Penrose was thus elected.

== List of mayors of Papakura ==
The following persons served as mayor of Papakura:

	Name	Portrait	Term of office	Notes
Papakura Borough
1	Samuel Evans		1938–1947	
2	Ted Busing		1947–1953	
3	Ike Mack		1953–1966	
4	Archibald Campbell		1966–1975	
Papakura City
(4)	Archibald Campbell		1975–1977	
5	Jack Farrell		1977–1983	
6	George Hawkins		1983–1989	
Papakura District
(6)	George Hawkins		1989–1992	
7	David Hawkins		1992–2000	Resigned in October 2000
8	David Buist		2000–2004	Elected in byelection, 25 November 2000
9	John Robertson		2004–2007	
10	Calum Penrose		2007–2010	
