= Calum Penrose =

New Zealand politician

Calum Penrose is a New Zealand politician who was mayor of Papakura from 2007 to 2010, and an Auckland Councillor from 2010 to 2016.

== Political career ==
Auckland Council
Years	Ward	Affiliation
2010–2010	Manurewa-Papakura	Manurewa-Papakura First Action
2013–2016	Manurewa-Papakura	Independent for Manurewa-Papakura

In 2007 Penrose was elected the Mayor of Papakura, defeating incumbent John Robertson.

In the 2010 Auckland Council elections Penrose won a seat in the Manurewa-Papakura ward standing under the Manurewa-Papakura First Action ticket. He was re-elected in 2013. He stood in the 2016 election but failed to be re-elected.

Political offices
Preceded by John Robertson	Mayor of Papakura; 2007–2010	Office abolished
