= Papakura (electorate) =

Electorate in Auckland, New Zealand

- Single-member general constituency for the New Zealand House of Representatives
- Interactive map of boundaries from the 2026 election
- Formation: 1978, 2008
- Region: Auckland
- Character: Suburban
- Term: 3 years

Member for Papakura
- Vacant since 14 May 2026
- Previous MP: Judith Collins (National)
Party vote distribution

Papakura is an electorate for the New Zealand House of Representatives, based in the south Auckland town of Papakura. Historically, the name refers to an electorate that existed between 1978 and 1996, which with the advent of Mixed Member Proportional voting and resulting reduction in the number of constituencies was folded into a new Hunua seat. In 2002 Hunua was modified, pulled northwards and renamed Clevedon. The seat is currently vacant following the resignation of Judith Collins, of the National Party, on 14 May 2026.

== Population centres ==
Papakura electorate boundaries used from the 2014 election until 2020

The 1977 electoral redistribution was the most overtly political since the Representation Commission had been established through an amendment to the Representation Act in 1886, initiated by Muldoon's National Government. As part of the 1976 census, a large number of people failed to fill out an electoral re-registration card, and census staff had not been given the authority to insist on the card being completed. This had little practical effect on people on the general roll, but it transferred Māori to the general roll if the card was not handed in. Together with a northward shift of New Zealand's population, this resulted in five new electorates having to be created in the upper part of the North Island. The electoral redistribution was very disruptive, and 22 electorates were abolished, while 27 electorates were newly created (including Papakura) or re-established. These changes came into effect for the 1978 election.

Map of boundaries at the 2020 and 2023 general elections

In a modern sense, the name refers to a constituency which was fought for the first time at the 2008 election. This new Papakura seat is the successor to the old Clevedon seat. The electorate is centred on Papakura and stretches from the Manukau Harbour in the west to the Hauraki Gulf to the east. It covers the towns of Drury, Karaka, Kingseat. Until 2014 it also included Waiau Pa and Clarks Beach. The 2020 redistribution significantly altered the electorate profile with the creation of the new Takanini ceding the South Auckland suburbs of Wattle Downs, Conifer Grove, Takanini, Randwick Park, Alfriston, The Gardens and Totara Heights, while gaining the rural communities of Ararimu, Beachlands, Bombay, Brookby, Clevedon, Hunua, Kawakawa Bay, Maraetai, Ness Valley, Ōrere Point, Ramarama and Whitford. In the 2025 redistribution, the electorate would cede Beachlands, Maraetai and Whitford to Botany and gain part of Takanini from Takanini.

== History ==
In the 1978 election, the Papakura electorate was won by National's Merv Wellington, who had been MP for the Manurewa electorate since 1975. When he retired at the 1990 election, he was succeeded by John Robertson.

The electorate was re-created for the 2008 election with Judith Collins, MP of the abolished Clevedon electorate, winning the seat for every subsequent election until retirement prior to the 2026 election.

=== Members of Parliament ===
Key

National United NZ

Elections	Winner
1978 election	Merv Wellington
1981 election	Merv Wellington
1984 election	Merv Wellington
1987 election	Merv Wellington
1990 election	John Robertson^{1}
1993 election	John Robertson^{1}
(Electorate abolished 1996–2008)
2008 election	Judith Collins
2011 election	Judith Collins
2014 election	Judith Collins
2017 election	Judith Collins
2020 election	Judith Collins
2023 election	Judith Collins

^{1}Robertson defected to the United party in 1995.

=== List MPs ===
Members of Parliament elected from party lists in elections where that person also unsuccessfully contested the Papakura electorate. Unless otherwise stated, all MPs' terms began and ended at general elections.

Key Labour

Election	Winner
2020 election	Anahila Kanongata'a-Suisuiki

== Election results ==
=== 2026 election ===
The next election will be held on 7 November 2026. Candidates for Papakura are listed at Candidates in the 2026 New Zealand general election by electorate § Papakura. Official results will be available after 27 November 2026.

=== 2023 election ===
2023 general election: Papakura
Notes:	Blue background denotes the winner of the electorate vote. Pink background denotes a candidate elected from their party list. Yellow background denotes an electorate win by a list member, or other incumbent. A ✓ or ✗ denotes status of any incumbent, win or lose respectively.						
Party	Candidate	Votes	%	±%	Party votes	%	±%
National	✓ Judith Collins	24,109	57.79	+5.34	22,042	51.67	+14.76
Labour	Anahila Kanongata'a-Suisuiki	10,590	25.38	−9.53	8,893	20.84	−21.67
ACT	Mike McCormick	3,121	7.48	—	4,264	10	+1.24
NZ First	Robert Monds	1,728	4.14	+1.96	2,238	5.25	+2.49
NZ Loyal	Donna Kouka	636	1.52	—	418	0.98	—
Vision New Zealand	Kathy Harvey	444	1.06	—			
Independent	Karin Kerr	427	1.02	—			
Animal Justice					61	0.14	—
Legalise Cannabis					162	0.38	+0.01
DemocracyNZ					62	0.15	—
Freedoms NZ					210	0.49	—
Green					2,710	6.35	+2.33
Leighton Baker Party					11	0.03	—
New Conservatives					55	0.13	−1.44
New Nation					19	0.04	—
NewZeal					260	0.61	—
Te Pāti Māori					451	1.06	+0.74
Opportunities					542	1.27	—
Women's Rights					33	0.08	—
Informal votes		666			225		
Total valid votes		41,721			42,656		
National hold	Majority	13,519	32.40	+18.32			

=== 2020 election ===
2020 general election: Papakura
Notes:	Blue background denotes the winner of the electorate vote. Pink background denotes a candidate elected from their party list. Yellow background denotes an electorate win by a list member, or other incumbent. A ✓ or ✗ denotes status of any incumbent, win or lose respectively.						
Party	Candidate	Votes	%	±%	Party votes	%	±%
National	✓ Judith Collins	19,420	52.45	−2.28	14,854	36.91	−14.09
Labour	Anahila Kanongata'a-Suisuiki	13,837	34.91	+0.40	17,106	42.51	+9.16
Green	Sue Cowie	1,953	4.93	—	1,618	4.02	+1.21
ACT	Bruce Whitehead	1,464	3.69	—	3,525	8.76	+8.20
NZ First	Robert Monds	828	2.09	−5.41	1,112	2.76	−6.00
Conservative	David Arvidson	792	2.00	—	631	1.57	+1.26
Advance NZ	Vikki-Lee Pomare	328	0.83	—	277	0.69	—
Outdoors	Teena Smith	234	0.59	—	36	0.09	+0.03
Opportunities					328	0.82	−0.37
Legalise Cannabis					149	0.37	+0.07
Māori Party					127	0.32	−0.31
Vision New Zealand					108	0.27	—
ONE					56	0.14	—
TEA					38	0.09	—
Heartland					25	0.06	—
Sustainable NZ					24	0.06	—
Social Credit					12	0.03	—
Informal votes		785			214		
Total valid votes		39,641			40,240		
National hold	Majority	5,583	14.08	−6.14			

=== 2017 election ===
2017 general election: Papakura
Notes:	Blue background denotes the winner of the electorate vote. Pink background denotes a candidate elected from their party list. Yellow background denotes an electorate win by a list member, or other incumbent. A ✓ or ✗ denotes status of any incumbent, win or lose respectively.						
Party	Candidate	Votes	%	±%	Party votes	%	±%
National	✓ Judith Collins	20,266	54.73	+8.66	19,464	51.00	−0.01
Labour	Jesse Pabla	12,780	34.51	+3.57	12,730	33.35	+7.55
NZ First	Toa Greening	2,778	7.50	−2.47	3,338	8.74	−2.01
Māori Party	Raewyn Teresa Bhana	607	1.63	+0.92	242	0.63	+0.14
Green					1,074	2.81	−2.66
Opportunities					455	1.19	—
ACT					215	0.56	−0.07
Conservative					119	0.31	−3.81
Legalise Cannabis					116	0.30	−0.06
People's Party					111	0.29	—
Ban 1080					24	0.06	−0.01
Outdoors					24	0.06	—
United Future					19	0.04	−0.13
Mana					17	0.04	−0.75 (Note: 2017 Mana Party swing is relative to the votes for Internet-Mana in 2014; it shared a party list with the Internet Party in the 2014 election)
Democrats					8	0.02	−0.01
Internet					8	0.02	−0.77 (Note: 2017 Internet Party swing is relative to the votes for Internet-Mana in 2014; it shared a party list with Mana Party in the 2014 election)
Informal votes		597			198		
Total valid votes		37,028			38,162		
National hold	Majority	7,486	20.22	+5.09			

=== 2014 election ===
2014 general election: Papakura
Notes:	Blue background denotes the winner of the electorate vote. Pink background denotes a candidate elected from their party list. Yellow background denotes an electorate win by a list member, or other incumbent. A ✓ or ✗ denotes status of any incumbent, win or lose respectively.						
Party	Candidate	Votes	%	±%	Party votes	%	±%
National	✓ Judith Collins	15,588	46.07	−13.52	17,733	51.01	−1.61
Labour	Jerome Mika	10,469	30.94	+3.92	8,967	25.80	−1.41
NZ First	Brent Catchpole	3,374	9.97	+4.31	3,737	10.75	+2.26
Green	Caroline Conroy	1,790	5.29	+0.29	1,801	5.47	−0.29
Conservative	Kevin Stitt	1,292	3.82	+1.78	1,431	4.12	+1.06
ACT	John Thompson	412	1.22	+0.52	331	0.63	−0.42
Māori Party	Ann Kendall	239	0.71	+0.71	172	0.49	−0.14
Mana	Roger Fowler	174	0.51	+0.51			
Internet Mana					275	0.79	+0.29 (Note: 2014 Internet Mana swing is relative to the votes for Mana in 2011; it shared a party list with Internet in the 2014 election.)
Legalise Cannabis					124	0.36	−0.12
United Future					60	0.17	−0.19
Ban 1080					23	0.07	+0.07
Civilian					20	0.06	+0.06
Democrats					9	0.03	±0.00
Focus					5	0.01	+0.01
Independent Coalition					4	0.01	+0.01
Informal votes		499			186		
Total valid votes		33,837			34,765		
Turnout		34,765	73.57	+1.97			
National hold	Majority	5,119	15.13	−17.44			

Electorate (as at 4 October 2014): 45,992

=== 2011 election ===
2011 general election: Papakura
Notes:	Blue background denotes the winner of the electorate vote. Pink background denotes a candidate elected from their party list. Yellow background denotes an electorate win by a list member, or other incumbent. A ✓ or ✗ denotes status of any incumbent, win or lose respectively.						
Party	Candidate	Votes	%	±%	Party votes	%	±%
National	✓ Judith Collins	18,096	59.59	−0.10	16,640	52.62	+1.14
Labour	Jerome Mika	8,206	27.02	−0.07	8,603	27.21	−2.11
NZ First	Brent Catchpole	1,718	5.66	+0.89	2,680	8.48	+3.40
Green	Caroline Conroy	1,519	5.00	+0.93	1,731	5.47	+2.51
Conservative	Bob Daw	619	2.04	+2.04	967	3.06	+3.06
ACT	John Thompson	212	0.70	−2.65	331	1.05	−5.03
Māori Party					183	0.58	−0.35
Mana					159	0.50	+0.50
Legalise Cannabis					152	0.48	+0.10
United Future					133	0.42	−0.41
Libertarianz					22	0.07	+0.04
Democrats					11	0.03	+0.02
Alliance					9	0.03	−0.03
Informal votes		814			250		
Total valid votes		30,370			31,621		
National hold	Majority	9,890	32.57	−0.03			

Electorate (as at 26 November 2011): 44,164

=== 2008 election ===
2008 general election: Papakura
Notes:	Blue background denotes the winner of the electorate vote. Pink background denotes a candidate elected from their party list. Yellow background denotes an electorate win by a list member, or other incumbent. A ✓ or ✗ denotes status of any incumbent, win or lose respectively.						
Party	Candidate	Votes	%	±%	Party votes	%	±%
National	✓ Judith Collins	18,816	59.68		16,672	51.48	
Labour	David Hereora	8,539	27.09		9,493	29.31	
NZ First	Brent Catchpole	1,504	4.77		1,643	5.07	
Green	Rachel Grimwood	1,283	4.07		961	2.97	
ACT	John Thompson	1,057	3.35		1,967	6.07	
United Future	Bryan Penquinn Mockridge	225	0.71		269	0.83	
RAM	Pat O'Dea	102	0.32		14	0.04	
Māori Party					300	0.93	
Progressive					254	0.78	
Pacific					247	0.76	
Bill and Ben					177	0.55	
Family Party					143	0.44	
Legalise Cannabis					124	0.38	
Kiwi					76	0.23	
Alliance					18	0.06	
Workers Party					9	0.03	
Libertarianz					8	0.02	
Democrats					5	0.02	
RONZ					3	0.01	
Informal votes		418			188		
Total valid votes		31,526			32,383		
National win new seat	Majority	10,277	32.60				
