= John Robertson (New Zealand politician, born 1951) =

New Zealand politician

John Robertson QSO
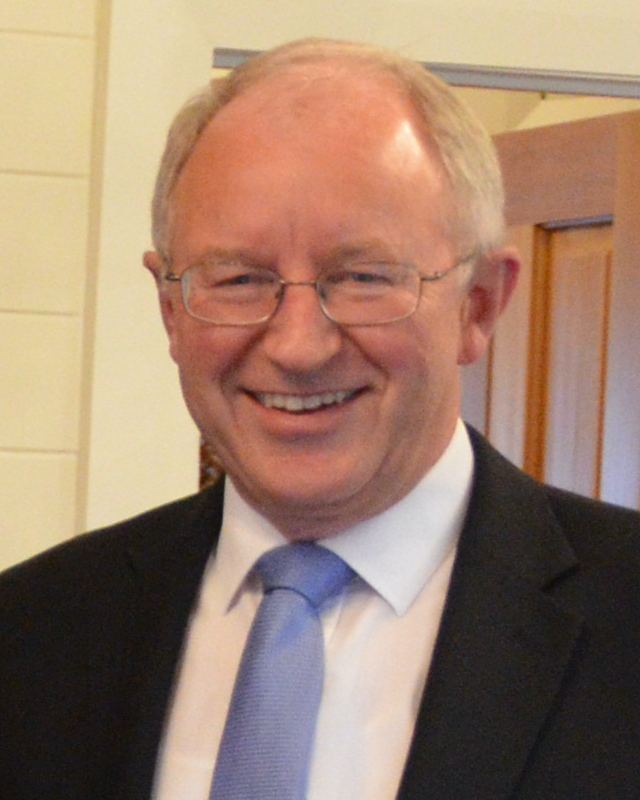
- Robertson in 2014

Mayor of Waitomo
- In office 12 October 2019 – present
- Preceded by: Brian Hanna

Mayor of Papakura
- In office 9 October 2004 – 13 October 2007
- Preceded by: David Buist
- Succeeded by: Calum Penrose

Member of the New Zealand Parliament for Papakura
- In office 27 October 1990 – 12 October 1996
- Preceded by: Merv Wellington
- Succeeded by: Electorate disestablished

Personal details
- Born: 6 December 1951 (age 74) Auckland, New Zealand
- Party: New Zealand National Party, United New Zealand

John Struan Robertson QSO (born 6 December 1951) is a New Zealand politician and company director.

Robertson was elected to the New Zealand House of Representatives in 1990 as the Member of Parliament for Papakura. A centrist and originally a member of the New Zealand National Party, he changed allegiance to the United New Zealand Party in 1995. He has twice served in local government: as Papakura city mayor from 2004 to 2007 and as Waitomo district mayor since 2019.

== Member of Parliament ==
New Zealand Parliament
Years	Term	Electorate	Party
1990–1993	43rd	Papakura	National
1993–1995	44th	Papakura	National
1995–1996	Changed allegiance to:		United NZ

After a career as a chartered accountant, Robertson was elected to the New Zealand House of Representatives 1990 as the Member of Parliament for Papakura. He succeeded the retiring former Minister of Education, Merv Wellington. Robertson was re-elected in the 1993 general election.

In 1995, he was one of seven centrist MPs who established United New Zealand. Robertson's Papakura electorate was disestablished before the 1996 election; he stood instead for Hunua where he finished second to National's Warren Kyd. United New Zealand did not poll high enough to be entitled to any list MPs, so Robertson left Parliament.

== Local government career ==
Robertson was later appointed chair of Infrastructure Auckland, a council-owned organisation which ran the Ports of Auckland and owned the America's Cup village. He served in this role from 2000 to 2004.

He was elected Mayor of Papakura and served from 2004 to 2007, when he was defeated. After his election loss he became dean of business at Manukau Institute of Technology.

In August 2012, the elected councillors of Kaipara District Council were replaced with a four-member commission as a result of serious governance and financial failures. Robertson was appointed as the chair of the commission. While Local Government Minister David Carter initially said that this commission was expected to remain until October 2015, it was not removed until October 2016.

Robertson contested and won the Waitomo district mayoralty in the 2019 local elections, defeating incumbent Brian Hanna. He was re-elected in 2022.

== Honours ==
In the 2008 Queen's Birthday Honours, Robertson was appointed a Companion of the Queen's Service Order for public services and services to local body affairs.

New Zealand Parliament
Preceded by Merv Wellington	Member of Parliament for Papakura; 1990–1996	Vacant Constituency abolished, recreated in 2008 Title next held by Judith Collins
Political offices
Preceded by David Buist	Mayor of Papakura; 2004–2007	Succeeded by Calum Penrose
