= Rangitata (electorate) =

- Single-member general constituency for the New Zealand House of Representatives
- Interactive map of boundaries from the 2026 election
- Formation: 1887, 1893, 2008
- Region: Canterbury
- Character: Rural
- Term: 3 years

Member for Rangitata
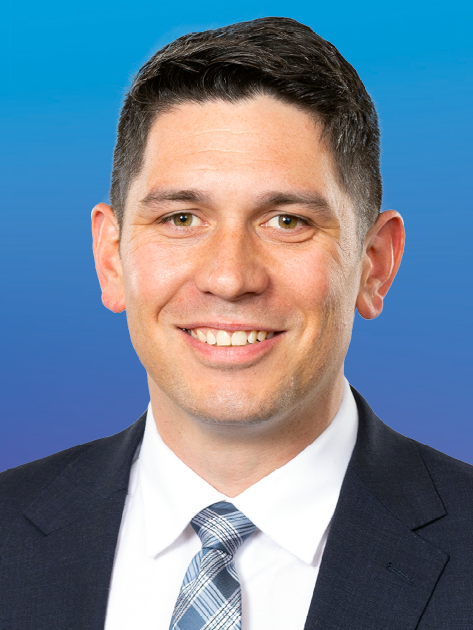
- James Meager since 14 October 2023
- Party: National
- Previous MP: Jo Luxton (Labour)
Party vote distribution

Rangitata is an electorate in the South Island of New Zealand. It first existed for two parliamentary terms in the late 19th century and was re-established for the 2008 general election. It largely replaced the Aoraki electorate, but included parts of the Rakaia electorate as well.

It is held by James Meager of the National Party following the 2023 general election. Previously it was held by Jo Luxton of the Labour Party following the 2020 general election, and Andrew Falloon of the National Party from the 2017 election. Rangitata was a relatively safe National seat until it changed to the Labour Party in the 2020 general election. Following the 2023 general election, the New Zealand National Party regained the seat.

The electorate includes both rural areas, and towns such as Timaru and Temuka, these two towns being Labour strongholds giving the electorate a different composition to its more conservative neighbours Selwyn and Waitaki.

== Population centres ==
In the 1887 electoral redistribution, although the Representation Commission was required through the Representation Act 1887 to maintain existing electorates "as far as possible", rapid population growth in the North Island required the transfer of three seats from the South Island to the north. Ten new electorates were created, including Rangitata, and one former electorate was recreated.

Map of boundaries at the 2020 and 2023 general elections

The boundaries of the Rangitata electorate were adjusted in the 2013/14 review, when an area around Rakaia was transferred to the Selwyn electorate. The boundary shifted eastwards again in the 2019/20 review, when the boundary was aligned with the Rakaia River.

The current electorate includes the following population centres (with approximate populations in brackets):

- Ashburton (20,000)
- Methven (1,300)
- Temuka (4,000)
- Timaru (42,800)

== History ==
The Rangitata electorate was first established for the 1887 election. The election was contested by William Rolleston, who had represented Geraldine in the previous Parliament, Searby Buxton, and William Palmer. Buxton beat Rolleston, who had been in Parliament since 1868, by 588 to 507 votes, with Palmer receiving 14 votes. Buxton held the electorate until the end of the term in 1890, when the electorate was abolished again.

The electorate was re-established for the 1893 election and won by William Maslin, who served until the end of the parliamentary term in 1896. The electorate was again abolished at the end of that term.

The present electorate, established for the 2008 election, consists of the old Aoraki electorate, and those parts of the old Rakaia electorate not included in the Selwyn electorate.

It was created after a review of electoral boundaries conducted in the wake of the 2006 census, which showed that there had been a general northwards population movement. Even though the number of South Island electorates was fixed, the decline in the population of electorates from Rakaia south resulted in the boundaries of electorates from Invercargill north to Rakaia shifting northwards. At the time of the formation of the Rangitata electorate, Jo Goodhew was the incumbent in the Aoraki electorate. She held the Rangitata electorate since its creation and in the 2014 election, she more than doubled her majority.

Goodhew announced in January 2017 that she would not be contesting the 2017 general election after being dropped from cabinet. The electorate was won at the election by Andrew Falloon, retaining it for the National Party.

In mid-July 2020, Falloon announced that he would not be seeking re-election at the 2020 general election, citing personal reasons following the suicide of a friend. Following reports that Falloon had sent pornographic images to several women, he resigned as the Member for Rangitata under pressure from National Party leader Judith Collins.

On 9 August 2020, the National Party nominated Environment Canterbury councillor Megan Hands as their new candidate for Rangitata. During the 2020 general election held on 17 October, the Labour Party's candidate Jo Luxton captured Rangitata from National, defeating Hands by a final margin of 4,408 votes.

=== Members of Parliament ===
Key

Independent Liberal National Labour

Election	Winner
1887 election	Searby Buxton
(Electorate abolished 1890–1893)
1893 election	William Maslin
(Electorate abolished 1896–2008)
2008 election	Jo Goodhew
2011 election	Jo Goodhew
2014 election	Jo Goodhew
2017 election	Andrew Falloon (Note: Falloon resigned as the MP for Rangitata on 21 July 2020. As this date was closer than 6 months to the general election in October, a vacancy existed until the election.)
2020 election	Jo Luxton
2023 election	James Meager

=== List MPs ===
Members of Parliament elected from party lists in elections where that person also unsuccessfully contested the electorate. Unless otherwise stated, all MPs terms began and ended at general elections.

Election	Winner
2017 election	Jo Luxton
2023 election	Jo Luxton

== Election results ==
=== 2026 election ===
The next election will be held on 7 November 2026. Candidates for Rangitata are listed at Candidates in the 2026 New Zealand general election by electorate § Rangitata. Official results will be available after 27 November 2026.

=== 2023 election ===
2023 general election: Rangitata
Notes:	Blue background denotes the winner of the electorate vote. Pink background denotes a candidate elected from their party list. Yellow background denotes an electorate win by a list member, or other incumbent. A ✓ or ✗ denotes status of any incumbent, win or lose respectively.						
Party	Candidate	Votes	%	±%	Party votes	%	±%
National	James Meager	22,792	56.33	+16.49	18,167	44.9	+13.42
Labour	✗ Jo Luxton	11,946	29.52	−20.81	10,660	26.34	−22.51
NZ First	Robert Ballantyne	2,159	5.34	+5.34	3,010	7.43	+5.43
Green	Barbara Gilchrist	1,784	4.41	+2.3	2,351	5.81	+2.69
NZ Loyal	Wayne Shearer	755	1.87	+1.87	586	1.45	+1.45
New Conservatives	Karl Thomas	310	0.70	−1.91	148	0.37	−1.64
Independent	Michael Clarkson	170	0.26	+0.26			
New Nation	Dolf Van Amersfoort	92	0.23	+0.23	55	0.14	+0.14
ACT					4,082	10.1	+0.44
Opportunities					522	1.3	+0.33
Legalise Cannabis					211	0.52	+0.04
Te Pāti Māori					156	0.39	+0.26
NewZeal					148	0.37	+0.37
DemocracyNZ					123	0.30	+0.30
Leighton Baker Party					75	0.19	+0.19
Freedoms NZ					68	0.17	+0.17
Animal Justice					62	0.15	+0.15
Women's Rights					37	0.09	+0.09
Informal votes		419			118		
Total valid votes		40,427			40,649		
National gain from Labour	Majority	10,846	26.81	+16.32			

=== 2020 election ===
2020 general election: Rangitata
Notes:	Blue background denotes the winner of the electorate vote. Pink background denotes a candidate elected from their party list. Yellow background denotes an electorate win by a list member, or other incumbent. A ✓ or ✗ denotes status of any incumbent, win or lose respectively.						
Party	Candidate	Votes	%	±%	Party votes	%	±%
Labour	Jo Luxton	21,147	50.33	+14.22	20,742	48.85	+15.35
National	Megan Hands	16,739	39.84	−12.96	13,368	31.48	−20.42
ACT	Hamish Hutton	1,394	3.32	+2.62	4,101	9.66	+9.15
New Conservative	Lachie Ashton	1,095	2.61	—	854	2.01	+1.75
Green	Gerrie Ligtenberg	852	2.03	−2.17	1,325	3.12	−0.35
Outdoors	Grant Kelynack	315	0.75	—	109	0.26	+0.18
Advance NZ	Aroha Maru	292	0.70	—	306	0.72	—
Social Credit	Brannon Favel	108	0.26	—	44	0.10	+0.08
Not A Party	James Rae	71	0.17	—			
NZ First					848	2.00	−4.00
Opportunities					414	0.97	−1.20
Legalise Cannabis					204	0.48	+0.12
Māori Party					55	0.13	−0.06
ONE					53	0.12	—
Sustainable NZ					20	0.05	—
Vision New Zealand					10	0.02	—
TEA					6	0.01	—
Heartland					5	0.01	—
Informal votes		703			407		
Total valid votes		42,013			42,464		
Labour gain from National	Majority	4,408	10.49	−6.26			

=== 2017 election ===
2017 general election: Rangitata
Notes:	Blue background denotes the winner of the electorate vote. Pink background denotes a candidate elected from their party list. Yellow background denotes an electorate win by a list member, or other incumbent. A ✓ or ✗ denotes status of any incumbent, win or lose respectively.						
Party	Candidate	Votes	%	±%	Party votes	%	±%
National	Andrew Falloon	19,994	52.8	−12.37	20,106	52.9	−2.42
Labour	Jo Luxton	13,663	36.1	+10.02	12,729	33.5	+11.32
Opportunities	Olly Wilson	1,828	4.8	—	825	2.17	—
Green	Mojo Mathers	1,583	4.2	—	1,321	3.47	−4
ACT	Tom Corbett	262	0.7	−0.6	193	0.51	+0.06
NZ First					2,281	6	−1.83
Legalise Cannabis					138	0.36	−0.24
Conservative					99	0.26	−4.09
Māori Party					71	0.19	−0.07
Ban 1080					41	0.11	−0.12
People's Party					35	0.09	—
Outdoors					30	0.08	—
United Future					25	0.07	−0.24
Democrats					8	0.02	−0.05
Mana					8	0.02	−0.37 (Note: 2017 Mana Party swing is relative to the votes for Internet-Mana in 2014; it shared a party list with the Internet Party in the 2014 election)
Internet					2	0.01	−0.38 (Note: 2017 Internet Party swing is relative to the votes for Internet-Mana in 2014; it shared a party list with Mana Party in the 2014 election)
Informal votes		473			131		
Total valid votes		37,803			38,043		
National hold	Majority	6,331	16.75	−22.34			

=== 2014 election ===
2014 general election: Rangitata
Notes:	Blue background denotes the winner of the electorate vote. Pink background denotes a candidate elected from their party list. Yellow background denotes an electorate win by a list member, or other incumbent. A ✓ or ✗ denotes status of any incumbent, win or lose respectively.						
Party	Candidate	Votes	%	±%	Party votes	%	±%
National	✓ Jo Goodhew	23,518	65.17	+9.40	20,108	55.32	+1.66
Labour	Steven Gibson	9,411	26.08	−11.07	8,064	22.18	−4.78
Conservative	Oliver Vitali	1,577	4.37	+4.37	1,580	4.35	+1.95
ACT	Tom Corbett	469	1.30	+0.46	165	0.45	−0.57
NZ First					2,848	7.83	+2.03
Green					2,715	7.47	−0.58
Legalise Cannabis					217	0.60	−0.04
Internet Mana					142	0.39	+0.30 (Note: 2014 Internet Mana swing is relative to the votes for Mana in 2011; it shared a party list with Internet in the 2014 election.)
United Future					114	0.31	−0.54
Māori Party					94	0.26	−0.08
Ban 1080					84	0.23	+0.23
Democrats					24	0.07	+0.02
Civilian					20	0.06	+0.06
Independent Coalition					13	0.04	+0.04
Focus					9	0.02	+0.02
Informal votes		1,111			154		
Total valid votes		36,086			36,351		
Turnout		36,351	78.23	+3.41			
National hold	Majority	14,107	39.09	+20.47			

=== 2011 election ===
2011 general election: Rangitata
Notes:	Blue background denotes the winner of the electorate vote. Pink background denotes a candidate elected from their party list. Yellow background denotes an electorate win by a list member, or other incumbent. A ✓ or ✗ denotes status of any incumbent, win or lose respectively.						
Party	Candidate	Votes	%	±%	Party votes	%	±%
National	✓ Jo Goodhew	19,580	55.77	−2.09	19,282	53.66	+5.09
Labour	Julian Blanchard	13,043	37.15	+0.86	9,687	26.96	−7.89
Green	Gerrie Ligtenberg	1,766	5.03	+5.03	2,894	8.05	+3.85
United Future	Andrew McMillan	418	1.19	+0.58	307	0.85	−0.01
ACT	Tom Corbett	303	0.86	−0.88	367	1.02	−2.75
NZ First					2,084	5.80	+2.03
Conservative					863	2.40	+2.40
Legalise Cannabis					229	0.64	+0.10
Māori Party					123	0.34	+0.03
Mana					32	0.09	+0.09
Alliance					24	0.07	−0.04
Libertarianz					20	0.06	+0.03
Democrats					19	0.05	+0.02
Informal votes		970			351		
Total valid votes		35,110			35,931		
National hold	Majority	6,537	18.62	−2.95			

Electorate (as at 26 November 2011): 48,024

=== 2008 election ===
2008 general election: Rangitata
Notes:	Blue background denotes the winner of the electorate vote. Pink background denotes a candidate elected from their party list. Yellow background denotes an electorate win by a list member, or other incumbent. A ✓ or ✗ denotes status of any incumbent, win or lose respectively.						
Party	Candidate	Votes	%	±%	Party votes	%	±%
National	Jo Goodhew	21,759	57.86		18,441	48.57	
Labour	Julian Blanchard	13,647	36.29		13,230	34.85	
Kiwi	Tony Bunting	759	2.02		378	1.00	
ACT	Peter McCaw	655	1.74		1,431	3.77	
Independent	Paul Tew	555	1.48				
United Future	Brian Ward	230	0.61		329	0.87	
Green					1,597	4.21	
NZ First					1,431	3.77	
Bill and Ben					333	0.88	
Progressive					329	0.87	
Legalise Cannabis					204	0.54	
Māori Party					118	0.31	
Family Party					54	0.14	
Alliance					42	0.11	
Workers Party					16	0.04	
Democrats					12	0.03	
Libertarianz					8	0.02	
Pacific					7	0.02	
RONZ					5	0.01	
RAM					3	0.01	
Informal votes		457			272		
Total valid votes		37,605			37,968		
National win new seat	Majority	8,112	21.57				
