= Wayne Thomas Patterson =

New Zealand fraudster

Wayne Thomas Patterson is a fraudster who used 123 different identities to defraud the Ministry of Social Development (MSD) in New Zealand of an estimate $3.48 million in welfare benefits during 2003 and 2006.

In 2023 Patterson was again convicted and sentenced to four years and nine months prison on charges of burglary, accessing a computer system for dishonesty, arson, attempted arson and theft, following an attempt to purchase gold online using access to the home of a Martinborough couple he had while working as an electrical tradesman.
