= Jenny Bloxham =

New Zealand politician

Jenny Bloxham (born 1949) is a former New Zealand politician.

== Career before politics ==
Before entering Parliament Bloxham was an IHC community support worker and owned a masonry business together with her husband Rod.

== Political career ==
Bloxham first became involved with politics in 1981 when she joined the Labour Party and from 1987 to 1990 she was a member of Labour's national council. In 1993 she contested the Labour nomination for the Timaru electorate, but lost to Jim Sutton as she "...knew there was no way the Timaru Labour Party would select me because of my gender for one thing." By then she was totally disillusioned with Labour particularly the Rogernomics economic reforms and immediately joined New Zealand First upon the party's foundation.

At the 1993 general election she stood as the New Zealand First candidate in Timaru, finishing fourth. In 1994 she was elected vice-president of New Zealand First and party spokesperson for health.

=== Member of Parliament ===
New Zealand Parliament
Years	Term	Electorate	List	Party
1996–1999	45th	List	5	NZ First

She was an MP from 1996 to 1999, representing the New Zealand First party. She was first elected to Parliament in the 1996 election as a list MP, after standing in the Aoraki electorate. When New Zealand First splintered in 1998, she was one of the MPs who remained with the party core.

At the 1999 election, however, she was ranked in 22nd place on the New Zealand First party list, a surprisingly low position for a sitting MP. She was not returned to Parliament.
