= Ministry of Youth Development (New Zealand) =

New Zealand youth development government department

Agency overview
- Formed: 1 October 2003
- Preceding agency: Ministry of Youth Affairs
- Jurisdiction: New Zealand
- Minister responsible: Hon James Meager, Minister for Youth
- Agency executive: John Robertson, General manager
- Website: www.myd.govt.nz

The Ministry of Youth Development (MYD; Te Manatū Whakahiato Taiohi) is a New Zealand government department that is responsible for promoting positive youth development among young people aged between 12 and 24 years. It is administered by the Ministry of Social Development (MSD). It was created in October 2003 through the merger of the former Ministry of Youth Affairs with the youth policy functions of MSD. The Ministry comes under the portfolio of the Minister for Youth.

== Mandate and functions ==
The Ministry of Youth Development seeks to foster a positive youth development approach among children and young people aged between 12 and 24 years. It supports the Minister for Youth in their portfolio. It is part of the Ministry of Social Development's "Māori, Communities and Partnerships" group.

MYD runs various youth development and youth enterprise programmes, services and initiatives. These include the Ākonga Youth Development Community Fund, which funds iwi (tribal) and community-based youth development programmes outside of traditional school settings. The Ministry also helps facility youth input into the New Zealand public policy process through programmes such as the Youth Advisory Group, The Hive, and the New Zealand Youth Parliament. The Ministry is also responsible for developing and implementing the Government's Youth Plan, which facilitates an all-government approach to young people's needs and issues under the Child and Youth Wellbeing Strategy. The Ministry is headed by "General Manager, Youth" John Robertson.

== History ==
The Ministry of Youth Development has its origins in the Ministry for Youth Affairs (MYA), which was established in 1988 to advocate for the needs of young people in government policy priorities and the public policy process. While the MYA succeeded in fostering positive youth development and developing strong relations with young people, the Ministry struggled with capability, capacity and maintaining cross-governmental relations. On 1 October 2003, the Ministry was succeeded by the Ministry of Youth Development, which was created through a merger of the MYA and the youth policy functions of the Ministry of Social Development.

In early July 2025, Radio New Zealand (RNZ) reported that MYD had advised several Youth MPs participating in the 2025 New Zealand Youth Parliament to remove references to contentious contemporary issues such as the Treaty Principles Bill, funding for Māori and Pasifika New Zealanders, and pay equity legislation. In addition, RNZ reported that the opposition Labour Party had complained that speeches about "youth voice" and "freedom of speech" had been edited. In response, MYD's general manager John Robertson said that the Ministry was merely following protocols that it had adopted in 2022 and had merely advised Youth MPs to avoid content that could put them at risk of court litigation, defamation, copyright violations or breaching broadcasting standards since they were not protected by parliamentary privilege. The Minister for Youth James Meager also issued a statement denying that Youth MPs' speeches had been censored. MYD and Meager's statements were disputed by several Youth MPs including Make It 16 co-director Thomas Brocherie, Gen Z Aotearoa spokesperson Nate Wilbourne and Lincoln Jones, who claimed that youth were being silenced. On 3 July, MYD issued a statement that it could have "better communicated" its email message to Youth MPs.
