= Ministry of Social Development (New Zealand) =

Government ministry of New Zealand

- Te Manatū Whakahiato Ora (Māori)

Agency overview
- Formed: 2001
- Jurisdiction: New Zealand
- Headquarters: The Aurora Conference Centre 56 The Terrace Wellington 6011
- Employees: 7,973 FTE staff (30 June 2020)
- Annual budget: Vote Social Development; Total budget for 2026/27 ▲$48,375,178,000
- Minister responsible: Hon Louise Upston, Minister for Social Development and Employment
- Agency executive: Debbie Power, Chief Executive
- Website: www.msd.govt.nz

The Ministry of Social Development (MSD; Māori: Te Manatū Whakahiato Ora) is the public service department of New Zealand charged with advising the New Zealand Government on social policy, and providing social services. MSD is the largest public service department, employing public servants in over 200 locations around New Zealand. MSD delivers its programmes and services through a number of business groups and agencies.

== Functions and responsibilities ==
The Ministry of Social Development is responsible for providing income support, superannuation, employment support, student loans and allowances, housing assistance, and allocating funding to community providers. It is also the Government's chief social policy adviser. MSD also designs and provides community services in conjunction with other organisations.

MSD also hosts several other government ministries and services including the Whaikaha - Ministry of Disabled People, Te Kāhui Kāhu (Social Services Accreditation), the Office for Seniors, and the Ministry of Youth Development. Between 2019 and 2023, the Ministry also hosted the Independent Children's Monitor, a children's ombudsman.

In October 2024, the Ministry regained responsibility for delivering disability support services from the Ministry of Disabled People.

== History ==
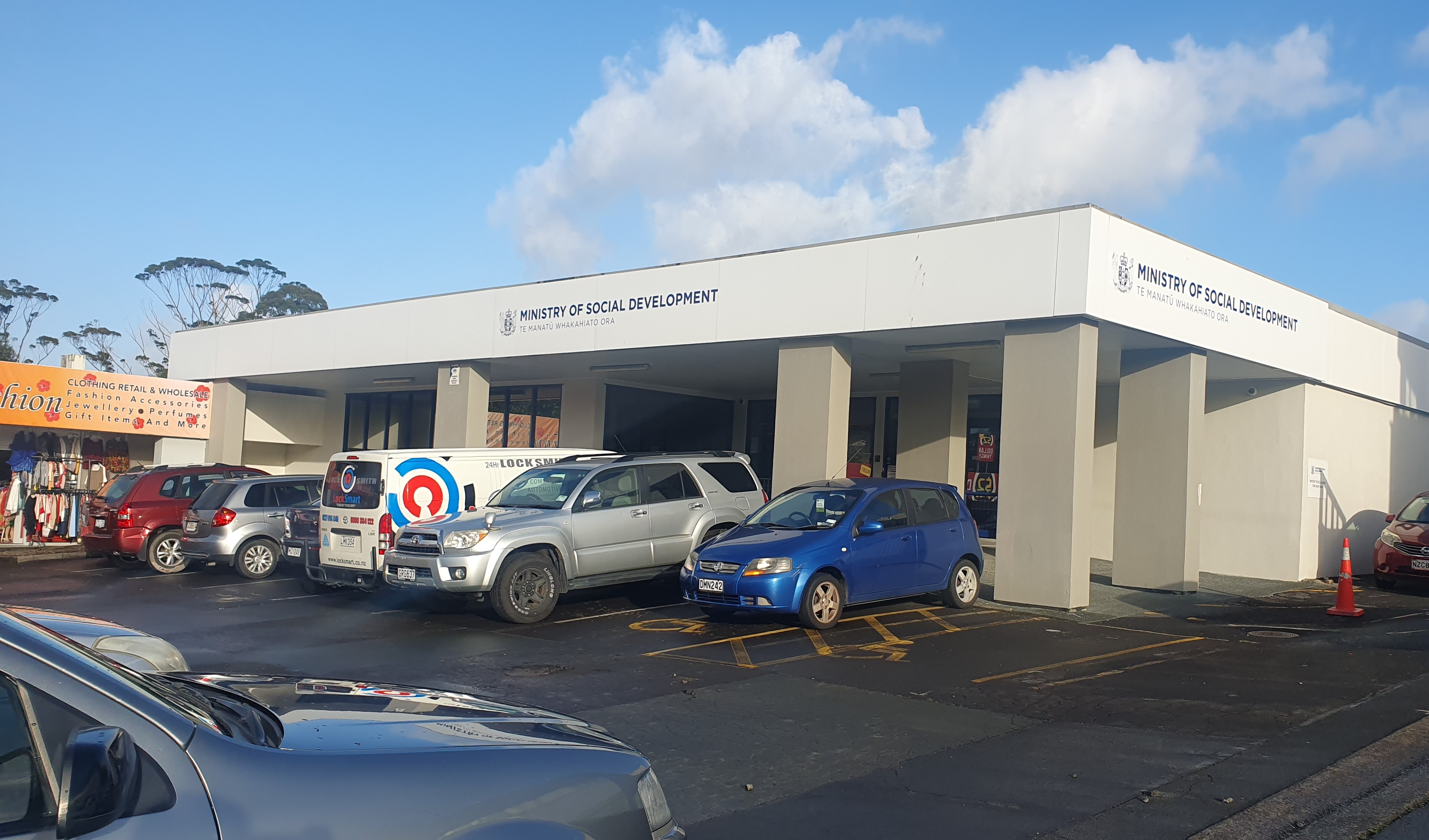
A Ministry of Social Development office in Glen Eden, West Auckland

=== 2000s ===
The Ministry of Social Development was created on 1 October 2001 through a merger of the Ministry of Social Policy and the Department of Work and Income. Some of the functions of the Ministry were historically performed by the Pensions Department, Social Security Department, the Department of Social Welfare, and the Department of Work and Income.

On 1 October 2003, the Ministry of Youth Development (MYD) was established through a merger of the former Ministry of Youth Affairs and the youth policy functions of MSD. MYD is subordinate to the Ministry of Youth Development and runs various youth programmes and initiatives including Ākonga Youth Development Community Fund and the New Zealand Youth Parliament.

On 1 July 2006, the former Department of Child, Youth and Family Services (CYFS) was integrated into MSD as a service line. On 1 March 2010, MSD established a Senior Services division. On 1 February 2011, the Office of the Community and Voluntary Sector was relocated from MSD to the Department of Internal Affairs. In July 2011, the Ministry of Commerce assumed responsibility for the Retirement Commission, which had previously been under MSD.

=== 2010s ===
On 20 August 2012, the Ministry established a Youth Service unit. On 14 April 2014, MSD assumed responsibility for social housing assessment and income-related rent subsidies. On 31 October 2017, the Ministry's CYFS service line was replaced by a new ministry, Oranga Tamariki (the Ministry for Children).

In 2019, the Independent Children's Monitor was established as a business unit within the Ministry of Social Development. In May 2023, the Children's Monitor was transferred to the Education Review Office with a wide mandate to oversee the Oranga Tamariki (Ministry for Children) system.

=== 2020s ===
In February 2021, the Auditor-General investigated a scheme by the Ministry of Social Development where private landlords were paid exorbitant rental rates for emergency housing; some of which was reportedly unfit for human habitation. In mid-December 2021, the Auditor-General released a report criticising the Ministry for paying more than NZ$37 million in inflated rents between November 2017 and June 2020 to private landlords and property managers to provide emergency housing for homeless people. The report found that the Ministry did not exercise control over rental prices which drove up rental rates. Social Development Minister Carmel Sepuloni expressed surprise that the Ministry had not consulted her, while the National Party's housing spokesperson Nicola Willis called for Sepuloni to hold the Ministry to account.

On 12 May 2024, RNZ reported that the Ministry had received almost 5,000 complaints related to staff's poor handling of clients looking for help and financial assistance. In response, the Ministry claimed that complaints represented less than 0.1% of its interactions with clients over the past two years. By 23 May, the Ministry announced plans to lay off 712 jobs as part of government cutbacks.

In early August 2024, RNZ reported that the Ministry would strengthen eligibility criteria and introduce new obligations for emergency housing tenants including a 13-weeks standing down period for those breaking rules from 26 August. New obligations include requiring those staying longer than a week to engage with support services and seek alternative accommodation and requiring people to pay their emergency housing obligations. These new rules were part of the Sixth National Government's to reduce the use of motels as emergency housing. Canterbury housing advocate Kevin Murray expressed concern about the impact of the new legislation on individuals with mental illness on supported living while Community Law CEO Sue Moroney expressed concern that the new rules would lead to a rise in homelessness. According to figures released by the Ministry between December 2023 and June 2024, the number of people living in emergency housing had declined from 3,141 to 2,133. Of this figure, 27% had move into social housing, 21% into transitional housing and 28% into private rentals. Community Housing Aotearoa deputy chief executive Chris Glaudel expressed concern that the remainder (estimated to be 200 families) could be sleeping in cars, garages or overcrowded homes.

In October 2024, the Sixth National Government transferred the delivery of Whaikaha - Ministry of Disabled People's disability support functions to the Ministry of Social Development as part of a restructuring of the latter as a policy and advisory government department. Disabled Persons Assembly chief executive and former Green Party MP Mojo Mathers, disability advocate Blake Forbes-Gentle, CCS Disability Action national policy analyst Phoebe Eden-Mann and Green Party disability spokesperson Kahurangi Carter criticised the government's restructuring decision, saying that it would adversely affect the ability of disabled people to access support services due what they regarded as MSD's "poor" track record of serving the disabled community.

On 12 March 2026, the Minister for Disabled Issues Louise Upston confirmed that the New Zealand Government would lift restrictions on support payments for disabled people and their carers from 1 April following a review into support system. Upston said that the changes reflected the recommendations of the 2024 independent review and feedback from the disabled community in 2025. The announcement was welcomed by several disability carers including Disability Support Service Transformation general manager Alastair Hill. Emily Writes, the former director of charity Awhi Nga Matua, criticised the Minister for not issuing an apology for the harm caused to disabled carers by the 2024 cutbacks.

== Ministers ==
The Ministry serves nine portfolios and eight ministers.

Officeholder	Portfolio(s)	Other responsibilities
Hon Louise Upston	Lead Minister (Ministry of Social Development); Minister for Social Development and Employment; Minister for Child Poverty Reduction; Minister for the Community and Voluntary Sector; Minister for Disability Issues	
Hon Nicola Willis	Minister for Social Investment	
Hon Penny Simmonds		Associate Minister for Social Development and Employment
Hon Chris Bishop	Minister of Housing	
Hon Tama Potaka		Associate Minister of Housing (Social Housing)
Hon Casey Costello	Minister for Seniors	
Hon James Meager	Minister for Youth	
Hon Karen Chhour	Minister for the Prevention of Family and Sexual violence	

== See also ==
- Social welfare in New Zealand
