= Richard Lewis (New Zealand politician) =

New Zealand politician (born 1969)

The Family Party candidate for Manurewa
- Election date 8 November 2008
- Opponent(s): George Hawkins, Cam Calder and various others
- Incumbent: George Hawkins

Personal details
- Born: 1969 (age 56–57) Auckland, New Zealand
- Party: Destiny (2003 – 2007); Family (2007 – 2010)
- Website: Profile at The Family Party's site

Richard Lewis (born 1969) is the former leader of two conservative Christian political parties in New Zealand, Destiny New Zealand and The Family Party. He led both these parties from their formation to deregistration.

Lewis was born in Auckland, New Zealand. At the age of twenty-two, he joined the New Zealand Police. He served as a police officer for eleven years. In 2001, he became the manager of Destiny Social Services, a branch of the Auckland-based Destiny Church. In 2003 Lewis was instrumental in the establishment of the Destiny New Zealand political party, which derived primarily from Destiny Church which is headed by Brian Tamaki.

The party went on to stand 42 candidates in the 2005 general election, and was one of only three parties to stand in all 7 Māori electorates. The party did not win any electorate seats and received 0.62% of the party vote, which did not meet the 5% threshold to achieve parliamentary representation. It was the highest polling party outside of parliament. Lewis himself stood as his party's candidate for Manukau East and came third behind the two major party candidates from Labour and National with 1,111 votes (3.4%).

In 2007, Destiny New Zealand was disbanded, with Lewis instead becoming leader of the newly formed The Family Party.

However, The Family Party failed to gain access into parliament again in the 2008 election. Lewis, who stood as the candidate for Manurewa, gained only 514 votes. The party deregistered in April 2010.
