= Andrew Falloon =

New Zealand politician

Member of the New Zealand Parliament for Rangitata
- In office 23 September 2017 – 21 July 2020
- Preceded by: Jo Goodhew
- Succeeded by: Jo Luxton
- Majority: 6,331

Personal details
- Born: 29 August 1983 (age 43) Ashburton, New Zealand
- Party: National
- Other political affiliations: ACT (formerly)

Andrew Hamilton Falloon (born 29 August 1983) is a former New Zealand politician, serving as a Member of Parliament in the House of Representatives for the National Party from 2017 until his resignation in July 2020.

== Early life ==
Falloon was born in Ashburton in 1983. He received his education at Allenton Primary School before boarding at Christchurch Boys’ High School. He attended the University of Canterbury to study political science and economics.

== Political career ==
At the 2005 and 2008 elections Falloon stood as a list-only candidate for ACT New Zealand. From 2007, he worked as a researcher at Parliament, before working in the ministerial offices of Rodney Hide, Phil Heatley and Steven Joyce.

=== Member of Parliament ===
New Zealand Parliament
Years	Term	Electorate	List	Party
2017–2020	52nd	Rangitata	61	National

At the 2017 general election, Falloon contested the electorate of Rangitata as a candidate for the National Party. Rangitata had been held by National since the electorate was created in 2008. Falloon won the electorate, defeating Labour candidate Jo Luxton by 6,331 votes. With the National Party in Opposition, Falloon was appointed as the party's spokesperson on South Island regional development during Simon Bridges' leadership, and spokesperson for biosecurity under the leadership of both Todd Muller and Judith Collins.

In 2020, Falloon voted for the Abortion Legislation Bill, which decriminalised abortion. He supported the End of Life Choice Bill, which aims to legalise voluntary euthanasia.

==== Resignation ====
On 20 July 2020, Falloon announced that he would not seek re-election at the 2020 general election, citing personal reasons following the suicide of a friend. It was later reported that he had sent a pornographic image to a 19-year-old female university student. The parents of the young woman emailed this information to prime minister Jacinda Ardern; Ardern's chief of staff notified National Party leader Judith Collins. Police investigated the matter but decided that sending the image did not meet the threshold for prosecution. According to The New Zealand Herald, Falloon claimed that he had left his phone unattended during the party and that one of his acquaintances had sent the image. Despite insisting that he had not sent the message, Falloon reportedly offered his resignation to Collins, which she accepted.

On 21 July 2020, Falloon resigned as a Member of Parliament effective immediately. His resignation accompanied media reports that he had sent two inappropriate images to two other women. Collins also stated that she "no longer trusted his story" of the incident with the first woman and "had lost confidence in him." After his resignation a total of “at least five" women have reported similar behaviour by Falloon. In response to complaints that Falloon had sent unsolicited explicit messages to multiple women, the New Zealand Police launched an investigation into the former National MP, but at the conclusion of the investigation, Police decided not to press charges against him.

New Zealand Parliament
Preceded by Jo Goodhew	Member of Parliament for Rangitata; 2017–2020	Succeeded by Jo Luxton
