= Jo Luxton =

New Zealand politician

The Honourable Jo Luxton MP
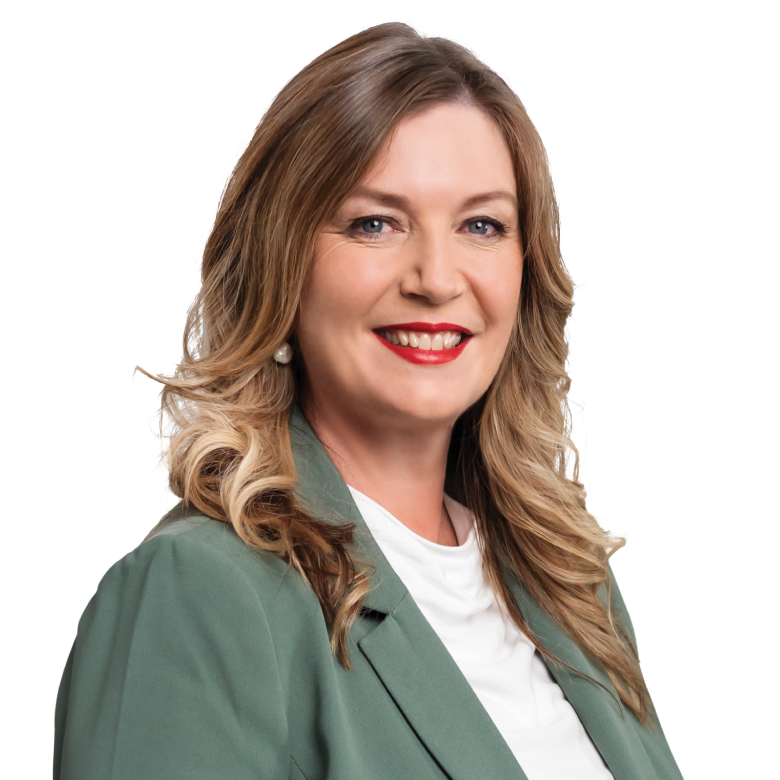
- Luxton in 2023

66th Minister of Customs
- In office 8 May 2023 – 27 November 2023
- Prime Minister: Chris Hipkins
- Preceded by: Damien O'Connor (acting)
- Succeeded by: Casey Costello

Member of the New Zealand Parliament for Labour Party list
- Incumbent
- Assumed office 14 October 2023
- In office 23 September 2017 – 17 October 2020

Member of the New Zealand Parliament for Rangitata
- In office 17 October 2020 – 14 October 2023
- Preceded by: Andrew Falloon
- Succeeded by: James Meager

Personal details
- Born: 1973 (age 52–53)
- Party: Labour (2013–present)
- Spouse: Matt
- Children: 3
- Relatives: Norman Kirk (great-uncle)

Jo-Anne Marie Luxton (born 1973) is a New Zealand politician. She has been a Member of Parliament in the House of Representatives for the Labour Party since the 2017 general election.

Before her political career, Luxton was an early childhood educator. From 8 May to 27 November 2023, she was Minister of Customs and Associate Minister of Education, with responsibility for early childhood education, in the Sixth Labour Government.

== Early life, career and family ==
Luxton was born to parents Jim, a builder, and Margaret Thompson in Rotorua. She has two younger sisters. The family moved around the North Island during Luxton's childhood and she was raised mainly in Gisborne, where she attended Campion College and Lytton High School.

In her twenties, Luxton moved to Ashburton with her then-husband, a farm worker, and worked on a dairy farm with him. When their marriage broke up, she created an early childhood centre called Headstart Early Learning Centre. Luxton had a twenty-year career in early childhood education before her election to Parliament in 2017. She owned and operated the Hinds Early Learning Centre, which was an accredited living wage employer.

Luxton is the great-niece of former Labour Prime Minister Norman Kirk. She is of Māori descent, through her mother's biological father, which she did not learn until about 2004. She has a blended family of five children with her second husband, a builder, and is also the guardian of her younger sister who has Down syndrome.

== Political career ==
New Zealand Parliament
Years	Term	Electorate	List	Party
2017–2020	52nd	List	29	Labour
2020–2023	53rd	Rangitata	39	Labour
2023–2026	54th	List	19	Labour
2026–present	55th	List	17	Labour

=== First term, 2017–2020 ===
Luxton became involved with the Labour Party in 2013 and became the chairperson of her local party branch. In 2016, she was selected as the Labour candidate for Rangitata electorate in the 2017 election. She was ranked 29 on Labour's party list.

Luxton did not win the electorate, which had been held by the National Party since 2005, but entered parliament as a list MP. She was the second speaker in the address in reply debate on 8 November 2017. Her maiden speech highlighted her views that education "needs to be free and accessible to everyone [because] it could mean the difference between living a decent life and contributing to society in a positive way, and ending up in our overcrowded prisons." She also acknowledged former Labour MP Maryan Street as a political mentor.

In her first term, Luxton sat on the education and workforce committee and was deputy chairperson of each of the committees for primary production (until August 2018), economic development, science and innovation (from August 2018 until July 2019) and regulations review (from July 2019 until September 2020). She was briefly responsible for a member's bill, previously in the name of Sue Moroney, which proposed to reinstate a general legal right for workers to have meal and rest breaks; this ultimately was adopted as government legislation.

=== Second term, 2020–2023 ===
At the 2020 New Zealand general election Luxton again ran in Rangitata for the Labour party. In what was regarded as a surprise victory, she defeated National's Megan Hands by a final margin of 4,408 votes. Rangitata had been traditionally regarded as a safe National seat. In her second term, Luxton continued to sit on the education and workforce committee and chaired the primary production committee. Each of those roles ended in February 2023 after her promotion into the executive.

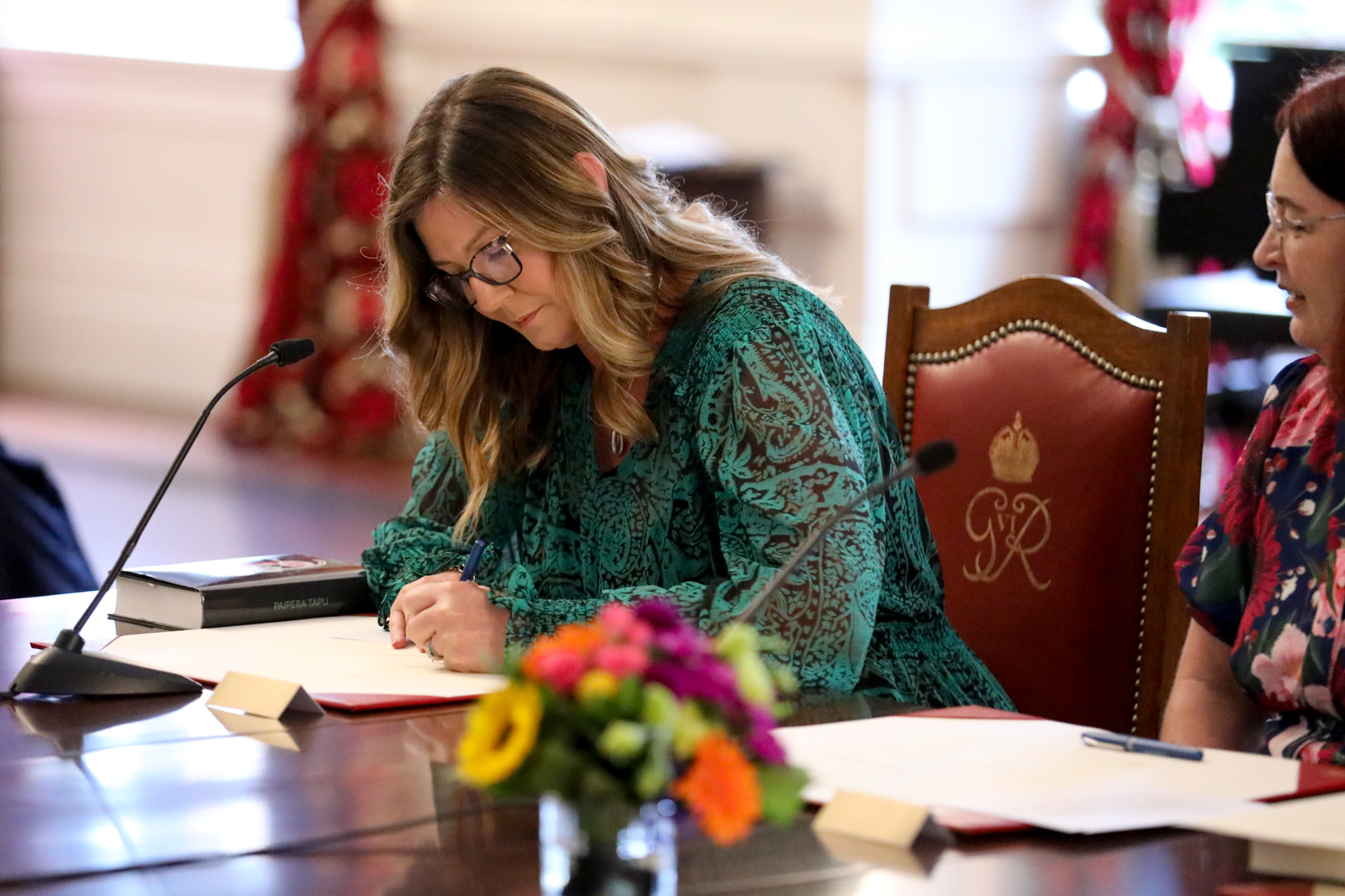
Luxton signing the oath during a ceremony at Government House, Wellington, on 1 February 2023 at which she was appointed a parliamentary under-secretary

In a cabinet reshuffle by Prime Minister Chris Hipkins on 31 January 2023, Luxton was appointed a parliamentary under-secretary to the Ministers of Agriculture and Education. In another cabinet reshuffle by Hipkins on 8 May 2023, caused by Meka Whaitiri resigning from the Labour Party, Luxton was appointed Minister of Customs and Associate Minister for Agriculture and Education. As customs minister, she oversaw the third reading of legislation that enabled arrival cards to be completed digitally from July 2023. In her associate minister roles, she had responsibility for animal welfare, residential and trades training for the food and fibre sector, early childhood education (ECE), Pacific education, and the Education Review Office. She announced salary increases for early childhood educators in August 2023, although it was reported that the government knew in September 2023 that it had a $253 million shortfall in ECE funding, which was not publicly known until after that month's election.

=== Third term, 2023–2026 ===
During the 2023 general election, Luxton was unseated by new National candidate James Meager by a margin of 10,846 votes. She was however re-elected on the Labour party list. After her electorate loss, Luxton closed her local offices in Timaru and Ashburton and eventually relocated to Gisborne. Labour did not remain in government and, in late November, Luxton was appointed opposition spokesperson for agriculture, biosecurity and rural communities in the Shadow Cabinet of Chris Hipkins. On 5 December 2023, Luxton was granted retention of the title The Honourable, in recognition of her term as a member of the Executive Council. She currently sits on the primary production committee.

Luxton would be selected to contest the East Cape electorate in the 2026 election. In March 2023, she gained the customs portfolio but lost the rural communities portfolio during a cabinet reshuffle.

=== Fourth term, 2026–present ===
During the 2026 election, Luxton contested the East Cape electorate for Labour. She was ranked 17th on the Labour Party list. Luxton came second place with 11,079 votes. She was re-elected to Parliament on the Labour Party list.

== Views and politics ==
=== Cannabis ===
In mid-September 2020, Luxton announced that she would not be voting in support of the Cannabis Legalisation and Control Bill referendum, citing her own personal experiences of being in relationship with a person who abused cannabis.

=== Euthanasia ===
Luxton has stated that she would be voting in favour of the End of Life Choice Act 2019 during the 2020 euthanasia referendum, citing her belief that people should be able to die with dignity and the experiences of her terminally ill mother.

=== Abortion ===
Luxton voted in favour of the Abortion Legislation Bill in 2019 and 2020.

New Zealand Parliament
Preceded by Andrew Falloon	Member of Parliament for Rangitata; 2020–2023	Succeeded by James Meager
Political offices
Preceded by Meka Whaitiri	Minister of Customs; 2023	Succeeded by Casey Costello
