= Aoraki (electorate) =

Aoraki was a New Zealand parliamentary electorate that existed for four parliamentary terms from 1996 to 2008. It was held by Jim Sutton of the Labour Party for three terms, and the remaining term by Jo Goodhew of the National Party. It was located in the South Island, covering southern Canterbury and northern Otago. It was named after the mountain Aoraki / Mount Cook.

== Population centres ==
The 1996 election was notable for the significant change of electorate boundaries, based on the provisions of the Electoral Act 1993. Because of the introduction of the mixed-member proportional (MMP) electoral system, the number of electorates had to be reduced, leading to significant changes. More than half of the electorates contested in 1996 were newly constituted, and most of the remainder had seen significant boundary changes. In total, 73 electorates were abolished, 29 electorates were newly created (including Aoraki), and 10 electorates were recreated, giving a net loss of 34 electorates.

== History ==
The electorate of Aoraki was created for the 1996 election, as part of the major redistribution in the transition to MMP. It was effectively a merger of the old seats of Timaru and Waitaki, bringing the town of Timaru and its surrounding farmland together in one electorate.

The boundaries of Aoraki did not undergo any significant changes since the seat was created. However, in boundary changes for the 2008 general election, Aoraki ceased to exist, with the bulk of its population centres being transferred to a resurrected electorate named Rangitata. The southern part went to Waitaki.

=== Election results ===
Key

Labour National

Election	Winner
1996 election	Jim Sutton
1999 election	Jim Sutton
2002 election	Jim Sutton
2005 election	Jo Goodhew
(Electorate abolished in 2008; see Rangitata)

=== List MPs ===
Members of Parliament elected from party lists in elections where that person also unsuccessfully contested the Aoraki electorate. Unless otherwise stated, all MPs terms began and ended at general elections.

Key

Labour NZ First

Election	Winner
1996 election	Jenny Bloxham
2005 election	Jim Sutton

== Election results ==
=== 2005 election ===
2005 general election: Aoraki
Notes:	Blue background denotes the winner of the electorate vote. Pink background denotes a candidate elected from their party list. Yellow background denotes an electorate win by a list member, or other incumbent. A ✓ or ✗ denotes status of any incumbent, win or lose respectively.						
Party	Candidate	Votes	%	±%	Party votes	%	±%
National	Jo Goodhew	18,252	54.03		14,635	43.01	
Labour	✗ Jim Sutton	11,315	33.49		13,596	39.96	
Green	Kate Elsen	2,038	6.03		1,524	4.48	
NZ First	Kerry Lundy	1,203	3.56		2,048	6.02	
United Future	Mark Rogers	340	1.01		878	2.58	
Progressive	Claire Main	320	0.95		523	1.54	
ACT	Kevin Murray	215	0.64		398	1.17	
Direct Democracy	John Sullivan	99	0.29		19	0.06	
Legalise Cannabis					130	0.38	
Destiny					91	0.27	
Māori Party					38	0.11	
Christian Heritage					31	0.09	
Democrats					30	0.09	
Alliance					24	0.07	
99 MP					19	0.06	
Family Rights					13	0.04	
Libertarianz					6	0.02	
One NZ					3	0.01	
RONZ					3	0.01	
Informal votes		255			137		
Total valid votes		33,782			34,027		
National gain from Labour	Majority	6,937	20.39				

=== 2002 election ===
2002 general election: Aoraki
Notes:	Blue background denotes the winner of the electorate vote. Pink background denotes a candidate elected from their party list. Yellow background denotes an electorate win by a list member, or other incumbent. A ✓ or ✗ denotes status of any incumbent, win or lose respectively.						
Party	Candidate	Votes	%	±%	Party votes	%	±%
Labour	✓ Jim Sutton	16,316	52.68		13,950	44.56	
National	Wayne Marriott	9,863	31.84		7,550	24.12	
Green	David Musgrave	1,327	4.28		1,613	5.15	
United Future	Tony Bunting	1,176	3.80		1,879	6.00	
Christian Heritage	McGregor Simpson	616	1.99		387	1.24	
ACT	Kevin Murray	579	1.87		1,377	4.40	
Legalise Cannabis	Christine Mitchell	453	1.46		264	0.84	
Progressive	Lynley Simmons	446	1.44		643	2.05	
Alliance	Andrew Buchanan	197	0.64		337	1.08	
NZ First					2,758	8.81	
ORNZ					521	1.66	
Mana Māori					11	0.04	
One NZ					10	0.03	
NMP					8	0.03	
Informal votes		373			132		
Total valid votes		30,973			31,308		
Labour hold	Majority	6,453	20.61				

=== 1999 election ===
1999 general election: Aoraki
Notes:	Blue background denotes the winner of the electorate vote. Pink background denotes a candidate elected from their party list. Yellow background denotes an electorate win by a list member, or other incumbent. A ✓ or ✗ denotes status of any incumbent, win or lose respectively.						
Party	Candidate	Votes	%	±%	Party votes	%	±%
Labour	✓ Jim Sutton	17,415	51.48		14,413		
National	Wayne Marriott	10,276	30.38		10,393		
Alliance	Lynley Simmons	2,031	6.00		2,881		
Green	David Musgrave	1,061	3.14		1,505		
Christian Heritage	McGregor Simpson	1,023	3.02		953		
NZ First	Albert Gould	705	2.08		992		
Legalise Cannabis	Christine Mitchell	659	1.95		450		
ACT	Dean Richardson	657	1.94		1,694		
South Island					209		
Libertarianz					139		
United NZ					137		
Christian Democrats					115		
Animals First					66		
McGillicuddy Serious					35		
One NZ					17		
Natural Law					7		
People's Choice Party					5		
Mana Māori					4		
NMP					4		
Republican					3		
Freedom Movement					2		
Mauri Pacific					1		
Informal votes		511			313		
Total valid votes		33,827			34,025		
Labour hold	Majority	7,139					

=== 1996 election ===
1996 general election: Aoraki
Notes:	Blue background denotes the winner of the electorate vote. Pink background denotes a candidate elected from their party list. Yellow background denotes an electorate win by a list member, or other incumbent. A ✓ or ✗ denotes status of any incumbent, win or lose respectively.						
Party	Candidate	Votes	%	±%	Party votes	%	±%
Labour	✓ Jim Sutton	13,538	41.02		10,088	30.41	
National	Stuart Boag	10,606	32.14		10,861	32.75	
NZ First	Jenny Bloxham	4,595	13.92		3,802	11.46	
Alliance	Rex Verity	3,021	9.15		4,491	13.54	
Christian Coalition	Robin Donovan	635	1.92		1,211	3.65	
ACT	Alan Cone	531	1.61		1,677	5.06	
Natural Law	Royal van der Werf	75	0.23		25	0.08	
Legalise Cannabis					615	1.85	
United NZ					184	0.55	
McGillicuddy Serious					85	0.26	
Animals First					42	0.13	
Progressive Green					40	0.12	
Green Society					17	0.05	
Superannuitants & Youth					12	0.04	
Advance New Zealand					6	0.02	
Conservatives					6	0.02	
Ethnic Minority Party					3	0.01	
Mana Māori					2	0.01	
Libertarianz					1	0.00	
Asia Pacific United					0	0.00	
Te Tawharau					0	0.00	
Informal votes		288			121		
Total valid votes		33,001			33,168		
Labour win new seat	Majority	2,932	8.84				
