= Jo Goodhew =

New Zealand politician (born 1961)

The Honourable Jo Goodhew
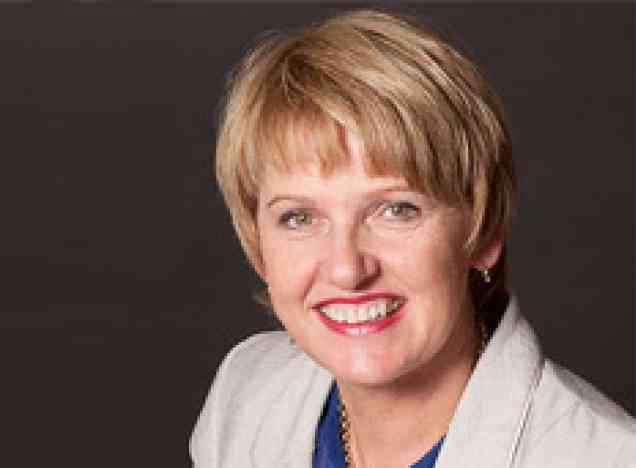

Member of the New Zealand Parliament for Rangitata
- In office 2008–2017
- Succeeded by: Andrew Falloon

6th Minister for the Community and Voluntary Sector
- In office 12 December 2011 – 20 December 2016
- Prime Minister: John Key; Bill English
- Preceded by: Tariana Turia
- Succeeded by: Alfred Ngaro

Junior Government Whip
- In office 15 June 2009 – 12 December 2011
- Preceded by: Chris Tremain
- Succeeded by: Louise Upston

Member of the New Zealand Parliament for Aoraki
- In office 2005–2008
- Preceded by: Jim Sutton
- Succeeded by: Electorate abolished
- Majority: 6,937

Personal details
- Born: 1961 (age 64–65) Temuka, New Zealand
- Party: National
- Profession: Nurse

Joanne Gay Goodhew (born 1961) is a New Zealand politician. She served as a member of Parliament between 2005 and 2017.

== Early years ==
Goodhew grew up in Timaru, and attended Timaru Girls' High School. She holds a qualification in nursing from Otago Polytechnic and had a career in nursing before working as health sciences tutor at Aoraki Polytechnic. Before entering politics she was involved in a variety of health organisations in the Otago region.

== Member of Parliament ==
New Zealand Parliament
Years	Term	Electorate	List	Party
2005–2008	48th	Aoraki	31	National
2008–2011	49th	Rangitata	39	National
2011–2014	50th	Rangitata	23	National
2014–2017	51st	Rangitata	21	National

In the 2005 election, Goodhew was a candidate for the National Party, standing in the Aoraki electorate and being ranked 31st on the party list. She won the Aoraki seat and entered Parliament.

In the 2008 election, most of Aoraki was moved to the new Rangitata electorate. It was suggested that this could make the electorate vulnerable to capture by Labour; however, Goodhew won the new electorate with an increased majority.

Goodhew was elected National Party junior whip in 2009, after Internal Affairs minister Richard Worth resigned and was replaced by senior whip Nathan Guy (who was in turn replaced by junior whip Chris Tremain).

Goodhew was returned as MP for Rangitata at the 2011 general election, though with a slightly reduced majority. Goodhew was additionally made a minister outside of Cabinet, holding the Community and Voluntary Sector, Senior Citizens and Women's Affairs portfolios.

In the 2014 election, Goodhew more than doubled her majority over Labour's Steve Gibson. She was reappointed as a minister, retaining the Community and Voluntary Sector portfolio and additionally becoming Minister for Food Safety and an associate minister with responsibility for social development and primary industries.

On 20 December 2016, Goodhew lost her ministerial portfolios in a reshuffle after the resignation of Prime Minister John Key. Although she had originally signalled her intention to recontest the Rangitata electorate, she announced on 25 January 2017 she would retire at the 2017 election. She was succeeded as National's candidate and Rangitata MP by Andrew Falloon.

== Later career ==
After leaving Parliament, Goodhew contested and was elected to the South Canterbury District Health Board in the 2019 local elections.

New Zealand Parliament
Preceded by Jim Sutton	Member of Parliament for Aoraki; 2005–2008	Constituency abolished
New constituency	Member of Parliament for Rangitata; 2008–2017	Succeeded by Andrew Falloon
Political offices
Preceded by Craig Foss	Minister for Senior Citizens; 2013–2014	Succeeded by Maggie Barry
Preceded by Chris Tremain	Junior Government Whip; 2009–2011	Succeeded by Louise Upston
