= Minister for Youth (New Zealand) =

New Zealand minister of the Crown

- Coat of Arms of New Zealand

- Flag of New Zealand

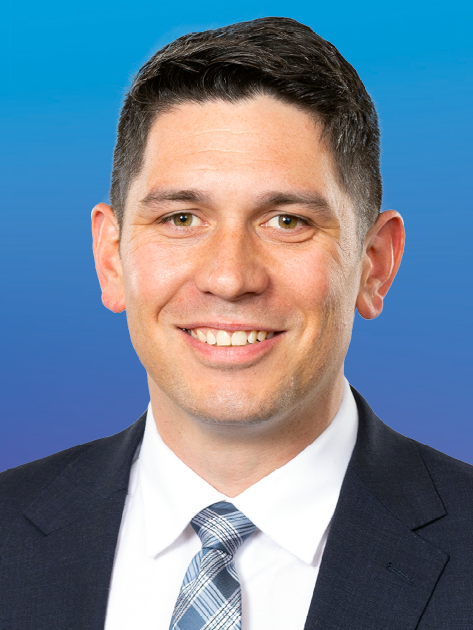
- Incumbent; James Meager since 24 January 2025
- Ministry of Social Development and Employment
- Style: The Honourable
- Member of: Cabinet of New Zealand; Executive Council
- Reports to: Prime Minister of New Zealand
- Appointer: Governor-General of New Zealand
- Term length: At His Majesty's pleasure
- Inaugural holder: Phil Goff
- Formation: 24 August 1987
- Salary: $288,900
- Website: www.beehive.govt.nz

The Minister for Youth is a minister in the New Zealand Government with responsibility for the rights and interests of young people. The Minister has oversight over the Ministry of Youth Development.

The post was established by the Fourth Labour Government on 24 August 1987. It was split from the Social Welfare portfolio.

== History ==
The following ministers have held the office of Minister for Youth.

Key

Labour National NZ First Alliance

No.	Name	Portrait	Term of Office		Prime Minister
1	Phil Goff		24 August 1987	14 August 1989	Lange
2	Annette King		14 August 1989	2 November 1990	Palmer
2	Annette King		14 August 1989	2 November 1990	Moore
3	Roger McClay		2 November 1990	8 November 1996	Bolger
4	Katherine O'Regan		8 November 1996	18 December 1996	Bolger
5	Deborah Morris		18 December 1996	31 August 1998	Bolger
5	Deborah Morris		18 December 1996	31 August 1998	Shipley
6	Tony Ryall		31 August 1998	10 December 1999	Shipley
7	Laila Harré		10 December 1999	15 August 2002	Clark
8	John Tamihere		15 August 2002	15 October 2004	Clark
9	Rick Barker		3 November 2004	21 December 2004	Clark
10	Steve Maharey		21 December 2004	19 October 2005	Clark
11	Nanaia Mahuta		19 October 2005	19 November 2008	Clark
12	Paula Bennett		19 November 2008	30 January 2013	Key
13	Nikki Kaye		31 January 2013	26 October 2017	Key
13	Nikki Kaye		31 January 2013	26 October 2017	English
14	Peeni Henare		26 October 2017	6 November 2020	Ardern
15	Priyanca Radhakrishnan		6 November 2020	1 February 2023	Ardern
15	Priyanca Radhakrishnan		6 November 2020	1 February 2023	Hipkins
16	Willow-Jean Prime		1 February 2023	27 November 2023	Hipkins
17	Matt Doocey		27 November 2023	24 January 2025	Luxon
18	James Meager		24 January 2025	present	Luxon
