= Robyn Hughes =

New Zealand politician

Robyn Hughes is a politician from Auckland, New Zealand. She represented Manukau City on the Auckland Regional Council between 1904 and 2007. In the 2007 Auckland local body elections she failed to gain re-election, winning only three votes.

She is a member of the left-wing Residents Action Movement, which advocates free and frequent public transport within the Auckland region as a solution to both climate change and the city's gridlock.
