= Jim Sutton =

New Zealand politician

The Honourable Jim Sutton CNZM
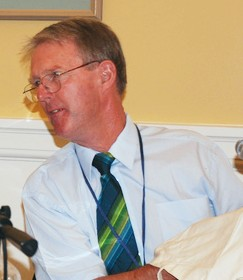
- Sutton in 2007

Minister of Agriculture
- In office 9 February 1990 – 2 November 1990
- Prime Minister: Geoffrey Palmer; Mike Moore
- In office 10 December 1999 – 19 October 2005
- Prime Minister: Helen Clark

Member of the New Zealand Parliament for Waitaki
- In office 14 July 1984 – 27 October 1990
- Preceded by: Jonathan Elworthy
- Succeeded by: Alec Neill

Member of the New Zealand Parliament for Timaru
- In office 6 November 1993 – 12 October 1996
- Preceded by: Maurice McTigue
- Succeeded by: Constituency abolished

Member of the New Zealand Parliament for Aoraki
- In office 12 October 1996 – 17 September 2005
- Preceded by: Constituency established
- Succeeded by: Jo Goodhew

Member of the New Zealand Parliament for Labour Party list
- In office 17 September 2005 – 30 July 2006
- Succeeded by: Charles Chauvel (Note: Normally, list MPs do not have individual predecessors or successors, but Sutton resigned during a sitting parliament and therefore was succeeded by Chauvel.)

Personal details
- Born: 7 November 1941 (age 85) Reading, Berkshire, England
- Party: Labour

James Robert Sutton CNZM (born 7 November 1941), generally known as Jim Sutton, is a New Zealand politician who was a Member of Parliament between 1984 and 1990 and again between 1993 and 2006. He has held a range of ministerial portfolios including Agriculture, Forestry, Rural Affairs, Biosecurity, and Trade Negotiations.

== Biography ==
Sutton was born in Reading, Berkshire, England. He came to New Zealand while young, arriving in 1949. He attended Timaru Boys' High School before becoming a farmer. Sutton is married, and has three children.

He has held a number of offices in Federated Farmers, a nationwide agricultural association. He was also Director of Trustbank South Canterbury, chaired the New Zealand Aids Foundation, served as a board member of the Public Health Commission, and was deputy chair of both the New Zealand Lotteries Commission and Meridian Energy. His brother Bill Sutton has also been a Labour MP.

== Honours and awards ==
Sutton was appointed as a Companion of the New Zealand Order of Merit in the New Year Honours List 2007 for public services as a member of parliament and Minister of the Crown.

== Member of Parliament ==
New Zealand Parliament
Years	Term	Electorate	List	Party
1984–1987	41st	Waitaki		Labour
1987–1990	42nd	Waitaki		Labour
1993–1996	44th	Timaru		Labour
1996–1999	45th	Aoraki	18	Labour
1999–2002	46th	Aoraki	11	Labour
2002–2005	47th	Aoraki	8	Labour
2005–2006	48th	List	11	Labour

Sutton first stood for parliament in the election of 1981, becoming the Labour Party's candidate for the Waitaki electorate. He was unsuccessful against National's Jonathan Elworthy. In the 1984 election, however, he stood again, and won the electorate. Most rural electorates in New Zealand traditionally support the National Party, and so Sutton's victory as a Labour candidate was noteworthy.

Sutton retained his electorate in the 1987 general election, but was defeated in the election of 1990. He returned to farming for three years before being returned to Parliament as the MP for Timaru in the 1993 general election. The switch to the MMP electoral system caused significant redistribution of electorates for the 1996 general election, and Sutton became the MP for Aoraki, which included both of his former electorates.

=== Ministerial role ===
Sutton's first ministerial role had come in the dying days of the Fourth Labour Government, shortly before he lost the Waitaki electorate. He served as Minister of Agriculture and Minister of Forestry for most of 1990, leaving cabinet when Labour was defeated in that year's election. However, when Labour won the 1999 general election, Sutton became a minister once again in the Fifth Labour Government. He resumed his Agriculture portfolio while also becoming Minister for Rural Affairs and Minister for Trade Negotiations. In 2001, he gained the Biosecurity portfolio, and in 2002, he regained the Forestry portfolio. In the December 2004 cabinet reshuffle he dropped the Forestry portfolio and for Rural Affairs became Associate Minister.

=== Retirement from politics ===
In the 2005 general election, Sutton lost his electorate by a substantial margin, facing the biggest drop in support in any electorate. This has been attributed to anger over things such as school closures, and his role in the "speeding motorcade" affair. He remained in parliament as a list MP, but announced his retirement from politics on 10 July 2006, effective from 1 August 2006. He was replaced from the Labour list by Charles Chauvel.

Sutton subsequently became Ambassador for Trade and the chairman of Landcorp, an appointment renewed by the National government in 2009.

== Notes ==
New Zealand Parliament
Preceded by Jonathan Elworthy	Member of Parliament for Waitaki; 1984–1990	Succeeded by Alec Neill
Preceded by Maurice McTigue	Member of Parliament for Timaru; 1993–1996	Constituency abolished
New constituency	Member of Parliament for Aoraki; 1996–2005	Succeeded by Jo Goodhew
