= New Zealand Family Rights Protection Party =

Political party

New Zealand Family Rights Protection Party logo

The New Zealand Family Rights Protection Party was a political party in New Zealand. Membership were primarily Pasifika New Zealanders, on a platform that the established political parties did not give sufficient consideration to the concerns of Pacific Islanders in New Zealand.

The party was approved for official registration on 7 March 2005. It contested the 2005 elections and garnered 0.05% of the vote, with the aim of a more serious attempt in the 2008 elections. It was reported to have reached an informal agreement with the Māori Party not to compete against each other. The Labour Party, which has traditionally received substantial support from Pacific Islanders, dismissed the new party's chances.

In 2007, the party requested and received deregistration.
