= Residents Action Movement =

- Leader: Oliver Woods and Grant Brookes
- President: Grant Morgan
- Founded: 2003
- Dissolved: May 2010
- Ideology: Democratic socialism
- Colours: Sky blue, white

The Residents Action Movement (or RAM) was a political party in New Zealand. RAM described itself as "a mass membership, broad left, grassroots movement of social change". Its national chair was Grant Morgan and its co-leaders were Oliver Woods and Grant Brookes.

== History ==
=== Foundation ===
RAM was formed in 2003 out of dissatisfaction by Auckland community activists with the control of local body politics by centre-left Labour-supported City Vision and centre-right National-supported Citizens and Ratepayers.

RAM ran eight candidates for Auckland Regional Council in the 2004 local body elections and polled over 87,000 votes. One candidate, Robyn Hughes, was elected to the regional council.

=== 2007 Auckland local elections ===
RAM expanded its activities in the 2007 Auckland local body elections, running seven candidates for the Auckland Regional Council and six for Auckland City Council, as well as candidates for Auckland's three District Health Boards and Auckland City community boards. Despite receiving more than 117,016 votes Auckland wide, no RAM candidates were elected. In the Auckland Regional Council elections, its vote decreased, from 87,000 to 76,000. Across the board, the right made gains in Greater Auckland's 2007 council elections at the expense of both the centre-left (Labour-aligned tickets) and the left (RAM).

=== 2008 parliamentary election ===
In early 2008, RAM began to actively recruit to meet the 500 party member threshold required by the Electoral Commission for party registration. Later in the year, it achieved more than 2,000 registered members, to contest the 2008 general election. It applied for a broadcasting allocation.

The party was registered by the Electoral Commission on 29 July 2008.

RAM received 465 party votes in the 2008 Parliamentary elections, coming second-to-last.

== Policies ==
RAM advocated a policy of free and frequent public transport, with the aims of alleviating traffic congestion, allowing improved transport means for Auckland residents and fighting against climate change. The other core messages of RAM were reducing rates on homeowners, shifting local taxation onto big business, and removing goods and services tax from food. The organisation had a very strong policy of anti-racism and particularly of supporting Muslim migrants to integrate into New Zealand society. It also called for an "Auckland Parliament" to co-ordinate local democracy in Auckland's five local cities, as an alternative to what it sees as an undemocratic "Super-City" body.

In 2007, RAM also organised against racism and Islamophobia in the city and sponsored a peace march in Auckland with Global Peace and Justice Auckland.

== Demise ==
In May 2010, the party was deregistered by the Electoral Commission at its own request. According to RAM member Curwen Rolinson, members went to different parties such as Labour or the Greens. Rolinson himself became a key figure in the early years of Young New Zealand First.

== See also ==
Category:Residents Action Movement politicians
