= James Meager =

New Zealand politician

The Honourable James Meager MP
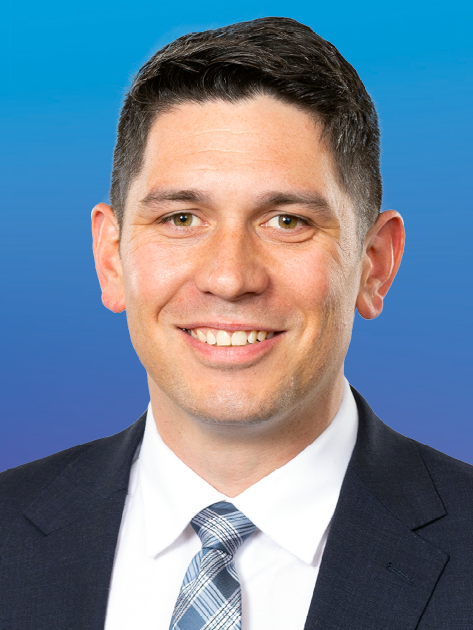
- Meager in 2023

18th Minister for Youth
- Incumbent
- Assumed office 24 January 2025
- Prime Minister: Christopher Luxon
- Preceded by: Matt Doocey

Member of the New Zealand Parliament for Rangitata
- Incumbent
- Assumed office 14 October 2023
- Preceded by: Jo Luxton

Personal details
- Born: James Rawiri Meager; 1986 or 1987 (age 39–40) Timaru, New Zealand
- Party: National
- Education: University of Otago

James Rawiri Meager (born 1986 or 1987) is a New Zealand politician and Member of Parliament in the House of Representatives for the National Party in the electorate of Rangitata.

== Early life and career ==
Born in Timaru in 1986 or 1987, Meager is of Ngāi Tahu descent. He grew up in Timaru, where he lived in state housing. Meager attended Timaru Boys' High School, where he was head boy and dux. He gained Bachelor of Laws and Bachelor of Arts degrees from the University of Otago, although he had originally intended to become a doctor. He describes himself at university as "loud-mouthed, obnoxious and opinionated". After an incident where he threw a drink over another student, frying his laptop, he ascribed his bad behaviour partly to alcohol use. While at university, Meager helped on National Party list MP Michael Woodhouse's 2011 campaign, and went on to run the 2014 campaign. Prior to being elected to Parliament, Meager worked as a senior solicitor for Simpson Grierson, and ran a consultancy firm. He has also worked as a press secretary to Paula Bennett, as a staffer for Chris Bishop's parliamentary office, and an advisor to Bill English and Simon Bridges.

== Political career ==
New Zealand Parliament
Years	Term	Electorate	List	Party
2023–2026	54th	Rangitata	69	National
2026–Present	55th	Rangitata	17	National

Meager was selected as National's candidate for the formerly safe seat of Rangitata on 18 September 2022. It was a close contest with one other competitor vying for the nomination.

On election night, Meager received 22,792 votes, beating incumbent Labour Party MP Jo Luxton by 10,846 votes. Meager said his first priority as a member of parliament would be to ensure the building of a second bridge for Ashburton happened according to the planned timeframes. The bridge was announced by the Labour government in August 2023, with construction due to start in 2024 and take two years. Meager was concerned that timeframes might change, but promised to begin construction in the first parliamentary term.

Perhaps to some I am a walking contradiction—you know, a part-Māori boy, raised in a State house by a single parent on the benefit, now a proud National Party MP in a deeply rural farming electorate in the middle of the South Island—but there is no contradiction there. Members opposite do not own Māori. Members opposite do not own the poor. Members opposite do not own the workers. No party and no ideology has a right to claim ownership over anything or anyone.

— Excerpt from Meager's maiden speech at the Address in Reply, 6 December 2023

Meager was selected to give the National Party's first speech in the 54th Parliament's Address in Reply as his maiden speech. His contribution, which discussed his upbringing as a "part Māori boy raised in a state house by a single parent on the benefit" and the "walking contradiction" of that boy becoming a National Party MP received a standing ovation from both sides of the House and was praised by commentators, who described Meager as "assured and confident" and a possible future prime minister.

In the January 2025 Cabinet reshuffle, Meager was promoted to a Minister outside Cabinet as the Minister for Youth, Minister for Hunting and Fishing, Minister for the South Island and an Associate Minister of Transport. He was the first National MP who was elected in 2023 to be appointed a ministerial portfolio.

During the 2026 New Zealand general election, Meager contested the Rangitata electorate for National. He was ranked 17th on the National Party list. On 7 November, Meager retained Rangitata by a landslide margin of 13,917 votes.

New Zealand Parliament
Preceded by Jo Luxton	Member of Parliament for Rangitata; 2023–present	Incumbent
