= List of political parties in New Zealand =

New Zealand politics have featured a strong party system since the early 20th century. Usually, all members of Parliament's unicameral House of Representatives belong to a political party. (Note: Independent (non-partisan) candidates are seldom elected, though MPs may serve as independents after leaving or being expelled from their party.)

The first major political party in New Zealand was the Liberal Party. The centre-left Labour Party and centre-right National Party are the country's two major parties, having jointly contested each election since 1938; they are the only political parties to have won the popular vote in four consecutive elections twice.

The introduction of the mixed-member proportional system in 1996 led to a multi-party system, such that smaller parties have substantial representation in Parliament and can now reasonably expect to gain seats in government. As of 2024, six parties have members in the 54th Parliament.

== History ==
New Zealand's party system did not arise until the late 19th century. Before this, members of Parliament (MPs) stood as independent candidates, and while some MPs joined factions, these typically were formed around prominent individuals such as Julius Vogel, and did so after an election, not before.

The Liberal Party, which was formed in 1891, was New Zealand's first 'modern' political party. It was the country's sole political party until the formation of the more conservative Reform Party in 1909. The Labour Party was founded in 1916, and by 1919 these three parties dominated New Zealand politics.

The Liberal Party was succeeded by the United Party in 1928. The United and Reform parties found themselves working together more often, and they formed a coalition in 1931. After Labour won office in 1935, United and Reform formally amalgamated in 1936 to form the National Party. The first-past-the-post (FPP) plurality voting system (in use before the 1990s) entrenched a two-party system, since the two major parties usually won far more seats than their share of the overall vote.

Over the years, a number of third parties or so-called minor parties developed, notably the Social Credit Party, the New Zealand Party, the Values Party, and the Alliance. However, the FPP electoral system meant that regardless of how many votes a party gained nationwide, it could not win a seat without a plurality in a particular electorate. For example, the Social Credit Party won over 11% of the votes cast in the 1954 election but did not have a plurality in any electorate so won no seats. Similarly, in the 1984 election, the New Zealand Party received over 12% of the votes cast but also won no seats. Under such conditions, minor parties mostly performed poorly in terms of making an impact in Parliament.

In 1993, the Electoral Act 1993 was passed, introducing the mixed-member proportional (MMP) electoral system for the 1996 election. Now, voters cast both a party vote and an electorate vote. Any party that won at least 5% of the party vote entered Parliament, and candidates could still enter through the previous electorate pathway. This made it much easier for smaller parties to enter Parliament, but more difficult to gain elected as a non-party independent.

In the late 1990s a trend originated in New Zealand's multi-party system in which MPs sitting in Parliament increasingly switched parties (or formed breakway parties), known as "waka-jumping". This is now disallowed to maintain the integrity of the party-based proportional representation.

== Registration of parties ==
Political parties in New Zealand can be either registered or unregistered. (Note: Registered with the New Zealand Electoral Commission) Registered parties must have five hundred paying members, each eligible to vote in general elections, and party membership rules.

If a party registers, it may submit a party list, enabling it to receive party votes in New Zealand's MMP electoral system. Unregistered parties can only nominate candidates for individual electorates.

As of 2020, registered political parties are also entitled to spend up to $1,169,000 during the campaign for the party vote and $27,500 per electorate seat. Unregistered entities are entitled to spend up to $330,000 on general election advertising.

== Current parties ==
=== Parties represented in Parliament ===
There are six parliamentary parties in the 54th New Zealand Parliament. The default order of this list corresponds to the number of MPs they currently have.

| Party | Leader(s) | Founded | Represented | Position | Ideology | Seats |
|---|---|---|---|---|---|---|
| National Party | Christopher Luxon | 1936 | 1936–present | Centre-right | Conservatism; Liberalism | 49 / 123 |
| Labour Party | Chris Hipkins | 1916 | 1916–present | Centre-left | Social democracy | 34 / 123 |
| Green Party | Marama Davidson; Chlöe Swarbrick | 1990 | 1997–present | Centre-left to left-wing | Green politics; Social democracy | 15 / 123 |
| ACT | David Seymour | 1994 | 1996–present | Right-wing | Classical liberalism; Conservatism; Right-libertarianism | 11 / 123 |
| New Zealand First | Winston Peters | 1993 | 1993–2008; 2011–2020; 2023–present | Right-wing | Right-wing populism Nationalism Social conservatism | 8 / 123 |
| Te Pāti Māori | Rawiri Waititi; Debbie Ngarewa-Packer | 2004 | 2004–2017; 2020–present | Left-wing | Māori rights Tino rangatiratanga | 6 / 123 |

=== Registered parties outside Parliament ===
Parties listed in alphabetical order:

| Party | Leader(s) | Founded | Position | Ideology |
|---|---|---|---|---|
| Alliance | Victor Billot | 1991 | Left-wing | Democratic socialism |
| Animal Justice Party | Robert McNeil and Dannette Wereta | 2022 | Single issue | Animal rights |
| Aotearoa Legalise Cannabis Party | Maki Herbert and Michael Appleby | 1996 | Single issue | Cannabis legalisation |
| Conservative Party NZ | Helen Houghton | 2011 | Right-wing | Conservatism, social conservatism, right-wing populism |
| Free Palestine | Paul Hopkinson | 2026 | Single issue | Anti-Zionism, Palestinian independence |
| New Zealand Loyal | Liz Gunn / Kelvyn Alp (disputed) | 2023 | Far-right | Conspiracism |
| NZ Outdoors & Freedom Party | Sue Grey | 2015 | Syncretic | Anti-vaccination, anti-lockdown, environmentalism |
| Te Tai Tokerau Party | Mariameno Kapa-Kingi | 2026 | | Tino rangatiratanga |
| The Opportunity Party | Qiulae Wong | 2016 | Radical centre | Radical centrism |
| Vision NZ | Hannah Tamaki | 2019 | Far-right | Christian nationalism, right-wing populism |
| Women's Rights Party | Jill Ovens and Dawn Trenberth | 2023 | Single issue | Anti-transgender sentiment |

=== Unregistered parties ===
An accurate list of active unregistered parties can be difficult to determine. Any person may announce a political party, but these parties may or may not gain followers, receive any media coverage or go on to contest an election. It can also be difficult to determine when parties have ceased operating or moved away from politics.

The list below lists active and notable parties.

| Party | Leader(s) | Founded | Position | Ideology |
|---|---|---|---|---|
| Money Free Party | Richard Osmaston | 2014 | | Money Free movement |
| NewZeal | Vacant | 2020 | Right-wing | Christian fundamentalism, social conservatism |
| Not A Party | Bob Wessex | 2015? (Note: The earliest post on the party's website dates back to 2015.) | | Anti-voting |
| Progressive Party of Aotearoa New Zealand | Bruce Dyer | 2020 | Syncretic | Progressive utilization theory |

When a candidate stands for parliament in an electorate, they may describe themselves as 'independent' or give a party name. A candidate listing a party name is not necessarily an indication that the party exists beyond that single candidate. In the 2026 general election, single candidates are standing under the party names of Balance New Zealand, Build the Nation, Economic Euthenics, Independent Taranaki, the Jobseeker Party, the New World Order McCann Party, the Socialist Equality Group, Te Pāti Hira, and Your PIC Party. Two candidates are standing under the People's Party New Zealand.

== Historical parties ==
=== Parties that held seats ===
| Party | Founded | Disbanded | In Parliament | Description |
|---|---|---|---|---|
| Liberal Party | 1891 | 1927 | 1891–1927 | New Zealand's first political party. It provided the country with a number of prominent Prime Ministers, including John Ballance and Richard Seddon. With much of its traditional support undercut by the growing Labour Party, the remnants of the Liberals (known as the United Party) eventually merged with the Reform Party to form the modern National Party. |
| New Liberal Party | 1905 | 1908 | 1905–1908 | A party formed by Liberal Party dissidents. Its members were opposed to Liberal leader, Richard Seddon, seeing him as an autocrat. The party proposed a more "progressive" policy seeing the current Liberal policy as too cautious and orthodox. The New Liberals lost much support after the infamous "voucher incident", leaving them discredited. |
| Independent Political Labour League | 1905 | 1910 | 1908–1910 | A small and short-lived left-wing party. It was the third organised party to win a seat in Parliament, with David McLaren winning the seat of Wellington East. In Parliament, the IPLL co-operated with the governing Liberal Party. |
| Reform Party | 1909 | 1936 | 1909–1936 | New Zealand's second major political party, established as a more conservative opponent to the Liberal Party. Its founder, William Massey, became its most prominent leader. It eventually merged with one of its former rivals, United, to form the modern National Party. |
| Labour Party (original) | 1910 | 1912 | 1910–1912 | A short-lived successor to the Independent Political Labour League. It functioned as one of the more moderate workers' parties, opposing more radical groups like the Socialist Party. It should not be confused with the modern Labour Party, although a certain degree of continuity links the two. |
| United Labour Party | 1912 | 1916 | 1912–1916 | A reformed continuation of the original Labour Party. The party existed only a short time before merging with the Socialist Party to form the Social Democratic Party, although a faction rejected the new SDP as too extreme and continued on under the United Labour Party banner eventually likewise merging in 1916. |
| Social Democratic Party | 1913 | 1922 | 1913–1916 | An early left-wing party established at a "Unity Congress" in July 1913 as an attempt to bring together the various labour groups of the time. The party eventually amalgamated with the modern Labour Party. |
| Country Party | 1922 | 1938 | 1928–1938 | A party established by members of the Farmers' Union to promote the interests of the rural sector. It reflected to an extent social credit monetary theory, and believed that farmers were not treated fairly by banks and the corporate world. |
| United Party | 1927 | 1936 | 1927–1936 | A party formed from the remnants of the Liberal Party. United governed between 1928 and 1935, initially with Labour support and later in coalition with the Reform Party. It eventually merged with Reform to establish the modern National Party. |
| Democratic Labour Party | 1940 | 1949 | 1940–1943 | A splinter from the Labour Party led by dissident MP John A. Lee. Lee, a socialist and social creditist, believed that the Labour Party had moved too far from its left-wing roots. The Labour Party hierarchy had expelled him after he repeatedly criticised its leadership. |
| Social Credit Party | 1953 | 2023 | 1954–1987 | The New Zealand Social Credit Party (sometimes called "Socred") was a political party that was New Zealand's third party from the 1950s to the 1980s. It was elected to the New Zealand House of Representatives, holding one seat at times between 1966 and 1981, and two seats from 1981 to 1987. |
| NewLabour Party | 1989 | 2000 | 1989–1991 | A left-wing party established by former Labour MP Jim Anderton. It contested one election before joining with several other parties to establish the Alliance. |
| Christian Heritage NZ | 1990 | 2006 | 1999 | A party that advocates Christian conservative values. It supported policies to strengthen marriage and opposed abortion and same-sex unions. |
| Liberal Party | 1991 | 1998 | 1991-1992 | A short-lived splinter from the National Party, formed by Hamish McIntyre and Gilbert Myles, two dissident National MPs who disagreed with the economic policies of Ruth Richardson. The Liberal Party quickly joined the Alliance, which the two saw as the principal opponent of Richardson and her ideological allies. |
| New Zealand Conservative Party | 1994 | 1996 | 1994–1996 | Initially called the Right of Centre Party, it was founded by breakaway National MP, Ross Meurant. After the general election of 1996, the remnants of the party amalgamated with the United Party. |
| Future New Zealand | 1994 | 1995 | 1994–1995 | A short-lived party established by Peter Dunne after he left the Labour Party. It integrated into the United New Zealand party. Not to be confused with a later party of the same name. |
| Christian Democrats | 1995 | 1998 | 1995–1996 | A Christian party established by sitting National MP Graeme Lee. After briefly establishing the Christian Coalition (see above) with the Christian Heritage Party, the Christian Democrats secularised themselves, adopting the name "Future New Zealand". Future New Zealand merged with United (see below) to form United Future New Zealand. |
| United New Zealand | 1995 | 2000 | 1995–2000 | A centrist party established by moderate MPs from both National and Labour. The party did not achieve electoral success, with only one of the seven founding MPs managing to remain in Parliament. United later merged with the Future New Zealand party to form the modern United Future New Zealand. |
| Mana Wahine Te Ira Tangata | 1998 | 2001 | 1998–1999 | A short-lived Māori feminist party established by Alliance (Mana Motuhake) defector Alamein Kopu. The party contested only one general election before vanishing. |
| Mauri Pacific | 1999 | 2001 | 1999 | A party established by several New Zealand First MPs shortly after a coalition between New Zealand First and the National Party broke down. Mauri Pacific remained allied to the National government, giving it crucial support, but none of the party's MPs gained re-election in the 1999 election. |
| United Future | 2000 | 2017 | 2000–2017 | A centrist party, originally with a strong Christian background: it described its platform as "common sense". It had a particular focus on policies concerning the family and social issues. |
| Progressive Party | 2002 | 2012 | 2002–2011 | A left-wing party with a focus on job creation and regional development, formed by Jim Anderton after his split from the Alliance. |
| Pacific Party | 2008 | 2010 | 2008 | A small party established by Taito Phillip Field aimed at advancing Pacific Peoples, as well as Christian and family values and social justice. |
| Mana Movement | 2011 | 2021 | 2011–2014 | A Māori rights party formed in 2011 by Hone Harawira after he resigned from the Māori Party. |
| NZ Independent Coalition | 2014 | 2016 | 2012–2014 | A party emphasising local electorate representation, formed by MP Brendan Horan who became independent from New Zealand First in 2012. |

=== Parties that never held seats ===
Because New Zealand does not require political parties to be registered, any person can announce a political party, though it may not receive media coverage or contest an election. It can also be difficult to determine when such parties have ceased operating or moved away from politics. The list below is limited to notable parties understood to be no longer operating.

Parties listed by date of founding
| Party | Founded | Disbanded | Description |
|---|---|---|---|
| Socialist Party | 1901 | 1913 | One of the more prominent Marxist parties in early New Zealand, strongly associated with the Federation of Labour (the "Red Fed"). It eventually merged with the more moderate United Labour Party to form the Social Democratic Party. |
| Communist Party | 1929 | 1994 | Probably New Zealand's most prominent and long-lived communist organisation. The party generally pursued hard-line doctrines, successively following Stalin's Soviet Union, Mao Zedong's China, and Enver Hoxha's Albania. In 1993, the party moderated its stance, adopting Trotskyism. It later merged with another party to form the group known as Socialist Worker. |
| New Zealand Legion | 1930 | 1934? | A short-lived crypto-fascist political movement advocating conservative political reform and opposition to party politics and state bureaucracy. It was associated with John Ormond and later Robert Campbell Begg and did not see itself as a political party. |
| World Socialist Party | 1930 | 1996 | A party established by former members of the New Zealand Marxian Association, a Marxist group. Its founders created it as an alternative to the mainstream labour movement, claiming that the Labour Party had moved too far from its left-wing roots. The World Socialist Party was rebranded from its founding name; the Socialist Party. |
| Democrat Party | 1934 | 1936 | A party established to promote the interests of the commercial sector and to oppose "socialist" legislation. The party contested the 1935 election, but failed to win any seats. Ironically, the votes which the Democrats took from the governing coalition may have assisted the victory of the left-wing Labour Party that year. The Democrat Party should not be confused with the modern Democratic Party. |
| Liberal Party | c. 1938 | c. 1949 | A centrist anti-socialist liberal party formed ahead of the 1938 election but withdrew its candidates. Mostly inactive during World War II, it was briefly revived in the late 1940s. |
| People's Movement | 1940 | ? | A right-wing organisation which supported reductions in the size of government and a reform of the party system. It was a strong supporter of individualism, saying that the government of the time was advocating the subordination of the individual to the state. |
| Real Democracy Movement | 1942 | ? | A Social Credit theory based party which advocated economic security combined with individual liberty. It also advocated that all returned servicemen should be paid the average wage until they were re-integrated into civil employment. |
| Co-operative Party | 1942 | 1943? | A short-lived party established by Albert Davy, a prominent anti-socialist political organiser. It was primarily a breakaway from the larger People's Movement, and Davy rejoined the Movement the year after the Co-operative Party was established. |
| New Zealand Liberal Federation | 1956 | 1958? | A party formed by ex-National and Social Credit candidates who wished to revive "Seddon liberalism" via a third party. |
| Liberal Party | 1962 | ? | A party which campaigned in the 1963 election on a platform of reducing the size of the government, introducing a written constitution, and restoring the upper house of Parliament. |
| Democratic Progress Party | 1966 | c. 1968 | Founded as the Democratic Party ahead of the 1966 election, the party was centrist with policies emphasizing individual freedoms. In 1967 the Progress Party was formed but merged with the Democratic Party one week later becoming known as the Democratic Progress Party. |
| Socialist Unity Party | 1966 | ? | A splinter group of the Communist Party (see above). It was formed by Communist Party members who rejected their party's decision to take China's side in the Sino-Soviet split. The Socialist Unity Party became one of the more prominent communist parties in New Zealand. |
| Republican Party | 1967 | 1974 | A party established to promote the creation of a New Zealand Republic. It was founded by left-wing activist Bruce Jesson, and was the product of the Republican Association, an anti-royal protest group founded by Jesson in 1966. |
| National Front | 1968 | ? | A far-right, ultranationalist and white nationalist organisation. It acted as a political party around the 2000s. |
| Liberal Reform Party | 1968 | 1972? | A party initially launched as a revival of the decades earlier Country Party by the New Zealand Free Enterprise Movement in 1968 it was renamed the Liberal Reform Party in 1970 after failure at the 1969 election and contested the 1972 election under this name. |
| National Socialist Party | 1969 | ? | A party founded by prominent far-right activist Colin King-Ansell. It is sometimes considered the first noteworthy far-right party in New Zealand. |
| Communist League | 1969 | ? | Communism, Marxism–Leninism |
| Values Party | 1972 | 1990 | Sometimes called the world's first national-level green party. Elements of the Values Party eventually contributed to the formation of the modern Green Party of Aotearoa New Zealand. |
| New Democratic Party | 1972 | 1973 | A short-lived splinter group of the Social Credit Party, founded by ousted Social Credit leader John O'Brien. It placed fifth in the 1972 election, but failed to win any seats. |
| Imperial British Conservative Party | 1974 | ? | A joke party founded by Ian Brackenbury Channell, better known as "The Wizard of New Zealand". True to its name, it claimed to support imperialism, British people, and conservatism. |
| Mana Motuhake | 1979 | 2005 | The most prominent Māori-based party until the creation of the modern Māori Party. Mana Motuhake held a number of seats as part of the Alliance (see above), but most of its support has now been incorporated into the Māori Party. |
| McGillicuddy Serious Party | 1983 | 1999 | A joke party intended to satirise politics in general. Among other deliberately absurd policies it advocated the "Great Leap Backwards", a project to reverse the Industrial Revolution and to re-establish a medieval way of life. |
| New Zealand Party | 1983 | 1993 | A party established by property tycoon Bob Jones to promote free market economic policies and liberal social policies. It gained twelve percent of the vote in its first election, but then vanished almost completely. Some regard the modern ACT party as the New Zealand Party's ideological successor, but not everyone accepts this view. |
| Social Credit-NZ | 1988 | 1993 | A splinter party of Democrat Party, founded by former leader Bruce Beetham, believing the Democrats had abandoned Social Credit policies. It contested the 1990 election, but failed to win any seats. |
| Socialist Party of Aotearoa | 1990 | ? | Formed in 1990 through a split in the Socialist Unity Party, the party was best known through the influence of its late founder Bill Andersen, a well-known trade unionist who served as president of the Auckland Trades Council, national secretary of the Socialist Unity Party, and president of the National Distribution Union. |
| Mana Māori Movement | 1993 | 2005? | A party that addresses the concerns of New Zealand's indigenous Māori inhabitants, founded by Eva Rickard, a prominent Māori activist and a former Mana Motuhake candidate. |
| Natural Law Party | 1993 | 2001? | A party which based its principles on the concept of natural law as promoted by Maharishi Mahesh Yogi in his theory of Transcendental Meditation. It drew most of its support from the New Age movement. |
| Kiwis Against Further Immigration | 1994 | 1998? | An anti-immigration party founded as the New Zealand Defence Movement to contest the 1993 election it changed its name to Kiwis Against Further Immigration in 1994. |
| Advance New Zealand | 1995 | 1997 | A party that advocated for multiculturalism and the interests of ethnic minorities, with a substantial segment of its membership came from New Zealand's Pasifika communities. Advance New Zealand merged into United New Zealand in 1997. Not to be confused with the unrelated party of the same name founded in 2020. |
| Libertarianz | 1995 | 2014 | A libertarian party dedicated to laissez-faire capitalism and keeping government as small as possible. |
| Republican Party | 1995 | 2002 | A party established to promote the creation of a New Zealand Republic. The party contested the 1999 election, but only won 250 votes. Should not be confused with The Republic of New Zealand Party or the Republican Movement of Aotearoa New Zealand. |
| Progressive Green Party | 1995 | ? | An environmentalist party established in opposition to the generally left-wing policies of the larger Green Party. It contested only one election before vanishing, although many of its members became active in the National Party. |
| Christian Coalition | 1996 | 1997 | A brief alliance of the Christian Democrats and the Christian Heritage Party. It narrowly missed entering Parliament in the 1996 election, and disbanded shortly afterwards. |
| Animals First | 1996 | 2000 | A party dedicated to animal rights and animal welfare. It received 0.17% of the vote in 1996 and 0.16% of the vote in 1999, deregistered in 2000. |
| Nga Iwi Morehu Movement | 1996 | 2011 | A small Maori-based party which was active in a number of elections |
| Ethnic Minority Party | 1996 | 1997 | A party that advocated for the concerns of New Zealand's immigrant community, particularly Chinese and Indians. The popularity of New Zealand First, a party which opposed immigration, was a significant factor in its creation. It merged into United New Zealand, but little trace of it remains today. |
| Asia Pacific United Party | 1996 | 1999 | A party which attempted to gain support from Asian and Pasifika immigrants. It contested the 1996 election, but has since dissolved. |
| Green Society | 1996 | 2001 | A small environmentalist party. The Green Society believed that a true green party needed to be focused solely on the environment, and believed that the Green Party (then part of the Alliance) and the Progressive Green Party were both mistaken to take sides in economic and social debates. |
| Future New Zealand | 1998 | 2002 | A reconfiguration of the former Christian Democrat Party. Future New Zealand retained the same family values principles as the Christian Democrats, but abandoned the explicit religious basis. Future New Zealand merged with United New Zealand to form the modern United Future New Zealand. |
| South Island Party | ? | 2002 | A regionalist party which called for more autonomy for the South Island, the less populous of New Zealand's two main islands. It drew support predominantly from Otago and Southland. |
| Aotearoa NZ Youth Party | 1998 | 2011 | A platform for campaigner Robert Terry, who stood for electorate seats four times under this banner. |
| Freedom Movement | 1999 | ? | A registered party which contested the 1999 general elections, receiving 454 party votes. |
| NMP | 1999 | 2003 | NMP sought to abolish all political parties, among other policies. It contested two elections before disbanding. |
| Te Tawharau | 1999 | 2007 | A Māori party which split off from the Mana Māori Movement. It lapsed with the formation of the Māori Party. |
| One New Zealand Party | 1999 | 2006 | A small party modelled on Pauline Hanson's One Nation Party in Australia. It opposes all special policies towards Māori. |
| People's Choice Party | 1999 | 2002 | A small party which was registered for the 1999 election, but which is currently unregistered. It campaigned against MMP and in favour of reducing the size of Parliament. |
| Outdoor Recreation NZ | 2001 | 2007 | A party dedicated to promoting the interests of the hunting, fishing, and shooting communities. Outdoor Recreation New Zealand contested the 2005 election under the banner of the United Future party, although the parties did not actually merge. This working arrangement met with disappointing results. |
| Workers Party | 2002 | 2011 | Formerly known as the Anti-Capitalist Alliance. A coalition of socialists and anti-globalisation activists. |
| Destiny New Zealand | 2003 | 2007 | A party based in the Destiny Church, a Christian religious organisation. The party mostly campaigned on a family values platform, and strongly opposed legislative changes such as the creation of same-sex civil unions and the legalisation of prostitution. |
| Residents Action Movement | 2003 | 2010 | A left-wing party aiming to bring together social liberals, community activists, social democrats and left-wing radicals. |
| WIN Party | 2004 | 2006 | A single-issue party devoted to overturning the recently introduced smoking ban in bars and restaurants. |
| 99 MP Party | 2005 | 2006 | A party primarily focused on reducing the total number of MPs from 120 to 99. It also believed that all constitutional changes should be put to a referendum. |
| Direct Democracy Party | 2005 | 2009 | A party which sought to increase the participation of ordinary citizens in the political process. It advocated a system of referendums similar to that used by Switzerland. Not to be confused with another group formed in 2020 that joined Advance New Zealand. |
| Family Rights Protection Party | 2005 | 2007 | A party established by a group of Pasifika who claim that larger parties are taking the support of Pasifika for granted, and do not do enough to help them. |
| The Republic of New Zealand Party | 2005 | 2009 | A party focused on establishing a Republic in New Zealand. It also supports the adoption of a written constitution, the holding of referendums on major issues, and the abolition of race-specific government institutions. |
| Freedom Party | 2005 | 2005 | A party established by two former members of ACT New Zealand. Its policies were intended to be similar to those of ACT, but the party's founders said that the Freedom Party will be more democratic and accountable to its members. |
| Equal Values Party | 2005 | 2008 | A left-wing party active during the 2005 election. It supported free education and healthcare, an increase to social welfare benefits, and the establishment of compulsory superannuation schemes. |
| Family Party | 2007 | 2010 | A small Christian party established by the former Destiny New Zealand. |
| Kiwi Party | 2007 | 2012 | A revival of the Christian Democrats / Future New Zealand brand. The party advocates more representative direct democracy through referendums and a return to the "Judeo-Christian ethic in democracy". |
| Hapu Party | 2008 | 2008 | A Māori-based party established to challenge the Māori Party. |
| Bill and Ben Party | 2008 | 2010 | A joke party run by Bill and Ben, hosts of the TV show Pulp Sport. |
| New World Order Party | 2008 | 2011 | A party promoting global peace through a unified World Government. |
| Representative Party | 2008 | 2010 | The New Zealand Representative Party was led by Reg Turner, a former candidate for the ACT Party. The party claimed to have no policies, favouring seeking the opinions of voters on issues, and opposed traditional left-right politics. However, it also promoted populist referendums, deregulation, compulsory military service, "stopping the culture for young unmarried women to have babies", and restricting the welfare state. The party ran only a single candidate, Turner, in the 2008 election. By 2010, its website was defunct and it did not run any candidates in the 2011 election. |
| No Commercial Airport at Whenuapai Airbase Party | 2008 | 2008 | A local party which grew out of the movement opposing a commercial airport at Auckland's Whenuapai airbase. |
| New Zealand Liberals | 2008 | ? | A small party modelled on the old New Zealand Liberal Party and the UK Liberal Democrats. It advocates constitutional reform, republicanism, and civil rights. |
| Pirate Party of New Zealand | 2009 | 2017 | A copyright reform party based on the Swedish Pirate Party, with a focus on technological issues, like net neutrality. |
| New Citizen Party | 2010 | 2012 | A short-lived party formed to represent Chinese New Zealanders. It came third in the 2011 Botany by-election, but dissolved before contesting a general election. |
| Join Australia Movement Party | 2011 | 2011 | A party advocating union with Australia. |
| Sovereignty Party | 2011 | ? | A nationalist party which contest the 2011 election. |
| Reform New Zealand | 2011 | ? | A right-wing party advocating free market economics, low taxation, and reduced government. It was established by dissatisfied members of ACT New Zealand, and advocates similar policies of low taxation, privatisation, and reduced government. It never attempted to register with the New Zealand Electoral Commission and did not stand any candidates. |
| OurNZ Party | 2011 | 2011 | A party advocating a new currency, binding referendums, and a written constitution. |
| New Economics Party | 2011 | ? | A party advocating substantial economic reform such as a universal basic income and multiple currencies. It stood a single candidate in one election. |
| Thrive New Zealand | 2012 | 2013 | Party logo registered in August 2013. Advocated Direct Democracy via an online tool called RealVoice. |
| Focus NZ | 2012 | 2016 | A party aimed at representing rural New Zealand. |
| 1Law4All Party | 2013 | 2015 | A party aimed at overturning the Treaty of Waitangi. |
| Civilian Party | 2013 | 2015 | A joke party which arose from a popular New Zealand satirical website. |
| Expatriate Party | 2014 | 2014 | A party related to issues facing New Zealanders outside New Zealand. |
| Ban 1080 Party | 2014 | 2018 | A party that opposed the use of sodium fluoroacetate (1080) poison. |
| Internet Party | 2014 | 2018 | A party advocating for less surveillance, copyright reform and cheap internet. The Internet Party contested the 2014 general election in an alliance called Internet Party and Mana Movement, and contested the 2017 election on its own. |
| New Zealand People's Party | 2015 | 2020? | A party with a focus on immigrant rights. It became a component party of Advance New Zealand for the 2020 election. |
| Sustainable New Zealand Party | 2019 | 2021 | A Green Liberal party founded by former Green and National Member Vernon Tava. Considered to be "teal" or "blue-green" by the Media. |
| Heartland New Zealand Party | 2019? | 2023? | A rural-based, anti-environmentalist party led by former Mayor of Franklin District Mark Ball. |
| New Zealand Public Party | 2020 | 2021 | A component party of Advance New Zealand. Founded in June 2020 by Billy Te Kahika Jr. At its launch, Te Kahika said that the COVID-19 pandemic would enable globalist leaders to implement UN agendas that would totally control people's lives, and that billionaires had developed weaponised viruses and patented treatments for the viruses they had made, in order to enslave humanity. It merged with Advance New Zealand in July 2020. |
| Integrity Party | 2020 | 2020? | |
| Advance New Zealand | 2020 | 2021 | A party founded by former National Party MP Jami-Lee Ross. |
| Attica Project | 2020 | 2025 | Split from the NZ Outdoors & Freedom Party at the 2020 election. |
| New Zealand TEA Party | 2020 | 2022 | A fiscally conservative party. |
| DemocracyNZ | 2022 | 2024 | An anti-vaccine mandate party led by Matt King. |
| Freedoms New Zealand | 2022 | 2024 | A right-wing, populist political alliance co-led by Brian Tamaki and Sue Grey. |
| New Nation Party | 2022 | 2025 | A former component party of Freedoms New Zealand that opposed vaccine mandates, Three Waters, and the United Nations. |
| Rock the Vote NZ | 2022 | 2026 | A former, unregistered, component party of Freedoms New Zealand. In 2026, the party announced that they would not contest any more elections, and instead shift from a political party to a non-partisan civic movement. |
| New Zealand Momentum Party | 2022 | 2022 | An unregistered party founded by former Labour MP Gaurav Sharma to contest the 2022 Hamilton West by-election. |
| Leighton Baker Party | 2023 | 2024 | A party founded by former New Conservative Party leader Leighton Baker. |
| Democratic Alliance | 2023 | 2025 | A political alliance founded with the aim of uniting parties who did not want to join Freedoms NZ. Although registered for the 2023 election, the party did not field any candidates. |

== See also ==
- Politics of New Zealand
- Political funding in New Zealand
- List of political parties by country
- Socialism in New Zealand
- Liberalism in New Zealand
