= New Zealand Republican Party =

New Zealand Republican Party may refer to:

- New Zealand Republican Party (1967), political party founded in 1967, dissolved in 1974
- New Zealand Republican Party (1995), political party founded in 1995, dissolved in 2002

== See also ==
- The Republic of New Zealand Party, political party founded in 2005, dissolved in 2009
