= Republicanism in New Zealand =

Political movement in New Zealand

Republicanism in New Zealand is the political position that New Zealand's system of government should be changed from a constitutional monarchy to a republic.

New Zealand republicanism dates back to the 19th century, but it was only a fringe movement until the late 20th century. The main current republican lobby group, New Zealand Republic, was established in 1994.

Contemporary republican debate in New Zealand focuses on the issues of constitutional reform and New Zealand's independence. The matter of the Crown's obligations under the Treaty of Waitangi, and the treaty settlement process, is cited as a constitutional issue for a New Zealand republic. Most proponents of a republic support a parliamentary republic with the head of state separate from the head of government, with the head of state having limited power.

Because New Zealand's constitution is uncodified, a republic could be enacted by statute, as a simple act of parliament. It is generally assumed that this would only occur following a nationwide referendum. Several prime ministers and governors-general have identified themselves as republicans, but no government has yet taken any meaningful steps towards enacting a republic.

== History ==
The term "republic" in New Zealand has been used as a protest and a pejorative against the central government and/or royalty, to describe an area independent of the central government.

=== 19th century ===
The first use of the term "republic" to connote an independent state in New Zealand came in 1840 when Lieutenant-Governor William Hobson described the New Zealand Company settlement of Port Nicholson (Wellington), which had its own constitution and governing council, as such. The existence of the council prompted Hobson to declare British sovereignty over the entirety of New Zealand on 21 May 1840, despite the fact the Treaty of Waitangi was still being signed throughout the country. Hobson dispatched the Colonial Secretary, Willoughby Shortland along with some soldiers to demand the settlers disband their "illegal association" and remove the flag of the United Tribes of New Zealand.

Later, Wellington became the centre of agitation by settlers for representative government, which was granted by the New Zealand Constitution Act 1852. Samuel Revans, who founded the Wellington Settlers' Constitutional Association in 1848, advocated a New Zealand republic.

In 1879 the people of Hāwera declared themselves the "Republic of Hawera," due to a campaign by Māori leader Te Whiti against European settlement. They formed their own volunteer units to oppose Te Whiti. In 1881 government troops invaded Parihaka and arrested Te Whiti, bringing the "republic" to an end.

=== 20th century ===
In the 1911 general election Colonel Allen Bell, the Reform Party candidate for the Raglan seat, advocated the abolition of the monarchy. The armed forces considered that Bell had broken his Oath of Allegiance. He was asked to resign his commission, which he did in January 1912.

In 1966 Bruce Jesson founded the Republican Association of New Zealand, and later the Republican Party in 1967. The party had a stridently nationalist platform. Republican Party activity petered out after the 1969 general election and the party wound up in 1974.

In May 1973, a remit was proposed at the Labour Party national conference to change the flag, declare New Zealand a republic, and change the national anthem (then only "God Save the Queen"), but this was voted down.

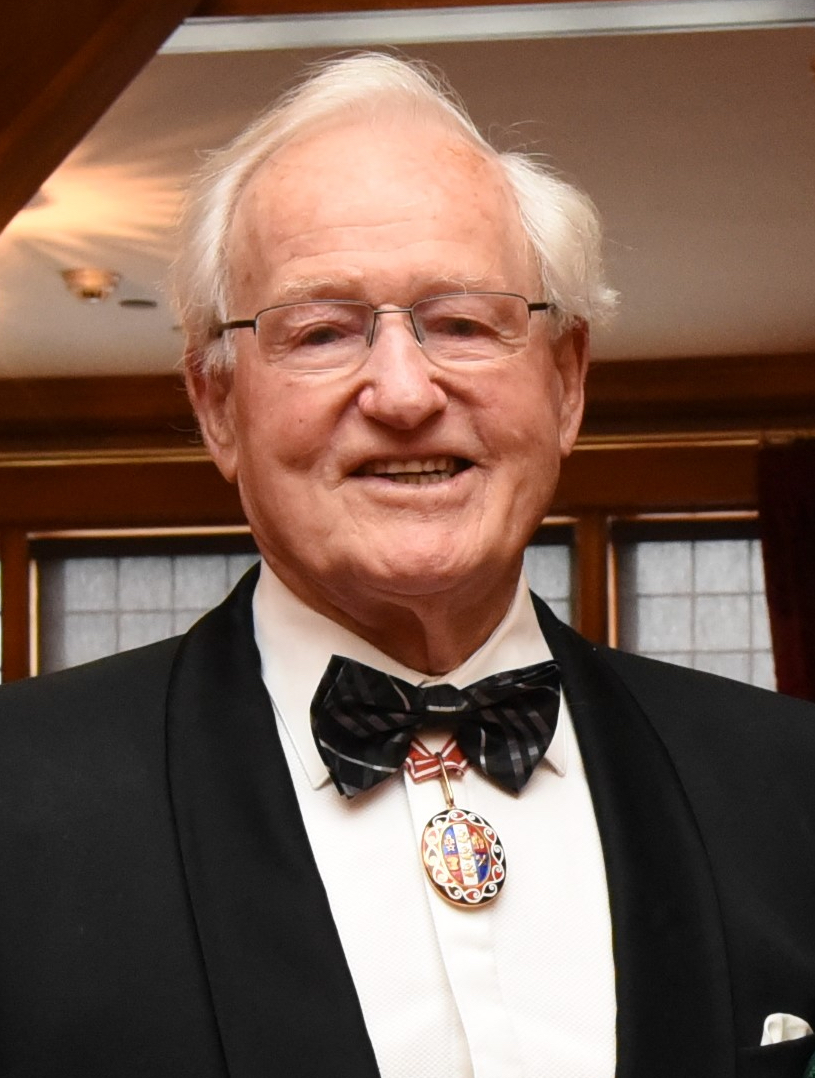
Jim Bolger, Prime Minister 1990–1997 and leader of the National Party, raised the republic issue in 1994.

In March 1994 the Republican Coalition of New Zealand was formed to promote the move to a republic. The following year, the Monarchist League of New Zealand (now Monarchy New Zealand) was established to defend the constitutional monarchy.

In 1994 Prime Minister Jim Bolger suggested to the 44th Parliament in the Address In Reply debate that New Zealand should move to become a republic by 2001. Bolger stated that New Zealand's links with Britain were in decline, and that the country should acknowledge that "the tide of history is moving in one direction"; when accused by Labour MP Trevor Mallard of "reading Paul Keating speeches, a reference to the then Prime Minister of Australia, Bolger replied "I do not read Labor Party speeches". He denied that his views relate to his Irish heritage.

Bolger spoke to Queen Elizabeth about the issue of New Zealand becoming a republic when he was prime minister and recalled "I have more than once spoken with Her Majesty about my view that New Zealand would at some point elect its own Head of State, we discussed the matter in a most sensible way and she was in no way surprised or alarmed and neither did she cut my head off."

In 1998, Richard Nottage, the Secretary of Foreign Affairs and Trade, called for New Zealand to consider becoming a republic, arguing that the position of the "British monarch" [sic] as head of state "looks strange in Asian eyes".

In 1999 the Republican Coalition relaunched itself as the Republican Movement of Aotearoa New Zealand, similar to the Australian Republican Movement, due to the 1999 Australian republic referendum, and again renamed itself in 2014 as New Zealand Republic.

=== 21st century ===
In November 2004, Prime Minister Helen Clark announced the formation of a parliamentary committee of inquiry, the Constitutional Arrangements Committee, chaired by United Future New Zealand leader Peter Dunne. In its final report, the committee recommended wider education on the constitution and included a note on the republic issue, asking "Is the nature of New Zealand's head of state, as a monarch, appropriate to New Zealand's evolving national and constitutional identity?".

Keith Locke's Head of State Referenda Bill for a referendum on the republic issue was drawn from the members' ballot and introduced into Parliament on 14 October 2009. The bill focused on reforming the governor-general of New Zealand as a ceremonial head of state, creating a parliamentary republic. Two models of a republic along with the status quo would have been put to a referendum:

- Election of the head of state indirectly by a supermajority of members of Parliament, similar to the bi-partisan appointment model proposed in Australia;
- Election of the head of state directly by the New Zealand electorate using the Single Transferable Vote electoral system, similar to Ireland.

On 21 April 2010 the bill was defeated at its first reading 53–68 with voting recorded as Ayes 53 being New Zealand Labour 43; Green Party 9; United Future 1 and Noes 68 being New Zealand National 58; ACT New Zealand 5; Māori Party 4; Progressive 1.

== The debate ==
=== Arguments for change ===
Supporters of a New Zealand republic have said:

- New Zealand should have a New Zealander, or more correctly a New Zealand citizen resident in New Zealand, as its head of state; a "resident for president";
- New Zealand needs to assert its independence, nationhood and maturity to the world;
- New Zealand's constitution—and indeed the attitudes of New Zealanders—are republican in their outlook.
- New Zealand already maintains the governor-general—who is described as a "virtual head of state". The governor-general is a New Zealander and does everything the head of state should do;
- Because the sovereign and governor-general have little real power, they are not an effective check on the parliamentary executive (the prime minister and Cabinet), the argument that the sovereign or governor-general "denies power" to politicians and is politically neutral yet can fire a prime minister is contradictory;
- An elected or appointed head of state would be a more effective check on the executive;
- A republic does not necessarily mean withdrawing from the Commonwealth. As of June 2022, 36 out of the 56 member states (65%) are republics.
- The prime minister should not have the power to dismiss the governor-general at will and vice versa.

Other republicans have focused on the principles of a monarchy: many disagree with the hereditary principle (based on a form of primogeniture) that determines succession of the throne. They argue that in a modern and democratic society no one should be expected to defer to another simply because of their birth. Some assert that the hereditary monarch and unelected governor-general have no mandate to dismiss an elected government.

At the Commonwealth Heads of Government Meeting of October 2011, the leaders of the 16 Commonwealth realms agreed that they would support change to their respective succession laws regarding male primogeniture, and allow the monarch to marry a Roman Catholic. The ban on Catholics from being the monarch would remain, because the monarch has to be in "Communion with the Church of England."

=== Arguments against change ===
Supporters of the monarchy in New Zealand have said:

- "Constitutional monarchy is tried and proven system of government, some of the most politically stable nations in the world are constitutional monarchies; whereas some of the most unstable and repressive regimes have been republics." In the words of former Governor-General Sir Michael Hardie Boys, "If it ain't broke, don't fix it".
- For New Zealand, "monarchy summarises the inheritance of a thousand years of constitutional government and our links with a glorious past,"
- New Zealand is already an independent, sovereign nation with a national identity of its own;
- The monarchy is a symbol of unity between New Zealand and the other Commonwealth realms that share the same person as monarch; part of a "global family".
- The monarch is politically neutral and is a symbol of national unity rather than division;
- The monarch has "little real practical political powers and is a protector of and not a threat to democracy";
- Hereditary selection of the sovereign is the "most natural" non-partisan way to choose a leader.

=== Cost ===
Supporters of the monarchy have argued that it costs New Zealand taxpayers only a small outlay for royal engagements and tours, and the modest expenses of the governor-general's establishment. They state "[t]his figure is about one dollar per person per year", about $4.3 million per annum. An analysis by New Zealand Republic in 2010 wrote that the office of governor-general cost New Zealand taxpayers about $7.6 million in ongoing costs. They compared this cost to the president of Ireland, a head of state of a country with a similar population size, who cost €3.4 million – NZ$6 million on the exchange rate at the time. Monarchy New Zealand said that republicanism supporters arbitrarily inflated the costs on the governor-general, instead stating that the Irish President's cost was closer to NZ$12.8 million once the extra costs were included.

== Public opinion ==
Date	Participants	Firm	Republic	Monarchy	Neutral/Undecided	Lead	Notes
6 February – 23 March 2023	2,012	Lord Ashcroft	34%	44%	6%	10%	
29 September – 6 October 2022	1,016	Talbot Mills	27%	38%	36%	11%	
17–21 September 2022	not stated	1News Kantar	27%	50%	23%	23%	Not stated if weighed
November 2021	not stated	1News Kantar	33%	47%	20%	14%	Not stated if weighed
22–26 October 2020	1,003	Research New Zealand	20%	44%	36%	24%	Online poll
8–24 April 2019	1,000	Curia	55%	39%	6%	11%	Non-standard question
26 November – 3 December 2008	500	Research New Zealand	42%	48%	9%	6%	Non-standard question

As of 2010, the New Zealand public were generally in favour of the retention of the monarchy, with polls showing it to have between 50 and 70% support. Polls indicate that many New Zealanders see the monarchy as being of little day-to-day relevance; a One News/Colmar Brunton poll in 2002 found that 58% of the population believed the monarchy has little or no relevance to their lives. National Business Review poll in 2004 found 57% of respondents believed New Zealand would become a republic "in the future".

The institution still enjoys the support of New Zealanders, particularly those born before World War II. Some show a majority of younger New Zealanders support a republic. With the approval of the current monarch, and the position of the Treaty of Waitangi under a republic remaining a concern to Māori and other New Zealanders alike, as well as the question of what constitutional form a republic might take unresolved, support for becoming a republic is still the view of around a third to 40% of the population. On 21 April 2008, New Zealand Republic released a poll of New Zealanders showing 43% support the monarchy should the Prince of Wales become King of New Zealand, and 41% support a republic under the same scenario. A poll by The New Zealand Herald in January 2010, before a visit by Prince William to the country found 33.3% wanted The Prince of Wales to be the next monarch, with 30.2% favouring Prince William. 29.4% of respondents preferred a republic in the event Elizabeth II died or abdicated.

An October 2011 survey of 500 business professionals asked "What Is Your Level Of Support For New Zealand Becoming A Republic?". 27% said not at all, 24% said somewhat opposed, 23.1% were neutral, 14.8% said moderately in favour and 11.1% said strongly in favour.

On the eve of a royal tour by Charles, Prince of Wales (later King Charles III), and Camilla, Duchess of Cornwall, in November 2012, a ONE News/Colmar Brunton poll reported 70% of people questioned responded they wanted to keep the Queen as head of state, while 19% supported New Zealand becoming a republic. Following the tour, a different poll by Curia Market Research commissioned by New Zealand Republic found 51% of respondents wanted Charles as King once the Queen's reign ends, while 41% supported a republic.

On 17 July 2013, a televised debate on TV3's The Vote held three polls, two separate votes by the studio audience at the start and end of the programme, and one via Twitter, Facebook, web and text voting, on the question "Should we ditch the Royals?" The first studio audience vote before the show was 43% yes, and the second after the show was 65%, while the public vote result was 41% yes and 59% no.

From 8 to 24 April 2019, a nationwide poll of 1,000 randomly-selected voting-age New Zealanders was conducted, which showed that 55% of New Zealanders want a New Zealander as the country's next head of state, while 39% want the next British monarch. Support for a New Zealander being the country's next head of state was recorded strongest among Māori respondents, with 80% in support, and respondents aged 18–30, with 76% in support.

Following the 2020 general election, an online poll of 1,003 New Zealanders aged eighteen and over found that 20% agreed that "New Zealand should become a republic", with 36% of the respondents remaining neutral and 44% disagreeing outright. The poll also found that 19% wanted to change the national flag, and ten% wanted to change the country's name.

A 1News/Kantar poll conducted shortly after the death of Queen Elizabeth in September 2022 found increased support for the monarchy: 50% of respondents wanted to retain the monarch, with 27% supporting a republic.

=== Political party positions ===
As of 2013, three political parties with members in New Zealand's parliament had a policy of holding a binding referendum on the republic issue.

==== Labour ====
The Labour Party adopted a policy of holding a binding referendum on the issue at their 2013 conference. Then-leader Andrew Little supported a New Zealand republic, saying "when it comes to our constitutional arrangements in New Zealand I have a firm view that our head of state should come from New Zealand." Former Labour Prime Minister Jacinda Ardern states that she is a republican, and that she would "encourage national debate over cutting ties with the royal family".

In 2002, Labour Prime Minister Helen Clark stated:

"…the idea of a nation such as New Zealand being ruled by a head of state some 20,000 km away is absurd. It is inevitable that New Zealand will become a republic. It is just a matter of when the New Zealand people are bothered enough to talk about it – it could be 10 years, or it could be 20 years, but it will happen."

Then-Deputy Prime Minister Michael Cullen declared that he supported the monarchy, stating in 2004 he was "a sort of token monarchist in the Cabinet these days." In 2010 he repudiated that stance, taking the view that New Zealand should move towards a republic once the Queen's reign ends. Former Prime Minister David Lange expressed support for a New Zealand republic, stating: "Do such things matter? They certainly do. We suffer in this country from a lack of emotional focus... New Zealand will become a republic just as Britain will be blurred into Europe".

In 2023, Prime Minister Chris Hipkins stated that although he favoured a republic, he did not intend to pursue New Zealand becoming a republic during his premiership: "Ideally, in time, New Zealand will become a fully independent country, will stand on our own two feet in the world, as we by and large do now ... I don’t think that swapping out the governor general for some other form of head of state is necessarily an urgent priority right now, though."

==== National ====
The National Party's constitution specifies that the party's visions and values include "Loyalty to our country, its democratic principles and our Sovereign as Head of State". In 2001, a constitutional policy task force recommended holding a referendum on the monarchy after the reign of Queen Elizabeth came to an end, along with referendums on the future of the Māori seats and the number of MPs. Only the policy on Māori seats was passed by the party's regional conferences. Former MPs John Carter, and Wayne Mapp and Richard Worth have been among the most vocal supporters of the monarchy within the party. At the 2011 elections, former Chair of Monarchy New Zealand Simon O'Connor was elected as MP for Tamaki and his Deputy Paul Foster-Bell was later elected a List MP in 2013 and both were re-elected at the 2014 election.

At the 2014 election the former Chair of New Zealand Republic, Lewis Holden, was nominated as candidate for the Rimutaka electorate but failed to enter Parliament with incumbent Labour MP Chris Hipkins retaining the electorate, and Holden holding a list ranking too low (at 66 on the National list) to enter parliament. Among the 2014 caucus of new National Members of Parliament, a number of portraits of the Queen have been placed in their Wellington offices through an initiative led by Monarchy New Zealand. In 2009, former Prime Minister John Key said he was "not convinced it [a republic] will be a big issue in the short term", but that he thinks a republic is "inevitable"; since this statement he has affirmed his support for the monarchy and made it clear that while he was prime minister a republic would not happen "on his watch".

==== Green ====
Support for a republic is strongest amongst the supporters of the Green Party, and it is party policy to support a "democratic and participatory process, such as referenda". Former Green MP Keith Locke had a member's bill drawn on the issue, the Head of State Referenda Bill, for a referendum on the issue, but it was voted down at its first reading in parliament in 2009.

==== Minor parties ====
During a debate for the 2020 election, John Tamihere of the Māori Party voiced support for New Zealand to become a republic after the death of Queen Elizabeth (which had not then occurred), saying, "it's about time". Winston Peters of New Zealand First stated that the question of a republic should be resolved through a two-step referendum.

Former United Future New Zealand leader Peter Dunne is a supporter of a New Zealand republic. The party had a policy of "a public education process on constitutional matters, leading towards consideration of New Zealand as a republic within the Commonwealth in the future."

=== Governors-general ===
In 2004 former Governor-General Dame Catherine Tizard said publicly that the monarch should be replaced by a New Zealand head of state. Her predecessor, Sir Paul Reeves has stated that he would not oppose a republic. Sir Michael Hardie Boys has supported the status quo. On 29 July 2006, outgoing Governor-General Dame Silvia Cartwright stated she had no views as to whether New Zealand becomes a republic, noting: "We often overlook the intense loyalty and love the Māori people have for the Queen – probably more intense than many people of European descent. This is a history that's never going to die."

== Constitutional issues ==
New Zealand is a unitary state and does not have a codified, entrenched constitution. Some have argued New Zealand is a de facto republic. New Zealand has made constitutional changes without difficulty in the past, such as the abolition of its upper house of parliament in 1951, the introduction of proportional representation in 1996 and most recently the creation of the Supreme Court of New Zealand as the court of final appeal. Legal academics have espoused the view that the legal changes required for a republic are not complex. Some have argued that the changes required are less radical than the move to MMP in 1996.

=== Type of republic ===
Most proponents of a republic, such as Sir Geoffrey Palmer and Andrew Butler, support a parliamentary republic, that is, a republic where the head of state and government are separated. Alison Quentin-Baxter and Janet McLean argue that republican advocates in New Zealand show "...a strong preference for constitutions based on the parliamentary system of government as being a more stable basis for democratic government than those based on a presidential system." A head of state in such a system would have the same reserve powers as the sovereign and governor-general.

=== Treaty of Waitangi / Te Tiriti o Waitangi ===
The Treaty of Waitangi (Māori: Te Tiriti o Waitangi) is an agreement signed between Māori tribes and representatives of the British Crown, signed in 1840. Because of the relationship between Māori and the Crown, the Treaty of Waitangi is often cited as a constitutional issue for a New Zealand republic. Some academics expressed concern that governments could use republicanism to evade treaty responsibilities. With the division of the Crown between the United Kingdom and New Zealand following the passing of the Statute of Westminster Adoption Act 1947, the "Crown in Right of New Zealand" became party to the Treaty. Legal academics state that the Treaty would be unaffected by New Zealand becoming a republic, as the new head of state would inherit the Crown's responsibilities. In 2004, Professor Noel Cox argued "In strict legal terms, if New Zealand became a republic tomorrow it would make no difference to the Treaty of Waitangi. Speaking as a lawyer, it's a long-established principle that successive governments take on responsibility for previous agreements."

=== Realm of New Zealand ===
The Realm of New Zealand consists of New Zealand proper and two states in free association, Niue and the Cook Islands. Should New Zealand become a republic, the Realm of New Zealand would continue to exist without New Zealand, the Ross Dependency and Tokelau. This would not be a legal hurdle to a New Zealand republic, and both the Cook Islands and Niue would retain their status as associated states with New Zealand, as New Zealand shares its head of state with the Cook Islands and Niue in the same way the United Kingdom shares its head of state with the other Commonwealth realms.

== Commonwealth membership ==
Following the Commonwealth Heads of Government Meeting 2007, the Kampala Communiqué stated "Heads of Government also agreed that, where an existing member changes its formal constitutional status, it should not have to reapply for Commonwealth membership provided that it continues to meet all the criteria for membership."

== See also ==
- New Zealand flag debate, a related issue

Former political parties

- New Zealand Republican Party (1967)
- New Zealand Republican Party (1995)
- The Republic of New Zealand Party
