= Frank Smyth =

New Zealand rugby player (1891–1972)

- Born: Bernard Francis Smyth; 11 February 1891 Boatmans, Buller, New Zealand
- Died: 15 July 1972 (aged 81) Christchurch, New Zealand
- Height: 1.77 m (5 ft 9 1/2 in)
- Weight: 78 kg (172 lb)
- Notable relative: Peter Dunne (grandson)
- Occupation(s): Bricklayer, publican

Rugby union career
- Position: Hooker
Provincial / State sides
Years	Team	Apps	(Points)
1915	Canterbury	1	
International career
Years	Team	Apps	(Points)
1922	New Zealand	0	(0)

Bernard Francis Smyth (11 February 1891 – 15 July 1972) was a New Zealand rugby union player.

== Playing career ==
A hooker, Smyth played a single representative game for Canterbury in 1915, one match for the South Island in 1922 and was a member of the New Zealand national side, the All Blacks, also in 1922. He played three matches for the All Blacks but did not appear in any internationals.

== Military service ==
Smyth served in the No. 3 Field Company, New Zealand Engineers, during World War I. He enlisted in December 1915 as a sapper, and had risen to the rank of sergeant by the time of his discharge in June 1919. He saw action at Ypres, Passchendaele and the Somme, and was mentioned in dispatches, by Sir Douglas Haig on 7 April 1918.

== Death and legacy ==
Smyth died in Christchurch on 15 July 1972, and was buried at Memorial Park Cemetery in Bromley. His grandson is the politician, Peter Dunne.
