= Equal Values Party =

The Aotearoa New Zealand Equal Values Party was a small political party in New Zealand. It claimed that the "basic requirements for life" were not being met by either of the two main parties in New Zealand politics (Labour and National), and that a new vision was needed for the country.

Its policies included:

- The elimination of student loan debt and the provision of free education.
- Free doctor's visits, medicine, and dental care for those under 19 years old or over 65 years old.
- The increase of social welfare payments.
- The establishment of compulsory workplace savings schemes.
- Tax cuts, particularly for exporters.
- Shorter prison sentences for non-violent crimes and lesser offences, with more focus on restorative justice and home detention sentencing.

The party's leader was Adele Hughes. The party was launched on 27 January 2005, but was never registered with the Electoral Commission, meaning that it could not contest the party vote. During the 2005 election it ran a single candidate, and received 86 votes.

The party did not contest the 2008 elections, and is now defunct.
