= Future New Zealand (Dunne) =

1994 establishments in New Zealand

Future New Zealand was the name chosen by Peter Dunne for the party he founded after leaving the Labour Party. After spending several months as an independent, Dunne formed Future New Zealand as a centrist party in late 1994. The new party lasted only a short time before being overtaken by United New Zealand, established by a group of centrist MPs from both major parties. Dunne opted to integrate his Future New Zealand into the larger United in 1995, hoping to establish a broad centrist coalition. Dunne later became leader of United when all its other MPs were defeated in the 1996 election. In 2002, United merged with a different party also named Future New Zealand, and adopted its modern name, United Future.
