= New World Order Party =

- Leader: Nathan Lee Couper
- President: Nathan Lee Couper
- Deputy: Justin Mclean
- Founded: 2006
- Headquarters: Bahrain country territory
- Ideology: New World Order
- International affiliation: Board and Party Membership
- Colours: Black and White
- MPs in the House of Representatives: None

Website
- newworldorderpoliticalparty.webs.com

The New World Order was a registered political party in New Zealand. The party was founded in 2006 by Nathan Lee Couper. Its stated goal was to bring about global peace through a unified World Government. The Chief of the WGEC is Stephanie Monique Smith.

The Political Party's president and Secretary was Nathan Lee Couper and the party's International Board Manager was Justin Mclean.

On 1 April 2008 the party formally applied for registration with the New Zealand Electoral Commission. It was registered on 20 May 2008. Couper collected signatures and spare change from passersby on the street in order to satisfy the legal requirements for 500 financial members. He admitted not all 500 members actually paid a fee.

The party applied for broadcasting funding, and was allocated $10,000. Despite receiving an allocation and receiving extensive coverage on Eating Media Lunch, a satirical current affairs program, the party did not run any candidates in the 2008 election as it did not provide the thousand dollar deposit to nominate a party list.

== 2010–11 ==
In May 2010 the party registered a logo with the Electoral Commission.

The party did not apply for broadcasting funding for the 2011 election, and its registration was cancelled, at the party's request, on 9 June 2011.

== 2023 ==
In the 2023 general election NWO Party founder Nathan Lee Couper was a candidate in the Hamilton East electorate. He was listed on the ballot as representing the "New World Order McCann Party".
