= Freedom Party (New Zealand) =

The Freedom Party logo.

The Freedom Party was a political party in New Zealand.

It was founded by Gareth Turner and Paul King, formerly members of the ACT New Zealand party. The party was announced on 13 March 2005, the same day that Turner failed to unseat Catherine Judd as president of ACT. Turner and King claimed that the leaders of ACT were ignoring ordinary members, and were too closely influenced by big business. Turner claimed that the party would have enough support to register for the 2005 elections, but this did not occur. The party did not nominate any candidates.
