= Hapu Party =

Political party in New Zealand

The Hapu Party was a Māori political party in New Zealand that was formed in August 2008 and contested the Te Tai Tokerau seat in the 2008 general election. The party was led by David Rankin, a leader of the Matarahurahu hapū of Northland.

== Policies and actions ==
The Hapu Party believed that because of poorer Māori health outcomes, and therefore reduced life expectancy, Māori should be eligible for the pension at age 56. It planned to introduce a flat 18% rate for personal tax and GST. It sought to have Treaty of Waitangi settlement monies allocated directly to hapū and marae, and to allow Treaty claims to be made over private land.

The Hapu Party had hoped to have candidates in all seven Māori electorates for the 2008 election, but stood only one candidate. David Rankin, a leader of the Matarahurahu hapū of Northland and the party leader, stood in Te Tai Tokerau and received 202 votes (1% of the total in the electorate). The party did not run in the 2011 election.

== Leadership ==
David Rankin, the party leader, became involved in a number of controversies, including attempting to ban Māori Party MP Hone Harawira and his mother Titewhai Harawira from Waitangi Day commemorations in 2007. Later he called for Harawira's resignation following Harawira's allegations of racism towards the Australian prime minister. Rankin became involved in the question of authenticity surrounding the auction of a piece of the famous Kororāreka flagpole cut down in Russell in 1844 as an act of defiance against British authority, by his great great uncle Hōne Heke.
