= Thrive New Zealand =

Thrive New Zealand Party logo

Thrive New Zealand, formerly called the Unified New Zealand Party, was a small political party in New Zealand. The party was founded in 2012 by David Ding, a marketing manager.

On 7 November 2012 the party applied to register a logo with the Electoral Commission. The party subsequently changed its name to Thrive New Zealand and registered a substitute logo. As Unified New Zealand, the party opposed asset sales and foreign ownership and supported economic self-sufficiency a return to the gold standard. Following its name change, the party focused strongly on direct democracy and binding citizens-initiated referendums.

The party never stood any candidates for parliament. By January 2017, their website was defunct.
