= New Zealand Republican Party (1967) =

Political party founded in 1967, dissolved in 1974

The New Zealand Republican Party of 1967 was a political party which campaigned for the creation of a New Zealand republic. It was founded by Bruce Jesson in 1967, and was linked to the Republican Association.

It did not win any seats in Parliament, and was dissolved in 1974. Instead, a new publication was created, The Republican, which was published until 1995. In 1995 another republican party, which was also subsequently dissolved, arose under the same name. The two are unconnected.

== See also ==
- Republicanism in New Zealand
- Republican Association of New Zealand
- Bruce Jesson
