= New Zealand Liberal Party (2008) =

Liberal Party
- Leader: Jonathan Lee
- Founder: Jonathan Lee
- Founded: March 10, 2008
- Dissolved: May 2010
- Ideology: Social liberalism

The Liberal Party was a political party in New Zealand which promoted social liberalism. It was founded on 10 March 2008 (18 years ago).

The party was an attempt to revive the old New Zealand Liberal Party. It aimed to be a broad progressive party which appeals to middle New Zealand. Policies included a written constitution, improved public healthcare, and universal pre-school education.

The party was led by Jonathan Lee, a former public servant and policy advisor to Bill Birch. It applied to register a party logo with the Electoral Commission on 13 March 2008. This application was accepted on 2 April 2008. On 24 April 2008, the party applied for broadcasting funding; according to their initial submission the party was incorporated and was seeking candidates and a patron to publicly endorse the party.

The party was not registered for the 2008 General Election, and did not stand any candidates. As of May 2010 (16 years ago), its website was defunct.
