= Republican Association of New Zealand =

The Republican Association of New Zealand (NZRA) was a political organisation in New Zealand with the aim of supporting the creation of a New Zealand republic.

== History ==
The Association was founded by left-wing activist Bruce Jesson in February 1966 as the Committee to Oppose Royal Tours. It changed its name to the Republican Association in June 1966. It gained wide publicity for its anti-royal activism, including the burning of the Union Flag, defacing currency, and protesting during Royal visits. When the Governor-General Bernard Fergusson was awarded an honorary degree later in 1966 by the University of Canterbury, the NZRA and around 400 supporters tried to block Worcester Street (which was on the Governor-General's route to the university), chanting "We object to the honorary degree, the honorary degree" to the tune of The Beatles Yellow Submarine. Around 200 students counter-protested with a banner reading "We Love the Gov".

In 1967, Jesson moved the Association to Auckland and founded the original Republican Party of New Zealand.

== See also ==
- Republicanism in New Zealand
- Republican Movement of Aotearoa New Zealand
