= Bruce Jesson =

New Zealand journalist

- Born: 1944; Christchurch, New Zealand
- Died: 30 April 1999 (aged 54–55); Auckland, New Zealand
- Occupation: Journalist
- Spouse: Joce Jesson

Bruce Edward Jesson (1944 – 30 April 1999) was a journalist, author and political figure in New Zealand.

== Early life ==
Bruce Edward Jesson was the son of Victor John and Edna Cavell (née Taylor) Jesson, and the great-grandson of an immigrant from Leicestershire in England. He was educated at Christchurch Boys' High School and the University of Canterbury, where he gained a bachelor's degree in law. He worked briefly as a law clerk, but refused to swear allegiance to the Queen, and was never admitted to the Bar.

== Political activism ==
As a student in the 1960s, he was initially attracted to the Communist Party of New Zealand which tried to groom him to be the party's lawyer. The CPNZ had been the first communist party in the world to side with China in the Sino-Soviet split. However, Jesson struck out on his own, writing a number of polemics such as Traitors to Class and Country: A Study of the Conservative Left and publishing a journal called Te Tao ("The Spear"). As a student he was involved in anti-Royalist activities, and in April 1966 was fined £40 for painting slogans during a visit by the Queen Mother. The sentence was overturned in June 1966 after a judge found Jesson had been denied the right to legal counsel by police. He founded the committee to Oppose Royal Tours (CORT).

=== Republicanism ===
Jesson was a republican who championed an independent political and intellectual culture in New Zealand. He rebelled against the habit of the New Zealand Left to take its political cues from overseas countries. He founded the anti-royal Republican Association in 1966, later moving to Auckland (first to Pōkeno, later Ōtāhuhu and finally Māngere) and forming a political party (the original Republican Party) to push the republic issue in 1967. Around 1970 he also associated briefly with Trotskyist activists such as Owen Gager and David Bedggood, and he contributed occasionally to journals such as Dispute, New Zealand Monthly Review and Spartacist Spasmodical.

When activity in the fledgling Republican Party petered out, Jesson wound up the party in 1974, but continued to publish a widely read pro-republican broadsheet entitled The Republican (1974–1995), covering both republican and leftwing issues in a plain and unpretentious style. This journal also featured articles by many other New Zealand leftists. (The Republican merged into Chris Trotter's New Zealand Political Review in 1995). Jesson was a founding member of the Republican Movement of Aotearoa New Zealand, until his death in 1999.

By this time, Jesson – who never had much of a steady career, working variously as labourer, wool presser, baker, dustman and freezing worker – was living with his wife Joce (Jocelyn née Brown), an educationist and tutor/lecturer, and worked as a househusband as well as pursuing his writing. He was interested in developing an indigenous Marxian tradition in New Zealand, and participated in the four NZ Marxian Political Economy conferences staged in the 1970s and early 1980s.

=== Maori Sovereignty ===
Around the time of the mass protests against the Springbok rugby tour of New Zealand in 1981, he associated with Māori activists such as Donna Awatere, Dun Mihaka, Syd Jackson and Ripeka Evans who sought to put Māori nationalism on the political agenda. The first drafts of Awatere's famous book Maori Sovereignty were published in The Republican.

== Mainstream publications ==
It was only late in his life that Jesson became better known to the general public, as a political columnist for Auckland's Metro magazine and contributor to other magazines such as North & South and New Zealand Political Review. He also published four books about the neo-liberal revolution in New Zealand, and became a fellow of the Auckland University Political Science Department.

== Entering politics ==
In 1990, Jesson joined Jim Anderton's Labour party splinter NewLabour Party. He stood as a candidate for the party in the Panmure electorate in 1990. He again stood in Panmure in 1993, for the Alliance.

In 1991, he was elected to the Auckland Regional Council in a by-election as an Alliance candidate. He became chair of the Auckland Regional Services Trust between 1992 and 1995.

== Death ==
Jesson died of cancer in the Auckland suburb of Māngere Bridge on 30 April 1999.

== Legacy ==
An anthology of his later articles has been published posthumously as Bruce Jesson: To Build a Nation – Collected Writings 1975 – 1999 (2005). The Bruce Jesson papers are archived at the University of Auckland Library.

The Bruce Jesson Foundation was established in his honour in 1999. The Trust Board was chaired by former Prime Minister David Lange from 1999 until his death in 2005; by Professor Andrew Sharp until 2006; by Professor Jane Kelsey until 2012; and since then by Sir Edmund Thomas. The main public programs are the annual Bruce Jesson Memorial Lecture. Speakers have included David Lange (inaugural lecture in 2000), Brian Easton (2001), Chris Trotter (2002), Ani Mikaere (2004), Laila Harre (2007), Mike Lee (2008), Robert Wade (2009), Annette Sykes (2010), Nicky Hager (2012), Ted Thomas (2013), Mike Joy (2014), and Rod Oram (2015).

== Bibliography ==
- Jesson, Bruce; Sturt, John (1965). Traitors to class and country: A study of the Conservative Left. Christchurch, New Zealand: Workers Action Movement. OCLC 17064728.
- Jesson, Bruce (1980). The Fletcher Challenge: Wealth and Power in New Zealand. Pōkeno, New Zealand: B. Jesson. OCLC 153921580.
- Jesson, Bruce; Ryan, Allanah; Spoonley, Paul (1988). Revival of the right: New Zealand politics in the 1980s. Birkenhead, Auckland: Heinemann Reed. ISBN 9780790000039.
- Jesson, Bruce (1987). Behind the mirror glass: The growth of wealth and power in New Zealand in the eighties. Auckland, New Zealand: Penguin Books. OCLC 22469075.
- Jesson, Bruce (1989). Fragments of labour: the story behind the labour government. Auckland, New Zealand New York, New York, USA: Penguin Books. ISBN 9780140128161.
- Jesson, Bruce (March–April 1992). "The disintegration of a Labour tradition: New Zealand politics in the 1980s". New Left Review. I (192).(subscription required)
- Jesson, Bruce (1999). Only their purpose is mad: the money men take over New Zealand. Palmerston North, New Zealand: Dunmore Press. ISBN 9780864693433.
- Jesson, Bruce (2005). Sharp, Andrew (ed.). To build a nation: collected writings 1975-1999. Auckland, New Zealand New York: Penguin Books. ISBN 9780143020523.

== See also ==
- New Zealand literature
