= Peter Dunne =

New Zealand politician

The Honourable Peter Dunne CNZM
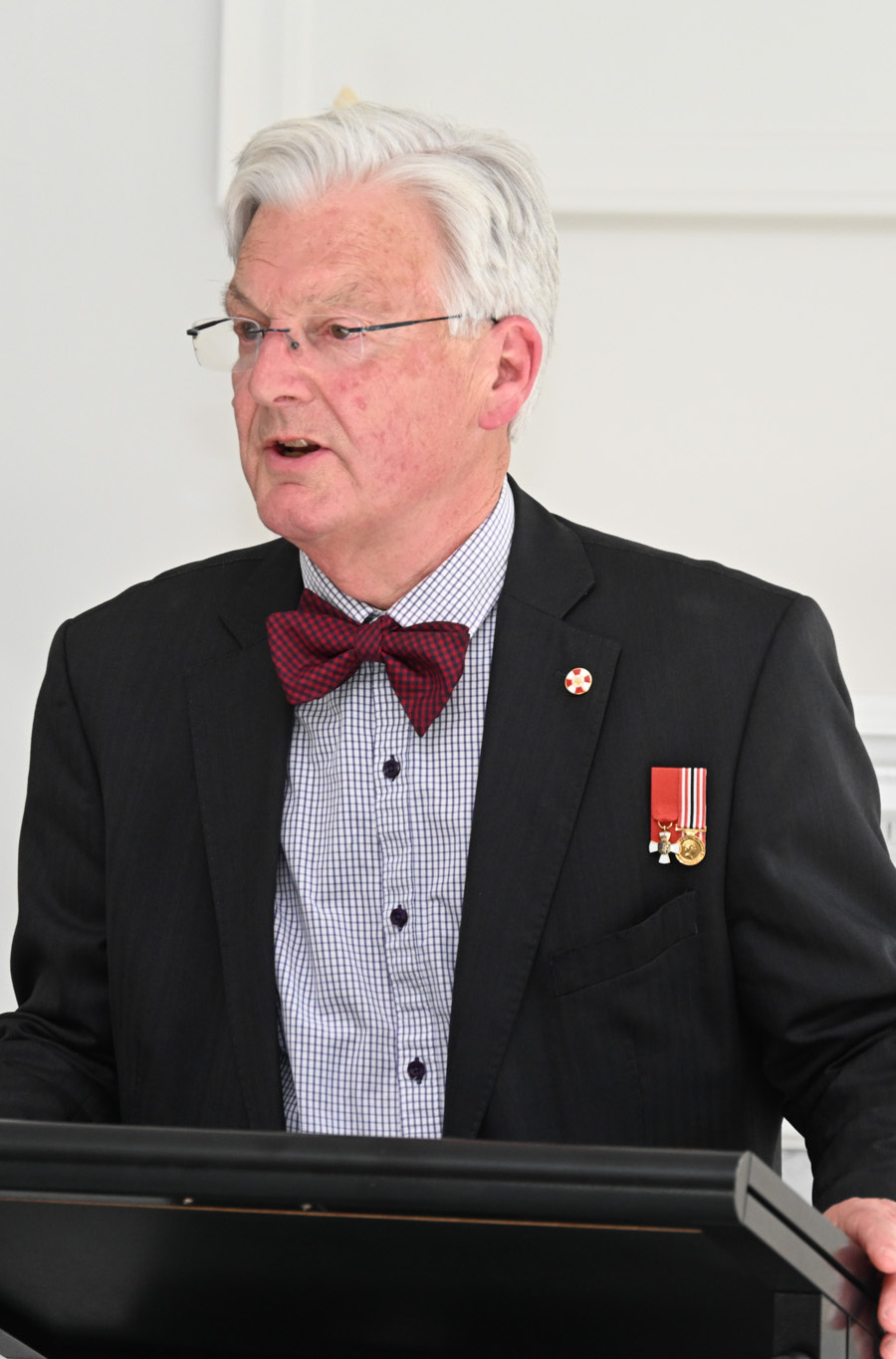
- Dunne in 2023

26th Minister of Internal Affairs
- In office 28 January 2014 – 21 October 2017
- Prime Minister: John Key; Bill English
- Preceded by: Chris Tremain
- Succeeded by: Tracey Martin
- In office 29 February 1996 – 16 December 1996
- Prime Minister: Jim Bolger
- Preceded by: Warren Cooper
- Succeeded by: Jack Elder

22nd Minister of Revenue
- In office 17 October 2005 – 7 June 2013
- Prime Minister: Helen Clark; John Key
- Preceded by: Michael Cullen
- Succeeded by: Todd McClay
- In office 29 February 1996 – 16 December 1996
- Prime Minister: Jim Bolger
- Preceded by: Wyatt Creech
- Succeeded by: Bill Birch

Leader of United Future
- In office 2002 – 23 August 2017
- Deputy: Judy Turner
- Preceded by: Position established
- Succeeded by: Damian Light

Member of the New Zealand Parliament for Ōhāriu Onslow (1993–1996) Ohariu-Belmont (1996–2008)
- In office 17 July 1984 – 23 September 2017
- Preceded by: Hugh Templeton
- Succeeded by: Greg O'Connor
- Majority: 710

Personal details
- Born: Peter Francis Dunne; 17 March 1954 (age 72) Christchurch, New Zealand
- Party: United Future (2002–2017)
- Other political affiliations: United New Zealand (1995–2002); Future (1994–1995); Labour (until 1994)
- Spouse(s): Jennifer Mackrell (1976–present); 2 sons
- Relations: Frank Smyth (grandfather)

Peter Francis Dunne CNZM (born 17 March 1954) is a New Zealand retired politician.

Dunne was the Member of Parliament (MP) for the Ōhāriu electorate and its predecessors from 1984 to 2017, first as a member of the Labour Party from 1984 to 1994 before joining or leading a succession of minor centrist parties. He was the Leader of Future New Zealand from 1994 to 1995, United New Zealand from 1996 to 2000, and United Future from 2000 to 2017. He was four times appointed a minister in governments led by both the National and Labour governments in 1990, 1996, 2005 to 2013 and 2014 to 2017 and held the offices of Minister of Regional Development, Minister of Revenue and Minister of Internal Affairs.

Except for two terms (2002 to 2008), Dunne was the sole member of his party from the 1996 general election until his retirement at the 2017 general election. While the party continued to contest the election without him, it attained only 0.1% of the party vote and no seats in Parliament. In his retirement Dunne has appeared as a political commentator.

== Early life and family ==
Dunne was born in Christchurch on 17 March 1954, the son of Ralph Esmond Dunne and Joan Claver Dunne. He attended St Bede's College and gained an MA in political science from Canterbury University before studying business administration at Massey University.

In 1976, he married high school chemistry teacher Jennifer Mackrell, and they have two sons. His brother, John Dunne, is a radio broadcaster. A grandfather, Frank Smyth, played for the All Blacks. He worked for the Department of Trade and Industry from 1977 to 1978 and then for the Alcoholic Liquor Advisory Council until 1984. He served as deputy chief executive of the council from 1980 to 1984.

== Member of Parliament ==
=== Labour MP ===
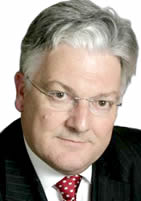
Peter Dunne

In the 1984 election, Dunne was the Labour Party's 30-year old candidate in Ohariu, held by the National Party's Hugh Templeton, who was the trade and industry minister and a former revenue minister. Bob Jones, leader of the New Zealand Party also contested the seat, creating a three-way competition that enabled a Labour victory. Ohariu at that time was a young electorate, with two-thirds of residents aged under 35. In his maiden statement, delivered on 23 August 1984, Dunne spoke about the economic policy of the previous government which had led to high unemployment that was felt particularly by young people. He said: "My generation has seen all the advantages that our parents fought to obtain for us whittled away, and we now see the next generation coming forward as one of the least privileged in our history. We are angry at the "do nothing" leadership that has allowed that to happen... Accordingly, it is little wonder that I find my spiritual home in the Labour Party as the embodiment of the commitment to positive change."

Dunne retained his seat in the 1987 election, after which he became a Parliamentary Undersecretary. In 1990, he became Minister of Regional Development, Associate Minister for the Environment, and Associate Minister of Justice. As Minister of Regional Development he established a nationwide network of Business Development Boards to promoter regional business development initiatives, As Associate Minister for the Environment he developed a National Waste Management strategy which included the introduction of kerbside recycling schemes.

He won his seat again in the 1990 election, but the Labour Party suffered defeat, and Dunne thus lost his ministerial posts. In November 1990 he was appointed as Labour's spokesperson for revenue, regional development and the environment by Labour leader Mike Moore.

In the 1993 election, Dunne won the seat of Onslow, which covered much the same area as his former Ohariu seat. He found himself, however, increasingly at odds with the majority of the Labour Party. Dunne tended to support Labour's right-leaning faction rather than the party's more unionist wing. With the departure of leading right-wingers like Roger Douglas, Richard Prebble and David Caygill he found himself isolated. In October 1994 Dunne resigned from the Labour Party, becoming an independent MP. Soon after he rebuffed an approach by National MP Christine Fletcher to join the National Party. A short time later, he established the Future New Zealand party (not to be confused with a later party of the same name).

=== United New Zealand party ===
New Zealand Parliament
Years	Term	Electorate	List	Party
1984–1987	41st	Ohariu		Labour
1987–1990	42nd	Ohariu		Labour
1990–1993	43rd	Ohariu		Labour
1993–1994	44th	Onslow		Labour
1994	Changed allegiance to:			Independent
1994–1995	Changed allegiance to:			Future
1995–1996	Changed allegiance to:			United NZ
1996–1999	45th	Ohariu-Belmont	3	United NZ
1999–2000	46th	Ohariu-Belmont	1	United NZ
2000–2002	Changed allegiance to:			United Future
2002–2005	47th	Ohariu-Belmont	1	United Future
2005–2008	48th	Ohariu-Belmont	1	United Future
2008–2011	49th	Ōhariu	1	United Future
2011–2013	50th	Ōhariu	1	United Future
2013	Changed allegiance to:			Independent
2013–2014	Changed allegiance to:			United Future
2014–2017	51st	Ōhāriu	1	United Future

In 1995, a group of MPs from both Labour and National decided to band together and form a new centrist party. Dunne, who had already quit his party in a similar way, decided to join the larger group. Together, the defectors and Dunne established the United New Zealand party, with a total of seven MPs, led by Clive Matthewson. United eventually established a coalition with the National Party, with the deal seeing Dunne return to Cabinet as Minister of Internal Affairs and Revenue.

United New Zealand hoped to take advantage of the new mixed-member proportional (MMP) system, which took effect for the 1996 election. However, that election saw United New Zealand almost completely wiped out. Dunne, by virtue of his personal support, won the newly formed seat of Ohariu-Belmont, but all other United MPs suffered defeat. As the sole surviving United member in the House, Dunne became the party's leader. Towards the end of the parliamentary term, Dunne became part of a varied assortment of minor parties and independents who kept the National Party government in office after its coalition with New Zealand First collapsed in August 1998. Dunne retained his seat in the 1999 election. In this contest, the National Party put up no candidate in his electorate.

=== United Future New Zealand party ===
In 2000, Dunne's United merged with the Future New Zealand party (not to be confused with Dunne's own earlier party of the same name). Dunne remained leader of the new group, called United Future New Zealand. In the 2002 election, Dunne retained his seat despite challenges from both major parties. Mostly as a result of a strong performance by Dunne in a televised political debate, United Future surged unexpectedly in support, winning 6.69% of the nationwide party vote. In Parliament, United Future came to an agreement to support the governing Labour Party, although the two parties did not enter into a formal coalition arrangement. Dunne remained United Future's leader.

A condition of United Future's agreement with Labour was the established of the Families Commission to advocate for the interests of families when legislation was being developed and to sponsor and undertake into issues relating to families. The Commission was established in 2004, and was subsequently integrated into the Ministry of Social Development in 2016.

=== United Future New Zealand working with Outdoor Recreation ===
United Future, like other minor political parties working in coalition, suffered in the polls. The United Future entered an agreement to work formally with the Outdoor Recreation Party, a registered political party formed to represent the views of hunters, fishers, trampers and recreational users of the marine and natural environment.

Dunne retained his seat in the 2005 general election but his party's proportion of the nationwide vote diminished considerably, with a corresponding loss of seats in Parliament.

=== Fifth Labour Government ===
On 17 October 2005 Dunne gave his support to a Labour-led Government, along with Winston Peters' New Zealand First Party and Jim Anderton's Progressive Party. Dunne's decision to support a Labour-led Government disappointed some. During the election campaign Dunne and National Party leader Don Brash publicly sat outside an Epsom café over a cup of tea as a demonstration to the electorate that Dunne could co-operate with National. This demonstration saw the majority of National supporters in Ohariu-Belmont combine with United Future and other Dunne supporters to return Dunne with a comfortable majority. National won the party vote in his seat by 3.57% over Labour. Dunne's party received 5.55%, while the Green Party, which Dunne had criticised heavily in the campaign, received 5.84%.

Don Brash expressed a lack of amusement with Dunne's decision to support a Labour-led coalition government. Brash expressed astonishment at Dunne accepting the ministerial portfolio of Revenue while remaining outside Cabinet. Asked if he considered Dunne guilty of dirty dealing, Brash said he would not use those words. Representatives of business, however, welcomed the appointment.

As Minister of Revenue he led a review of New Zealand's business tax regime, which led to major changes being announced in the 2007 Budget. In his role of Associate Minister of Health he introduced a national medicines strategy, Medicines New Zealand, to guide the availability and funding of medicines to New Zealanders.

After the 2005 New Zealand general election, United Future retained only two list Members of Parliament, Judy Turner and Gordon Copeland. Copeland left the party in May 2007 to re-form the Future New Zealand Party, after opposing Dunne over Sue Bradford's private members bill against parental corporal punishment of children. After Copeland's departure, Judy Turner remained the only United Future List MP in Parliament. Dunne supported Bradford's Child Discipline Act.

=== Fifth National Government ===
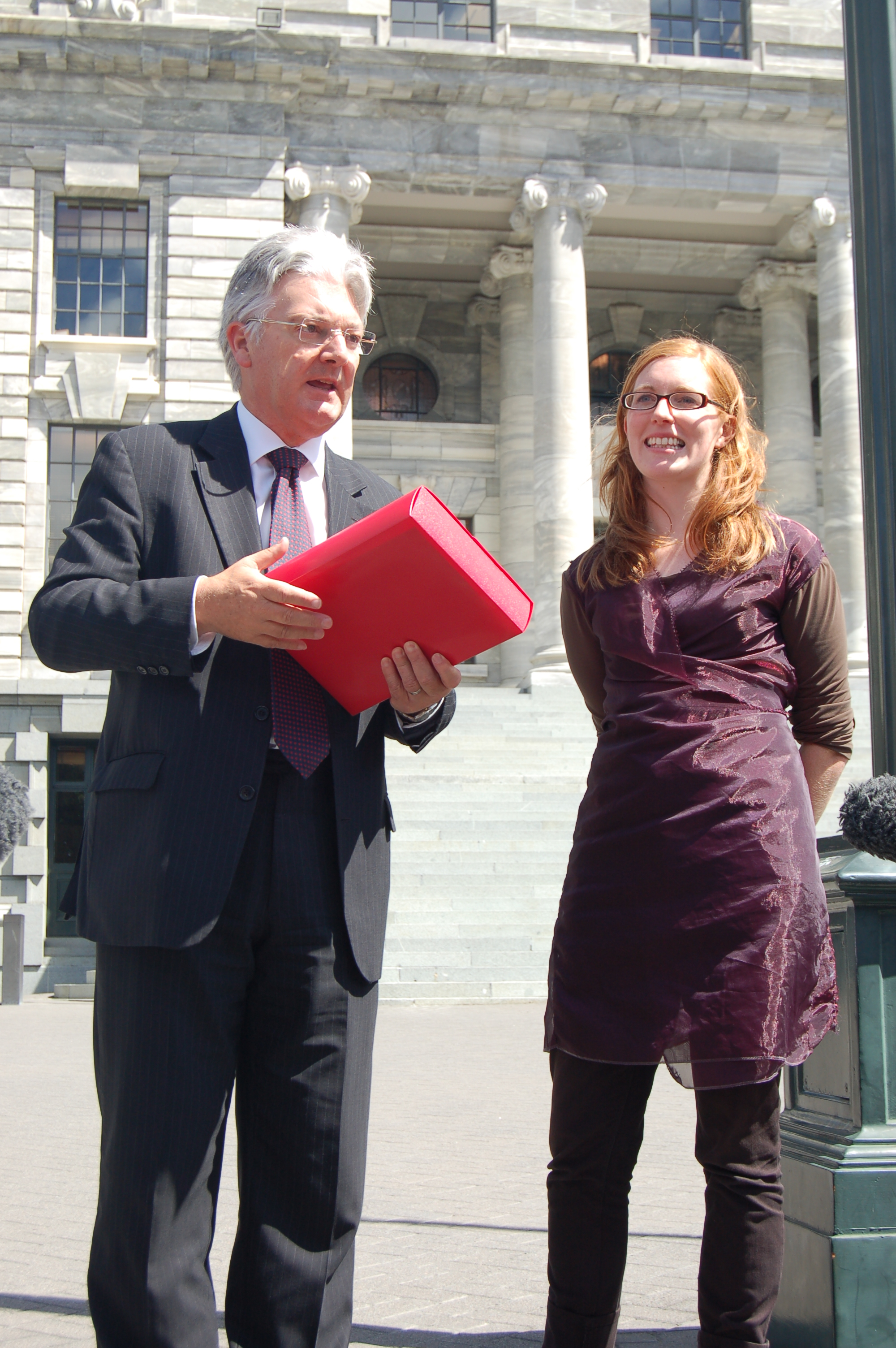
Dunne receiving the New Zealand Internet Blackout petition in 2009

United Future's share of the party vote declined further in the 2008 election, to less than one percent. However, Dunne retained his electorate seat. The National Party won most seats overall and formed a minority government with support from Dunne, the Māori Party and Act New Zealand. Dunne retained his positions of Minister of Revenue and Associate Minister of Health. However, like ministers from the other support parties, he remained outside Cabinet.

Between December 2008 and August 2009, Dunne served as the chairman of the Emissions Trading Scheme Review Committee. Dunne described the committee's report, which consisted of four minority reports, as a "middle road" through "complex and contentious" material.

In 2010, as Minister of Revenue, Dunne introduced the Taxation (Income-sharing Tax Credit) Bill to Parliament in September 2010, to give effect to United Future's policy of allowing couples raising dependent children up to the age of 18 years to share their incomes for tax purposes. The Bill was referred to a select committee and was reported back to Parliament in March 2011, but never had a second reading. He also made major changes to the Child Support Scheme and to the tax rules for charitable donations, including removing the $1800 maximum rebate that could be claimed, and abolishing Gift Duty. In April 2011, the government announced the establishment of a statutory Game Animal Council, another United Future initiative agreed to as part of the 2008 confidence and supply agreement. As Associate Minister of Conservation he subsequently oversaw the legislation establishing the Game Animal Council.

Dunne has long argued for reform of the superannuation system, proposing a flexible system, known as Flexi Super, where people could retire earlier and receive less, or later and receive more.

During the fifth National government's second term (2011–14), Dunne was reappointed Minister of Revenue and Associate Minister of Health, and gained an additional appointment as Associate Minister of Conservation. With the Government majority reduced, Dunne held the balance of power for more than ten pieces of legislation in that term, including the Government's asset-sales plan.

As Associate Minister of Health, Dunne had responsibility for drugs, mental health and suicide prevention. He was responsible for the Psychoactive Substances Act 2013, which established a regulated market for psychoactive substances, and New Zealand's National Drug Policy released in 2015. In 2015–17 he made moves to make cannabis-based medicines more available to New Zealanders.

As Minister of Internal Affairs between 2014 and 2017 Dunne extended the term of the New Zealand passport from 5 years to 10 years and initiated the development of an integrated national fire and emergency service, Fire and Emergency New Zealand, to replace the New Zealand Fire Service and the separate Rural Fire Service. He also oversaw the He Tohu project which saw three of New Zealand's most precious constitutional documents – the 1835 Declaration of Independence, the 1840 Treaty of Waitangi, and the 1893 Women's Suffrage petition – rehoused in a purpose-built facility at the National Library.

==== Resignation and reinstatement ====
In mid-2013 Dunne refused to hand over all 86 emails between himself and Fairfax journalist Andrea Vance relating to the inquiry into the leaking of Rebecca Kitteridge's GCSB report following its illegal spying on Kim Dotcom. Prime Minister John Key told Dunne that if he would not co-operate with the inquiry he would have to resign his ministerial positions – which he did on 7 June. However, in December 2013 Parliament's powerful Privileges Committee found that Dunne was entirely within his rights to decline the Henry Inquiry access to his emails. It further described the actions of the Henry Inquiry as "unacceptable", "mystifying" and "unprecedented". The committee found "failure at many levels", particularly as to why the Speaker of the House was not consulted, or at least informed, about the requests and information releases. In December 2014 the Chief Ombudsman ruled that the emails did not contain official information and were therefore not required to be released.

On 28 January 2014, Dunne was reinstated to the Executive as Minister of Internal Affairs, Associate Minister of Health, and Associate Minister of Conservation. He retained his portfolios on 29 September 2014, after the 2014 general election, in the third term of the National Party-led government.

==== Party registration status ====
On 31 May 2013 the New Zealand Electoral Commission de-registered the United Future Party at their request, following concerns the party no longer had the requisite 500 members. This meant Dunne was no longer the leader of a political party and was denied more than $180,000 in funding he had previously been allocated as a party leader. The Electoral Commission re-registered United Future as a political party on 13 August 2013. The Speaker of the House, David Carter, restored Dunne's position as leader of a recognised Parliamentary party and re-allocated party funding in late August 2013.

== Honours and awards ==
In 1990, Dunne was awarded the New Zealand 1990 Commemoration Medal. In the 2018 New Year Honours, he was appointed a Companion of the New Zealand Order of Merit, for services as a member of Parliament.

== Political philosophy ==
Dunne supported homosexual law reform when it became an issue in the mid-1980s. He has consistently favoured more liberal drinking laws. In a 2008 interview, Dunne suggested it may be time to review New Zealand's abortion laws and leave the decision to a woman and her doctor, based on informed consent.

From 2007, Dunne rebranded United Future as a centrist party, based on promoting strong families and vibrant communities. Dunne has summarised his political views in two books, Home is Where My Heart Is (2002) and In the Centre of Things (2005).

Dunne supports a New Zealand republic, and holding an early referendum on the future of New Zealand's head of state has become part of United Future's policy programme. In 2004 he chaired the Constitutional Arrangements Committee. Dunne also supports the declaration of a 'New Zealand Day' (renaming Waitangi Day) and has sponsored a member's bill on the issue.

== Political publications ==
- Dunne, Peter (2002). Home is Where My Heart Is. Wellington, [N.Z.]: United Future New Zealand. ISBN 0-473-08433-3.
- Dunne, Peter (2005). In the Centre of Things. Wellington, [N.Z.]: Dunmore Press / United Future New Zealand. ISBN 1-877399-03-5.

New Zealand Parliament
Preceded by Hugh Templeton	Member of Parliament for Ohariu; 1984–1993	Vacant Constituency recreated (as Ōhariu) in 2008
Vacant Constituency recreated after abolition in 1963 Title last held by Henry May	Member of Parliament for Onslow; 1993–1996	Constituency abolished
New constituency	Member of Parliament for Ohariu-Belmont; 1996–2008	Constituency abolished
Vacant Constituency abolished (as Ohariu) in 1993	Member of Parliament for Ōhāriu; 2008–2017	Succeeded by Greg O'Connor
Party political offices
New political party	Leader of Future New Zealand; 1994–1995	Party merged into United New Zealand
Preceded by Clive Matthewson	Leader of United New Zealand; 1996–2000	Party merged with Future New Zealand into United Future New Zealand
New political party	Leader of United Future New Zealand; 2000–2017	Succeeded by Damian Light
Political offices
Preceded by Michael Cullen	Minister of Revenue; 2005–2013	Succeeded by Todd McClay
Preceded by Chris Tremain	Minister of Internal Affairs; 2014–2017	Succeeded by Tracey Martin
Honorary titles
Preceded by Jim Anderton	Father of the House; 2011–2017	Succeeded by Bill English
