= United New Zealand =

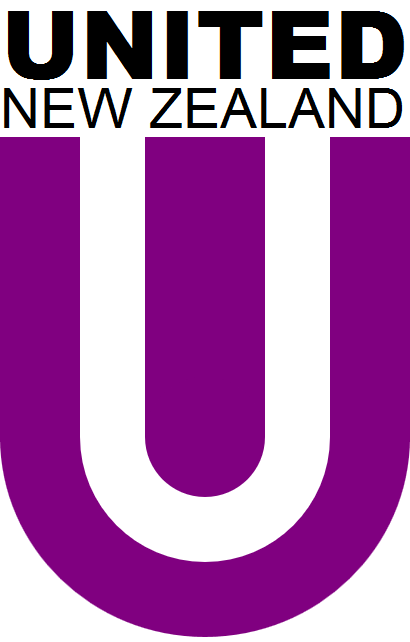
- Founder: Clive Matthewson
- Founded: 28 June 1995
- Dissolved: 2000; 25 years ago
- Split from: National Party; Labour Party
- Preceded by: Future NZ
- Succeeded by: United Future
- Ideology: Liberalism
- Political position: Centre
- International affiliation: None
- Colours: Purple

United New Zealand (Māori: Unaititi Aotearoa) was a centrist political party in New Zealand founded in 1995. It merged with the Christian-based Future New Zealand party to form the United Future New Zealand party in 2000.

== History ==
=== Formation ===
United was founded on 28 June 1995, one of a number of new parties hoping to capitalise on the upcoming switch to the MMP electoral system. It was intended to be a liberal centrist party, encompassing moderate voters from both the centre-left and the centre-right. The party was established by four MPs from the National Party, two MPs from the Labour Party, and former Labour MP Peter Dunne, who had already established his own party, Future New Zealand (not to be confused with the Christian-based party of the same name which United later merged with). The party was led by Clive Matthewson, a former Labour MP.

The MPs who established United were:

Name	Joined	Left	Prior affiliation
Margaret Austin	1995	1996	Labour
Bruce Cliffe	1995	1996	National
Peter Dunne	1995	2000	Future NZ
Clive Matthewson	1995	1996	Labour
Pauline Gardiner	1995	1996	National
Peter Hilt	1995	1996	National
John Robertson	1995	1996	National

=== 1996 election ===
The party, while initially attracting interest, performed poorly in the 1996 election. The party's policies were centrist and liberal in nature but to many appeared too bland to attract media profile. In addition, Matthewson, while charismatic, was seen by many as an intellectual light-weight. Bruce Cliffe had indicated he would resign from Parliament in 1996. Peter Dunne was the only United MP to retain his seat, with all others being ejected from Parliament. Clive Matthewson, whose seat had been abolished in the change to MMP, placed fourth in his new electorate.

As the party's only surviving MP, Peter Dunne became leader of United. When United entered into a coalition with the governing National Party in 1996, securing a Cabinet post for Peter Dunne, many commentators claimed that the party had abandoned its centrist stance. United claimed that a deal with National would allow United to moderate National's more extreme right-wing tendencies and that such arrangements would become common practice under the new MMP system.

1997 saw the merging into United of the Advance NZ Party, Ethnic Minority Party and the Conservatives; all small centre-right parties established to contest the 1996 election.

=== 1999 election ===
In the 1999 election, United's share of the vote declined even further, with swinging voters shifting to Labour to oust the Shipley government. However, Peter Dunne managed to retain his electorate seat thereby preserving United's parliamentary representation.

=== Later developments ===
United merged with a social conservative, evangelical Christian-based party Future New Zealand (not to be confused with Peter Dunne's party before United was formed) in 2000. Future New Zealand, formerly the Christian Democrats, was not represented in parliament. The merged party adopted the name United Future New Zealand, and established a caucus that has extended from seven (47th New Zealand Parliament, 2002–2005) to three (48th New Zealand Parliament, 2005–2007) to two members (48th New Zealand Parliament, May 2007 – 2008) with the departure of Gordon Copeland, eventually returning to just one MP elected in 2008, 2011 and 2014. Of these caucuses, Dunne remained the only electorate MP, while his caucus was formed from United Future's MMP party list, and consisted of MPs who were progressive on social justice issues but conservative on some moral issues.

== Electoral results ==
Election	seats won	party votes	popular vote
1996	1 / 120	18,245	0.88%
1999	1 / 120	11,065	0.54%
