= New Zealand Republican Party (1995) =

Defunct political party in New Zealand

The New Zealand Republican Party of 1995 was a political party which campaigned for the creation of a New Zealand republic as one of its main policies. It existed from 1995 to 2002. The party's policies included adopting a republican form of government, with an elected president and a restored upper house. The party was not supported by the Republican Movement of Aotearoa New Zealand.

== Founding ==
The party was registered as an incorporated society on 24 January 1995 as "The Confederation of United Tribes of New Zealand Incorporated" but changed its name on 8 February 1995 to the New Zealand Republican Party. It was led by William Powell.

The party registered with the Electoral Commission on 20 May 1995.

== 1996 election ==
Although the party was registered in time for the 1996 election, it was late in submitting its party list. The party challenged its exclusion as a result of failing to submit a list at the High Court of New Zealand, and attempted to have the 1996 elections postponed to allow this. Their application for an injunction was rejected however.

== 1999 election ==
In the 1999 election, the party submitted a list, but won only 0.01% (292 votes in total) of the vote, the lowest of all registered parties. The party was officially de-registered on 24 June 2002, just before the 2002 election.

== See also ==
- Republicanism in New Zealand
